= Placebo discography =

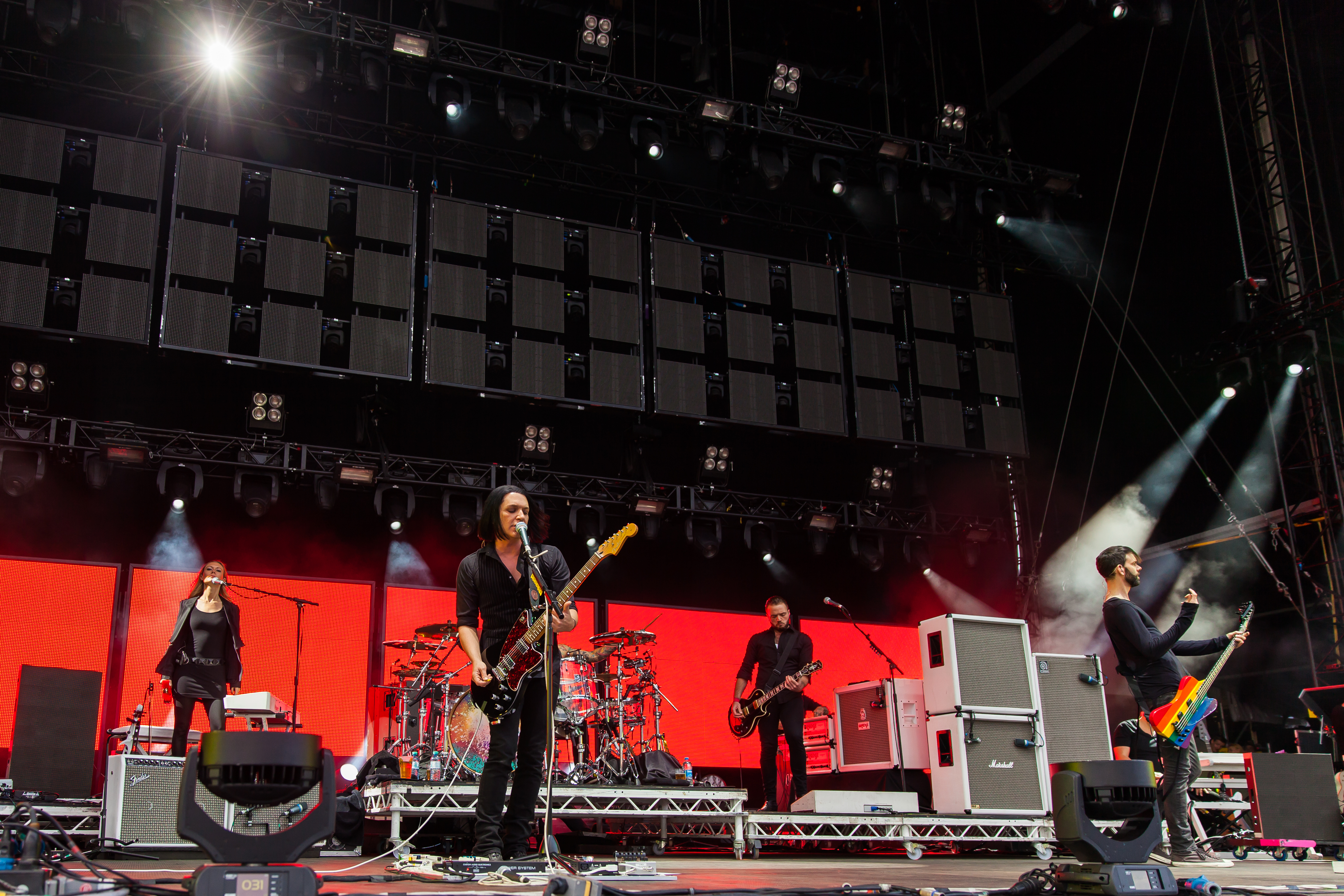
- Placebo in 2014
- Studio albums: 8
- Extended plays: 6
- Live albums: 3
- Compilation albums: 9
- Singles: 33

English alternative rock band Placebo have released eight studio albums, three compilation albums, six extended plays, and 33 singles. Their self-titled debut album was released in 1996 and peaked at number five on the UK Albums Chart. A single from the album, "Placebo", peaked at number four on the UK Singles Chart. Placebo's next studio album, 1998's Without You I'm Nothing, peaked at number seven in both the UK and France. The singles "Pure Morning" and "You Don't Care About Us" both reached the top five on the UK Singles Chart. Those were Placebo's last singles to make the top five in the UK.

In 2000, the band released Black Market Music. The album peaked at number one in France, number four in Germany, number six in the UK, and number seven in Austria. Placebo continued their chart success with the album Sleeping with Ghosts in 2003. It reached number one in France, number two in Germany, number three in Switzerland, number four in Portugal, and number six in Austria. It was also certified two times platinum in France. In 2004, they released a compilation album, Once More with Feeling: Singles 1996–2004, that peaked at number eight in the UK.

Placebo's fifth studio album, Meds, was released in 2006 and topped the charts in Austria, France, and Switzerland. Their sixth studio album, Battle for the Sun, was released in 2009 and topped the charts in Austria, France, Germany, and Switzerland; it was the band's fourth consecutive album to peak at number one in France. All of their first seven studio albums have reached the top twenty in the UK.

The band's eighth studio album, Never Let Me Go, was released on 25 March 2022. It was made available for pre-order on 9 November 2021.

== Albums ==
=== Studio albums ===
List of studio albums, with selected chart positions and certifications
Title	Album details	Peak chart positions										Certifications (sales thresholds)
Title	Album details	UK	AUS	AUT	BEL	FRA	GER	NL	NZ	SWI	US	Certifications (sales thresholds)
Placebo	Released: 17 June 1996; Label: Virgin; Formats: CD, cassette, vinyl	5	—	6	2	50	2	32	—	54	—	BPI: Platinum; SNEP: Platinum
Without You I'm Nothing	Released: 12 October 1998; Label: Virgin; Formats: CD, cassette, vinyl	7	14	43	—	7	55	65	15	95	— (Note: Without You I'm Nothing did not enter the US Billboard 200, but peaked at number 20 on the US Heatseekers Albums Chart.)	BPI: Platinum; ARIA: Platinum; SNEP: 2× Gold
Black Market Music	Released: 9 October 2000; Label: Virgin; Formats: CD, cassette, vinyl	6	18	7	3	1	4	28	22	15	— (Note: Black Market Music did not enter the US Billboard 200, but peaked at number 48 on the US Heatseekers Albums Chart.)	BPI: Gold; ARIA: Gold; BVMI: Gold; IFPI SWI: Gold
Sleeping with Ghosts	Released: 24 March 2003; Label: Astralwerks, EMD; Formats: CD, digital download, cassette, vinyl	11	11	6	1	1	2	19	37	3	— (Note: Sleeping with Ghosts did not enter the US Billboard 200, but peaked at number 18 on the US Heatseekers Albums Chart.)	BPI: Gold; BVMI: Platinum; IFPI AUT: Gold; IFPI SWI: Gold; SNEP: 2× Platinum
Meds	Released: 13 March 2006; Label: Virgin; Formats: CD, digital download, cassette, vinyl	7	4	1	1	1	2	10	24	1	180	BPI: Gold; BVMI: Platinum; IFPI AUT: Gold; IFPI SWI: Platinum; SNEP: Platinum
Battle for the Sun	Released: 8 June 2009; Label: PIAS, Vagrant; Formats: CD, vinyl, digital download	8	8	1	1	1	1	5	14	1	51	BPI: Gold; BVMI: Gold
Loud Like Love	Released: 16 September 2013; Label: Vertigo; Formats: CD, 12" vinyl, 10" vinyl, digital download	13	9	2	2	3	3	7	31	1	98	BVMI: Gold; IFPI AUT: Gold
Never Let Me Go	Released: 25 March 2022; Label: Elevator Lady, Rise; Formats: CD, LP, digital download, streaming	3	10	1	1	2	1	1	39	1	—	

=== Live albums ===
Title	Album details	Peak chart positions							Certifications (sales thresholds)
Title	Album details	AUT	BEL	FRA	GER	ITA	NL	SWI	Certifications (sales thresholds)
iTunes Live: London Festival '09	Released: 7 December 2009; Label: Dreambrother Ltd.; Formats: digital download	—	—	—	—	—	—	—	
MTV Unplugged	Released: 27 November 2015; Label: Universal; Formats: CD, vinyl, digital download, DVD, Blu-ray	21	20	59	6	33	43	13	BVMI: Gold
Collapse Into Never – Live in Europe 2023	Released: 15 December 2023; Label: Elevator Lady; Formats: CD, vinyl, digital download	—	—	—	—	—	—	—	

=== Compilation albums ===
Title	Album details	Peak chart positions										Certifications (sales thresholds)
Title	Album details	UK	AUS	AUT	BEL	FRA	GER	ITA	NL	NZ	SWI	Certifications (sales thresholds)
Covers	Released: 22 September 2003; Label: Virgin; Formats: CD, digital download, cassette, vinyl	—	—	—	—	—	—	99	—	—	—	
Once More with Feeling: Singles 1996–2004	Released: 25 October 2004; Label: Virgin, Astralwerks, EMD; Formats: CD, digital download, cassette, vinyl	8	30	8	1	—	14	8	66	33	4	BPI: Platinum; BVMI: Gold; SNEP: 2× Gold
B-Sides: 1996–2006	Released: 15 March 2011; Label: Virgin; Formats: CD, vinyl, digital download	—	—	—	—	—	—	—	—	—	—	
Placebo – B-Sides	Released: 31 July 2015; Label: Elevator Lady; Formats: Digital download	—	—	—	—	—	—	—	—	—	—	
Without You I'm Nothing – B-Sides	Released: 25 September 2015; Label: Elevator Lady; Formats: Digital download	—	—	—	—	—	—	—	—	—	—	
Black Market Music – B-Sides	Released: 27 November 2015; Label: Elevator Lady; Formats: Digital download	—	—	—	—	—	—	—	—	—	—	
Sleeping with Ghosts – B-Sides	Released: 19 February 2016; Label: Elevator Lady; Formats: Digital download	—	—	—	—	—	—	—	—	—	—	
Meds – B-Sides	Released: 8 April 2016; Label: Elevator Lady; Formats: Digital download	—	—	—	—	—	—	—	—	—	—	
A Place for Us to Dream	Released: 7 October 2016; Label: Rise Records; Formats: CD, vinyl, digital download	21	—	28	18	29	10	17	134	—	16	BPI: Gold

== Extended plays ==
Title	EP details	Peak chart positions					
Title	EP details	UK	BEL	FRA	GER	SCO	SWI
Live at La Cigale	Released: 2 October 2006; Label: Virgin; Formats: CD, digital download	—	—	—	—	—	—
Exclusive Session	Released: 29 January 2007; Label: Virgin; Formats: digital download	—	—	—	—	—	—
Extended Play '07	Released: 31 July 2007; Label: Virgin; Formats: CD	—	—	—	—	—	—
Live at Angkor Wat	Released: 12 December 2011; Label: Elevator Lady; Formats: digital download	—	—	—	—	—	—
B3	Released: 15 October 2012; Label: Vertigo; Formats: CD, vinyl, digital download	65	—	66	39	81	25
Life's What You Make It	Released: 7 October 2016; Label: Elevator Lady; Formats: vinyl, digital download	—	66	—	—	—	—

== Singles ==
List of singles, with selected chart positions, showing year released and album name
Title	Year	Peak chart positions										Certifications	Album
Title	Year	UK	AUS	AUT	BEL	FRA	GER	ITA	SPA	SWI	US Bub.	Certifications	Album
"Bruise Pristine"	1995	—	—	—	—	—	—	—	—	—	—		Placebo
"Come Home"	1996	86	—	—	—	—	—	—	—	—	—		Placebo
"36 Degrees"	1996	80	—	—	—	—	—	—	—	—	—		Placebo
"Teenage Angst"	1996	30	—	—	—	—	—	—	—	—	—		Placebo
"Nancy Boy"	1997	4	158	—	—	—	—	—	—	—	—	BPI: Silver	Placebo
"Bruise Pristine" (reissue)	1997	14	—	—	—	—	—	—	—	—	—		Placebo
"Pure Morning"	1998	4	49	—	—	—	—	—	—	—	—	BPI: Silver	Without You I'm Nothing
"You Don't Care About Us"	1998	5	103	—	—	—	—	—	—	—	—		Without You I'm Nothing
"Every You Every Me"	1999	11	46	—	—	—	99	—	—	—	—	BPI: Gold	Without You I'm Nothing
"Without You I'm Nothing"	1999	—	52	—	—	79	—	—	—	—	—		Without You I'm Nothing
"Burger Queen Français"	1999	—	—	—	—	78	—	—	—	—	—		Without You I'm Nothing
"Taste in Men"	2000	16	69	—	— (Note: "Taste in Men" did not enter the Wallonie Ultratop 50, but peaked at eight on the Wallonie Ultratip chart.)	54	—	11	—	—	—		Black Market Music
"Slave to the Wage"	2000	19	110	—	— (Note: "Slave to the Wage" did not enter the Wallonie Ultratop 50, but peaked at 17 on the Wallonie Ultratip chart.)	63	92	—	—	—	—		Black Market Music
"Special K"	2001	—	50	—	— (Note: "Special K" did not enter the Wallonie Ultratop 50, but peaked at five on the Wallonie Ultratip chart.)	60	—	18	—	—	—		Black Market Music
"Black-Eyed"	2001	—	—	—	—	—	94	—	—	—	—		Black Market Music
"The Bitter End"	2003	12	47	—	39	31	34	16	19	53	—	BPI: Silver	Sleeping with Ghosts
"This Picture"	2003	23	52	—	— (Note: "This Picture" did not enter the Wallonie Ultratop 50, but peaked at 16 on the Wallonie Ultratip chart.)	63	75	—	20	—	—		Sleeping with Ghosts
"Special Needs"	2003	27	—	—	— (Note: "Special Needs" did not enter the Wallonie Ultratop 50, but peaked at seven on the Wallonie Ultratip chart.)	67	71	—	—	—	—		Sleeping with Ghosts
"English Summer Rain"	2004	23	—	—	— (Note: "English Summer Rain" did not enter the Wallonie Ultratop 50, but peaked at 11 on the Wallonie Ultratip chart.)	—	—	—	17	98	—		Sleeping with Ghosts
"Twenty Years"	2004	18	—	59	17	54	52	20	4	50	—		Once More with Feeling
"Protège-moi"	2004	—	—	—	17	18	—	—	—	26	—		Once More with Feeling
"Because I Want You"	2006	13	—	—	—	—	—	—	—	—	—		Meds
"Song to Say Goodbye"	2006	—	30	44	18	41	35	5	7	38	—		Meds
"Infra-Red"	2006	42	52	—	— (Note: "Infra-Red" did not enter the Wallonie Ultratop 50, but peaked at seven on the Wallonie Ultratip chart.)	—	75	—	—	—	—		Meds
"Meds" (featuring Alison Mosshart)	2006	35	—	—	— (Note: "Meds" did not enter the Wallonie Ultratop 50, but peaked at 14 on the Wallonie Ultratip chart.)	—	83	—	—	78	—		Meds
"Running Up That Hill"	2007	44	81	—	—	—	—	—	—	—	16	BPI: Gold	Covers
"For What It's Worth"	2009	97	88	24	24	25	32	46	—	33	—		Battle for the Sun
"The Never-Ending Why"	2009	— (Note: "The Never-Ending Why" did not enter the UK Singles Chart, but peaked at number 23 on the UK Physical Singles Chart.)	—	—	—	—	—	—	—	—	—		Battle for the Sun
"Ashtray Heart"	2009	—	—	—	—	44	66	—	—	—	—		Battle for the Sun
"Bright Lights"	2010	—	—	—	—	92	62	—	—	—	—		Battle for the Sun
"B3"	2012	—	—	35	—	53	—	—	—	—	—		B3
"Too Many Friends"	2013	—	—	51	26	31	14	—	—	54	—		Loud Like Love
"Loud Like Love"	2014	—	—	—	— (Note: "Loud Like Love" did not enter the Wallonie Ultratop 50, but peaked at 35 on the Wallonie Ultratip chart.)	151	—	—	—	—	—		Loud Like Love
"A Million Little Pieces"	2014	—	—	—	— (Note: "A Million Little Pieces" did not enter the Wallonie Ultratop 50, but peaked at 43 on the Wallonie Ultratip chart.)	—	—	—	—	—	—		Loud Like Love
"Jesus' Son"	2016	—	—	—	— (Note: "Jesus' Son" did not enter the Wallonie Ultratop 50, but charted as an "extra tip" on the Wallonie Ultratip chart.)	—	—	—	—	—	—		A Place for Us to Dream
"Beautiful James"	2021	— (Note: "Beautiful James" did not enter the UK Singles Chart, but peaked at number 38 on the UK Single Sales Chart.)	—	—	—	—	—	—	—	—	—		Never Let Me Go
"Surrounded by Spies"	2021	—	—	—	—	—	—	—	—	—	—		Never Let Me Go
"Try Better Next Time"	2022	—	—	—	—	—	—	—	—	—	—		Never Let Me Go
"Happy Birthday in the Sky"	2022	—	—	—	—	—	—	—	—	—	—		Never Let Me Go
"Shout"	2022	— (Note: "Shout" did not enter the UK Singles Chart, but peaked at number 41 on the UK Single Sales Chart.)	—	—	—	—	—	—	—	—	—		Non-album singles
"Helen Keller"	2026	— (Note: "Helen Keller" did not enter the UK Singles Chart, but peaked at number 78 on the UK Single Sales Chart.)	—	—	—	—	—	—	—	—	—		Non-album singles
"—" denotes a recording that did not chart or was not released in that territory.

== DVDs ==
Release date	Title	Director	Formats
6 April 2004	Soulmates Never Die (Live in Paris 2003)	Russell Thomas	DVD
30 November 2004	Once More with Feeling: Videos 1996–2004	Matthew Amos, Simon Cracknell, Howard Greenhalgh and others	DVD
13 March 2006	Meds (Special Edition Bonus DVD)		DVD
31 October 2011	We Come in Pieces		DVD, Blu-ray
27 November 2015	MTV Unplugged		DVD, Blu-ray
3 October 2025	This Search for Meaning		DVD, Blu-ray
