= Soulmates Never Die (Live in Paris 2003) =

Video by Placebo
- Released: 15 March 2004
- Recorded: 18 October 2003
- Genre: Alternative rock
- Label: Hut
- Producer: Done and Dusted

Placebo chronology
Covers (2003)	Soulmates Never Die (Live in Paris 2003) (2004)	Once More with Feeling: Videos 1996–2004 (2004)

Soulmates Never Die (Live in Paris 2003) is a live DVD by English alternative rock band Placebo, recorded on 18 October 2003 at the Palais Omnisports de Paris-Bercy in Paris. It is the first DVD by Placebo that was released mainstream and made available worldwide. The DVD was released in the UK on 15 March 2004 and in the US and Canada on 29 June 2004.

== Reception ==
Tim DiGravina of AllMusic wrote that "the film is an intensely edgy portrait of Placebo as a trio of arena rock gods [...] [Brian Molko's] voice is still in fine form, his and Stefan Olsdal's guitars are as fierce and crunchy as ever, and Steve Hewitt's drumming is spot-on. Every one of the 21 songs is tackled with conviction and passion. Indeed, most of the songs sound fuller and better here than on their respective albums."

== Track listing ==
1. "Bulletproof Cupid"
2. "Allergic (To Thoughts of Mother Earth)"
3. "Every You Every Me"
4. "Bionic"
5. "Protège-Moi" (French version of "Protect Me From What I Want")
6. "Plasticine"
7. "The Bitter End"
8. "Soulmates" (Heavier version of "Sleeping with Ghosts")
9. "Black-Eyed"
10. "I'll Be Yours"
11. "Special Needs"
12. "English Summer Rain"
13. "Without You I'm Nothing"
14. "This Picture"
15. "Special K"
16. "Taste in Men"
17. "Slave to the Wage"
18. "Peeping Tom"
19. "Pure Morning"
20. "Centerfolds"
21. "Where Is My Mind?" (Pixies cover featuring Frank Black)

== Features ==
- Sleeping with Ghosts documentary: A 25-minute tour documentary of the band as they tour the world to promote their album. Includes backstage footage, parties and the band just hanging out.
- Chicks with Dicks: Hidden in the "Audio" section of the DVD is an old live performance of "Where Is My Mind?", a Pixies cover, while the band is dressed-up in drag. To view this, one is to go to the 'Audio' section, highlight 'Stereo' and push the 'up' key, after which a French flag should appear. After pressing 'OK' the feature should begin playing.
- Brian's B12's On Tour: This is a humorous scene in which the cameras are focused on Brian. To view this, one is to go to the DVD 'main menu', highlight 'set list' and press the 'up' key, after which a French flag should appear. After pressing 'OK' the feature should begin playing.

== Personnel ==
- Brian Molko – guitars, vocals, bass, keyboards, effects, harmonica, percussion
- Stefan Olsdal – bass, guitars, keyboards, backing vocals
- Steve Hewitt – drums, percussion
- Bill Lloyd – bass, guitars, keyboards
- Xavior Roide – keyboards, percussion, backing vocals

== Certifications ==
Region	Certification	Certified units/sales
Austria (IFPI Austria) video	Gold	5,000^{*}
France (SNEP) video	Diamond	100,000^{*}
Germany (BVMI) video	Gold	25,000^{^}
Mexico (AMPROFON) video	Gold	10,000^{^}
^{*} Sales figures based on certification alone.^{^} Shipments figures based on certification alone.
