= Once More with Feeling: Singles 1996–2004 =

Greatest hits album by Placebo

Greatest hits album by Placebo
- Released: 30 November 2004
- Recorded: 1994–2004
- Genre: Alternative rock
- Length: 67:23
- Label: Astralwerks, Hut
- Producer: Placebo; Jim Abbiss; Dare Mason; Steve Osborne; Phil Vinall; Brad Wood

Placebo chronology
Covers (2003)	Once More with Feeling: Singles 1996–2004 (2004)	Meds (2006)

Singles from Once More with Feeling
- 1. "Protège-Moi" Released: 8 April 2004; 2. "Twenty Years" Released: 18 October 2004

Professional ratings
Review scores
Source	Rating
AllMusic	4/5 stars
BBC Music	favourable
Kludge	5/10
musicOMH	favourable
PopMatters	favourable
Stylus Magazine	A−

Once More with Feeling: Singles 1996–2004 is a greatest hits album by British alternative rock band Placebo. It was released on 30 November 2004 by record label Hut to celebrate the band's tenth anniversary. It features their singles from 1996 to 2004 (the only omission being the band's debut single, "Come Home") as well as three new songs: "I Do", "Twenty Years", and "Protège-Moi", the last two of which were released as singles. The album is also available in DVD format, titled Once More with Feeling: Videos 1996–2004, featuring all of the band's music videos.

== Release history ==
The limited edition of the album included a bonus remix disc featuring remixes by artists such as Timo Maas, UNKLE, and M83. There is also a limited edition bonus disc exclusive to the Mexican market which features remixes by Mexican artists.

This album has been released with the Copy Control protection system in some regions.

== Track listing ==
All tracks are written by Placebo, except where noted.

No.	Title	Writer(s)	Length
1.	"36 Degrees"	Paul Campion; Brian Molko; Stefan Olsdal; Robert Schultzberg	3:07
2.	"Teenage Angst"	Campion; Molko; Olsdal; Schultzberg	2:40
3.	"Nancy Boy" (radio edit)	Campion; Molko; Olsdal; Schultzberg	3:19
4.	"Bruise Pristine"	Campion; Molko; Olsdal; Schultzberg	3:36
5.	"Pure Morning" (radio edit)		3:59
6.	"You Don't Care About Us"		4:01
7.	"Every You Every Me" (single mix)	Campion; Placebo	3:34
8.	"Without You I'm Nothing" (single mix feat. David Bowie)		4:14
9.	"Taste in Men" (radio edit)		3:59
10.	"Slave to the Wage" (radio edit)		3:46
11.	"Special K"		3:50
12.	"Black-Eyed"		3:44
13.	"The Bitter End"		3:11
14.	"This Picture"		3:35
15.	"Special Needs" (edit)		3:29
16.	"English Summer Rain" (single version)		3:10
17.	"Protège Moi"		3:14
18.	"I Do"		2:27
19.	"Twenty Years"	Campion; Placebo	4:19

Japanese bonus track
No.	Title	Length
20.	"Where Is My Mind? (XFM Live Version)"

Limited edition bonus remix CD
No.	Title	Length
1.	"Special K (Timo Maas Remix)"	7:30
2.	"Without You I'm Nothing (Unkle Remix)"	5:07
3.	"Every You Every Me (Infected by the Scourge of the Earth Mix)"	3:57
4.	"Protège-Moi (M83 Remix)"	3:19
5.	"Slave to the Wage (I Can't Believe It's a Remix)"	3:29
6.	"Pure Morning (Les Rythmes Digitales Remix)"	5:38
7.	"Taste in Men (Alpinestars Kamikaze Skimix)"	4:36
8.	"Black-Eyed (Placebo vs. Le Vibrator Mix)"	5:10
9.	"English Summer Rain (Freelance Hellraiser Remix)"	3:40
10.	"This Picture (Junior Sanchez Remix)"	5:55

== Once More with Feeling: Videos 1996–2004 ==
Once More with Feeling: Videos 1996–2004

Video by Placebo
- Released: 14 December 2004
- Genre: Alternative rock
- Length: 61:00

Placebo chronology
Soulmates Never Die (Live in Paris 2003) (2003)	Once More with Feeling: Videos 1996–2004 (2004)	Meds (Special Edition) (2006)

Once More with Feeling: Videos 1996–2004 was released in 2004 and features the band's music videos.

=== Track listing ===
Once More with Feeling: Videos 1996–2004
No.	Title	Length
1.	"36 Degrees" (directed by Chris Cunningham)
2.	"Teenage Angst" (directed by Trevor Robinson)
3.	"Nancy Boy" (directed by Howard Greenhalgh)
4.	"Bruise Pristine" (directed by Howard Greenhalgh)
5.	"Pure Morning" (directed by Nick Gordon)
6.	"You Don't Care About Us" (directed by John Hillcoat)
7.	"Every You Every Me" (directed by Matthew Amos)
8.	"Without You I'm Nothing (ft. David Bowie)"
9.	"Taste in Men" (directed by Barbara McDonough)
10.	"Slave to the Wage" (directed by Howard Greenhalgh)
11.	"Special K" (directed by Howard Greenhalgh)
12.	"Black-Eyed" (directed by Vanessa Jopp)
13.	"The Bitter End" (directed by Howard Greenhalgh)
14.	"This Picture" (directed by Howard Greenhalgh)
15.	"Special Needs" (directed by Paul Gore)
16.	"English Summer Rain" (directed by Grégoire Pinard)
17.	"Protège-moi (Live video)" (directed by Russel Thomas)

Bonus features
No.	Title	Length
1.	"Twenty Years" (video)	4:19
2.	"Care in the Community documentary"	37:00
3.	"Spite & Malice Placebo ft. Justin Warfield (Live at Reading Festival 2000)"	3:51
4.	"Twentieth Century Boy Placebo ft. David Bowie (Live at the Brit Awards 1999)"	3:50
5.	"Nancy Boy" (live show visual)	4:17
6.	"Peeping Tom" (live show visual)	5:54
7.	"Soulmates - Live in Paris DVD trailer"	1:57
8.	"English Summer Rain (Live Video)"	3:10

== Charts ==
=== Weekly charts ===
Chart (2004)	Peak position
Australian Albums (ARIA)	30
Austrian Albums (Ö3 Austria)	8
Belgian Albums (Ultratop Flanders)	5
Belgian Albums (Ultratop Wallonia)	1
Dutch Albums (Album Top 100)	66
German Albums (Offizielle Top 100)	14
Irish Albums (IRMA)	46
Italian Albums (FIMI)	8
New Zealand Albums (RMNZ)	33
Norwegian Albums (VG-lista)	30
Portuguese Albums (AFP)	12
Swiss Albums (Schweizer Hitparade)	4
UK Albums (Official Charts)	8

=== Year-end charts ===
Chart (2004)	Position
Belgian Albums (Ultratop Flanders)	55
Belgian Albums (Ultratop Wallonia)	11
Swiss Albums (Schweizer Hitparade)	93
UK Albums (OCC)	174

== Certifications ==
Region	Certification	Certified units/sales
France (SNEP)	2× Gold	200,000^{*}
Germany (BVMI)	Platinum	200,000^{^}
Mexico (AMPROFON)	Gold	50,000^{^}
United Kingdom (BPI)	Platinum	300,000^{‡}
Summaries
Europe (IFPI)	Platinum	1,000,000^{*}
^{*} Sales figures based on certification alone.^{^} Shipments figures based on certification alone.^{‡} Sales+streaming figures based on certification alone.

== Production credits ==
- Jim Abbiss – production (tracks 1-13–1-17), mixing (tracks 1-13–1-15)
- Philip Bagenal – engineering (tracks 1-18–1-19)
- Simon Barnicott – engineering (tracks 1-13–1-17), mixing (tracks 1-13–1-15)
- David Bascombe – mixing (tracks 1-3 and 1-8)
- Andy Bolleshon – additional production (track 2-1)
- James Brown – engineering assisting (track 1-16)
- Adrian Bushby – engineering (tracks 1-6–1-8)
- Martin Buttrich – additional production (track 2-1)
- Paul Corkett – engineering (track 1-9), additional engineering (track 1-6), mixing and production (tracks 1-9–1-12)
- Alex Cowper – sleeve art direction and design
- Jake Davies – engineering assisting (track 1-6)
- Lorraine Francis – engineering (tracks 1-9–1-12)
- Nick Hunt – engineering (track 1-19)
- Nadav Kander – sleeve photography
- Phelan Kane – programming (tracks 1-18–1-19)
- Ed Kenehan – engineering (tracks 1-1, 1-3–1-4)
- Timo Maas – additional production (track 2-1)
- Andy Mason – production (track 1-9)
- Sean Magee – mastering and remastering (tracks 1-1–1-19)
- Teo Miller – engineering (tracks 1-3–1-4), additional recording and mixing (track 1-7)
- Alan O'Connell – engineering assisting (tracks 1-18–1-19)
- Steve Osborne – production (tracks 1-6–1-8), mixing (track 1-6)
- Gareth Parton – engineering (track 1-18)
- Tom Paterson – engineering assisting (tracks 1-18–1-19)
- Kenny Patterson – engineering (track 1-9)
- Fergus Peterkin – engineering assisting (tracks 1-13–1-15)
- Dan Porter – engineering assisting (tracks 1-13–1-15)
- Junior Sanchez – additional production (track 2-10)
- Tom Stanley – engineering assisting (tracks 1-13–1-15)
- Dimitri Tikovoi – mixing (tracks 1-16–1-17)
- Jaquie Turner – engineering assisting (track 1-6)
- Orla Quirke – sleeve art direction
- Phil Vinall – production (tracks 1-3, 1-5, 1-18–1-19), mixing (tracks 1-5, 1-18–1-19)
- Tony Visconti – additional mixing and additional recording (track 1-8)
- Brad Wood – mixing and production (tracks 1-1–1-2, and 1-4)
