= We Come in Pieces =

Video by Placebo
- Released: 31 October 2011
- Recorded: 28 September 2010
- Genre: Alternative rock
- Label: Elevator Lady Ltd, Eagle Vision
- Director: Paul Shyvers
- Producer: JA Digital

Placebo chronology
Battle for the Sun (2009)	We Come in Pieces (2011)

Professional ratings
Review scores
Source	Rating
Record Collector	3/5 stars

We Come in Pieces is the second live DVD by the alternative rock band Placebo. It was announced on 24 August 2011 and released on 31 October 2011. It was recorded during a Placebo concert in Brixton Academy, London, on 28 September 2010, the final show of the Battle for the Sun Tour. The live performance includes 20 songs, 15 of which were exclusive to that DVD. The name of the album is a tribute to the Irish band of the same name.

The release has DVD, 2-disc deluxe, and Blu-ray editions. The deluxe and Blu-ray editions include a documentary film on the band's 2009–2010 tour.

== Track listing ==
Standard Edition

- Battle for Brixton
1. "Nancy Boy"
2. "Ashtray Heart"
3. "Battle for the Sun"
4. "Soulmates"
5. "Kitty Litter"
6. "Every You Every Me"
7. "Special Needs"
8. "Breathe Underwater"
9. "The Never-Ending Why"
10. "Bright Lights"
11. "Meds"
12. "Teenage Angst"
13. "All Apologies" (Nirvana cover)
14. "For What It's Worth"
15. "Song to Say Goodbye"
16. "The Bitter End"
17. "Trigger Happy Hands"
18. "Post Blue"
19. "Infra-Red"
20. "Taste in Men"

Bonus live tracks

1. "Kitty Litter"
2. "Speak in Tongue"
3. "For What It's Worth"
4. "Breath Underwater"
5. "Bright Lights"
6. "Trigger Happy Hands"

Deluxe/Blu-ray Edition bonus tracks

- Coming Up for Air
1. "Coming Up for Air" Documentary
2. "Trigger Happy Hands"

== Personnel ==
- Brian Molko – guitars, vocals
- Stefan Olsdal – bass, guitars, backing vocals
- Steve Forrest – drums, percussion, backing vocals
- Bill Lloyd – bass, keyboards
- Fiona Brice – violin, keyboards, theremin, percussion, backing vocals
- Nick Gavrilovic – guitars, keyboards, backing vocals
