= MTV Unplugged (Placebo album) =

Live album by Placebo
- Released: 27 November 2015
- Recorded: 19 August 2015
- Venue: The London Studios (Lambeth, South London, England)
- Genre: Acoustic rock
- Length: 75:00
- Label: Virgin EMI

Placebo chronology
Loud Like Love (2013)	MTV Unplugged (2015)	A Place for Us to Dream (2016)

Professional ratings
Review scores
Source	Rating
Drowned in Sound	favourable
Rolling Stone (Australia)	2.5/5 stars

MTV Unplugged is a live album by the English alternative rock band Placebo. It was released on 27 November 2015 by Virgin EMI Records, in the formats of CD, DVD, Blu-ray, double vinyl, limited edition double vinyl picture disc, digital download and limited edition super deluxe box set. Recorded on 19 August 2015 at The London Studios, it is part of the MTV Unplugged series.

Taking place during the band's 20th anniversary period, the performance featured a number of songs that were never played live before or not played live for several years, including "Bosco", "Jackie" and "Protect Me from What I Want". Among the instruments used on stage was a qanun purchased in Morocco.

During their MTV Unplugged concert, Placebo hosted two musical guests: Danish artist Broken Twin (Majke Voss Romme), with whom they performed "Every You Every Me", as well as the American Joan As Police Woman, who participated in a duet during "Protect Me from What I Want".

== Track listing ==
1. "Jackie" (Sinéad O'Connor cover) – 2:55
2. "For What It's Worth" – 3:09
3. "36 Degrees" – 4:18
4. "Because I Want You" – 4:34
5. "Every You Every Me" (featuring Majke Voss Romme a.k.a. Broken Twin) – 4:50
6. "Song to Say Goodbye" – 3:30
7. "Meds" – 4:55
8. "Protect Me from What I Want" (featuring Joan As Police Woman) – 4:18
9. "Loud Like Love" – 4:54
10. "Too Many Friends" – 5:45
11. "Post Blue" – 3:33
12. "Slave to the Wage" – 4:00
13. "Without You I'm Nothing" – 4:39
14. "Hold on to Me" – 3:52
15. "Bosco" – 7:04
16. "Where Is My Mind?" (Pixies cover) – 3:55
17. "The Bitter End" – 4:49
Total length: 75:00

== Personnel ==
- Brian Molko – vocals, guitar, harmonica
- Stefan Olsdal – bass, guitar, piano, qanun, shruti box, backing vocals
- Matt Lunn – drums, percussion
- Bill Lloyd – piano, bass, accordina
- Fiona Brice – violin, piano, glockenspiel, whirly tube, percussion, backing vocals
- Nick Gavrilovic – guitar, piano
