= Extended Play '07 =

EP by Placebo
- Released: 31 July 2007
- Genre: Alternative rock
- Length: 35:25
- Label: Virgin

Placebo chronology
Meds (2006)	Extended Play '07 (2007)	Battle for the Sun (2009)

Professional ratings
Review scores
Source	Rating
Allmusic	3/5 stars
PopMatters	5/10

Extended Play '07 is an EP by British alternative rock band Placebo, released on 31 July 2007 in the US only. It contains a popular single from every one of their albums as well as three live tracks. The EP was released mainly as a promotional item, targeting new fans created in the wake of the band's inclusion in Projekt Revolution 2007.

== Track listing ==
No.	Title	Length
1.	"Nancy Boy" (radio edit)	3:18
2.	"Every You Every Me" (single mix)	3:33
3.	"Taste in Men" (radio edit)	3:19
4.	"The Bitter End"	3:11
5.	"Meds" (featuring Alison Mosshart)	2:54
6.	"Pure Morning (Live from Arras)"	5:26
7.	"Infra-Red (Live from Nîmes)"	4:18
8.	"Running Up that Hill (Live from Santiago)"	8:46

== Personnel ==
Placebo

- Brian Molko – vocals, guitar
- Stefan Olsdal – guitar, bass, backing vocals
- Steve Hewitt – drums, percussion, backing vocals
