= Sleeping with Ghosts (song) =

Song by Placebo

from the album Sleeping with Ghosts
- Released: March 2003
- Genre: Alternative rock; electronic rock; dream pop
- Length: 4:38
- Label: Astralwerks/Emd
- Songwriter(s): Steve Forrest, William Patrick Lloyd, Brian Molko and Stefan Olsdal
- Producer(s): Jim Abbiss

"Sleeping with Ghosts" is the title cut from Placebo's fourth album, Sleeping with Ghosts. The song is a depiction of how, "Soulmates never die", or in more simple terms, how true friendships/relationships never end, linking it with the album's concept of relationships. The song's composition is softer compared to the other songs of the album, it features lighter, slower guitar and more piano than other titles. The chorus line, "Soulmates never die", was used as the title for the live DVD, Soulmates Never Die (Live in Paris 2003). The song was re-recorded as a B-side for the single "This Picture" and called simply "Soulmates". "Soulmates" is a slightly heavier attempt than the album version and is often played live. There is a piano version of the song on the bonus disc of the Battle for the Sun redux version.

When played live, Brian Molko often changes the lyrics from "damn the government, damn their killing, damn their lies" to "fuck the government, fuck their killing, fuck their lies" to add emphasis to his anger towards said parties.
