= Covers (Placebo album) =

Compilation album by Placebo
- Released: 22 September 2003
- Genre: Alternative rock
- Length: 40:38
- Labels: Hut; Astralwerks

Placebo chronology
Sleeping with Ghosts (2003)	Covers (2003)	Once More with Feeling (2004)

Singles from Covers
- 1. "Running Up that Hill" Released: 31 October 2006, 2007 (US)

2010 edition
- Cover of the 2010 issue, using the Sleeping with Ghosts-themed artwork.

Covers is a compilation album of covers by British alternative rock band Placebo. The album was originally released as a bonus disc with the special edition version of Sleeping with Ghosts on 22 September 2003 through Hut Records and Astralwerks, which has since gone out of print. "Running Up that Hill" is mostly responsible for this digital release package. After being used for the fourth-season premiere of The O.C., the song received much attention in both the US and the UK, peaking at No. 44 on the UK Singles Chart.

== Release ==
A vinyl LP version of the album was issued in 2003 with an all-gray cover and only the white name of the band on it (the 2010 LP reissue of the album has a red title). Most of the songs on the album were originally B-sides from the band's previous singles.

A repackaged physical version of the album was re-released on 3 May 2010 through Placebo's former label, EMI, with a new cover based on the Sleeping with Ghosts theme. However, this was strictly EMI's decision and didn't have any input from the band in releasing the album.

== Track listing ==
No.	Title	Writer(s)	Other appearances	Length
1.	"Running Up That Hill" (originally recorded by Kate Bush)	Kate Bush	recorded especially for the Covers disc released in 2003	4:57
2.	"Where Is My Mind?" (originally recorded by Pixies)	Black Francis	previously appeared on the "This Picture" single released in 2003, but it had an introduction by a radio presenter	3:44
3.	"Bigmouth Strikes Again" (originally recorded by The Smiths)	Johnny Marr/Steven Morrissey	previously appeared on the single to "Nancy Boy" released in 1997	3:54
4.	"Johnny and Mary" (originally recorded by Robert Palmer)	Robert Palmer	previously appeared on the "Taste in Men" single in 2000	3:25
5.	"20th Century Boy" (originally recorded by T. Rex)	Marc Bolan	previously released on the soundtrack to the film Velvet Goldmine and also as a B-side on the "You Don't Care About Us" single in 1998	4:39
6.	"The Ballad of Melody Nelson"" (originally recorded by Serge Gainsbourg)	Serge Gainsbourg/Jean-Claude Vannier	used on the Monsieur Gainsbourg Revisited compilation album released in 2005	3:58
7.	"Holocaust" (originally recorded by Big Star)	Alex Chilton	previously appeared on the "Slave to the Wage" single in 2000	4:27
8.	"I Feel You" (originally recorded by Depeche Mode)	Martin Gore	previously released on a fan club-only cassette in 1999 and as a bonus track on the American edition of Black Market Music	6:26
9.	"Daddy Cool" (originally recorded by Boney M.)	Frank Farian/George Reyam	previously appeared as a B-side on "The Bitter End" single in 2003	3:21
10.	"Jackie" (originally recorded by Sinéad O'Connor)	Sinéad O'Connor	previously appeared as a B-side on the DVD edition of the "This Picture" single in 2003	2:48
