= Live at Angkor Wat =

Live album by Placebo
- Released: 12 December 2011
- Genre: Alternative rock
- Label: Elevator Lady

Placebo chronology
Battle for the Sun (2009)	Live at Angkor Wat (2011)	B3EP (2012)

Live at Angkor Wat is a semi-acoustic live album by the alternative rock band Placebo, released on 12 December 2011. It was recorded at Angkor Wat in Cambodia on 7 December 2008, at the start of the Battle for the Sun tour. Placebo was the first rock band to play at the temple, which is a UNESCO World Heritage Site. The Angkor Wat concert had previously been released on DVD as part of the Battle for the Sun box set on 8 June 2009 and is currently only available separately in the iTunes Store, where it includes a ten-page PDF digital booklet.

== Track listing ==
No.	Title	Length
1.	"Because I Want You"	4:23
2.	"Follow the Cops Back Home"	4:52
3.	"Black-Eyed"	3:14
4.	"Meds"	5:23
5.	"Post Blue"	3:55
6.	"Blind"	4:15
7.	"Drag"	3:39
8.	"Teenage Angst"	3:19
9.	"Twenty Years"	4:55
