= Twenty Years (song) =

Single by Placebo

from the album Once More with Feeling: Singles 1996–2004
- Released: 18 October 2004
- Genre: Alternative rock
- Length: 4:19
- Label: Virgin
- Songwriters: Paul Campion; Steve Hewitt; Brian Molko; Stefan Olsdal
- Producer: Phil Vinall

Placebo singles chronology
| "Protège-Moi" (2004) | "Twenty Years" (2004) | "Because I Want You" (2006) |

"Twenty Years" is a song by English alternative rock band Placebo, included on their 2004 best-of compilation release Once More with Feeling: Singles 1996–2004. It was the only entirely new song to be released as a single (although "Protège-Moi", a French-language re-recording of an earlier song, was released in France).

== Release ==
In the UK, it peaked at number 18 in the UK Singles Chart. In Australia, the song was ranked at 95 on Triple J's Hottest 100 of 2004.

The song was one of two songs (along with "The Bitter End") performed by Placebo at the Paris leg of the international Live 8 benefit concert in 2005.

== Live performances ==
When played live, the song often had an extra middle eight section added on, complete with heavy experimental guitar. Since 2009, live shows feature an arrangement of the song that was first performed during the Live at Angkor Wat concert.

== Track listing ==
CD
| No. | Title | Length |
|---|---|---|
| 1. | "Twenty Years" | 4:19 |
| 2. | "Twenty Years (Fathom Remix)" | 3:45 |

7" vinyl
| No. | Title | Length |
|---|---|---|
| 1. | "Twenty Years" | 4:19 |
| 2. | "Detox Five" | 2:51 |

Enhanced CD
| No. | Title | Length |
|---|---|---|
| 1. | "Twenty Years" | 4:19 |
| 2. | "Detox Five" | 2:51 |
| 3. | "Twenty Years (Osymyso's Birthday mix)" | 6:04 |
| 4. | "Twenty Years (video)" | 3:21 |
