= English Summer Rain =

Single by Placebo

from the album Sleeping with Ghosts
- Released: 23 February 2004
- Genre: Alternative rock, electronic rock
- Length: 4:01 (album version); 3:10 (single version)
- Label: Virgin
- Songwriter(s): Steve Hewitt, William Patrick Lloyd, Brian Molko and Stefan Olsdal
- Producer(s): Jim Abbiss

Placebo singles chronology
"Special Needs" (2003)	"English Summer Rain" (2004)	"Protège-Moi" (2004)

"English Summer Rain" is the fourth single from Placebo's fourth studio album Sleeping with Ghosts, released in 2004.

In the UK, it peaked at number 23 in the UK Singles Chart. In Australia, the song was ranked number 53 on Triple J's Hottest 100 of 2004.

CMJ New Music Report said of the song that it "encapsulates seduction in its steady, determined melody".

== Track listings ==
=== CD ===
No.	Title	Length
1.	"English Summer Rain (Single Version)"	3:10
2.	"I'll Be Yours (Version 4am)"

=== Enhanced CD ===
No.	Title	Length
1.	"English Summer Rain (Album Version)"	4:00
2.	"English Summer Rain (Ecstasy of St Theresa Remix)"
3.	"This Picture (Junior Sanchez Remix)"
4.	"English Summer Rain" (exclusive animated video)

=== CD ===
No.	Title	Length
1.	"English Summer Rain (Album Version)"	4:00
2.	"English Summer Rain (Ecstasy of St Theresa Remix)"
3.	"This Picture (Junior Sanchez Remix)"

=== 7" vinyl ===
No.	Title	Length
1.	"English Summer Rain (Single Version)"	3:10
2.	"This Picture (Junior Sanchez Remix)"
3.	"The Ballad Of Melody Nelson"
