= B3 (EP) =

B3EP

EP by Placebo
- Released: 15 October 2012
- Recorded: Strongroom, RAK Studios, London; Metal Works, Toronto, Canada
- Genre: Alternative rock
- Length: 23:56
- Label: Vertigo
- Producer: David Bottrill, Adam Noble, Placebo

Placebo chronology
Live at Angkor Wat (2011)	B3EP (2012)	Loud Like Love (2013)

Singles from B3EP
- 1. "B3" Released: 8 October 2012

B3EP (often referred to as simply B3) is an EP by alternative rock band Placebo, released on 15 October 2012 through record label Vertigo.

== History ==
In 2010, band members Brian Molko and Stefan Olsdal began to publicly state that they were working on material for another studio album. On 23 November 2011, the band announced via their Facebook page and official website that they would return to the studio in 2012 to record their seventh studio album. Placebo confirmed in late May 2012 that they expect to release some tracks by the end of year, and that they have been assisted by Adam Noble (Red Hot Chili Peppers, dEUS) on a new album which will be released by the Northern Hemisphere summer in 2013. In August 2012, Molko revealed on Italy's Rai Radio 2 that a new single entitled "B3" would be released in September and a new album is expected to be released in March 2013.

On 14 September 2012, the band announced that they would release a five-track EP titled B3 on 12 October.

== Release ==
B3EP was released on 15 October through record label Vertigo, three days later than predicted. It reached no. 65 in the UK album charts.

A music video was released for the title track on 17 October.

== Critical reception ==
Professional ratings
Review scores
Source	Rating
Consequence of Sound	3/5 stars

The only professional review came from Consequence of Sound. Reviewer Katherine Flynn, after criticising the band's previous album, 2009's Battle for the Sun, which she wrote "didn't feel as urgent, or as true, as anything that had come before [in Placebo's canon]", saw B3 as a "[return] to their loud, largely minor-key hijinks" and writing that the EP "kicks", citing the ending track "Time Is Money" as a highlight.

== Track listing ==
All tracks are written by Placebo (Brian Molko, Stefan Olsdal and Steve Forrest), except as noted

No.	Title	Writer(s)	Length
1.	"B3"		4:10
2.	"I Know You Want to Stop" (Minxus cover)	Joseph Whitney, Gavin Pearce, She Rocola	3:04
3.	"The Extra"		4:20
4.	"I.K.W.Y.L."		5:10
5.	"Time Is Money"		7:15

== Personnel ==
Placebo

- Brian Molko – uncredited performance, production on tracks 2 and 4
- Stefan Olsdal – uncredited performance, production on tracks 2 and 4
- Steve Forrest – uncredited performance, production on tracks 2 and 4

Additional personnel

- Fiona Brice – string arrangements on track 3

Technical

- David Bottrill – production on tracks 3 and 5
- Adam Noble – production on track 1, mixing on tracks 1 and 2
- Alan Moulder – mixing on tracks 3 and 5
- Neil Comber – mixing on track 4
- Tim Young – mastering
- Helena Berg – cover design, sleeve photography
- Anthony Crook – sleeve design
