= Protège-moi =

Single by Placebo

from the album Once More with Feeling: Singles 1996–2004
- Released: 8 April 2004
- Recorded: Early 2003
- Genre: Alternative rock
- Length: 3:17
- Label: Virgin
- Songwriter: Placebo
- Producer: Jim Abbiss

Placebo singles chronology
"English Summer Rain" (2004)	"Protège-moi" (2004)	"Twenty Years" (2004)

"Protège-moi" is a single by English alternative rock band Placebo, which was released in France only, on 8 April 2004. It was featured on their 2004 greatest hits album Once More with Feeling: Singles 1996–2004.

== Content ==
The song is a French language version of "Protect Me from What I Want" from their fourth album, Sleeping with Ghosts. The chorus remains in English, although the French title is sung in the background. It has been translated to French by Virginie Despentes.

== Music video ==
The original music video for "Protège-moi", directed by Gaspar Noé, was never officially released as it was too sexually explicit to be shown, featuring uncensored nudity, heavy petting, fellatio, and cunnilingus. The video eventually put out for the song is an extract from the Soulmates Never Die (Live in Paris 2003) DVD.

== Track listing ==
1. "Protège-moi" – 3:14
2. "This Picture" – 3:36
