= Sleeping with Ghosts =

Studio album by Placebo
- Released: 24 March 2003
- Recorded: 2002–2003
- Studios: The Town House and Sarm West in London, England
- Genres: Alternative rock; electronic rock; post-punk revival
- Length: 46:32
- Labels: Virgin; Hut
- Producer: Jim Abbiss

Placebo chronology
Black Market Music (2000)	Sleeping with Ghosts (2003)	Covers (2003)

Singles from Sleeping with Ghosts
- 1. "The Bitter End" Released: 10 March 2003; 2. "This Picture" Released: 16 June 2003; 3. "Special Needs" Released: 15 September 2003; 4. "English Summer Rain" Released: 24 February 2004

Sleeping with Ghosts is the fourth studio album by British alternative rock band Placebo. It was recorded from late 2002 to early 2003 and released on 24 March 2003 by record labels Virgin and Hut.

Sleeping with Ghosts reached number 11 in the UK Albums Chart, and received a generally favourable reaction from music critics.

== Content ==
Frontman Brian Molko, who is known to be a fan of the band Sonic Youth, references lyrics from their album Sister on "Plasticine" ("Beauty lies inside the eye of another youthful dream" directly references "Beauty lies in the eyes of another's dream" from Sonic Youth's "Beauty Lies in the Eye").

The album has several songs based on a theme of relationships, such as relationships that end badly ("The Bitter End"), power struggles in relationships ("Special Needs") or the idea that some are meant to be eternal soulmates (the title track). Brian Molko told Kerrang! magazine: "I'm looking back to what's happened in my past emotional decade, trying to understand it. Trying to exorcise the ghosts and the demons of relationships past. It's the old cliché of it being therapeutic but it does work for me in that way."

Another interview has Molko explaining:

The album title's about carrying the ghosts of your relationships with you, to the point where sometimes a smell or a situation or an item of clothing they bought brings a person back. For me it's about the relationship that you have with your memories. They inhabit your dreams sometimes. There can be a lot in the future that's gonna remind you of the ghost of relationships past. So I see the album as a collection of short stories about a handful of relationships. Most of them mine. In a way writing the songs helps me to get a lot of the nasty feelings off my chest and put them in a box, and therefore have a bit more of an objective discourse with those emotions because you've done something positive with them, you've rid yourself of them.

== Release ==
Sleeping with Ghosts was released in March 2003. The CD came with the Copy Control protection system in some regions. It reached number 11 in the UK Albums Chart.

A Special Edition version of the album was released on 22 September 2003 worldwide, featuring a diverse selection of cover versions that the band had recorded in previous years. This was re-released as a download-only album in 2007 under the name Covers. This is their last album released under Hut.

== Reception ==
Professional ratings
Aggregate scores
Source	Rating
Metacritic	64/100
Review scores
Source	Rating
AllMusic	3/5 stars
The A.V. Club	favourable
Blender	2/5 stars
Filter	85%
Mojo	2/5 stars
Pitchfork	6.4/10
PopMatters	mixed
Q	4/5 stars
Rolling Stone	3/5 stars
Uncut	4/10

Sleeping with Ghosts received "Generally favorable reviews" from critics, and holds an approval rating of 64 out of 100 on Metacritic.

Michael Idov of Pitchfork wrote "No peaks, no gorges, just a steady oscillation between adequate and inspired. Sleeping with Ghosts is a remarkably level collection of guitar pop, simultaneously less glammy and less pungent than Placebo's earlier stuff." Mojo wrote "There's some terrific and accessible stuff here [...] but the result is still an album that retreads old Placebo themes." Q magazine called it "spikily brilliant".

== Track listing ==
All tracks written and performed by Placebo

No.	Title	Length
1.	"Bulletproof Cupid"	2:22
2.	"English Summer Rain"	4:01
3.	"This Picture"	3:34
4.	"Sleeping with Ghosts"	4:38
5.	"The Bitter End"	3:10
6.	"Something Rotten"	5:28
7.	"Plasticine"	3:26
8.	"Special Needs"	5:15
9.	"I'll Be Yours"	3:32
10.	"Second Sight"	2:49
11.	"Protect Me from What I Want"	3:15
12.	"Centrefolds"	5:02
Total length:		46:32

Japanese edition bonus tracks
No.	Title	Length
13.	"Evalia"	4:20
14.	"Drink You Pretty"	3:55

European bonus tracks
No.	Title	Length
13.	"Slackerbitch"	3:24
14.	"Eyesight to the Blind"	2:58
15.	"Miss Moneypenny"	2:50
16.	"Then the Clouds Will Open for Me"	4:19
17.	"Waiting for the Son of Man"	4:10
18.	"Leeloo"	4:19
19.	"ION"	4:08

Special Edition bonus track
No.	Title	Length
13.	"Protège-moi"	3:13

Special Edition bonus disc: Covers
No.	Title	Writer(s)	Length
1.	"Running Up That Hill" (originally by Kate Bush)	Kate Bush	4:57
2.	"Where Is My Mind?" (originally by Pixies)	Black Francis	3:44
3.	"Bigmouth Strikes Again" (originally by The Smiths)	Johnny Marr, Morrissey	3:54
4.	"Johnny and Mary" (originally by Robert Palmer)	Robert Palmer	3:25
5.	"20th Century Boy" (originally by T. Rex)	Marc Bolan	3:40
6.	"The Ballad of Melody Nelson" (originally by Serge Gainsbourg)	Serge Gainsbourg	3:58
7.	"Holocaust" (originally by Big Star)	Alex Chilton	4:27
8.	"I Feel You" (originally by Depeche Mode)	Martin Gore	6:26
9.	"Daddy Cool" (originally by Boney M.)	Frank Farian, George Reyam	3:21
10.	"Jackie" (originally by Sinéad O'Connor)	Sinéad O'Connor	2:48

== Charts and certifications ==
=== Weekly charts ===
Chart (2003)	Peak position
Australian Albums (ARIA)	11
Austrian Albums (Ö3 Austria)	6
Belgian Albums (Ultratop Flanders)	4
Belgian Albums (Ultratop Wallonia)	1
Danish Albums (Hitlisten)	28
Dutch Albums (Album Top 100)	19
Finnish Albums (Suomen virallinen lista)	14
French Albums (SNEP)	1
German Albums (Offizielle Top 100)	2
Greek Albums (IFPI)	4
Irish Albums (IRMA)	14
Italian Albums (FIMI)	6
New Zealand Albums (RMNZ)	37
Norwegian Albums (VG-lista)	12
Polish Albums (ZPAV)	10
Portuguese Albums (AFP)	4
Scottish Albums (Official Charts)	13
Swedish Albums (Sverigetopplistan)	14
Swiss Albums (Schweizer Hitparade)	3
UK Albums (Official Charts)	11

=== Year-end charts ===
Chart (2003)	Position
Austrian Albums (Ö3 Austria)	41
Belgian Albums (Ultratop Flanders)	35
Belgian Albums (Ultratop Wallonia)	5
French Albums (SNEP)	13
German Albums (Offizielle Top 100)	32
Swiss Albums (Schweizer Hitparade)	30
UK Albums (OCC)	179

Chart (2004)	Position
French Albums (SNEP)	17

== Certifications and sales ==
Region	Certification	Certified units/sales
Austria (IFPI Austria)	Gold	15,000^{*}
Belgium (BRMA)	Gold	25,000^{*}
Germany (BVMI)	Platinum	200,000^{^}
France (SNEP)	2× Platinum	600,000^{*}
Greece (IFPI Greece)	Gold	10,000^{^}
Portugal (AFP)	Silver	10,000^{^}
Switzerland (IFPI Switzerland)	Gold	20,000^{^}
United Kingdom (BPI)	Gold	100,000^{^}
United Kingdom (BPI) reissue	Silver	60,000^{‡}
United States	—	61,000
Summaries
Europe (IFPI)	Platinum	1,000,000^{*}
^{*} Sales figures based on certification alone.^{^} Shipments figures based on certification alone.^{‡} Sales+streaming figures based on certification alone.

== Personnel ==
Placebo

- Brian Molko – vocals, guitar, keyboards, saxophone on "Something Rotten", drums on "English Summer Rain"
- Steve Hewitt – drums, percussion
- Stefan Olsdal – bass guitar, guitar, keyboards, piano, backing vocals

Additional personnel

- Simon Breed – harmonica on "Protect Me from What I Want"

Technical personnel

- Jim Abbiss – production
- Jean Baptiste Mondino – sleeve art direction and photography
- Jim Barny – mixing at Mayfair Studios, recording at Townhouse Studios and Sarm West Studios
- Andy Davies – engineering assistance at Sarm West Studios
- Bill Lloyd – additional recording, engineering
- Sean Magee – mastering at Abbey Road Studios
- Fergus Peterkin – engineering assistance at Mayfair Studios
- Danny Porter – engineering assistance at Townhouse Studios
- See Studio – sleeve design and art direction
- Tom Stanley – engineering assistance at Townhouse Studios
