= Black-Eyed =

2001 single by Placebo

Single by Placebo

from the album Black Market Music
- Released: 8 October 2001
- Genre: Alternative rock
- Length: 3:49
- Label: Virgin
- Songwriters: Steve Hewitt, Brian Molko and Stefan Olsdal
- Producers: Paul Corkett and Placebo

Placebo singles chronology
"Special K" (2001)	"Black-Eyed" (2001)	"The Bitter End" (2003)

"Black-Eyed" is a song by English alternative rock band Placebo. It was released on 8 October 2001 as a single from their third studio album, 2000's Black Market Music. The song tells the story of a character with a troubled childhood, bitterly affecting their development: "I'm forever black-eyed / A product of a broken home".

The official music video includes scenes from the 2001 German film Engel & Joe.

Reviews of the song ranged between it being called "clumsy posturing" and applauded that as "things start getting mellower and darker [...] One of the nicest being 'Black-Eyed', which sees the electronics politely let the guitars have a go between wailed choruses. In fact, alongside current single 'Slave to the Wage', this is possibly a favourite moment on the album."

== Live performance history ==
The song was played throughout the Black Market Music and Sleeping With Ghosts tours. It has made intermittent appearances on the Meds and Battle for the Sun tours, at shows in the earlier legs of said tours. The song was also being performed as part of the band's 2012 tour.

== Track listing ==
1. "Black-Eyed"
2. "Pure Morning (MBV Remix)"
3. "Black-Eyed (Le Vibrator Remix)"
