= Special Needs (song) =

Single by Placebo

from the album Sleeping with Ghosts
- Released: 15 September 2003
- Genre: Alternative rock, shoegaze
- Label: Elevator Music; Hut; Virgin
- Songwriter(s): Steve Hewitt; Brian Molko; Stefan Olsdal
- Producer(s): Jim Abbiss

Placebo singles chronology
"This Picture" (2003)	"Special Needs" (2003)	"English Summer Rain" (2004)

"Special Needs" is a song by English alternative rock band Placebo. It was released as the third single from their fourth studio album, Sleeping with Ghosts, on 15 September 2003. It peaked at No. 27 in the UK Singles Chart.

== Music video ==
The music video for "Special Needs" was filmed in a disused swimming pool in Hackney. It alternates between showing the three band members playing the song and featuring a couple, apparently separated, reminiscing their relationship and making out. The female part in the video was played by Caroline Farrington.

== Track listing ==
All tracks are written by Placebo (Steve Hewitt, Brian Molko and Stefan Olsdal)

CD
No.	Title	Length
1.	"Special Needs (Edit)"	3:28
2.	"English Summer Rain (Freelance Hellraiser Mix)"	3:40
3.	"Plasticine (Lounge Version)"	4:06

7" vinyl

1. "Special Needs"
2. "English Summer Rain (Freelance Hellraiser Mix)"

DVD

- "Special Needs" (video)
- "Making of the Video"
- "Special Needs (Album Version)"
- "The Bitter End (Junior Sanchez Mix)"

== Personnel ==
- Helena Berg – sleeve photography and art direction
