= Special K (song) =

Single by Placebo

from the album Black Market Music
- Released: 19 March 2001
- Recorded: Late 1999 – mid 2000 at Olympic Studios, Townhouse Studios and Moody Studios, London
- Genre: Alternative rock; post-punk revival
- Length: 3:51
- Label: Virgin; Hut
- Songwriters: Steve Hewitt; Brian Molko; Stefan Olsdal
- Producers: Paul Corkett; Placebo

Placebo singles chronology
| "Slave to the Wage" (2000) | "Special K" (2001) | "Black-Eyed" (2001) |

"Special K" is a single by British alternative rock band Placebo, released on 19 March 2001 on CD and 12" vinyl, taken from their third album, Black Market Music. The title is slang for ketamine, and the song itself is supposed to explore "the link between drugs and love," and "Special K" is uppers and the rush of falling in love."

== Release plans and censorship changes ==
The band originally planned to release the single in the UK as a two part CD set as well as a 12" vinyl release. However, several radio stations refused to play the single due to its lyrical content, which would prevent the song from charting highly. Undeterred, the band reshuffled the release into one 7-track enhanced EP for CD, which would be ineligible for the charts. They issued a statement via their official fan club website, which read:

"The British Music Industry which has recently been championing disposable, facile pop and music which promotes homophobia, misogyny and violence has in it's [sic] infinite wisdom, taken offence to the lyrical content of our new single 'Special K'.

"This combined with our ongoing dissatisfaction with the two CD system, since we feel it rips off genuine music fans, has forced us to take the decision to bypass the system completely. 'Special K' will therefore be released on one single, available at regular CD single price, and comprise of 8 items which will make it non chart eligible.

"We feel this is the best deal for our fans and that it drives home the statement that we don't care about chart positions.

"Take care and have respect for each other. Keep the faith and never let the sycophants and small minded people of this world get you down.

Sincerely, Brian Molko Stefan Olsdal Steven Hewitt"

== Music video ==
The music video is reminiscent of such sci-fi films as Fantastic Voyage; it depicts Brian Molko and the other members of the band in an undisclosed, scientific headquarters where Molko is shrunk down to microbiological proportions and accidentally dropped into the mouth of drummer Steve Hewitt. The music video in its entirety maintains a sci-fi aesthetic throughout. The video ends with a shrunken Molko being sucked out through Hewitts's tear duct.

== Composition ==
The song was written and composed in C♯ major.

== Track listing ==
UK CD1 - Cancelled

1. Special K - 3:51
2. Dub Psychosis - 3:38
3. Passive Aggressive (Brothers in Rhythm remix) - 9:03

UK CD2 - Cancelled

1. Special K (Timo Maas remix) - 7:30
2. Little Mo - 3:02
3. Slave to the Wage (I Can't Believe It's a Remix) - 3:30
4. Special K [Enhanced Video]

CD EP

1. Special K - 3:51
2. Dub Psychosis - 3:38
3. Passive Aggressive (Brothers in Rhythm remix) - 9:03
4. Special K (Timo Maas remix) - 7:30
5. Little Mo - 3:02
6. Slave to the Wage (I Can't Believe It's a Remix) - 3:30
7. Special K (Timo Maas Dub mix) - 7:02
8. Special K [Enhanced Video]

CD Single - Europe

1. Special K - 3:51
2. Dub Psychosis - 3:38
3. Passive Aggressive (Brothers in Rhythm remix) - 9:03

CD Single - Australia

1. Special K - 3:51
2. Slave to the Wage (Radio Edit) - 3:46
3. Slave to the Wage (I Can't Believe It's a Remix) - 3:30
4. Johnny and Mary - 3:24
5. Slave to the Wage [Enhanced Video]

12" EP

1. Special K - 3:51
2. Dub Psychosis - 3:38
3. Passive Aggressive (Brothers in Rhythm remix) - 9:03
4. Special K (Timo Maas remix) - 7:30
5. Little Mo - 3:02
6. Slave to the Wage (I Can't Believe It's a Remix) - 3:30

== Charts ==
| Chart (2001) | Peak position |
|---|---|
| Australia (ARIA) | 50 |
| Belgium (Ultratip Bubbling Under Wallonia) | 45 |
| France (SNEP) | 60 |
| Italy (FIMI) | 18 |
