= Placebo (band) =

British alternative rock band

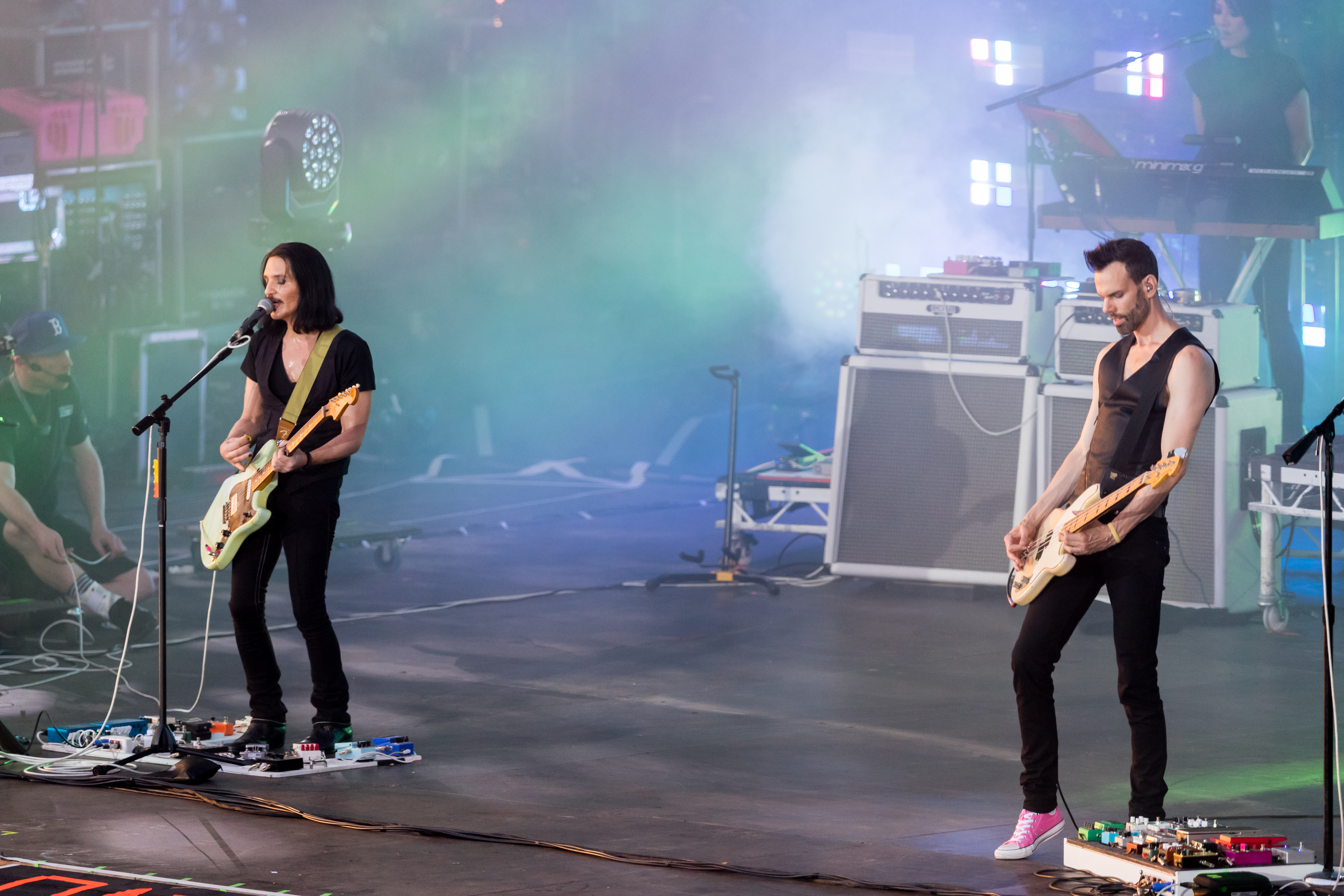
- Placebo live in 2022. From left to right: Brian Molko and Stefan Olsdal

Background information
- Also known as: Ashtray Heart
- Origin: London, England
- Genre: Alternative rock
- Years active: 1994–present
- Labels: Hut; Virgin; Astralwerks; Universal; Kobalt; SO Recordings; Rise
- Members: Brian Molko; Stefan Olsdal
- Past members: Robert Schultzberg; Steve Hewitt; Steve Forrest
- Website: www.placeboworld.co.uk

Placebo (/pləˈsiːboʊ/ plə-SEE-boh) are a British alternative rock band, formed in London in 1994 by vocalist-guitarist Brian Molko and bassist-guitarist Stefan Olsdal, who have remained the two constant members, with three full-time drummers throughout the band's existence.

Molko and Olsdal were joined by drummer Robert Schultzberg for a demo, a split single, and their eponymous debut album in 1996. Shortly after the album's release, Steve Hewitt replaced Schultzberg on drums. Placebo gained exposure in 1997 after the single "Nancy Boy" (a song notorious at the time for its gender-bending content) became popular in the UK. The band stood out amongst the Britpop scene of the time because of their androgynous appearance and musical content, as well as Molko's distinctive voice and lyrics which openly discussed sexuality, mental health, and drug use. Their 1998 album Without You I’m Nothing was a massive international breakthrough, going platinum in the UK and gold in France. It spawned a pair of UK top-five singles for the band, "Pure Morning" and "You Don't Care About Us", as well as the No. 11 hit "Every You Every Me".

Hewitt left Placebo in 2007 due to personal and musical differences. He was replaced the following year by Steve Forrest. Placebo released two albums with Forrest, who left in 2015 to pursue his own musical career. Since 2015, Placebo have officially been a duo, though augmented with studio and live musicians.

Placebo have collaborated with various artists over the years, including David Bowie, Justin Warfield, Michael Stipe, and Alison Mosshart. Placebo have released eight studio albums (all of which have reached the Top 20 in the UK), recorded 15 top-40 singles in the UK, and have sold around 14 million records worldwide.

== History ==
=== Formation (1994–1995) ===
Placebo founders Brian Molko and Stefan Olsdal had both attended the American International School of Luxembourg, although they did not interact at the time as they were part of different social circles. The two met by chance in 1994, in London, England. At the time, Olsdal was taking guitar lessons and was on his way home when he met Molko at the South Kensington tube station. Molko, observing that Olsdal had a guitar strapped to his back, invited Olsdal to watch him perform at a local gig. On the strength of Molko's performance, Olsdal decided that they should start a band. The two formed as Ashtray Heart, named after the Captain Beefheart song of the same name. Molko, however, denied in 2009 that Ashtray Heart was the first name of the band, dismissing this as a rumour and claiming that the band had more names initially.

Originally, the two were unable to decide on a drummer. They played for a while with Steve Hewitt, a friend of Molko, but Hewitt had prior commitments to local band Breed. Robert Schultzberg assumed the position of drummer in late 1994.

The band eventually chose the name Placebo, due to its meaning in Latin, "I shall please". Molko has frequently stated in interviews that the name is a rejoinder to the 1990s cliché of naming one's band after a drug. In an interview, Molko stated:

It's a complex question to answer, really. As musicians you try to find a name for your band that represents you and you never really do, because, basically, names for bands lose their meaning after a while. They become a series of sounds that you associate with people in music. The most important thing for a name is that you can imagine forty-thousand people screaming it in unison.

=== Debut album, line-up change and glam connection (1996–1998) ===
In October 1995, the band released "Bruise Pristine", a split single with the band Soup, on Fierce Panda. Molko would later speak in negative terms about this release.

By 1996, Placebo were signed with Caroline Records. Their debut album, the self-titled Placebo, was released on 17 June 1996. The album was produced by Brad Wood and was influenced, according to Molko, by Sonic Youth and Depeche Mode. The release peaked at No. 5 on the UK Albums Chart at the height of the Britpop era: their highest-charting album in the country until 2022. After the album's release, Placebo went on a headline tour across Europe, performing in countries including France, Italy, and Switzerland. When reviewing a concert, the New York Times compared them to bands of the "first wave of post-punk rock, particularly New Order, the Cure, Siouxsie and the Banshees, early U2 and Talking Heads".

Tension between Schultzberg and the rest of the group had begun to rise in the previous year. The band initially fired him in September 1995, but he was rehired to record the first seven-inch single "Bruise Pristine". After an argument in August 1996, Molko decided that it would be best for the band if Schultzberg left. The band came to an agreement that Schultzberg would leave once they had finished the promotion of Placebo.

Eventually, Schultzberg did indeed leave the band in September 1996, on a United States tour. Before going on stage for their first show in the state of New York, Olsdal informed Schultzberg that he wasn't going on the tour in Germany that was following the US one. At the manager's request, Schultzberg did two more shows with the band in Paris after the US tour, the last of which was a performance on the French TV show Nulle part ailleurs. According to Schultzberg "Molko said that he was 'tired of being the focus of Robert's rages against the world', and quite frankly, I was tired of being his". While Schultzberg was with the band, several early works were recorded, including their first 7" single "Bruise Pristine", the "Come Home" EP, the single version of "Nancy Boy" (with B-sides "Slackerbitch", "Miss Moneypenny" and the Smiths cover "Bigmouth Strikes Again") and their eponymous debut album. On the track "I Know", Schultzberg played didgeridoo as well as drums.

Steve Hewitt, who had played with the band in 1994, joined Placebo as a full-time member at Molko's request.

Bill Lloyd, who had met the band in 1993, had taken on some of their sound engineering and driving work. By 1996, he had played with them as a touring musician.

The most successful song on the debut album was "Nancy Boy", which peaked at number 4 in the UK Singles Chart upon its release in 1997. The song had been written in 1994, being partially inspired by an infamous quote of Suede's Brett Anderson: "I'm a bisexual man who's never had a homosexual experience." Its lyrics were full of sexual allusions, and Molko admitted at the time: "It's not absurd. It's obscene. A song this rude should not be number four in the charts." Molko would go on to describe his relationship with the song in a 2016 interview as "very ambivalent", adding that, although he appreciates the fact that the song had been instrumental in their development as a band, he considers it immature.

The song attracted the attention of David Bowie, who invited the band to open several of his concerts in early 1996. The following January, Bowie invited them to play at his 50th birthday celebrations at New York's Madison Square Garden. The party also included Billy Corgan of the Smashing Pumpkins, Robert Smith of the Cure and Lou Reed.

The band's glam rock connections continued. In 1998, Placebo recorded a cover of T. Rex's "20th Century Boy" for the Velvet Goldmine soundtrack and the band appeared in minor roles in the film. Bowie made a special appearance on-stage with Placebo during a tour stop in New York as part of the band's late February tour with Stabbing Westward. Placebo played "20th Century Boy" live with David Bowie at the BRIT Awards show in 1999.

Placebo were heavily criticised by the media due to their unorthodox attitude and Brian Molko's androgynous appearance. In a 2016 interview related to their early years, Molko commented:

We were reacting very strongly against the machismo, terrace chants and revisionism of Britpop, and the nationalism that we interpreted as xenophobia of the musical kind. We were trying to make a strong political statement about the fluidity of sexuality with the dresses and make-up that we wore. We set out to confuse, and I guess Nancy Boy was the perfect soundtrack to that.

=== Without You I'm Nothing and Black Market Music (1998–2002) ===
"Pure Morning"
A sample of the track "Pure Morning" from Without You I'm Nothing (1998), which helped expose the band to the US market.

In 1998, Placebo switched to the major label Virgin Records, and issued their follow-up album Without You I'm Nothing on 12 October. The band had a dysfunctional relationship with producer Steve Osborne during the recording of the album, and ended up not speaking to him at all by the time the sessions were over.

The album was another large seller in the UK. The US market embraced the album's lead single "Pure Morning", which appeared on MTV and reached number 20 on the Billboard Heatseekers chart, but subsequent singles and videos failed to match the success of its predecessor. "Pure Morning" became Placebo’s highest charting single in the U.S., peaking at number 19 on the Billboard Modern Rock Tracks. "Pure Morning" enjoyed the same success as "Nancy Boy" in the UK, reaching number 4 in the British chart. The video of the song was nominated for the Best British Video award during the 1999 edition of Brit Awards, but lost to Robbie Williams' "Millennium". Molko subsequently deemed the lyrics of "Pure Morning" as unsatisfying, and refused to perform the song live for nine years.

The band kept enjoying success in the UK, as the second single, "You Don't Care About Us" reached number 5 in the British chart. The third single released was "Every You Every Me", a number eleven hit. The song appeared on the soundtrack for the film Cruel Intentions, which was inspired by the novel Les Liaisons dangereuses by Pierre Choderlos de Laclos.

The last single on the album, "Without You I'm Nothing" was re-recorded and released as a duet with David Bowie, at Bowie's request. Molko would describe this moment in 2016 as an honour, adding that he realised its importance much later in his career.

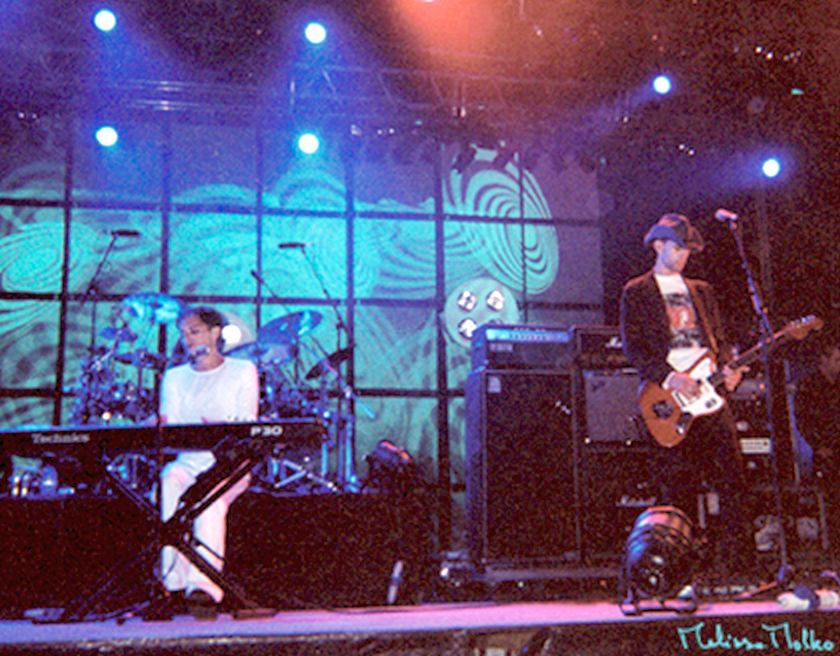
Placebo in concert at MEO Sudoeste, 2001. Left: Brian Molko. Right: Stefan Olsdal.

The band's third album, Black Market Music, released in October 2000, and produced by Paul Corkett, further experimented with genres outside of the traditional scope of rock. Placebo collaborated with Justin Warfield on "Spite & Malice" and sampled Pavement's "Texas Never Whispers" on "Slave to the Wage". A re-sequenced version released in the US featured a slightly different track listing, adding the aforementioned Bowie version of "Without You I'm Nothing" and the band's cover of Depeche Mode's "I Feel You".

The album generated additional UK top 20 hits in "Taste in Men" and "Slave to the Wage", which reached number 16 and 19 in the UK Singles Chart, respectively.

In a 2001 interview, Molko declared:

I think it's the album we always wanted to make. I think without exaggerating even the tiniest bit, we love it and we've never been so happy with an album. Our debut was fast and rough, punk pop, Without You I'm Nothing showed our melancholy, depressed side and Black Market shows a perfect combination of both sides.

The singer would later become more reserved towards Black Market Music, describing it in 2016 as "real somber", and expressing the regret of not having been involved enough during the production phase.

Placebo encountered resistance from the British music industry upon release of the single "Special K" due to its reference of a ketamine high as a simile for love. Due to this metaphor, the song was censored in the UK. In spite of the controversy, Black Market Music reached number 1 in France and number 6 in the UK.

=== Sleeping with Ghosts and Once More with Feeling (2003–2005) ===
Placebo released their fourth album, produced by Jim Abbiss and named Sleeping with Ghosts, on 24 March 2003. The sound of the album was described in a Billboard review as being infused with "edgy electronic flourishes".

Molko explained the title of an album in an interview:

It is romantic without being sentimental. It's an album full of colour. It's also the first time when we recorded an album during the summer, after a long break. Before, we were in a sort of rock'n'roll bubble, we were alternating the studio sessions and the live concerts, we were pretty much cut off from the real world. It's dangerous to live too much in this kind of bubble. We had the chance to distance ourselves a bit from everything that happened since 1996 up until now. I also had the occasion to reflect to the montagne russe that is my personal life after these seven years. The ghosts I'm talking about are the people, the events you're wearing into your soul consciously or not.

The album went to No. 11 in the UK and sold 1.4 million copies worldwide. Australian tour dates with Elbow and UK shows with Har Mar Superstar followed in 2004.

First single "The Bitter End" peaked at number 12 in the British single chart. Protège-moi, the French version of the song "Protect Me From What I Want", was released as a single in France where it reached number 18.

At the end of 2003, the band released Sleeping with Ghosts Special Edition, which was a double-disc release, containing the Sleeping with Ghosts album and a bonus disc with ten covers. The bonus disc was re-released in 2010 as a stand-alone under the name Covers.

On 15 March 2004, the band released their first live DVD, Soulmates Never Die (Live in Paris 2003), from footage recorded in October 2003 and also including a 25-minute documentary.

On 25 October 2004, Placebo released a singles collection, Once More with Feeling: Singles 1996–2004, on both CD and as a DVD featuring the band's videos. The nineteen-song compilation included two new tracks, "I Do" and the single "Twenty Years", which reached number 18 in UK. The compilation was meant to allow the listener to observe Placebo's change of lyrics, music and attitude; Molko was highly critical of his early years, comparing in a 2005 interview the first singles with "bad teenage poetry you made at college".

On 5 November 2004, Placebo played a one-night-only gig at Wembley Arena, in which Robert Smith of The Cure made a guest appearance on two tracks, "Without You I'm Nothing" and a cover of The Cure's "Boys Don't Cry". This performance was to be their last UK gig until 2006. After the Wembley gig, Placebo went on a short Once More with Feeling tour in South America. On 2 July 2005 the group performed "Twenty Years" and "The Bitter End" at the Live 8 concert, at the Palais de Versailles in France.

=== Meds and Hewitt's departure (2006–2009) ===
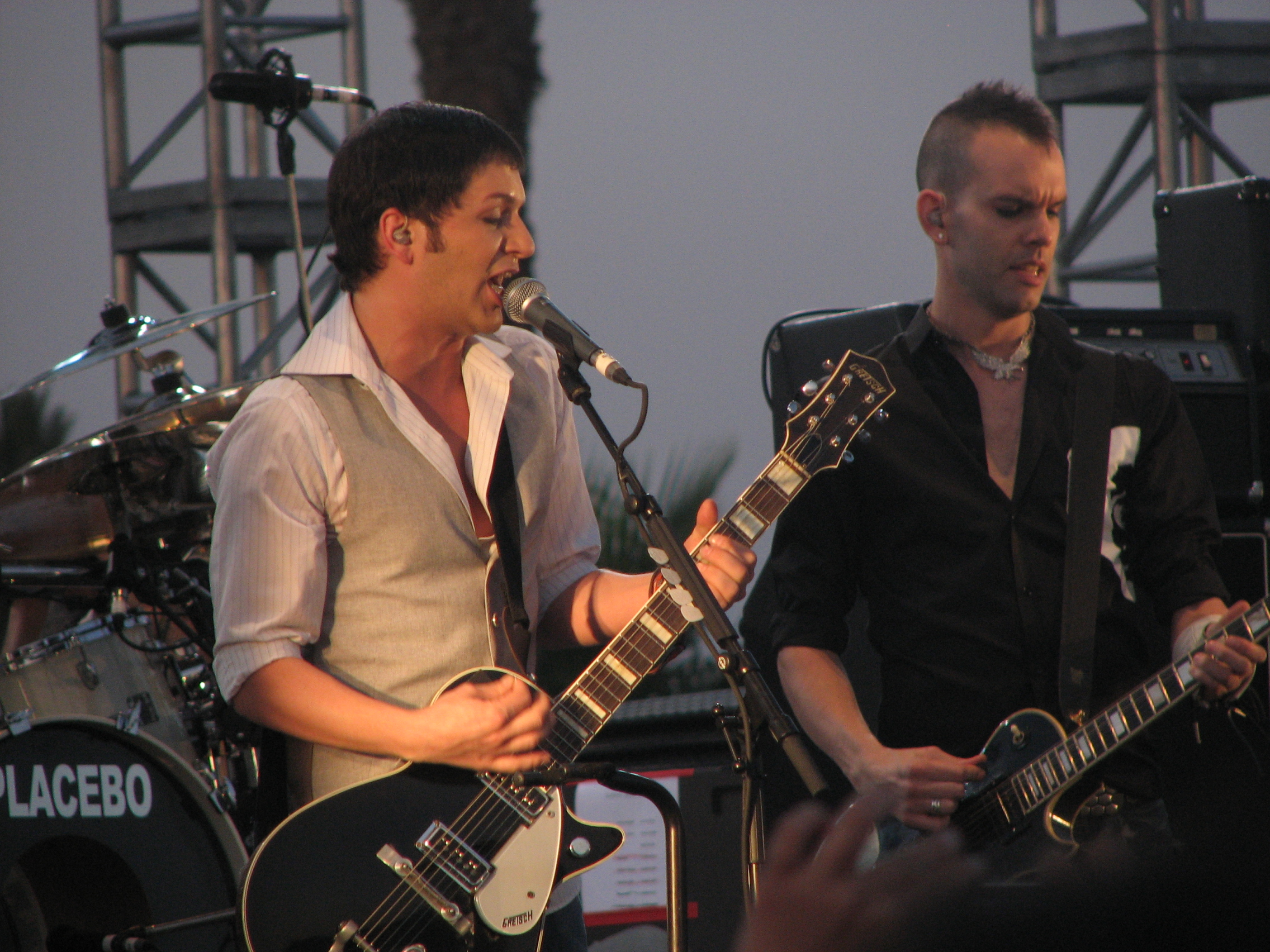
Molko and Olsdal at the Coachella Festival in April 2007. Steve Hewitt and most of his drum kit are out of view.

In September 2005, Placebo finished the recording phase of their fifth studio album, Meds, which was produced by Dimitri Tikovoi and released on 13 March 2006. The album was also released in a limited edition, containing a documentary, the lyrics, live videos, three demo versions and the song "Long Division". The version released in the US had two bonus tracks, "Running Up That Hill" and "UNEEDMEMORETHANINEEDU", but did not include "In the Cold Light of Morning" at Molko's demand, who refused to have the song censored. The lead single in the UK market was "Because I Want You", whereas in the rest of the world the first single was "Song to Say Goodbye" . Two tracks are duets with US singers: "Meds" with Alison Mosshart of The Kills and "Broken Promise" with R.E.M.'s Michael Stipe.

Meds was leaked to the internet on 17 January 2006, two months before the official release date. The leak was projected to cause a serious loss of profit by the band's record label Virgin Records. Nevertheless, in most countries the album charted well, at No. 1 in France, No. 4 in Australia and No. 7 in the UK.

In 2006 Placebo switched labels in the US to Astralwerks and re-released several revisions of their earlier works. In October their debut album, Placebo, was digitally remastered and re-released on 25 September 2006 with the subtitle 10th Anniversary Collectors Edition; the box set also included a DVD containing music videos, concerts and TV performances.

In 2007 Placebo joined Linkin Park, My Chemical Romance, Taking Back Sunday and various other acts for the annual Projekt: Revolution tour. Following the tour, Virgin released the Extended Play '07 EP as a simple introduction for new fans to the band's past decade of music. The compilation featured eight songs: "Nancy Boy", "Every You Every Me", "Taste in Men", "The Bitter End", "Meds", "Pure Morning", "Infra-Red" and "Running Up that Hill".

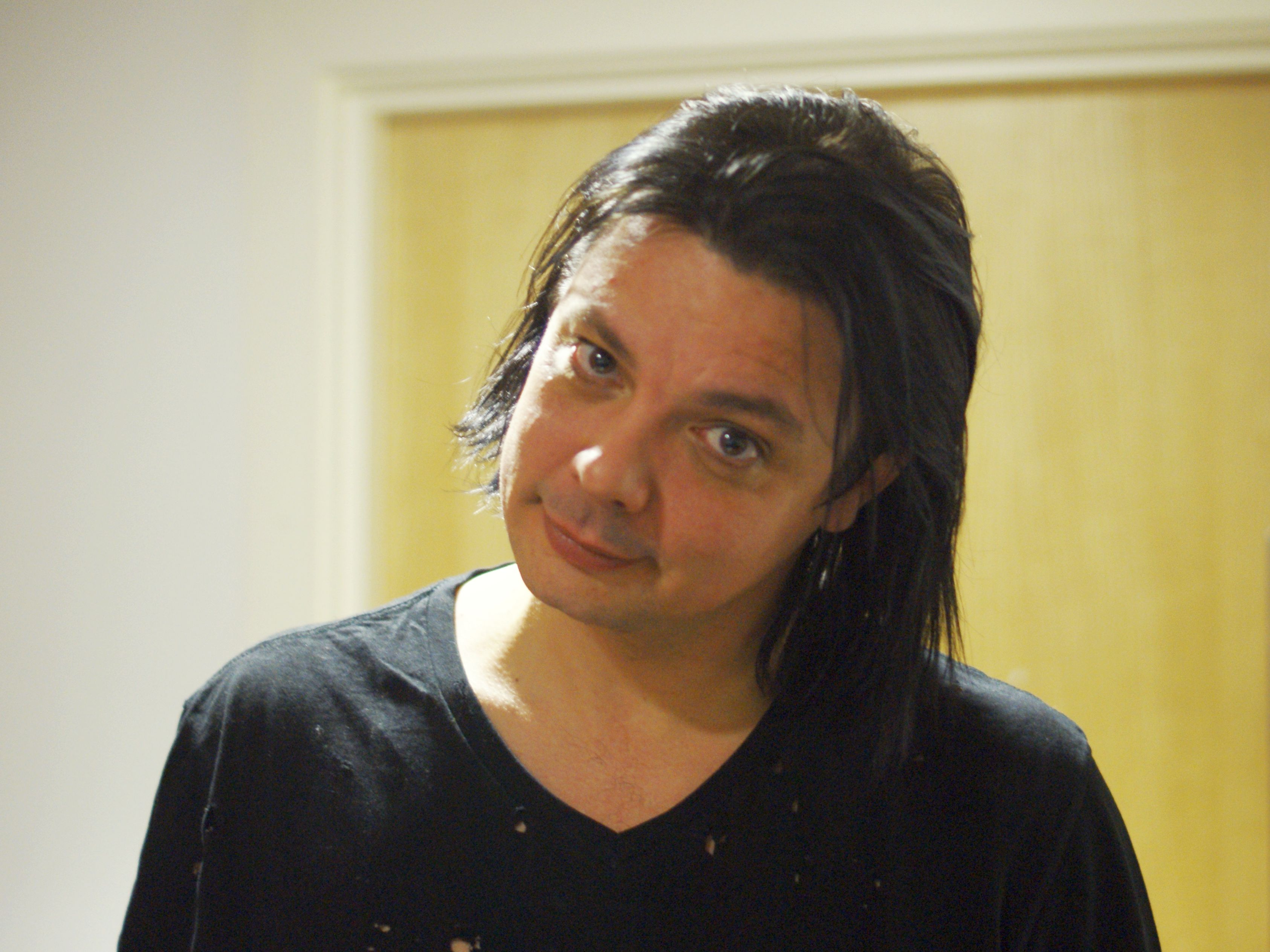
Former drummer Steve Hewitt left the band in 2008 due to personal and musical differences.

The relationship between Steve Hewitt and the rest of the band had become tense during the recording of Meds and eventually, in October 2007, the band announced that Hewitt was no longer in Placebo. Molko commented that "Being in a band is very much like being in a marriage, and in couples—in this case a triple—people can grow apart over the years. To say that you don't love your partner anymore is inaccurate, considering all that you've been through and achieved together. There simply comes a point when you realise that you want different things from your relationship and that you can no longer live under the same roof, so to speak". Olsdal commented "We couldn't go on with Steve Hewitt. We didn't have the same goals, nor the same vision anymore. We had to separate. It all went wrong during the Meds tour. [...] There was no communication between us. Brian and I are one, but at some point we even didn't talk to each other anymore. We realised Placebo was dying. To be able to go on, things had to change." According to Hewitt, "Alex Weston, our manager, [...] called me in to the office and said I was not in the band anymore. And that's it. I was thrown out". Hewitt claims that it was "very hurtful" and "disappointing" to have been ejected in this way after being in the band for over a decade. Early in 2008 Hewitt founded the band Love Amongst Ruin, switching to guitar and singing lead vocals. In August 2012 he became the drummer of the reformed Six by Seven.

In August 2008, the band announced their new drummer, Steve Forrest of the band Evaline.

Placebo gave one live performance in 2008, as part of an MTV EXIT event, a campaign against human trafficking held in Angkor Wat in December. Placebo left EMI in 2008, but the label released a ten-disc box set of the complete Placebo recordings on 8 June 2009, including all the studio albums and DVDs as well as a collection of B-sides.

=== Battle for the Sun (2009–2011) ===
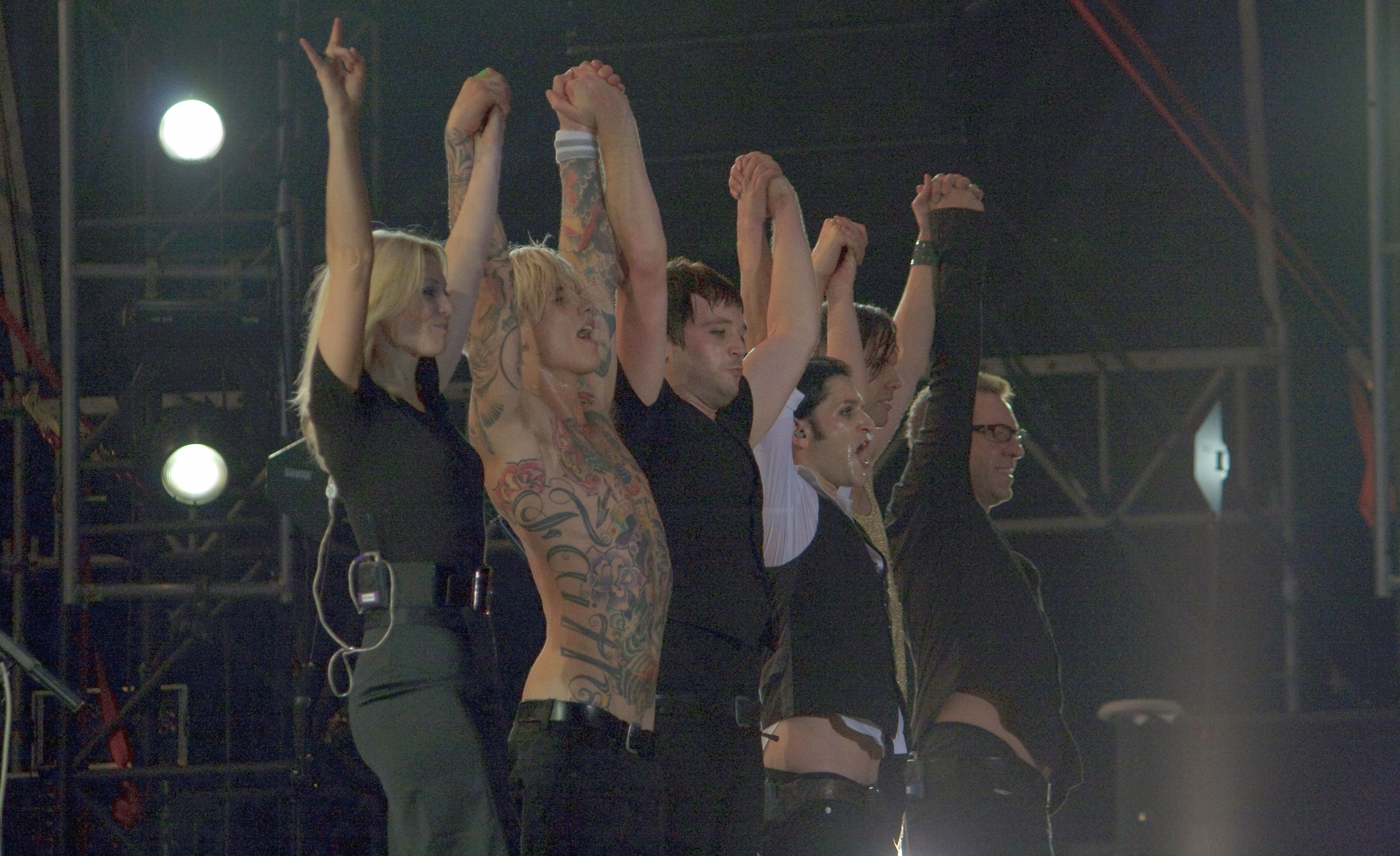
Placebo and their additional live lineup wave goodbye at Sziget Festival 2009. Left from right: Fiona Brice, Steve Forrest, Nick Gavrilovic, Brian Molko, Stefan Olsdal and Bill Lloyd.

In January 2009, Placebo announced that they signed with PIAS Entertainment, with Brian Molko commenting: "We were very lucky to have so many great labels interested in signing us, it means a lot, especially after 12 years of releasing records!"

Placebo also confirmed that they had finished working on the follow-up to 2006's Meds and planned to release it on 8 June 2009. The full track list was announced on the band's website in March 2009. The album, Battle for the Sun, was the first to feature new drummer Steve Forrest, and was recorded with producer David Bottrill, also known for his work with Tool, Muse, Peter Gabriel and Silverchair.

The album's title track "Battle for the Sun" debuted on Zane Lowe's BBC Radio 1 show on 17 March 2009. Subsequently, it became available for free download on the band's official website. On the same day as the track's debut, they played a secret concert in London, performing some of the material from the album, including the tracks "Ashtray Heart", "Julien", "Kitty Litter", "Speak in Tongues" and "Devil in the Details". In their review for the gig, Rock Sound wrote that "the new album is a heavier-sounding record compared to its predecessor" and recalls the atmosphere of Without You I'm Nothing. Molko would describe the album in 2013 as "the sound of a band trying to find a new identity, to find out who they were again".

The first single, "For What It's Worth", made its radio debut on 20 April 2009, with the official release date being 1 June. It became available for download on iTunes and eMusic on 21 April, and the video for the single premiered on MySpace at the same time.

In May 2009, Placebo performed three concerts in the UK, at venues in Sheffield, Bournemouth and London, before attending the festival season in Europe and Asia. When unveiling the new album with a full track-by-track rundown, Molko told the Scottish edition of News of the World: "It feels like a new beginning... we're reinvigorated, refreshed and ready to take on the world".

From 29 to 31 May 2009 fans who signed up for Placebo's official mailing list received a unique code for logging into five listenings of the album in its entirety.

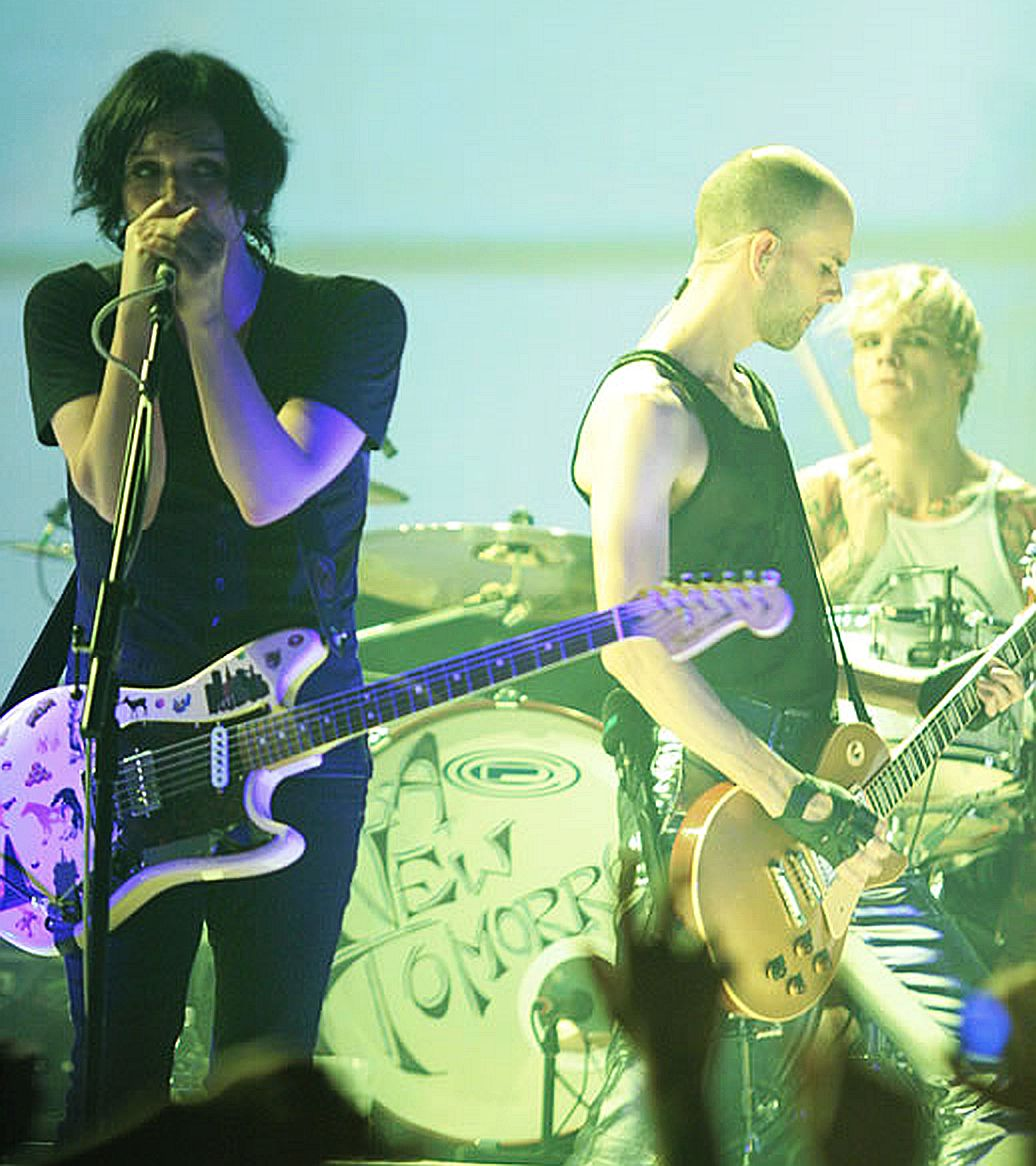
Placebo in 2009. From left: Molko, Olsdal and Forrest

At the beginning of August 2009, Placebo canceled a concert in Osaka, Japan, after singer Brian Molko fainted on stage. The band later explained in an official statement that the singer had picked up a virus, which, combined with jet lag and exhaustion, resulted in him collapsing. Following this incident, Placebo also canceled their North American tour.

On 5 November 2009, Placebo won the MTV Europe Music Awards for Best Alternative.

In December 2009, Placebo released iTunes Live: London Festival '09, a live album recorded at the iTunes Festival at The Roundhouse, Camden on 14 July 2009.

In February–April 2010, the band toured Southeast Asia, Australia and South America. The final leg of the tour saw Placebo play Israel and Lebanon, before returning to Europe for a series of festivals and featured concerts. A performance in Thessaloniki, Greece in September 2010 was poorly received by the crowd, sparking boos from a crowd of thousands after performing a 50-minute set.

On 27 September 2010, Placebo released Battle for the Sun Redux Edition, which included the single version of "Bright Lights" and a bonus disc featuring several re-recorded old tracks and the new songs "Monster Truck" and "Trigger Happy Hands". The last shows of the Battle for the Sun tour took place in London's Brixton Academy on 27–28 September 2010.

The band was going to tour Spain, Portugal, Japan and South Korea, but the shows were canceled due to Molko's poor health. In August 2011, Placebo went on a mini-tour of two shows in Berlin and Stuttgart.

On 31 October 2011, the band released their second live video album, We Come in Pieces, documenting the live performance at the Brixton Academy on 28 September 2010. The DVD also featured a short movie, "Trigger Happy Hands", and a documentary, "Coming Up for Air", directed by Charlie Targett-Adams.

On 12 December 2011, Placebo released an iTunes exclusive live album, Live at Angkor Wat, which featured the semi-acoustic concert performed at Angkor Wat in 2008.

=== B3, Loud Like Love and Forrest's departure (2012–2015) ===
On 29 November 2011, Placebo announced they would be headlining the Sundance Film and Music Festival in April 2012. In January 2012 the band confirmed their participation at the Rock im Pott festival scheduled for 25 August 2012 at Arena AufSchalke, Germany, along with the Red Hot Chili Peppers. Bass player Stefan Olsdal also confirmed for Billboard that the band would return to the studio in 2012 to record the follow-up to Battle for the Sun.

From April to September 2012, Placebo toured Europe. In June and July 2012, Placebo also played exclusive concerts in Madrid, Paris, Rome, Zurich and Hamburg for the launch of the new Mercedes-Benz A-Class. The band canceled a concert during an Austrian festival due to Molko's health problems, leaving the stage after only one song.

In August 2012, Molko revealed on Italy's Rai Radio 2 that a new single titled "B3" would be released in September. A five-track EP titled B3 was released in October 2012. It was reissued on 10" vinyl for Record Store Day 2013.

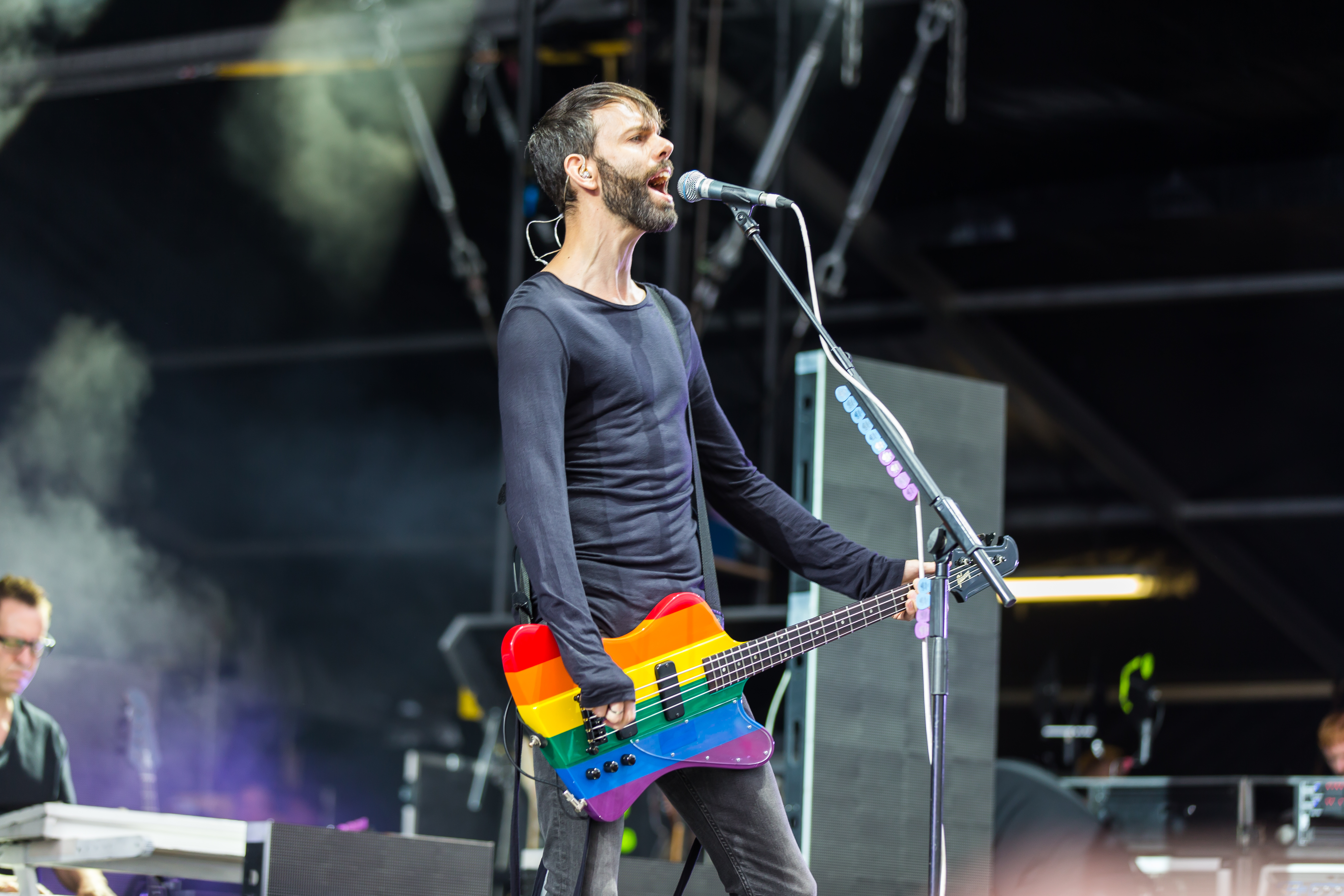
Stefan Olsdal performing in 2014, using a rainbow bass guitar; the rainbow is a well-known LGBT symbol.

During the Battle for the Sun tour, Molko and Olsdal both stated on various occasions that they were working on material for the next studio album.

On 21 May 2013, Placebo announced the release of their seventh studio album, Loud Like Love, and confirmed a tour of the United Kingdom in December. On 12 July, the band released a lyric video for the song "Too Many Friends", the first single on the new album, with the official music video being subsequently released in August and featuring author Bret Easton Ellis.

Produced by Adam Noble, the album was released on 16 September 2013 in five different formats. The same day, Placebo streamed live a 90-minute show, Loud Like Love TV, on their official YouTube channel. The show featured interviews with the band and their collaborators, live performances and behind the scenes content.

Brian Molko described the recording of the album as a positive experience, commenting:

...I see this record as a collection of 10 small fictions, based on my own experience and my own feelings around relationships over the past 20 years, I feel that I've been able to use the device [of] storytelling, which I think I've become a little bit more adept at, create songs with characters. Paradoxically, because of that, I've been able to be more honest, more direct and more personal.

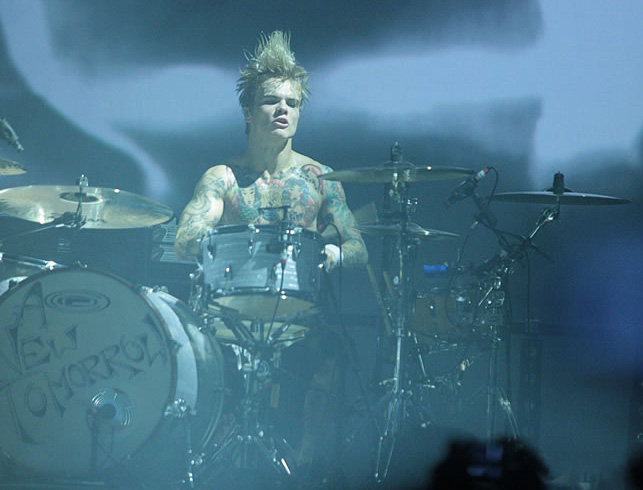
Steve Forrest, shown here during a concert with Placebo in 2009, left the band in 2015 to pursue his own musical career.

In November–December 2013, the band went on an arena tour in Europe and the United Kingdom to promote the new album. During February–April 2014 Placebo toured Australia, Mexico and South America. Beginning in June 2014, they went on a tour in Russia and Europe. In October 2014, they went on their first full tour of the United States and Canada in six years.

On 2 February 2015, the band announced the departure of drummer Steve Forrest. The end of Forrest's career with the band was "very amicable" and occurred due to the drummer's intention to "pursue his own musical ambitions". Placebo announced that for the planned 2015 gigs a new sideman, Matt Lunn, formerly of the bands Colour of Fire, who supported Placebo on tour in 2004, and Officers, who supported Placebo in 2009, would take the drummer's seat. Lunn continued to perform with Placebo during the A Place for Us to Dream tour.

On 12 February, Placebo announced that they would stream their entire back catalogue for the first time in their history.

In February–March 2015, Placebo toured Ireland and the United Kingdom, culminating with two shows in London's Hammersmith Apollo. During May–July 2015 they toured Europe, Morocco, Russia and Georgia. During the Morocco concert, bassist Stefan Olsdal, who is openly gay, appeared shirtless, having the number 489 crossed out on his torso, as a protest against Article 489 of the Moroccan Criminal Code, which punishes same-sex relationships with imprisonment. Olsdal also used a rainbow guitar on stage, the rainbow being a well-known LGBT symbol.

=== 20 Years of Placebo and A Place for Us to Dream (2015–2018) ===
Marking twenty years since the release of their debut album, Placebo announced in June 2015 the re-release of their first five albums on 12" coloured vinyl.

On 19 August 2015, Placebo performed an MTV Unplugged concert in London. The setlist for this performance consisted of many older Placebo songs, some of them not played live in a decade. On 27 November 2015, MTV Unplugged was released on CD, DVD, Blu-ray and vinyl.

In March 2016, Placebo announced the anniversary tour "A Place for Us to Dream – 20 Years of Placebo", with the first dates scheduled for December 2016 in the UK and Ireland. Molko stated that the setlist would include songs that he had sworn never to play again, adding: "This tour is very much for the fans and a chance for us to revisit a lot of our early material. So, if you want to see us play songs like 'Pure Morning' and 'Nancy Boy' which we haven't played in almost ten years and may not play again, then you'd better come along to these shows!"

Alt.Russia, a documentary containing scenes from the 2014 Placebo tour in Russia, was released on 10 May 2016. Narrated by Stefan Olsdal, the documentary was also a commentary towards the contemporary social and political issues in Russia, especially homophobia.

On 4 August 2016, Placebo announced the release of a compilation album, A Place for Us to Dream and of an EP, Life's What You Make It, collecting previously unreleased material. The compilation album and the EP were both released on 7 October 2016. Both contained the new single "Jesus' Son", which was released on 19 August 2016, accompanied by a music video.

On 7 October 2016, the band also released a video for the song "Every You Every Me", filmed in 1998 but never shown before to the public.

The band kicked off their 20 Years of Placebo tour in Aarhus, Denmark. The concert was abruptly cut short, however, already two songs into the set, as Molko became incoherent and had to be removed from the stage. An official statement from the band explained that Molko had an adverse reaction to new medication. The tour continued in the next evenings without incidents, the band receiving positive reviews for their performances. During October–November 2016, the band toured Europe and Russia. Placebo's December 2016 concerts in the UK and Ireland featured shoegaze supergroup Minor Victories as the opening act.

In March–April 2017, Placebo toured Mexico. During April–August 2017, they played a string of gigs across Europe, including appearances at Greece's Rockwave Festival and the UK's Latitude Festival. In September 2017, Placebo performed seven shows in Australia. In October 2017, they embarked on a tour of the UK, ending with two shows at the Brixton Academy on 23 and 24 October 2017.

Placebo have participated in the 2018 Meltdown Festival, held at Southbank Centre in June 2018. The festival was curated by long-time Placebo collaborator Robert Smith. In June and July 2018, the band also went on four dates in Italy, Ukraine and Switzerland.

=== Never Let Me Go (2019–present) ===
On 25 July 2019, Olsdal revealed that Placebo are working on their eighth studio album. In January 2020, Placebo announced a new tour, including festival shows during June–July 2020 in Greece, Spain, Belgium, Ukraine and Russia. In March 2020, Olsdal announced that he and Molko had to put finishing their eighth studio album on hold due to the COVID-19 pandemic, and London being on lockdown, via a post on his official Instagram. On 15 September 2020, Dave McLean, one of Placebo's managers at RIVERMAN, tweeted their eighth studio album would be released in early 2021. On 13 September 2021 an announcement was made that the band will release a new single titled "Beautiful James" on 17 September 2021.

On 4 November 2021, Placebo announced their eighth studio album, Never Let Me Go. It was released on 25 March 2022 on the indie label So Recordings. On 23 March 2022, Placebo embarked on the Never Let Me Go tour, starting with four intimate shows across Europe, followed by an extensive headline expedition, including, among other places, Germany, Denmark, Norway, Sweden, Finland, Estonia, Poland, Netherlands, Italy, Switzerland, Czech Republic, Austria, Luxembourg, Belgium, France, Ireland, the United Kingdom, and the United States.

On 7 September 2022, Placebo released a cover of the song "Shout" by Tears for Fears.

On 23 October 2024, a documentary directed by Oscar Sansom, This Search for Meaning, was released, containing tour footage from the Never Let Me Go tour and new interviews from Olsdal and Molko. The band will score the Royal Shakespeare Company's 2026 production The Resistible Rise of Arturo Ui, their first ever work for theatre.

Reissue of debut album (2026)

On 11 April 2026, the band announced a reissue, or "remake", of their debut album: Placebo RE:CREATED, released on June 19 of the same year. Simultaneously with the announcement, the single Bruise Pristine RE:CUT was released.

On 28 September 2026, Placebo released the single "Helen Keller", based on the melodic motif of the debut album's hidden track, "HK Farewell".

== Musical style, influences and lyrics ==
Placebo's music has typically been labeled as alternative rock. They have, however, also incorporated different sounds in their music throughout their career. Critics have also described the band's sound as pop punk, industrial rock, Britpop, glam rock, gothic rock, electronic rock, post-punk revival, and experimental rock. Progressive rock elements in the band's earlier works along with grunge and punk rock influences were also noted.

Placebo's influences include David Bowie, Can, Iggy Pop and the Stooges, Sonic Youth, the Cure, Pixies, Nirvana, the Smiths, PJ Harvey, Depeche Mode and Nine Inch Nails.

Lyrically, Placebo's music contains many references to drugs and sexuality. The title of the song "Special K", for instance, is slang for ketamine. Molko has been open about his use of recreational drugs: in a 1997 interview with Kerrang! magazine he admitted that heroin was "probably the only drug on this planet I haven't tried". However, he later admitted to using heroin as well. Pharmaceutical drugs are also referenced, as evidenced by the band's name as well as the album Meds and its title track. Molko admitted in 2003 that many of his initial excesses were due to his mental issues; he was officially diagnosed with major depressive disorder in his late twenties. The singer said in 2016 that he gave up drugs completely after the recording and release of Meds.

Outsider themes are also explored, as evidenced in lyrics such as "the back of the class is where I'm from" on "One of a Kind" and "I'm forever black-eyed/A product of a broken home" on "Black-Eyed". Molko has been quoted as calling the band "for outsiders, by outsiders".

=== Feud with Limp Bizkit ===
A feud between Limp Bizkit and Placebo began at a show frontman Fred Durst was hosting at Irving Plaza in December 1998. A side stage spat with Molko led to Durst asking the crowd to chant "Placebo sucks!" prior to Placebo's performance. Molko later commented that nobody had told him that Durst would be hosting the show and that Placebo would have to follow opening act Kid Rock. Prior to introducing Staind as a part of K-Rock’s Dysfunctional Family Picnic in Holmdel, New Jersey in 1999, Durst once again encouraged the crowd to chant "Fuck Placebo". The feud was reignited during Big Day Out 2001, on which Placebo were billed below Limp Bizkit after Hewitt acknowledged the animosity between both bands and claimed Limp Bizkit “was guilty of spreading negativity”. By 2004, the feud had reportedly ended.

== Awards and nominations ==
Year	Awards	Work	Category	Result	Ref.
1997	Kerrang! Awards	Themselves	Best New British Band	Won	
1997	NME Awards	Themselves	Best Band	Nominated	
1999	NME Awards	Themselves	Best Band	Nominated	
1999	NME Awards	Without You I'm Nothing	Best Album	Nominated	
1999	NME Awards	"You Don't Care About Us"	Best Single	Nominated	
1999	NME Awards	"Pure Morning"	Best Single	Nominated	
1999	Brit Awards	"Pure Morning"	Best British Video	Nominated	
2004	Hungarian Music Awards	Sleeping with Ghosts	Best Foreign Rock Album	Nominated	
2004	NRJ Music Awards	Sleeping with Ghosts	International Album of the Year	Nominated	
2004	NRJ Music Awards	Themselves	International Duo/Group of the Year	Nominated	
2004	Lunas del Auditorio	Themselves	Best Foreign Rock Artist	Nominated	
2006	Lunas del Auditorio	Themselves	Best Foreign Rock Artist	Nominated	
2006	Kerrang! Awards	Themselves	Classic Songwriter Award	Won	
2006	Kerrang! Awards	"Infra Red"	Best Single	Nominated	
2006	Los Premios MTV Latinoamérica	Themselves	Best Rock Artist – International	Nominated	
2007	ECHO Awards	Themselves	International Rock/Alternative Artist/Group of the Year	Nominated	
2007	Lunas del Auditorio	Themselves	Best Foreign Rock Artist	Nominated	
2009	Kerrang! Awards	Battle for the Sun	Best Album	Nominated	
2009	Kerrang! Awards	"For What It's Worth"	Best Single	Nominated	
2009	Kerrang! Awards	"For What It's Worth"	Best Video	Nominated	
2009	MTV EMA	Themselves	Best Alternative	Won	
2009	TMF Awards	Themselves	Best Rock International	Nominated	
2009	TMF Awards	Themselves	Best Live International	Nominated	
2010	UK Music Video Awards	"The Never-Ending Why"	The Innovation Award	Nominated	
2010	ECHO Awards	Themselves	International Rock/Alternative Artist/Group of the Year	Nominated	
2010	Lunas del Auditorio	Themselves	Best Foreign Rock Artist	Nominated	
2014	UK Music Video Awards	"Too Many Friends"	Best Alternative Video – UK	Nominated	
2014	ECHO Awards	Themselves	International Rock/Alternative Artist/Group of the Year	Nominated	
2015	Artist and Manager Awards	Themselves	Artists' Artist Award	Won	
2016	ECHO Awards	Themselves	International Rock/Alternative Artist/Group of the Year	Nominated	
2017	UK Music Video Awards	"Life's What You Make It"	Best Cinematography	Nominated	
2017	Ibiza Music Video Festival	"Life's What You Make It"	Best Colourist	Nominated	

=== Žebřík Music Awards ===
Year	Nominee / work	Award	Result	Ref.
2000	Black Market Music	Best International Album	Nominated	
2003	Sleeping with Ghosts	Best International Album	Won	
2003	Themselves	Best International Group	Nominated	
2003	Themselves	Best International Surprise	Nominated	
2003	Brian Molko	Best International Male	Nominated	
2003	Brian Molko	Best International Personality	Nominated	
2003	"The Bitter End"	Best International Song	Nominated	
2003	"Special Needs"	Best International Song	Nominated	
2003	"Special Needs"	Best International Video	Nominated	
2003	"This Picture"	Best International Video	Nominated	
2004	Themselves	Best International Group	Nominated	
2004	Themselves	Best International Surprise	Nominated	
2004	Brian Molko	Best International Male	Nominated	
2004	Brian Molko	Best International Personality	Nominated	
2004	"Twenty Years"	Best International Song	Nominated	
2004	"Twenty Years"	Best International Video	Nominated	
2006	Brian Molko	Best International Male	Nominated	
2006	Meds	Best International Album	Nominated	
2006	"Because I Want You"	Best International Song	Nominated	
2006	Themselves	Best International Group	Nominated	
2008	Themselves	Best International Group	Nominated	
2009	Themselves	Best International Group	Nominated	
2009	Brian Molko	Best International Male	Nominated	
2009	Battle for the Sun	Best International Album	Nominated	

== Legacy ==
Despite Placebo having great success throughout Europe among other regions, becoming one of the biggest alternative rock bands in the UK, Placebo has not had as much success in the U.S., with several of their albums, including Battle for the Sun and Loud Like Love reaching the Billboard 200. Despite this, Placebo have been cited as an influence on such bands as My Chemical Romance and Panic! at the Disco.

== Band members ==
=== Current members ===
Image	Name	Years active	Instruments	Release contributions
	(United Kingdom) / (United States) Brian Molko	1994–present	lead vocals; guitars; bass; keyboards; harmonica; saxophone; percussion	all releases
	(Sweden) Stefan Olsdal	1994–present	bass; guitars; keyboards; backing vocals	all releases

=== Current touring musicians ===
Image	Name	Years active	Instruments	Release contributions
	Bill Lloyd	1996; 1998–present	keyboards; bass; guitar (1996, 1998–2005)	Black Market Music (2000); Sleeping with Ghosts (2003) production; Once More with Feeling: Singles 1996–2004 (2004); Battle for the Sun (2009); MTV Unplugged (2015); Never Let Me Go (2022)
	Nick Gavrilovic	2008–present	guitar; lap steel guitar; keyboards; backing vocals	MTV Unplugged (2015); iTunes Live: London Festival '09 (2009)
	Matt Lunn	2015–present	drums; percussion	MTV Unplugged (2015); Never Let Me Go (2022)
	Angela Chan	2017–present	violin; keyboards; percussion; backing vocals	

=== Former members ===
Image	Name	Years active	Instruments	Release contributions
	(England) Steve Hewitt	1994; 1995; 1996–2007	drums; percussion	all releases from Without You I'm Nothing (1998) to Meds (2006); B-Sides: 1996–2006 (2011); A Place for Us to Dream (2016)
	(Sweden) Robert Schultzberg	1994–1995; 1995–1996	drums; percussion	Placebo (1996); A Place for Us to Dream (2016)
	(United States) Steve Forrest	2008–2015	drums; percussion; backing vocals	Battle for the Sun (2009); iTunes Live: London Festival '09 (2009); B3 (2012); Loud Like Love (2013); A Place for Us to Dream (2016)

=== Former touring musicians ===
Image	Name	Years active	Instruments	Release contributions
	(England) Xavior Roide	2003–2005	keyboards; backing vocals	none
	(England) Alex Lee	2006–2007	guitar; keyboards; backing vocals	none
	(England) Fiona Brice	2008–2017	violin; keyboards; theremin; percussion; backing vocals	Meds (2006); Battle for the Sun (2009); iTunes Live: London Festival '09 (2009); B3 (2012); Loud Like Love (2013); MTV Unplugged (2015)

== Discography ==
- Placebo (1996)
- Without You I'm Nothing (1998)
- Black Market Music (2000)
- Sleeping with Ghosts (2003)
- Meds (2006)
- Battle for the Sun (2009)
- Loud Like Love (2013)
- Never Let Me Go (2022)
