= Slave to the Wage =

Single by Placebo

from the album Black Market Music
- Released: 25 September 2000
- Genre: Alternative rock
- Label: Virgin
- Songwriters: Brian Molko; Stefan Olsdal; Steve Hewitt; Stephen Malkmus; Scott Kannberg
- Producers: Paul Corkett; Placebo

Placebo singles chronology
| "Taste in Men" (2000) | "Slave to the Wage" (2000) | "Special K" (2000) |

"Slave to the Wage" is a song by English alternative rock band Placebo. It was released as a single from their third studio album, 2000's Black Market Music. It reached number 19 in the UK Singles Chart. The song, inspired by the drudgery of having a "9 to 5" job in the modern world, is about not working oneself into an early grave. Bob Dylan's "Maggie's Farm" is also mentioned in the lyrics. The song samples the intro of "Texas Never Whispers" by Pavement.

The music video is directed by Howard Greenhalgh and was inspired by the movie Gattaca.

== Live performance history ==
The song was played throughout the Black Market Music and Sleeping With Ghosts tour, and was performed up until 2005. "Slave to the Wage" returned to the setlists on the band's summer 2012 tour. An acoustic version of the song is part of the 2015 MTV Unplugged performance.

== Track listings ==
CD1

1. "Slave to the Wage (Radio Edit)" – 3:50
2. "Leni" – 4:39
3. "Bubblegun" – 5:13

CD2

1. "Slave to the Wage (Album Version)" – 4:09
2. "Holocaust" – 4:26
3. "Slave to the Wage (Les Rythmes Digitales Remix)" – 4:29

== See also ==
- Wage slavery
