= Meds (song) =

Single by Placebo featuring Alison Mosshart

from the album Meds
- B-side: "UNEEDMEMORETHANINEEDU"
- Released: 9 October 2006
- Genre: Alternative rock
- Length: 2:55
- Label: Virgin
- Songwriters: Steve Hewitt; Brian Molko; Stefan Olsdal
- Producer: Dimitri Tikovoi

Placebo singles chronology
| "Infra-Red" (2006) | "Meds" (2006) | "Running Up that Hill" (2007) |

"Meds" is a song by English alternative rock band Placebo, released on 9 October 2006 as the fourth single from their fifth studio album Meds.

== Content ==
The song features vocals from Alison Mosshart of The Kills.

The cover art features a collage of the band members blurred faces. All three faces were featured individually on the previous three singles released for the album.

== Release ==
"Meds" was released on 9 October 2006 in both vinyl and CD format. The song was released to alternative rock radio airplay in the U.S. in late 2006. Its airplay increased gradually, so that by early January 2007, it was one of the 50 most-played songs on U.S. alternative radio. The single reached number 35 on the UK Singles Chart This marked their final appearance on the UK Top 40.

== Track listing ==
CD 1

1. "Meds (Single Mix)" (feat. Alison Mosshart)
2. "Lazarus"

CD 2

1. "Meds (Single Mix)"
2. "UNEEDMEMORETHANINEEDU"
3. "Space Monkey (Timo Maas Remix)"
4. "Meds" (video)

7" vinyl

1. "Meds (Single Mix)"
2. "UNEEDMEMORETHANINEEDU"

== Charts ==
| Chart (2006) | Peak position |
|---|---|
| UK Singles (Official Charts) | 35 |
