= Taste in Men =

Single by Placebo

from the album Black Market Music
- Released: July 2000
- Genre: Alternative rock; electronic rock
- Length: 4:15 (album version); 3:59 (video edit)
- Label: Virgin
- Songwriters: Steve Hewitt, Brian Molko and Stefan Olsdal
- Producers: Dare Mason; Paul Corkett; Placebo

Placebo singles chronology
"Burger Queen Francais" (1999)	"Taste in Men" (2000)	"Slave to the Wage" (2000)

Alternative cover

"Taste in Men" is a 2000 single by the English alternative rock band Placebo. Taken from their third album, Black Market Music, it reached number 16 in the UK singles chart.

== Music and reception ==
Gigwise ranked the track as Placebo's greatest hit, describing it as "bubbling, space-age blast of howling, claustrophobic electro-rock." Nevertheless, Pitchfork considered the song as a "lazy reprise the Roland 303 industrial funk of 'Pure Morning'."

According to frontman Brian Molko, the band was influenced by the industrial rock band Nine Inch Nails during the recording of the song, particularly by the track "Wish".

== Music video ==
The music video, directed by Barbara McDonogh, was filmed in the Central London Register office. It shows Molko involved in a love triangle with a couple who are fighting with each other. Montages of Molko with both the man and the woman are sequenced throughout the video. At the end, Molko is shown asleep in a room when the other two band members come in and wake him up.

== Live performance history ==
The song was a staple of the Black Market Music and Sleeping With Ghosts tours. Despite not appearing during the initial legs of the tour, it reappeared for the winter 2006 leg of the Meds tour and remained until the conclusion of the tour. It was the closing song for all shows on the Battle For The Sun tour. The song also appeared during the 2012 tour as the concluding song for all shows, but was dropped at the start of the Summer Festivals leg.

== Trivia ==
The phrase "come back to me awhile" is taken from the Sonic Youth song "Catholic Block", found on their album Sister.

The song was used in an episode from the United States version of Queer as Folk.

The bass riff is almost identical to Roger Waters' "Let There Be More Light" from the Pink Floyd album A Saucerful of Secrets.

== Track listings ==
CD1

1. Taste in Men (Radio edit) – 4:02
2. Theme from Funky Reverend – 2:54
3. Taste in Men (Alpinestars Kamikaze Skimix) – 4:36

CD2

1. Taste in Men (Album version) – 4:15
2. Johnny and Mary – 3:24
3. Taste in Men (Adrian Sherwood Go Go dub mix) – 4:19

== Charts ==
Chart performance for "Taste in Men"
Chart (2000)	Peak position
Australia (ARIA)	69
Belgium (Ultratip Bubbling Under Flanders)	8
France (SNEP)	54
Italy (FIMI)	11
Portugal (AFP)	7
UK Singles Chart	16
