= This Picture (song) =

Single by Placebo

from the album Sleeping with Ghosts
- Released: 9 June 2003
- Genre: Alternative rock
- Length: 3.34
- Label: Hut Recordings; Virgin Records
- Songwriter(s): Steve Hewitt; Brian Molko; Stefan Olsdal
- Producer(s): Jim Abbiss

Placebo singles chronology
"The Bitter End" (2003)	"This Picture" (2003)	"Special Needs" (2003)

"This Picture" is a single by British alternative rock band Placebo, from their fourth studio album, Sleeping with Ghosts, released on 9 June 2003. It was the second single off of the album.

"This Picture" was remixed by Junior Sanchez for the bonus remix CD of Once More with Feeling.

== Lyrics ==
It tells the story of a relationship involving sadomasochism and an abusive female in a position of dominance. In the lyrics, the phrase "ashtray girl" is meant to refer to a woman who uses her partner as an "emotional ashtray"; "cigarette burns on my chest" makes reference to a supposed particular fetish of James Dean. As singer/lyricist Brian Molko commented, prior to its performance at a concert,

There's an old story that somebody told me once about James Dean. For those of you who don't know this yet, James Dean was gay. Yes, I'm sorry, it's true. He had a particular fetish where he liked to have cigarettes stubbed out on his chest. That's kind of an image that's always stayed with me, and part of the inspiration for this song.

== Release ==
This Picture was released by Hut Recordings on 9 June 2003. Dale Price of Drowned in Sound regarded it as one of the best songs on Sleeping with Ghosts and compared it favourably to the band's earlier single "You Don't Care About Us". The single peaked at no. 23 in the UK Singles Chart.

== Music video ==
The music video features the Italian actress Asia Argento.

== Track listings ==
CD

No.	Title	Length
1.	"This Picture"
2.	"Soulmates"
3.	"Where Is My Mind?" (XFM Live Version)

Australian CD version

No.	Title	Writer(s)	Length
1.	"This Picture"		3:36
2.	"Soulmates"		3:23
3.	"Where Is My Mind?" (XFM Live Version)		3:56
4.	"Daddy Cool"	Boney M	3:21
5.	"Teenage Angst" (Piano Version)		3:34

7"

No.	Title	Length
1.	"This Picture"
2.	"Where Is My Mind?" (XFM Live Version)

DVD

- "This Picture" (video)
- Interview footage
- "This Picture" (acoustic version recorded by RTL2 France)
- "Jackie" – audio track

== Charts ==
Chart performance for "This Picture"
Chart (2003)	Peak position
Australia (ARIA)	52
Belgium (Ultratip Bubbling Under Wallonia)	16
France (SNEP)	63
Germany (GfK)	75
Italy (FIMI)	42
Scotland (OCC)	29
Spain (PROMUSICAE)	20
UK Singles (OCC)	23
