= Brian Molko =

Singer and musician (born 1972)

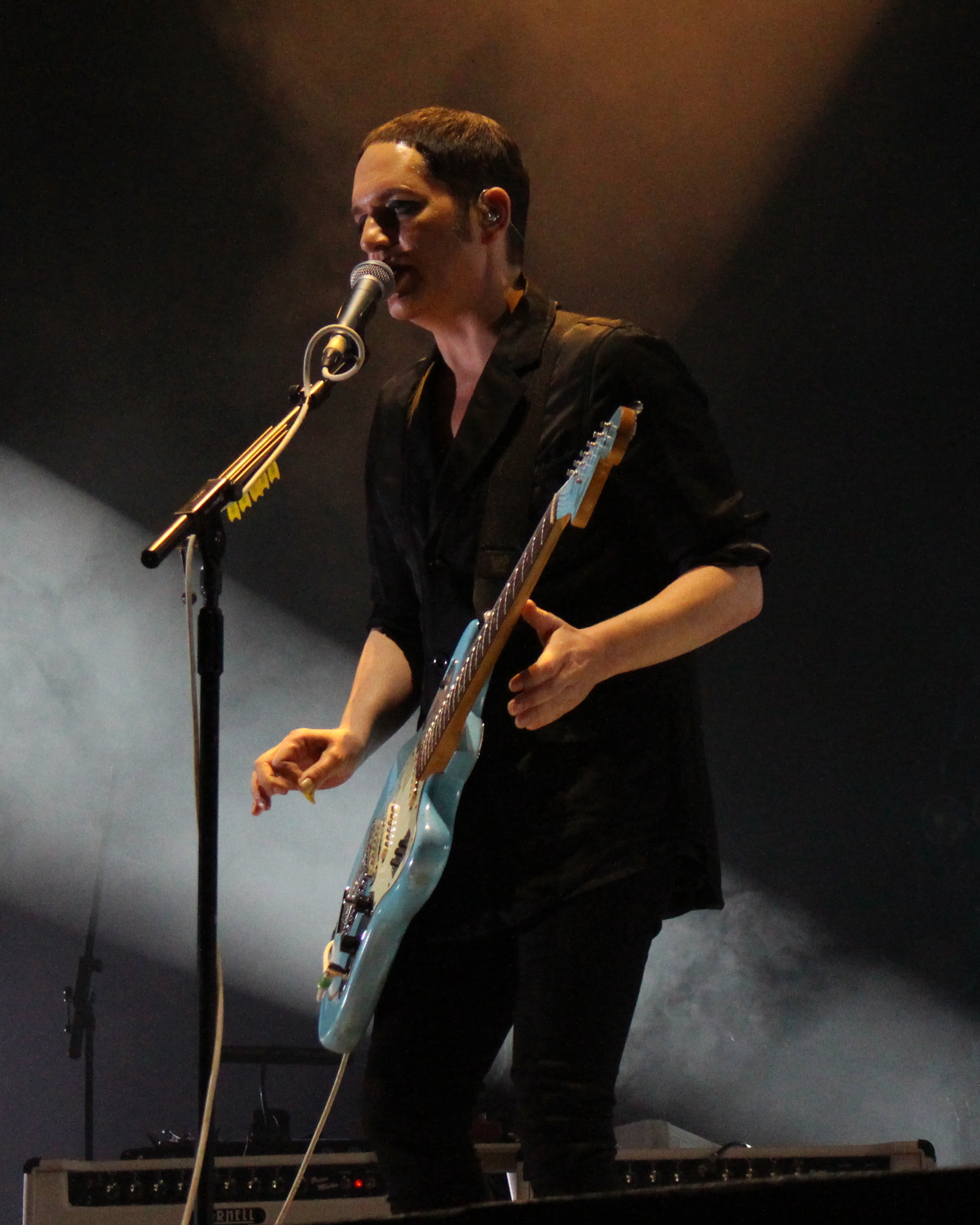
- Molko in 2017
- Born: 10 December 1972 (age 53); Brussels, Belgium
- Occupations: Singer; musician; songwriter
- Years active: 1992–present
- Children: 1
- Musical career
- Genres: Alternative rock; post-punk; glam punk; experimental rock
- Instruments: Vocals; guitar; keyboards; Harmonica
- Labels: EMI; Virgin; Hut; Caroline; PIAS
- Member of: Placebo
- Website: www.placeboworld.co.uk

Brian Molko (born 10 December 1972) is a British-American musician who is the lead vocalist, guitarist, and lyricist of the band Placebo. He is known for his nasal voice and high registered vocals, feminine/androgynous appearance, aggressive guitar style and non-standard tunings.

== Early life ==
Molko was born in Brussels, Belgium, to an American father of French and Italian heritage and a Scottish mother. He had an older brother named Stuart who died in August 2022 after a short illness. Molko's family moved frequently during his childhood due to his father's career as a banker; the family lived in Dundee in Scotland, Liberia, Lebanon, and the village of Longeau in Belgium, before eventually settling in the town of Sandweiler, in Luxembourg.

Although Molko was brought up in a strict household that disapproved of artistic expression (his father wanted him to become a banker), he rebelled by assuming an androgynous image, wearing nail polish, lipstick, and eyeliner, and listening to punk music.

Molko initially attended the European School of Luxembourg (ESL), but he left because he was bullied. He completed his secondary education at the American International School of Luxembourg (AISL), before studying drama at Goldsmiths College in London.

== Career ==
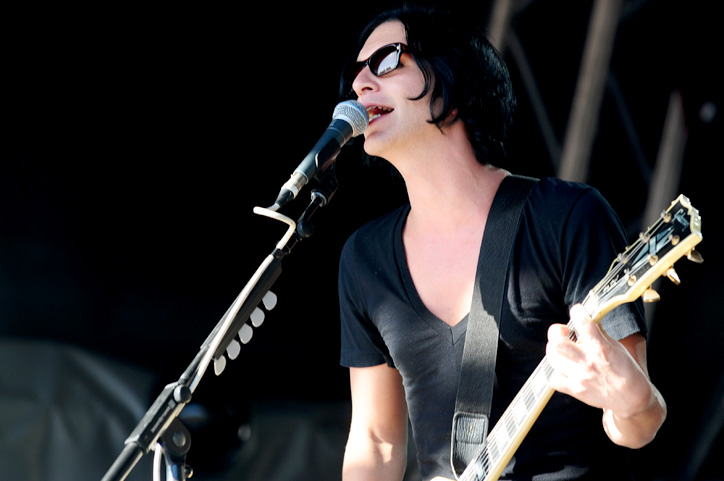
Soundwave Festival 2010

Although Molko and Placebo co-founder Stefan Olsdal had both attended the American International School of Luxembourg (AISL), they had not been friends. When Molko was living in London, he ran into Olsdal at South Kensington tube station and invited him to one of his gigs he played with Steve Hewitt in a group called Ashtray Heart.

Along with Hewitt and Olsdal, Molko had a role in the 1998 film Velvet Goldmine, for which Placebo performed the T. Rex song "20th Century Boy". He played Malcolm, a singer of the fictional glam rock band, "The Flaming Creatures", who resembled the early Alice Cooper band.

During Placebo's live performances Molko has played a number of instruments, including guitar, bass guitar, keyboards, harmonica and saxophone.

A selection of the lyrics Molko wrote throughout his career with Placebo was published as a book, "Selected", in 2014. The second edition was published in 2024.

== Personal life ==
Molko is bisexual, a theme that is reflected in some of his earlier lyrics with Placebo. He was previously in a relationship with Helena Berg, with whom he has a son, Cody Molko, who was born in 2005. Cody is now an actor, and appeared in the television series The Drowning.

Molko has been open about his use of recreational drugs: in a 1997 interview with Kerrang! magazine he admitted that heroin was "probably the only drug on this planet I haven't tried". However, he later admitted to using heroin as well. Pharmaceutical drugs are also referenced, as evidenced by the band's name as well as the album Meds and its title track. Molko admitted in 2003 that many of his initial excesses were due to his mental health issues; he was officially diagnosed with major depressive disorder in his late twenties. He claimed in 2016 that he gave up drugs completely after the recording and release of Meds.

Molko is bilingual in French and English.

In December 2012, he received an Honorary Fellowship from Goldsmiths College, University of London.

In March 2021, Molko was featured in the Marc Jacobs "Heaven" collection with a campaign shot taken by Harley Weir.

In August 2023, Prime Minister of Italy Giorgia Meloni sued Molko for defamation after he called her a "fascist racist" while performing at the Sonic Park Festival in Stupinigi in July. In February 2025, Molko was charged with defamation by prosecutors, following attempts by the Turin prosecutor to determine his domicile for administrative purposes in March 2024.

== Collaborations ==
He has performed, as a guest vocalist and with other artists on Placebo's records, on tracks by:

- The Cure – "If Only Tonight We Could Sleep" (live)
- Justin Warfield – "Spite & Malice"
- Losers – "Summertime Rolls"
- Asia Argento – "Je T'aime, Moi Non Plus" (Serge Gainsbourg and Jane Birkin cover)
- Alison Mosshart from The Kills – "Meds"
- Michael Stipe of R.E.M. – "Broken Promise"
- Faultline & Françoise Hardy – "Requiem for a Jerk" (Serge Gainsbourg cover)
- Timo Maas – "Pictures", "Like Siamese", "First Day", "College 84"
- Kristeen Young – "No Other God" on X
- Dream City Film Club – "Some", "Billy Chic"
- Jane Birkin – "Smile"
- David Bowie - cover of T. Rex's "20th Century Boy", "Without You I'm Nothing"
- AC Acoustics – "Crush"
- Alpinestars – "Carbon Kid"
- Trash Palace – "The Metric System"
- Hotel Persona – "Modern Kids"
- Indochine – "Pink Water 3"
- Prova Symphonica conducted by Michel Bisceglia – "Across the Universe" (The Beatles cover), "Ne me quitte pas" (Jacques Brel cover, both live)
- Westbam – "Sick"
- Fiona Brice – "West End Girls" (Pet Shop Boys cover)
- Trash Palace – "Can't Get You Out of My Head" (Kylie Minogue cover, live)
- Blackfield – "Under My Skin" (Sirens Remix)
- Tinlicker – "Nowhere to go"

Molko wrote the English lyrics to "Pink Water 3", a song by Indochine from the album Alice & June, released in 2005.

He was friends with David Bowie; Bowie sang on Placebo's "Without You I'm Nothing" and on the "20th Century Boy" cover live.

== Equipment ==
Molko uses a variety of guitars. In the Sleeping With Ghosts era, he used Gibson SGs ("The Bitter End", "Every You Every Me", "Plasticine", "Black-Eyed", "Without You I'm Nothing", "Special K", "Bulletproof Cupid", "Soulmates/Sleeping With Ghosts", "Special Needs", "This Picture"), Fender Jaguars ("Allergic", "Nancy Boy", "Bionic", "Centrefolds"), a Fender Thinline Telecaster ("Taste in Men"), a Fender Jazzmaster ("Pure Morning"), and a Fender Bass VI ("Slave to the Wage"). For amplification he used a Marshall 6100LM.

Through the Meds tour, he used Gretsch Duo Jets ("Infra-Red", "Because I Want You", "Song to Say Goodbye", "One of a Kind", "The Bitter End", "Running Up that Hill", "Special K"), Gibson SGs ("Special Needs", "Every You Every Me", "Black-Eyed", "Without You I'm Nothing"), a Fender Jaguar ("Drag", "Nancy Boy", "I Know"), a Fender Thinline Telecaster ("Twenty Years", "Taste in Men"), and a Gibson Chet Atkins SST ("Meds"). His amplifier was a Fender Twin Reverb.

In the Battle for the Sun tour, he still used Gretsch Duo Jets ("Devil in the Details", "Come Undone", "Follow The Cops Back Home"), a Gibson SG ("Bright Lights"), Fender Cyclone ("Ashtray Heart", "The Never-Ending Why", "Breathe Underwater", "Teenage Angst"), a Gibson Les Paul ("For What It's Worth", "Speak in Tongues", "Julien", "Meds"), a Fender Telecaster Thinline ("Kitty Litter"), and a Fender Toronado ("Battle for the Sun"). His pedalboard consisted of a Boss TU-2 chromatic tuner, Electro Harmonix Holy Grail reverb, MXR Phase 90 phaser, two Electro Harmonix Hot Tubes distortion units, Boss DD-3 delay, MXR Distortion + booster, MG Monovibe chorus/vibrato, Electro Harmonix No. 1 Echo delay and a Radial Loopbone effect chain switcher.

In 2010, he signed an endorsement contract to use Orange amps.

== Filmography ==
- Velvet Goldmine (1998) – Malcolm of The Flaming Creatures
- Sue's Last Ride (2001) – executive producer
