= The Bitter End (song) =

2003 single by Placebo

Single by Placebo

from the album Sleeping with Ghosts
- B-side: "Daddy Cool"; "Teenage Angst"; "Evalia"; "Drink You Pretty"
- Released: 10 March 2003
- Length: 3:10
- Label: Virgin; Hut
- Songwriters: Steve Hewitt; Brian Molko; Stefan Olsdal
- Producer: Jim Abbiss

Placebo singles chronology
"Black Eyed" (2001)	"The Bitter End" (2003)	"This Picture" (2004)

"The Bitter End" is a song by British alternative rock band Placebo. It was released as the lead single from their fourth studio album, Sleeping with Ghosts (2003), on 10 March 2003. "The Bitter End" and "Every You Every Me" are the two most often played songs in the Placebo's live shows.

== Critical response ==
Critics generally praised the single upon its release. Reviewing Sleeping with Ghosts, BBC.co.uk's rock/indie reviewer Dan Tallis described "The Bitter End" as "a good pop tune", having "just the right amount of dark, gothic atmosphere to please their fans and enough radio friendly guitars to please the new generation of indie kids." The Times thought the song "ramped up the energy level to devastating effect."

Rock Sound reasoned that the track's "kick ass romp" reinforces "their status as purveyors of pure indie pop in the vein of The Smiths." However, NME saw differing influences woven in the track, reporting that "The Bitter End" "sees Placebo powering along with a relentless U2- chasing-after-The Cure melody that's as infectious as 24."

Summarising Placebo's 2004 singles collection, Once More with Feeling, BBC.co.uk's Nottingham music reviewer Jaime Gill stated that "each song stems from a songwriter so instinctive and precise that when he writes a song called "The Bitter End", that's exactly what it sounds like."

== Music video ==
The music video sees the band playing in the dish of the Lovell Telescope, one of the largest radio telescopes. Halfway through the video, it displays an infrared image of a couple chasing after each other. They eventually catch each other up and kiss against a wall. Near the end of the video, the band is rained upon. It was filmed close to Stockport in Cheshire, England.

== Track listings ==
CD 1

No.	Title	Length
1.	"The Bitter End"
2.	"Daddy Cool"
3.	"Teenage Angst (Piano Version)"
4.	"The Bitter End" (video)

CD 2

No.	Title	Length
1.	"The Bitter End"
2.	"Evalia"
3.	"Drink You Pretty"

7-inch vinyl

No.	Title	Length
1.	"The Bitter End"
2.	"Daddy Cool"

== Formats ==
"The Bitter End" was released on 10 March 2003 via Elevator Music/Hut Records, the first single to be taken from the album Sleeping with Ghosts. Two CD singles offering differing B-sides were issued, as well as a single in 7-inch vinyl format. Later, "The Bitter End" saw inclusion on the November 2004 compilation Once More with Feeling: The Singles.

Format	Track number			
Format	1	2	3	4
The Bitter End
CD1 single (UK, Elevator Music)	B	D	T	BV
CD2 single (UK, Elevator Music)	B	E	DP	
7-inch single (UK, Elevator Music)	B	D		

Key

- B - "The Bitter End"
- D - "Daddy Cool"
- T - "Teenage Angst (piano version)"
- BV - "The Bitter End video"
- E - "Evalia"
- DP - "Drink You Pretty"

== Charts ==
Weekly chart performance for "The Bitter End"
Chart (2003)	Peak position
Australia (ARIA)	47
Belgium (Ultratip Bubbling Under Flanders)	15
Belgium (Ultratop 50 Wallonia)	39
Europe (Eurochart Hot 100)	35
Finland (Suomen virallinen lista)	19
France (SNEP)	31
Germany (GfK)	34
Greece (IFPI)	6
Hungary (Single Top 40)	9
Ireland (IRMA)	39
Italy (FIMI)	16
Netherlands (Single Top 100)	96
Portugal (AFP)	1
Scottish Singles Sales (Official Charts)	14
Spain (Promusicae)	19
Switzerland (Schweizer Hitparade)	53
UK Singles (Official Charts)	12
