= Room at the Top =

Room at the Top may refer to:

- Room at the Top (novel), a 1957 novel by John Braine
  - Room at the Top (1958 film), a film based on the novel
  - Room at the Top (2012 film), a television film based on the novel
- "Room at the Top" (Adam Ant song), 1990
- "Room at the Top" (Tom Petty and the Heartbreakers song), 1999
- "Room at the Top", a song by the Boo Radleys from Everything's Alright Forever
- Room at the Top, a 2002 album by the James Taylor Quartet
