= Giant Steps (The Boo Radleys album) =

Studio album by the Boo Radleys
- Released: 16 August 1993
- Recorded: February–March 1993
- Studios: First Protocol, London
- Genres: Britpop; shoegaze; psychedelic pop; country; dub; experimental pop
- Length: 64:11
- Label: Creation
- Producers: Martin Carr; Tim Brown; Andy Wilkinson

The Boo Radleys chronology
Learning to Walk (1992)	Giant Steps (1993)	Wake Up! (1995)

Singles from Giant Steps
- 1. "Lazarus" Released: 1992; 2. "I Hang Suspended" Released: 1993; 3. "Wish I Was Skinny" Released: 1993; 4. "Barney (...and Me)" Released: 1994; 5. "Lazarus (remixes)" Released: 1994

Giant Steps is the third album by the Boo Radleys, released on 16 August 1993. The title is inspired by John Coltrane's album Giant Steps, and the record features an assortment of influences—the band's previous shoegazing sound backed by pop, reggae, noise pop and orchestral sounds.

== Background ==
The Boo Radleys released their second album Everything's Alright Forever (1992) through Creation Records. It reached number 55 on the UK Albums Chart, and gave the band their first hit in that territory with "Does This Hurt", which peaked at number 67 on the Singles Chart. With frequent live performances, and attention from the press, the band's profile rose. Following a US tour with Sugar, the Boo Radleys began working on their next release.

Guitarist Martin Carr had wanted to make an album that was more musically ambitious than the shoegaze sound they were known for. He said the rest of the band felt that no other act on the Creation Records roster were as competent as them. Journalist David Cavanagh said the band used the studio as an instrument, "push[ing] back the boundaries" of music as Screamadelica (1991) by Primal Scream had previously done, "crashing from genre to genre" as if the Boo Radleys were making their own iteration of the White album (1968) by the Beatles.

== Release ==
Assistant press officer Andy Saunders was enamoured with the album. He and label co-founder Dick Green told marketing consultant Tim Abbot to "chuck everything at it" in terms of promotional efforts. While label co-founder Alan McGee liked "Lazarus", he thought the rest of it was too avant-garde. Carr was not worried by this response as McGee had taken some time to change his similar opinion on Everything's Alright Forever. "Lazarus" was released was the album's lead single in November 1992. McGee understood the change in the band's sound, but informed them the label would be focusing its efforts on Mezcal Head (1993) by labelmates Swervedriver, who had the chance of becoming bigger in the US. To help aid the album's promotion, Saunders wanted Carr to be perceived by the press as a musical genius akin to Brian Wilson of the Beach Boys or Kevin Shields from former Creation group My Bloody Valentine. Alongside this, the band performed at Sound City festival in Glasgow. "Lazarus" was gaining traction in the US, and subsequently, the Boo Radleys became a popular act during the 1994 Lollapalooza touring festival.

== Reception ==
Professional ratings
Review scores
Source	Rating
AllMusic	4.5/5 stars
Calgary Herald	B+
Encyclopedia of Popular Music	5/5 stars
Mojo	4/5 stars
Music Week	4/5 stars
NME	9/10
Pitchfork	8.7/10
Q	4/5 stars
Record Collector	4/5 stars
Select	4/5

Giant Steps received favourable reviews upon its release. It had sold 60,000 copies in 1993, becoming Creation Records' best selling release of the year. It reached the UK Top 20; "Lazarus" reached number 76 in the UK.

NME and Select named it as album of the year, and it was ranked as No. 1 in Fanning's Fab Fifty for that year. Reviewing the album's re-release in 2008, Sic Magazine wrote, "For 64 minutes they were the greatest band on the planet".

The album was also included in the book 1001 Albums You Must Hear Before You Die. Author Dave Thompson, in his book Alternative Rock (2000), praised the variety of styles, noting that "those perfect pop harmonies keep somersaulting overheard."

In 2016, Pitchfork ranked the album at number 25 in its list of "The 50 Best Shoegaze Albums of All Time", with critic Stephen Thomas Erlewine writing:

The Boo Radleys' songwriter/guitarist, Martin Carr, named his band's 1993 album after John Coltrane's 1959 LP, but Giant Steps also is a winking acknowledgment of another kind: He's the first to know that the Liverpool quartet has taken a huge leap forward. Although they hardly renounce the thunderous swirl and delicate suspension of 1992's Everything's Alright Forever, the Boo Radleys treat that candied rush as an absorbed language, with Carr choosing to pursue a grand vision that unifies psychedelia, British guitar-pop, jazz, and dub. Part of the appeal of Giant Steps is that the Boo Radleys' enthusiasm leads them to attempt fusions that would scare away other bands: Witness "Lazarus," which begins with an elastic reggae beat before becoming consumed by sheets of guitars, wispy harmonies, and stabs of brass. "Lazarus" is essentially Giant Steps in microcosm, but the album gains strength through its own untrammeled ambition. At the dawn of britpop, the Boo Radleys chose expanding consciousness over provincial patriotism, and the results are still majestic."

The following year, Pitchfork also ranked it at number 40 on its list of "The 50 Best Britpop Albums".

== Track listing ==
All songs and lyrics written by Martin Carr.

=== Original release ===
No.	Title	Length
1.	"I Hang Suspended"	3:57
2.	"Upon 9th and Fairchild"	4:50
3.	"Wish I Was Skinny"	3:37
4.	"Leaves and Sand"	4:25
5.	"Butterfly McQueen"	3:28
6.	"Rodney King (Song for Lenny Bruce)"	2:45
7.	"Thinking of Ways"	3:48
8.	"Barney (...and Me)"	4:42
9.	"Spun Around"	2:31
10.	"If You Want It, Take It"	2:47
11.	"Best Lose the Fear"	4:12
12.	"Take the Time Around"	4:07
13.	"Lazarus"	4:38
14.	"One Is For"	1:36
15.	"Run My Way Runway"	2:20
16.	"I've Lost the Reason"	5:17
17.	"The White Noise Revisited"	5:02
Total length:		64:14

=== 2010 expanded edition ===
CD1 – Giant Steps

CD2 – Bonus disc 1

1. "Lazy Day"
2. "Vegas"
3. "Feels Like Tomorrow"
4. "Whiplashed"
5. "Does This Hurt? - Edit"
6. "Boo! Forever"
7. "Buffalo Bill"
8. "Sunfly II (Walking With The Kings)"
9. "Rodney King (St Etienne Remix)"
10. "As Bound As Tomorrow"
11. "I Will Always Ask You Where You've Been Even Though I Know The Answer"
12. "Peachy Keen"
13. "Further"
14. "Crow Eye"
- 1 – 4 taken from the Adrenalin EP.
- 5 – 8 taken from the Boo! Forever EP.
- 9 – 11 taken from the "I Hang Suspended" single.
- 12 – 14 taken from the "Wish I Was Skinny" single.

CD3 – Bonus disc 2

1. "Tortoiseshell"
2. "Zoom"
3. "Cracked Lips, Homesick"
4. "At The Sound Of Speed"
5. "Let Me Be Your Faith"
6. "Petroleum"
7. "Lazarus (7" Version)"
8. "Lazarus (Acoustic)"
9. "(I Wanna Be) Touchdown Jesus"
10. "Lazarus (St Etienne Remix)"
11. "Lazarus (Secret Knowledge Remix)"
12. "Lazarus (Ultramarine Remix)"
13. "Lazarus (Augustus Pablo Remix)"
14. "Lazarus (12" Version)"
- 1 – 3 taken from the "Barney (…and Me)" single.
- 4 – 8 taken from the "Lazarus" single.
- 9 – 14 taken from the "Lazarus (Remixes)" single.

== Personnel ==
- Sice – vocals
- Rob Cieka – drums, percussion
- Tim Brown – bass guitar, keyboards
- Martin Carr – guitar, keyboards, vocals
- Steve Kitchen – trumpet, flugel horn
- Lindsay Johnston – cello
- Jackie Toy – clarinet, bass clarinet
- Meriel Barham – vocals on "Rodney King" and "One Is For"
- Chris Moore – trumpet on "Lazarus"
- Margaret Fiedler – cello on "Lazarus"
- Keith Cameron – vocals on "The White Noise Revisitied"
- Yvette Lacey – vocals on "The White Noise Revisitied"
- Moose – handclaps on "Wish I Was Skinny", vocals on "The White Noise Revisitied"
- Kle – vocals on "The White Noise Revisitied"
- Laurence – vocals on "The White Noise Revisitied"
- Nick Addison – vocals on "The White Noise Revisitied"
- Guy Fixsen – vocals on "The White Noise Revisitied"
- Russell – handclaps on "Wish I Was Skinny"
- BOO! Productions (Martin Carr, Tim Brown & Andy Wilkinson) – production, remixing on "Lazarus"
- Kevin & Barry – mastering (at Townhouse Studios)
- Andy Wilkinson – engineering
- Giles Hall – assistant engineering
- Anjali Dutt – mixing (at Battery Studios, London)
- Sarah Bedingham – assistance
- Alan Moulder – remixing on "Lazarus"
- Stephen A. Wood – sleeve art
- Designland Limited – layout
