= Man at the Top =

Man at the Top may refer to:

- Man at the Top (TV series), a 1970s British drama series
- Man at the Top (film), a 1973 film spun off from the TV series
- "Man at the Top" (song), a song by Bruce Springsteen
