= Vodi (disambiguation) =

Vodi is a village in Estonia.

Vodi may also refer to:

- The Vodi, novel by John Braine
- Seyi Vodi, Nigerian fashion businessman
