= Kenneth Haigh =

British actor (1931–2018)

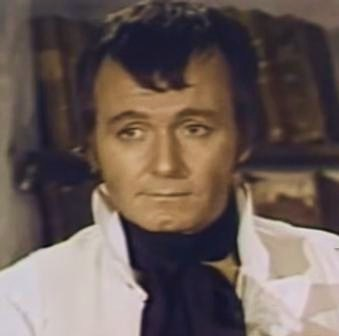
- Kenneth Haigh in Eagle in a Cage (1972)
- Born: Kenneth William Michael Haigh; 25 March 1931; Mexborough, West Riding of Yorkshire, England
- Died: 4 February 2018 (aged 86); London, England
- Education: Royal Central School of Speech and Drama
- Occupation: Actor
- Years active: 1956–2003
- Spouse: Myrna Haigh (m. 1974; div. 1985)

Kenneth William Michael Haigh (25 March 1931 – 4 February 2018) was an English actor. He first came to public recognition for playing the role of Jimmy Porter in the play Look Back in Anger in 1956 opposite Mary Ure in London's West End theatre. Haigh's performance in the role on stage was critically acclaimed as a prototype dramatic working-class anti-hero in post-Second World War English drama.

== Early life ==
Born in Mexborough, West Riding of Yorkshire, Haigh studied drama at the Central School of Speech and Drama, which at the time was based at the Royal Albert Hall in London.

== Career ==
He played the central role of Jimmy Porter in the premiere production of John Osborne's play Look Back in Anger in 1956 at the Royal Court Theatre. Haigh's performance in a 1958 Broadway theatre production of that play so moved one young woman in the audience that she mounted the stage and slapped him in mid-performance.

For the film version released in 1959, he was passed over in favour of Richard Burton. Haigh went on to portray the explorer and adventurer Richard Francis Burton in the BBC production of The Search for the Nile. He also briefly appeared in the Beatles' film A Hard Day's Night (1964), uncredited. His other major historical roles were as Brutus in Cleopatra and starring as Napoleon in Eagle in a Cage.

Later he portrayed Joe Lampton – a character created by John Braine in the novel Room at the Top – in the television series Man at the Top (1970–72) and its eponymous spin-off film (1973). Haigh also released an LP in 1973, titled How to Handle a Woman. That same year, in the role as Mr. Barnet in the Wessex Tales episode "Fellow Townsmen", Haigh portrayed a sufferer of fictional misfortune that would later echo his last years of his own life that imitated the tragic irony a Thomas Hardy story.

Haigh made occasional guest appearances on television; for some, the most recognisable is that of time-travelling Flight Lieutenant William Terrence Decker, in the Twilight Zone episode "The Last Flight" (1960). He had already played, three years earlier, another pilot, in High Flight, and had portrayed Pat Casey in Lionel Bart's Maggie May.

== Personal life ==
Haigh married the West Indies model Myrna Stephens in 1974. They divorced in 1985, but remained good friends; she nursed him through his final years of ill health.

== Death ==
Haigh died on 4 February 2018, aged 86. He had spent his last years in a nursing home after oxygen deprivation led to brain damage in 2003, following his accidental swallowing of a bone in a restaurant in Soho.

== Filmography ==
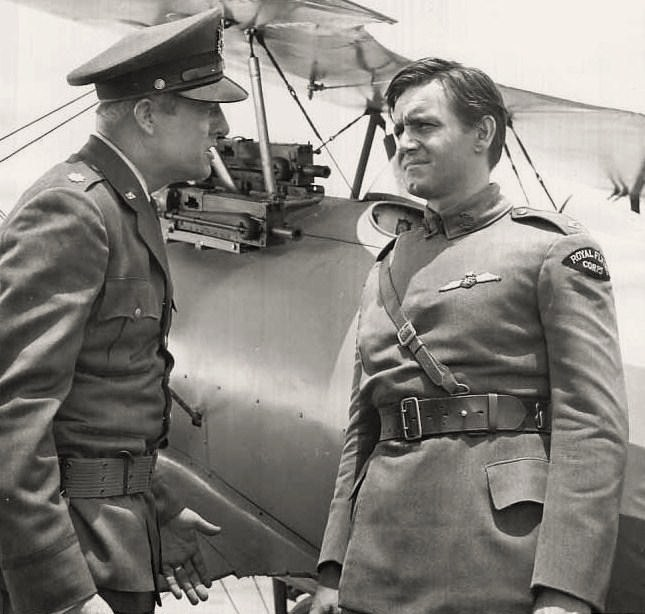
Haigh (right) and Simon Scott in The Twilight Zone episode "The Last Flight" (1960)

Year	Title	Role	Notes
1954	Companions in Crime	John Kendall	
1956	My Teenage Daughter	Tony Ward Black	
1957	Saint Joan	Brother Martin Ladvenu	
1957	High Flight	Anthony 'Tony' Winchester	
1960	The Twilight Zone, episode "The Last Flight"	Lieutenant Terrance Decker, RFC	
1963	Cleopatra	Brutus	
1964	A Hard Day's Night	Simon Marshall	Uncredited
1964	Weekend at Dunkirk	Atkins	
1967	The Deadly Affair	Bill Appleby	
1968	A Lovely Way to Die	Jonathan Fleming	
1971	Journey to Murder	Dirk Brogan	Example
1972	Eagle in a Cage	Napoleon Bonaparte	
1973	Man at the Top	Joe Lampton	
1976	Robin and Marian	Sir Ranulf	
1978	A Walk in the Sun	George	
1979	The Bitch	Arnold Rinstead	
1983	Night Train to Murder	Cousin Milton / Cousin Homer	
1985	Wild Geese II	Colonel Reed-Henry	
1986	A State of Emergency		
1991	Shuttlecock	Dr. Quinn	
2004	Mr. Blue	Mr. Blue	Short; Final film role

== Theatre ==
- Othello (Drogheda, 1952)
- The Archers Stage Play (Various, 1953)
- Dear Little Liz (Open Air, Regent's Park, 1955)
- Look Back in Anger (Royal Court, London, 1956) – Jimmy Porter
- The Mulberry Bush (1956) – Peter Lord
- The Crucible (1956) – Rev John Hale
- Cards of Identity (1956) – Beaufort
- Caligula (Broadway, 1960; Phoenix, London, 1964) – Caligula
- Zoo Story (Arts, London, 1961)
- Altona (Royal Court / Saville Theatre, London, 1961) – Franz von Gerlach
- The Collection (Aldwych, London, 1962)
- Playing with Fire (Aldwych, 1962)
- Julius Caesar (Stratford, RSC 1962) – Mark Antony
- Maggie May (Adelphi, London, 1964) – Patrick Casey
- Too Good To Be True (Edinburgh Festival, 1965) – Burglar
- Prometheus Unbound (Yale University Theatre, 1967) – Prometheus
- Henry IV (Yale, 1967)
- The Hotel in Amsterdam (Duke of York's Theatre, London, 1969) – Laurie
- Much Ado About Nothing (Manchester, 1969) – Benedick
- Equus (Citadel Theatre, Edmonton, Alberta, 1969–70) – Dysart
- Prometheus Unbound (Mermaid, London, 1971) – Prometheus
- Marching Song (Mermaid, 1974) – Rupert Foster
- The Father (Haymarket, Leicester, 1975) – Father
- California Suite (Eugene O’Neill Theatre, Broadway, 1977) – Replacement: William, Sidney, Stu
- The Aspern Papers (Chichester Festival, 1978)
- Twelfth Night (Stratford, CT, 1979) – Malvolio
- Julius Caesar (Stratford, CT, 1979) – Brutus
- The Tempest (Stratford, CT, 1979) – Prospero
- Clothes for a Summer Hotel (Broadway, 1980) – F Scott Fitzgerald
- Othello (Young Vic, London, 1982) – Othello

== Television ==
- The Life of Samuel Johnson, LL.D. (1957) – James Boswell
- Alfred Hitchcock Presents
  - Season 4 Episode 29: "Banquo's Chair" (1959) – John Bedford
  - Season 5 Episode 12: "Specialty of the House" (1959) – Mr. Costain
- Danger Man (1960) episode: "Josetta" – Juan
- Strange Report (1969) episode: "HOSTAGE — If You Won't Learn, Die!"
- Search for the Nile (1971)
- Man at the Top (Thames Television, 1971–73) – Joe Lampton
- Wessex Tales ("Fellow Townsmen") 1973 https://nostalgiacentral.com/television/tv-by-decade/tv-shows-1970s/wessex-tales/
- Moll Flanders (ITV, 1975) – Jemmy Earle
- Hazlitt in Love (1977) – William Hazlitt
- Maybury (BBC, 1981)
- Lady Killers (ITV, 1981) – George Joseph Smith
- The Testament of John (1984)
- The Fourth Floor (Thames Television, 1986) – George Payne
- The Blackheath Poisonings (1992) – Charles Russell
