= I Feel Nothing =

I Feel Nothing may refer to:

- "I Feel Nothing", a song by The Boo Radleys from their 1992 album Everything's Alright Forever
- "I Feel Nothing", a song by Ball Park Music from their 2020 self-titled album
