= Eight (Boo Radleys album) =

Studio album by The Boo Radleys
- Released: 9 June 2023
- Genre: Alternative rock
- Length: 49:16
- Language: English
- Label: BooSTR Records, Universal Music Group

The Boo Radleys chronology
Keep on with Falling (2022)	Eight (2023)	In Spite Of Everything (2026)

Eight is a 2023 studio album by British alternative rock band The Boo Radleys.

== Reception ==
Editors at AllMusic rated this album 4 out of 5 stars, with critic Fred Thomas writing that the band "sound rejuvenated and more excitable than ever" and this album "is energetic, inspired, and hits with one melodic hook after another, capturing the sound of a band overjoyed to be back and having the time of their lives". For Paste, Miranda Wollen scored this release a 7.6 out of 10, characterizing the work as "uncomplicated, comfortable and a grand tour of their quintessential, distinct style", writing that "the tracks are replete with brass, percussion and harmonics whose origins arise from the same hodgepodge of genres which made the Boo Radleys such a critical specimen in the first place" and "many of the songs sound a little silly, but in a fundamentally pleasurable way".

== Track listing ==
All songs written by Tim Brown, Rob Cieka, and Sice Rowbottom, except "Spaniard" and "Find The Answer Within" written by Martin Carr and "All Things Must Pass" written by George Harrison.

1. "Seeker" – 3:39
2. "The Unconscious" – 3:12
3. "Hollow" – 4:44
4. "Skeleton Woman" – 5:04
5. "Now That's What I Call Obscene" – 3:16
6. "Way I Am" – 4:31
7. "A Shadow Darker Than the Rest" – 2:54
8. "Wash Away That Feeling" – 3:20
9. "Sometimes I Sleep" – 3:18
10. "Sorrow (I Just Want to Be Free)" – 4:11
11. "Swift's Requiem" – 3:26
12. "Dust" – 3:39
13. "How Was I to Know" – 4:02

Deluxe Edition bonus disc

1. "Seeker" (Full Version) – 4:20
2. "Skeleton Woman" (Extended Version) – 7:11
3. "Sometimes I Sleep" (Alternative Version) – 3:09
4. "A Shadow Darker Than the Rest" (Piano Version) – 2:53
5. "The Hollow" (Alternative Version) – 4:43
6. "I Won't Be There with You" – 2:51
7. "That Ain't a Way of Life" – 3:43
8. "Now I Know" – 4:16
9. "All Things Must Pass" (Live at the Cavern, 2022) – 3:17
10. "Spaniard" (Live at the Cavern, 2022) – 3:45
11. "Find the Answer Within" (Live at the Cavern, 2022) – 3:36

== Charts ==
Chart performance for Eight
Chart (2023)	Peak
UK Independent Albums (OCC)	27

== Personnel ==
The Boo Radleys

- Simon "Sice" Rowbottom – vocals, guitar, keyboards
- Tim Brown – bass, guitar, keyboards, vocals
- Rob Cieka – drums, percussion, vocals

Additional personnel

- Nick Etwell – trumpet, flugelhorn

Additional personnel

- Tom Langrish – mastering

== See also ==
- List of 2023 albums
