= Neil Paterson (writer) =

Scottish author and screenplay writer (1915–1995)

- Born: James Edmund Neil Paterson; 31 December 1915; Greenock, Scotland
- Died: 19 April 1995 (aged 79); Crieff, Scotland
- Citizenship: British
- Education: University of Edinburgh
- Occupations: Novelist, short story writer, screenwriter, journalist, footballer
- Writing career
- Pen name: John Kovack
- Period: 1946–1990
- Notable work: Room at the Top (screenplay for 1959 film version)
- Notable awards: Academy Award for Best Adapted Screenplay; 1959 Room at the Top
Association football career
- Position: Inside left
Senior career*
Years	Team	Apps	(Gls)
- Edinburgh University
- Buckie Thistle
- Leith Athletic
1936–1937	Dundee United	26	(9)
- * Club domestic league appearances and goals

James Edmund Neil Paterson (31 December 1915 – 19 April 1995) was a Scottish writer of novels, short stories and screenplays. He won the 1959 Academy Award for Best Adapted Screenplay for Room at the Top. Before his success as a writer, he worked in journalism and had a brief career as an amateur footballer, playing for Buckie Thistle, Leith Athletic and Dundee United in the Scottish Football League.

== Early life and football career ==
Born in Greenock, Renfrewshire (now part of Inverclyde), Paterson was the older of two children of James D Paterson (1880–1947) and Nicholas K Kerr (1892–1956). He graduated from the University of Edinburgh and had a brief career in senior football, playing as an inside left. He played for Edinburgh University, for Buckie Thistle in the Highland League and for Scottish League teams Leith Athletic and Dundee United, becoming captain of the latter in the 1936–37 season. Despite his success in football – he scored 9 goals from 26 league appearances for Dundee United, including a hat-trick – he remained an amateur player, spurning the opportunity to go professional. As an amateur he was automatically released at the end of the season, although he played one further game for the club in an emergency.

== Writing career and later life ==
After his football career finished he became a writer, initially as a sports journalist for D.C. Thomson and after the Second World War as an author, penning a number of well received novels and short stories. Paterson won the Atlantic Award for Literature in 1946.

He adapted his own short story The Kidnappers for a cinema version released in 1953 and directed by Philip Leacock. (Note: The film was released as The Little Kidnappers in the United States.) Subsequently, he wrote a number of other screenplays, including The Woman for Joe, two more collaborations with Phillip Leacock and the first screen version of John Braine's novel Room at the Top (1959) which later won the Academy Award for Best Adapted Screenplay. Paterson served as a governor for the British Film Institute, National Film School and the Arts Council of Great Britain and as an executive for Grampian Television.

He died in 1995 at Crieff, Tayside (now part of Perth and Kinross).

== Selected bibliography ==
- On my Faithless Arm (1946) (Under pseudonym John Kovack)
- The China Run: Being the biography of a great-grandmother (1948)
- Behold Thy Daughter (1950)
- And Delilah: Nine stories (1951)
- The China Run: A book of short stories (1951)
- Man on the Tightrope (1952)
- Man on a Tightrope: The Short Novel (1953)
- The Kidnappers and other Stories (1957)
- Something like a poem (1986)

== Selected filmography ==
- The Kidnappers (US: The Little Kidnappers, 1953)
- Man on a Tightrope (1953)
- Devil on Horseback (1954)
- The Woman for Joe (1955)
- High Tide at Noon (1957)
- The Shiralee (1957)
- Innocent Sinners (1958)
- Room at the Top (1959)
- The Spiral Road (1962)
