= Learning to Walk (The Boo Radleys album) =

1992 compilation album by the Boo Radleys

Compilation album by The Boo Radleys
- Released: 1992 (UK)
- Recorded: 1990–1991
- Genres: Dream pop; shoegaze
- Length: 58:33
- Label: Rough Trade TPLP375CD (UK)
- Producers: 1-4 Rudi & The Boo Radleys, 5-8 & 10-13 Alan Moulder & The Boo Radleys, 9 Mike Robinson, 14 Dale Griffin

The Boo Radleys chronology
Everything's Alright Forever (1992)	Learning to Walk (1992)	Giant Steps (1993)

Professional ratings
Review scores
Source	Rating
Allmusic	4.5/5 stars
Trouser Press	(favorable)

Learning to Walk is a compilation album by UK indie band The Boo Radleys, released by Rough Trade Records in 1992.

It is a collection of the band's first three EPs, Kaleidoscope (1990), Every Heaven (1991) and Boo! Up (1991), as well as two previously unreleased covers, "Alone Again Or" and "Boo! Faith". The band's 1992 EP Adrenalin is not represented, as it was released on a separate record label.

The covers of "Alone Again Or" (originally by Love) and "Boo! Faith" (New Order's "True Faith", retitled) are taken from the band's second and third Peel Sessions, from 1991.

== Track listing ==
All tracks written by Martin Carr, except track 9 by Carr and Bryan MacLean and track 14 by The Boo Radleys and New Order.

1. "Kaleidoscope" (EP version)
2. "How I Feel"
3. "Aldous"
4. "Swansong"
5. "The Finest Kiss"
6. "Tortoiseshell"
7. "Bluebird"
8. "Naomi"
9. "Alone Again Or"
10. "Everybird"
11. "Sometime Soon She Said"
12. "Foster's Van"
13. "Song for Up!"
14. "Boo! Faith"

Notes

- Tracks 1–4 from the Kaleidoscope EP
- Tracks 5–8 from the Every Heaven EP
- Track 9 from a Peel Session first broadcast April 1991
- Tracks 10–13 from the Boo Up! EP
- Track 14 from a Peel Session first broadcast October 1991
