= Stay with Me Till Morning (TV series) =

- Genre: Drama
- Based on: Stay with Me Till Morning by John Braine
- Directed by: David Reynolds
- Starring: Nanette Newman; Keith Barron
- Country of origin: United Kingdom
- Original language: English
- No. of series: 1
- No. of episodes: 3

Production
- Producers: David Cunliffe; Michael Glynn
- Running time: 60 minutes
- Production company: Yorkshire Television

Original release
- Network: ITV
- Release: 28 August – 10 September 1981

Stay with Me Till Morning is a British television series that was originally broadcast on ITV in 1981. It is based on the 1970 novel of the same title by John Braine.

== Cast ==
- Paul Daneman as Clive Lendrick
- Nanette Newman as Robin Lendrick
- Alison Elliott as Petronella Lendrick
- Peggy Aitchison as Joan Walker
- Kate Coleridge as Vicky Kelvedon
- Peter Laird as Bruce Kelvedon
- Keith Barron as Stephen Belgard
- Michael Lees as Donald Lendrick
- Simon Fisher-Turner as Harold Thomas
- Lois Baxter as Ruth Inglewood
- Bill Wallis as Norman Radstock
- Natalie Ogle as Olive Villendam
- Richard Beale as Jesse Thomas
- Frances Cox as Hilda Thomas
- Malcolm Raeburn as Malcolm Fylde
- Jill Summers as Waitress
- Paula Tilbrook as Fiona Lendrick

== Bibliography ==
- Baskin, Ellen. Serials on British Television, 1950-1994. Scolar Press, 1996.
