= C'mon Kids =

Studio album by the Boo Radleys
- Released: 9 September 1996
- Recorded: January–February 1996
- Studios: Rockfield, Wales
- Genres: Art rock; psychedelic rock; progressive rock; Britpop; experimental pop
- Length: 52:39
- Label: Creation
- Producer: The Boo Radleys

The Boo Radleys chronology
Wake Up! (1995)	C'mon Kids (1996)	Kingsize (1998)

Singles from C'mon Kids
- 1. "What's in the Box (See Whatcha Got)" Released: 1996; 2. "C'mon Kids" Released: 1996; 3. "Ride the Tiger" Released: 1997

C'mon Kids is the fifth album by the Boo Radleys, released in September 1996. The album is considered to be purposely difficult and uncommercial. The band were said to have wanted to distance themselves from the commercial image they had cultivated because of the unexpected successes of the album Wake Up! and their top ten hit single "Wake Up Boo!". However, this was not the intention of the band, as explained by Sice in an interview in 2005:

We didn't want to scare away the hit-kids, we wanted to take them with us to somewhere that we'd not been before. All we wanted to do was make a different type of album than Wake Up... All we wanted to do was try something new – to keep ourselves fresh and interested. We were very surprised to find that it was seen as a deliberate attempt to scare away newly created fans. That would have been an extremely foolish thing to do.

— Sice

== Background and production ==
The Boo Radleys released their fourth studio album Wake Up! in early 1995. It topped the UK Albums Chart while its single "Wake Up Boo!" peaked at number nine on the UK Singles Chart. Two of its other singles, "Find the Answer Within" and "It's Lulu", alongside the non-album single "From the Bench at Belvidere", peaked with the top of the single chart. These helped to buoy the album's profile in mainland Europe, while the US release of it did not fare as well, with the band being dropped from Columbia Records. "To promote it, the band supported Blur for a one-off show at the Mile End Stadium in London, and appeared at the Glastonbury and Reading Festivals.

C'mon Kids was recorded at Rockfield Studios in Wales in January and February 1996, with the band acting as producers. Andy Wilkinson stood in as engineer, with assistance from Paul Reed. Sean Slade and Paul Kolderie mixed the album at Fort Apache Studios in Cambridge, Massachusetts, in March 1996. Guitarist Martin Carr was adamant that C'mon Kids was intended to alienate new fans.

== Promotion ==
Creation Records marketing manager John Andrews thought it would be an attempt at prolonging the band's lifespan; guitarist Martin Carr was optimistic that the album would be a popular seller, though it might take repeated listens to sink in. Andy Saunders, who had been re-hired as the band's publicist after previously being fired, was less hopeful for the album. Mark Sutherland, the features editor for NME, told Saunders that there was only a single way to approach the album from a journalistic standpoint: "'They were a pop band who had success and now they're not. That's the only story that any decent journalist is going to write about this album.' It died on its arse."

Though it lacked a song similar to "Wake Up Boo!" to boost sales, "What's in the Box?" was playlisted for BBC Radio 1 and promptly championed by radio presenter Simon Mayo. In preparation for a tour of the UK, the band learned that Creation Records had vetoed several of their proposals, such as declining support from DJ Propellerheads, who were intended to give the shows a Screamadelica-type atmosphere, for monetary reasons. Carr explained that while the members individually had some money, the band as a whole was lacking in funds. As a result, they decided to support other acts, such as Suede for their European tour in October 1996. C'mon Kids was issued in the US in March 1998.

== Reception ==
Professional ratings
Review scores
Source	Rating
AllMusic	3.5/5 stars
Alternative Press	5/5
Drowned in Sound	10/10
The Encyclopedia of Popular Music	4/5 stars
Entertainment Weekly	A−
The Guardian	3/5 stars
NME	9/10
Wall of Sound	80/100

Reviewing it at the time, James Oldham of the NME give it 9 out of 10, saying that it was "defiantly strange pop music" and "isn't madness, it's genius."

The album was less commercially successful than its predecessor, charting at No. 20 on the UK albums chart. It did however spawn three UK top 40 singles, "What's In The Box? (See Whatcha Got)" at No. 25, "C'mon Kids" at No. 18 (their second and last UK top 20 single), and a radio edit of "Ride The Tiger" (shortened by over three minutes from the album version) made No. 38. Journalist David Cavanagh wrote that they "lost 100,000 fans" with the album, and "returned to being a cult band".

In his book Turn on Your Mind: Four Decades of Great Psychedelic Rock, writer Jim DeRogatis ranked C'Mon Kids at number 110 in his list "The Ultimate Psychedelic Rock Library: One-Hundred Eighty-Nine Albums You Can't Live Without." Music journalist Mark Beaumont said the album "deserved the edict of 'post Britpop classic'", while Cavanagh referred to it as "harsh and uncompromising". Author Dave Thompson, in his book Alternative Rock (2000), wrote: "Transitionally awkward, the Boos' new direction turns out to be less a cul-de-sac than a suicide note."

C'mon Kids is the all-time favourite album of Tom White of The Electric Soft Parade, a band influenced by the album. According to Martin Sainsbury of Drowned in Sound, Nicky Wire of Manic Street Preachers also listened to "little else for a year," whereas Radiohead "went back to the drawing board when hearing it during the OK Computer sessions."

== Track listing ==
All songs written by Martin Carr.

No.	Title	Length
1.	"C'mon Kids"	4:10
2.	"Meltin's Worm"	4:19
3.	"Melodies for the Deaf (Colours for the Blind)"	3:45
4.	"Get on the Bus"	3:13
5.	"Everything Is Sorrow"	4:38
6.	"Bullfrog Green"	4:41
7.	"What's in the Box? (See Whatcha Got)"	3:30
8.	"Four Saints"	4:26
9.	"New Brighton Promenade"	3:06
10.	"Fortunate Sons"	3:58
11.	"Shelter"	2:01
12.	"Ride the Tiger"	6:38
13.	"One Last Hurrah"	4:20

Early vinyl copies came with a free 7" single featuring the tracks "Skywalker" and "French Canadian Bean Soup".

2010 reissue CD2

No.	Title	Length
1.	"Bloke in a Dress"	2:41
2.	"Flakes"	1:53
3.	"What's in the Box? (See Whatcha Got)" (Kris's Erupting Cricket Box Mix)	7:37
4.	"Atlantic"	3:09
5.	"The Absent Boy"	2:01
6.	"Annie & Marnie"	3:26
7.	"Spion Kop"	2:02
8.	"To Beautiful"	1:42
9.	"Bullfrog Green" (Ultra Living Remix)	4:57
10.	"Nothing to Do But Scare Myself"	3:06
11.	"From the Bench at Belvidere" (Ultramarine Remix)	6:38
12.	"Fortunate Sons" (Greg Hunter Remix)	4:02
13.	"Vote You"	2:35
14.	"A Part I Know So Well"	2:24
15.	"Everything is Sorrow" (Grantby Remix)	6:50
16.	"Roadie"	3:05
17.	"Safe at Home"	2:17
18.	"C'mon Kids" (Mekon Remix)	2:35

- Tracks 1–6 from the "What's in the Box? (See Whatcha Got)" single
- Tracks 7–12 from the "C'mon Kids" single
- Tracks 13–18 from the "Ride the Tiger" single

== Personnel ==
Personnel per booklet.

The Boo Radleys

- Sice – vocals
- Rob Cieka – drums
- Tim Brown – bass
- Martin Carr – guitar

Production and design

- The Boo Radleys – producer
- Andy Wilkinson – engineer
- Paul Read – assistant
- Sean Slade – mixing
- Paul Kolderie – mixing
- Tom Sheehan – photography
- Steve Gullick – photography
- Roger Sargent – photography
- Lollinger – outer artwork
- Toby Egelnick – design, layout
