= The Crying Game (disambiguation) =

The Crying Game is a 1992 film written and directed by Neil Jordan.

The Crying Game can also refer to:

- The Crying Game (novel), a 1968 novel by John Braine
- "The Crying Game" (song), a 1964 song by Geoff Stephens
- "Cryin' Game", a 1998 song by Sara Evans
- Nakige, or "crying game", a subgenre of visual novels
