= Ichabod and I =

Studio album by The Boo Radleys
- Released: July 1990
- Recorded: March 1990
- Genres: Noise pop, shoegaze
- Length: 28:55
- Label: Action
- Producer: Self-produced

The Boo Radleys chronology
Ichabod and I (1990)	Everything's Alright Forever (1992)

Professional ratings
Review scores
Source	Rating
AllMusic	2.5/5 stars
Trouser Press	(mixed)

Ichabod and I is the debut album by British indie rock band the Boo Radleys, released in 1990 on the indie label Action Records. It has never been released on CD. Steve Hewitt, the drummer for this album, would later join Placebo.

== Background ==
The Boo Radleys formed in Liverpool in 1988 between childhood friends Simon "Sice" Rowbottom, who sang and played guitar, and Martin Carr, a guitarist. Schoolfriend Tim Brown joined on bass; after various other individuals, Steve Hewitt became the drummer. They made their live debut at the Victoria bar in New Brighton, Merseyside, and in the following year, made a five-track demo. Mark Waring, a friend of the band, was in Dandelion Adventure, who had signed to the Preston-based label Action Records. Waring subsequently gave a tape of the Boo Radleys' demo to the label.

Author Dave Thompson, in his book Alternative Rock (2000), wrote that its title was "steeped in American literary lore, but otherwise [its music was] echoing the distinctly English sounds of My Bloody Valentine and Ride," both prominent acts of the British shoegaze scene.

== Track listing ==
All tracks are written by Martin Carr.

No.	Title	Length
1.	"Eleanor Everything"	3:27
2.	"Bodenheim Jr."	2:20
3.	"Catweazle"	3:26
4.	"Sweet Salad Birth"	4:42
5.	"Hip Clown Rag"	2:28
6.	"Walking 5th Carnival"	4:32
7.	"Kaleidoscope"	4:30
8.	"Happens to Us All"	3:00
Total length:		28:55

== Personnel ==
The Boo Radleys

- Sice – vocals
- Steve Hewitt – drums, percussion
- Tim Brown – bass guitar, keyboards
- Martin Carr – guitar, keyboards, vocals
