= Life at the Top (film) =

1965 British film by Ted Kotcheff

- Original film poster
- Directed by: Ted Kotcheff
- Screenplay by: Mordecai Richler
- Based on: Life at the Top; 1962 novel by John Braine
- Produced by: James Woolf
- Starring: Laurence Harvey; Jean Simmons; Honor Blackman; Michael Craig; Donald Wolfit
- Cinematography: Oswald Morris
- Edited by: Derek York
- Music by: Richard Addinsell
- Distributed by: Columbia Pictures
- Release date: 14 December 1965 (U.S.)
- Running time: 117 min
- Country: United Kingdom
- Language: English

Life at the Top is a 1965 British drama film, a production of Romulus Films released by Columbia Pictures. The screenplay was by Mordecai Richler, based on the 1962 novel Life at the Top by John Braine, and is a sequel to the film Room at the Top (1959). It was directed by Ted Kotcheff and produced by James Woolf, with William Kirby as associate producer. The music score was by Richard Addinsell and the cinematography by Oswald Morris. The film's art director, Edward Marshall, received a 1966 BAFTA Award nomination.

The film stars Laurence Harvey, once again playing Joe Lampton, with Jean Simmons, Honor Blackman and Michael Craig. Four actors reprised their roles from Room at the Top: Harvey, Donald Wolfit, Ambrosine Phillpotts and Allan Cuthbertson.

== Plot ==
Joe's father-in-law, Abe Brown, is the mayor of the town, and mill owner (Illingworths, Thornton Rd, Bradford). To Joe's disapproval, Abe insists on sending Joe's children to a private boarding school. Joe's son is also unhappy about this and when Joe invites the paper-boy in for a cup of tea, his son looks jealously on.

Joe reluctantly goes to a sherry party with his wife, Susan. The party is at Abe's house, an enormous estate. There he meets the beautiful blonde Norah.

Joe and his family say goodbye to his son at the railway station. Later that night, Abe and Susan, in front of Joe, choose which carpet will be in Joe's house. This humiliates Joe because her father can easily afford to pay for it.

Joe is sexually bored with Susan which leads her to begin an affair with Joe's married friend.

Joe goes to the Savoy Hotel in London with his friend for lunch with Tiffield. After Tiffield leaves they go to a strip show and the friend discusses dodgy business deals.

Joe meets with George Aisgill and they discuss how Joe caused the death of his wife. But Joe has a new love: Norah.

Joe goes home wearing a Huckleberry Hound mask and finds signs of another man being in the house. He hears Susan and the other man in their bedroom but does not enter. He is sitting downstairs when they come down for a drink. The three quarrel and Susan's lover leaves.

Joe separates from his wife and family and quits his job in order to live away with Norah and begin a new life with her. Because of his lack of credentials (he ascended his way up the corporate ladder because of his wife's father, powerful Abe Brown), he is unable to secure employment on his own. This causes resentment for Norah, whom Joe accuses her and her friends as being just like the class-conscious snobs he finds so repulsive.

Susan visits Joe in his flat, who is depressed about how his greed has wrecked his life. Susan tells Joe the kids miss him, as does she. Susan convinces Joe for the two of them to try again.

Because of Brown's age and ill health, he appoints Joe to take his place at the firm, regaining his "life at the top."

== Cast ==
- Laurence Harvey as Joe Lampton
- Jean Simmons as Susan Lampton
- Honor Blackman as Norah Hauxley
- Michael Craig as Mark
- Donald Wolfit as Abe Brown
- Robert Morley as Tiffield
- Margaret Johnston as Sybil
- Ambrosine Phillpotts as Mrs. Brown
- Allan Cuthbertson as George Aisgill
- Paul A. Martin as Harry
- Frances Cosslett as Barbara
- Ian Shand as Hethersett
- George A. Cooper as Graffham
- Nigel Davenport as Mottram
- Andrew Laurence as McLelland
- Geoffrey Bayldon as Industrial Psychologist
- Denis Quilley as Ben
- David Oxley as Tim
- David McKail as Oscar
- Paul Whitsun-Jones as Keatley
- Charles Lamb as Wincastle
- Richard Leech as Doctor
- Rex Deering as Lord Mayor
- Harry Fowler as Magic Beans Man
- Lola Morice as Mrs. Keatley
- Philip Stone as Tiffield Interview Panelist #3 (uncredited)
- Edward Fox as Tamill (uncredited)

== Background ==
In Room at the Top, Joe Lampton's escape from his working-class background through his seduction of, and marriage to, the daughter of a wealthy mill owner had been portrayed. Ten years on, Joe is living the dream of the successful young executive, complete with luxurious suburban house, white S-type Jaguar, and two young children. However, Joe's life is not the dream it appears to be.

== Reception ==
The Monthly Film Bulletin wrote: "Another thoroughly mean-spirited film of a kind which has been taking root in the British cinema over the past few years. ... This is social criticism run down and gone to seed. ... Dramatically speaking, the film is concocted out of updated versions of the oldest clichés of melodrama. ... The film is even further – and centrally – flawed by its ambiguous attitude to Joe himself. His vague stirrings of conscience and self-awareness are quickly drowned as soon as his own interests are at stake; but the film can't resist trying to have its cake and eat it, so that for the first half, his budding awareness of the hollowness of his way of life is allowed to assume almost heroic proportions, as though he really were crusading against the corruption and pretensions of his milieu. Ted Kotcheff, starting off inauspiciously with a couple of ugly dramatic zooms as Abe Brown presides over his boardroom, directs with heavy reliance on TV-style close shots, and the brusque editing style looks like a desperate attempt to give the film some sort of momentum. Laurence Harvey and Jean Simmons do their best with thankless roles, Donald Wolfit overacts enthusiastically, and the rest of the cast are inconspicuous, except for a marvellously languid Margaret Johnston, who relishes one wonderfully bitchy scene in which, aware that Susan has been sleeping with her husband, she tears the poor girl to pieces over the cocktail glasses."

== See also ==
- Man at the Top, a 1970 TV series featuring Joe Lampton in later life.
