= Stay with Me Till Morning =

1970 novel

- First edition
- Author: John Braine
- Language: English
- Genre: Drama
- Publisher: Eyre & Spottiswoode
- Publication date: 1970
- Publication place: United Kingdom
- Media type: Print

Stay with Me Till Morning is a 1970 novel by the British writer John Braine.

In 1981 it was adapted into a three-part television series by the same name. Produced by Yorkshire Television it starred Nanette Newman and Keith Barron.

== Bibliography ==
- Baskin, Ellen. Serials on British Television, 1950-1994. Scolar Press, 1996.
- Stringer, Jenny & Sutherland, John. The Oxford Companion to Twentieth-century Literature in English. Oxford University Press, 1996.
