= The Boo Radleys =

English alternative rock band

- Origin: Wallasey, England
- Genres: Alternative rock; shoegazing; dream pop; Britpop; noise pop; indie pop; neo-psychedelia
- Years active: 1988–1999, 2021–present
- Labels: Action; Creation; Rough Trade; Columbia (US)
- Members: Tim Brown; Simon Rowbottom; Rob Cieka
- Past members: Martin Carr; Steve Hewitt
- Website: www.thebooradleys.com

The Boo Radleys are an English alternative rock band who were associated with the shoegazing and Britpop movements in the 1990s. They originally formed in Wallasey, England, in 1988, with singer/guitarist Simon "Sice" Rowbottom, guitarist/songwriter Martin Carr, and bassist Tim Brown. Their name is taken from the character Boo Radley in Harper Lee's 1960 novel, To Kill a Mockingbird. The band went on hiatus in 1999.

In their 11-year-long career, the band had one top-ten single, 1995's "Wake Up Boo!", which charted at no. 9, and a number-one album, Wake Up!. The band reunited in 2021, without Carr, and released a single, "A Full Syringe and Memories of You", their first new music since 1998. Paul Banks of Interpol has cited the band as an influence, as have The Electric Soft Parade.

== Career ==
=== Beginnings ===
In 1990, the band's first album Ichabod and I was released on a small British indie label, Action Records. Although not a commercial success, this release brought the band to the attention of Rough Trade Records, to whom they signed. Around this time, Hewitt was replaced on drums by Rob Cieka. Hewitt then went on to drum for Placebo until 2007.

Almost immediately after the release of the Every Heaven EP in 1991, Rough Trade collapsed and the Boo Radleys were signed by Alan McGee's Creation Records. Their first for Creation was Everything's Alright Forever in 1992, and Giant Steps (1993) followed. Giant Steps was awarded 9/10 by the UK music magazine NME, which stated, "It's an intentional masterpiece, a throw-everything-at-the-wall bric-a-brac of sounds, colours and stolen ideas. That The Boo Radleys (of all people!) have decided to accept their own challenge and create a record as diverse and boundary-bending as this is, at first glance, staggering. Isn't this the job of the U2s and the leisured idols of rock, unable to do anything without the tacit approval of history? Fortunately not. The Boo Radleys are sifting through time (the mid-'60s, mostly) and conjuring up something that's as cut-up and ambitious as anything you'd care to mention". Reviewing the album's re-release in 2008, Sic Magazine wrote, "For 64 minutes they were the greatest band on the planet."

The Boo Radleys in 1993

Giant Steps placed second to Debut by Björk in the 1993 NME album of the year list, voted by the paper's contributors, although it came in first place in the subsequent NME readers' poll. The now-defunct Select magazine declared Giant Steps their album of the year for 1993. The Boo Radleys also appear on the original motion picture soundtrack to the 1993 film So I Married An Axe Murderer with their cover of The La's song "There She Goes".

=== Wake Up! and beyond ===
Despite critical acclaim and a cult fanbase, the Boo Radleys were still largely unknown to the general public by the time the Britpop phenomenon broke into the mainstream in 1995. This changed when the band released the upbeat single "Wake Up Boo!" in the spring of that year. It made the Top 10 in the UK Singles Chart, peaking at number 9. The single remained on the chart for two months, by far the band's longest run for any of its singles; later, on 26 October 2009, BFBS Forces Radio launched its live Afghanistan studio output with the track after it topped a listeners poll seeking a suitable first track. Carr describes writing the song watching The Big Breakfast after a night on acid. The follow-up release, "Find the Answer Within," was the band's only other single to chart for more than two weeks. Their fourth album Wake Up! (1995), was their commercial peak. Interviewed in 2005 by the BBC, Carr said: "I tried to have nothing to do with what was being called Britpop. Our whole career was spent trying not to 'fit in'. We just carried on doing what we had been doing. I didn't like most of the new bands or the flag-waving. I didn't like New Labour or idolise Paul Weller and I hated media-generated movements within music". The same year the band featured on Help with "Oh Brother", exclusive to that release. Help was a charity album aimed at raising funds for War Child, also featuring various other artists such as Radiohead and the Manic Street Preachers.

In 1996, the Boo Radleys released their fifth album C'mon Kids. As explained by Rowbottom in an interview in 2005: "We didn't want to scare away the hit-kids, we wanted to take them with us to somewhere that we'd not been before. All we wanted to do was make a different type of album than Wake Up... All we wanted to do was try something new – to keep ourselves fresh and interested. We were very surprised to find that it was seen as a deliberate attempt to scare away newly created fans. That would have been an extremely foolish thing to do."

The Boo Radleys' final album was 1998's Kingsize. One single was released from the album, "Free Huey!". The title track was due to have been released as a second single, but the band decided to split up. Sice later told Time Out magazine: "It was such a relief when Martin phoned me and said he didn't want to make any more records. We'd been wanting it to stop for quite a long time, but I couldn't do it – I didn't want to leave. I wanted the band to end and only Martin could have done that. There was always the fear if I left, that they would just get another singer in and I didn't want that. Never mind not having the heart to tour – I barely had the heart to go down to the studio while we were making Kingsize."

A compilation album, Find the Way Out, was released in 2005, and a further compilation The Best of the Boo Radleys appeared in 2007.

=== Disbandment ===
The Boo Radleys disbanded in early 1999. Brown built a recording studio before going on to John Moores University for teacher training. He progressed on to teaching information technology at St Louis's Grammar School in Kilkeel, County Down, in Ulster, and also taught at Park High School in Birkenhead.

Under the name Bravecaptain, Carr has since released six albums, including The Fingertip Saint Sessions Volume 1, Go with Yourself, Advertisements for Myself (2002) and All Watched Over by Machines of Loving Grace (2004). His most recent album was titled Distractions. Carr has since announced that he will be retiring the Bravecaptain name to work on new projects, but these will not include reforming the Boo Radleys. His first solo album Ye Gods (And Little Fishes) was released in mid 2009 and re-released on vinyl in 2024 on the AV8 label. After signing to the Hamburg label, Tapete, he released two albums, 'The Breaks' (2914) and 'New Shapes Of Life' (2017). In 2025 he released the odds and sods LP 'The Canton Hours' on his Sonny Boy Records label. Carr has made videos for The Lilac Time, Love, Ace of Cups and Sons of Adam among others. He is also a collagist.

Cieka is now a member of the band Domino Bones, alongside Mark "Bez" Berry, formerly of Happy Mondays.

After an album in 1996 (First Fruits) under the name Eggman, while still a member of the Boo Radleys, Rowbottom walked away from music for several years after the split. Then, following a guest vocal on Bravecaptain's All Watched Over by Machines of Loving Grace, and also two songs with the Japanese musician Ryo Matsui's solo project, Meister, he formed Paperlung. The band featured Rowbottom on vocals, Simon Gardiner on bass, Ben Datlen on guitar and Guillaume Jambel of Transcargo on drums. They released two singles, "The Days That God Sold You" (2006) and "Do What Thou Will", and an album, Balance (2007).

=== Reunion and new music ===
In 2020, it was reported that some members of the Boo Radleys were coming together to record new music to mark 25 years since the band's heyday.

In July 2021, the band released their first new single in 23 years, "A Full Syringe and Memories of You", part of an EP of the same name. Upon the single's release, it was confirmed that original guitarist Martin Carr was not invited to take part in the reunion.

The band's seventh studio album, Keep on with Falling, was released on 11 March 2022. Eight was announced in January 2023 to be released in the same year alongside the new single "Seeker".

In 2025, the band's 1992 single "Lazarus" was used as the ending theme song for the Japanese anime series Lazarus, directed by Shinichiro Watanabe.

The band returned in 2026 with their ninth album, In Spite of Everything.

== Members ==
=== Current lineup ===
- Simon "Sice" Rowbottom – vocals, guitar (1988–1999, 2021–present), keyboards (2021–present)
- Tim Brown – bass, keyboards (1988–1999, 2021–present), guitar (2021–present)
- Rob Cieka – drums, percussion (1990–1999, 2021–present)

=== Former members ===
- Martin Carr – guitar, vocals, keyboards (1988–1999)
- Steve Hewitt – drums (1990)

=== Session musicians ===
- Roddy Lorimer – flugelhorn, trumpet (1992)
- Steve Kitchen – flugelhorn, trumpet (1993)
- Chris Moore – trumpet (1993)
- Lindsay Johnston – cello (1993)
- Margaret Fielder – cello (1993)
- Jackie Toy – clarinet, bass clarinet (1993)
- Meriel Barham – vocals (1993)

== Discography ==
The Boo Radleys discography
- Studio albums: 9
- EPs: 6
- Soundtrack albums: 1
- Compilation albums: 3
- Singles: 18

The discography of the Boo Radleys consists of nine studio albums, three compilation albums, six extended-plays, and eighteen singles one of which ("Lazarus") was released twice, along with remixes of the same song, and their final single ("Kingsize") which was cancelled before release.

=== Studio albums ===
Year	Information	Chart positions
Year	Information	UK
1990	Ichabod and I: Released: July 1990; Label: Action	–
1992	Everything's Alright Forever: Released: March 1992; Label: Creation	55
1993	Giant Steps: Released: August 1993; Label: Creation	17
1995	Wake Up!: Released: March 1995; Label: Creation	1
1996	C'mon Kids: Released: September 1996; Label: Creation	20
1998	Kingsize: Released: October 1998; Label: Creation	62
2022	Keep on with Falling: Released: March 2022; Label: Boostr	–
2023	Eight: Released: June 2023; Label: Boostr	–
2026	In Spite of Everything: Released: May 2026; Label: Boostr	–

=== Compilation albums ===
Year	Information
1992	Learning to Walk: Released: November 1992; Label: Rough Trade
2005	Find the Way Out: Released: July 2005; Label: Castle Music
2007	The Best of the Boo Radleys: Released: May 2007; Label: Camden

=== Extended plays ===
Year	Information	Chart positions
Year	Information	UK
1990	Kaleidoscope: Label: Rough Trade	–
1991	Every Heaven: Label: Rough Trade	–
1991	Boo Up!: Label: Rough Trade	–
1992	Adrenalin (aka "Lazy Day" promo on Columbia in US): Label: Creation	–
1992	Boo! Forever (credited as a double A-side "Does This Hurt" / "Boo! Forever" for chart purposes): Label: Creation	67
2021	"A full Syringe and Memories of You": Label: Boostr	–

=== Singles ===
Year	Title	Chart positions				Album
Year	Title	UK	IE	NZ	US Alt	Album
1992	"Lazy Day"	–	–	–	–	Everything's Alright Forever
1992	"Does this Hurt?"	67	–	–	–	Everything's Alright Forever
1992	"Lazarus"	76	–	–	30	Giant Steps
1993	"I Hang Suspended"	77	–	–	–	Giant Steps
1993	"Wish I Was Skinny"	75	–	–	–	Giant Steps
1994	"Barney (...and Me)"	48	–	–	30	Giant Steps
1994	"Lazarus" (remixes)	50	–	–	–	Giant Steps
1995	"Wake Up Boo!"	9	25	35	–	Wake Up!
1995	"Find the Answer Within"	37	–	–	–	Wake Up!
1995	"It's Lulu"	25	–	–	–	Wake Up!
1995	"From the Bench at Belvidere"	24	–	–	–	—
1996	"What's in the Box (See Whatcha Got)"	25	–	–	–	C'mon Kids
1996	"C'mon Kids"	18	–	–	–	C'mon Kids
1997	"Ride the Tiger"	38	–	–	–	C'mon Kids
1998	"Free Huey"	54	–	–	–	Kingsize
1998	"Kingsize" (cancelled)	–	–	–	–	Kingsize
2021	"A Full Syringe and Memories of You"	–	–	–	–	Keep on with Falling
2021	"I've Had Enough I'm Out"	–	–	–	–	Keep on with Falling
2022	"Keep on with Falling"	–	–	–	–	Keep on with Falling
2023	"Seeker"	–	–	–	–	Eight
2023	"The Unconscious"	–	–	–	–	Eight
