= New Shapes of Life =

Studio album by Martin Carr
- Released: 27 October 2017
- Length: 30:52
- Label: Tapete

Martin Carr chronology
The Breaks (2014)	New Shapes of Life (2017)

Professional ratings
Aggregate scores
Source	Rating
Metacritic	71/100
Review scores
Source	Rating
AllMusic	3/5 stars
Clash	9/10
Pitchfork	7.5/10

New Shapes of Life is the third studio album by musician Martin Carr under his own name after releasing six solo albums under the name bravecaptain from 2000 to 2004. It was released on 27 October 2017 through Tapete Records.

== Track listing ==
No.	Title	Length
1.	"New Shapes of Life"	4:09
2.	"Damocles"	3:13
3.	"The Main Man"	4:27
4.	"Future Reflections"	3:44
5.	"A Mess of Everything"	4:12
6.	"Three Studies of the Male Back"	4:15
7.	"The Van"	4:18
8.	"The Last Song"	2:34
