= Kingsize (The Boo Radleys album) =

Studio album by the Boo Radleys
- Released: 19 October 1998
- Genres: Britpop, indie rock
- Length: 62:33
- Label: Creation
- Producer: The Boo Radleys

The Boo Radleys chronology
C'mon Kids (1996)	Kingsize (1998)	Keep on with Falling (2022)

Kingsize is the sixth album by the Boo Radleys, released in 1998. The band broke up shortly after the album's release.

The vinyl and US CD versions of the album included the extra song "Put Your Arms Around Me And Tell Me Everything's Going To Be OK".

== Background ==
The Boo Radleys released their fifth studio album C'mon Kids in 1996; guitarist Martin Carr said it was made with alienating their new fans in mind. Though the album charted highly in the UK, it fell off the chart quickly, as was the case of its singles "C'mon Kids", which peaked at number 18, and "What's in the Box?", which peaked at number 25. By the time of the album's release in the United States in March 1998, the band had no further interest in it. Author Dave Thompson, in his book Alternative Rock (2000), described Kingsize as: "Back to Wake Up basics, the dream comes of age. Pulling together their past explorations, then pulling out all the stops, plush production, superb arrangements, and orchestration, exquisite songwriting, mature and insightful lyrics ..."

== Release ==
Kingsize was released in the UK in late 1998, and in the US by early 1999; the band had broken up by the time of the latter in February 1999.

== Reception ==
Professional ratings
Review scores
Source	Rating
AllMusic	2/5 stars
Alternative Rock	8/10
Wall of Sound	83/100

Thompson said the Boo Radleys crafted a "regal album and a worthy epitaph for this monumental band."

The album was not a commercial success and received mixed reviews. The album charted at number 62 in the UK albums chart; the lead single "Free Huey" reached only number 54. "Kingsize" was scheduled as a second single and was to be released before the end of 1998, promos were even pressed with b-sides, but the band's split derailed the release. A month after the album's release, sales stood at over 10,000 copies.

== Track listing ==
All tracks are written by Martin Carr.

No.	Title	Length
0.	"Tranquillo" (hidden track)	1:00
1.	"Blue Room in Archway"	4:28
2.	"The Old Newsstand at Hamilton Square"	4:33
3.	"Free Huey"	3:06
4.	"Monuments for a Dead Century"	5:58
5.	"Heaven's at the Bottom of This Glass"	2:15
6.	"Kingsize"	4:42
7.	"High as Monkeys"	6:22
8.	"Eurostar"	3:53
9.	"Put Your Arms Around Me and Tell Me Everything's Going to Be OK" (Vinyl and US CD versions only)	2:50
10.	"Adieu Clo Clo"	4:10
11.	"Jimmy Webb Is God"	3:36
12.	"She Is Everywhere"	4:11
13.	"Comb Your Hair"	3:51
14.	"Song from the Blueroom"	4:07
15.	"The Future Is Now"	7:15
Total length:		62:33

== Personnel ==
- Sice - vocals
- Rob Cieka - drums, percussion
- Tim Brown - bass guitar, keyboards
- Martin Carr - guitar, keyboards, vocals
