= Keep on with Falling =

Studio album by The Boo Radleys
- Released: March 11, 2022
- Studio: Tower Studio
- Genre: Alternative rock; Britpop
- Length: 42:09
- Language: English
- Label: BooSTR, Universal Music Group
- Producer: Tim Brown

The Boo Radleys chronology
Kingsize (1998)	Keep on with Falling (2022)	Eight (2023)

Keep on with Falling is a 2022 studio album by British alternative rock band The Boo Radleys. It is their first studio release in 24 years and their first as a trio.

== Reception ==
Keep on with Failing received positive reviews from critics noted at review aggregator Metacritic. It has a weighted average score of 70 out of 100, based on four reviews. Editors at AllMusic rated this album 4 out of 5 stars, with critic Tim Sendra writing that the new line-up of the band without former songwriter Martin Carr "actually works pretty well" and this album is "a batch of songs that have all the hooks, energy, and breathless joy of the vintage Boos at their best". In The Arts Desk, Nick Hasted considers Keep on with Failing 3 stars out of 5, stating that this comeback "recall[s] their strengths" and concludes "ignoring nostalgia, they’ve found a songwriting future". Writing for Pitchfork, Robert Ham rated this release a 6.2 out of 10, writing that it "lacks the fuel and fire to elevate it from a good Britpop record into a great Boo Radleys record" and that some songs "are well-constructed and catchy" but "those tunes are never more than pleasantly vanilla".

== Track listing ==
All songs on the standard edition written by Tim Brown, Rob Cieka, and Sice Rowbottom.

1. "I've Had Enough I'm Out" – 3:05
2. "Keep on with Falling" – 3:15
3. "All Along" – 3:00
4. "I Say a Lot of Things" – 2:56
5. "Tonight" – 4:08
6. "A Full Syringe and Memories of You" – 4:28
7. "Call Your Name" – 4:05
8. "Here She Comes Again" – 3:53
9. "You and Me" – 4:10
10. "I Can't Be What You Want Me to Be" – 4:54
11. "Alone Together" – 4:19

Deluxe Edition bonus disc

1. "I'll Put the Bars Around My Heart" (Alternative Version) – 3:26
2. "Thieves Like Us" – 4:03
3. "All Along" (Alternative Version) – 3:21
4. "Tonight" (Alternative Version) – 3:32
5. "I Can't Be What You Want Me to Be" (Piano Version) – 4:06
6. "Alone Together" (Alternative Version) – 4:46
7. "See It Through" – 3:23
8. "Life Is Getting Better" – 5:14
9. "I'll Put the Bars Around My Heart" – 3:32

Digital edition bonus live album

1. "A Full Syringe and Memories of You" (Live in Newcastle) – 4:27
2. "I've Had Enough I'm Out" (Live in Newcastle) – 3:08
3. "Kingsize" (Live in Birmingham) – 4:35
4. "Alone Together" (Live in London) – 4:07
5. "I Say a Lot of Things" (Live in Newcastle) – 3:01
6. "Finest Kiss" (Live in Birmingham) – 5:46
7. "Lazarus" (Live in London) – 5:53
8. "You and Me" (Live in Manchester) – 4:09
9. "Everything is Sorrow" (Live in Bristol) – 4:39
10. "All Along" (Live in Birmingham) – 3:02

== Personnel ==
The Boo Radleys

- Tim Brown – bass guitar, keyboards, mixing, production
- Rob Cieka – drums, percussion
- Simon "Sice" Rowbottom – vocals, guitar

Addidtional personnel

- Edward Haughian – engineering
- Paul Mac – mastering at Hargrove Mastering
- Stephen A. Wood – cover art

== See also ==
- Lists of 2022 albums
