= Wake Up! (The Boo Radleys album) =

Studio album by the Boo Radleys
- Released: 27 March 1995
- Recorded: September–October 1994
- Studio: Rockfield, Rockfield, Monmouthshire, Wales
- Genre: Alternative rock, Britpop, baroque pop
- Length: 51:29
- Label: Creation
- Producer: The Boo Radleys

The Boo Radleys chronology
Giant Steps (1993)	Wake Up! (1995)	C'mon Kids (1996)

Singles from Wake Up!
- 1. "Wake Up Boo!" Released: 27 February 1995; 2. "Find the Answer Within" Released: 1 May 1995; 3. "It's Lulu" Released: 17 July 1995

Wake Up! is the fourth album by British alternative rock band the Boo Radleys, released by Creation Records in 1995.

== Background ==
The Boo Radleys released their third studio album Giant Steps in 1993; it reached number 17 on the UK Albums Chart. All three of its singles became hits on the UK Singles Chart, "I Wish I Was Skinny" at number 75, "Lazarus" at number 50 and "Barney and Me" at number 48. "Lazarus" also gained some traction in the United States; to capitalize on it, they toured that country US as part of Lollapalooza festival in August and September 1994. Wake Up! was recorded at Rockfield Studios in Rockfield, Monmouthshire, Wales in September and October 1994 with the band served as producers. Andy Wilkinson acted as engineer with assistance from Paul Read. The recordings were then mixed at The Church Studios in London in November 1994 by Al Clay with assistance from Matt Sime.

== Composition ==
In addition to their regular roles in the band, some of the members played additional instruments: Bassist Tim Brown played piano and keyboard; guitarist Martin Carr played glockenspiel, keyboard, harmonica and percussion; and drummer Rob Cieka played keyboard and a bell. The album opens with the sunshine pop track "Wake Up Boo!", and is followed by the acoustic song "Fairfax Scene", which evokes the sound of Crosby, Stills, Nash & Young. "It's Lulu" starts with an a cappella intro, before leading into upbeat, horn-centric indie pop. "Joel", another acoustic song, is done in the style of traditional English folk, with Beatlesque backwards guitarwork and ambient sections. "Find the Answer Within" touches on psychedelia; "Charles Bukowsi Is Dead" alludes to Camden Town and includes a homage to "Parklife" (1994) by Blur. "4am Conversation" displays the band's use of vocal harmonies and is followed by the guitar pop of "Twinside". The album ends with "Wilder", which consists of piano, percussion and Sice's vocals.

== Release and promotion ==
Following the success of Definitely Maybe (1994) by Oasis, Creation Records' owner Sony Music Entertainment wanted more chart success from the label. After the departure of marketing consultant Tim Abbot, John Andrews became his successor in November 1994. While Abbot had previously tried to market the label in his own image, Andrews was more concerned with simply selling records. Andrews was tasked with achieving commercial success for Teenage Fanclub and the Boo Radleys. Guitarist Martin Carr said upon meeting Andrews for the first time, he was "scaring me with all this talk about marketing. It was the first time we'd ever been asked to participate alongside marketing and take an interest in it". Upon hearing the album's final mixes in November 1994, staff from the label argued over the first choice of a single. Assistant press officer Andy Saunders, along with Carr, proposed "Wake Up Boo!", while co-founder Dick Green wanted the less commercial-sounding "It's Lulu".

Saunders chalked this up to the old-school way of thinking at the label, not wanting to seem like the band sold-out. Three other staff members agreed with Green, which resulted in Saunders exclaiming, "You are insane. This ['Wake Up Boo!'] is a smash". Creation Records used the emerging Britpop movement to help push promotion for Wake Up!. To tie in with scene, Andrews organized a retail campaign with Our Price and Virgin Megastores, which included releases from the Boo Radleys, Blur and Elastica. Despite the album's success, founder Alan McGee said the band were approaching them for money to help fund touring. Alongside this, McGee mentioned that they had "indie bands doing stuff that wasn't indie at all – the Boo Radleys being interviewed by Richard and Judy, doing children's programmes". As Carr was a driven-kind of person, he agreed to any opportunity in this vein, while Sice became unenthusiastic with this type of promotion. Following an interview with SKY Magazine, Sice and Saunders got into an argument that saw the latter being fired as the band's publicist.

The Boo Radleys subsequently supported Blur for a one-off show at the Mile End Stadium in London; following this, they performed at the Glastonbury and Reading Festival. Though the album's accompanying singles helped keep the band's profile high in mainland Europe, it did not fare as well in the US. Columbia Records, who distributed Creation Records' releases in the US, dropped the band from their roster sometime afterwards.

=== Singles and related releases ===
"Wake Up Boo!" was released as the album's lead single on 27 February 1995. Two versions were released on CD: the first with an edit of "Wake Up Boo!", "Janus", "Blues for George Michael" and "Friendship Song", while the second included an alternative version of "Wake Up Boo!", "...And Tomorrow the World" and "The History of Creation Parts 17 & 36". As an important element of Andrews' marketing campaign for the single, he wanted it to be priced at £1.99, and increase by two pounds the week after its release, which was in line with what major labels did for their single release. Green and business manager James Kyllo were hesitant about this, while Andrews was adamant about it being key to the song's potential success.

"Find the Answer Within" was released as the album's second single on 1 May 1995. Two versions were released on CD: the first with "Don't Take Your Gun to Town" and "Wallpaper", while the other featured a remix of "Find the Answer Within", "The Only Word I Can Find" and "Very Together". When "Find the Answer Within" was added to BBC Radio 1's playlist, "Wake Up Boo!" was not removed. This resulted in a situation where the radio presenter would plug "Find the Answers Within", but play "Wake Up Boo!" instead. "It's Lulu" was released as a single in the UK on 17 July 1995. It was released to modern rock radio stations in the US in September 1995. Two versions were released on CD: the first with the single version of "It's Lulu", "This Is Not About Me" and remixes of "Reaching Out from Here" and "Martin, Doom! It's Seven O'Clock", while the second included the single version of "It's Lulu", a remix of "Joel", "Tambo" and "Donkey".

Cherry Red Records released a three-CD edition of the album that featured all of the related B-sides in 2010. Wake Up! was re-pressed on vinyl in 2019 by the label Music on Vinyl. "Joel", "Find the Answer Within" and "Reaching Out from Here" were included on the band's second compilation album Find the Way Out (2005). "Wake Up Boo!", "It's Lulu", "Find the Answer Within", "Reaching Out from Here", "Stuck on Amber" and "4am Conversation" were featured on the band's third compilation album The Best of the Boo Radleys (2007).

== Reception ==
Professional ratings
Review scores
Source	Rating
AllMusic	5/5 stars
Alternative Rock	8/10
The Guardian	4/4 stars
NME	9/10
Select	5/5
Uncut	4/5 stars

Author Dave Thompson, in his book Alternative Rock (2000), said the inclusion of 1960s influences sees the "world wak[ing] up to the wonders of Boo."

Although the band had received critical acclaim with their previous album, Giant Steps, Wake Up! was their first true commercial success, reaching number one in the UK album charts. This was due in large part to two factors: the emergence of Britpop as a driving force in mid-1990s British music, and a Top 10 single, "Wake Up Boo!". Journalist David Cavanagh said the song would become one of defining songs of the genres, and in the ensuing years, it "floated off into the world of classic pop radio programming," alongside "Walking on Sunshine" (1985) by Katrina and the Waves and "Lovely Day" (1977) by Bill Withers.

Two further singles were released from the album: "Find The Answer Within" (with two versions available, one an early fade of the album version, the other a remix by The High Llamas) and "It's Lulu". Both reached the UK Top 40 but were unable to repeat the popularity of "Wake Up Boo!".

"Wake Up Boo!" was ranked at number 67 on Spin's "The 95 Best Alternative Rock Songs of 1995" list.

== Track listing ==
All songs written by Martin Carr.

1. "Wake Up Boo!" – 3:37
2. "Fairfax Scene" – 2:14
3. "It's Lulu" – 3:04
4. "Joel" – 6:10
5. "Find the Answer Within" – 4:34
6. "Reaching Out from Here" – 3:02
7. "Martin, Doom! It's Seven O'Clock" – 6:21
8. "Stuck on Amber" – 5:24
9. "Charles Bukowski Is Dead" – 2:39
10. "4am Conversation" – 2:43
11. "Twinside" – 4:45
12. "Wilder" – 6:56

== Personnel ==
Personnel per booklet.

The Boo Radleys

- Sice – lead vocals, handclaps (tracks 11)
- Tim Brown – bass (all except track 10), piano (tracks 1 and 12), keyboard (tracks 2, 4, 7–10 and 12)
- Martin Carr – guitar, backing vocals (tracks 1–5, 7 and 10–12), glockenspiel (tracks 5 and 9), keyboard (tracks 7, 8 and 10), harmonica (track 8), handclaps (tracks 11), percussion (tracks 12)
- Rob Cieka – drums (tracks 1–9, 11 and 12), percussion (tracks 1, 3, 7, 10 and 12), keyboard (track 4), bell (track 12)

Additional musicians

- Simon Gardner – trumpet (tracks 1)
- Neil Sidwell – trombone (tracks 1)
- Nigel Hitchcock – saxophone (tracks 1)
- Scottie – handclaps (tracks 1)
- Dick Green – guitar (track 2)
- Steve Kitchen – trumpet (tracks 3, 4 and 11), flugelhorn (track 7)
- Chris Moore – trumpet (tracks 3, 4 and 11)
- Lindsay Johnston – cello (tracks 4, 8 and 10)
- Fay Sweet – viola (tracks 4, 8 and 10)
- Peter Fry – double bass (tracks 4, 8 and 10)

Production and design

- The Boo Radleys – producer
- Andy Wilkinson – engineer
- Paul Read – assistance
- Al Clay – mixing
- Matt Sime – assistance
- Stephen A. Wood – sleeve art
- Joel Graphics – typeset layout reprographics
- Toby Egelnick – final assemblage
- Roger Sargent – band photography
