= Waiting for Sheila =

1976 Novel

- First edition
- Author: John Braine
- Language: English
- Genre: Drama
- Publisher: Methuen Publishing
- Publication date: 1976
- Publication place: United Kingdom
- Media type: Print

Waiting for Sheila is a 1976 novel by the British writer John Braine.

Julian Barnes wrote a scathing review of the novel in the New Statesman, leading Braine to respond in a letter in which he attacked Barnes saying, "I'm not going to be reproved for materialism by a thoroughgoing middle-class materialist".

== Bibliography ==
- Vanessa Guignery. Julian Barnes from the Margins: Exploring the Writer's Archives. Bloomsbury Publishing, 5 Mar 2020.
