= The Last Flight (The Twilight Zone) =

- The Twilight Zone episode
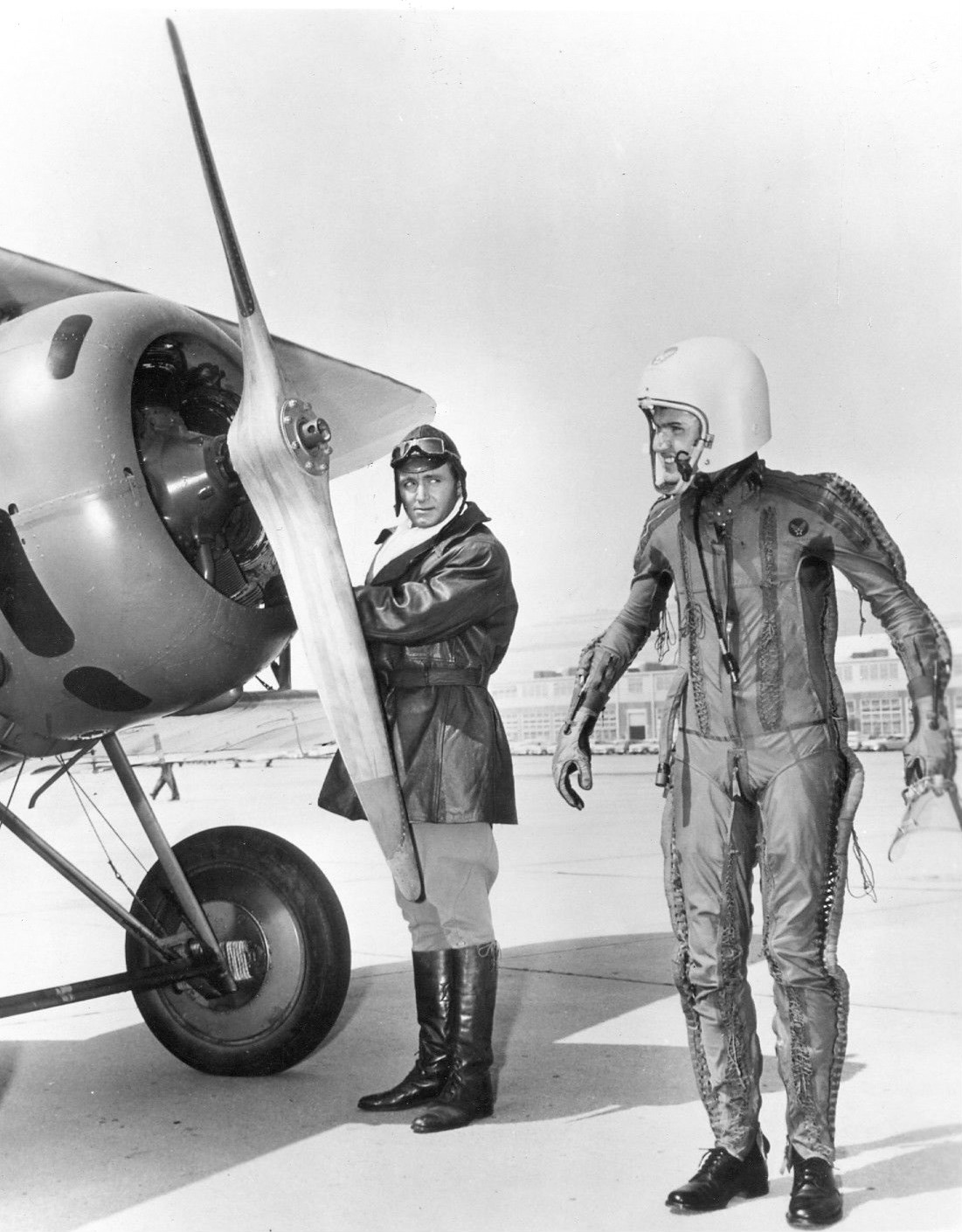
- Publicity shot from "The Last Flight"
- Episode no.: Season 1 Episode 18
- Directed by: William F. Claxton
- Written by: Richard Matheson
- Based on: "Flight" by Richard Matheson
- Production code: 173-3607
- Original air date: February 5, 1960

Guest appearances
- Kenneth Haigh as Flight Lt. Decker; Simon Scott as Major Wilson; Alexander Scourby as General Harper; Robert Warwick as Air Vice Marshal Alexander Mackaye; Harry Raybould as Corporal; Jerry Catron as Guard; Jack Perkins as Mechanic; Paul Baxley as Jeep driver

Episode chronology
← Previous "The Fever"	Next → "The Purple Testament"
- The Twilight Zone (1959 TV series, season 1)

"The Last Flight" is the eighteenth episode of the American television anthology series The Twilight Zone. Part of the production was filmed on location at Norton Air Force Base in San Bernardino, California. The vintage 1918 Nieuport 28 biplane was both owned and flown by Frank Gifford Tallman, and had previously appeared in many World War I motion pictures.

Harry Raybould plays an unnamed Corporal, Jerry Catron plays an unnamed guard, Paul Baxley plays an unnamed driver (uncredited), and Jack Perkins plays an unnamed ground crewman (uncredited).

== Opening narration ==
Witness Flight Lieutenant William Terrance Decker, Royal Flying Corps, returning from a patrol somewhere over France. The year is 1917. The problem is that the lieutenant is hopelessly lost. Lieutenant Decker will soon discover that a man can be lost not only in terms of maps and miles, but also in time—and time in this case can be measured in eternities.

== Plot ==
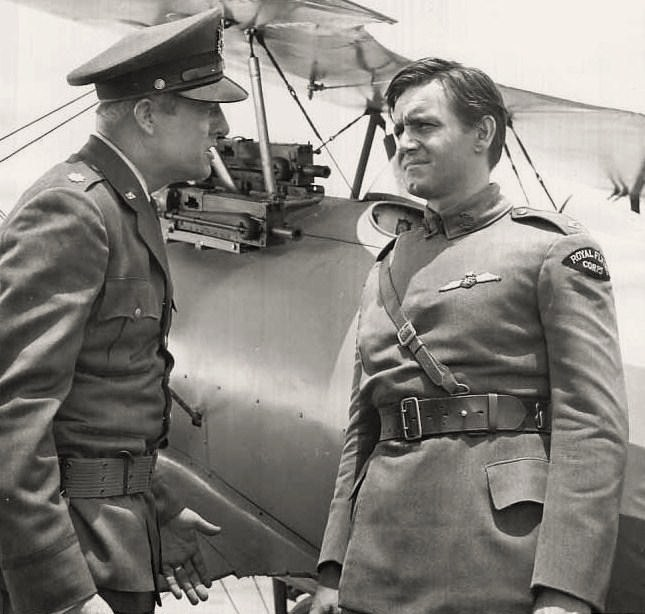
Simon Scott and Kenneth Haigh.

Flight Lieutenant William Terrance "Terry" Decker of the World War 1 56th Squadron Royal Flying Corps lands his Nieuport biplane on an American airbase in France after flying through a strange cloud. He is immediately accosted by provost marshal Major Wilson, who is dumbfounded by Decker's archaic appearance. Decker, likewise, is baffled, but by the unexplainable large modern aircraft. He is then taken into custody and questioned by the American base commander, Major General George Harper, and by Wilson. Decker snaps to attention, identifying himself as being from the UK's Royal Flying Corps. Harper and Wilson are also puzzled by his antiquated uniform. Decker asks where he is. When asked the date, Decker answers March 5, 1917. When they inform him it is March 5, 1959, he is stunned.

Decker learns that his flying partner, Alexander Mackaye, is an air vice-marshal and a hero in World War I who saved hundreds, if not thousands, of lives by shooting down three German bombers. By chance, Mackaye is coming to the base that very day for an inspection. Decker says that is impossible, as Mackaye is dead. Harper, at this time, confiscates Decker's pistol and personal effects. Later, Major Wilson questions the young man. Decker refers to Mackaye by a private nickname, "Old Leadbottom", explaining that at one point, he was shot in an embarrassing spot by German infantry. Decker finally confesses that he is a coward who avoided combat throughout his service, and that he deliberately abandoned Mackaye when the two were attacked by a flight of German fighters. He refuses to believe that Mackaye somehow survived against such odds.

When Wilson suggests that someone helped him, Decker realizes that he has been given a second chance. He tells the American officer that there was no one within 50 miles who could have come to Mackaye's aid, so if Mackaye survived, it had to be because Decker went back himself. Decker pleads with Wilson to release him. When Wilson refuses, Decker assaults him and a guard and escapes. Outside, he locates his plane, punches a mechanic who tries to get in his way, and starts the plane's engine. He is about to take off when Wilson catches up and puts a pistol to his head. Decker tells Wilson he will have to shoot him to stop him. After hesitating, Wilson lets him go. Decker flies into the strange cloud and vanishes.

Harper rebukes Wilson for believing such a fantastic story and for allowing "that maniac" to escape. When Mackaye arrives, Wilson asks him if he knows a William Terrance Decker; he replies, "Oh I certainly should know him—he saved my life." Mackaye proceeds to recount how Decker and he were jumped by seven German aircraft while out on patrol. Mackaye thought at first that Decker had fled, but suddenly Decker came diving down, seemingly out of nowhere, with his guns blazing, and proceeded to shoot down three enemy planes before being shot down himself. General Harper then shows him Decker's confiscated identification card (with a photo) and other personal effects. This leaves Mackaye stunned. When he demands an explanation, Wilson says, "Maybe you'd better sit down, Old Leadbottom."

== Closing narration ==
Dialog from a play, Hamlet to Horatio: There are more things in heaven and earth than are dreamt of in your philosophy. Dialog from a play written long before men took to the sky: There are more things in heaven and earth and in the sky than perhaps can be dreamt of. And somewhere in between heaven, the sky, and the earth, lies the Twilight Zone.

== Episode notes ==
This was the first episode of The Twilight Zone scripted by Richard Matheson. Rod Serling had previously adapted the episodes "And When the Sky Was Opened" and "Third from the Sun" from short stories of Matheson's.

Radio historian Martin Grams Jr. noted the similarities between this episode and a 1948 episode of the acclaimed radio drama series Quiet, Please called "One for the Book". According to Grams' book The Twilight Zone: Unlocking the Door to a Television Classic, Serling himself was so concerned about the similarities that he attempted to buy the rights to the Quiet, Please episode to avoid any potential copyright infringement.

The American "airbase in France" where this episode was filmed was actually Norton Air Force Base, a former USAF base in San Bernardino, California now known as San Bernardino International Airport.
