= Wake Up Boo! =

1995 single by the Boo Radleys

Single by the Boo Radleys

from the album Wake Up!
- Released: 27 February 1995
- Studio: Rockfield (Monmouthshire, Wales)
- Genre: Britpop
- Length: 3:37
- Label: Creation
- Songwriter: Martin Carr
- Producer: The Boo Radleys

The Boo Radleys singles chronology
"Lazarus" (re-release) (1994)	"Wake Up Boo!" (1995)	"Find the Answer Within" (1995)

Music video
- "Wake Up Boo!" on YouTube

"Wake Up Boo!" is a song recorded by British indie band the Boo Radleys for their fourth album, Wake Up! (1995). Released in February 1995 by Creation Records, it is their biggest hit both in the UK and internationally. The track, written by Martin Carr and produced by the band, is an upbeat guitar-pop song about the change from summer to autumn, contrasting the narrator's optimism ("Wake up, it's a beautiful morning") with his companion's pessimism ("You have to put the death in everything"). Part of the song was used as a jingle by Chris Evans for his BBC Radio 1 breakfast show in the mid nineties.

== Composition and recording ==
According to Martin Carr, he spent a year working on the song's music. He described the lyrics of the song as being "about staying up all night". In a 2021 interview, Sice said that "Wake Up Boo!" was "about grabbing the last of summer while you can", and described it as a reflection of Carr's personality: "He can be very up and ebullient – 'Wake up, it’s a beautiful morning' – and then he can have that drop: 'You have to put the death in everything'". The band first recorded the song at Real World Studios in a heavier, more downbeat arrangement, which Tim Brown described as "a bit underwhelming". After pressure from Creation Records, they re-recorded it at Rockfield Studios, where they were inspired to use a Motown beat after listening to a Style Council b-side. They also recruited Tom Jones' brass section to play on the track.

== Versions ==
On the album version of the song, the "Wake up, it's a beautiful morning" refrain is performed as an a cappella round as a prelude to the main track; this is absent from the single edit, which is otherwise identical. The second CD single and 12" feature a version called "Wake Up Boo!: Music for Astronauts" which has three distinct segued sections: the standard radio edit in full, followed by a version of the a cappella round, and finally a mostly instrumental electronic dance track reprising musical elements of the main song. It was this "Music for Astronauts" version which later featured on the group's self-selected "best of" compilation, Find the Way Out, along with the B-side, "Blues for George Michael". The basic single version has never appeared on a Boo Radleys album (their other greatest hits collection Best of The Boo Radleys contains the album version) though it has appeared on many various artist collections.

== Critical reception ==
In his weekly UK chart commentary, James Masterton said, "All of a sudden the bunch of Liverpudlians have turned on the magic and released what has to be the best single of the year so far, and then some. Quite simply it is the perfect piece of exuberent pop, an exquisite pastiche of the Liverpool beat bands that inspired a whole generation before them, complete with Beatlesque harmonies and a melody that could have been lifted from every Monkees record ever made." Caitlin Moran from Melody Maker named it Single of the Week, praising it as "the First Pop Moment of 1995, and it's horny and glorious and confident". She added, "This is so obviously going to be a Huge Hit you can practically hear the traffic news coming up over the fade-out." Pan-European magazine Music & Media wrote, "If you're young in the UK you either make dance or '60s-inspired pop. In the latter category the uncrowned champions the Boo Radleys deserve an equal share of the media attention as Oasis." Music Week gave it five out of five and also named it Single of the Week. The reviewer described it as "a Wham!-style upbeat, summer song", adding that "it's a song to make you smile".

Dele Fadele from NME felt the "cool slices of whimsy don't come any slicker than this: 'Wake Up Boo!' is both an anti-slacking song and a tune that laments the passing of the seasons. With Motown beats, sprightly horns, Mamas and Papas harmonies and a positive — ie, non-depressing — lyric, The Boo Radleys are at one with nature, offering you a near-perfect lump of sugar. Go on, try some." In her review of the album, Gina Morris from Select wrote, "It opens with 'Wake Up Boo!' and several moments of ludicrous, swishy choirboy harmonies, before thunderously erupting into a big horn intro and a beaty bounce-along three minutes of pop to sell your auntie for." Also Pete Stanton from Smash Hits gave it five out of five. He named it "the happiest song of the fortnight", and felt they had written "a classic. Every radio station should be playing this on their morning shows. It's light, it's fancy, it makes you wish summer was here". Jonathan Bernstein from Spin found that on the "horn-drenched" song, "they're capable of forging a foot-stomper as exuberant" as Haircut 100's 'Fantastic Day'.

== Music video ==
The promotional music video for "Wake Up Boo!" was filmed at Battersea Power Station.

== Track listings ==
CD One

All tracks are written by Martin Carr.

No.	Title	Length
1.	"Wake Up Boo!"	3:09
2.	"Janus"	3:08
3.	"Blues For George Michael"	8:49
4.	"Friendship Song"	5:26
Total length:		20:32

CD Two

All tracks are written by Martin Carr.

No.	Title	Length
1.	"Wake Up Boo!: Music For Astronauts"	8:55
2.	"...And Tomorrow The World"	4:37
3.	"The History Of Creation Parts 17 & 36"	4:37

12-inch

All tracks are written by Martin Carr.

No.	Title	Length
1.	"Wake Up Boo!: Music For Astronauts"	8:55
2.	"Janus"	3:08
3.	"Blues For George Michael"	8:49

== Credits and personnel ==
- Martin Carr – writing, backing vocals, guitar, keyboards,
- Sice – lead vocals
- Tim Brown – bass, piano, keyboards
- Rob Cieka – drums
- The Boo Radleys – production
- Andy Wilkinson – engineering
- Stephen A. Wood – cover art

== Charts ==
=== Weekly charts ===
Chart (1995)	Peak position
Europe (Eurochart Hot 100)	39
Europe (European Hit Radio)	10
Finland (Suomen virallinen lista)	20
Germany (GfK)	65
Iceland (Íslenski Listinn Topp 40)	11
Ireland (IRMA)	25
Israel (IBA)	24
Scottish Singles Sales (Official Charts)	7
UK Singles (Official Charts)	9
UK Indie (Music Week)	1

=== Year-end charts ===
Chart (1995)	Position
Iceland (Íslenski Listinn Topp 40)	77
UK Airplay (Music Week)	12

== Certifications ==
Region	Certification	Certified units/sales
United Kingdom (BPI)	Silver	200,000^{‡}
^{‡} Sales+streaming figures based on certification alone.

== Release history ==
Region	Date	Format(s)	Label(s)	Ref.
United Kingdom	27 February 1995	12-inch vinyl; CD; cassette	Creation	
Australia	10 April 1995	CD; cassette	Creation	
Japan	22 June 1995	Compilation CD	Creation	
