= Simon Scott (actor) =

American actor

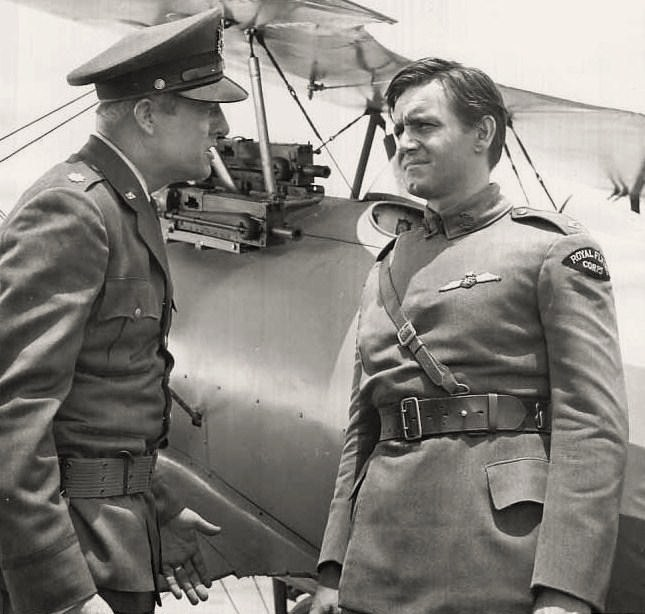
- Simon Scott (left) & Kenneth Haigh in The Twilight Zone episode "The Last Flight" (1960)
- Born: Daniel Scott Simon; September 21, 1920
- Died: December 11, 1991 (aged 71); Los Alamitos, California, U.S
- Occupation: Actor
- Years active: 1952–1985

Simon Scott (September 21, 1920 – December 11, 1991) was an American character actor from Monterey Park, California. He was best known for his role as Arnold Slocum on Trapper John, M.D. and as General Bronson on McHale's Navy.

== Career ==
Scott became a company member at Peninsula Players Theatre in Fish Creek, Wisconsin in 1950 using the name Dan Scott prior to his Hollywood success. He performed in many stage productions with the theater, including the 1948 production of The Second Man, the 1950 production of You Can't Take it With You and the 1963 production of The Night of the Iguana.

Scott starred in the early episodes of Markham as John Riggs, the title character's sidekick. However the character of Riggs was dropped after only eight episodes. Scott made five guest appearances on Perry Mason, including the role of murderer Stanley Overton in one of the series' final episodes in 1966 titled "The Case of the Positive Negative". He also appeared on dozens of other TV series, making numerous appearances each on series including 77 Sunset Strip, Bonanza, The F.B.I., Cannon, The Invaders, and Ironside. Scott also played in Barnaby Jones, in an episode titled “Trap Play” (01/07/1975).

Scott also had a recurring role as Chief Metcalf on the ABC series The Mod Squad. In addition he also guest starred on series including The Munsters, The Fugitive, Mannix and most notably the 1960 The Twilight Zone episode "The Last Flight".

== Death ==
Scott died on December 11, 1991, in Los Alamitos, California of complications of Alzheimer's disease. The disease had forced him into retirement six years earlier.

== Filmography ==
- 1954: The Raid as Captain Floyd Henderson (uncredited)
- 1954: Black Tuesday as Parker (uncredited)
- 1956: I've Lived Before as Robert Allen, Attorney
- 1956: Accused of Murder as Jeff, Daytime Desk Cop (uncredited)
- 1957: Battle Hymn as Lieutenant Hollis
- 1957: Man of a Thousand Faces as Carl Hastings
- 1959: No Name on the Bullet as Reeger
- 1959: Compulsion as Detective Brown (uncredited)
- 1961: The Honeymoon Machine as Captain Harvey Adam
- 1962: Moon Pilot as Medical Officer
- 1962: The Couch as Lieutenant Kritzman
- 1963: The Ugly American as Johnson
- 1964: Shock Treatment as Police Desk Sergeant (uncredited)
- 1964: Ready for the People (TV Movie) as District Attorney
- 1964: Father Goose as Captain of Submarine, USS Sailfin (uncredited)
- 1965: Strange Bedfellows as Jim Slade, Divorce Lawyer (uncredited)
- 1965: The Loved One as Priest at Meeting (uncredited)
- 1966: Dead Heat on a Merry-Go-Round as William Anderson
- 1968: In Enemy Country as General Jomar
- 1969: Anatomy of a Crime (TV Movie) as George Harrington
- 1970: The Cliff (TV Movie)
- 1971: Cold Turkey as Mr. Kandiss
- 1972: Welcome Home, Johnny Bristol (TV Movie) as Colonel Anderson
- 1972: The Man as Hugh Gaynor
- 1972: Sam Cade - Marshal of Madrid (series special of Cade's County)
- 1973: Six Million Dollar Man, The: Wine, Women and War as Captain Dawson
- 1974: The Disappearance of Flight 412 (TV Movie) as Colonel Freeman Barns
- 1975: The Hindenburg as Luftwaffe General
- 1977: Tail Gunner Joe (TV Movie) as Robert Ten Broeck Stevens
- 1977: Twilight's Last Gleaming as General Phil Spencer
- 1979: The Return of Mod Squad (TV Movie) as Metcalf

== Television ==
- 1952: Biff Baker, U.S.A. as Perkins
- 1955: Gunsmoke as Mr. Rogers
- 1958: Perry Mason 1x39 The Case of the Rolling Bones as George Metcalf, 3x06 The Case of Paul Drake's Dilemma as Charles Dameron, 5x22 The Case of the Crippled Cougar as Elliot Dunbar, 8x03 The Case of the Scandalous Sculptor as Rex Ainsley, 9x28 The Case of the Positive Negative as Stanley Overton
- 1959: Markham as John Riggs
- 1959–1968: Bonanza 1x13 Vendetta as Tom Pryor, 3x20 Lost Yesterday as Trev Holcomb, 5x09 Dead-Eye Dick as District Attorney, 7x14 All Ye His Saints as Evan Thorpe (1965), 9x22 The Late Ben Cartwright as Judge John Farraday (1968)
- 1959: The Twilight Zone
- 1962: Alcoa Premiere 2x12 The Potentate as Raknitch
- 1962: Surfside 6 2x31 Green Bay Riddle as Chris Nordheim
- 1962: Saints and Sinners 1x07 A Servant in the House of My Party as Bill Wexler
- 1962: GE True 1x10 Cheating Cheaters as Captain
- 1962: Going My Way 1x08 A Matter of Principle as Larry Raymond
- 1961–1963: 77 Sunset Strip 4x13 "The Navy Caper" as Captain Bill Ivers, 4x21 "Brass Ring Caper" as Brad Kalem, 5x01 "The Reluctant Spy" as Hank Rush, 5x15 "Scream Softly, Dear" as Warren Collins
- 1963: General Hospital as Fred Fleming
- 1963: Hawaiian Eye 4x13 Kupikio Kid as Judson Kirk
- 1963–1964: The Alfred Hitchcock Hour
  - (Season 1 Episode 17: "Forecast: Low Clouds and Coastal Fog") (1963) as Stanley 'Stan' Wilson
  - (Season 2 Episode 9: "The Dividing Wall") (1963) as Durrell
  - (Season 3 Episode 10: "Memo from Purgatory") (1964) as The Defender
- 1963–1964: Temple Houston 1x11 Seventy Times Seven as Sheriff Hab Martin, 1x26 Miss Katherine as Henry Rivers
- 1963–1964: Bob Hope Presents the Chrysler Theatre 1x08 The Candidate as Dr. Bross, 1x21 A Slow Fade to Black as Henderson
- 1963–1966: The Virginian 2x05 The Evil That Men Do as Warden Fred Harris
- 1964: The Rogues 1x10 Fringe Benefits as Gus Becker
- 1964: Mr. Novak 2x05 One Monday Afternoon as Ralph Donan
- 1965: I Spy 1x12 Three Hours on a Sunday Night as Mr. Starrett
- 1965: Voyage to the Bottom of the Sea 1x23 The Human Computer as Reston
- 1965: A Man Called Shenandoah 1x08 Town on Fire as Tom Wade
- 1965: Death Valley Days 14x07 No Place for a Lady as Samuel Magoffin
- 1965: Convoy 1x02 Flight from Norway as General Walther Korsch
- 1965–1966: McHale's Navy 4x07 The Bald-Headed Contessa, 4x08 Voltafiore Fish-Fry, 4x11 The McHale Opera Company, 4x13 Blitzkrieg at McHale's Beach, 4x16 The Boy Scouts of 73, 4x17 Fire in the Liquor Locker, 4x21 McHale's Country Club Caper, 4x22 Secret Chimp 007, 4x27 The McHale Grand Prix, all as General Bronson
- 1966: T.H.E. Cat 1x10 To Bell T.H.E. Cat as Senator
- 1966: The Munsters 2x31 Herman's Lawsuit as Wilbur Kingsley
- 1966: Pistols 'n' Petticoats 1x09 Cards Anyone as Sloan
- 1966: The Fugitive 4x05 Ten Thousand Pieces of Silver as Martin Pierce
- 1966–1968: The Wild Wild West 1x24 The Night of the Druid's Blood as Colonel Fairchild, 2x02 The Night of the Golden Cobra as Colonel Stanton Mayo, 4x03 The Night of the Juggernaut as Theodore Bock
- 1966–1969: The F.B.I. 1x24 The Man Who Went Mad by Mistake as John Goddard, 2x19 The Gray Passenger as Colfax, 3x01 The Gold Card as Aaron Kellin, 3x16 Crisis Ground as Talbot, 4x02 Out of Control as Douglas Benson, 5x06 Gamble with Death as Alexander York
- 1967: Iron Horse 2x09 Four Guns to Scalplock as Glenn Falconer
- 1967: Ironside 1x04 Dead Man's Tale as Warren Stuart, 1x15 Girl in the night as Jim Cardoff, 2x01 Shell Game as Waltham, 3x13 Beyond a shadow as John Lovell, 4x10 The man on the inside as Carmine De Bello
- 1967–1968: The Invaders 1x12 Storm as Dr. Ed Gantley / Professor Malcolm Gantley, 2x01 Condition: Red as Major Pete Stanhope, 2x19 The Pit as Dr. John Slaton
- 1968: The Outsider 1x13 There Was a Little Girl as George Harrington
- 1968: Mannix 2x01 The Silent Cry as Roger L. Wade
- 1968: The Name of the Game 1x07 Shine On, Shine On, Jesse Gil as Harvey Hampton
- 1968–1969: Judd, for the Defense 1x26 You Remember Joe Maddox as George Keefer, 2x22 The View from the Ivy Tower as Max Chancery
- 1968–1973: The Mod Squad 1x01 The Teeth of the Barracuda, 1x08 The Price of Terror, 1x19 The Uptight Town, 5x08 Corbey as Chief Barney Metcalf
- 1969 Medical Center 1x03 Emergency in Ward E as Carl Marriott
- 1970: Insight The 7 Minute Life of James Houseworthy as Clyde, Why Don't You Call Me Skipper Anymore? as William Lunt
- 1970: The Interns 1x05 Eyes of the Beholder as Jim
- 1970: Matt Lincoln 1x02 Charles
- 1971: Cade's County 1x04 Crisscross as Owen Rauth
- 1971: Days of Rage 1x24 Days of Rage as Walter Hendricks
- 1972: Longstreet 1x23 The Sound of Money Talking as Henry Benton
- 1972: The Sixth Sense 1x05 The Man Who Died at Three and Nine as Stuart Forbes
- 1972–1976: Cannon 2x12 The Endangered Species as Bill Coates (1972), 2x23 Press Pass to the Slammer, 3x12 Trial by Terror, 4x08 A Killing in the Family, 5x21 The Quasar Kill as Dr. Lawrence (1976), 5x25 Madman as General Stevenson
- 1972–1976: The Rookies 1x07 The Bear That Didn't Get Up as Mr. Palmer
- 1973: Search 1x21 Ends of the Earth as Timothy Slater
- 1973: Escape 1x1 The Sub as Admiral Lockery
- 1973: McCloud 4x02 The Solid Gold Swingers as Arthur Ferris
- 1973: The Wide World of Mystery 1.12 Night Train to Terror as McGuffin
- 1974: Owen Marshall: Counselor at Law I've Promised You a Father as Frank Bayliss
- 1974: The Magician 1x19 The Illusion of the Lethal Playthings as Jackson Wyndham
- 1974: The Six Million Dollar Man 2 episodes as Dr. Barto / Dr. Samuel Abbott
- 1974: Petrocelli 1x09 An Act of Love as Sam James, 1x17 A Lonely Victim as Ryder Carson
- 1975: The Manhunter 1x20 The Death Watch
- 1975: The Streets of San Francisco 2x09 The Twenty-Four Karat Plague as Professor William Mason
- 1975: Barnaby Jones 3x14 Trap Play as Paul
- 1975: Barbary Coast as Senator Manning / Brant Hollister
- 1975: Caribe 1x13 Assault on the Calavera as Gabriel Hopkins
- 1976: Once an Eagle in 4 episodes
- 1976: The Rockford Files 3x10 Piece Work as Gregory McGill
- 1977: The New Adventures of Wonder Woman as Sam Tucker
- 1977: Kingston: Confidential as Duane Maxwell
- 1977: The Hardy Boys/Nancy Drew Mysteries 1x01 The Mystery of the Haunted House as Man
- 1978: The Amazing Spider-Man The Deadly Dust: Part 1 as Dr. Baylor
- 1979–1985: Trapper John, M.D. as Arnold Slocum (final television appearance)
- 1980: Charlie's Angels 4x25/26 One Love... Two Angels: Part I+II as Richard Carver
- 1980: Galactica 1980 1x04 The Super Scouts, Part I as Captain
