= Room at the Top (1958 film) =

1958 British film by Jack Clayton

- Original British 1959 quad size film poster
- Directed by: Jack Clayton
- Screenplay by: Neil Paterson
- Based on: Room at the Top; 1957 novel by John Braine
- Produced by: John Woolf; James Woolf
- Starring: Simone Signoret; Laurence Harvey; Heather Sears; Donald Wolfit; Donald Houston; Hermione Baddeley
- Cinematography: Freddie Francis
- Edited by: Ralph Kemplen
- Music by: Mario Nascimbene
- Production company: Romulus Films
- Distributed by: British Lion Films
- Release date: 22 January 1959
- Running time: 115 minutes
- Country: United Kingdom
- Language: English
- Budget: £280,000 or £231,387
- Box office: $2,400,000 (US)

Room at the Top is a 1958 British drama film based on the 1957 novel by John Braine. It was adapted by Neil Paterson (with uncredited work by Mordecai Richler), directed by Jack Clayton (his feature-length debut), and produced by John and James Woolf. The film stars Laurence Harvey, Simone Signoret, Heather Sears, Donald Wolfit, Donald Houston, and Hermione Baddeley.

The film was widely lauded, and it was nominated for six Academy Awards, winning two: Best Actress (Signoret) and Best Adapted Screenplay (Paterson). Its other nominations at the 32nd Academy Awards were for Best Picture, Best Director (Clayton), Best Actor (Harvey), and Best Supporting Actress (Baddeley). Baddeley's performance, consisting of 2 minutes and 19 seconds of screen time, is the shortest ever to be nominated for an acting Oscar.

== Plot ==
Soon after the Second World War, in the West Riding of Yorkshire, England, Joe Lampton, an ambitious young man, moves from his hometown, the dreary factory town of Dufton, to the somewhat larger town of Warnley to assume a secure but poorly paid and dead-end post in the Borough Treasurer's Department. Determined to get ahead, and ignoring the warnings of his colleague and flatmate Charlie Soames, he pursues Susan Brown, the daughter of a local industrial magnate. She has been dating wealthy Jack Wales but Joe is able to charm her. Mr and Mrs Brown attempt to frustrate Joe's social climbing by persuading Joe's boss to encourage him to pursue a woman of his own class; getting him a job offer back in Dufton, which he refuses when he discovers the machination; and sending Susan on a trip abroad, but Susan remains smitten.

While pursuing Susan, Joe continues to see Alice Aisgill, an unhappily married Frenchwoman ten years his senior who came to England as a teacher a decade earlier and married George Aisgill, a haughty and abusive upper-middle class Englishman who is now having numerous affairs. Joe thinks he is just killing time with Alice and Alice says they can just be "loving friends". Their feelings for each other begin to turn into something more and Joe starts to lose interest in his pursuit of Susan. The relationship is passionate, tempestuous and after a particularly heated argument, Joe switches his focus back to Susan. He manages to take her virginity but is unsatisfied and finds himself drawn back to Alice.

Joe and Alice go away on a short holiday and Alice is overjoyed that Joe seems to have decided to end his quest for wealth and social status in favour of simply being happy with himself and with her. They decide she will ask for a divorce when she gets home but when she does, George refuses and declares he will ruin Joe and Alice, both socially and financially, if their relationship continues. While Joe is brooding over this, Mr Brown delivers the news that Susan is pregnant and that he expects Joe to stop seeing Alice and marry Susan, in which case Joe can come to work for him at a generous salary.

Seeing no way around his obstacles to a relationship with Alice, Joe tells her that he is going to marry Susan. Heartbroken, Alice gets drunk in a pub and the next morning, while his co-workers are celebrating his engagement, Joe hears that she drove her car off a cliff to which she and he used to go together and died slowly over the course of several hours. Devastated, Joe leaves the office and wanders to the flat where he and Alice had their trysts but Alice's friend Elspeth, who owns the flat, drives him away by screaming at him and blaming him for Alice's death.

Joe goes to a pub on the waterfront, where a woman named Mavis comes on to him because he is well-dressed. Although he is very drunk and does not seem very interested in her (he calls her Alice), Joe keeps a man from taking Mavis away against her will. When Joe is alone, the man and some of his friends beat Joe unconscious. In the morning, Charlie finds Joe lying in the street with a battered face but Joe's only concern is his guilt over what he feels he led Alice to do.

A short time later, Joe and Susan get married. With a rich wife and high-paying job, he has got everything he thought he wanted. As they are driven away after the wedding, Susan's effusive praise of the ceremony is cut short when she notices that there are tears in Joe's eyes, which she misinterprets by saying "I believe you really are sentimental after all".

== Cast ==
- Simone Signoret as Alice Aisgill
- Laurence Harvey as Joe Lampton
- Heather Sears as Susan Brown
- Donald Wolfit as Mr Brown
- Donald Houston as Charlie Soames
- Hermione Baddeley as Elspeth
- Allan Cuthbertson as George Aisgill
- Raymond Huntley as Mr Hoylake
- John Westbrook as Jack Wales
- Ambrosine Phillpotts as Mrs Brown
- Richard Pasco as Teddy Merrick
- Beatrice Varley as Joe's Aunt
- Delena Kidd as Eva
- Ian Hendry as Cyril
- April Olrich as Mavis
- Mary Peach as June Samson
- Anthony Newlands as Bernard
- Avril Elgar as Miss Gilchrist
- Thelma Ruby as Miss Breith
- Paul Whitsun-Jones as laughing man at bar (who tells Joe a joke at the dance)
- Derren Nesbitt as thug in fight on tow path (Mavis's possessive boyfriend)
- Derek Benfield as man in bar (uncredited)
- Richard Caldicot as taxi driver (uncredited)
- Wendy Craig as Joan (uncredited)
- Basil Dignam as priest (uncredited)
- Everley Gregg as Mayoress (uncredited)
- Jack Hedley as architect (uncredited)
- Miriam Karlin as Gertrude (uncredited)
- Wilfrid Lawson as Joe's Uncle Nat (uncredited)
- Prunella Scales as council office worker (uncredited)
- Julian Somers as St Clair (uncredited)
- John Welsh as Mayor (uncredited)

== Adaptation ==
There are some differences between Braine's novel and the film. For one, Joe's friend Charlie Soames is a friend from his hometown of Dufton in the novel, whereas, in the film, he meets Charlie in Warnley (which is called Warley in the book). Also, in the book, more is made of Joe's lodging at the Thompsons', which, in the novel, he arranged before his arrival in Warley (in the film, Charlie arranges it soon after they meet): it is through his association with the Thompsons that Joe is able to gain entry to a higher social circle than that to which he had previously had access, and Mrs Thompson's room is noted as being at "the top" of Warley geographically, which serves as a metaphor for Joe's social-climbing.

== Production ==
Producer James Woolf bought the film rights to Braine's novel, originally intending to cast Stewart Granger as Joe and Jean Simmons as Susan. Vivien Leigh was originally offered the part of Alice. Woolf hired Clayton as director after seeing The Bespoke Overcoat, an Academy Award-winning short film that was produced and distributed by companies founded by the Woolf brothers.

=== Shooting ===
For the production, in addition to filming on sets at Shepperton Studios in Surrey, there was extensive location-shooting in Halifax, Yorkshire, which stood in for the fictional towns of Warnley and Dufton. Greystones, a large mansion in the Savile Park area of Halifax, was used as the location for exterior scenes of the Brown family mansion; Halifax railway station doubled as Warnley Station in the film; and Halifax Town Hall was used as the Warnley Town Hall. The wedding was filmed at All Souls church, Boothtown, Halifax. Some scenes were also filmed in Bradford, notably the one in which Joe travels on a bus and spots Susan in a lingerie shop and those outside the amateur dramatics theatre.

Freddie Francis says John Woolf wanted to fire Francis during filming but Clayton refused.

== Reception ==
According to Variety, the film "opened to nearly unanimous raves from the London critics". Reviewing the movie for The New York Times, Abraham Weiler praised Braine's novel, which he compared favourably to John Osborne's Look Back in Anger, and noted the depth of Harvey's, Signoret's, and Sears's portrayals, concluding that the movie "may be basically cheerless and somber, but it has a strikingly effective view."

Room at the Top marked the beginning of Jack Clayton's career as an important director. It was the third most popular film at the British box office in 1959 (after Carry On Nurse and Inn of the Sixth Happiness), grossing $700,000.

Room at the Top is seen as the first of the British New Wave of kitchen-sink-realism film dramas. It was followed by a sequel in 1965 titled Life at the Top.

=== Awards and nominations ===
Award	Category	Nominee(s)	Result	Ref.
Academy Awards	Best Motion Picture	John Woolf and James Woolf	Nominated	
Academy Awards	Best Director	Jack Clayton	Nominated	
Academy Awards	Best Actor	Laurence Harvey	Nominated	
Academy Awards	Best Actress	Simone Signoret	Won	
Academy Awards	Best Supporting Actress	Hermione Baddeley	Nominated	
Academy Awards	Best Screenplay – Based on Material from Another Medium	Neil Paterson	Won	
British Academy Film Awards	Best Film from any Source		Won	
British Academy Film Awards	Best British Film		Won	
British Academy Film Awards	Best British Actor	Laurence Harvey	Nominated	
British Academy Film Awards	Best British Actor	Donald Wolfit	Nominated	
British Academy Film Awards	Best British Actress	Hermione Baddeley	Nominated	
British Academy Film Awards	Best Foreign Actress	Simone Signoret	Won	
British Academy Film Awards	Most Promising Newcomer to Film	Mary Peach	Nominated	
Cannes Film Festival	Palme d'Or	Jack Clayton	Nominated	
Cannes Film Festival	Best Actress	Simone Signoret	Won	
Golden Globe Awards	Best Actress in a Motion Picture – Drama	Simone Signoret	Nominated	
Golden Globe Awards	Samuel Goldwyn Award		Won	
Jussi Awards	Best Foreign Actress	Simone Signoret	Won	
Laurel Awards	Top Female Dramatic Performance	Simone Signoret	Nominated	
National Board of Review Awards	Top Foreign Films		2nd Place	
National Board of Review Awards	Best Actress	Simone Signoret	Won	
New York Film Critics Circle Awards	Best Film		Nominated	
New York Film Critics Circle Awards	Best Director	Jack Clayton	Nominated	
New York Film Critics Circle Awards	Best Actor	Laurence Harvey	Nominated	
New York Film Critics Circle Awards	Best Actress	Simone Signoret	Nominated	

== See also ==
- Life at the Top – the 1965 sequel
- Man at the Top – a 1970 TV series featuring Joe Lampton in later life
- Room at the Top – a 2012 two-part TV adaptation by BBC
- BFI Top 100 British films
