= The Queen of a Distant Country =

1972 novel by John Braine

- First edition
- Author: John Braine
- Language: English
- Genre: Drama
- Publisher: Methuen
- Publication date: 1972
- Publication place: United Kingdom
- Media type: Print

The Queen of a Distant Country is a 1972 novel by the British writer John Braine. A young writer returns to his northern home town, where he becomes obsessed with an older woman who was herself once a celebrated novelist.

== Bibliography ==
- Dale Salwak. John Braine and John Wain: A Reference Guide. G. K. Hall, 1980.
