= The Vodi =

First edition

The Vodi is a novel by John Braine, first published in the United Kingdom in 1959 by Eyre & Spottiswoode. A revised version was published in 1978.

== Plot summary ==
Dick Corvey is suffering from advanced tuberculosis in a provincial sanitarium. While confined to bed 24 hours a day, he meditates on various events from his earlier life, his friendship with Tom, his relationships with women, especially his brief engagement with Lois who abandoned him when his virtually hopeless condition had become apparent. A recurring theme is that of the Vodi, a malevolent race of small creatures invented by Tom when at school. The chief concern of the Vodi is to persecute and destroy the unlucky: the good and harmless people who invite the wrath of the Vodi by these very qualities (while the undeserving minority can enjoy good fortune and all life's comforts unhampered). Among others, Dick is tended by Nurse Evelyn Mallaton, whose sympathy and strong sexual attraction eventually give him the energy to rally against the disease and recover. However, while attracted to Dick, Evelyn understands his lack of prospects in the world and becomes engaged to a local businessman. Here emerges the main theme of the book: what Dick perceived as the distinction between the undeserved good and bad luck may in fact be the difference between a strong will and the lack of it. The novel ends with Dick bravely leaving the sanitarium where he has been offered a safe nursing job, to try to establish himself in the world on his own and perhaps get Evelyn back.

== Literary significance and criticism ==
The novel appears to have been unsuccessful on publication and rarely reprinted. Nevertheless, the book was Braine's own favourite, and the critic Martin Seymour-Smith described it as a "more interesting and imaginative work" than Room at the Top. The novelist M. John Harrison names The Vodi as one of his favourite books of all time, defining its genre as "kitchen sink gothic".
