= Jack Perkins (actor) =

American actor (1921–1998)

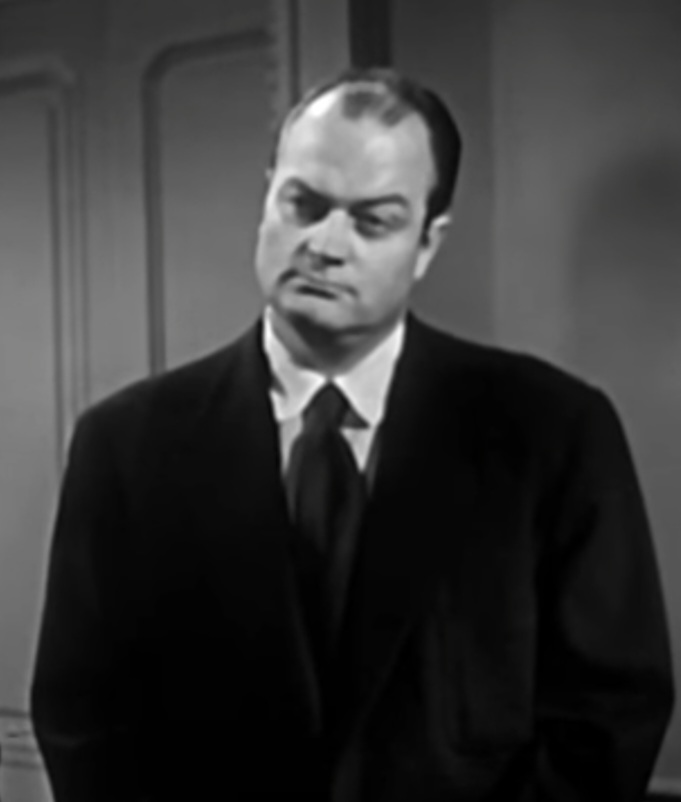
- Perkins in Man with a Camera (1959)
- Born: Earl John Perkins; September 19, 1921; Medford, Wisconsin, U.S.
- Died: March 7, 1998 (aged 76); Van Nuys, California, U.S.
- Occupation: Actor
- Years active: 1956–1983

Earl Jack Perkins (September 19, 1921 – March 7, 1998) was an American film and television actor. From 1956 to 1983, he appeared in over one hundred film and TV roles. He was perhaps best known for his many appearances on TV as a comic drunk.

== Background ==
Born in Medford, Wisconsin, Perkins served in the U.S. Marine Corps during World War II. He then went to what is now University of Wisconsin–Eau Claire, where he played football and then played football with the Chicago Rockets.

== Filmography ==
Film
Year	Title	Role	Notes
1958	The Badlanders	Miner	Uncredited
1960	Spartacus	Gladiator	Uncredited
1960	North to Alaska	Saloon Brawler	Uncredited
1962	The Wild Westerners	Trapper	Uncredited
1964	Advance to the Rear	Renegade	Uncredited
1965	The Great Race	Texas Jack Henchman	Uncredited
1965	The Glory Guys	Bartender	Uncredited
1966	Made in Paris	Burly Man	Uncredited
1967	The Fastest Guitar Alive	Burly Man	Uncredited
1968	A Man Called Gannon	Railroad Lineman	
1968	The Love Bug	Driver #37	
1968	Bread and Circuses (Star Trek: The Original Series)	Master of the Games	
1969	The Great Bank Robbery	Slade Gang Member	Uncredited
1970	There Was a Crooked Man...	Prisoner	Uncredited
1971	The Million Dollar Duck	Agitated Driver #2	Uncredited
1971	J. W. Coop	Brawler	Uncredited
1972	What's Up, Doc?	Jewel Thief	
1972	Fuzz	Parks Commissioner Cooper	
1972	The Limit	Drunk	
1972	The Daredevil	Police Officer	
1973	Invasion of the Bee Girls	Barney	
1974	Blazing Saddles	Desperado	Uncredited
1974	Nightmare Honeymoon	Carl	
1974	Bank Shot	Bank Guard	Uncredited
1975	The Strongest Man in the World	School Security Guard	Uncredited
1976	Freaky Friday	Car Cop	Uncredited
1976	Nickelodeon	Michael Gilhooley	
1977	Grand Theft Auto	Shadley	
1977	Ruby	Avery	
1979	The North Avenue Irregulars	Bouncer	
1979	The Apple Dumpling Gang Rides Again	Junction City Town Drunk	
1980	The Happy Hooker Goes Hollywood	Drunk Conventioner	
1980	Herbie Goes Bananas	Loud American	
1982	Night Shift	Tuttle	
1982	Flush		

TV
Year	Title	Role	Notes
1958	Man with a Camera	Henchman	1 episode
1959–1961	Peter Gunn	Sidney / Hood / Brawler / Bouncer at Club / Assailant	5 episodes
1960	The Twilight Zone	Ground Crewman	Episode: The Last Flight, Uncredited
1966	Green Acres	Sheriff's Deputy	1 episode
1966	The Munsters	The 2nd Drunk	1 episode
1966–1967	Petticoat Junction	Painter / Guard	2 episodes
1970	Adam-12	Drunk appearing to hang out window	S1 E22 "The Hero"
1971	The Odd Couple	Jesse (drunk in hotel lobby)	1 episode
1974	Killer Bees	Sale sman	TV movie
1975–1976	Happy Days	Drunk / Bob	2 episodes
