= Richard Beale (actor) =

British actor

Richard Henry Beale
- Born: 13 May 1920; Hackney, London, England
- Died: 27 March 2017 (aged 96); Somerset, England
- Occupation: Actor
- Children: 2

Richard Henry Beale (13 May 1920 – 27 March 2017) was a British actor. He had a long career in television, stage and film, dating back to the 1950s.

== Early years ==
Born in Hackney, London, England, Beale was the son of Henry and Constance Beale. He served as a Lieutenant in the Royal Navy during the Second World War. He worked ten years at his father's printing business before he ventured into acting.

== Career ==
Beale's early films included The Battle of the River Plate (1956), A Night to Remember (1958), and Sink the Bismarck! (1960).

== Personal life ==
His wife, whom he divorced, was named Anne. They had two children.

== Death ==
He died 27 March 2017 at the age of 96.

== Selected filmography ==
- The Battle of the River Plate (1956) – Capt. Pottinger (uncredited)
- A Night to Remember (1958) – Harbour Pilot (uncredited)
- Sink the Bismarck! (1960) – Petty Officer in Phone Montage (uncredited)
- The Flood (1963) – Grout
- Compact (1963–1964, TV Series) – Detective Sergeant Birling
- The Caves of Steel (1964) – Controller
- Gideon's Way (1964) – Capt. Vanner
- For Whom the Bell Tolls (1965, TV series) - Anselmo
- Doctor Who (1966–1973, TV Series) – Minister of Ecology / Broadcaster / Propaganda Seller / Bat Masterson / Refusian (voice)
- Where Eagles Dare (1968) – Telephone Orderly (uncredited)
- Softly Softly (1970, TV Series) – Harry
- Jude the Obscure (1971, TV Mini-Series) – Chivers
- Young Winston (1972) – Boer Sentry (uncredited)
- Z-Cars (1972–1974, TV Series) – Bordman / Peters
- War and Peace (1973, TV Series) – Hetman
- Special Branch (1974, TV Series) – Commander Glover
- Dixon of Dock Green (1975, TV Series) – Fred Gilbraithe
- Madame Bovary (1975, TV series) – Rouault
- Emmerdale Farm (1979, TV Series) – Tober Moore
- Secret Army (1979, TV Series) – Inspector Benet
- Stay with Me Till Morning (1981, TV series) – Jesse Thomas
- The Life and Times of David Lloyd George (1981, TV Series) – Lord Kitchener
- Bergerac (1983, TV Series) – Bank Manager
- Camille (1984, TV Movie) – Farmer
- C.A.T.S. Eyes (1985, TV Series) – Prinley
- The Tripods (1985, TV Series) – Ulf
- Return to Treasure Island (1986, TV Series) – Captain Smollett
- A Handful of Dust (1988) – Ben
- The Bill (1988–1996, TV Series) – Geoffrey Rowley / Walter Lepore / Tommy Reeves / Goodhall
- A Bit of a Do (1989, TV Series) – Lester Griddle
- Treasure Island (1990, TV Movie) – Mr. Arrow
- Agatha Christie's Poirot (1990, TV Series) – Merritt
- EastEnders (1990–1991, TV Series) – Jackie Stone
- Hedd Wyn (1992) – Army Representative
- Lovejoy (1994, TV Series) – Mervyn The Fisherman
- Food of Love (1997) – William
- Peak Practice (2002, TV Series) – Julian Rankin
- All About Me (2002) – Local
- Casualty (2004, TV Series) – Geoff Slavin
- Afterlife (2005, TV Series) – Mr. Keyhoe (final appearance)
