= The Pious Agent =

1975 novel by John Braine

- First edition
- Author: John Braine
- Language: English
- Genre: Thriller
- Publisher: Methuen
- Publication date: 1975
- Publication place: United Kingdom
- Media type: Print

The Pious Agent is a 1975 spy thriller novel by the British writer John Braine.

== Synopsis ==
Xavier Flynn, a devout Catholic but ruthless agent, is on the track of a secret revolutionary movement trying to sabotage Britain.

== Bibliography ==
- Jenny Stringer & John Sutherland. The Oxford Companion to Twentieth-century Literature in English. Oxford University Press, 1996.
