= Man at the Top (TV series) =

British drama television series (1970–1972)

- Genre: Drama
- Created by: John Braine
- Starring: Kenneth Haigh; Zena Walker
- No. of series: 2
- No. of episodes: 23

Production
- Producers: Jacqueline Davis; George Markstein
- Production company: Thames Television

Original release
- Network: ITV
- Release: 14 December 1970 – 4 September 1972

Man at the Top is a British drama television series that was originally broadcast on ITV from 14 December 1970 to 4 September 1972, consisting of 23 episodes. The series depicts the character of Joe Lampton, the protagonist of John Braine's novels Room at the Top (1957) and Life at the Top (1962), and of the films based on those novels (Room at the Top (1959) and Life at the Top (1965)). The role of Joe Lampton was played by Kenneth Haigh.

In 1973, a spin-off film from the series, Man at the Top, was released by Hammer Films.

== Cast ==
- Kenneth Haigh as Joe Lampton
- Zena Walker as Susan Lampton
- Mark Dignam as Abe Brown (series 1)
- Paul Hardwick as Abe Brown (series 2)
- Avice Landone as Margaret Brown
- Keith Skinner as Harry Lampton (series 1)
- Brendan Price as Harry Lampton (series 2)
- Colin Welland as Charlie Armitage
- James Donnelly as Teddy Soames
- Kim McCarthy as Barbara Lampton
- Janet Key as Dr. Helen Reid
- Ann Lynn as Jonni Devon
- Katy Manning as Julia Dungarvon
- Mark McManus as Dennis Rosslea

== Filming locations ==
Parts of series one were filmed in London. The opening and closing sections of series two show parts of the town of Dewsbury in West Yorkshire. Episode eight of series two also shows more town centre and surrounding footage of Dewsbury, and also of Bradford city centre in the early 1970s.
