= Man at the Top (film) =

- Directed by: Mike Vardy
- Written by: John Junkin; Hugh Whitemore
- Produced by: Peter Charlesworth; Jock Jacobsen
- Starring: Kenneth Haigh; Nanette Newman; Harry Andrews
- Cinematography: Brian Probyn
- Edited by: Chris Barnes
- Music by: Roy Budd
- Production companies: Hammer Films; Dufton Films
- Distributed by: Anglo-EMI
- Release dates: 16 September 1973 (UK); 10 November 1973 (US)
- Running time: 87 minutes
- Country: United Kingdom
- Language: English

Man at the Top is a 1973 British drama film directed by Mike Vardy and starring Kenneth Haigh, Nanette Newman and Harry Andrews. It was a spin-off from the ITV television series Man at the Top (1970–1972).

== Plot ==
Joe Lampton is promoted to managing director of a pharmaceutical company, and becomes involved with Lord Ackerman, the powerful chairman, who is also his father-in-law. But Joe makes a shocking discovery: his predecessor committed suicide because of his involvement in a drug that left 1,000 African women sterile. Joe threatens to reveal all to the press, while Lord Ackerman seeks to persuade him otherwise, by offering him promotion to Chief Executive.

== Cast ==
- Kenneth Haigh as Joe Lampton
- Nanette Newman as Lady Alex Ackerman
- Harry Andrews as Lord Ackerman
- William Lucas as Marshall
- Clive Swift as Massey
- Paul Williamson as Tarrant
- John Collin as Wisbech
- John Quentin as Digby
- Danny Sewell as Weston
- Charlie Williams as George Harvey
- Anne Cunningham as Mrs. Harvey
- Angela Bruce as Joyce
- Margaret Heald as Eileen
- Mary Maude as Robin Ackerman
- Norma West as Sarah Tarrant
- John Conteh as boxer

== Production ==
Shooting took place from 3 March to 7 April 1973.

== Reception ==
=== Box office ===
The film was not a success at the box office.

=== Critical ===
John Gillett wrote in The Monthly Film Bulletin: "As played by Kenneth Haigh, Lampton's coarse, chip-on-shoulder gruffness and wearying pop-eyed charm soon fall flat, but the film does score a point or two in its depiction of Ackerman's world, with its suave surface etiquette, cool boardroom manners and secret country house meetings (Harry Andrews' steely, banked-down performance is a decided asset). The little interlude on the road with the girls brings some pleasantly relaxed exchanges, but the film is less successful (and rather cheap) when dealing with Lampton's swift seduction of Ackerman's wife and daughter. Despite its moments of insight and sharp, bristling dialogue, it remains too much like a television episode stretched to movie length."

Variety wrote: "This spinoff of a popular British vidseries by the same name is a professionally-crafted entry in the middlebrow stakes, with the usual reliable performance by Kenneth Haigh who repeats his vidrole of the lower class boy making good – and fighting tooth and nail to get there – in the business and society bigtime. Though no blockbuster, pic should nevertheless perform well in general release situations."
