= Life at the Top =

1962 novel by English author John Braine

- First edition (UK)
- Author: John Braine
- Language: English
- Genre: Fiction
- Publisher: Eyre & Spottiswoode (UK), Houghton Mifflin & Co. (US)
- Publication date: 1962
- Publication place: England
- Media type: Print
- Pages: 308
- Preceded by: Room at the Top

Life At The Top is the third novel by the English author John Braine, first published in the UK by Eyre & Spottiswoode and in the US by Houghton Mifflin & Co. in 1962. It continues the story of the life and difficulties of Joe Lampton, an ambitious young man of humble origins. A 1965 film adaptation of the novel was made starring Laurence Harvey.

== Synopsis ==
It is 10 years from when last we learned of Joe's life in Room At The Top. He now has everything he thought he wanted – the upper-class wife, an executive job, two cars and two children for his new house. Yet, Joe is still a dissatisfied man; his job had not moved significantly forward in the last 10 years. This dissatisfaction leads him back to his old philandering ways, spurred by the knowledge of his wife's own infidelity. Joe and Susan separate temporarily, but toward the novel's close, Joe is drawn back to his life in Warley in response to trouble with his children and his knowledge of what his life needs.
