= Seyi Vodi =

Nigerian Fashion Entrepreneur

- Born: Seyi Adekunle; Osun State
- Education: University of Maiduguri
- Occupations: Businessman, Fashion Designer
- Years active: 2001 till date
- Known for: Founder of Vodi Group
- Website: voditailors.com

Seyi Adekunle is a Nigerian fashion businessman. He is the founder and chairman of Vodi Group, known for its chain of businesses. Seyi Vodi revealed that it was after he failed a bank employment test that he became spurred to go into fashion full-time. Seyi Vodi sells high quality clothes and has been patronized by some of the most famous and best of different industries. He is also a very hardworking man As of May 2017, Seyi Vodi was listed as one of the largest fashion labels in Nigeria.

== Early life and career ==
Seyi Vodi was born in Lagos but hails from Osun State. He obtained a degree in Geology from the University of Maiduguri. While undergoing his mandatory national youth service in Akwa Ibom, he befriended some tailors in the town and learnt how to sew from them. He started with sewing shirts and boxers for his colleagues who were his first clients. Seyi registered his company in 2001 as Testimony Fabrics but eventually changed the name to Vodi in 2003 as he wanted a name that sounded shorter and more African.

In 2002, Seyi Vodi failed a bank employment test and had his application declined by the bank he applied to. He attributed this failure to what motivated him to take his craft more seriously.

In 2003, Seyi eventually got a job in a bank but left to pursue a career in fashion designing. At that time, he had no shop but traveled around with a go-bag to buy materials, sew from home and deliver to his clients. As his business progressed, he expanded his company to what is now known as Vodi Group. Today, Vodi Group of which Seyi is CEO, includes Vodi Clean, Vodi Training Institute, Vodi Debo, Vodi Textile.

Seyi has listed Konosuke Matsushita as his greatest influence.
