= The Crying Game (novel) =

1968 novel by John Braine

- First edition
- Author: John Braine
- Language: English
- Genre: Satire
- Publisher: Eyre & Spottiswoode
- Publication date: 1968
- Publication place: United Kingdom
- Media type: Print
- Pages: 286
- ISBN: 041344290X
- OCLC: 465119

The Crying Game is a 1968 novel by British novelist John Braine. It is a satirical story about a conservative journalist whose life changes after he learns of a political scandal.

It has no connection with the film of the same name.
