= Everything's Alright Forever =

Studio album by the Boo Radleys
- Released: 1992
- Recorded: September–October 1991
- Studios: First Protocol, London
- Genres: Dream pop; noise pop; shoegaze
- Length: 50:09
- Labels: Creation CRECD 120; Columbia
- Producers: Ed Buller, the Boo Radleys

The Boo Radleys chronology
Ichabod and I (1990)	Everything's Alright Forever (1992)	Learning to Walk (1992)

Singles from Everything's Alright Forever
- 1. "Lazy Day" Released: 1992; 2. "Does This Hurt?" Released: 1992

Everything's Alright Forever is the second album by English indie rock band the Boo Radleys, released in 1992. The title is taken from The Dharma Bums by Jack Kerouac.

== Background ==
The Boo Radleys released their debut studio album Ichabod and I in 1990. After recording a session for the BBC in July 1990, Rob Cieka replaced drummer Steve Hewitt. By November 1990 they had signed to Rough Trade Records, with whom they issued the Kaleidoscope, Every Heaven and Boo Up! EPs, which became minor hits on the UK Independent Albums Chart. After Rough Trade collapsed in 1991, the band signed to Creation Records.

== Release ==
Soon after joining Creation Records, the band issued the Adrenalin EP, ahead of the release of Everything's Alright Forever. "Does This Hurt?" was released as the first track of the Boo! Forever EP in June 1992. Through frequent live performances, including a US tour with Sugar, and attention from the press, the band's profile rose.

== Critical reception ==
Professional ratings
Review scores
Source	Rating
AllMusic	3/5 stars
Alternative Rock	6/10
Calgary Herald	B+

Newsday called Everything's Alright Forever a "rewarding journey through light and dark, acoustic serenity brushing against pure white noise." The Calgary Herald determined that "buried beneath several coats of mind-gliding guitar are some of the catchiest pop songs this side of Teenage Fanclub."

The Rough Guide to Rock wrote that the album was "clear evidence that the band were developing" and that it contained "excellent pop tunes behind the array of effects pedals." Author Dave Thompson, in his book Alternative Rock (2000), wrote that the band "swirl, twirl, and at times outright buzz, it's all a bit of a Blur-y ride, but the pure pop-to-be still shines through."

== Track listing ==
All tracks are written by Martin Carr, except when noted.

No.	Title	Writer(s)	Length
1.	"Spaniard"		4:02
2.	"Towards the Light"		1:41
3.	"Losing It (Song for Abigail)"		4:01
4.	"Memory Babe"		3:19
5.	"Skyscraper"		4:46
6.	"I Feel Nothing"		3:06
7.	"Room at the Top"		5:05
8.	"Does This Hurt?"		3:56
9.	"Sparrow"		1:51
10.	"Smile Fades Fast"		3:13
11.	"Firesky"		5:06
12.	"Song for the Morning to Sing"		2:30
13.	"Lazy Day"	Carr, Boo Radleys	1:34
14.	"Paradise"		5:51

Early copies of the vinyl edition came with a free 7" single, "Sunfly".

== Personnel ==
- Sice – vocals
- Rob Cieka – drums, percussion
- Tim Brown – bass guitar, keyboards
- Martin Carr – guitar, keyboards, vocals

== Charts ==
Chart performance for Everything's Alright Forever
Chart (1992)	Peak position
UK Albums (Official Charts)	55
