= Room at the Top (2012 TV series) =

BBC television series

Room at the Top is a 2012 BBC television adaptation by Amanda Coe of John Braine's 1957 novel of the same name, with a cast led by Matthew McNulty, Maxine Peake and Jenna Coleman, and directed by Aisling Walsh.

== Summary ==
Based on John Braine's classic novel about a young man on the make in 1940s Yorkshire. Joe Lampton moves to the wealthy town of Warley.

During this period, he became involved with Susan Brown, the attractive daughter of a wealthy local businessman, while simultaneously pursuing a relationship with Alice Aisgill, an older married woman who's looks are beginning to fade.

== Production ==
It aired in two parts on 26 and 27 September 2012 on BBC Four, but was originally due to premiere on 7 April 2011. A statement at the time said that the delay was due to "a potential contractual issue", and it later emerged that another film company challenged the sale of the television rights to Great Meadow Productions, which produced the film for BBC. It won a BAFTA Award for Best Miniseries in 2013.
