= Room at the Top (novel) =

1957 novel by John Braine

- First edition
- Author: John Braine
- Cover artist: John Minton
- Language: English
- Published: 1957 Eyre & Spottiswoode
- Publication place: United Kingdom
- Media type: Print (hardback and paperback)
- Pages: 256 pp
- OCLC: 59499921

Room at the Top is a novel by John Braine, first published in the United Kingdom by Eyre & Spottiswoode in 1957, about an ambitious young working-class man who juggles sexual relationships with two middle-class women in a northern town in post-war England.

== Synopsis ==
Joe Lampton, demobilised at the end of the Second World War, is starting in a new job as an accountant with the Municipal Treasury in the Yorkshire market town of Warley. He is 25 years old and of working-class background from the industrial town of Dufton. He was in the RAF but spent most of the war as a POW, using this time to study accountancy. Joe has been living with his aunt and uncle because his parents were killed by a stray bomb during the war. He is determined to make something of himself, and dreams of a job paying £1,000 a year.

In Warley, he lodges with the Thompsons, who live in the most affluent part of town, known locally as "T'top". The Thompsons introduce him to the local amateur dramatic society and there he meets Susan Brown, the 19-year-old daughter of a successful local businessman. He also meets Alice Aisgill, who is nine years his senior, childless, and unhappily married to a businessman who is rumoured to be having an affair with his secretary.

Joe is attracted to Susan and invites her out to the ballet, even though she is ostensibly the girlfriend of Jack Wales, a rich former RAF officer with a distinguished war record. Susan accepts the invitation and they have an enjoyable evening. Afterwards, Joe drives past the large and expensive homes of Jack and Susan and laughs at himself for thinking that he could ever marry Susan. After rehearsing a play at the theatre, Alice and Joe drive to Sparrow Hill, overlooking Warley, where Alice seduces him. Alice asks Joe not to fall in love with her, but suggests they should become "loving friends".

Joe continues to date Susan while Jack is studying at Cambridge. Joe also pursues his sexual relationship with Alice, regularly meeting her at the flat of one of her friends. Returning to Dufton for Christmas, Joe tells his aunt that he is in love with Susan, but she warns him that Susan will break his heart and he should find a woman of his own social class.

While meeting at the flat, Alice mentions that she once modelled nude for an artist, and Joe berates her for demeaning herself. They have a heated argument during which she calls him a prude with a provincial mind. They agree to end their relationship. Soon afterward, Joe unexpectedly meets Susan and a party, and they agree to meet the following day. At the latter meeting they profess their love for each other, but Joe thinks of his triumph over Jack and the prospect of forcing Susan's father to give him a good job. He also thinks of his need for Alice.

Joe becomes frustrated by Susan's refusal to have sex with him, and he is discouraged by her parents' attempts to separate them. He reconciles with Alice, and they resume their sexual relationship. Susan finds out about the relationship and breaks with Joe, who is relieved that he can now concentrate his physical and emotional energies on Alice.

Joe and Alice take a holiday in Dorset where they profess their love for each other and plan to marry after Alice arranges a divorce. A few days later, Joe's friend Charles tells him that marrying Alice would ruin his life because she doesn't have money of her own and the scandal of a divorce would destroy his career. He also says Alice is too accustomed to a rich lifestyle and would leave him. Charles helps Joe write a letter to Susan, reaffirming his love for her and promising to break with Alice.

Susan is delighted by the letter and meets Joe at a secluded location near Warley. She demands that he immediately write to Alice breaking off their relationship. Joe refuses because Alice is recovering from major surgery and he wants to tell her in person after she leaves hospital. After an argument, Susan submits to Joe's violent sexual advances, telling him afterwards "You won't need her anymore, will you?"

Two months later, Joe still hasn't spoken with Alice. Susan's father invites Joe to lunch at his club and tells him that Susan is pregnant. He tells Joe that he can marry Susan with his consent on condition that he immediately break with Alice. He also offers Joe a job in his business with a salary of £1,000 per year.

Joe meets Alice at her friend's flat and tells her that he is engaged to Susan and that their relationship is over. After Joe leaves, Alice gets drunk and drives toward Sparrow Hill. She crashes into a wall at high speed, and she is killed. Joe hears of her death the following day and takes a bus to a nearby town where he gets drunk and has sex with a woman he meets in a pub. He collapses in the street, and he eventually is found by two friends from the dramatic society who have been looking for him. He tells them that he killed Alice, and they assure him that no one blames him for her death. He replies that that is the trouble.

== Dramatic adaptations ==
A British film adaptation of the same name was made in 1958, directed by Jack Clayton and starring Laurence Harvey as Joe Lampton, Simone Signoret as Alice, and Heather Sears as Susan. In 2012, the BBC screened a two-part TV adaptation.

== See also ==
- Life at the Top, a sequel that takes place 10 years later
- Man at the Top, a 1970 TV series featuring Joe Lampton in later life
