= John Braine =

English writer (1922–1986)

- Braine in 1962
- Born: 13 April 1922; Bradford, West Riding of Yorkshire, England
- Died: 28 October 1986 (aged 64)
- Occupation: Novelist
- Known for: Room at the Top (1957)

John Gerard Braine (13 April 1922 – 28 October 1986) was an English novelist. Braine is usually listed among the angry young men, a loosely defined group of English writers who emerged on the literary scene in the 1950s.

== Early life ==
John Braine was born in the Westgate area of central Bradford, West Riding of Yorkshire. The family later moved to the suburb of Thackley on the northern edge of the city. Braine left St. Bede's Grammar School at 16 and worked in a shop, a laboratory and a factory before becoming, after the war, a librarian in Bingley, a small town 5 miles (8 km) up the Aire Valley and at Darton in 1954 where locals put his inattention down to his spending his time writing his first novel.

== Works ==
Although he wrote 12 works of fiction, Braine is chiefly remembered today for his first novel, Room at the Top (1957). The novel was conceived when he was being treated for tuberculosis in a hospital near the Yorkshire Dales town of Grassington. He stated that his favourite author was Guy de Maupassant and that Room at the Top was based on Bel Ami, but that "the critics didn't pick it up". Room at the Top was turned into a successful 1959 film, with Laurence Harvey as Joe Lampton and featuring an Oscar–winning performance by Simone Signoret. In September 2012, BBC television broadcast a two-part dramatisation that had been delayed because of a dispute over copyright. Matthew McNulty was in the lead role.

After achieving literary success, Braine moved to the south of England, living from 1966 until his death in Woking. He wrote several more novels, including Life at the Top, a sequel to Room at the Top. His 1968 novel The Crying Game is set in London and captures some of the atmosphere of the 'Swinging Sixties' (it is not related to the 1992 film of the same name). His 1974 book, Writing a Novel, was a guide for aspiring novelists.

== Political views ==
Braine was mildly left-wing in his youth, but, like his contemporaries (and fellow "angry young men") Kingsley Amis and John Wain, he later moved to the political right and supported America's involvement in the Vietnam War. In 1967, Braine, Robert Conquest, Amis and several others signed a controversial letter to The Times titled "Backing for U.S. Policies in Vietnam", supporting the US government over Vietnam.

== Personal life ==
Braine was married to Patricia Wood and had four children. They separated in the early 1980s, and Patricia moved to Shropshire with the two youngest children. He died from a gastric haemorrhage in 1986 at the age of 64.

== Select bibliography ==
=== Fiction ===
- Room at the Top (1957) Reissued in 2013 by Valancourt Books
- The Vodi (1959) Reissued in 2013 by Valancourt Books
- Life at the Top (1962) Reissued in 2015 by Valancourt Books
- The Jealous God (1964)
- The Crying Game (1968) (not related to the 1992 film of the same title)
- Stay with Me Till Morning (1970) (U.S. title: "The View from Tower Hill")
- The Queen of a Distant Country (1972)
- The Pious Agent (1975)
- Waiting for Sheila (1976)
- Finger of Fire (1977)
- One and Last Love (1981)
- The Two of Us (1984)
- These Golden Days (1985)
- Man at the Top (Thames Television, 1970–1): five scripts for the first series of this drama based on Braine's character Joe Lampton

=== Non-fiction ===
- A Personal Record (Monday Club, 1968)
- Writing a Novel (1974)
- J.B. Priestley (1978)
