= Martin Carr =

English musician and writer

Martin Carr (born 29 November 1968) is an English musician and writer who was the chief songwriter and lead guitarist with the band The Boo Radleys. Born in Thurso, Scotland, he was raised in Wallasey, England.

== Early life and career ==
Carr was born in Thurso as his Mancunian father was working at the nuclear facilities at Dounreay at the time: the family moved to Merseyside when Carr was at a very young age. The first single he bought was "Message in a Bottle" by The Police. Martin attended St. Mary's College, Wallasey Village, and played an early gig with The Boo Radleys at The Grand nightclub in New Brighton.

After the breakup of the Boo Radleys, Carr launched a solo career, taking the name bravecaptain from a song by the U.S. rock band Firehose. His solo work has largely been more electronic based than his previous work, and mainly features himself on lead vocals, whereas in The Boo Radleys he rarely sang (despite writing the lyrics).

In 2008, Carr announced that he had recorded a new album in Cardiff with producer Charlie Francis and a few 'friends'. Martin Carr told music website The Quietus about his plans to release the album via the Bandstocks scheme. By the start of the following year Carr had abandoned the Bandstocks project, later commenting to music industry website HitQuarters that "it needs a lot of work and commitment to try and find investors and I couldn't offer either." Instead he released the album Ye Gods (and Little Fishes) in July 2009 on his own new imprint Sonny Boy Records, using the company State 51 for distribution.

In 2013 he provided the music for 'Snodgrass', a Sky Arts production, an imaginary scenario where John Lennon left The Beatles in 1962, Originally created by the writer Ian R MacLeod, the television adaptation was by David Quantick.

Carr explained, during a September 2014 interview for BBC 6music, that he had all but given up hope of a career as a solo artist, and was working on TV themes and other commissions, when German label Tapete Records had contacted him. The label staff had enquired whether he had any material which they might release. This, and especially the relaxed nature of the request, led to his 2014 album The Breaks, and its debut single, "Santa Fe Skyway".

In October 2017, Martin released New Shapes of Life on Tapete Records. The third album released under his name and his second with Tapete Records.

When The Boo Radleys reformed he declined to be involved, noting:

"I didn’t know there was a reunion until they’d already decided to do it. Sice had told me they were recording but that it wasn’t a reunion (I already knew they were in the studio because it had been on Twitter). He was keen for us all to meet up and talk it through, but I didn’t see what there was to talk about. This was after they’d made the album and got themselves a label and manager. Sice asked if I minded if he used the name and I told him that I’d gone 20 years without using it and I didn’t see why he should start now so, yes, I very much minded. Weeks later he got back in touch and told me he was doing it anyway. The other two have never contacted me. I’ve heard bits of the record, it’s not really my thing."

== Personal life ==
In the early 2000s he was living in North London with his French wife, Hildy. At the start of the next decade he was living in Cardiff and married to Mary Wycherley, where their tweets on the birth of their daughter was covered in a BBC news story.

Carr was diagnosed with attention deficit hyperactivity disorder and autism as an adult.

In a 2021 interview he revealed he had a breakdown recording his 2017 album New Shapes of Life.

== bravecaptain discography ==
=== Albums ===
- Fingertip Saint Sessions Vol 1 (14 August 2000)
- Go With Yourself (Fingertip Saint Sessions Vol II) (9 October 2000)
- Nothing Lives Long, He Sang, Only The Earth and The Mountains (2001)
- Advertisements For Myself (14 October 2002)
- All Watched Over By Machines of Loving Grace (2 August 2004)
- allonewordsmallbee (December 2004)
- Distractions (January 2006)

=== Singles ===
- Better Living Through Reckless Experimentation (single) (19 March 2001)
- Corporation Man (single) (6 April 2001)
- Captain America (single) (20 August 2001)
- I Am a Lion (single) (29 November 2003)
- Distractions (30 January 2006)

== Solo discography ==
=== Albums ===
- Ye Gods (and Little Fishes) (13 July 2009)
- The Breaks (26 September 2014)
- New Shapes of Life (27 October 2017)
- The Canton Hours (9 August 2025 on Bandcamp)

=== Singles and EPs ===
- Eating the Afterlife (EP) (28 June 2004)
- Sailor/I Will Build a Road (single) (28 May 2012)
- Santa Fe Skyway (single) (31 August 2014)
- Gold Lift (single) (30 March 2017)
- Future Reflections (single) (11 August 2017)
- Three Studies of a Male Back (single) (January 2018)
