= A Place for Us to Dream =

Greatest hits album by Placebo
- Released: 7 October 2016
- Recorded: 1994–2016
- Genre: Alternative rock
- Label: Rise

Placebo chronology
MTV Unplugged (2015)	A Place for Us to Dream (2016)	Life's What You Make It (2016)

A Place for Us to Dream is a compilation album by the English alternative rock band Placebo. It was released on 7 October 2016, as part of the band's twentieth anniversary celebrations. It consists of 36 tracks, including songs off albums, single versions, radio edits, live performances and redux editions of previously released songs, as well as the 2016 single "Jesus' Son". The compilation includes all Placebo songs that have been released as singles, apart from "Burger Queen Français", "Twenty Years" and "The Never-Ending Why".

"A place for us to dream" is a lyric from the song "Narcoleptic" on Placebo's third album, Black Market Music. The album cover is an iconic photo taken during the 2011 Vancouver Stanley Cup riot.

== Release ==
A Place for Us to Dream was announced on 4 August 2016 on Placebo's official website. The album was released on limited edition deluxe box set pink vinyl, limited edition deluxe box set black vinyl, double CD and digital download.

== Track listing ==
CD 1
No.	Title	Length
1.	"Pure Morning" (radio edit)	3:58
2.	"Jesus' Son" (radio edit)	3:19
3.	"Come Home"	5:09
4.	"Every You Every Me" (single version)	3:34
5.	"Too Many Friends"	3:34
6.	"Nancy Boy" (radio edit)	3:19
7.	"36 Degrees" (2016 version)	4:53
8.	"Taste in Men" (radio edit)	4:00
9.	"The Bitter End"	3:11
10.	"Without You I'm Nothing" (featuring David Bowie; single version)	4:11
11.	"English Summer Rain" (single version)	3:10
12.	"Breathe Underwater" (slow)	5:28
13.	"Soulmates"	3:06
14.	"Meds" (featuring Alison Mosshart; single version)	2:54
15.	"Bright Lights" (single version)	3:31
16.	"Song to Say Goodbye" (radio edit)	3:53
17.	"Infra-Red"	3:15
18.	"Running Up That Hill" (Kate Bush cover)	5:10

CD 2
No.	Title	Length
1.	"B3" (radio edit)	3:53
2.	"For What It's Worth"	2:51
3.	"Teenage Angst"	2:41
4.	"You Don't Care About Us" (radio edit)	3:51
5.	"Ashtray Heart"	3:38
6.	"Broken Promise" (featuring Michael Stipe)	4:13
7.	"Slave to the Wage" (radio edit)	3:46
8.	"Bruise Pristine" (radio edit)	3:00
9.	"This Picture"	3:33
10.	"Protège-moi"	3:15
11.	"Because I Want You" (redux)	4:19
12.	"Black-Eyed"	3:47
13.	"Lazarus"	3:24
14.	"I Know" (2008 version)	5:03
15.	"A Million Little Pieces" (radio edit)	3:45
16.	"Special Needs" (radio edit)	3:29
17.	"Special K"	3:49
18.	"Loud Like Love" (radio edit)	4:26

CD 3 -Japan Bonus Disc- Live at Akasaka Blitz, Tokyo, Japan - March 6th, 2010
No.	Title	Length
1.	"For What It's Worth"	3:01
2.	"Battle For The Sun"	5:45
3.	"Devil In The Details"	4:35
4.	"Speak In Tongues"	4:26
5.	"Special Needs"	4:30
6.	"Every You Every Me"	4:11
7.	"Meds"	3:40
8.	"Song to Say Goodbye"	3:42
9.	"Follow The Cops Back Home"	5:11
10.	"Special K"	3:35
11.	"Infra-Red"	4:28
12.	"The Bitter End"	3:28

== Charts ==
Chart (2016)	Peak position
Austrian Albums (Ö3 Austria)	28
Belgian Albums (Ultratop Flanders)	28
Belgian Albums (Ultratop Wallonia)	18
French Albums (SNEP)	29
German Albums (Offizielle Top 100)	10
Italian Albums (FIMI)	17
New Zealand Heatseekers Albums (RMNZ)	8
Scottish Albums (Official Charts)	18
Swiss Albums (Schweizer Hitparade)	16
UK Albums (Official Charts)	21

== Certifications ==
Region	Certification	Certified units/sales
United Kingdom (BPI)	Gold	100,000^{‡}
^{‡} Sales+streaming figures based on certification alone.
