= 36 Degrees =

Single by Placebo

from the album Placebo
- Released: 27 May 1996
- Genre: Alternative rock, pop punk
- Label: Virgin
- Songwriters: Placebo (Stefan Olsdal, Brian Molko and Robert Schultzberg)
- Producer: Brad Wood

Placebo singles chronology
"Come Home" (1996)	"36 Degrees" (1996)	"Teenage Angst" (1996)

"36 Degrees" is a song by British alternative rock band Placebo, released as the second single from their eponymous debut album. It reached number 80 in the UK Singles Chart.

== Song meaning ==
There are various suggestions as to the meaning of the song, such as it relates to sexual preferences or it is to do with dying. Some state "36 Degrees" refers to the average human body temperature being generally accepted as 37 °C (99 °F), and that the narrator is dying, or losing the will to live after being dumped by a partner. Singer Brian Molko is stated to have said before a performance "The average body temperature is 37 degrees. This is a song called 36 Degrees", further adding to the speculation. However, the term "36 degrees" also means two people who are not getting on in urban slang; therefore the idea of the song being written for a break-up could well be true. The other numbers mentioned have been said to just be random, as "they just seemed to fit" according to Molko.

== Music video ==
The music video, directed by Chris Cunningham, was shot primarily in a scuba diving pool and shows band members performing the song underwater. Some scenes were shot in a swamp-like area and show Brian Molko singing the lyrics with just his head above the surface of the water. Later band members revealed that this video was extremely hard to shoot and they would never make one underwater again.

== Live performance history ==
The song was part of the band's repertoire prior to the release of their debut album and it was a regular until the Sleeping with Ghosts tour. A re-worked version, performed at a much slower tempo, was debuted at the band's 10th anniversary show at Wembley Arena in 2004. This version was played during the band's 2005 South American tour and the early legs of the Meds tour. It was also released as a B-side to the "Because I Want You" and "Song to Say Goodbye" singles under the title "36 Degrees 2005". It continues to be performed in various arrangements into 2016.

Reviews of the song's performance during Placebo's MTV Unplugged concert stated that "'36 Degrees' (written by a 19-year-old Stefan and a 21-year-old Brian) becomes softer but it’s no less powerful as you’re drawn further into the lyrics of this song" and "In this setting ["36 Degrees"] becomes unexpectedly lush, underpinned by disarmingly subtle waves of piano and strings".

== Track listing ==
No.	Title	Length
1.	"36 Degrees"
2.	"Dark Globe (Syd Barrett cover)"
3.	"Hare Krishna"
