= Never Let Me Go (Placebo album) =

Studio album by Placebo
- Released: 25 March 2022
- Recorded: 2019–2021
- Genre: Alternative rock
- Length: 57:35
- Label: So Recordings; Elevator Lady; Rise
- Producer: Adam Noble; Placebo

Placebo chronology
Life's What You Make It (2016)	Never Let Me Go (2022)

Singles from Never Let Me Go
- 1. "Beautiful James" Released: 16 September 2021; 2. "Surrounded by Spies" Released: 9 November 2021; 3. "Try Better Next Time" Released: 11 January 2022; 4. "Happy Birthday in the Sky" Released: 4 March 2022

Professional ratings
Aggregate scores
Source	Rating
AnyDecentMusic?	7.6/10
Metacritic	78/100
Review scores
Source	Rating
AllMusic	4/5 stars
The Arts Desk	4/5 stars
Contactmusic.com	4/5 stars
DIY	4/5 stars
Gigwise	7/10 stars
The Independent	4/5 stars
Kerrang!	4/5
Louder	4/5 stars
NME	4/5 stars
Sputnikmusic	4.3/5

Never Let Me Go is the eighth studio album by British alternative rock band Placebo, recorded between 2019 and 2021 and released on 25 March 2022. The album was made available for pre-order on 9 November 2021.

It is Placebo's first studio album in over eight years, following 2013's Loud Like Love. It is also their first album to be recorded as a duo, following the departure of drummer Steve Forrest in 2015. Concurrent with the album announcement, on 4 November 2021, the band revealed a 2022 headline tour of Europe and the United Kingdom.

The first single from the album was "Beautiful James", released on 16 September 2021. The second single, "Surrounded by Spies", was released on 9 November 2021. The third single, "Try Better Next Time" was released on 11 January 2022. The fourth and final single, "Happy Birthday in the Sky", was released on 4 March 2022.

The album achieved strong chart performance, peaking at # 1 in the UK Indie Chart, # 1 in the Austrian, Dutch, and German album charts, and # 3 in the UK Albums Chart.

== Critical reception ==
Never Let Me Go received positive reviews. At Metacritic, which assigns a normalised rating out of 100 to reviews from mainstream critics, the album received an average score of 78, which indicates "generally favorable reviews", based on 13 reviews. NME gave the album 4 stars, stating it was a return to form for the band, and their best since 2006's Meds. In Under The Radar, Jimi Arundell commented "It’s good to hear that they’re still around and continuing to push themselves, though perhaps just not far enough"

== Track listing ==
All tracks are written by Brian Molko and Stefan Olsdal, except where noted.

Never Let Me Go track listing
No.	Title	Writer(s)	Length
1.	"Forever Chemicals"	Molko; Olsdal; Steve Ludwin	5:09
2.	"Beautiful James"		4:08
3.	"Hugz"		3:51
4.	"Happy Birthday in the Sky"		5:09
5.	"The Prodigal"		4:46
6.	"Surrounded by Spies"		5:14
7.	"Try Better Next Time"		3:07
8.	"Sad White Reggae"		3:25
9.	"Twin Demons"		3:58
10.	"Chemtrails"		4:31
11.	"This Is What You Wanted"		4:11
12.	"Went Missing"		5:05
13.	"Fix Yourself"	Molko; Olsdal; William Lloyd	5:01
Total length:			57:35

Never Let Me Go Deluxe Digital Album track listing
No.	Title	Length
14.	"Surrounded by Spies" (Timo Maas and Andre Winter Smack the Spies Extended Remix)	7:35
15.	"Surrounded by Spies" (Richard Norris Bag on the Platform Mix)	6:33
16.	"This Is What You Wanted" (Digital 21 & Stefan Olsdal Remix)	5:34
17.	"Try Better Next Time" (live)	3:02
Total length:		80:19

== Personnel ==
Placebo

- Brian Molko – vocals, electric guitar, drum machine, keyboards, loops, percussion, synthesizer, whip, production, creative direction
- Stefan Olsdal – electric bass, electric guitar, keyboards, piano, synthesizer, background vocals, production, engineering

Additional personnel

- Adam Noble – production, mixing, engineering (all tracks); programming (1, 3–12)
- William Lloyd – engineering (all tracks), programming (4–6, 8, 11, 12), keyboard programming (10)
- Robin Schmidt – mastering
- Matthew Lunn – drums (1, 3, 8, 9)
- Pietro Garrone – drums (1–7, 10–12)
- Cody Jet Molko – background vocals (7)
- Phil Lee – creative direction, design
- Rachel Bungey – design
- Stuart Ford – design
- Mads Perch – band photo

== Charts ==
=== Weekly charts ===
Weekly chart performance for Never Let Me Go
Chart (2022)	Peak position
Australian Albums (ARIA)	10
Austrian Albums (Ö3 Austria)	1
French Albums (SNEP)	2
Belgian Albums (Ultratop Flanders)	4
Belgian Albums (Ultratop Wallonia)	1
Czech Albums (ČNS IFPI)	74
Dutch Albums (Album Top 100)	1
Finnish Albums (Suomen virallinen lista)	32
German Albums (Offizielle Top 100)	1
Hungarian Albums (MAHASZ)	7
Irish Albums (Official Charts)	27
Italian Albums (FIMI)	8
New Zealand Albums (RMNZ)	39
Polish Albums (ZPAV)	10
Scottish Albums (Official Charts)	3
Spanish Albums (PROMUSICAE)	13
Swedish Albums (Sverigetopplistan)	55
Swiss Albums (Schweizer Hitparade)	1
UK Albums (Official Charts)	3
UK Independent Albums (Official Charts)	1

=== Year-end charts ===
Year-end chart performance for Never Let Me Go
Chart (2022)	Position
Belgian Albums (Ultratop Flanders)	189
Belgian Albums (Ultratop Wallonia)	39
French Albums (SNEP)	147
German Albums (Offizielle Top 100)	45
Swiss Albums (Schweizer Hitparade)	81
