= Every You Every Me =

1999 single by Placebo

Single by Placebo

from the album Without You I'm Nothing
- Released: 25 January 1999
- Recorded: Early 1998
- Studio: Real World (Box, Wiltshire, UK)
- Genre: Alternative rock
- Length: 3:35
- Label: Elevator Music; Hut; Virgin
- Songwriters: Charles Drummond; Steve Hewitt; Brian Molko; Stefan Olsdal
- Producer: Steve Osborne

Placebo singles chronology
"You Don't Care About Us" (1998)	"Every You Every Me" (1999)	"Without You I'm Nothing" (1999)

CD2

Music video
- "Every You Every Me" on YouTube

"Every You Every Me" is a song by British alternative rock band Placebo, released as the third single from their second album, Without You I'm Nothing, on 25 January 1999. It was released as a 2-CD set and on cassette, but promotional copies on 12-inch vinyl exist. The single charted at number 46 in Australia, number 99 in Germany, and number 11 on the UK Singles Chart. There are two versions of the video, both filmed live at London's Brixton Academy; one includes clips from the film Cruel Intentions. An alternative video taking place at a casino was filmed in November 1998 but would not be released until 18 years later as part of the promotion for A Place for Us to Dream.

It was voted from a poll of 500,000 votes to be ranked number 83 on the list of the Hottest 100 of All Time in July 2009, conducted by Australian radio station Triple J. Croatian metal band Ashes You Leave covered "Every You Every Me" on their 2009 album Songs of the Lost. and in 2017, Lisa Mitchell covered the song on her EP When They Play That Song. The song was featured on the Cruel Intentions soundtrack.

== Background ==
Along with the rest of the album (apart from "Pure Morning"), "Every You Every Me" was recorded in early 1998 at Real World Studios with Steve Osborne. When asked who it was about, Brian Molko replied with "Who's it about? I'm not really too sure just yet. I think it's about a lot of people. Probably anybody... everybody who's had the displeasure of sleeping with me." About his choice to include it in the Cruel Intentions soundtrack, Molko said that he "studied drama, I know the original (Dangerous Liaisons) and we watched it on the tour bus when they wanted to use our song. I said: 'If he doesn't die in the end, if it's a happy ending, we don't do it.' It's quite perverted and manipulative, so the theme of the song fits in quite well."

== Track listings ==
UK CD1 and cassette single; European CD single

1. "Every You Every Me" (single mix)
2. "Nancy Boy" (Blue Amazon mix)
3. "Every You Every Me" (Infected by the Scourge of the Earth mix)

UK CD2

1. "Every You Every Me" (album version)
2. "Every You Every Me" (Sneaker Pimps version)
3. "Every You Every Me" (Brothers in Rhythm Glam Club mix)

Australian CD single

1. "Every You Every Me" (single mix)
2. "Every You Every Me" (Sneaker Pimps version)
3. "Every You Every Me" (Infected by the Scourge of the Earth mix)
4. "Pure Morning" (Les Rythmes Digitales remix)

== Charts ==
Chart (1999)	Peak position
Australia (ARIA)	46
Germany (GfK)	99
Iceland (Íslenski Listinn Topp 40)	13
Scotland Singles (OCC)	12
UK Singles (OCC)	11
UK Airplay (Music Week)	44

== Certifications ==
Region	Certification	Certified units/sales
United Kingdom (BPI)	Gold	400,000^{‡}
^{‡} Sales+streaming figures based on certification alone.

== Release history ==
Region	Date	Format(s)	Label(s)	Ref.
United Kingdom	25 January 1999	CD; cassette	Elevator Music; Hut; Virgin	
United States	30 March 1999	Alternative radio	Elevator Music; Hut; Virgin	
