= Bruise Pristine =

- 1997 cover

Single by Placebo

from the album Placebo
- B-side: "Then the Clouds Will Open for Me", "Bruise Pristine (1" Punch Mix)"
- Released: 13 November 1995
- Recorded: 1995
- Genre: Alternative rock
- Length: 3:01
- Label: Fierce Panda; Virgin
- Songwriters: Placebo (Stefan Olsdal, Brian Molko and Robert Schultzberg)
- Producer: Brad Wood

Placebo singles chronology
"Bruise Pristine" (1995)	"Come Home" (1996)
"Nancy Boy" (1997)	"Bruise Pristine" (1997)	"Pure Morning" (1998)

Alternate cover
- 1995 split single cover

"Bruise Pristine" is a song by English alternative rock band Placebo, released in its original version as a split single with the band Soup by record label Fierce Panda in November 1995. It was re-recorded for the band's 1996 self-titled debut album, and this version was released in May 1997 as the fifth and final single from the album.

== Composition ==
The song is a heavy riff-based track and is notable for its "behind the bridge" guitar solo. The guitars feature F-A-D-G-C-C tuning. It opens with a natural harmonics riff on the 12th fret and proceeds with an overdriven riff that is played during the verses. During the chorus there is a chromatic power chord progression from F to G.

There are four official versions of the song that have been released: the 1995 single version, the album track, the radio edit and the 2026 RE-CREATED version. The radio edit is intended to be more radio-friendly; after the intro it cuts directly to the vocal verse and the solo is cut short.

== Release ==
"Bruise Pristine" was originally released on record label Fierce Panda as a split seven-inch single with Soup in October 1995. This version is different from the one which later appeared on their 1996 debut album. The 1995 single version was later featured on the Fierce Panda compilation Nings and Roundabouts.

The song was released on 12 May 1997 by record label Virgin as the fifth and final single from Placebo. It was released on 7" vinyl, cassette and CD. The single charted at number 14 in the UK Singles Chart. A music video was made to promote the single.

In 2026, the song was remastered as part of Placebo RE-CREATED, a project celebrating the 30th anniversary of the original album. It was released as a single digitally on 27 March 2026.

== Track listing ==
=== 1995 7-inch single ===
Fierce Side

1. Placebo – "Bruise Pristine"

Panda Side

1. Soup – "m.e.l.t.d.o.w.n."

=== 1997 single ===
CD 1 and cassette

1. "Bruise Pristine (Radio Edit)"
2. "Then the Clouds Will Open for Me"
3. "Bruise Pristine (1" Punch Mix)"

CD 2

1. "Bruise Pristine"
2. "Waiting for the Son of Man"
3. "Bruise Pristine (Lionrock Mix)"

7" vinyl

1. "Bruise Pristine (Radio Edit)" – 3:01
2. "Bruise Pristine (1" Punch Mix)" – 4:38

=== 2026 single ===
Digital

1. "Bruise Pristine (RE:CREATED VERSION) " – 3:36

== Charts ==
Chart (1997)	Peak position
UK Singles Chart	14

== Release history ==
Region	Date	Format(s)
UK	13 November 1995	split 7-inch
UK	12 May 1997	7-inch single, CD, cassette
