= Jesus' Son (song) =

Single by Placebo

from the album A Place for Us to Dream
- Released: 19 August 2016
- Genre: Alternative rock
- Length: 3:19
- Label: Rise
- Songwriter(s): Brian Molko and Stefan Olsdal

Placebo singles chronology
"A Million Little Pieces" (2014)	"Jesus' Son" (2016)	"Beautiful James" (2021)

"Jesus' Son" is a song by the English alternative rock band Placebo. It was released as a single on 19 August 2016, and was featured in their 2016 EP Life's What You Make It as well as the band's compilation album A Place for Us to Dream later that year.

== Content ==
The single's cover art features Brian Molko's son, Cody, wearing an oxygen mask.

PopMatters called the song "an anthem for living life and doing it without fear".

== Release and reception ==
The single was released on 7" vinyl, with Placebo's cover of Talk Talk's "Life's What You Make It" as a double A-side.

PopMatters gave the single a 5.73/10 grade, with one reviewer writing: "If you're looking for a moment of spiritual comfort in a chaotic year, Placebo's your band."

== Track listing ==
All tracks are written by Placebo (Brian Molko and Stefan Olsdal), except as noted

Double A-side 7" vinyl
No.	Title	Length
1.	"Jesus' Son"
2.	"Life's What You Make It" (Talk Talk cover)
