= Jesus' Son =

Jesus' Son may refer to:

- Jesus' Son (short story collection), a 1992 collection of short fiction by Denis Johnson
- Jesus' Son (film), a 1999 film based on Johnson's book
- "Jesus' Son" (song), a 2016 song by Placebo
