= Bright Lights (Placebo song) =

Single by Placebo

from the album Battle for the Sun
- B-side: "The Never-Ending Why" (SFR Live)
- Released: 8 February 2010
- Recorded: 2008
- Genre: Alternative rock
- Label: PIAS
- Songwriters: Steven Forrest, William Patrick Lloyd, Brian Molko and Stefan Olsdal
- Producer: David Bottrill

Placebo singles chronology
"Ashtray Heart" (2009)	"Bright Lights" (2010)	"Too Many Friends" (2013)

"Bright Lights" is the fourth official single from Placebo's sixth studio album, Battle for the Sun, released on 8 February 2010 as a digital download or CD single (limited to France and Germany). The new single version was mixed by Dave Bascombe, while the album version was mixed by Alan Moulder. The new single version would later be included in the Battle for the Sun: Redux Edition.

After Placebo released their single, Bright Lights saw coverage on AOL, Drowned in Sound, Indie London and Metro Newspaper.

== Track listing ==
CD single (France/Germany only)

1. "Bright Lights" (single version)
2. "The Never-Ending Why" (SFR live)
3. "Bright Lights" (Randomer Remix-Dub)

Digital download bundle

1. "Bright Lights" (single version)
2. "Bright Lights" (album version)
3. "The Never-Ending Why" (SFR live)
4. "Bright Lights" (Randomer Remix-Dub)

iTunes deluxe bundle

1. "Bright Lights" (single version)
2. "Bright Lights" (album version)
3. "The Never-Ending Why" (SFR live)
4. "Bright Lights" (Randomer Remix-Dub)
5. "Bright Lights" (video)

== Charts ==
Chart	Peak position
German Singles Chart	62
French Singles Chart	92
