= Without You I'm Nothing (song) =

Single by Placebo featuring David Bowie

from the album Without You I'm Nothing
- B-side: Remixes of "Without You I'm Nothing,"
- Released: 16 August 1998
- Genre: Alternative rock
- Length: 4:16 (Single Mix); 4:08 (Album version)
- Label: Virgin
- Songwriters: Placebo (Steve Hewitt, Brian Molko and Stefan Olsdal)
- Producer: Steve Osborne

Placebo singles chronology
| "Every You Every Me" (1998) | "Without You I'm Nothing" (1998) | "Burger Queen Français" (1998) |

David Bowie singles chronology
| "I Can't Read" (1997) | "Without You I'm Nothing" (1998) | "Thursday's Child" (1999) |

"Without You I'm Nothing" is a 1998 single by British alternative rock band Placebo. The title track of their second album, the single version featured additional vocals by David Bowie. The single reached number 79 on the French Singles Chart, and number 52 on the Australian ARIA singles chart.

== Use in media ==
This song was also featured in an episode of the drama television series Queer as Folk and the Mexican movie Violanchelo.

A parody of the song reoccurs in several episodes of the animated series The Amazing World of Gumball, as confirmed by show creator Ben Bocquelet.

== Live performance history ==
The song was a staple of the band's set list from the Without You I'm Nothing tour to the Sleeping with Ghosts tour. It was also performed during the latter legs of the Meds tour. The song returned to live shows during the band's UK tour in April 2012, but was not performed during the Summer leg of the tour. It was also featured in the 2016 arena tour with accompanying visuals of Bowie working with the band to produce the track.

== Track listing ==
Enhanced CD (UK)

1. "Without You I'm Nothing" (Single Mix) - 4:16
2. "Without You I'm Nothing" (UNKLE mix) - 5:08
3. "Without You I'm Nothing" (Flexirol mix) - 9:26
4. "Without You I'm Nothing" (BIR mix) - 10:53

CD (Europe)

1. "Without You I'm Nothing" (Single Mix) - 4:16
2. "Without You I'm Nothing" (UNKLE mix) - 5:08

12" (UK)

1. "Without You I'm Nothing" (UNKLE mix) - 5:08
2. "Without You I'm Nothing" (Flexirol mix) - 9:26
3. "Without You I'm Nothing" (BIR mix) - 10:53

== Chart performance ==
| Chart (1999) | Peak position |
|---|---|
| Australia (ARIA) | 52 |
| France (SNEP) | 79 |
| Italy (Musica e dischi) | 41 |
| Scotland (OCC) | 22 |
