= Teenage Angst =

Teenage Angst may refer to:

- Teenage angst, an intense feeling of fear or anxiety
- "Teenage Angst", 1996 song by the band Placebo.
- "Teenage Angst", a song on the album Beige by The Arrogant Worms
