= Life's What You Make It (EP) =

EP by Placebo
- Released: 7 October 2016
- Genre: Alternative rock

Placebo chronology
A Place for Us to Dream (2016)	Life's What You Make It (2016)	Never Let Me Go (2022)

Life's What You Make It is an EP by the English alternative rock band Placebo, released on 7 October 2016. It includes three cover songs (Talk Talk's "Life's What You Make It", Rowland S. Howard's "Autoluminescent" and Freak Power's "Song #6"), as well as the 2016 single "Jesus' Son" and two live recordings of "Twenty Years".

== Background ==
Singer Brian Molko told The Independent that Placebo decided to cover "Life's What You Make It" because it's a 1980s song that the band still enjoys. In an interview with NME, he stated: "Our last single 'Jesus Son' and the Talk Talk cover 'Life Is What You Make It' are possibly two of the most commercial tracks that we've ever done. What we have a tendency to do it react allergically against what we’ve just done, so it's highly likely that the next thing we do will be something akin to career suicide."

A music video, directed by Sasha Rainbow, was released in June 2017. It was filmed at Agbogbloshie in Accra, Ghana, the site of one of the world's largest electronic waste dumps. Despite the film's setting, Molko explained: "The video is not anti-technology. It is about the triumph of the human spirit in the face of adversity that has not been chosen."

== Release ==
The EP was released on 12" black vinyl, 12" springtime green vinyl and digital download.

== Track listing ==
All tracks are written by Placebo (Brian Molko and Stefan Olsdal), except as noted.

Vinyl side A
No.	Title	Writer(s)	Length
1.	"Life's What You Make It" (Talk Talk cover)	Mark Hollis	5:18
2.	"Jesus' Son"		3:37
3.	"Twenty Years" (live at Europavox Festival 2015)		4:36

Vinyl side B
No.	Title	Writer(s)	Length
1.	"Autoluminescent" (Rowland S. Howard cover)	Rowland S. Howard	3:40
2.	"Twenty Years" (piano version live at Evening Urgant, Moscow 2016)		4:22
3.	"Song #6" (Freak Power cover)	Ashley Slater	4:27

== Charts ==
Chart (2016)	Peak position
Belgian Albums (Ultratop Flanders)	153
Belgian Albums (Ultratop Wallonia)	66
