= Placebo (Placebo album) =

Studio album by Placebo
- Released: 17 June 1996
- Recorded: March 1996
- Studios: Westland Studios, Dublin, Ireland
- Genre: Alternative rock
- Length: 60:27
- Labels: Hut; Elevator Music; Virgin
- Producer: Brad Wood

Placebo chronology
Placebo (1996)	Without You I'm Nothing (1998)

Singles from Placebo
- 1. "Come Home" Released: 5 February 1996; 2. "36 Degrees" Released: 27 May 1996; 3. "Teenage Angst" Released: 16 September 1996; 4. "Nancy Boy" Released: 20 January 1997; 5. "Bruise Pristine" Released: 12 May 1997

Placebo is the debut studio album by English alternative rock band Placebo. It was released on 17 June 1996 by Virgin Records. It is the only album recorded with drummer Robert Schultzberg before his departure from the group.

The album was a commercial success in the UK, reaching number 5 in the UK Albums Chart. It spawned five singles, including "Nancy Boy" and "36 Degrees". The album was remastered and reissued in 2006 for its tenth anniversary, including demos and a DVD featuring live performances and music videos from the album.

On 11 April 2026, the band announced a reissue, or "remake", of the album: Placebo Re:created, which was released on 19 June. Simultaneously, with the announcement, the single "Bruise Pristine Re:cut" was released.

== Background and recording ==
Placebo were formed in 1994 with the partnering of Brian Molko (vocals, guitar) and Stefan Olsdal (guitar, bass). At the time, Olsdal was taking guitar lessons and was on his way home when he met Molko at the South Kensington tube station. Molko, observing that Olsdal had a guitar strapped to his back, invited Olsdal to watch him perform at a local bar. On the strength of Molko's performance, Olsdal decided that the two of them should start a band.

The two initially formed Ashtray Heart, a lo-fi duo, playing mostly on children's toy instruments. The duo needed a drummer, and although Steve Hewitt―who would play later with Placebo―was their first choice, he was working with London-based band Breed at the time. This led Robert Schultzberg to assume the position of drummer. Schultzberg had known Olsdal from boarding school in Sigtuna, Sweden where they had played together in a band.

The newly formed band released the single "Come Home" on Deceptive Records in February 1996. This led to signing a contract with Hut Records and the band began to work on their debut album. Placebo was recorded in Dublin at Westland Studios over a period of two weeks, after which the band returned to London to mix the album.

After an argument in August 1996 shortly before their first television appearance, Molko decided that it would be best for the band if Schultzberg left. However, Schultzberg suggested playing together until they finished the promotion for the album, which the rest of band accepted. Before going on stage for their first show in the state of New York, Olsdal informed Schultzberg that he would not perform on the tour in Germany that was following the US tour. Schultzberg played two more shows with the band in Paris after the US tour, the last of which was a performance at "Nulle Part Aillleurs". Molko has said that he was "tired of being the focus of Robert's rages against the world". Schultzberg left the band in September 1996 and was replaced by Hewitt.

== Composition ==
=== Lyrics and themes ===
Many of the songs on Placebo were written in 1995. Regarding the album's opening track "Come Home", Molko called it "punk pop for postponed suicides". "Teenage Angst" is about the emotions you feel as a teenager and want to have everything kept to yourself and create your own world, while Molko says "Bionic" is "about a robot fuck".

The meaning of the album's fourth song "36 Degrees", either sexual preference or death, has caused debate among fans. Molko has stated the title is a play on words regarding the expression "cold blooded", as the average human body temperature is 37 °C (99 °F). Molko has stated the song's inspiration came from his fascination with skin texture and the warmth of other human bodies; moreover, he originally intended to call the album Body Politic.

"Hang on to Your IQ" is about self-deprecation regarding intelligence. Molko has stated it is the most "story-like" song on the album: "The person [in the song] is having a breakdown about every physical and emotional thing they could feel."

"Nancy Boy" differs from previous songs' themes about drugs, sex, gender confusion and bisexuality.

The track "Lady of the Flowers" is influenced by Jean Genet's debut novel Our Lady of the Flowers which Genet wrote for his own entertainment whilst in prison.

Molko states the song "Swallow" was inspired by an acid trip Molko and Olsdal had, saying it was never written in a state of reality. Initial pressings of the CD included "H.K. Farewell" as a hidden track which began playing approximately 10 minutes after the end of "Swallow". Certain versions of the album replaced the album version of "Nancy Boy" with the single version, known as "Nancy Boy (Sex Mix)". The band debated whether or not to put "Slackerbitch" on the record, but eventually decided against it; "Slackerbitch" was included on the 2006 reissue.

Speaking to Kerrang! in June 2009, Brian Molko remembered:

We wrote most of the album in a council flat in Deptford. The way we sounded and looked was a reaction against the place. But also a lot of our cross-dressing and transvestism was a political statement against the music scene at the time which was very laddish and macho. We wanted to stand up and be counted. There's no better way to do that than by putting a bunch of slap on, wearing a skirt and f***ing with people's heads. People hated us for it and I adored that. Not getting a reaction was an anathema to me at the time. When I look back at the album, I see naivety, missed opportunities and mistakes. But you can get your knickers in a twist about it or you can just accept they're part of you. I view "Nancy Boy" in a way I imagine Radiohead look at "Creep". I just wish the song that propelled us into the limelight had been a little bit better written. It's the lyrics that make me cringe most. They're me trying to find my feet.

== Packaging ==
On 23 June 2012, it emerged that the boy photographed for the album cover, David Fox (shown wearing a red jumper and pulling his face downward), was threatening to sue the band for "ruining" his life. His cousin Saul Fletcher had taken the photo. Fox claims he was quite popular at the time and that when the album came out everyone bullied him.

The inserts for the album feature another picture of the boy on the cover and a very small picture of the band. The rest of it is green or blue paper, with no lyrics. The reason for this is that Molko did not want people to focus on the liner, but rather the music itself.

== Release ==
Placebo was released on 17 June 1996 in the UK on Elevator Music/Hut Records and 9 July in the US on Caroline Records on CD, cassette and vinyl. It reached number 5 in the UK Albums Chart, staying there for 13 weeks, and at number 50 in France. The album went gold in the UK on 1 May 1997, and platinum on 22 July 2013. It was certified double gold in France in 2003.

Prior to the release of Placebo, several singles were released to promote the album: "Bruise Pristine", "Come Home" and "36 Degrees". Placebo released two more singles after the release of the album: "Teenage Angst" and "Nancy Boy". "Nancy Boy" was a hit and reached number 4 in the UK Singles Chart. Music videos were filmed for all of the singles.

=== 2026 reissue ===
On 11 April 2026, the band announced a reissue, or "remake", of the album, which is titled Placebo Re:created. It was released on 19 June. The single "Bruise Pristine RE:CUT" was released at the same time as the announcement.

== Reception ==
Professional ratings
Review scores
Source	Rating
AllMusic	3/5 stars
The Guardian	3/5 stars
NME	8/10
Q	4/5 stars
Select	3/5

NME called the album "dangerous, mysterious and utterly addictive". Trouser Press wrote that it "establishes the trio as a strong contender in the Britpop scene."

In his retrospective review, Nitsuh Abebe of AllMusic wrote "[the band] brings together various influences – the epic, noisy 'Chicago sound", late-'70s prog rock and late-'80s 'college rock' – but boils them down into fairly conventional, guitar-heavy melodrama, with the sort of opaque and angst-ridden lyrics usually found in that genre. That's not to say that Placebo's sound is boring; churning guitars and direct, heavy basslines give the album a good deal of strength, and Molko is able to write moving, gritty melodies and fairly clever lyrics."

== Legacy ==
In 1998 Q magazine readers voted Placebo at number 87 in its "All Time Top 100 Albums" list. Virgin placed it 154th in its "All-Time Top 1000 Albums" list. In 1999, Ned Raggett ranked the album at number 94 on his list of "The Top 136 or So Albums of the Nineties".

== Track listing ==
All tracks are written by Placebo (Stefan Olsdal, Brian Molko and Robert Schultzberg).

No.	Title	Length
1.	"Come Home"	5:09
2.	"Teenage Angst"	2:42
3.	"Bionic"	5:00
4.	"36 Degrees"	3:05
5.	"Hang On to Your IQ"	5:13
6.	"Nancy Boy"	3:48
7.	"I Know"	4:44
8.	"Bruise Pristine"	3:35
9.	"Lady of the Flowers"	4:47
10.	"Swallow" (ends at 4:54; hidden track "H. K. Farewell" starts at 14:51)	22:24
Total length:		60:27

Japanese edition bonus tracks
No.	Title	Length
11.	"Slacker Bitch"	3:23
12.	"Hug Bubble"	3:02

2006 reissue bonus tracks
No.	Title	Length
11.	"Paycheck" (demo)	2:59
12.	"Flesh Mechanic" (demo)	4:28
13.	"Drowning by Numbers"	2:57
14.	"Slackerbitch"	3:23
15.	"H K Farewell"	7:30

10th Anniversary Collector's Edition DVD

- "Come Home" (Alexandra Palace - 11.04.06) – 5:00
- "Teenage Angst" (The Big Breakfast - 29.08.96) – 2:39
- "Nancy Boy" (Top of the Pops - 31.01.97) – 3:09
- "Lady of the Flowers" (Glastonbury Festival - 27.06.98) – 5:41
- "Teenage Angst" (The White Room - 23.08.96) – 2:29
- "Bruise Pristine" (Top of the Pops - 23.05.97) – 2:33
- "36 Degrees" (Wembley Arena - 05.11.04) – 5:02
- "36 Degrees" (video) – 3:15
- "Teenage Angst" (video) – 2:40
- "Nancy Boy" (video) – 3:20
- "Bruise Pristine" (video) – 2:59
- "Soulmates Never Die Live in Paris Trailer" – 2:03

== Personnel ==
Placebo

- Brian Molko – electric and acoustic guitars, synthesizer, bass guitar, vocals
- Stefan Olsdal – bass guitar, electric and acoustic guitars, electric piano, synthesizer, piano
- Robert Schultzberg – drums, percussion, didgeridoo on "I Know"

Technical personnel

- Ed Kenehan – engineering (tracks 1–5, 7–10)
- Saul Fletcher – sleeve photography
- Teo Miller – engineering (track 6)
- Mary Scanlon – sleeve band photo photography
- Phil Vinall – production and mixing (track 6)
- Brad Wood – production (tracks 1–5, 7–10)

== Charts ==
Chart (1996–2012)	Peak position
European Top 100 Albums (Music & Media)	39
French Albums (SNEP)	50
Greek Albums (IFPI)	33
Scottish Albums (Official Charts)	8
UK Albums (Official Charts)	5

Chart performance for Placebo Re:created
Chart (2026)	Peak position
Australian Albums (ARIA)	40
Austrian Albums (Ö3 Austria)	6
Belgian Albums (Ultratop Flanders)	8
Belgian Albums (Ultratop Wallonia)	2
Dutch Albums (Album Top 100)	32
French Albums (SNEP)	36
French Rock & Metal Albums (SNEP)	1
German Albums (Offizielle Top 100)	2
German Rock & Metal Albums (Offizielle Top 100)	1
Hungarian Physical Albums (MAHASZ)	20
Irish Independent Albums (IRMA)	11
Spanish Albums (Promusicae)	64
Swedish Physical Albums (Sverigetopplistan)	8
UK Albums (Official Charts)	14
UK Independent Albums (Official Charts)	1

== Certifications and sales ==
Region	Certification	Certified units/sales
Belgium (BRMA)	Gold	25,000^{*}
France (SNEP)	2× Gold	200,000^{*}
United Kingdom (BPI)	Platinum	300,000^{*}
United States	—	30,000
Summaries
Worldwide	—	500,000
^{*} Sales figures based on certification alone.
