= Too Many Friends =

Single by Placebo

from the album Loud Like Love
- Released: 23 August 2013
- Recorded: RAK Studios, London
- Genre: Alternative rock
- Length: 3:35
- Label: Universal
- Songwriter(s): Steve Forrest, William Patrick Lloyd, Brian Molko and Stefan Olsdal
- Producer(s): Adam Noble

Placebo singles chronology
"Bright Lights" (2010)	"Too Many Friends" (2013)	"Loud Like Love" (2014)

"Too Many Friends" is a single by alternative rock band Placebo, the first single off of their seventh studio album Loud Like Love. The single was released on 8 July 2013, as a digital download but was actually released on 23 August 2013 in physical format as a limited edition CD and 7" single in Germany.

== Composition ==
The song deals with people on the internet and being far closer to friends on the internet, rather than off the computer. It is also about loneliness, which Placebo frontman Brian Molko said was the "modern version of, 'I’m sitting by the phone, waiting for you to call'".

== Music video ==
The band went to Los Angeles to make the music video with filmmaker Saman Kesh. American transgressive novelist Bret Easton Ellis provides a voiceover in the video as a narrator. The video, which premiered on YouTube, presents a "detective case" regarding a series of events occurring during a pool party.

== Track listing ==
Digital download

1. Too Many Friends – 3:35

iTunes EP

1. Too Many Friends – 3:35
2. Outro – 2:24
3. Too Many Friends (The Bloody Beetroots Remix) – 3:48

Limited CD and 7" single

1. Too Many Friends – 3:35
2. Outro – 2:24

== Charts ==
Chart (2013)	Peak position
French Singles Chart	31
German Singles Chart	14
Swiss Singles Chart	36
Belgian Singles Chart	26
Austrian Singles Chart	51
