= For What It's Worth (Placebo song) =

2009 single by Placebo

Single by Placebo

from the album Battle for the Sun
- B-side: "Wouldn't It Be Good"
- Released: 20 April 2009
- Recorded: 2008
- Genre: Alternative rock
- Length: 2:47
- Label: PIAS
- Songwriter(s): Steve Forrest; William Patrick Lloyd; Brian Molko; Stefan Olsdal
- Producer(s): David Bottrill

Placebo singles chronology
"Running Up that Hill" (2007)	"For What It's Worth" (2009)	"The Never-Ending Why" (2009)

"For What It's Worth" is the first official single from Placebo's sixth studio album, Battle for the Sun.

== Release ==
It was released on 20 April 2009, in a similar fashion to "Battle for the Sun"; it first played on Zane Lowe's BBC Radio 1 programme, and then was made available as a digital download from iTunes and emusic. The single featured a cover of Nik Kershaw's "Wouldn't It Be Good" as the B-side.

The video for the song was released on the following day, on the band's MySpace page. The single was released in the U.S. via iTunes and UK via emusic on 5 May 2009.

== Reception ==
The single debuted in the UK Singles Chart at No. 97 after it was released exclusively via iTunes. It was nominated for the Kerrang! Award for Best Single.

== Track listing ==
CD

1. "For What It's Worth"
2. "Wouldn't It Be Good" (Nik Kershaw cover)
3. "For What It's Worth" (demo version)

7"

1. "For What It's Worth"
2. "Wouldn't It Be Good" (Nik Kershaw cover)

== Charts ==
Chart performance for "For What It's Worth"
Chart (2009)	Peak position
Australia (ARIA)	88
Austria (Ö3 Austria Top 40)	24
Belgium (Ultratop 50 Flanders)	23
Belgium (Ultratip Bubbling Under Wallonia)	24
France (SNEP)	25
Germany (GfK)	34
Switzerland (Schweizer Hitparade)	33
UK Singles (OCC)	97
