= Teenage Angst (song) =

Single by Placebo

from the album Placebo
- Released: 16 September 1996
- Genre: Alternative rock
- Label: Virgin Records
- Songwriter(s): Stefan Olsdal; Brian Molko; Robert Schultzberg

Placebo singles chronology
"36 Degrees" (1996)	"Teenage Angst" (1996)	"Nancy Boy" (1997)

"Teenage Angst" is a song by British alternative rock band Placebo, released in 1996 as the third single from their self-titled debut album. It reached number 30 on the UK Singles Chart.

Reviews of the song offered that ""Teenage Angst" illustrates the "utter despair" motif even more convincingly, major key aside" and "Teenage Angst [...] [was] destined to become [a] single".

== Live performance history ==
The song was part of the band's repertoire prior to the release of their album and continues to be played live on occasion to the present. The song has been performed in notably different versions: the original version was performed up until 2000, with a piano-based version normally being played during the Black Market Music tour and the Meds and Battle for the Sun tours. During the Sleeping with Ghosts tour, the song was played with a hip-hop inspired drum beat. The song returned to the setlists towards the end of the Battle for the Sun tour in 2010, with a new arrangement. Yet another arrangement was performed during the Loud Like Love tour.

Older live performances of the song were made public by the band, as part of its 20th anniversary activities.

== Track listing ==
=== CD ===
1. "Teenage Angst"
2. "Been Smoking Too Long" (Nick Drake cover)
3. "Hug Bubble"

=== 7" Pt1 ===
1. "Teenage Angst"
2. "Been Smoking Too Long"
3. "Hug Bubble"

=== 7" Pt2 ===
1. "Teenage Angst" (Amsterdam V.P.R.O. Session)
2. "Flesh Mechanic" (demo)
3. "H.K. Farewell"
