= You Don't Care About Us =

1998 single by Placebo

Single by Placebo

from the album Without You I'm Nothing
- B-side: "20th Century Boy"; "Ion"
- Released: 28 September 1998
- Length: 3:53
- Label: Elevator Music; Hut; Virgin
- Songwriters: Steve Hewitt; Brian Molko; Stefan Olsdal
- Producer: Steve Osborne

Placebo singles chronology
"Pure Morning" (1998)	"You Don't Care About Us" (1998)	"Every You Every Me" (1999)

"You Don't Care About Us" is a song by English alternative rock band Placebo. It is the third track from their second studio album, Without You I'm Nothing (1998), and was released as the album's second single on 28 September 1998. The song reached No. 5 on the UK Singles Chart.

== Release and reception ==
"You Don't Care About Us" was released as the second single from Without You I'm Nothing on 28 September 1998. The single reached No. 5 on the UK Singles Chart. BBC Music called the song "a track that's propelled by an unstoppable, elastic bass line and that flips manically between wise, sighing despair and spitting adolescent rage. A song which feels like it had no choice but to be written and which is one of the rawest, most brilliant singles of the last decade."

== Music video ==
The song's music video portrays the band being thrown one by one into a tank full of sharks while a group of children stand by and watch. The video was filmed at the London Aquarium and directed by John Hillcoat.

== Live performances ==
The song was played throughout the Without You I'm Nothing tour and a number of shows in the early stages of the Black Market Music tour. It has not been performed live since 2001.

== Track listings ==
UK CD1 and cassette single, Australian CD single

1. "You Don't Care About Us" (radio edit)
2. "20th Century Boy" (T. Rex cover)
3. "Ion"

UK CD2

1. "You Don't Care About Us"
2. "Pure Morning" (Les Rhythmes Digitales remix)
3. "Pure Morning" (Howie B remix)

European CD single

1. "You Don't Care About Us" (radio edit)
2. "20th Century Boy" (T. Rex cover)

== Charts ==
=== Weekly charts ===
Chart (1998–1999)	Peak position
Australia (ARIA)	103
Europe (Eurochart Hot 100)	14
Scotland Singles (OCC)	4
UK Singles (OCC)	5

=== Year-end charts ===
Chart (1998)	Position
UK Singles (OCC)	182
