= Without You I'm Nothing (Placebo album) =

Studio album by Placebo
- Released: 12 October 1998
- Recorded: Mid–late 1998
- Studio: Real World, Bath; Livingston, London, England
- Genre: Alternative rock; glam rock; Britpop
- Length: 65:48
- Label: Hut
- Producer: Steve Osborne; Phil Vinall

Placebo chronology
Placebo (1996)	Without You I'm Nothing (1998)	Black Market Music (2000)

Singles from Without You I'm Nothing
- 1. "Pure Morning" Released: 3 August 1998; 2. "You Don't Care About Us" Released: 28 September 1998; 3. "Every You Every Me" Released: 25 January 1999; 4. "Without You I'm Nothing" Released: 16 August 1999; 5. "Burger Queen Français" Released: 22 November 1999

Without You I'm Nothing is the second studio album by British alternative rock band Placebo. Recorded in mid-to-late 1998, it was released on 12 October 1998 by record labels Hut and Virgin Records.

The album was a critical and commercial success, peaking at number 7 on the UK Albums Chart and at number 20 on the US Billboard Heatseekers Albums chart. Without You I'm Nothing went platinum in the UK and gold in France and has sold over one million copies to date. The album spawned five singles, including "Every You Every Me", "Pure Morning" and "You Don't Care About Us".

== Background ==
Placebo released their debut album Placebo in 1996 and was a massive success, going gold in the UK. The same year they began writing new material for the album. Still on Hut Records, the band signed to major label Virgin Records in 1997 and began recording the album.

== Recording ==
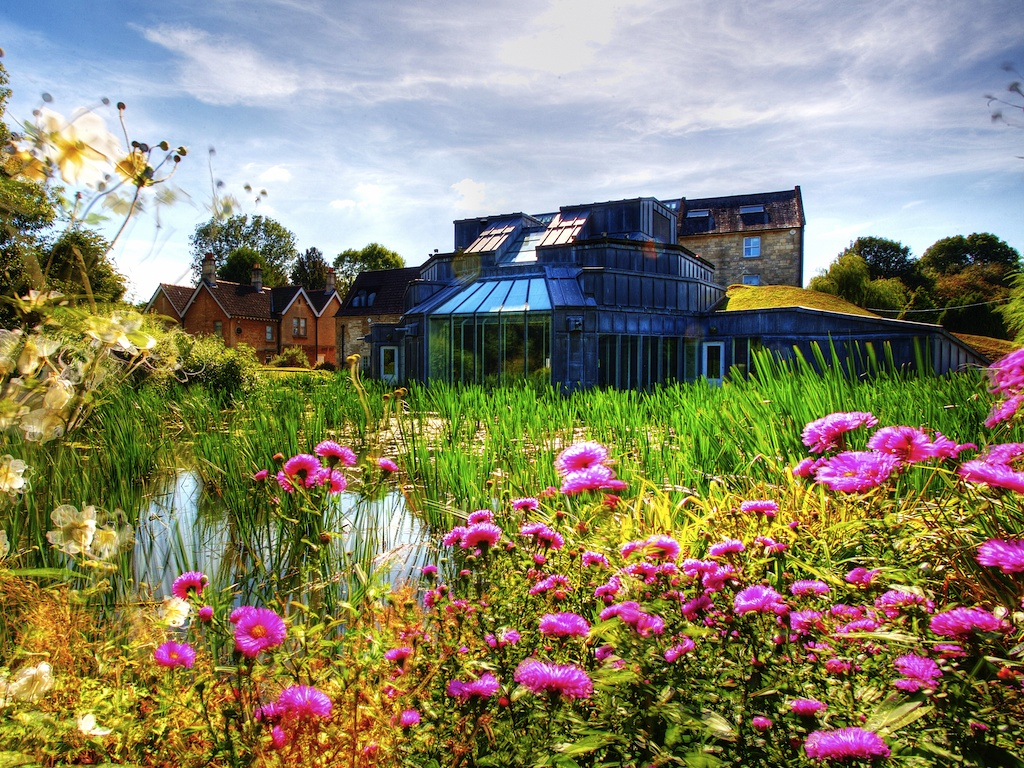
Real World Studios

The album was recorded over three months in 1998 at Real World Studios in Wiltshire. Twelve songs were originally recorded in the sessions, excluding "Pure Morning" and including another track, "Kitsch Object", which was never included on the album as the band was not satisfied with it. The guitar was recorded in a "U shaped" control room. The band said that whoever wrote the part for the guitar played guitar, with Placebo's frontman Brian Molko noting that "It's not that we're territorial – anything but – it's just an idea that the best person to follow an idea through is the person who had it". The vocals are considerably lower in tone; Molko said he was tired of having a high-pitched "squeaky" voice. These were recorded in a control room at Real World Studios and the drums recorded in a kitchen.

The album was produced by Steve Osborne because they wanted a producer who was involved with dance music as well as rock music, and they also did not have many options at the time. "Pure Morning" was recorded later at Livingston Recording Studios; produced Phil Vinall, originally as a b-side. At the last minute, the band included "Pure Morning" on the album as they liked the song very much.

The band was not entirely happy with the recording sessions. Later on, Molko stated that despite appreciating Osborne's producing skills, the chemistry between band and producer "didn't spark the way we wanted it to spark". He felt it was slightly overproduced and that it contained "too many slow songs for a second album". However, he added that it is still a record the band is proud of.

== Composition ==
=== Musical structure ===
"Pure Morning"

The album's music was written by the whole band. It focused on a more mellow sound on many songs, in comparison to Placebo. Album opener "Pure Morning" consists mainly of a guitar loop. The guitar style and tuning is influenced by American band Sonic Youth.

=== Lyrics and themes ===
The people who inspired it are a couple of friends of mine, you know; it's kind of like a celebration of a friendship with women. It's also a song about coming down, ending the day, as everybody else's day is sort of starting, and feeling dislocated from the world, really, and kind of like yearning for a friend to put their arms around you to make the come down easier.

— Brian Molko, 1998

The songs on Without You I'm Nothing were written around the time Placebo came out, in 1996. The album appears to be more personal than their debut and reflects on Molko's past. The album's opening song "Pure Morning" was written off the top of Molko's head. It was written about celebration of friendship; hence the repetition of the line "A friend in need's a friend indeed". The title of "Brick Shithouse" comes from an old English phrase meaning that, if somebody is built like a "brick shithouse", they have a lot of muscle but are not very clever. In an interview Molko said that the song is "a ghost story, about somebody watching their lover make love to the person who killed them".

Many of the lyrics on the album seem to deal with romance. "You Don't Care About Us" which was written about an ex-lover telling their partner they are terrible at relationships. The title of the album Without You I'm Nothing did not necessarily have anything to do with the song; the original title of the album was Placebo 2 as the band could not think of anything else. The title was loosely inspired by a film with the same name by Sandra Bernhard. The song "Allergic (To Thoughts of Mother Earth)" was written about Molko's view on the environment, and Christians who do not care about the environment because "to them their rewards will always be in Heaven and not on this earth".

Brian Molko has said that "My Sweet Prince" was important to him and that it was about two romances, one with drugs and one with a person, with both ending tragically. There are many references to heroin, such as "Me and the dragon/Can chase all the pain away" and "Close up the hole in my vein". "Scared of Girls" is about being vulnerable and being ashamed of who you are.

The last two songs, "Burger Queen" – which was written about a homosexual, drug-addicted goth in Luxembourg – and "Evil Dildo" were written during a soundcheck at Leipzig on their first German tour in October 1996, and were two of the first songs to be written for the album. The title for "Burger Queen" is a play on Burger King and Luxembourg.

The voices heard during the hidden track "Evil Dildo" are actual death threats left on Molko's answerphone. The second of these voices, over the outro to this song (starting at roughly 21:30), is exactly the same as that in the outro of the Aphex Twin song "Funny Little Man" on the Come to Daddy EP, which was released almost exactly a year before this album.

== Packaging ==
The album cover was photographed by English photographer Corrine Day, who also photographed the covers for the promotional singles on the album. Day was known for her use of natural light, alluring yet gritty subject matter, candid shooting style, and raw sincerity that was found in both her personal work and work as a fashion photographer. The album cover features two women, sisters Sarah and Sally Edwards (who run the online Blag Magazine as of 2024), sitting on a table in front of each other, looking down at the table. The light coming in from the curtains makes a yellow colour on the cover of the album. The back cover shows a couch in front of some red curtains and shows the track listing and all of the information instead of putting it in the booklet. Two different coloured CDs were made; some black and some red.

== Promotion ==
In August 1998, the band released the single "Pure Morning". It reached number 4 in the UK Singles Chart. The second single, "You Don't Care About Us", was released in September and reached number 5.

== Release ==
Without You I'm Nothing was released on 12 October 1998. The album debuted at number 7 in the UK and French albums chart and at number 20 in the USA Heatseekers chart. It was later certified platinum on 15 August 2003 and has sold over one million copies to date. It also went platinum in Australia and Europe and gold in France. The album was released on CD, cassette and vinyl.

Three further singles were released: "Every You Every Me" on 25 January 1999, "Without You I'm Nothing" on 16 August and "Burger Queen" on 22 November. Videos were made for all singles except "Burger Queen". The video for "Without You I'm Nothing" features a live performance with David Bowie, which was included on the single release, and the video for "Every You Every Me" features clips from the movie Cruel Intentions, as well as another version with the band playing the song live at London's Brixton Academy.

== Reception ==
Professional ratings
Review scores
Source	Rating
AllMusic	4/5 stars
The Boston Phoenix	3/4 stars
Encyclopedia of Popular Music	4/5 stars
Los Angeles Times	3.5/4 stars
NME	8/10
Pitchfork	5.1/10
PopMatters	7/10
Q	4/5 stars
Rolling Stone	3/5 stars
Select	3/5

Without You I'm Nothing has been generally well received by critics. James Oldham of NME called it "A thrilling record, then, made by freaks, for freaks. Just don't expect to leave with your soul intact". Delvin Neugebauer of Trouser Press remarked that Osborne's production "brings a new dimension to the songs, making their seamy subject matter feel less like compulsive thrill-seeking than insecurity and agoraphobia." Michael Sandlin of Pitchfork wrote "Moonboy Molko is a lousy songwriter, but his campy lyrical melodrama hits home with paste-eating geeks and plenty of hard-up, acne-ridden adolescents... [...] providing entertainment ideally suited for the young, cynical, insecure and sexually-ambiguous male virgin".

A year later, Ned Raggett ranked the album at number 54 on his list of "The Top 136 or So Albums of the Nineties". In 2010, Musikexpress ranked the album at number 49 on their list of "The 50 Best Albums of 1990s". Polish webzine Screenagers ranked it number 21 on its 2004 list of the Top 100 Albums of the '90s. The album has also appeared in all-time best albums lists; the German edition of Rolling Stone included the album at number 366 in their 2004 list of "The 500 Greatest Albums of All Time".

== Tour ==
A thirteen-month tour accompanied the album; during this tour Stefan Olsdal fell off the stage and broke his arm, whilst on the same evening Brian Molko slept in the same position for ten hours, waking up with a compressed vertebrae in his neck and with no feeling in his head.

== Track listing ==
All lyrics are written by Brian Molko; all music is composed by Placebo, except where noted.

No.	Title	Writer(s)	Length
1.	"Pure Morning"		4:14
2.	"Brick Shithouse"		3:18
3.	"You Don't Care About Us"		3:58
4.	"Ask for Answers"		5:19
5.	"Without You I'm Nothing"		4:08
6.	"Allergic (To Thoughts of Mother Earth)"		3:49
7.	"The Crawl"		2:59
8.	"Every You Every Me"	Molko; Paul Campion	3:33
9.	"My Sweet Prince"		5:45
10.	"Summer's Gone"		3:05
11.	"Scared of Girls"		3:01
12.	"Burger Queen" ("Burger Queen" ends at 6:14, hidden track "Evil Dildo" starts at 14:45, but it is a separate track on some digital copies.)		22:39
Total length:			65:48

Japanese edition bonus track
No.	Title	Writer(s)	Length
13.	"20th Century Boy" (T. Rex cover)	Marc Bolan

== Personnel ==
Placebo

- Brian Molko – vocals, guitar, bass (tracks 4 and 12)
- Stefan Olsdal – bass, guitar, piano (tracks 7 and 9)
- Steve Hewitt – drums, percussion

Technical

- Adrian Bushby – engineering (tracks 2–12)
- Paul Corkett – additional engineering
- Jake Davies – mixing assistance
- Phelan Kane – programming (track 1)
- Teo Miller – engineering (track 1)
- Steve Osborne – production (tracks 2–12)
- Bunt Stafford-Clark – mastering (at Townhouse Studios, London)
- Phil Vinall – production (track 1)
- Corinne Day – sleeve photography
- Placebo – sleeve design
- Blue Source – sleeve design

== Weekly charts ==
Chart (1998-1999)	Peak position
Australian Albums (ARIA)	14
Austrian Albums (Ö3 Austria)	43
Belgian Albums (Ultratop Flanders)	26
Dutch Albums (Album Top 100)	65
European Top 100 Albums (Music & Media)	14
French Albums (SNEP)	7
German Albums (Offizielle Top 100)	55
New Zealand Albums (RMNZ)	15
Norwegian Albums (VG-lista)	31
Scottish Albums (Official Charts)	7
Swiss Albums (Schweizer Hitparade)	95
UK Albums (Official Charts)	7

=== Singles ===
Year	Single	Peak positions						
Year	Single	AUS	FRA	GER	NLD	NZ	UK	US Mod
1998	"Pure Morning"	49	—	—	84	21	4	19
1998	"You Don't Care About Us"	—	—	—	—	—	5	—
1999	"Every You Every Me"	46	—	99	—	—	11	—
1999	"Without You I'm Nothing"	—	79	—	—	—	—	—
1999	"Burger Queen Français"	—	78	—	—	—	—	—
"—" denotes releases that did not chart.

== Certifications and sales ==
Certifications and sales for Without You I'm Nothing
Region	Certification	Certified units/sales
Australia (ARIA)	Gold	35,000^{^}
Belgium (BRMA)	Platinum	50,000^{*}
France (SNEP)	Gold	100,000^{*}
Germany	—	80,000
Greece (IFPI Greece)	Gold	15,000^{^}
New Zealand (RMNZ)	Gold	7,500^{^}
United Kingdom (BPI)	Platinum	391,000
United States	—	167,000
Summaries
Europe (IFPI)	Platinum	1,000,000^{*}
Worldwide	—N/a	1,000,000
^{*} Sales figures based on certification alone.^{^} Shipments figures based on certification alone.
