= Lantana (singer) =

Spanish musician, producer and actress

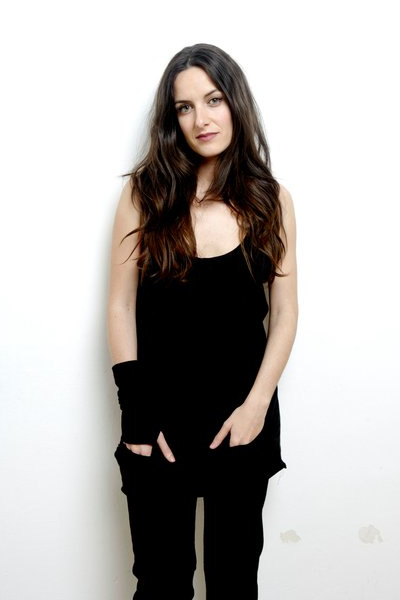
- Lantana (Alba Gárate)

Background information
- Born: Alba Sara Gárate Maculet; 18 December 1980 (age 45); Barcelona, Catalonia, Spain
- Genres: Pop
- Occupations: Singer-songwriter, performance artist, musician, producer, actress
- Instruments: Vocals, piano, synthesizer, guitars, bass
- Years active: 2006–present
- Labels: EMI/Virgin, Rubie Music
- Website: www.lantaname.com

Alba Gárate (born 18 December 1980), better known by her stage name, Lantalba, is a Spanish singer, songwriter, musician, producer and actress, previously known as Lantana. She was born in Barcelona and raised in Fuengirola, Málaga. She moved to Madrid when she was 19 years old to study acting and pursue her musical career. She was signed with EMI/Virgin by 2006 and Rubie Music in 2010. She was nominated to several important Spanish awards, including The 21st Goya Awards, MTV Spain Awards, Televisión Española Awards Album of the Year and The Spanish Music Awards. She currently lives in Berlin, Germany.

== Biography ==
Lantana was born in Barcelona and raised in the southern city of Fuengirola, Málaga. It was here where she started to feel her passion for music. She remembers "I started writing on the school bus. I would sit by the window on rainy days and I would just make songs up". Her family had a pub and by the time she was 14, she started singing in rock bands and working in a local kareoke bar. Later on she would move into the jazz scene, starting and directing several groups. She then moved to Madrid by the time she was 19 years old to pursue an acting career. Here she studied acting in ECAM and NIC of Madrid. She also studied with teachers such as Fernando Sansegundo, Fernando Piernas and Marta Alvarez. It was here where she began to sing standards and jazz in different clubs.

== Music career ==
In Madrid she started to write her own songs again. She quickly began playing in singer-songwriter clubs and was soon noticed by then EMI/Virgin A&R, Javier Liñán, who offered her a record deal. At the same time, she acted in several short films and got to be better known from her small role in the movie Azuloscurocasinegro by Daniel Sánchez Arévalo, where she also wrote the original song "Imaginarte", which was nominated for "Best Original Song" at the Goya Awards.

In 2006 Lantana signs with EMI/Virgin and releases a self-titled EP, "Lantana". She releases her first LP, "Desorden y Amor", the next year with Cádiz native Suso Saiz as producer. This latter album was nominated by MTV Spain's spectators as "Best Artist Revelation" 2007. The same year, the electronic band Hotel Persona releases a remix of her first single, "Siempre". She also films the video of the unreleased song "Sally's Song" from The Nightmare Before Christmas by Tim Burton.

In 2010, no longer with EMI, Lantana goes to London to record her third album "Ex-Corazón", produced by Dimitri Tikovoi and releases it independently with her own label, Rubie Music. She spends the rest of the year and great part of the next one touring in Spain.

She also released 2 videoclips, "Ex-Corazón", which aired in most of Spain's TV channels and "Perfecto", filmed in Granada.

She relocated to Berlin in 2011 where she started working on her next album.

=== El Encanto (EP - 2013) ===
En EP recorded between Berlin and London, was produced by Stefan Olsdal (Placebo (band), who also played synthesizers in "Aquello del Querer" and "Desde que te fuiste".

=== Ex-Corazón (LP - 2007) ===
Album recorded entirely in London and produced by Dimitri Tikovoi (Placebo (band), The Raveonettes, The Horrors and Goldfrapp).

=== Desorden y Amor (LP - 2007) ===
Album mostly produced by Suso Saíz, filled with many string arrangements.

=== Lantana (EP - 2006) ===
Lantana's debut album, Lantana, was released in 2006. It is composed of five songs, including "Imaginarte", song included in the original soundtrack of the movie Azuloscurocasinegro, and nominated to the Goya awards. Mostly produced by Lantana.

=== Present ===
She is currently working on a new LP, produced, played entirely, and mixed by Stefan Olsdal (Placebo (band).

== Discography ==
Studio albums

- 2015: La Chica de los Ojos Dorados (LP)
- 2013: El Encanto (EP)
- 2010: Ex-Corazón (LP)
- 2007: Desorden y Amor (LP)
- 2006: Lantana (EP)

Singles

- 2013: La noche de los muertos vivientes
- 2012: Estoy Bailando (Cover of Loretta and Daniela Goggi)

Remixes

- 2010: Ex-Corazón (Remixes)
- 2007: Siempre (Remix by Hotel Persona: Stefan Olsdal and David Amen)

Film soundtracks

- 2011: Ojalá (Vuela) (Original Soundtrack for The Magic of Hope)
- 2006: Imaginarte (Original Soundtrack for Azuloscurocasinegro)

== Nominations ==
- 2008: Spanish Music Awards (Revelation artist)
- 2007: Goya Awards (Best original song)
- 2007: MTV Spain Awards
- 2007: Televisión Española Awards (Album of the Year)

== Collaborations ==
- 2010: Lantana joins 20 other Spanish independent artists playing in a benefit concert for the South Mozambique Foundation, helping to create music schools in that country.
- 2009: Lantana sang live in the Roman Theater of Mérida, for the 20th anniversary of the renown Spanish pop band Tam Tam Go's.

== Charity work ==
- 2010 – Benefit concert for South Mozambique Foundation.
- 2011–2012 - All sales of her song "Vuela" went to Theodora Foundation.
- 2013–2014 - Part of her music sales go to Oxfam America.

== Filmography ==
Film
Year	Film	Role	Notes
2011	El Vuelo del Tren	Elena	Also, original song
2008	Furia		Thriller
2006	Los Planetas		
2006	Azuloscurocasinegro		Also, original song, nominated to the Goya Awards 2007
2006	Proverbio Chino		Short film nominated to the Goya Awards 2008
2005	Amiguisimas		
2003	Domingos	Woman's voice	
Television
Year	Title	Role	Notes
2004	El Comisario		Spanish TV series
