= Saman Kesh =

American filmmaker and music video director

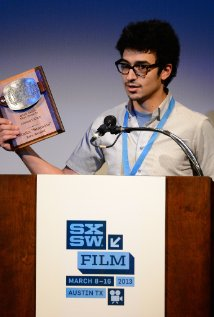
- Kesh accepting SXSW Best Video award in 2013
- Born: Saman Keshavarz; August 8, 1986 (age 40); Tehran, Iran
- Education: Art Center College of Design
- Occupations: Filmmaker, music video director
- Years active: 2009-present

Saman Kesh (born Saman Keshavarz) is an Iranian-American filmmaker based in Los Angeles, California, United States. He is known for his narrative music video work for notable artists such as Basement Jaxx, Calvin Harris, Kygo, Placebo, !!!, Vitalic, Apparat and Porter Robinson.

In 2009, during his attendance as a film student at Art Center College of Design, Kesh came into light with his first music video for Cinnamon Chasers' first single: "Luv Deluxe". Luv Deluxe has received over six million views to date, won SXSW Best Music Video award in 2010, and was shown in Saatchi & Saatchi's Director Showcase in 2010 at Cannes.

In 2012, he went on to direct videos for Ed Sheeran, Deus and Calvin Harris, his video for the track 'Stamina' from French producer Vitalic sparked controversy with its thematic statements regarding weight loss and obesity in pop culture. The video resulted in Kesh winning his second SXSW "Best Video" award in 2013.

In 2013, Kesh moved into the narrative world with his short sci-fi short film, Controller. The short received the No. 2 spot on Deadline Hollywood's 2013 ViewFinder's list, which polls Hollywood industry professionals on their favorite short films of the year.

Later that year, he collaborated with celebrity author Bret Easton Ellis and the British alternative rock band Placebo on a short film series titled 'Unfortunate Details' which examined cases of sexual incidents gone awry. They were released as two music videos, for the band's album, Loud Like Love.

In 2014 Kesh served as overseeing advisor to a team of directors for Visa's "Samba of the World", a digital campaign for the 2014 FIFA World Cup. Made in collaboration with AKQA and COPILOT Music and Sound, this interactive music video experience allowed fans to listen and watch 32 different music videos, based on 32 different countries, in real time.

His video "Never Say Never", for Basement Jaxx details the development of a fictional product called TWERKBOT, a Twerking robot. The video features controversial themes on robotics, sexuality, and pop-culture. His most recent video for the 2015 YouTube Music Awards was for the artist Kygo, which featured an alien astronaut couple that crash-lands a costume party.

Kesh is currently developing several films to direct, including Cubed, setup at Lionsgate Entertainment, which is loosely based on the 1997 cult film, Cube. Deadline Hollywood announced that Kesh will be adapting and directing a feature-length version of Controller with 20th Century Fox.

== Filmography ==
=== Music videos ===
Year	Song title	Artist
2009	"Luv Deluxe"	Cinnamon Chasers
2010	"Jamie, My Intentions Are Bass"	!!!
2010	"Midnight Club Trilogy"	Russ Chimes
2011	"Song of Los"	Apparat
2012	"Stamina"	Vitalic
2012	"We'll Be Coming Back"	Calvin Harris
2012	"Drunk"	Ed Sheeran
2013	"Too Many Friends"	Placebo
2014	"Never Say Never"	Basement Jaxx
2014	"Loud Like Love"	Placebo
2015	"Stole The Show"	Kygo
2019	"Hungry Child"	Hot Chip
2025	"Azizam"	Ed Sheeran
