= Loud Like Love =

Studio album by Placebo
- Released: 16 September 2013
- Recorded: 2012–2013
- Studio: RAK, London, UK
- Genre: Alternative rock
- Length: 47:16
- Label: Vertigo
- Producer: Adam Noble

Placebo chronology
B3EP (2012)	Loud Like Love (2013)	MTV Unplugged (2015)

Singles from Loud Like Love
- 1. "Too Many Friends" Released: 23 August 2013; 2. "Loud Like Love" Released: 18 March 2014; 3. "A Million Little Pieces" Released: 24 June 2014

Loud Like Love is the seventh studio album by British alternative rock band Placebo, recorded between 2012 and 2013 and released on 16 September 2013.

The album reached number 13 in the UK Albums Chart, and received a mixed response from critics. Three singles were released from the album: "Too Many Friends", "Loud Like Love" and "A Million Little Pieces". It is the band's final album to feature the drummer Steve Forrest.

== Background ==
During the Battle for the Sun tour, band members Brian Molko and Stefan Olsdal both stated on various occasions that they were working on material for the next studio album. In November 2011, the band announced via their Facebook page and official website that they will be returning to the studio in 2012 to record their seventh studio album.

== Recording ==
Molko was originally working on material for a possible solo release, and he wrote various songs for it that would later appear on Loud Like Love. The band went in the recording studio to record some singles, but then they began to record more and more material.

The album was recorded in London's RAK Studios, where Placebo had also recorded their fifth studio album, Meds. Production duties, as well as mixing, were handled by Adam Noble.

== Composition ==
The album revolves around the theme of love, in all different forms: romance, happiness and also heartbreak. "Too Many Friends" deals with people spending time on the internet and end up being far more close to the hundreds of friends on the internet than off the computer. "Rob the Bank" is about somebody loving you unconditionally, even if you, in this case, rob a bank.

== Release ==
The album was announced on 21 May 2013 through the band's official website. Loud Like Love's track listing and its first single, "Too Many Friends", were officially announced on 17 June 2013.

The album's lead single, "Too Many Friends", was released on 8 July 2013. The music video, written and directed by Saman Kesh, was filmed in Los Angeles, and features the first collaboration between Placebo and American novelist Bret Easton Ellis. Another song premiered from the album is the track "Loud Like Love", which was released as a digital download on 6 August 2013 and as a single on 18 March 2014.

The album was released worldwide on 16 September 2013. The release formats include a box set, a deluxe CD digipack with the DVD "Live at RAK Studios", a CD and a 12" vinyl. On the day of Loud Like Love's release, an internet show titled "LLLTV" was streamed live from YouTube Studios in London. It was the first YouTube live stream of its kind. The show featured, among other things, Placebo performing songs from the album and older songs (chosen in part by the audience through an online poll), band interviews and guest appearances by people who collaborated with Placebo on the making of the album.

The album entered the UK Albums Chart at number 13, the first time Placebo have missed the UK Top Ten in ten years (since Sleeping With Ghosts) and their lowest UK album position ever. The album also entered the French Albums Chart at number 3, the first time they missed the French number one spot since Without You I'm Nothing fifteen years earlier. The album charted in the Australian Albums Chart at number 9 and at number 18 in the Irish Albums Chart. Loud Like Love is also the first Placebo album to miss the Portuguese Top Five, peaking at number 15. The album entered the US Billboard chart at number 98, where the previous one, Battle for the Sun, reached number 51. The album did peak at number 1 in Switzerland, Placebo's third album in a row to do so. This currently is the album's only number 1 peak.

== Reception ==
Professional ratings
Aggregate scores
Source	Rating
Metacritic	56/100
Review scores
Source	Rating
AllMusic	3.5/5 stars
Alternative Press	2.5/5 stars
Clash	6/10
Drowned in Sound	5/10
The Guardian	2/5 stars
The Line of Best Fit	6/10
laut.de	3/5 stars
Mojo	3/5 stars
NME	2/5 stars
Q	4/5 stars

Loud Like Love was met with generally mixed reviews from music critics. The album holds an approval rating of 55/100 at Metacritic, which indicates a mixed or average reception.

Alternative Press' Mischa Pearlman wrote that "too much of this album comes off like self-parody, meaning it's a far cry from the pulverizing power of their best work". AllMusic wrote that "many of these songs play like less-alienated, if no less paranoid, OK Computer-era Radiohead cuts", adding that "however, the songs here are still laden with Molko's high-pitched vocals, which he characteristically uses to play the eternally angst-ridden and alienated teenager -- something the band's fans will surely appreciate", giving the album 3.5 stars out of 5. Amanda Arber of Clash said that Loud Like Love is "easy to absorb musically and easy to ignore lyrically" and "50 minutes of simply okay alt-rock." The Guardian gave the album two stars out of five, saying "the veteran band sticks to what it knows for Loud Like Love."

== Track listing ==
All tracks are written by Brian Molko, Stefan Olsdal and Steve Forrest.

No.	Title	Length
1.	"Loud Like Love"	4:51
2.	"Scene of the Crime"	3:27
3.	"Too Many Friends"	3:34
4.	"Hold on to Me"	4:54
5.	"Rob the Bank"	3:38
6.	"A Million Little Pieces"	4:40
7.	"Exit Wounds"	5:48
8.	"Purify"	3:45
9.	"Begin the End"	6:00
10.	"Bosco"	6:39
Total length:		47:16

Bonus track (box set download and iTunes)
No.	Title	Length
11.	"Pity Party (of One)"	4:19

Deluxe edition DVD – Live at RAK Studios
No.	Title	Length
1.	"Loud Like Love"	5:25
2.	"Scene of the Crime"	3:55
3.	"Too Many Friends"	4:12
4.	"Purify"	3:54
5.	"Pity Party (of One)"	4:15
6.	"Exit Wounds"	6:16
7.	"A Million Little Pieces"	5:02
8.	"Begin the End"	6:55

== Charts ==
=== Weekly charts ===
Chart (2013)	Peak position
Australian Albums (ARIA)	9
Austrian Albums (Ö3 Austria)	2
Belgian Albums (Ultratop Flanders)	2
Belgian Albums (Ultratop Wallonia)	2
Danish Albums (Hitlisten)	20
Dutch Albums (Album Top 100)	7
Finnish Albums (Suomen virallinen lista)	22
French Albums (SNEP)	3
German Albums (Offizielle Top 100)	3
Hungarian Albums (MAHASZ)	12
Italian Albums (FIMI)	2
Irish Albums (IRMA)	18
New Zealand Albums (RMNZ)	31
Norwegian Albums (VG-lista)	23
Portuguese Albums (AFP)	15
Polish Albums (ZPAV)	12
Scottish Albums (Official Charts)	15
Spanish Albums (Promusicae)	16
Swiss Albums (Schweizer Hitparade)	1
UK Albums (Official Charts)	13
US Billboard 200	98
US Top Alternative Albums (Billboard)	23
US Top Rock Albums (Billboard)	32

=== Year-end charts ===
Chart (2013)	Position
Austrian Albums (Ö3 Austria)	68
Belgian Albums (Ultratop Flanders)	78
Belgian Albums (Ultratop Wallonia)	50
French Albums (SNEP)	96
German Albums (Offizielle Top 100)	59
Swiss Albums (Schweizer Hitparade)	70

Chart (2014)	Position
Belgian Albums (Ultratop Wallonia)	190

== Certifications and sales ==
Region	Certification	Certified units/sales
Austria (IFPI Austria)	Gold	7,500^{*}
France	—	65,000
Germany (BVMI)	Gold	100,000^{^}
^{*} Sales figures based on certification alone.^{^} Shipments figures based on certification alone.

== Release history ==
Region	Date	Format(s)
Europe	13 September 2013	Compact disc; digital download; LP
Worldwide	16 September 2013	Compact disc; digital download; LP

== Personnel ==
Placebo

- Brian Molko – vocals, guitar, keyboards
- Stefan Olsdal – bass guitar, guitar, piano, keyboards, cimbalom, backing vocals
- Steve Forrest – drums, percussion

with:

- Bill Lloyd – keyboards, bass guitar
- Fiona Brice – string arrangements, backing vocals
- Fabian Waltmann – additional programming

Technical

- Adam Noble – production, mixing, programming
- Mike Horner – assistant engineer (RAK Studios, London)
- John Prestage – assistant engineer (Strongroom Studios, London)
- Tom Bailey – assistant engineer (Air Studios, London)
- Dick Beetham – mastering
- Joseph Llanes – photography
