= Song to Say Goodbye =

Single by Placebo

from the album Meds
- Released: 6 March 2006
- Genre: Alternative rock
- Length: 3:36
- Label: Virgin
- Songwriters: Steve Hewitt, Brian Molko and Stefan Olsdal
- Producer: Dimitri Tikovoi

Placebo singles chronology
"Because I Want You" (2006)	"Song to Say Goodbye" (2006)	"Infra-Red" (2006)

"Song to Say Goodbye" is a song by an English alternative rock band Placebo from their fifth studio album, Meds (2006). It was released on 6 March 2006 as the lead single from Meds in all territories outside of the United Kingdom, where "Because I Want You" was released as the lead single instead. The song was written by Steve Hewitt, Brian Molko and Stefan Olsdal, and produced by Dimitri Tikovoi. It develops around piano notes that repeat throughout it, and deals with heroin addiction and its influence on the relationships of the parties involved. The cover art features a blurred picture of vocalist Brian Molko.

There is a live version available of the song on the live EP Live at La Cigale.

The song reached the top ten in Finland, Greece, Italy and Spain.

== Music video ==
The original video written and directed by Philippe André portrays a mentally challenged father while his son is trying to cope with his dad's condition. André made an 8-minute extended version of the music video. Placebo remixed the track for the film released on DVD by EMI. It was filmed in Los Angeles.

== Track listing ==
=== 7" ===
- Side A – "Song to Say Goodbye" (Radio edit)
- Side B – "Because I Want You" (Ladytron remix)

=== Slimline Wallet CD ===
1. "Song to Say Goodbye" (Radio edit)
2. "Because I Want You" (Russell Lissack Bloc Party remix)

=== Maxi CD ===
1. "Song to Say Goodbye" (album version)
2. "36 Degrees" (Live from Wembley)
3. "Because I Want You" (Russell Lissack Bloc Party remix)
4. "Because I Want You" (Ladytron Club mix)

== Charts ==
=== Weekly charts ===
Chart (2006)	Peak position
Australia (ARIA)	30
Austria (Ö3 Austria Top 40)	44
Belgium (Ultratop 50 Flanders)	49
Belgium (Ultratop 50 Wallonia)	18
Finland (Suomen virallinen lista)	8
France (SNEP)	41
Germany (GfK)	35
Greece (IFPI)	6
Italy (FIMI)	5
Spain (PROMUSICAE)	7
Switzerland (Schweizer Hitparade)	38

== Cover versions and remixes ==
=== Harakiri for the Sky version (2021) ===
"Song to Say Goodbye" was covered and released as a single by Austrian post-black metal band Harakiri for the Sky in January 2021. The song closes Harakiri for the Sky's album "Mӕre" just as it closes Placebo's album Meds.
