= Battle for the Sun =

Studio album by Placebo
- Released: 8 June 2009
- Recorded: August–September 2008
- Studio: Metalworks Studios, Canada
- Genre: Alternative rock
- Length: 52:15
- Label: PIAS
- Producer: David Bottrill

Placebo chronology
Extended Play '07 (2007)	Battle for the Sun (2009)	Live at Angkor Wat (2011)

Singles from Battle for the Sun
- 1. "For What It's Worth" Released: 20 April 2009; 2. "The Never-Ending Why" Released: 14 September 2009; 3. "Ashtray Heart" Released: 21 September 2009; 4. "Bright Lights" Released: 8 February 2010

Battle for the Sun is the sixth studio album by British alternative rock band Placebo. It was recorded in Canada in 2008 and released on 8 June 2009 by record label PIAS. It is their first album with new drummer Steve Forrest, following the departure of Steve Hewitt in 2007.

Battle for the Sun reached number 8 in the UK Albums Chart, and received a generally favourable reaction from critics. Four singles were released from the album: "For What It's Worth", "The Never-Ending Why", "Ashtray Heart" and "Bright Lights".

== Production ==
David Bottrill produced the record, after having previously worked with Tool, Muse, Silverchair, Remy Zero, and dEUS. James Brown, who worked on the band's 2006 album Meds, engineered. It is also the first album with the new drummer, Steve Forrest. Recording took place at Metalworks Studios, Mississauga, Ontario.

On Battle for the Sun, the band utilize new instruments, such as trumpets and saxophones. Molko even experimented with the Springtime (experimental electric guitar made by Yuri Landman).

== Content ==
The material on the album has influences from such bands as PJ Harvey and My Bloody Valentine.

Frontman Brian Molko said on the concept of the album:

We've made a record about choosing life, about choosing to live, about stepping out of the darkness and into the light. Not necessarily turning your back on the darkness because it's there, it's essential; it's a part of who you are, but more about the choice of standing in the sunlight instead.

Molko has also stated that Battle for the Sun is the band's first album with a discernible thematic unity. Molko states that his favourite track from the album is "Speak in Tongues".

Molko was inspired to write bonus track "Unisex" by the movie Cloverfield.

== Release ==
The title track debuted on Zane Lowe's BBC Radio 1 show 17 March 2009. After the world première, it became available for free download on the band's official site. At an exclusive secret gig held on 17 March 2009, in London, the band played a number of new songs from the album, including the tracks "Ashtray Heart", "Julien", "Kitty Litter", and "Devil in the Details". They also covered Nik Kershaw's "Wouldn't It Be Good". The album was made available for streaming on the band's official website between 29 May and 31 May 2009.

Battle for the Sun was released on 8 June 2009 as a download, CD, limited edition CD and DVD, LP, and a limited edition box set. It reached number 8 in the UK Albums Chart. Its debut in US marked 10,000 copies sold, and worldwide shipments were 500,000 copies worldwide.

In 2009. It was awarded a diamond certification from the Independent Music Companies Association which indicated sales of at least 250,000 copies throughout Europe.

The box set features the full album plus two extra studio tracks, a CD to access exclusive live recorded tracks, a DVD of the December 2008 Angkor Wat performance, a DVD of exclusive studio footage and a 32-page photo book featuring exclusive artwork, photos and handwritten lyrics as well as the full album on 2 x Heavy Vinyl LP.

== Critical reception ==
Professional ratings
Aggregate scores
Source	Rating
Metacritic	62/100
Review scores
Source	Rating
AllMusic	3/5 stars
Alternative Press	4.5/5 stars
Drowned in Sound	4/10 stars
IGN	8.9/10
Kerrang!	4/5 stars
NME	6/10 stars
Pitchfork	3.4/10
Rock Sound	8/10 stars
Rolling Stone	2.5/5 stars
The Times	3/5 stars

Battle for the Sun received a generally favourable reaction from critics. Eddie Fleisher of Alternative Press gave the album 4 and a half out of 5 stars, writing that Battle for the Sun "takes the best elements of their sound and focuses it into a cohesive listening experience ... there's no filler to be found". The review also notes how Steve Forrest as drummer gives the band a much-needed kick and how Brian Molko's lyrics are given more clarity. Fleisher also says the album contains two of the best Placebo songs ever, "Happy You're Gone" and "Kings of Medicine".

Others, however, have been less than receptive. NME said that Battle for the Sun was "a desperately transparent copy of originality. For those who still believe in them, Placebo will, at least, remain an efficacious live band at festivals this summer, but only given that the real thing (Suede, Muse, David Bowie, Nirvana et al) isn't currently on offer." Rolling Stone added that "too many songs ("Devil in the Details") are full of bombast and bland angst, as if these smart guys know better but can't help themselves".

== Track listing ==
All tracks are written by Placebo (Brian Molko, Stefan Olsdal and Steve Forrest), except as noted.

No.	Title	Writer(s)	Length
1.	"Kitty Litter"		3:47
2.	"Ashtray Heart"	Molko, Steve Ludwin, Jordan Page	3:32
3.	"Battle for the Sun"	Molko, Olsdal	5:33
4.	"For What It's Worth"		2:47
5.	"Devil in the Details"		4:28
6.	"Bright Lights"		3:32
7.	"Speak in Tongues"		4:06
8.	"The Never-Ending Why"		3:23
9.	"Julien"		4:43
10.	"Happy You're Gone"		3:50
11.	"Breathe Underwater"		3:44
12.	"Come Undone"		4:36
13.	"Kings of Medicine"		4:15
Total length:			52:15

Deluxe edition and vinyl bonus tracks
No.	Title	Length
14.	"Unisex"	4:04
15.	"The Movie on Your Eyelids"	3:53

iTunes pre-order bonus track
No.	Title	Length
14.	"Wouldn't It Be Good"	3:19

iTunes and Japanese bonus track
No.	Title	Length
14.	"In a Funk"	4:07

Hong Kong bonus track
No.	Title	Length
14.	"Post Blue" (Chinese Whispers Remix featuring Li Ya)	5:25

Amazon.com digital bonus tracks
No.	Title	Length
14.	"For What It's Worth" (Losers Maximal Techmix)	5:48
15.	"For What It's Worth" (Savours Remix)	6:00

Redux edition bonus disc
No.	Title	Length
1.	"Trigger Happy Hands"
2.	"Monster Truck"
3.	"Breathe Underwater" (Slow)
4.	"Unisex"
5.	"Because I Want You" (Redux)
6.	"Blind" (Redux)
7.	"Drag" (Redux)
8.	"Twenty Years" (Redux)
9.	"Soulmates" (Redux)
10.	"Trigger Happy Hands" (Buffalo Daughter remix)

Deluxe edition bonus CD-R
No.	Title	Length
1.	"Ashtray Heart" (live at Romexpo, Romania 2009)
2.	"Battle for the Sun" (live at Turkcell Arena, Turkey 2009)
3.	"Breathe Underwater" (live at Seoul Olympic Hall, South Korea 2009)
4.	"Bright Lights" (live at Leipzig Arena, Germany 2009)
5.	"Come Undone" (live at Summer Sonic Festival, Tokyo 2009)
6.	"Devil in the Details" (live at Stuttgart Schleyerhalle, Germany 2009)
7.	"For What It's Worth" (live at Pukkelpop Festival, Belgium 2009)
8.	"Happy You're Gone" (live at Rockwave Festival, Greece 2009)
9.	"The Never-Ending Why" (live at the Melbourne Soundwave Festival, Australia 2010)
10.	"Speak in Tongues" (live at Paris Zenith, France 2009)

Deluxe Edition bonus DVD 1: Live at Angkor Wat

- "Meds" – 5:23
- "Because I Want You" – 4:23
- "Follow the Cops Back Home" – 4:52
- "Black-Eyed" – 3:14
- "Post Blue" – 3:55
- "Blind" – 4:15
- "Drag" – 3:39
- "Teenage Angst" – 3:19
- "Twenty Years" – 4:55
- Detour documentary

Deluxe edition bonus DVD 2

- In the Studio: The Making of Battle for the Sun documentary

== Personnel ==
Placebo

- Brian Molko – vocals, guitar, Springtime guitar, keyboards, piano
- Stefan Olsdal – bass guitar, guitar, keyboards, piano, organ, backing vocals
- Steve Forrest – drums, percussion, backing vocals

Additional personnel

- Bill Lloyd – keyboards
- Fiona Brice – string arrangements
- Peter Cardinalli – brass arrangements
- Alex Cooksey – keyboards, piano, backing vocals
- Hazel Fernandes – backing vocals
- Valerie Etienne – backing vocals

Technical

- David Bottrill – production
- James Brown – engineering
- Wayne Cochrane – engineering assistance (tracking)
- Kevin Dietz – engineering (recording)
- Alan Moulder – mixing
- Darren Lawson – mixing assistance
- John Davis – mastering
- Joseph Llanes – sleeve photography
- Tim Young – Redux Edition remastering

== Charts ==
=== Weekly charts ===
Chart (2009)	Peak position
Australian Albums (ARIA)	8
Austrian Albums (Ö3 Austria)	1
Belgian Albums (Ultratop Flanders)	1
Belgian Albums (Ultratop Wallonia)	1
Canadian Albums (Nielsen SoundScan)	72
Danish Albums (Hitlisten)	12
Dutch Albums (Album Top 100)	5
Finnish Albums (Suomen virallinen lista)	2
French Albums (SNEP)	1
German Albums (Offizielle Top 100)	1
Hungarian Albums (MAHASZ)	25
Irish Albums (IRMA)	22
Italian Albums (FIMI)	5
New Zealand Albums (RMNZ)	14
Norwegian Albums (VG-lista)	16
Polish Albums (ZPAV)	14
Portuguese Albums (AFP)	4
Scottish Albums (Official Charts)	9
Spanish Albums (Promusicae)	5
Swedish Albums (Sverigetopplistan)	9
Swiss Albums (Schweizer Hitparade)	1
UK Albums (Official Charts)	8
UK Album Downloads (Official Charts)	7
UK Independent Albums (Official Charts)	1
US Billboard 200	51
US Independent Albums (Billboard)	8

=== Year-end charts ===
Chart (2009)	Position
Austrian Albums (Ö3 Austria)	61
Belgian Albums (Ultratop Flanders)	31
Belgian Albums (Ultratop Wallonia)	29
Dutch Albums (Album Top 100)	95
French Albums (SNEP)	51
German Albums (Offizielle Top 100)	45
Swiss Albums (Schweizer Hitparade)	47

== Certifications ==
Region	Certification	Certified units/sales
Belgium (BRMA)	Gold	15,000^{*}
France	—	85,000
Germany (BVMI)	Gold	100,000^{^}
United Kingdom (BPI)	Gold	100,000^{‡}
United States	—	10,000
^{*} Sales figures based on certification alone.^{^} Shipments figures based on certification alone.^{‡} Sales+streaming figures based on certification alone.

== Release history ==
Country	Date
Japan	3 June 2009
Australia	5 June 2009
Hong Kong	5 June 2009
United States	8 June 2009
Canada	8 June 2009
United Kingdom	8 June 2009
Philippines	7 November 2009
Worldwide (Redux Edition)	27 September 2010
