= Nancy Boy =

1997 single by Placebo

Single by Placebo

from the album Placebo
- B-side: "Slackerbitch"
- Released: 20 January 1997
- Genre: Alternative rock; grunge; Britpop
- Length: 3:48 (album version); 3:18 (radio edit)
- Label: Elevator Music; Hut
- Songwriters: Brian Molko; Stefan Olsdal; Robert Schultzberg
- Producer: Phil Vinall

Placebo singles chronology
"Teenage Angst" (1996)	"Nancy Boy" (1997)	"Pure Morning" (1998)

"Nancy Boy" is a song by British alternative rock band Placebo, released on 20 January 1997, as the fourth single from their debut self-titled album, released on Hut Records. As with their first single "Come Home", the single edit is a re-recorded version, noticeably different from the album version. "Nancy Boy" contains themes of drugs, sex, gender confusion and bisexuality. "Nancy Boy" became their breakthrough single, peaking at number four in the UK Singles Chart a month after the single's release. While Placebo charted at number forty upon its release, after the release of "Nancy Boy" the album re-entered the UK Albums Chart at number five in February, staying on chart for thirteen weeks.

== Background ==
Placebo were formed in 1994, when Brian Molko and Stefan Olsdal met each other at the South Kensington tube station. Molko, observing that Olsdal had a guitar strapped to his back, invited Olsdal to watch him perform at a local bar. On the strength of Molko's performance, Olsdal decided that they should start a band. The two formed Ashtray Heart, a lo-fi duo, playing mostly on children's toy instruments. They decided they needed a drummer, and suggested Steve Hewitt, but he was drumming for London band Breed. Robert Schultzberg then became their drummer. Schultzberg had known Olsdal from boarding school in Sigtuna, Sweden where they'd played together in a band.

On 23 October 1995, they performed "Nancy Boy" on the TV program Unsigned in the City. They released their debut single "Come Home" on Deceptive records in 1996, before being signed by Hut Records. They then recorded their debut album, being released on 17 June 1996.

After an argument in August 1996, right before doing their first TV show, Molko decided that it would be best for the band if Schultzberg left. But Schultzberg suggested playing together until they finished the promotion of their first album, Placebo, and the band accepted. Eventually, Schultzberg left the band in September 1996. Before going on stage for their first show in the state of New York, Olsdal informed Schultzberg that he would not perform on the tour in Germany that was following the US tour. Schultzberg played two more shows with the band in Paris after the US tour, the last of which was a performance at Nulle Part Aillleurs. Molko has said that he was "tired of being the focus of Robert's rages against the world." Hewitt joined Placebo as their full-time drummer the same year.

== Lyrics and Production ==
"Because it was so hooky and it was in a major key, when we got into the rehearsal room, I had to turn my distortion pedal up to 11 and ... put as much sonic brutality in it to counterbalance the major key sweetness and accessibility of the chorus."

— Brian Molko

"Nancy Boy" revolves around the themes of drugs, sex and bisexuality. In 1997, Molko reportedly said: "Sonically, we tried to capture a kind of drug-induced sexual rush". In relation to the line "Eyeholes in a paper bag/greatest lay I ever had", Molko said: "I guess it's saying you can be ugly and be an amazing lay; it doesn't really matter." The song also criticises people who think it is "fashionable to be gay"; Molko said: "In the song, I'm questioning people's reasons for sleeping with people of the same sex. In the same way that heroin is very hip today, being bisexual seems to be very chic." He also discussed being the target of homophobic abuse for his androgynous appearance, describing "Nancy Boy" as "about reclaiming those insults that were being hurled at me when I went out."

== Release ==
"Nancy Boy" was released in the UK on 20 January 1997 through Hut Records and Elevator Music. The single became an unexpected success, going straight to number four in the UK Singles Chart upon its release. The band were booked to perform the track on Top of the Pops, performing on it on 31 January 1997. On 18 May 1997, the band performed "Nancy Boy" and "Teenage Angst" on Jools Holland. Placebo had originally charted at number forty in the UK Albums Chart upon release, but, with the success of "Nancy Boy", the album then re-entered the charts in February at number five, and went gold in May.

== Reception ==
NME made the song single of the week, with writer James Oldham saying that it is "a ferociously-wired pop song", saying that "Brian Molko [is] willing to journey beyond the confined of Britpop mundanity."

== Music video ==
On 25 January, the video for "Nancy Boy" was released, directed by Howard Greenhalgh The video features the band performing the track in a colourful room with flashing lights. Images of the band members are distorted. Drummer Steve Hewitt is portrayed throughout with a blurred face because he was still contractually obligated to another band on a different label. In parts of the video, Molko's and Olsdal's faces are merged. In other cutaway scenes, there are various strange objects. In a recurring part of the video, a man's head and shoulders are seen stuck to a table with spikes coming out of it. In other parts a man lies on a bed as a strange-looking woman uses a defibrillator on him. Other scenes in the video feature a fist with legs and a bathtub full of legs.

== Live performances ==
The song was part of the band's repertoire prior to the release of their debut album and it was a regular until the Black Market Music tour. Due to the band's ambivalent relationship with the song, it's had a somewhat varied history since. The song returned to the setlist during festival performances in the latter legs of the Sleeping with Ghosts tour and was performed until the early legs of the Meds tour. After several performances during the band's stint on the 2007 Projekt Revolution tour, it was not performed again until 2010, when the song was used as the opener for the EXIT festival in Serbia. After that it became a regular opener for the rest of the Battle for the Sun tour, in the later part of 2010. On the We Come In Pieces DVD, it was the opening track on the first disc of the DVD.

== Track listings ==
UK CD1 and Australasian CD single

1. "Nancy Boy" (radio edit)
2. "Slackerbitch"
3. "Bigmouth Strikes Again"
4. "Hug Bubble" (remixed by Brad Wood)

UK CD2

1. "Nancy Boy" (sex mix)
2. "Eyesight to the Blind"
3. "Swallow" (mixed by Desiner and U-Sheen)
4. "Miss Moneypenny"

UK 7-inch single

A. "Nancy Boy" (sex mix)
B. "Slackerbitch"

Japanese mini-album

1. "Nancy Boy" (radio edit)
2. "Bruise Pristine" (radio edit)
3. "Bigmouth Strikes Again"
4. "Eyesight to the Blind"
5. "Miss Moneypenny"
6. "Swallow" (mixed by Desiner and U-Sheen)
7. "Hug Bubble" (remixed by Brad Wood)

== Charts ==
Chart (1997)	Peak position
Australia (ARIA)	158
Europe (Eurochart Hot 100)	19
Iceland (Íslenski Listinn Topp 40)	19
Scottish Singles Sales (Official Charts)	5
UK Singles (OCC)	4
UK Airplay (Music Week)	26

== Certifications ==
Region	Certification	Certified units/sales
United Kingdom (BPI)	Silver	200,000^{‡}
^{‡} Sales+streaming figures based on certification alone.

== Release history ==
Region	Date	Format(s)	Label(s)	Ref(s).
United Kingdom	20 January 1997	7-inch vinyl; CD	Elevator Music; Hut	
Japan	6 June 1997	Mini-album	Virgin	
