= Infra-Red (Placebo song) =

2006 single by Placebo

Single by Placebo

from the album Meds
- Released: 19 June 2006
- Length: 3:17
- Label: Virgin
- Songwriters: Steve Hewitt; Brian Molko; Stefan Olsdal
- Producer: Dimitri Tikovoi

Placebo singles chronology
"Song to Say Goodbye" (2006)	"Infra-Red" (2006)	"Meds" (2006)

"Infra-Red" is a song by English alternative rock band Placebo, released on 19 June 2006 as the third single from their fifth studio album Meds.

== Release ==
The song peaked at number 42 in the UK, number 35 on the U.S. Modern Rock Tracks chart and number 91 in Germany. It was nominated for the Kerrang! Award for Best Single. A live version of the song is available on the Live at La Cigale EP.

== Music video ==
Screenshot from 0:59s

The music video features businessmen apparently conspiring against the public. They observe a computer disk containing a graphic of a DNA molecule with a hazardous ligand. Meanwhile, a group of ants interfere with their computer equipment. A character, identified as a corporate executive president, gives a press conference with the help of a computerized prompter, but the ants' interference causes the prompter to say "I lied to you. We are the enemy", which the president reads.

== Track listings ==
7-inch

1. "Infra-Red"
2. "Infra-Red" (Call the Ambulance Remix)

CD

1. "Infra-Red"
2. "Infra-Red" (Hotel Persona Remix)

Maxi CD

1. "Infra-Red"
2. "Infra-Red" (The Waltmann Remix)
3. "Song to Say Goodbye" (River & Tears Remix)

DVD single

1. "Infra-Red" (video)
2. "Song to Say Goodbye" (extended video)
3. Behind the scenes footage and interviews from the "Infra-Red" video shoot
4. "Song to Say Goodbye" (River & Tears Remix)

== Charts ==
Chart performance for "Infra-Red"
Chart (2006)	Peak position
Australia (ARIA)	52
Belgium (Ultratip Bubbling Under Wallonia)	7
Germany (GfK)	75
Italy (FIMI)	40
Scotland Singles (OCC)	26
UK Singles (OCC)	42
US Alternative Airplay (Billboard)	35
