= Ashtray Heart =

Single by Placebo

from the album Battle for the Sun
- B-side: "Fuck U"
- Released: 21 September 2009
- Recorded: 2008
- Genre: Alternative rock; electronic rock
- Label: PIAS
- Songwriter(s): Steven Ludwin; Brian Molko; Jordan Page
- Producer(s): David Bottrill; Dimitri Tikovoi

Placebo singles chronology
| "The Never-Ending Why" (2009) | "Ashtray Heart" (2009) | "Bright Lights" (2010) |

"Ashtray Heart" is the third official single from Placebo's sixth studio album, Battle for the Sun. It was released in all of Europe, except for the United Kingdom and Norway, with "The Never-Ending Why" being released in these two countries a week prior (14 September 2009).

The B-side song "Fuck U" is a cover of a song by electro/alternative rock band Archive. The B-side song "Hardly Wait" is a cover of a PJ Harvey song.

"Ashtray Heart" was also the name of the band that would become Placebo. Ashtray Heart was a duo consisted of Molko and Olsdal, before they decided to try out as a serious band and began the search for a drummer.

== Track listing ==
CD single

1. "Ashtray Heart"
2. "Fuck U" (Archive cover)
3. "Hardly Wait" (PJ Harvey cover)
4. "For What It's Worth" (Losers Maximal Techmix)

iTunes digital download

1. "Ashtray Heart"
2. "Fuck U" (Archive cover)
3. "Hardly Wait" (PJ Harvey cover)
4. "For What It's Worth" (Losers Maximal Techmix)
5. "Ashtray Heart" (Video)

== Charts ==
| Chart | Peak position |
|---|---|
| Polish Radio Chart | 4 |
