= Robert Schultzberg =

Swedish musician

Klas Robert Schultzberg is a Swedish musician. He is best known as the original drummer for the English alternative rock band Placebo. Schultzberg had known Stefan Olsdal from a school band in Sweden in 1993 and joined Placebo when the band formed in September 1994. He played on their first studio demo in April 1995, which garnered much industry attention culminating in a deal with Virgin Records.

During Schultzberg's time in the band, several early works were recorded including their first 7" single "Bruise Pristine", the "Come Home" EP, the single version of "Nancy Boy" with B-sides "Slackerbitch", "Miss Moneypenny", "Bigmouth Strikes Again" and their debut album; on the track "I Know", he played the didgeridoo as well as drums. He left the band in October 1996 after a strained relationship with Brian Molko.

In June 2026, Brian Molko mentioned recently talking to Schultzberg during an interview discussing the song "36 Degrees" from the 2026 version of Placebo's eponymous 1996 debut album:

I spoke to our first drummer, Robert Schultzberg, the other day. He's out in California. He was very, very curious as to how respectful or disrespectful we'd been to his drums. And I think we've been very respectful. <...> This is such a fast song that we struggle to play it at this tempo now, today, you know, if we wanted to do the full-on rock version, you know. So it's quite difficult for a drummer to actually play it at this speed. But, you know, we were all in our early 20s. I was 21-22. Stef was 20. So was Robert at that time. So we had all that youthful exuberance and we were able to put that energy into it.

In the 2026 version of "I Know", the didgeridoo part, which was originally performed by Schultzberg, was removed.

Robert could play the digeridoo. Not very many people-- Our original drummer Robert. Not very many people can do the circular breathing that's necessary, and he wasn't a smoker. He was really, really good at it. You know, there's this joke that they say that The Beatles were so high that they even let the drummer sing. So I guess that day we were so high that we even let the drummer play his didgeridoo.
