= Phelan Kane =

Phelan Kane (born 12 April 1972, in St Albans, England) is a Berlin and London-based music producer, recording and mix engineer musician, mastering engineer and music programmer. For over thirty years he has been active in the music industry producing, programming, engineering, editing, mixing, performing, and teaching.

== Credits ==
His credits and clients include sources as diverse as Radiohead, Fad Gadget, Placebo, Depeche Mode, Moby, Amanda Ghost, Snow Patrol, Dido, Babyshambles, Elastica, Ableton, Mute, Phil Vinall, Fun-da-mental, Hut, V2, Witness, X-FM, The Drum, The Duke Spirit, One Little Indian, Sasha Skarbeck, Toyota, Aziz Ibrahim, Arista, Yamaha, Ed O’Brien, Alabama 3, Polydor, Lukas Burton, The British Film Institute, Segs Jennings, Island, PIAS, Steve Dub, dEUS, Channel 4, Titan, Phil Selway, Fangoria, Zoe, Das Pop, Beggars Banquet, Cyberdance, Boy George, Lalalover, Sony BMG, Universal, EMI and Warner Bros. He have worked at many high end (and sadly missed!) studios such as The Townhouse, Olympic, Mayfair, Livingston, Parr Street, Rockfield, Monnow Valley, The chapel, The Stone Room, Miloco Hoxton Square and Stanley House / Sofa Studios.

In 2001 Kane worked closely with pioneering synth Mute recording artist, Fad Gadget a.k.a. Frank Tovey, playing an instrumental part in Fad Gadget's support on Depeche Mode's 2001 ‘Exciter’ tour and as part of the Fad Gadget band, performing at Euro Rock in Benelux and Wembley Arena.

Kane was involved with electronic music, which continued through twenty years or so of rave culture and all its associated web of genres and styles, from the growth of Chicago House and Detroit Techno through to the birth of Drum & Bass, the invention of Tech House & the early DMZ Dubstep parties.

He ran the defunct electronic net label Meta Junction Recordings. Meta Junction was a community of London-based electronic musicians and progressive experimentalists working with classic hardware and innovative software. The community's output mixed a wide range of styles uninhibited by arbitrary labeling, marrying digital communication and new technology with analogue music production methods. The characters of Meta Junction were a broad palette – an inclusive mix of music makers and talents.

He formed Meta Function, which makes Max For Live devices alongside other devices, packs, racks and plugins that feature inspired sound design.

== Scholarly activities ==
For over twenty years he has been involved with delivering and designing contemporary popular music education at HE level. For two years he was the Head of Higher Education at BIMM in London and was instrumental in project managing the design, structure and eventual delivery of seven undergraduate Bachelor Honours degrees and two post graduate degrees in subjects such as Music Production, Songwriting, Music Business and Popular Music Performance. He has been a lecturer at BIMM London, SSR London, the Dept. of Music & Media at the University of Surrey, Tileyard Education and The London College of Music at The University of West London and he currently lectures for Deutsche Pop on their BA (Hons) Music Technology Specialist and at Catalyst Berlin on their BA (Hons) Creative Audio Production. He delivers higher education content specialising in DAW, synthesis, sampling, audio processing, sonic manipulation and electronic music production. Radiohead members Ed O'Brien and bandmate Phil Selway had music technology lessons with Phelan at Tech Music School in London in 2001.

In 2006 he completed a master's degree in Audio Technology from the London College of Music. He became one of the first wave of Ableton Certified Trainers in 2008 and in 2016 Kane completed an MSc in Sound & Music Computing at the world leading Center for Digital Music at Queen Mary, University of London. He was an active member of the UK's Music Producers Guild, holds a PgCert in Learning & Teaching, was an affiliate of the Institute for Learning, a Fellow of the Higher Education Academy and from 2017 - 2019 he was Chairman of the London Committee for the British Section of the Audio Engineering Society. In 2021 he became one of the first wave of Max MSP Certified Trainers in the world and the only one outside the US.
