= Pure Morning =

1998 single by Placebo

Single by Placebo

from the album Without You I'm Nothing
- B-side: "Mars Landing Party"; "Leeloo"; "Needledick"; "The Innocence of Sleep"
- Released: 3 August 1998
- Recorded: May 1998
- Studio: Real World (Box, Wiltshire, UK)
- Genre: Alternative rock
- Length: 3:59 (single version)
- Label: Elevator; Hut; Virgin
- Songwriters: Steve Hewitt; Brian Molko; Stefan Olsdal
- Producer: Phil Vinall

Placebo singles chronology
"Nancy Boy" (1997)	"Pure Morning" (1998)	"You Don't Care About Us" (1998)

Music video
- "Pure Morning" on YouTube

"Pure Morning" is a song by British alternative rock band Placebo, released as the lead single from their second album, Without You I'm Nothing (1998), in August 1998. Along with "Nancy Boy", it is Placebo's highest-charting single on the UK Singles Chart, peaking at number four. It is their highest charting single in the United States, reaching number 19 on the Billboard Modern Rock Tracks chart. Elsewhere, the song reached the top 50 in Australia, Canada, Iceland, Ireland and New Zealand. In October 2017, the song was certified silver by the British Phonographic Industry (BPI).

== Writing and recording ==
"Pure Morning" (1998)
"Pure Morning"

"Pure Morning" was a last-minute addition to Without You I'm Nothing, being recorded as the band prepared B-sides for the album in May, under "Nancy Boy" producer Phil Vinall. After playing with a guitar loop, they decided to develop it into a full song. Brian Molko said the lyrics were written "off the top of my head", so he only noticed their significance after recording.

Molko said that overall it was "a song about friendship", starting from the situation of "coming down when the rest of the world is waking up", such as when clubgoers get home as the sun rises and everyone else is going to work. The feeling of dislocation, "that point you feel like your life is the least sorted ever", would be solved by someone to "slip their arm around you and make slumber easier."

Molko summed up as "All you really crave is for a friend to put their arms around you and make you feel better. That's the pure morning, when that happens."

== Music video ==
The music video, directed by Nick Gordon, and shot in slow motion at the junction of Savoy Street and Savoy Hill in London, features Brian Molko as a suicidal person. Police and authorities attempt to stop him from jumping from a building to end his life. Shots of the other band members consist of them being arrested for unseen crimes. News crews report on the scene and a single police officer runs through the building to attempt to dissuade Molko from jumping. Molko eventually jumps immediately before the officer reaches him, briefly falls, then is seen landing in a standing position on the side of the building, facing the street below him. He then walks down the side of the building, astonishing everyone.

== Live performances ==
The song was a staple of the band's setlist from 1998 through to 2005. After playing it on a number of shows during the band's stint on the Projekt Revolution tour of 2007, it was not performed between 2008 and 2016. In November 2013, in an interview, Brian Molko stated that although he still likes the music, the lyrics of the song nauseate him. In October 2016, the song returned to the setlist and has opened almost every Placebo live set since.

== Track listings ==
UK CD1

1. "Pure Morning" (radio edit)
2. "Mars Landing Party"
3. "Leeloo"

UK CD2

1. "Pure Morning" (album version)
2. "Needledick"
3. "The Innocence of Sleep"

== Personnel ==
Placebo

- Brian Molko – vocals, guitar
- Stefan Olsdal – bass, guitar
- Steve Hewitt – drums, percussion

Technical personnel

- Phil Vinall – production
- Paul Corkett – additional engineering
- Jake Davies – mixing assistant
- Phelan Kane – programming
- Teo Miller – engineering
- Bunt Stafford-Clark – mastering (at Townhouse Studios, London)

== Charts ==
=== Weekly charts ===
Chart (1998–1999)	Peak position
Australia (ARIA)	49
Canada Top Singles (RPM)	34
Europe (Eurochart Hot 100)	15
Iceland (Íslenski Listinn Topp 40)	8
Ireland (IRMA)	25
Netherlands (Single Top 100)	84
New Zealand (Recorded Music NZ)	21
Scottish Singles Sales (Official Charts)	4
UK Singles (Official Charts)	4
US Alternative Airplay (Billboard)	19
US Mainstream Rock (Billboard)	40

=== Year-end charts ===
Chart (1998)	Position
Iceland (Íslenski Listinn Topp 40)	73
UK Singles (OCC)	152

Chart (1999)	Position
US Modern Rock Tracks (Billboard)	54

== Certifications ==
Region	Certification	Certified units/sales
New Zealand (RMNZ)	Gold	15,000^{‡}
United Kingdom (BPI)	Silver	200,000^{‡}
^{‡} Sales+streaming figures based on certification alone.

== Release history ==
Region	Date	Format(s)	Label(s)	Ref.
United Kingdom	3 August 1998	CD	Elevator; Hut; Virgin	
United States	5 October 1998	Active rock radio	Hut; Virgin	

== In popular culture ==
"Pure Morning" has been featured often in British television advertisements. The song was included on the soundtrack to the film The Chumscrubber (2005). The song was covered by the project of Johnathon Sharp, Biotek, on their album Punishment for Decadence. The intro is featured in an episode of Daria, and it was also used in the Top Gear 2001 J.D. Power Survey, revealing the Lexus LS400.
