= Because I Want You =

2006 single by Placebo

Single by Placebo
- Released: 6 March 2006
- Genre: Alternative rock
- Length: 3:21
- Label: Virgin
- Songwriter(s): Steve Hewitt; Brian Molko; Stefan Olsdal

Placebo singles chronology
"Twenty Years" (2004)	"Because I Want You" (2006)	"Song to Say Goodbye" (2006)

Professional ratings
Review scores
Source	Rating
Hot Press	favourable

"Because I Want You" is a song by English alternative rock band Placebo, released as the first UK single from their 2006 album Meds – in territories outside the UK, the single was substituted by "Song to Say Goodbye".

== Release ==
In the UK, it peaked at number 13 in the UK Singles Chart, staying in the charts for three weeks. It was the band's final top 20 hit to date. The song was also the first Placebo single to be given a download release with a track unavailable on the various physical releases.

== Track listing ==
2-track CD/7" vinyl
No.	Title	Length
1.	"Because I Want You"	3:21
2.	"Because I Want You (Remixed by Russell Lissack of Bloc Party)"	4:26

CD
No.	Title	Length
1.	"Because I Want You"	3:21
2.	"36 Degrees 2005 (Recorded live at Wembley Arena)"	5:03
3.	"Because I Want You (Ladytron Club Mix)"	7.04
4.	"Because I Want You (video)"	3:38
5.	"Because I Want You: Behind The Scenes (video)"	2:00

Digital download
No.	Title	Length
1.	"Because I Want You"	3:21
2.	"Because I Want You (Ladytron Club Mix)"	7:04
3.	"Because I Want You (Demo Version)"	4.05
4.	"Because I Want You (Instrumental)"	3:21
5.	"Because I Want You (Remixed by Russell Lissack of Bloc Party)"	4:26
