= Come Home (Placebo song) =

Single by Placebo

from the album Placebo
- Released: 5 February 1996
- Recorded: 1996
- Genre: Alternative rock, pop-punk, emo
- Length: 4:40
- Label: Deceptive
- Songwriter(s): Robert Schultzberg, Brian Molko and Stefan Olsdal
- Producer(s): Brad Wood

Placebo singles chronology
"Bruise Pristine" (1995)	"Come Home" (1996)	"36 Degrees" (1996)

"Come Home" is a song by English alternative rock band Placebo. It appears on the group's 1996 eponymous debut album and was released as the lead single from the album on 5 February 1996.

== Content ==
Placebo frontman Brian Molko has described "Come Home" was "pop-punk for postponed suicides".

== Music video ==
The music video for the song features the band performing the song in a small room.

== Release ==
"Come Home" was released as the lead single from Placebo on 5 February 1996. It reached number 86 in the UK Singles Chart.

== Track listing ==
CD

1. "Come Home" – 4:40
2. "Drowning by Numbers" – 2:59
3. "Oxygen Thief" – 3:36

7" vinyl

1. "Come Home"
2. "Drowning by Numbers"

== Personnel ==
Placebo

- Brian Molko – vocals, guitar, production
- Stefan Olsdal – bass, production
- Robert Schultzberg – drums, production

Additional personnel

- Fulton Dingley – engineering on tracks 1 & 2
- Miki Moore – engineering on track 3
- Adam Maynard – front cover art
- Alex Weston – back cover photography

== Charts ==
Chart (1996)	Peak position
UK Singles Chart	86
