= Steve Forrest (musician) =

American drummer

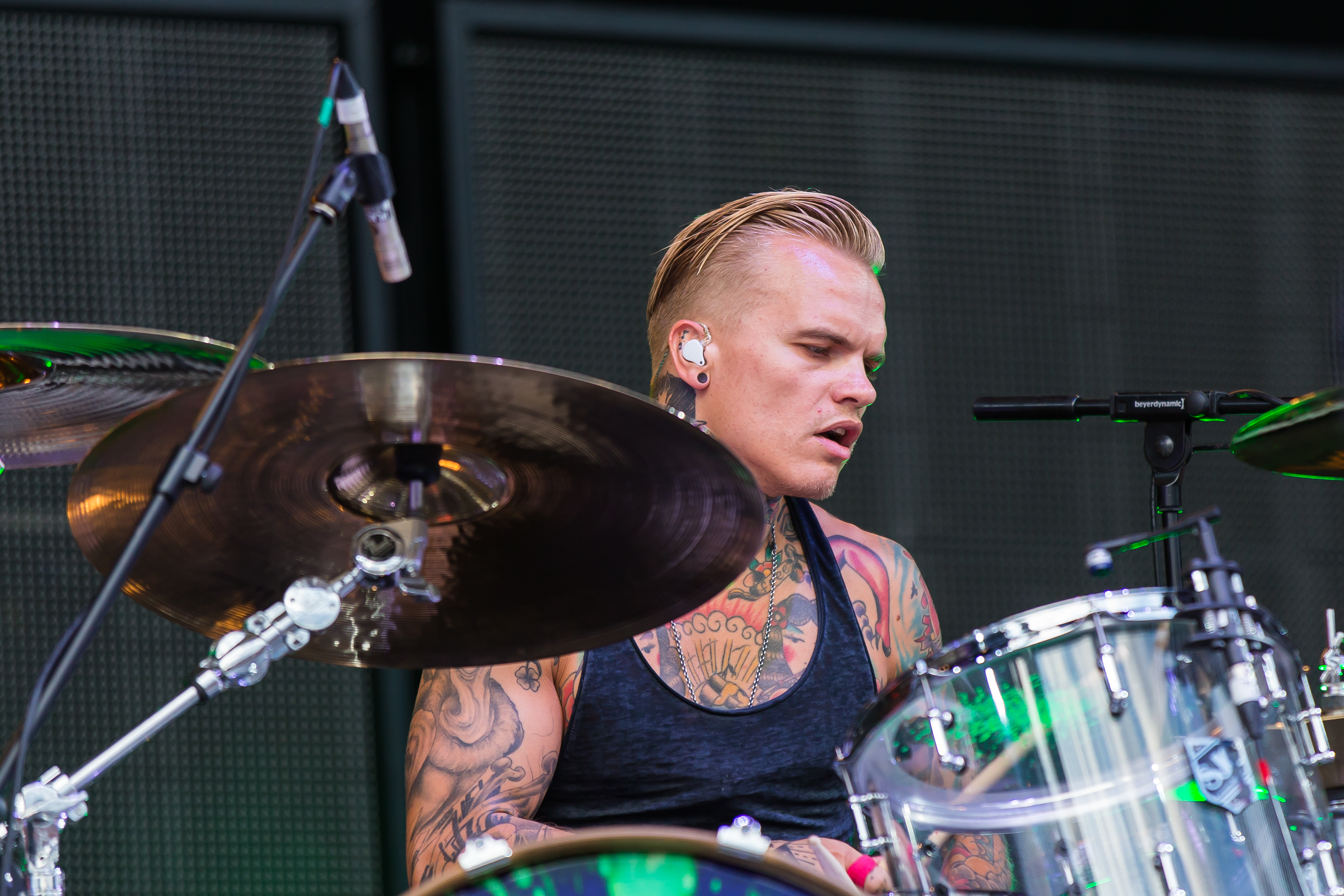
- Forrest with Placebo in 2014

Background information
- Born: September 25, 1986 (age 39); Modesto, California, United States
- Genres: Alternative rock
- Instruments: Drums, percussion, xylophone, guitar, vocals
- Formerly of: Placebo; Planes; Evaline; É Florentino

Steve Forrest (born September 25, 1986) is an American drummer from Modesto, California, best known for his work with the British alternative rock band Placebo, which he left in 2015. Before joining Placebo, Forrest was drummer for the ambient rock band Evaline. He announced his intention to leave Evaline in January 2007, but remained with the band throughout their 2007 United States tour. During that tour, Evaline opened for Placebo, and Forrest came to be acquainted with them. In 2008 he took the vacant seat of Steve Hewitt. Unlike Placebo's previous two drummers, Forrest plays right-handed, not left. His first set with Placebo for "Live at Angkor Wat" in Cambodia, was his most memorable gig. Forrest was Placebo's drummer for two consecutive album tours, the Battle For The Sun tour and the Loud Like Love tour. He also contributed backing vocals live and in the studio.

In February 2015 it was announced that Forrest left Placebo, reportedly in order to concentrate on his own musical career, including as the frontman and songwriter for the band Planes, which he founded in London during the time he was with Placebo.

In early 2016, Forrest was forced to disband Planes, and relocate back to the United States due to difficulties surrounding his UK visa. In a public blog, his then wife, Xarah Xavier stated: "Despite paying his 40% tax bracket for the whole of these 8 years the disgraceful nature of what the UK has now declared their IMMIGRATION LAW has forced us to re-locate to the fast paced, bright lights and creative urban community of LOS ANGELES. Thank you Tories. I salute you."
