= Meds (album) =

Studio album by Placebo
- Released: 13 March 2006
- Recorded: December 2005 – January 2006
- Studio: RAK Studios, Livingston Studios and Sarm West Studios, London, England; Angel Recording Studios; Snake Ranch
- Genre: Alternative rock
- Length: 47:55
- Label: Virgin
- Producer: Dimitri Tikovoï

Placebo chronology
Once More with Feeling: Singles 1996–2004 (2004)	Meds (2006)	Extended Play '07 (2007)

Singles from Meds
- 1. "Because I Want You" Released: 6 March 2006 (UK only); 2. "Song to Say Goodbye" Released: 6 March 2006; 3. "Infra-Red" Released: 19 June 2006; 4. "Meds" Released: 9 October 2006

Meds is the fifth studio album by British alternative rock band Placebo. It was recorded from late 2005 to early 2006 and released on 13 March 2006 by record label Virgin in most countries, although it was released three days earlier in Australia and New Zealand. Illegal copies had previously been available on the Internet since 17 January 2006.

Meds reached number 7 in the UK Albums Chart, and received a generally favourable reaction from music critics. It also became Placebo's first album to chart on the US Billboard 200, where it reached number 180. Four singles were released from the album: "Because I Want You", "Song to Say Goodbye", "Infra-Red" and "Meds". This is the band's final album to feature drummer Steve Hewitt.

== Content ==
Placebo had planned to record a more electronic, keyboard-driven sound for their new album; however, producer Dimitri Tikovoi suggested a back-to-basics approach, which Brian Molko recounted in Zero:

It was our producer's agenda really, which we didn't really know about until we got into the studio. [...] We were in a place that was very much about samplers and computers and vintage synthesizers. This recording session really became about playing again. We were in an old-school studio so there were no real tricks to hide behind.

On the theme of the record, Molko says:

I think there's a lot of songs about the dangers and effects of drinking [alcohol]. [...] "Infra-Red"'s about that, when you get very drunk and you've got a bee in your bonnet about something, and this vengeful quality emerges. You start thinking about people who've done you wrong and [want] to set the record straight.

== Release ==
Meds was released 13 March 2006 worldwide, although it was released three days earlier in Australia and New Zealand. Illegal copies had previously been available on the Internet since 17 January 2006. It reached number 7 in the UK Albums Chart.

The album was re-released by Virgin in the US in January 2007 with three extra tracks—"Lazarus", "UNEEDMEMORETHANINEEDU" (both B-sides to the "Meds" single) and "Running Up That Hill"—and "In the Cold Light of Morning" omitted (because it contains "dirty words"). The album was released with the Copy Control protection system in some regions. The Chilean two-disc edition includes a bonus disc of live tracks recorded at the Centro Cultural Estación Mapocho, Santiago on 1 and 2 April 2005, entitled Live in Chile.

The American release version has different arrangements of various tracks and the profanity in "Post Blue" is censored.

== Reception ==
Professional ratings
Aggregate scores
Source	Rating
Metacritic	65/100
Review scores
Source	Rating
AllMusic	3.5/5 stars
Alternative Press	4/5 stars
Robert Christgau	mixed
Mojo	3/5 stars
NME	8/10
Pitchfork	5.1/10
PopMatters	4/10
Q	3/5 stars
Rolling Stone	3/5 stars
Slant	3/5 stars

Meds received a generally favourable reception from critics, though several reviewers commented on the album's lack of divergence from the group's established sound.

Pitchfork reviewer Joe Tangari opined "the arrangements and recordings are so airtight you could suffocate in them, with the distortion strictly compressed and neatly controlled". Tangari finished by commenting "Meds isn't a terrible album, but there's very little to get excited about on it either, and Placebo's calculated naughtiness is no more convincing than it's ever been." Jonathan Keefe of Slant wrote "Meds finds a successful band doing just a little to tinker with their proven formula [...] and attempting to pass off a few too many soundalike tracks as thematic coherence". Dan Raper of PopMatters wrote "Meds is cloaked in the sophisticated sheen of a band completely established; pushing in some areas, content to rely on established constructions and melodic elements in others. If you haven't experienced the familiar cycle of infatuation–disappointment–indifference with Placebo, you could find these songs pleasant, at times even exhilarating. But I've just reached the final stage of that cycle, and nothing here forces me to reconsider."

MacKenzie Wilson of AllMusic called Meds "as bare and honest as Placebo have ever been, thanks to French producer Dimitri Tikovoi's straightforward approach in getting the band to make a bona fide rock record", writing that "There's a fresh vulnerability here and a sense of danger, too". Robert Christgau, while mixed in his reception, called Meds "easily their most effective album-as-album", while Q magazine called it "easily their most focused album to date". musicOMH wrote "Darker than its predecessors, the harrowing Meds is as close Placebo have come to that perfect album."

Speaking to Kerrang! in June 2009, Brian Molko remembered: "This was the beginning of the end of the band [drummer Steve Hewitt left after its release] and the way we dealt with that was by anaesthetizing ourselves to the max. When Stef and I hear tracks from the album we look at each other and go, 'Erm… who played what on this song?' There are moments on there like "[In the] Cold Light of Morning," that are painful to listen to now. I don't know that we've ever been that down before. I think it's a very powerful record, emotionally, and despite the circumstances under which it was made, it's quite perfectly executed. It's just very dark and doesn't offer very much hope."

== Track listing ==
All tracks are written by Placebo (Brian Molko, Stefan Olsdal and Steve Hewitt), except "Running Up That Hill", written by Kate Bush.

No.	Title	Length
1.	"Meds" (featuring Alison Mosshart)	2:55
2.	"Infra-Red"	3:15
3.	"Drag"	3:21
4.	"Space Monkey"	3:51
5.	"Follow the Cops Back Home"	4:39
6.	"Post Blue"	3:11
7.	"Because I Want You"	3:22
8.	"Blind"	4:01
9.	"Pierrot the Clown"	4:22
10.	"Broken Promise" (featuring Michael Stipe)	4:11
11.	"One of a Kind"	3:21
12.	"In the Cold Light of Morning"	3:52
13.	"Song to Say Goodbye"	3:34
Total length:		47:55

Japanese edition bonus track
No.	Title	Length
14.	"Twenty Years" (Live at Wembley, 5 November 2004)	6:07

USA version
No.	Title	Length
1.	"Meds" (featuring Alison Mosshart)	2:55
2.	"Infra-Red"	3:15
3.	"Drag"	3:21
4.	"Space Monkey"	3:51
5.	"Follow the Cops Back Home"	4:39
6.	"Post Blue (Radio Edit)"	3:11
7.	"Because I Want You"	3:22
8.	"Blind"	4:01
9.	"Lazarus"	3:23
10.	"Broken Promise" (featuring Michael Stipe)	4:11
11.	"One of a Kind"	3:21
12.	"Pierrot the Clown"	4:22
13.	"Song to Say Goodbye"	3:34
14.	"UNEEDMEMORETHANINEEDU"	3:29
15.	"Running Up That Hill" (Kate Bush cover)	4:53

Live in Chile bonus CD
No.	Title	Length
1.	"This Picture"
2.	"Special Needs"
3.	"Protect Me from What I Want"
4.	"I Do"
5.	"Black-Eyed"
6.	"Pure Morning"
7.	"English Summer Rain"
8.	"Twenty Years"
9.	"Nancy Boy"

Special Edition bonus DVD

- Lyrics in virtual booklet
- "The Death of Nancy Boy" (documentary) – 8:51
- "Twenty Years" (live at Wembley 05.11.04) (video) – 6:05
- "If Only Tonight We Could Sleep" (featuring The Cure) (video) – 4:06
- "Backstage at Live 8" – 4:19
- "Long Division" – 2:44
- "In the Cold Light of Morning" (demo) – 4:27
- "I Do" (demo) – 2:32
- "Pierrot the Clown" (demo) – 4:58

== Personnel ==
Placebo

- Brian Molko – guitar, lead vocals, keyboards
- Stefan Olsdal – bass, backing vocals, guitar, keyboard
- Steve Hewitt – drums

Additional personnel

- Alison Mosshart – vocals on track 1
- Michael Stipe – vocals
- Natalia Bonner – violin on tracks 4, 9 and 13
- Ian Burge – cello on tracks 4, 9 and 13
- Sarah Button – violin on tracks 4, 9 and 13
- Krista Caspersz – violin on tracks 4, 9 and 13
- Reiad Ceibah – viola on tracks 4, 9 and 13
- Fiona Griffiths – viola on tracks 4, 9 and 13
- Gita Langley – violin on tracks 4, 9 and 13
- Vicky Matthews – cello on tracks 4, 9 and 13
- Jessie Murphy – violin on tracks 4, 9 and 13
- Emma Owens – viola on tracks 4, 9 and 13
- Tom Piggot-Smith – violin on tracks 4, 9 and 13
- Helen Rathbone – cello on tracks 4, 9 and 13
- Katherine Shave – viola on tracks 4, 9 and 13
- Ellie Stanford – violin on tracks 4, 9 and 13
- Deborah White – violin on tracks 4, 9 and 13
- Lucy Wilkins – violin on tracks 4, 9 and 13
- Dave Williams – violin on tracks 4, 9 and 13
- Sarah Willson – cello on tracks 4, 9 and 13
- Fiona Brice – string arrangement on tracks 4, 9 and 13

Technical

- Dimitri Tikovoï – production
- Flood – mixing on tracks 1, 3–6, 8, 9 and 11–13
- Dave Bascombe – mixing on tracks 7 and 10
- James Brown – engineering, mixing on track 2
- Alex Cowper – album design
- Steve Mustarde – engineering assistance at Livingston Studios, London
- Dan Porter – engineering assistance at Townhouse Studios
- Mark Neary – engineering assistance at Snake Ranch
- Rob Smith – engineering assistance at Sarm West Studios
- Richard Woodcraft – engineering assistance at RAK Studios, London
- Raj Das – engineering assistance at RAK Studios
- Tim Young – audio mastering at Metropolis Studios, London
- Marcelo Aldunate – mastering of Live in Chile
- Rubén Cartagena – mixing and recording of Live in Chile
- Daniel Escobar – recording assistance of Live in Chile
- Gonzalo González – mastering of Live in Chile
- Ewen Bremner – documentary film direction and editing
- Side – documentary film sound services
- Kal Weber – documentary film photography and production
- Quinn Williams – documentary film editing
- Gresby Nash – documentary film sound mixing
- Paul Corkett – production on DVD track 6
- Des Fallon – production on DVD track 3
- Nick Fry – direction on DVD track 3
- Pascal Klein – photography on DVD track 5
- Renaud Le Van Kim – direction on DVD track 4
- Placebo – production on DVD track 6
- Simon Williams – editing on DVD track 5

== Charts ==
=== Weekly charts ===
Chart (2006)	Peak position
Australian Albums (ARIA)	4
Austrian Albums (Ö3 Austria)	1
Belgian Albums (Ultratop Flanders)	1
Belgian Albums (Ultratop Wallonia)	1
Canadian Albums (Nielsen SoundScan)	95
Danish Albums (Hitlisten)	20
Dutch Albums (Album Top 100)	10
Finnish Albums (Suomen virallinen lista)	3
French Albums (SNEP)	1
German Albums (Offizielle Top 100)	2
Greek Albums (IFPI)	3
Hungarian Albums (MAHASZ)	25
Irish Albums (IRMA)	21
Italian Albums (FIMI)	4
Mexican Albums (AMPROFON)	1
New Zealand Albums (RMNZ)	24
Norwegian Albums (VG-lista)	12
Polish Albums (ZPAV)	10
Portuguese Albums (AFP)	3
Scottish Albums (Official Charts)	6
Spanish Albums (Promusicae)	27
Swedish Albums (Sverigetopplistan)	33
Swiss Albums (Schweizer Hitparade)	1
UK Albums (Official Charts)	7
US Billboard 200	180
US Heatseekers Albums (Billboard)	9

=== Year-end charts ===
Chart (2006)	Position
Austrian Albums (Ö3 Austria)	35
Belgian Albums (Ultratop Flanders)	19
Belgian Albums (Ultratop Wallonia)	8
French Albums (SNEP)	34
German Albums (Offizielle Top 100)	33
Swiss Albums (Schweizer Hitparade)	36

== Certifications ==
Region	Certification	Certified units/sales
Austria (IFPI Austria)	Gold	15,000^{*}
Belgium (BRMA)	Gold	25,000^{*}
France (SNEP)	Platinum	200,000^{*}
Germany (BVMI)	Platinum	200,000^{^}
Greece (IFPI Greece)	Gold	7,500^{^}
Russia (NFPF)	Gold	10,000^{*}
Switzerland (IFPI Switzerland)	Platinum	30,000^{^}
United Kingdom (BPI)	Gold	100,000^{^}
Summaries
Worldwide	—	1,100,000
^{*} Sales figures based on certification alone.^{^} Shipments figures based on certification alone.
