= Stefan Olsdal =

Swedish-Luxembourgish musician

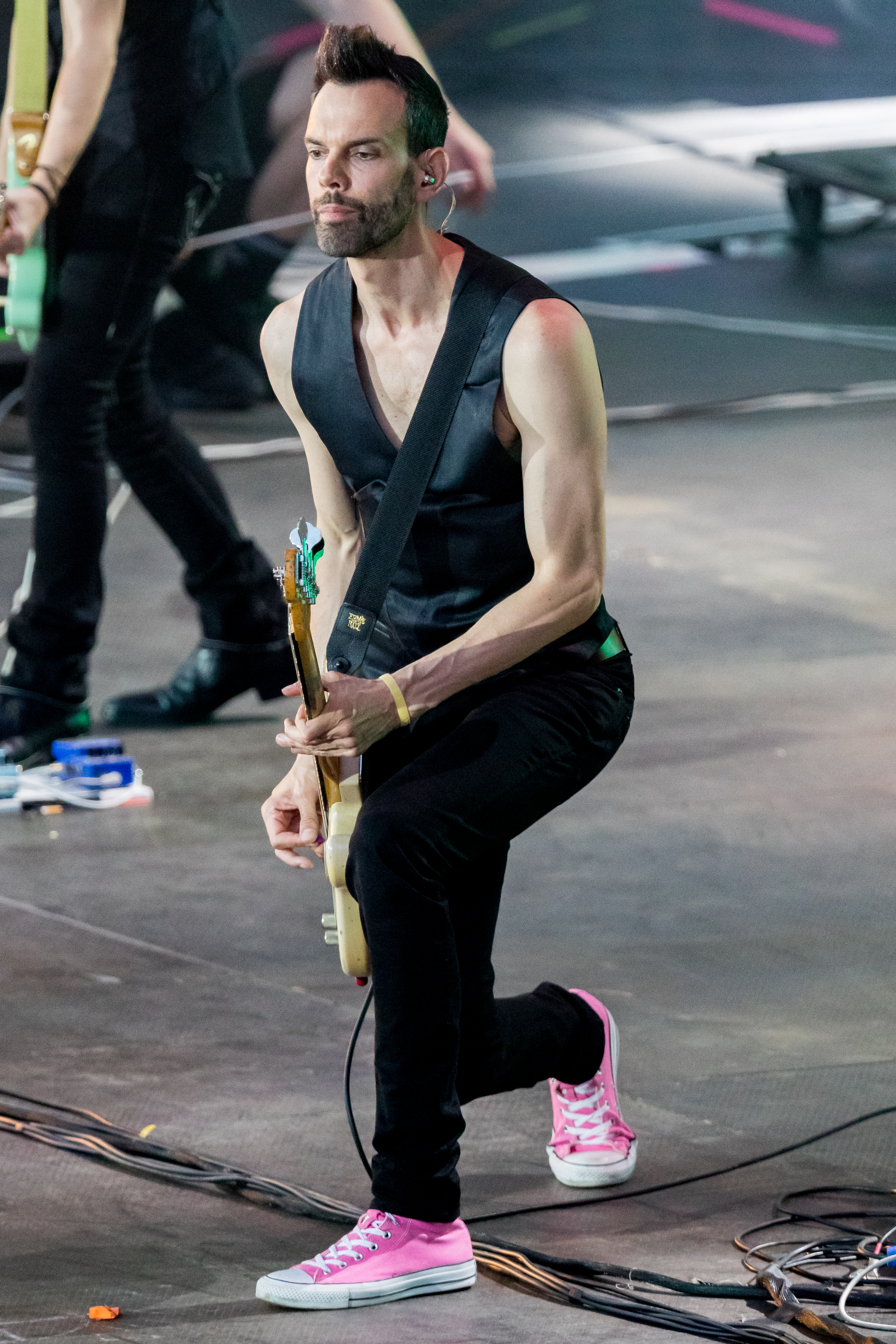
- Olsdal performing with Placebo in 2022

Background information
- Born: Bo Stefan Alexander Olsdal; 31 March 1974 (age 52); Gothenburg, Sweden
- Genres: Alternative rock, electronic
- Instruments: Bass; guitar; piano; keyboards; double bass; vocals
- Years active: 1992–present
- Labels: current: Elevator Lady Ltd, past: Universal Germany, EMI, Virgin Records, PIAS, Hut Records, Caroline Records
- Website: placeboworld.co.uk

Bo Stefan Alexander Olsdal (born 31 March 1974) is a Swedish-Luxembourgish musician, best known as the bassist/guitarist of the alternative rock band Placebo, he is also part of the electronic band Digital 21 + Stefan Olsdal and launched the electronic/dance remix at Hotel Persona.

== Biography ==
Olsdal was born in Gothenburg, Sweden. His family moved to Luxembourg when he was young and went to the American International School of Luxembourg along with fellow band member Brian Molko (though the two did not cross paths at this time). Olsdal began playing music in his school's orchestra in 1987. He completed his high school education in Sweden and moved to London in 1993, where he attended the Musicians Institute.

He is openly gay. He came out publicly in an interview in Melody Maker in 1996. Olsdal and his partner David Amen have a son.

In 2013, he mixed the EP "El Encanto" of Lantana and produced two of the songs of the album, also playing some of the synthesisers, bass and guitars. He also did a lot of the programming for the album.

In 2016 Olsdal produced 'La Chica Con Los Ojos Dorados', and the Fangoria album "Canciones Para Robots Romanticos" as well as the release of the debut album "Inside" from his band Digital 21 + Stefan Olsdal.

He has worked as producer, arranger, musician and mixer on an LP by Lantana.

In 2018, Olsdal revealed on his official Facebook page that he had applied to become a British citizen.

== Placebo ==
Olsdal met Molko by chance outside South Kensington tube station in 1994. The two of them formed Ashtray Heart, a lo-fi duo, playing mostly on toy instruments. They wrote four songs, but decided to try out as a serious band, so they invited Steve Hewitt who could not be in the band because he was already signed to another record company. After that, Olsdal invited old schoolmate Robert Schultzberg (who was at the time studying in UK) to join as Placebo's drummer (Hewitt would later replace him as the full-time drummer).

Together with Molko, he is credited as co-author on every Placebo song to date (except "Ashtray Heart" from Battle for the Sun) and co-produced Black Market Music and some b-sides.

== Hotel Persona ==
Hotel Persona began when Olsdal and David Amen started providing dance tunes to friends' house parties; Javier Solo was recruited to sing Spanish vocals, and Olsdal sang the English versions. As the music was coming together, Olsdal and Amen did DJ work under the Hotel Persona name in such locations as Milan, Paris, London, Barcelona and Rio. They have also remixed songs by various bands, including Queens of the Stone Age, Placebo and She Wants Revenge.

Their debut album In the Clouds was recorded and mixed in London, Madrid and New York over two years and features a wide array of additional vocals from various artists including Brian Molko, Samantha Fox, Miguel Bosé and Alaska of Fangoria.

In 2007, they remixed the song "Siempre" for Lantana.

== Digital 21 + Stefan Olsdal ==
In 2012, Stefan Olsdal created with the Spanish electro music veteran Digital 21 (Miguel Lopez Mora) Digital 21 + Stefan Olsdal.

Being two huge fans of electro and classical music, they decided to mix these two kinds of music. So, they incorporate a string quartet (and other more usual instruments) in their electro creations and during their concerts, creating an experimental aspect to their collaboration.

Together, they firstly created an EP, Rebellion EP. Then, they released 2 albums, Inside (2017) and Complex (2021), the last one having been a victim of many deferments because of the COVID-19 pandemic. In these two albums, they highlighted feminine voices as Margret Rang (Vök), Helen Feng (Nova Heart), Cuushe, Julienne Dessagne (Fantastic Twins), Caroline Devine, Katrína Mogensen, Soleil and Alissa Janine Wollman.

During their several years of collaboration, the band created many instrumental compositions taking away from their usual compositions. In 2020, they decided to create a different project called Made For Humans. Their wish was to create songs having their own identity to permit people who listen to them to get away. According to them, "music allows us to travel". They released their first album and a first EP the same year. A second album, Made For Humans II, was released on 17 November 2023.

== Production ==
- 2017: Inside by Digital 21 + Stefan Olsdal: producer
- 2016: Sinestesia (bonus track) from the album Canciones Para Robots Románticos by Fangoria: producer
- 2015: La Chica de los Ojos Dorados (LP) by Lantalba: producer, musician and mixing
- 2013: El Encanto (EP) by Lantana: musician and mixer
- 2013: "La noche de los muertos vivientes" (single) by Lantana: producer, musician, mixing and mastering
- 2008: Into The Clouds by Hotel Persona: producer
- 2007: "Siempre – Hotel Persona" (remix) by Lantana: remixer

== Remixes ==
- Lantana "Siempre" Hotel Persona Remix
- She Wants Revenge "I Want To Tear You Apart" Hotel Persona Remix
- Placebo "Infra-Red" Hotel Persona Remix
- Placebo "I Do" (Material Mix) Remix (Placebo – I Do (Material Mix) (Once More With Feeling (Singles 1996–2004) Mexican Limited Edition Album)

== Equipment ==
Olsdal uses a variety of instruments, including a Gibson Thunderbird (three: one vintage used since 2003, one modern black which replaced the Flying V in 2006 and one white used since 2009), Fender Jazz Bass, Fender Bass VI, Gibson Les Paul Custom and a Gretsch Anniversary. In live versions of "Teenage Angst", "Centrefolds" and most acoustic performances he used a Technics keyboard. During the Meds era, he also used an Epiphone Flying V Bass for live performances of "Nancy Boy", "Come Home" and other occasional songs (mostly rarely played songs from the first album), which appeared on the "Infra-Red" video, although this guitar was smashed by Olsdal at the end of their 2006 Reading Festival set. He is seen playing an olympic white Fender Jaguar Bass in the "For What It's Worth" video, and played a white Rickenbacker bass in live performance on television programs. He has also been playing a Charger bass, built by the luthiers TAO Guitars in Brussels.

His amplification is a mixture of Ampeg (for basses) and Marshall (for guitars) amplifiers. He also played the xylophone in acoustic performances of some songs from Meds ("Pierrot The Clown", "Post Blue"). In Hotel Persona live shows he mostly uses a Fender Telecaster also used when performing "Scared of Girls", "Slave to the Wage" and "Evil Dildo". In the early years (1994–1996) he used Boss bass pedals when playing live, but this practice ended after Bill Lloyd became a full-time touring member.

For the Loud Like Love tour, Olsdal's pedalboard (with separate guitar and bass signal chains) included the Electro-Harmonix Memory Boy analog delay, Electro-Harmonix Micro Q-Tron envelope filter, MXR Slash Octave Fuzz distortion, TC Electronic Hall of Fame reverb, Boss TR-2 tremolo, Electro-Harmonix POG octave generator, MXR Micro Amp booster, Roger Mayer Voodoo-Vibe Jr chorus and vibrato, Boss PS-6 Harmonist harmony shifter, two Boss TU-3 Chromatic Tuner units (one for guitar and one for bass), Electro-Harmonix Stereo Memory Man with Hazarai digital delay/looper, Boss DD-3 digital delay, Electro-Harmonix LPB-2ube stereo tube preamp, Electro-Harmonix Bass Big Muff Pi distortion, Electro-Harmonix Bass Micro Synthesizer analog microsynth and Ernie Ball VP Jr 250K volume pedal.

Olsdal contributes backing vocals sparingly in Placebo's live performances and recordings as well as lead and backup vocals on most Hotel Persona tracks.
