= Lose Your Way (album) =

Studio album by Love Amongst Ruin
- Released: 29 June 2015
- Recorded: 2011–2012 at Moles Studios (Bath, Somerset), Old Laundry (Winchester, Hampshire)
- Genres: Alternative rock, hard rock
- Label: Ancient B Records
- Producer: Dan Austin

Love Amongst Ruin chronology
Love Amongst Ruin (2010)	Lose Your Way (2015)

Singles from Love Amongst Ruin
- 1. "Lose Your Way" Released: 11 May 2015; 2. "Modern War Song" Released: 24 July 2015; 3. "So Close" Released: 6 November 2015

Lose Your Way is the second studio album by the British rock band Love Amongst Ruin. It was released by Ancient B Records on 29 June 2015 and has been described as "an album from an artist over the hump; head high to the future and all engines gunning."

== Background ==
=== Writing and recording ===
Writing for Love Amongst Ruin's second album began midway through the tour supporting their self-titled debut album in January 2011. Just prior to the end of the tour the following June, frontman Steve Hewitt revealed that the band had written nine songs and planned to begin recording in September 2011. In November, Hewitt revealed that the band had been recording at Moles Studio in Bath, the location of the majority of recording for the band's debut album. Writing was completed in March 2012 and recordings continued at Moles Studio, with Hewitt and guitarists Donald Ross Skinner and Steve Hove handling playing duties, with Paul Corkett engineering. Corkett later put Hewitt and Skinner in touch with producer Dan Austin, a frequent production partner of Gil Norton. Austin was given a trial run at producing the title track, which he "nailed" and was asked to produce the whole album. The entire process was completed in two-and-a-half months.

Perry Bamonte featured on bass on the album after being announced as having joined the band in September 2012. Early composition "Oh God" was recorded for the album, after having been performed live at the London Scala in June 2010 and prepared for an EP in 2012, which failed to see release. A cover of Six by Seven's "So Close" was recorded for the album, prior to Hewitt joining the said band in 2013. Despite initially not wishing to record a cover, Hewitt and Austin felt the track fitted the vibe of the album and set out "to make it the song it never really was". Former member Laurie Ross returned to provide cello and programming for the album. Hewitt recalled that the troublesome vocal melody for "Menace Ballad" was completed by local Bath musician Nick Walker.

=== Themes ===
Of the album's title and title track, Hewitt said "it’s how your perceptions change as you go through life. Do you actually know where you’re fucking going? It’s trying to explain life’s difficult path". Hewitt also revealed that he consciously made a decision to write about experiences outside the personal nature prevalent on the debut album, saying "it's a difficult thing to do and a huge departure mentally and it's something I find exciting. There are still personal songs on the record, but it's more about the human condition rather than what's being inflicted by others". Closing track "Oh God" was written by Hewitt as a reaction to the shock of hearing the news of the death of his friend Stuart Cable in 2010. "Modern War Song" deals with the subject of Western imperialism and how "revolting soldiers are treated when their service finishes after signing up and fighting for their country". Hewitt revealed that there isn't a constant theme running through the album, instead "the album is more of a soundscape".

=== Delay and release ===
Lose Your Way was put on the back burner after guitarist Steve Hove quit the band shortly before a comeback show at the London Barfly on 10 September 2012. Hewitt subsequently joined Six by Seven for its Love and Peace and Sympathy album and tour in 2013 and produced records by former Love Amongst Ruin opening bands Lys and Spiral 69. The Lose Your Way album title and track list were revealed in April 2015,> with a release date of 29 June 2015. The release of the album was preceded by the "Lose Your Way" EP on 11 May 2015 and was followed by the "Modern War Song" and "So Close" EPs respectively on 24 July and 6 November. By April 2021, the album had gone silver.

== Reception ==
Professional ratings
Review scores
Source	Rating
CDStarts	7/10 stars
Gigslutz	3/5 stars
GIGSoup	4/5 stars
Kerrang!	4/5 stars
NME	7/10 stars
Powermetal.de	6/10 stars
Renowned for Sound	4/5 stars
Shout 4 Music	8/10 stars
Sound of Brit	8/10 stars

NME gave the album 7/10, saying that the album was "lovely, but ruinous". Cryptic Rock gave the album full marks and said Hewitt had achieved a "smorgasbord" and "cornucopia of sound". Kerrang! awarded the album 4/5, saying Hewitt's ejection from Placebo "may well have been a blessing in disguise".

== Track listing ==
No.	Title	Writer(s)	Length
1.	"Lose Your Way"	Steve Hewitt & Donald Ross Skinner	3:20
2.	"Modern War Song"	Steve Hewitt & Steve Hove	4:54
3.	"Watch Myself"	Steve Hewitt & Donald Ross Skinner	4:34
4.	"Swan Killer"	Steve Hewitt & Steve Hove	3:12
5.	"Paper Tigers"	Steve Hewitt & Steve Hove	4:06
6.	"So Close"	Chris Olley, James Flower, Chris Davis, Paul Douglas	4:30
7.	"Menace Ballad"	Steve Hewitt & Donald Ross Skinner	4:19
8.	"Oh God"	Steve Hewitt	6:01

iTunes bonus tracks

No.	Title	Length
9.	"Lose Your Way Revision"	6:14
10.	"Swan Killer Revision"	6:27

== Personnel ==
- Steve Hewitt – vocals, drums, bass, guitar, piano
- Donald Ross Skinner – guitar, bass, keyboards
- Steve Hove – guitar
- Laurie Ross – cello, programming
- Beth Porter – cello
- James SK Wān – glockenspiel
- Perry Bamonte – bass

== Production ==
- Production, engineering – Dan Austin
- Additional engineering – Paul Corkett
- Mixing – Dan Austin, Steve Hewitt, Donald Ross Skinner
- Mastering – Brian Gardner
- Additional mastering – Paul Walton

== Tour ==
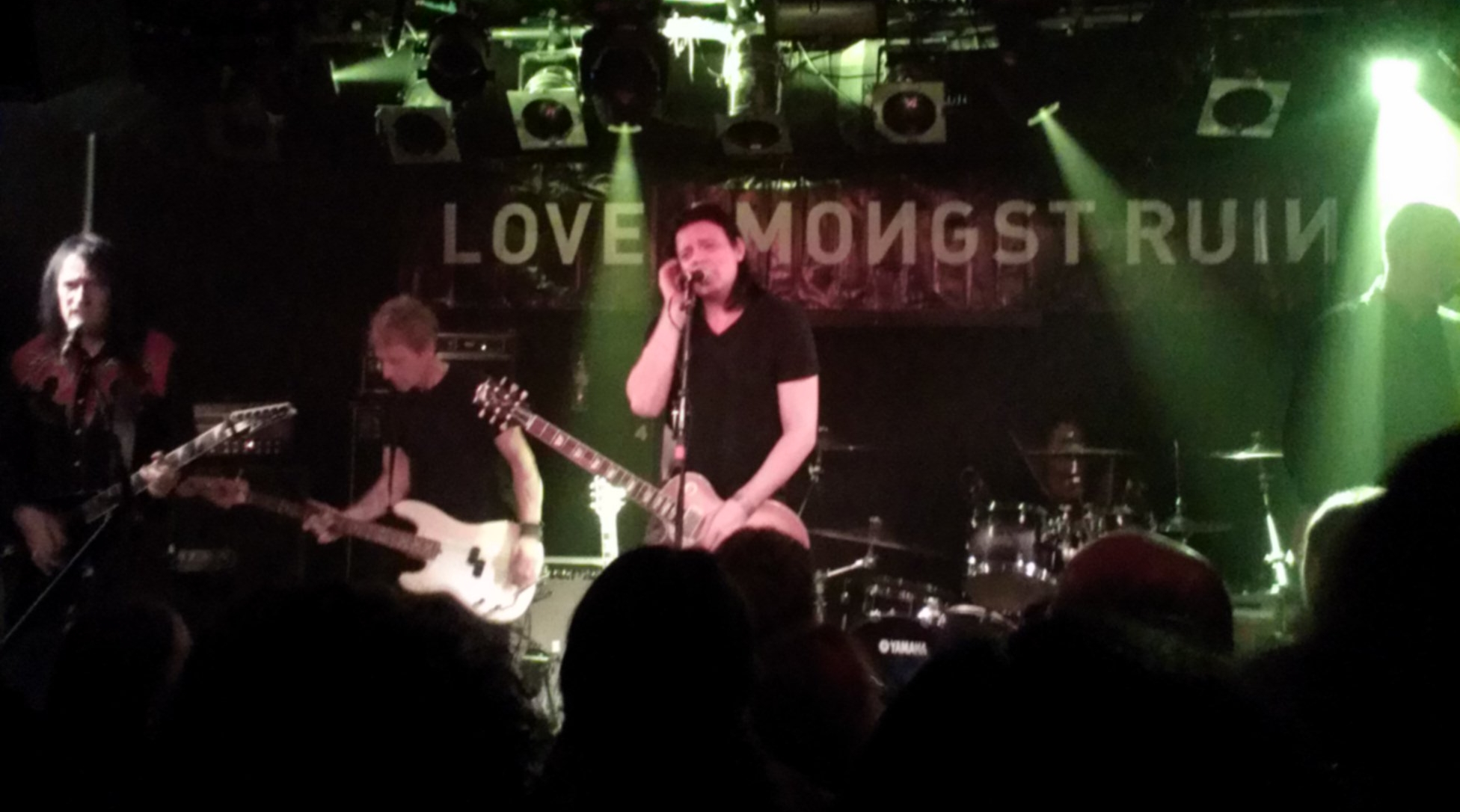
Love Amongst Ruin performing in London, November 2015.

On 3 September 2015, Love Amongst Ruin announced a European tour to support Lose Your Way. The tour included the band's debut shows in Austria, Slovenia, Croatia, Norway and Sweden. Gizz Butt (guitar) and Ravi Kesavaram (drums) were brought in to support the core lineup of Hewitt, Skinner and Bamonte. An instrumental version of the off-album track "Amy's Prayer" was used as the band's walk-on music.

Date	City	Country	Venue
Europe
24 November 2015	London	United Kingdom	Barfly
26 November 2015	Hamburg	Germany	Rock Café
27 November 2015	Krefeld	Germany	Kulturfabrik
29 November 2015	Frankfurt	Germany	Das Bett
1 December 2015	Vienna	Austria	Viper Room
2 December 2015	Ljubljana	Slovenia	Channel Zero
3 December 2015	Zagreb	Croatia	Vintage Industrial Bar
4 December 2015	Milan	Italy	Lo-Fi
6 December 2015	Dresden	Germany	Reithalle
7 December 2015	Berlin	Germany	Privatclub
9 December 2015	Oslo	Norway	John Dee Live Club
10 December 2015	Stockholm	Sweden	Pet Sounds
13 December 2015	Cologne	Germany	Underground
14 December 2015	Paris	France	Flèche d’Or

=== Cancelled dates ===
Date	City	Country	Venue	R
30 November 2015	Munich	Germany	Backstage	1
11 December 2015	Copenhagen	Denmark	Beta	1

1 Cancelled due to circumstances beyond the band's control.

== EPs ==
- 2015: "Lose Your Way" (11 May 2015)
- 2015: "Modern War Song" (23 July 2015)
- 2015: "So Close" (6 November 2015)
