= Acoustic (Love Amongst Ruin album) =

Studio album by Love Amongst Ruin
- Released: 5 December 2011
- Recorded: August 2011 at Fisher Lane Farm (Chiddingfold, Surrey)
- Genre: Acoustic, Alternative rock
- Length: 31:02
- Label: Ancient B Records
- Producer: Paul Corkett, Steve Hewitt, Harry Rutherford

Acoustic is an album by British rock band Love Amongst Ruin and features acoustic versions of eight tracks released on the band's debut album. It was released on 5 December 2011.

== Background ==
The band spent two days at Fisher Lane Farm in early August 2011 with producer Paul Corkett to record acoustic versions of nine tracks released on their self-titled debut album. Former member Laurie Ross returned to play cello at the sessions. The album's liner notes state "These versions and the speed with which they were recorded, represent a natural progression that comes from our familiarity with the tracks, having played them repeatedly throughout the course of our numerous live shows in 2010 and 2011".

== Release ==
The album was released on 5 December 2011 via Bandcamp as a CD and digital download. The album was preceded by the release of an acoustic version of "Bring Me Down (You Don't)", which was given away by the band as a free download on SoundCloud on 8 November 2011.

== Track listing ==
No.	Title	Writer(s)	Length
1.	"So Sad (Fade)"	Steve Hewitt	2:57
2.	"Alone"	Steve Hewitt, Jon Thorne	2:44
3.	"Running"	Steve Hewitt, Jon Thorne	4:09
4.	"Heaven & Hell"	Steve Hewitt	5:10
5.	"Away From Me"	Steve Hewitt, Jon Thorne	4:15
6.	"Blood & Earth"	Steve Hewitt, Jon Thorne	3:01
7.	"Truth"	Steve Hewitt, Jon Thorne	4:18
8.	"Home"	Steve Hewitt, Jon Thorne	4:30

== Personnel ==
- Steve Hewitt - vocals
- Donald Ross Skinner - guitar, backing vocals
- Steve Hove - guitar, backing vocals
- Teresa Morini - bass
- Ramon Sherrington - drums, percussion
- Laurie Ross - cello, keyboards, backing vocals
