= 04 (Six by Seven album) =

Studio album by Six by Seven
- Released: 27 September 2004
- Recorded: November 2002–summer 2004 at The Batcave, Peveril Hotel, Square Centre and Electric Mayhem in Nottingham, London
- Genres: Space rock, shoegaze, electronica
- Length: 55:51
- Label: Saturday Night Sunday Morning
- Producers: Rick Peet and Six by Seven

Six by Seven chronology
The Way I Feel Today (2004)	04 (2004)	Artists Cannibals Poets Thieves (2005)

Professional ratings
Review scores
Source	Rating
AllMusic	4/5 stars
NME	(7/10)
PopMatters	6/10 stars
Stylus Magazine	B−

04 is the fourth album by English indie rock band Six by Seven. It was released in 2004, and the first on their own Saturday Night Sunday Morning Records label after being released from Beggars Banquet Records. It was also their first after bass player Paul Douglas left the band and found them trying to capture their sound – which had been recorded live in the studio on The Way I Feel Today – as a three-piece.

== Track listing ==
All tracks are written by Six by Seven.

No.	Title	Length
1.	"Untitled"	4:48
2.	"Sometimes I Feel Like..."	4:56
3.	"Ready for You Now"	5:14
4.	"Ocean"	5:02
5.	"Say That You Want Me"	4:29
6.	"Lude I"	1:32
7.	"There's a Ghost"	4:32
8.	"Catch the Rain"	4:30
9.	"Bochum (Light Up My Life)"	4:50
10.	"Lude II"	3:27
11.	"Leave Me Alone"	10:19
12.	"Hours"	2:11

== Personnel ==
- Chris Olley – vocals, guitars, bass, harmonica
- Chris Davis – drums
- James Flower – Hammond organ, keyboards

Production

- Dave Fridmann – mixing
- Ric Peet – engineer
