= The Closer You Get (Six by Seven album) =

Studio album by Six by Seven
- Released: 16 March 2000
- Recorded: 1999 at Square Centre Studios and The Batcave in Nottingham
- Genre: Space rock, neo-psychedelia, shoegaze
- Length: 44:25
- Label: Beggars Banquet (UK); Mantra Recordings (US)
- Producer: Ric Peet, John Leckie, Six by Seven

Six by Seven chronology
The Things We Make (1998)	The Closer You Get (2000)	The Way I Feel Today (2002)

Professional ratings
Review scores
Source	Rating
AllMusic	4/5 stars
NME	(9/10)
Pitchfork (2000)	(7.2/10)
Pitchfork (2017)	(8/10)
Select	3/5 stars

The Closer You Get is the second album by English indie rock band Six by Seven, recorded at The Square Centre in Nottingham with Ric Peet (who produced one track on their first album), and John Leckie, (who has worked with many British bands including Radiohead and Simple Minds).

After the album's release, and just before playing at Glastonbury, guitarist Sam Hempton quit the band.

The album was critically acclaimed and appeared in several music magazine end-of-year polls, including those by NME and Melody Maker. It was reissued in 2017.

== Track listing ==
All tracks are written by Six by Seven.

No.	Title	Length
1.	"Eat Junk Become Junk"	3:05
2.	"Sawn Off Metallica T-Shirt"	2:14
3.	"Ten Places to Die"	5:30
4.	"New Year"	3:45
5.	"One Easy Ship Away"	3:04
6.	"My Life Is an Accident"	4:43
7.	"Don't Wanna Stop"	2:00
8.	"Slab Square"	2:34
9.	"England and a Broken Radio"	5:21
10.	"Another Love Song"	5:01
11.	"Overnight Success"	4:28
12.	"100 & Something Foxhall Road"	2:40

== Personnel ==
- Chris Olley – vocals, guitar
- Sam Hempton – guitar
- Paul Douglas – bass
- Chris Davis – drums
- James Flower – keyboards
