= Love Amongst Ruin =

English rock supergroup

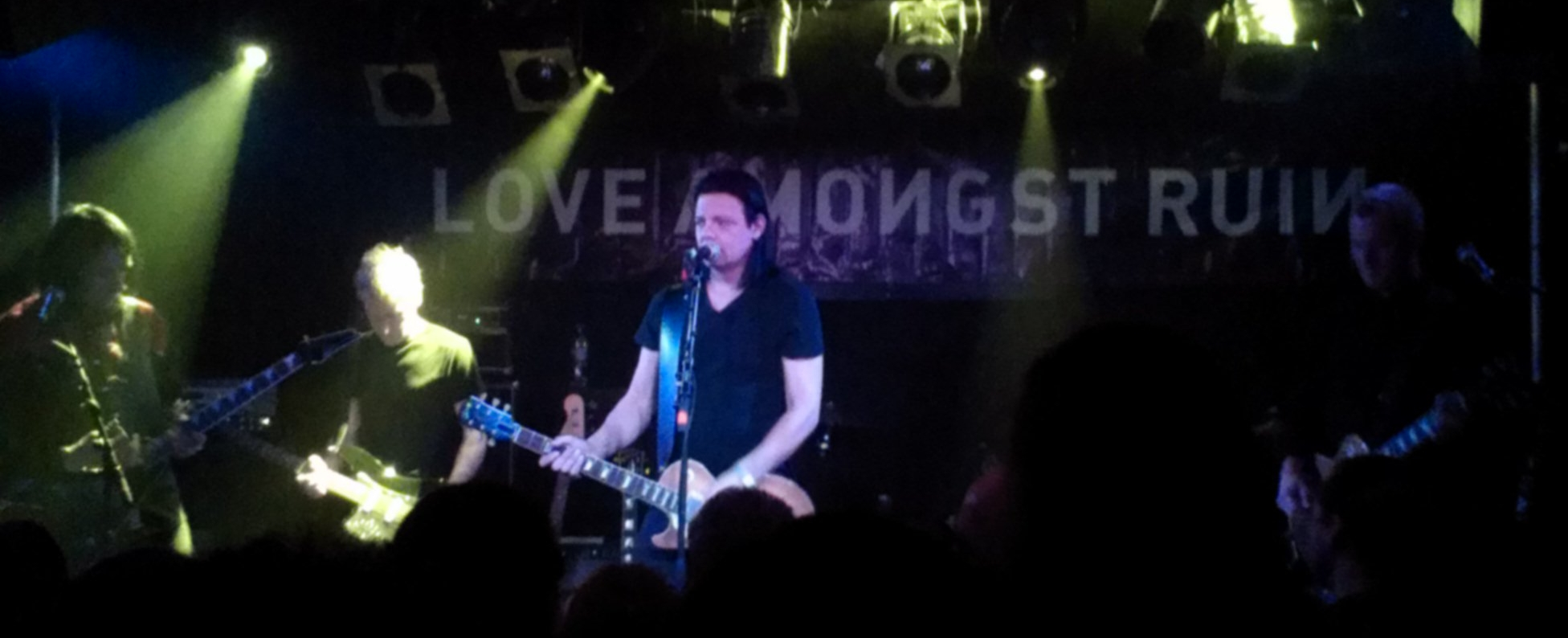
- Love Amongst Ruin live in London, 2015.

Background information
- Origin: London, England
- Genres: Alternative rock, hard rock
- Years active: 2009–present
- Labels: Ancient B Records
- Members: Steve Hewitt; Donald Ross Skinner
- Past members: Magnus Lundén; Keith York; Laurie Ross; Teresa Morini; Steve Hove; Ramon Sherrington; Dave Weston; Perry Bamonte

Love Amongst Ruin are an English rock supergroup, led by Steve Hewitt after his tenure as the drummer for Placebo. The band released their self-titled debut album in September 2010 and their second album Lose Your Way was released in June 2015.

== Band history ==
=== Beginnings and formation (2007–2009) ===
Upon leaving Placebo after the conclusion of their Meds tour in September 2007, Steve Hewitt had a vision "to create a new band, a new album and a new sound". He immediately enlisted Lamb bassist Jon Thorne and his brother Nick Hewitt to begin writing and demoing new music at his home studio. In March 2008, Julian Cope collaborator Donald Ross Skinner was brought in to oversee and co-produce the recording sessions. Between April and August 2008, the collective moved to Moles Studio in Bath for three recording sessions with producer Paul Corkett, which yielded ten songs, with Hewitt predominantly performing drums and lead vocals. Mixing began in September and continued for six months before the album was mastered by Brian Gardner at Bernie Grundman Mastering in April 2009.

Hewitt spent the second half of 2009 securing management, publishing and record deals, in addition to finding permanent members for the band. Former Cure and Depeche Mode tour manager Daryl Bamonte became the band's manager. In November, Hewitt revealed that the band and debut album would be named 'Love Amongst Ruin', with the band name being "a very apt description of the place I found myself in after I was ejected from Placebo. My life, the way it had been, seemed to be in ruins but I got a lot of love from fans and friends and family".

=== Love Amongst Ruin (2009–2011) ===
The band lineup was revealed in December 2009 and announced alongside Steve Hewitt (vocals/guitar) were Donald Ross Skinner (guitar), Steve Hove (guitar), Laurie Ross (keyboards & cello) and Keith York (drums). The band made their live debut at the Eurosonic Festival in Groningen, Netherlands on 14 January 2010, with guest bassist Jonathan Noyce. Bassist Magnus Lundén was added as a permanent member in time for the band's UK live debut at the Barfly in London on 11 May. The band followed up with a larger gig at the Scala in June. Magnus Lundén was replaced by Teresa Morini in July. The band appeared on the Red Bull Stage at Sonisphere Festival on 11 August, the day after Hewitt's previous band, Placebo, had played on the main stage.

Love Amongst Ruin's debut single "So Sad (Fade)" was released on 30 August on Ancient B Records, followed by their self-titled debut album on 13 September. The band embarked on the Heaven & Hell Tour from September through November and released their second single "Home" on 25 October. 2010 was wrapped up with a gig at Birmingham Academy supporting Feeder. Keith York left the band at the end of the year, expressing a desire to spend more time with his family. He was replaced by Ramon Sherrington. Laurie Ross was also removed from the live lineup, but continued to record with the band in the studio.

The band began 2011 with a quartet of gigs supporting Feeder, before supporting their third single, "Alone", with a short tour of France in March. Gizz Butt filled in for Steve Hove on the Recycling Party tour in May, while Jon Thorne stepped in for Teresa Morini at the Fête de la Musique in Valence, France in June. The band spent two days at Fisher Lane Farm in early August with producer Paul Corkett to record acoustic versions of nine tracks released on their self-titled debut album. Laurie Ross returned to play cello at the sessions. An acoustic version of "Bring Me Down (You Don't)" was given away by the band as a free download in advance of the release of the acoustic album on 5 December.

=== Lose Your Way (2011–2016) ===
In January 2011, Hewitt revealed he had begun writing the band's second album and that the band would commence recording after completing the supporting tour for their self-titled debut album. In June, Hewitt stated that "We're about nine tracks in. We're hoping to start recording in September. I've demoed most of the drums but we'll see when September comes who's going to play what. I've got to get my oar in and have a go, it'd be silly not to". The writing process for the album was completed in March 2012 and was recorded by Hewitt and Donald Ross Skinner, with Dan Austin producing. In May 2012 it was announced that Teresa Morini had left the band to join the Cirque du Soleil touring show Amaluna. Her replacement was former-Cure guitarist Perry Bamonte. On 5 July, the band made available a free download of their cover of "Rise" by Public Image Ltd via their Facebook page. In early September, founding guitarist Steve Hove left the band, causing a 10 September comeback show at the London Barfly to be cancelled. Dave Weston was announced as Hove's replacement in mid-November and the band commenced rehearsals. Despite announcements in January 2013 and February 2014 that news would be forthcoming, the band remained inactive while Hewitt worked with Six by Seven, Polaroid Kiss and produced records for Lys and Spiral 69.

On 13 March 2015, the band posted a short video clip on Vimeo, featuring new song "Lose Your Way". On 9 April, Q Magazine made "Swan Killer" their Track of the Day and the band announced the album title as Lose Your Way, with a release date of 29 June 2015. The album was preceded by the "Lose Your Way" EP on 11 May, with the title track peaking at number one on the Deutsche Alternative Singles Chart. The album was followed by the "Modern War Song" and "So Close" EPs on 24 July and 6 November. The album's supporting tour began on 24 November at the London Barfly and featured Gizz Butt (guitar) and Ravi Kesavaram (drums) as touring musicians alongside permanent members Hewitt, Skinner and Bamonte. By April 2021, the album had gone silver.

On 24 March 2016, the band revealed they were recording new material. Five months later, it was announced that Lose Your Way (Acoustic) (an album of acoustic versions of songs initially released on Lose Your Way) would be released on 2 September 2016. On 19 August 2016, a new song, "Amy's Prayer", featuring guest vocals from Amber Kingi, was made available for free via the band's web store. An EP, "Way To Your Heart", was released on 9 December 2016.

=== Return (2022–) ===
On 5 November 2021, it was announced that Love Amongst Ruin would support Paul Draper on his UK tour in February and March 2022. Reduced in length due to a family bereavement suffered by Paui Draper, the tour was performed acoustically by Steve Hewitt and Gizz Butt. Further acoustic gigs took place in Dover and Machynlleth in April 2022.

== Musical style and influences ==
Love Amongst Ruin describe themselves as "a multi-faceted rock band that promises the crunch of a stone age queen, the crossover appeal of a parkful of linkins and the melodicism of the hardiest fighter of foos". They also cite having New Order, Depeche Mode, Kasabian, Can, The Cure and Metallica elements to their sound.

== Band members ==
Current members

- Steve Hewitt – vocals, guitar, keyboards, programming (2009–present), bass (live 2009–2010, 2025–present; studio 2009–present), drums, percussion (live: 2014–present, studio: 2009–present)
- Donald Ross Skinner – guitar, keyboards, programming (2009–present), bass (live 2009–2010, 2025–present; studio 2009–present)

Touring musicians

- Jonathan Noyce – bass (2010)
- Gizz Butt – guitar (2011, 2015–present)
- Jon Thorne – bass (2011)
- Dave Weston – guitar (2012)
- Ravi Kesavaram – drums, percussion (2015–present)

Former members

- Steve Hove – guitar (2009–2012; session member 2012–2015)
- Keith York – drums, percussion (2009–2011)
- Laurie Ross – keyboards, programming, cello (2009–2011; session member 2011–2015)
- Magnus Lundén – bass (2010)
- Teresa Morini – bass (2010–2012)
- Perry Bamonte – bass (2012–2025; his death)
- Ramon Sherrington – drums, percussion (2011–2014; touring member 2014–2015)

Session musicians

- Nick Hewitt – guitar (2009–2010)
- Beth Porter – cello (2012–2015)

Timeline

== Discography ==
=== Studio albums ===
- Love Amongst Ruin (13 September 2010)
- Lose Your Way (29 June 2015)

=== Singles ===
- 2010: "So Sad (Fade)" (30 August 2010)
- 2010: "Home" (25 October 2010)
- 2011: "Alone" (28 February 2011)

=== EPs ===
- 2010: Home (Remixes) (25 October 2010)
- 2015: Lose Your Way (11 May 2015)
- 2015: Modern War Song (24 July 2015)
- 2015: So Close (6 November 2015)
- 2016: Way to Your Heart (9 December 2016)

=== Other albums ===
- 2011: Acoustic (5 December 2011)
- 2016: Lose Your Way (Acoustic) (2 September 2016)

=== Free downloads ===
- 2011: "Bring Me Down (You Don't)" (acoustic version, 8 November 2011)
- 2012: "Rise" (Public Image Ltd cover, 5 July 2012)
- 2016: "Amy's Prayer" (19 August 2016)

=== Music videos ===
Year	Video	Director	Link
2010	"So Sad (Fade)"	(unlisted)	YouTube
2010	"Home"	(unlisted)	YouTube
2011	"Alone"	(unlisted)	YouTube
2015	"Lose Your Way"	Eni Brandner	YouTube
2015	"Modern War Song"	Eni Brandner	YouTube
2015	"So Close"	Eni Brandner	YouTube
