= Love Amongst Ruin (album) =

Studio album by Love Amongst Ruin
- Released: 13 September 2010
- Recorded: April – August 2008 at Moles Studios (Bath, Somerset), Modern World Studios (Tetbury, Cotswolds), Old Laundry (Winchester, Hampshire)
- Genre: Alternative rock, hard rock
- Length: 41:19
- Label: Ancient B Records
- Producer: Donald Ross Skinner, Paul Corkett, Steve Hewitt

Love Amongst Ruin chronology
Love Amongst Ruin (2010)	Lose Your Way (2015)

Singles from Love Amongst Ruin
- 1. "So Sad (Fade)" Released: 30 August 2010; 2. "Home" Released: 25 October 2010; 3. "Alone" Released: 28 February 2011

Love Amongst Ruin is the self-titled debut studio album by the British rock band Love Amongst Ruin. It was released on 13 September 2010.

== Background ==
=== Writing and recording ===
After departing Placebo in October 2007, Steve Hewitt enlisted Lamb bassist Jon Thorne and his brother Nick Hewitt to begin writing and demoing new music at his home studio. Hewitt explained that he decided to write with Jon Thorne because he "wanted to play rock drums against somebody playing upright bass. And that's what we did and the first thing we ever wrote was "Running"". Julian Cope collaborator Donald Ross Skinner was brought in to oversee and co-produce the recording sessions and the collective relocated to Moles Studio in Bath for three recording sessions with producer Paul Corkett over the summer of 2008. The sessions yielded 10 songs, on which Steve performed drums and lead vocals. Mixing began in September and continued for six months before the album was mastered by Brian Gardner in April 2009.

"Bring Me Down (You Don't)" was to be included on the album, but legal trouble with publishers of the band Can resulted in the track being replaced with "Come On Say It". An acoustic version of the song was later released for free via SoundCloud in November 2011. "Come On Say It" featured then-band members Steve Hove, Laurie Ross and Keith York and was mixed ten weeks before the album's release. Other songs which were recorded, but didn't make the cut for the album, were cover versions of "Rise" (Public Image Ltd) and "Got To Give It Up" (Thin Lizzy), with both being released for free via SoundCloud in July 2012 and September 2020 respectively.

=== Themes ===
Hewitt stated that the album was inspired by "greed, failed relationships, spitefulness and hatred. 90% of the album is inspired by those things. The other 10% belongs to true love".

== Reception ==
Professional ratings
Review scores
Source	Rating
Rock Sound	8/10 stars

Rock Sound gave the album 8/10, saying the album "reveals itself to be an intelligent, complex and confident effort that's delivered with an energy and determination that seeks to redefine Hewitt as a credible artist in his own right". Soundsphere gave the album 4/5, stating "this is a fine album, with double points for being a debut". Student Beans gave the album 3/5, saying "Love Amongst Ruin captures a range of sounds, packaged as a polished rock album".

== Acoustic ==
An acoustic version of the album was released on 5 December 2011, titled "Acoustic". "Come On Say It" and "Love Song" were omitted from the track list.

== Tour ==
Prior to the tour, Love Amongst Ruin made their live debut at Eurosonic Festival in January 2010 (with bassist Jonathan Noyce) and played two one-off club dates in London the following May and June. Bassist Magnus Lundén joined the band prior to the club dates, but was replaced by Teresa Morini in July. The band followed with an appearance at the Sonisphere Festival at Knebworth Park in August.

The Heaven & Hell tour began one week after the release of the album in September 2010. The first leg began with a three-week jaunt through continental Europe, beginning in Zaandam, Netherlands and finishing in Paris, France in mid-October. Following a two-week break, the tour resumed with seven dates in the United Kingdom and Ireland. Gigs in Southampton (later rescheduled) and Glasgow were cancelled due to drummer Keith York suffering with illness. Following the conclusion of the European tour, the band were invited to support Feeder and The Futureheads in Birmingham at Kerrang! magazine's "X-Mas Party". Keith York quit the band at the end of the year and was replaced by Ramon Sherrington.

In February 2011, the band reemerged with more slots supporting Feeder in the United Kingdom on their Renegades tour. Prior to the gigs, the band slimmed down to a five-piece after removing keyboardist/cellist Laurie Ross from the lineup. The band supported the release of the "Alone" single with five shows in France in March, but only managed to play one date of their German tour in April after shows in Hamburg, Frankfurt and Dortmund were cancelled. The band returned to France in May for two dates on the Recycling Party tour, with guitarist Gizz Butt filling in for Steve Hove. The band finished the tour in June 2011 with two headlining dates at the Borderline in London and at the Fête de la Musique in Valence, France. Jon Thorne filled in for Teresa Morini at the latter date.

The band's setlists for the tour were mainly drawn from their debut album, with "Love Song" being the only track from the album which was not played live. A cover of Thin Lizzy's "Got To Give It Up" was a regular inclusion. Owing to the band's shortage of material, encores often included a repeat play of debut single "So Sad (Fade)", in addition to non-album track "Bring Me Down (You Don't)". New song "Pop DC" was premiered in London in June 2011, along with a cover of "Rise" by Public Image Ltd.

Date	City	Country	Venue
Debut Performances & Festivals
14 January 2010	Groningen	Netherlands	Huize Maas (Note: As part of Eurosonic Festival.)
11 May 2010	London	United Kingdom	Barfly
9 June 2010	London	United Kingdom	Scala
1 August 2010	Knebworth	United Kingdom	Knebworth House (Note: As part of Sonisphere Festival.)
Heaven & Hell Tour
23 September 2010	Zaandam	Netherlands	De Kade
24 September 2010	Brussels	Belgium	Botanique Witloof Bar
25 September 2010	Hamburg	Germany	Gruenspan (Note: As part of Reeperbahn Festival.)
26 September 2010	Berlin	Germany	Magnet
28 September 2010	Poznań	Poland	Eskulap
29 September 2010	Warsaw	Poland	Powiększenie
1 October 2010	Munich	Germany	59:1
4 October 2010	Turin	Italy	Spazio 211
5 October 2010	Milan	Italy	Magazzini Generali
6 October 2010	Rome	Italy	Circolo degli Artisti
7 October 2010	Bologna	Italy	Covo
9 October 2010	Yverdon-les-Bains	Switzerland	Amalgame
10 October 2010	Zurich	Switzerland	Abart
13 October 2010	Cologne	Germany	Luxor
14 October 2010	Paris	France	Flèche d’Or
30 October 2010	London	United Kingdom	Garage
31 October 2010	Wolverhampton	United Kingdom	Slade Rooms
3 November 2010	Manchester	United Kingdom	Club Academy
4 November 2010	Leeds	United Kingdom	Cockpit 3
5 November 2010	Nottingham	United Kingdom	Rock City Basement
7 November 2010	Belfast	United Kingdom	Stiff Kitten
8 November 2010	Dublin	Ireland	Academy 2
Supporting Feeder
9 December 2010	Birmingham	United Kingdom	Academy
13 February 2011	Manchester	United Kingdom	Academy
16 February 2011	Cambridge	United Kingdom	Junction
17 February 2011	Royal Leamington Spa	United Kingdom	Assembly
19 February 2011	Portsmouth	United Kingdom	Pyramids
Alone Tour
1 March 2011	Southampton	United Kingdom	Talking Heads (Note: Rescheduled from 29 October 2010.)
2 March 2011	Nancy	France	Fnac
2 March 2011	Nancy	France	Mac Carthy
3 March 2011	Besançon	France	La Rodia
4 March 2011	Paris	France	International
5 March 2011	Lille	France	La Péniche
11 April 2011	Berlin	Germany	Crystal Club
Recycling Party Tour
18 May 2011	Rennes	France	Fnac
20 May 2011	Nantes	France	Le Ferrailleur
21 May 2011	Rennes	France	L'etage
Europe & Festivals
7 June 2011	London	United Kingdom	Borderline
21 June 2011	Valence	France	Kiosque Peynet (Note: As part of Fête de la Musique.)

=== Cancelled dates ===
Date	City	Country	Venue	R
2 October 2010	Vienna	Austria	Szene	1
12 October 2010	Stuttgart	Germany	Universum	1
29 October 2010	Southampton	United Kingdom	Joiners	2
2 November 2010	Glasgow	United Kingdom	Cathouse	2
10 April 2011	Hamburg	Germany	Logo	1
12 April 2011	Frankfurt	Germany	Nachtleben	1
13 April 2011	Dortmund	Germany	Freizeitzentrum West	1
11 June 2011	Paris	France	Summerjam	1

- 1 Cancelled due to circumstances beyond the band's control.
- 2 Cancelled as a precaution due to illness.

== Track listing ==
No.	Title	Writer(s)	Length
1.	"So Sad (Fade)"	Steve Hewitt	3:07
2.	"Alone"	Steve Hewitt & Jon Thorne	3.04
3.	"Running"	Steve Hewitt & Jon Thorne	4:30
4.	"Heaven & Hell"	Steve Hewitt	4:16
5.	"Come On Say It"	Steve Hewitt	6:51
6.	"Away From Me"	Steve Hewitt & Jon Thorne	4:13
7.	"Blood & Earth"	Steve Hewitt & Jon Thorne	3:25
8.	"Truth"	Steve Hewitt & Jon Thorne	4:02
9.	"Home"	Steve Hewitt & Jon Thorne	3:56
10.	"Love Song"	Steve Hewitt	3:59

iTunes bonus track
No.	Title	Length
11.	"Alone" (acoustic)	3:02

== Personnel ==
- Steve Hewitt – vocals, drums, bass, guitar, piano
- Jon Thorne – bass, guitar, string arrangements
- Donald Ross Skinner – guitar, bass, piano
- Nick Hewitt – guitar
- Steve Hove – guitar on "Come On Say It"
- Paul Turner – bass on "Come On Say It"
- Laurie Ross – keyboards, cello on "Come On Say It"
- Keith York – drums on "Come On Say It"
- Tracy Bowen – backing vocals on "Truth"
- Emily Reid – backing vocals on "Love Song"
- Claire Nicolson – backing vocals on "Truth"
- Jo Thorne – backing vocals on "Alone"

== Production ==
- Tracks 1, 2, 3, 4, 6, 7, 8, 9, 10 – recorded and mixed by Donald Ross Skinner, Paul Corkett, Steve Hewitt.
- Track 5 – recorded and mixed by Donald Ross Skinner, Paul Corkett, Steve Hewitt, Nick Poortman.

== Singles ==
- 2010: "So Sad (Fade)" (30 August 2010)
- 2010: "Home" (25 October 2010)
- 2011: "Alone" (28 February 2011)
