= The Way I Feel Today (Six by Seven album) =

Studio album by Six by Seven
- Released: 6 March 2002
- Recorded: 2001
- Studio: Rockfield (Rockfield, Wales)
- Genre: Space rock, noise rock, shoegaze
- Length: 40:28
- Label: Beggars Banquet (UK); Mantra Recordings (US)
- Producer: Ric Peet

Six by Seven chronology
The Closer You Get (2000)	The Way I Feel Today (2002)	04 (2004)

Professional ratings
Review scores
Source	Rating
AllMusic	3/5 stars
Drowned in Sound	(10/10)
NME	(7/10)
Pitchfork	(7.7/10)
Stylus Magazine	(B+)

The Way I Feel Today is the third album by English indie rock band Six by Seven. It was released in 2002 on Beggars Banquet Records in the UK and Mantra Recordings in the US. The band's first album as a four-piece following the departure of guitarist Sam Hempton, it showcased what was in part more song-based, commercial approach following the building, atmospheric drone rock of previous albums The Things We Make and The Closer You Get. It includes the single "I.O.U. Love", possibly the band's most pop-orientated to date.

== Track listing ==
All tracks are written by Six by Seven.

No.	Title	Length
1.	"So Close"	4:39
2.	"I.O.U. Love"	4:13
3.	"All My New Best Friends"	4:17
4.	"Flypaper for Freaks"	2:17
5.	"Speed Is In, Speed Is Out"	2:34
6.	"Karen O"	3:52
7.	"American Beer"	5:41
8.	"Anyway"	2:36
9.	"The Way I Feel Today"	3:44
10.	"Cafeteria Rats"	3:58
11.	"Bad Man"	2:37
12.	"Fraggle Rock" (Japan bonus track)	1:51
13.	"Requiem for an Oil-Spill Seagull" (Japan bonus track)	5:54
14.	"Chanson Mort-Homme" (Japan bonus track)	3:29

== Personnel ==
- Chris Olley – vocals, guitar
- Paul Douglas – bass
- Chris Davis – drums
- James Flower – keyboards

Additional personnel

- Ray Dickaty – flute on "I.O.U. Love", saxophones on "Requiem for an Oil-Spill Seagull"
- Sharon MckKinley – cello on "All My New Best Friends"
- Oliver Wilson-Dickson – violin on "All My New Best Friends"
- John Hoare – trumpets and horns on "All My New Best Friends"
