= So Sad (Fade) =

Single by Love Amongst Ruin

from the album Love Amongst Ruin
- B-side: "Love Song"
- Released: 30 August 2010
- Recorded: Moles Studios
- Genre: Alternative rock, hard rock
- Length: 3:07
- Label: Ancient B Records
- Songwriter: Steve Hewitt
- Producers: Donald Ross Skinner, Steve Hewitt, Paul Corkett

Love Amongst Ruin singles chronology
| "So Sad (Fade)" (2010) | "Home" (2010) |

"So Sad (Fade)" is the debut single by British rock band Love Amongst Ruin. The single was released on 30 August 2010 on Ancient B Records.

== Reception ==
The single received generally positive reviews. AAA Music described the song as "an angry tune boosting a QOTSA sound alike intro, made of sharp guitars", while ATTN:Magazine said "all in all this is a promising start, and vocalist Steve Hewitt has done well to avoid sounding too much like Placebo." God Is in the TV gave the single 3/5.

== Track listings ==
CD single

1. "So Sad (Fade)"
2. "Love Song"
3. "So Sad (Fade) (Murdered by Killers #2)"

7"

1. "So Sad (Fade)"
2. "So Sad (Fade) (Murdered by Killers #2)"

7" (Limited Edition)

1. "So Sad (Fade)"
2. "Love Song"

Amazon exclusive

1. "So Sad (Fade) (Acoustic)"

== Credits ==
- Steve Hewitt – vocals, drums, bass, guitar, piano
- Jon Thorne – bass, guitar, Logic, string arrangements
- Nick Hewitt – guitar
- Donald Ross Skinner – guitar, bass, piano
