= Bring Me Down (You Don't) =

Song by Love Amongst Ruin
- Released: 8 November 2011
- Recorded: 2008, 2011 (acoustic version)
- Genre: Alternative rock
- Length: 5:00
- Label: Ancient B Records
- Songwriter: Steve Hewitt
- Producers: Donald Ross Skinner, Steve Hewitt, Paul Corkett

"Bring Me Down (You Don't)" is a song by British rock band Love Amongst Ruin, written by singer and guitarist Steve Hewitt. The song has frequently been performed live by the band.

== Background ==
The music for "Bring Me Down (You Don't)" is taken from the song "Bel Air" by krautrock band Can. The song was recorded along with the rest of the band's debut album in 2007 and 2008. Steve Hewitt said of the writing process, "I used the music from a band called Can and I put my own lyrics to it and rearranged it". He later had to submit the song to Can's publishers and did not hear back from them. As a result, the song was replaced on the album with "Come On Say It".

== Release ==
An acoustic version of the song was given away by the band as a free download on SoundCloud on 8 November 2011, in advance of the release of "Acoustic".
