= Lose Your Way =

Lose Your Way may refer to:

- Lose Your Way (album), a 2015 album by Love Amongst Ruin
- Lose Your Way (song), a 1999 song by Sophie B. Hawkins
