= The Way I Feel Today =

The Way I Feel Today may refer to:

- The Way I Feel Today (Six by Seven album)
- The Way I Feel Today (Stan Ridgway album)
