= Spotlight Kid =

Spotlight Kid may refer to:

- Spotlight Kid (band), an English shoegaze band
- The Spotlight Kid, a 1972 album by Captain Beefheart
- "Spotlight Kid", a song by Rainbow on their 1981 album Difficult to Cure
