= The Things We Make =

Studio album by Six by Seven
- Released: 25 May 1998
- Recorded: 1997 at Moles Studios in Bath; The Wood Hall in Beckington; Chiswick Reach in London
- Genre: Rock
- Length: 51:28
- Label: Beggars Banquet (UK); Mantra Recordings (US)
- Producer: Ric Peet, Trevor Curwen, Paul Corkett and Six by Seven

Six by Seven chronology
The Things We Make (1998)	The Closer You Get (2000)

Professional ratings
Review scores
Source	Rating
AllMusic	4/5 stars
Pitchfork	6.7/10
Rolling Stone	3/5 stars

The Things We Make is the debut album by English indie rock band Six by Seven, released on 25 May 1998 in the United Kingdom and 6 October 1998 in the United States. The album included the single "European Me", described by the NME as "one of the greatest debut singles of all time". The album featured numerous 'epic' tracks with "Oh! Dear", "European Me" and "88-92-96" all clocking in at almost seven minutes or more and "Spy Song" reaching almost nine minutes. Aside from "European Me", "88-92-96", "Candlelight" and "For You" were released as singles, with "Candlelight" reaching the lower regions of the singles charts. The album was ranked 13th in NME's end-of-year poll for 1998.

== Track listing ==
All tracks are written by Six by Seven, except "Young Man's Stride" was written by Jonathan Donahue and Sean Mackowiak.

No.	Title	Length
1.	"A Beautiful Shape"	4:37
2.	"European Me"	7:10
3.	"Candlelight"	4:05
4.	"For You"	3:30
5.	"Spy Song"	8:46
6.	"Something Wild"	4:10
7.	"Brilliantly Cute"	3:57
8.	"Oh! Dear"	7:31
9.	"88-92-96"	6:35
10.	"Comedown"	1:19
11.	"This" (Japan bonus track)	4:03
12.	"Your Town" (Japan bonus track)	3:27
13.	"Young Man's Stride" (Japan bonus track, Mercury Rev cover)	2:56

The Things We Make [Album Sampler]

1. "Candlelight"
2. "For You"
3. "Something Wild"
4. "88-92-96"

== Personnel ==
- Chris Olley – vocals, guitar
- Sam Hempton – guitar
- Paul Douglas – bass
- Chris Davis – drums
- James Flower – Hammond organ, tenor saxophone
