= Paul Corkett =

British record producer, audio engineer and arranger

- Origin: Britain
- Genres: Rock, alternative rock
- Occupations: Record producer, engineer, arranger

Paul Corkett is a British record producer, engineer and arranger.

== Biography ==
Corkett got his start as an engineer in the mid-1980s, engineering singles and albums for bands as varied as ABC, the Chameleons, Twelfth Night and the Heart Throbs. He landed his first big engineering gig in 1992, recording the single "China" for Tori Amos's debut album Little Earthquakes. In 1994, he produced his first full album, the second album Fake by Adorable. His engineering work on the Cure's 10th album Wild Mood Swings led to him producing the band's next album, Bloodflowers, released in 2000. After engineering Placebo's second album Without You I'm Nothing, in 1999 Corkett was invited to produce the band's third album Black Market Music. The early 2000s saw him producing albums for small alternative British bands the Cooper Temple Clause, Biffy Clyro and Queenadreena. In 2012, he teamed up with Love Amongst Ruin frontman Steve Hewitt to engineer albums for French band Lys and Italian band Spiral 69. Corkett often works at Moles Studio in Bath, having recorded albums by Billy No Mates, Queenadreena, Dionysos, Fiction Plane and Love Amongst Ruin there.

== Production ==
- 1990 The Heart Throbs – "I See Danger"
- 1991 Vera Kaa – Different Ways
- 1994 Adorable – Fake
- 1995 Sleeper – Smart
- 1996 Strangelove – Love and Other Demons
- 1997 Strangelove – Strangelove
- 1997 Warm Jets – Future Signs
- 1998 The Dandys – Symphonic Screams
- 2000 Placebo – Black Market Music
- 2000 The Cure – Bloodflowers
- 2002 The Cooper Temple Clause – See This Through and Leave
- 2002 Snuff – Disposable Income
- 2002 Biffy Clyro – Blackened Sky
- 2005 Queenadreena – The Butcher and the Butterfly
- 2005 Fat Cats – Deadbeat
- 2007 Fiction Plane – Left Side of the Brain
- 2007 Ciam – Anonymous
- 2008 Computerclub – Before the Walls Came Down
- 2010 Love Amongst Ruin – Love Amongst Ruin
- 2011 Love Amongst Ruin – Acoustic
- 2012 The Heavy – The Glorious Dead
- 2024 The Cure – Songs of a Lost World

== Engineer ==
- 1985 ABC – How to Be a ... Zillionaire!
- 1985 Uriah Heep – Equator
- 1986 The Chameleons – Strange Times
- 1986 Twelfth Night – Twelfth Night XII
- 1989 Xmal Deutschland – Devils
- 1990 Les Maracas – Les Maracas
- 1992 Tori Amos – Little Earthquakes
- 1992 DNA – Taste This
- 1992 Howard Jones – In the Running
- 1992 Julian Cope – Jehovahkill
- 1992 No. 9 Dream – Let It Come Down!
- 1993 Deacon Blue – Whatever You Say, Say Nothing
- 1993 The Fat Lady Sings – Johnson
- 1993 Tribe – Sleeper
- 1993 Björk – Debut
- 1994 Juliet Roberts – Natural Thing
- 1995 Catherine Wheel – Happy Days
- 1996 The Cure – Wild Mood Swings
- 1996 Dirty Three – Horse Stories
- 1996 Inaura – One Million Smiles
- 1997 Nick Cave and the Bad Seeds – The Boatman's Call
- 1998 Man With No Name – Earth Moving the Sun
- 1998 Six by Seven – The Things We Make
- 1998 Placebo – Without You I'm Nothing
- 1999 Suede – Head Music
- 2000 16 Horsepower – Secret South
- 2000 Electrasy – In Here We Fall
- 2002 Kaolin – Allez
- 2003 Yat-Kha – Tuva.Rock
- 2005 Delays – Faded Seaside Glamour
- 2005 The Coral – The Invisible Invasion
- 2005 Dionysos – Monsters in Love
- 2005 Patrick Duff – Luxury Problems
- 2005 Billy No Mates – We Are Legion
- 2009 Jennie DeVoe – Fireworks and Karate Supplies
- 2006 Seize the Day – The Tide is Turning
- 2007 Young Love – Too Young to Fight It
- 2007 Grace – Detours
- 2009 Jennie DeVoe – Strange Sunshine
- 2010 Maika Makovski – Maika Makovski
- 2013 Lys – Go Your Own Way
- 2013 Spiral69 – Ghosts in My Eyes

== Remixes ==
- 1989 Xmal Deutschland – "Dreamland"
- 1993 Tribe – "Miracle of Sound"
- 1994 Adorable – "Road Movie"
- 1997 The Cure – "Mint Car"
- 2020 Serpent Ride – "Dance Now"
