= Home (Love Amongst Ruin song) =

Single by Love Amongst Ruin

from the album Love Amongst Ruin
- Released: 25 October 2010
- Recorded: Moles Studios
- Genre: Alternative rock, hard rock
- Length: 3:56
- Label: Ancient B Records
- Songwriter: Steve Hewitt
- Producers: Donald Ross Skinner, Steve Hewitt, Paul Corkett

Love Amongst Ruin singles chronology
"So Sad (Fade)" (2010)	"Home" (2010)	"Alone" (2011)

"Home" is the second single by British rock band Love Amongst Ruin. The single was released on 25 October 2010 on Ancient B Records.

== Reception ==
AAA Music said of the single, "like So Sad (Fade), it’s based on a constant guitar riff that supports Steve’s distorted, languid and angry vocals, but it has not such a big impact".

== Track listing ==
=== 7" single ===
1. "Home"
2. "Home (Ashley Casselle & Mark O'Brien Remix 7" Edit)"

== Remixes ==
A remix EP was released along with the single.

== Credits ==
- Steve Hewitt – vocals, drums, bass, guitar, piano
- Jon Thorne – bass, guitar, Logic, string arrangements
- Nick Hewitt – guitar
- Donald Ross Skinner – guitar, bass, piano
