= If Symptoms Persist, Kill Your Doctor =

Studio album by Six by Seven
- Released: July 2007
- Recorded: 2007
- Genre: Indie rock
- Length: 44:36
- Label: Saturday Night Sunday Morning
- Producer: Six by Seven

Six by Seven chronology
Club Sandwich at the Peveril Hotel (2005)	If Symptoms Persist, Kill Your Doctor (2007)	Love and Peace and Sympathy (2013)

Professional ratings
Review scores
Source	Rating
NME	(7/10)
Stylus Magazine	(B+)

If Symptoms Persist, Kill Your Doctor is the sixth studio album by Six by Seven. It is inspired by the BBC programme called The Trap. The album is limited to 1000 copies.

== Track listing ==
1. "Nations" - 6:20
2. "Radio Silence" - 5:40
3. "Liberation" - 6:29
4. "Push" - 4:54
5. "World Army" - 4:55
6. "Enemy" - 5:30
7. "Diplomatique" - 6:21
8. "War Nations" - 4:27
