= Cleopatra Grip =

Studio album by the Heart Throbs
- Released: 1990
- Genre: Indie pop
- Label: One Little Indian; Elektra
- Producer: Martin Hannett, Gil Norton

The Heart Throbs chronology
Cleopatra Grip (1990)	Jubilee Twist (1992)

Cleopatra Grip is the debut album by the English band the Heart Throbs, released in 1990. The Heart Throbs supported the album with a UK tour and by opening for the Railway Children on a North American tour.

The album made the top 10 on the Billboard Alternative Albums chart. "Dreamtime" peaked at No. 2 on the Billboard Modern Rock Tracks chart.

== Production ==
The album was produced by Martin Hannett, with Gil Norton assisting. Like all of the Heart Throbs' records, the album title employs slang for female genitalia. The lyrics of "White Laughter" were inspired by the film Gimme Shelter.

== Critical reception ==
Professional ratings
Review scores
Source	Rating
AllMusic	4.5/5 stars
Chicago Tribune	3/4 stars
The Encyclopedia of Popular Music	3/5 stars
The Rolling Stone Album Guide	3/5 stars
The San Diego Union-Tribune	2.5/4 stars
Select	3/5
The State	3/5 stars
Martin C. Strong	6/10

Trouser Press wrote that the singer/guitar player Rose Carlotti "lends a breathy coo to the psychedelically charged, slightly dancey guitar rock." The New York Times thought that Cleopatra Grip "puts the Heart Throbs alongside the year's best new bands, meshing memorable melodies and guitar lines with lyrics that mix clarity and enigma." The Washington Post opined that the album "skillfully straddles the line between spontaneous and slick... The results are eminently listenable, but a little overfamiliar."

The Chicago Tribune declared that "never has boredom sounded so sensual... While a mass of shimmering guitars washes over Carlotti`s flat, echo-laden voice, bass and drums bubble insistently underneath." Spin deemed the album "indie pop [with] a coat of AOR gloss." The Sun Sentinel likened the style of "airy vocals floating over a sparse, edgy rock sound" to Siouxsie and the Banshees. The Times Union stated: "This is music for the Twin Peaks generation: moody, self-indulgent, streaked with ethereal synthesizer sounds, seemingly residing in that shadowy state between dream and reality."

AllMusic wrote that "the slightly poppier singles 'Tossed Away' and 'Dreamtime' are the album's highlights but, while a couple of the songs coast by simply on atmosphere, Cleopatra Grip is a luxurious and compelling listen."

== Track listing ==
No.	Title	Length
1.	"Tossed Away"
2.	"Dreamtime"
3.	"Big Commotion (Remix)"
4.	"In Vain"
5.	"Slip & Slide"
6.	"Here I Hide"
7.	"Calavera"
8.	"I Wonder Why"
9.	"She's in a Trance"
10.	"Blood from a Stone (Remix)"
11.	"Kiss Me When I'm Starving"
12.	"White Laughter"
