= Guiding Spirit (Nat Birchall album) =

Studio album by Nat Birchall
- Released: 2010
- Genre: Jazz
- Length: 47:47
- Label: Gondwana

Nat Birchall chronology
Akhenaten (2009)	Guiding Spirit (2010)	Sacred Dimension (2011)

Guiding Spirit is an album by saxophonist Nat Birchall, released on Gondwana Records in 2010.

== Track listing ==
Guiding Spirit track listing
No.	Title	Length
1.	"Open Up the Gates"	9:30
2.	"Keep the Light Shining"	7:39
3.	"Higher Regions"	7:44
4.	"Going to the Mountain"	7:46
5.	"Becoming"	8:27
6.	"Guiding Spirit"	6:41
Total length:		47:47
