= The Parachute Men =

British indie pop/indie rock band

- Origin: Leeds, England
- Genres: Indie pop, indie rock
- Years active: 1985–1990
- Label: Fire
- Past members: Fiona Gregg; Stephen H. Gregg; Andrew Howes; Mark Boyce; Matthew Parkin; Paul Walker; Colleen Browne; Tony Hodges

The Parachute Men were a British indie pop/indie rock band from Leeds, England, formed in 1985. They released two albums and several singles before splitting up in the early 1990s.

== History ==
The Parachute Men formed in 1985, with a line-up of Fiona Gregg (vocals), Stephen H. Gregg (guitar), Andrew Howes (bass and keyboards), and Mark Boyce (drums and keyboards). After two years of gigging, the band were signed by large London indie label Fire Records in 1987. Their first release was a four-track EP with "Sometimes in Vain" as the lead track, in May 1988. This was followed in August of the same year by debut album The Innocents, which made the NME top 50 albums of that year. The album was followed with two singles, "If I Could Wear Your Jacket" (which author Mike Gayle has stated is one of his all-time favourite records) and "Bed and Breakfast". A further single, "Leeds Station" was released and also featured on the NME's Carry On Disarming video.

Howes and Boyce departed soon after, with Fiona and Stephen continuing as an acoustic duo until they recruited Matthew Parkin (bass) and Paul Walker (drums). 1990 saw the release of the second album, Earth, Dogs, and Eggshells, preceded by the single "Every Other Thursday" (a reference to signing on to the dole). The album was released over a year after it was recorded, losing much of the momentum the band had built up. The band line-up changed again, with Canadian Colleen Browne replacing Matthew Parkin. They eventually recruited a further bass player, Tony Hodges, but after playing just one gig, at Liverpool University, split in the early 1990s with no further releases.

Mark Boyce later turned up in the band The Durbervilles. Andrew Howes has recorded music for the netlabels Surrism-Phonoethics (Germany) and CJC/LEEP (France) and is a contributor to the quarterly surveys published by Classwar Karaoke (UK) under the name Kalistongue. Matthew Parkin went on to play with The Starlings, The Jesus and Mary Chain, The Mission, Miranda Sex Garden, and Silver Sun. Colleen Browne later joined Pale Saints, The Warm Jets, The Heart Throbs, and White Hotel. Stephen Gregg gained a PhD in English literature at the University of Leeds and is now a senior lecturer at Bath Spa University, specialising in eighteenth century literature.

== Discography ==
=== Albums ===
- The Innocents (1988) Fire
- Earth, Dogs, and Eggshells (1990) Fire

=== Singles ===
- "Sometimes in Vain" (1988) Fire (12" EP)
- "If I Could Wear Your Jacket" (1988) Fire
- "Leeds Station" (1989) Fire
- "Bed and Breakfast" (1989) Fire
- "Every Other Thursday" (1990) Fire
