= Club Sandwich at the Peveril Hotel =

Studio album by Six by Seven
- Released: January 2006
- Recorded: 2005
- Genre: Indie rock, space rock
- Length: 60.17
- Label: Saturday Night Sunday Morning
- Producer: Six by Seven

Six by Seven chronology
Artists Cannibals Poets Thieves (2005)	Club Sandwich at the Peveril Hotel (2006)	If Symptoms Persist, Kill Your Doctor (2007)

Professional ratings
Review scores
Source	Rating
Gigwise	3.5/5 stars

Club Sandwich at the Peveril Hotel was the final release by Six by Seven, made after the group disbanded. Following the split in late 2005, 3 original members of the band (Chris Olley, James Flower and Chris Davis) formed a new band (tentatively called 'Collision') with two additional members (Ady Fletcher and Tony 'Doggen' Foster), with the hope of developing a new sound. Understandably, the sessions ended up sounding like Six by Seven, and so the recordings were released under that moniker.

== Track listing ==
1. "Intro and Theme Tune" – 5:08
2. "Got to Find a Way Out of Here" – 5:18
3. "Do You Believe?" – 5:21
4. "America" – 4:05
5. "Sailing Around the Horn" – 4:26
6. "I'm Gonna Try" – 5:13
7. "In My Hell" – 6:28
8. "Don't Wanna Dance" – 4:27
9. "In a Hole" – 4:17
10. "25 Years" – 5:21
11. "How Does It Feel" – 5:12
12. "Don't Let It Bring You Down" – 5:06
