= Demmamussabebonk =

Studio album by Snuff
- Released: 13 February 1996
- Recorded: November 1995
- Genre: Punk rock
- Length: 34:03
- Label: Fat Wreck Chords
- Producer: Snuff

Snuff chronology
Reach (1992)	Demmamussabebonk (1996)	Potatoes and Melons... (1997)

Professional ratings
Review scores
Source	Rating
Allmusic	4/5 stars

Demmamussabebonk is the third full-length studio album by English punk rock band Snuff. It was released in February, 1996 on American independent label Fat Wreck Chords, and on Deceptive Records in the UK.

== Track listing ==
- All songs written by Snuff, unless otherwise stated
1. "Vikings" – 3:08
2. "Defeat" – 1:58
3. "Dicky Trois" – 2:11
4. "Martin" – 2:10
5. "Nick Northern" – 3:16
6. "Batten Down the Hatches" (Crighton, Redmonds, Wells) – 1:38
7. "G to D" – 2:17
8. "Sunny Places" – 2:33
9. "Horse and Cart" – 3:00
10. "Squirrels" – 2:26
11. "Cricklewood" – 2:36
12. "B" (Crighton, Redmonds, Wells) – 2:18
13. "Punchline" – 1:23
14. "Who" – 3:09

"G to D" is titled "Gone to the Dogs" on the Deceptive Records release.

== Personnel ==
- Duncan – vocals, drums
- Loz – guitar
- Andy – bass
- Recorded in November, 1995
- Produced by Snuff
- Assistant engineered by Steve Clow
