= Disposable Income (album) =

Studio album by Snuff
- Released: 4 March 2003
- Genre: Punk rock
- Length: 61:24
- Label: Union 2112
- Producer: Paul Corkett; Snuff

Snuff chronology
Numb Nuts (2000)	Disposable Income (2003)	Six of One, Half a Dozen of the Other (2005)

Professional ratings
Review scores
Source	Rating
AllMusic	3/5 stars
Punknews.org	3.5/5 stars

Disposable Income is an album by English punk rock band Snuff. It was released in March 2003 on the Union 2112 record label. The band previously released many albums on American independent label Fat Wreck Chords.

== Track listing ==
- All songs written by Snuff
1. "Angels 1-5" – 3:50
2. "Other Half of You" – 2:30
3. "Chocs Away" – 2:33
4. "Once Upon a Time Far Far Away" – 2:20
5. "Dehumanised" – 4:57
6. "7 Days (Solomons Boring Week)" – 2:03
7. "To Disappoint" – 3:50
8. "Heads You Win Tails You Lose" – 6:08
9. "Boatnick (So It Goes)" – 3:49
10. "Wearenowhere" – 1:41
11. "Salad" – 2:43
12. "Lies" – 2:33
13. "Pages 42-43" – 4:34
14. "Coming Through" – 3:19
15. "Emoticon" – 11:04
16. "All Over Now" – 3:30

== Credits ==
- Duncan Redmonds – vocals, drums
- Frank Stapleton – guitar
- Pete Zapasta – guitar
- Leo Erinmold – bass
- DJ Shadwell – piano, percussion
- Cookie Saban – harmonica
- Terry Edwards – saxophone, trumpet, keyboards
- G. Granville – trombone
- Hurmarna Tehwin – keyboards
- Produced by Paul Corkett and Snuff
- Engineered by Dan Austin
