= Potatoes and Melons Wholesale Prices Straight from the Lock Up =

Studio album by Snuff
- Released: 29 July 1997
- Genre: Punk rock
- Length: 23:39
- Label: Deceptive Records; Fat Wreck Chords
- Producer: Snuff

Snuff chronology
Demmamussabebonk (1996)	Potatoes and Melons Wholesale Prices Straight from the Lock Up (1997)	Tweet Tweet My Lovely (1998)

Professional ratings
Review scores
Source	Rating
Allmusic	link

Potatoes and Melons Wholesale Prices Straight from the Lock Up is an album of mostly cover versions performed by English punk rock band, Snuff. It was released in July 1997 on American independent label, Fat Wreck Chords. The UK version (on the Deceptive label) is called Potatoes and Melons at Wholesale Prices Direct to You the Public and does not contain tracks 3, 4 and 6 which were already released in the UK as b-sides to the "Do Do Do" single.

== Track listing ==
1. "Rivers of Babylon" (Dowe, McNaughton) – 1:37
2. "Whatever Happened to the Likely Lads" (Hugg, LaFrenais) – 2:12
3. "Standing in the Shadows of Love" (Holland-Dozier-Holland) – 2:09
4. "Soul Limbo" (Dunn, Jackson, Jones) – 3:11
5. "Come and Gone" (Redmonds) – 2:16
6. "It Must Be Boring Being Snuff" (Tyler) – 1:17
7. "Ye Olde Folke Twatte" (traditional) – 2:47
8. "Magic Moments" (Bacharach, David) – 2:18
9. "Russian Fields" (traditional) – 2:09
10. "Time Dub" (Redmonds) – 0:50
11. "Pink Purple" (Murphy, Redmonds) – 2:53

== Credits ==
- Duncan – vocals, drums
- Loz – guitar
- Lee B. – bass
- Dave – trombone
- Lee M. – Hammond B-3 organ
- Produced by Snuff
