= In Here We Fall =

Studio album by Electrasy
- Released: 2000
- Genre: Alternative rock
- Label: Arista
- Producer: Matthew Wilder, Glen Ballard

Electrasy chronology
Beautiful Insane (1998)	In Here We Fall (2000)

In Here We Fall is the second album by British rock band Electrasy, released on 26 September 2000 to capitalise on interest in the single "Morning Afterglow" in the United States. It was later released in Japan on 7 February 2001, with the song "Renegades" released as a promo single in early January the same year. It was produced by Matthew Wilder and engineered by Chris Brown.

The album also contains a cover version of Led Zeppelin's version of "Dazed and Confused". The song "Renegades" was featured as the end theme to the film Monkeybone. The song "Cosmic Castaway" was featured in the soundtrack of the film Titan A.E..

"Rocket Man" is a bonus track on the Japanese version of the album.

== Track listing ==
All songs written by Nigel Nisbet with the exception of "Dazed and Confused" - "Jake Holmes"

1. "Renegades"
2. "Naked"
3. "Morning Afterglow"
4. "Dazed and Confused"
5. "Bussed Out"
6. "Cosmic Castaway"
7. "Special Forces"
8. "Foot Soldierz"
9. "In Here We Fall"
10. "Angel"
11. "Cry"
12. "Rocket Man" (Bonus Track)

== Personnel ==
- Ali McKinnell – lead vocals
- Nigel Nisbet – guitar
- Steve Atkins – guitar
- Alex Meadows – bass
- Paul Pridmore – drums
- Jim Hayden – keyboards

=== Production personnel ===
- Matthew Wilder – producer
- Jon Sweet – producer on "Morning Afterglow"
- Nigel Nisbet – producer on "Cosmic Castaway"
- Glen Ballard – producer on "Cosmic Castaway"
- Jack Joseph Puig – mixer
- Richard Ash – assistant mix engineer
- Chris Brown – mixer on "Morning Afterglow"
- Pete Lorimer – engineer
- Paul Corkett – engineer
- Steve Baughman – assistant engineer
- Quentin Dunn – assistant engineer
- Jeffrey Schulz – design, direction, layout design
