= Love and Peace and Sympathy =

Studio album by Six by Seven
- Released: 16 April 2013
- Recorded: Moles Studio, Bath
- Length: 52:31
- Label: Borrowed Tune Motion Pictures
- Producer: Dan Austin

Six by Seven chronology
If Symptoms Persist, Kill Your Doctor (2007)	Love and Peace and Sympathy (2013)

Love and Peace and Sympathy is the 7th studio album by Nottingham band, Six by Seven.

== Track listing ==
No.	Title	Length
1.	"Change"	6:19
2.	"Sympathy"	6:20
3.	"Truce"	8:49
4.	"More"	3:21
5.	"Standing in the Light"	7:27
6.	"The Rise and Fall and Decline of Everything"	4:42
7.	"Colder"	6:32
8.	"Crying"	3:19
9.	"Fall into Your Arms"	5:42

== Personnel ==
- Chris Olley - Composer, Guitar, Vocals
- Martin Cooper - Guitar
- James Flower - Keyboards, Organ (Hammond)
- Steve Hewitt - Drums, Vocals
- Pete Stevenson - Bass
