= Flibbiddydibbiddydob =

Flibbidydibbidydob

EP by Snuff
- Released: 1990 (original release); 20 August 1996 (re-release)
- Recorded: 1990
- Genre: Punk rock
- Length: 17:41
- Label: Workers Playtime; Fat Wreck Chords
- Producer: Snuff

Snuff chronology
| Snuff Said (1989) | Flibbidydibbidydob (1990) | Reach (1992) |

Flibbidydibbidydob is an EP of cover versions, including commercial jingles and a TV theme, by English punk rock band, Snuff. It was originally released in 1990 by Workers Playtime Records in the UK, and was later re-released in August 1996 on Fat Wreck Chords.

== Track listing ==
1. "Rods and Mockers" – 1:26
2. "Do Nothing" (The Specials)– 2:15
3. "Shake 'N' Vac" (from the commercial for the carpet freshener)– 0:49
4. "I Can't Explain" (The Who) – 1:53
5. "Ecstacy" – 2:03
6. "Reach Out (I'll Be There)" (The Four Tops) – 2:05
7. "Hazy Shade of Winter" (Simon & Garfunkel) – 1:51
8. "Do It Quick" (from the Do It All DIY chain commercial)– 0:53
9. "City Baby Attacked by Rats" (GBH) – 1:40
10. "Bran Flakes" (from the Kellogg's cereal commercial)– 0:52
11. "In Sickness and In Health" (Chas & Dave - the theme from the TV series) – 1:54

== Credits ==
- Duncan Redmonds – vocals, drums
- Simon Wells – guitar
- Andy Crighton – bass
- Dave Redmonds – trombone (credited as "New Improved Dave On Bone")
- Produced by Snuff
