= Tweet Tweet My Lovely =

Studio album by Snuff
- Released: 19 May 1998
- Genre: Punk rock
- Length: 31:42
- Label: Fat Wreck Chords
- Producer: Snuff

Snuff chronology
| Potatoes and Melons... (1997) | Tweet Tweet My Lovely (1998) | Numb Nuts (2000) |

Professional ratings
Review scores
| Source | Rating |
|---|---|
| AllMusic | 4/5 stars |
| Punknews.org | 4/5 stars |

Tweet Tweet My Lovely is an album by the English punk rock band Snuff. It was released in 1998 on Fat Wreck Chords.

== Critical reception ==
AllMusic wrote that "Snuff has ability, humor, throaty vocals, and nine different tempos to work in, as well as the occasional nutty brass and pretty '60s organ."

== Track listing ==
- All songs written by Snuff, unless otherwise stated
1. "No Reason" – 2:11
2. "Ticket" – 2:02
3. "Timebomb" – 0:46
4. "Lyehf Taidu Leikh" – 2:58
5. "Nick Motown" (Redmonds) – 2:25
6. "Brickwall" – 1:46
7. "Arsehole" – 2:37
8. "Bob" – 1:12
9. "All You Need" – 2:31
10. "Etc." – 1:40
11. "Thief" – 2:52
12. "Verdidn't" – 2:23
13. "Bit Cosy" (Batsford, Murphy, Redmonds, Wong) – 2:14
14. "Take Me Home (Piss Off)" – 4:05

== Credits ==
- Duncan Redmonds – vocals, drums
- Loz Wong – guitar
- Lee Batsford – bass
- Produced by Snuff
- Engineered by Harvey Birrell
- Mixed by Ryan Greene
