= Numb Nuts =

Studio album by Snuff
- Released: 21 March 2000
- Genre: Punk rock
- Length: 31:30
- Label: Fat Wreck Chords
- Producer: Punk Nuts

Snuff chronology
Tweet Tweet My Lovely (1998)	Numb Nuts (2000)	Disposable Income (2003)

Numb Nuts is an album by the English punk rock band Snuff. It was released in March 2000 on the American independent label Fat Wreck Chords.

== Critical reception ==
Professional ratings
Review scores
Source	Rating
AllMusic	3/5 stars
The Encyclopedia of Popular Music	3/5 stars
Punknews.org	1.5/5 stars

Exclaim! deemed the album "16 tracks of driving, witty, horny, organ-tastic mod-punk fun."

== Track listing ==
- All songs written by Snuff
1. "Pixies" – 2:15
2. "Yuki" – 2:20
3. "SQII" – 2:35
4. "Marbles" – 2:28
5. "Numb Nuts" – 2:23
6. "Reach" – 1:52
7. "Another Wet Weekend at the Tundra Theme Park" – 2:21
8. "EFL vs. Concrete" – 2:31
9. "Fuck Off" – 0:35
10. "Chalk Me Down for More" – 1:43
11. "It's a Long Way Down" – 2:34
12. "Romeo & Juliet" – 2:11
13. "Soup of the Day" – 1:46
14. "Hilda Ogden and the Thick Plottens" – 2:00
15. "Sweet Days" – 1:49
16. "Cake" – 0:07

== Credits ==
- Duncan – vocals, drums
- Loz – guitar
- Lee B. – bass
- Lee Murphy – Hammond organ
- Steve Cox – Hammond organ
- Produced by Snuff
