= Black Market Music (album) =

2000 studio album by Placebo

Studio album by Placebo
- Released: 9 October 2000
- Recorded: Late 1999 – mid 2000
- Studios: Olympic Studios, Townhouse Studios and Moody Studios in London, England
- Genre: Glam punk
- Length: 55:44
- Label: Hut
- Producer: Paul Corkett

Placebo chronology
Without You I'm Nothing (1998)	Black Market Music (2000)	Sleeping with Ghosts (2003)

Singles from Black Market Music
- 1. "Taste in Men" Released: 17 July 2000; 2. "Slave to the Wage" Released: 25 September 2000; 3. "Special K" Released: 19 March 2001; 4. "Black-Eyed" Released: 8 October 2001

Black Market Music is the third studio album by British alternative rock band Placebo, released on 9 October 2000 by record label Hut. The album took nine months to record, from late 1999 to mid-2000; at the time, it was the longest the band had spent recording an album until 2022's Never Let Me Go.

Four singles were released from the album: "Taste in Men", "Slave to the Wage", "Special K" and "Black-Eyed". The album reached number 6 in the UK Albums Chart and received a generally favourable reaction from music critics.

== Background and content ==
Speaking to Kerrang! in June 2009, Brian Molko remembered:

We had a real swagger and bravado when we went into the studio for this one. We had just come off a really successful tour and felt we'd really exploded. We felt like cowboys of rock! We were also really heavily medicated and beginning to get quite deep into drugs. That's probably why it took nine months to make an album. The drugs also contributed to a certain amount of arrogance. At least that's what I remember from the time. I think we had a desire to write about the world we saw around us. We thought it was cool that, though other people were a little afraid to get deep down and dirty, we could take it on ourselves to write about those things. I think that album was the start of us trying to mix genres. We had so much hatred for rap-rock bands like Limp Bizkit and all they represented – misogyny, homophobia and commercialism – that we wanted to do our own version of it.

The album is dedicated to music publicist Scott Piering, who died of cancer in early 2000. The song "Commercial for Levi" is a reference to the sound technician Levi Tecofski, who on one occasion saved frontman Brian Molko's life: Molko, drunk and about to cross the road, was quickly pulled back by Tecofski from the path of an approaching vehicle.

== Reception ==
Professional ratings
Aggregate scores
Source	Rating
Metacritic	65/100
Review scores
Source	Rating
AllMusic	4/5 stars
Alternative Press	4/5 stars
Christgau's Consumer Guide	ambiguous
Drowned in Sound	8/10
NME	unfavorable
Pitchfork	2.4/10
PopMatters	neutral
Rolling Stone	2.5/5 stars
Q	3/5 stars
Trouser Press	neutral

Black Market Music received a generally favourable critical response, though a less enthusiastic reception than previous records. Dean Carlson of AllMusic wrote that "Black Market Music finds Molko in such moody lust that his strangled, androgynous wailing rivals anything the band has previously flashed to the world [...] Placebo seem to have finally found that sweet wet spot between beauty and perversion." Dale Price of Drowned in Sound called it "a heavily revised upgrade of their back catalogue. And then some." Nicholas Taylor of PopMatters called it "highly listenable dark guitar rock".

Among its detractors were NME, who called it "a case of ambition eclipsing talent, of hubris, of a band losing the plot. Placebo's frame of reference has always been narrow, but they've now been reduced to empty gestures without any visionary tunes to tip the balance." Pitchfork's negative review from 2000 was edited in 2025 to remove "several instances of biphobic language."

In 2016, Brian Molko ranked this as his least favourite Placebo album.

== Track listing ==
All tracks are written by Placebo, except where noted.

No.	Title	Writer(s)	Length
1.	"Taste in Men"		4:15
2.	"Days Before You Came"		2:33
3.	"Special K"		3:52
4.	"Spite & Malice" (featuring Justin Warfield)	Placebo; Justin Warfield	3:37
5.	"Passive Aggressive"		5:24
6.	"Black-Eyed"		3:48
7.	"Blue American"		3:31
8.	"Slave to the Wage"	Kannberg; Malkmus; Placebo	4:06
9.	"Commercial for Levi"		2:20
10.	"Haemoglobin"		3:46
11.	"Narcoleptic"		4:22
12.	"Peeping Tom" (all versions except the vinyl edition contain the hidden track "Black Market Blood", starting at 10:14)		14:10
Total length:			55:44

Japanese and U.S. release bonus tracks
No.	Title	Writer(s)	Length
13.	"Without You I'm Nothing" (featuring David Bowie)		4:15
14.	"I Feel You" (Depeche Mode cover; hidden track "Black Market Blood" begins at 11:23)	Martin Gore	15:19

== Personnel ==
Placebo

- Brian Molko – vocals, guitar, keyboards, 6-string bass, production, mixing
- Stefan Olsdal – bass, guitar, 6-string bass, keyboards, backing vocals, production, mixing
- Steve Hewitt – drums, percussion, production, mixing

Additional personnel

- Rob Ellis – string arrangements
- Bill Lloyd – bass on "Peeping Tom"
- Severe Loren – backing vocals on "Taste in Men" and "Special K"
- Dimitri Tikovoï – string programming
- Justin Warfield – rapping vocals on "Spite & Malice"

Technical

- Paul Collins – sleeve art direction
- Ian Cooper – mastering
- Paul Corkett – production, mixing
- Lorraine Francis – engineering
- Scott Kannberg – sampling
- Dare Mason – production
- Kevin Westenberg – sleeve art direction, sleeve photography

== Charts ==
=== Weekly charts ===
Chart (2000)	Peak position
Australian Albums (ARIA)	18
Austrian Albums (Ö3 Austria)	7
Belgian Albums (Ultratop Flanders)	10
Belgian Albums (Ultratop Wallonia)	3
Dutch Albums (Album Top 100)	28
European Top 100 Albums (Music & Media)	4
Finnish Albums (Suomen virallinen lista)	24
French Albums (SNEP)	1
German Albums (Offizielle Top 100)	4
Irish Albums (IRMA)	12
Italian Albums (FIMI)	9
New Zealand Albums (RMNZ)	22
Norwegian Albums (VG-lista)	9
Scottish Albums (Official Charts)	4
Swedish Albums (Sverigetopplistan)	17
Swiss Albums (Schweizer Hitparade)	15
UK Albums (Official Charts)	6

=== Year-end charts ===
Chart (2000)	Position
Belgian Albums (Ultratop Wallonia)	98

== Certifications ==
Region	Certification	Certified units/sales
Australia (ARIA)	Gold	35,000^{^}
Belgium (BRMA)	Platinum	50,000^{*}
France (SNEP)	2× Gold	200,000^{*}
Germany (BVMI)	Gold	150,000^{^}
Italy (FIMI)	Gold	50,000^{*}
Switzerland (IFPI Switzerland)	Gold	25,000^{^}
United Kingdom (BPI)	Gold	100,000^{^}
^{*} Sales figures based on certification alone.^{^} Shipments figures based on certification alone.
