= The Heart Throbs (band) =

English indie rock band

- Origin: Reading, England
- Genres: Alternative rock
- Years active: 1986–1993
- Labels: In-Tape; Rough Trade; Profumo; One Little Indian; Elektra; A&M
- Past members: Rose Carlotti; Rachel DeFreitas; Mark Side; Stephen Ward; Alan Barclay aka Alan Borgia; Noko; Steve Monti; Colleen Browne; Steve Beswick

The Heart Throbs were an indie rock band from Reading, England. They released three albums on the One Little Indian label before splitting up in 1993.

== Career ==
The Heart Throbs formed in 1986, initially by Rose Carlotti and Stephen Ward, both college students, who recruited Rose's sister Rachel DeFreitas and Mark Side. Rose and Rachel are sisters of the late Echo & the Bunnymen drummer Pete DeFreitas. The band released their first single in mid-1987 on Marc Riley's In-Tape label. They were then signed by Rough Trade, for whom they released two singles, both hits on the UK Independent Chart. After two further singles on their own label, Profumo (a reference to John Profumo), the Heart Throbs were signed by the UK label One Little Indian Records. Guitarist Alan Barclay a.k.a. Alan Borgia joined at this time, allowing original guitarist Ward to move to keyboards. Their first album, Cleopatra Grip, was distributed in the US by Elektra Records, after which they were signed by A&M Records, who released Jubilee Twist in the US. After disappointing sales, however, A&M elected not to distribute their third and final album, Vertical Smile. The first and third albums were named after euphemisms for female genitalia, while the jubilee twist is a martial combat technique for attacking the male genitalia.

The Heart Throbs' single "Dreamtime" reached a peak position of number 2 on the Billboard Modern Rock Tracks chart in 1990, and their single "She's in a Trance" reached number 21 in the same year.

Following the Cleopatra Grip tour, the rhythm section left the band, and were replaced by Noko (ex-Luxuria) on bass and Steve Monti (ex-Blockheads) on drums. By the third album, the band had switched to a third rhythm section of Colleen Browne on bass (formerly of the Parachute Men, who later joined Pale Saints) and Steve Beswick on drums.

After the Heart Throbs split up in 1993, Rose Carlotti and Steve Beswick formed the group Angora, who then changed their name to Tom Patrol before eventually disbanding.

== Members ==
The initial lineup was:

- Rose Carlotti (born Rosemarie DeFreitas, 16 December 1963) – lead vocals/guitar
- Rachel DeFreitas (born 25 May 1966) – bass/backing vocals - left in 1991
- Mark Side (born 24 June 1969) – drums - left in 1991
- Stephen Ward (born 19 April 1963) – guitar

Other members:

- Alan Borgia (born Alan Barclay, 4 April 1968, Singapore) - guitar (1988–1993)
- Noko - bass guitar (1991–1992)
- Steve Monti - drums (1991–1992)
- Colleen Browne - bass guitar (1992–1993)
- Steve Beswick - drums (1993)

== Discography ==
=== Albums ===
- Cleopatra Grip (1990), One Little Indian/Elektra
- Jubilee Twist (1992), One Little Indian/A&M
- Vertical Smile (1993), One Little Indian

=== Singles & EPs ===
- "Toy" (1987), In Tape
- "Bang" (1988), Rough Trade - UK Indie No. 26
- "Too Many Shadows" (1988), Rough Trade - UK Indie No. 17
- "Here I Hide" (1988), Profumo
- "Blood from a Stone" (1989), Profumo
- "She's In A Trance" (1990), One Little Indian
- "I Wonder Why" (1990), One Little Indian
- "Dreamtime" (1990), One Little Indian
- Total Abandon EP (1991), One Little Indian (Turn Away / Pumping (My Heart) / Bright Green Day / Turn Away [12" Mix])
- Spongy Thing EP (1992), One Little Indian (So Far / Hooligan / Laughing And Falling / Kiss Me When I'm Starving [Mastodon Mix])
- "Outside" (1992), A&M Records
- "Worser" (1993), One Little Indian
