= Nat Birchall =

British musician

Nat Birchall is a British saxophonist, composer, and bandleader of the Nat Birchall Quartet and Nat Birchall Sextet. He lives in Derbyshire in the north of England.

== Biography ==
Birchall was born and lives in the North of England. He was born in Chorley, Lancashire and lived as a child Brinscall, Lancashire. His father was a tree cutter and his mother worked in the weaving mills. As of 2006 he lives in rural Derbyshire.

== Discography ==
=== Nat Birchall ===
- Sixth Sense (1999)
- Akhenaten (Gondwana, 2009)
- Guiding Spirit (Gondwana, 2010)
- Sacred Dimension (Gondwana, 2011)
- World Without Form (Soul and Spirit, 2012)
- Invocations (Jazzman, 2015)
- Creation (Soul and Spirit, 2016)
- Cosmic Language (Jazzman, 2018)
- Mysticism of Sound (Ancient Archive of Sound, 2020)
- Ancient Africa (Ancient Archive of Sound, 2021) – Birchall plays reed and percussion instruments, piano, bass and drums

=== Nat Birchall Quartet ===
- Live in Larissa by Nat Birchall Quintet (Soul and Spirit, 2014)
- The Storyteller: a Musical Tribute To Yusef Lateef (2019)

=== Nat Birchall Sextet ===
- Exaltation / Live In Athens Vol 1 (Parafono, 2020)
