= Warm Jets =

- Origin: United Kingdom
- Genres: Indie pop, alternative rock
- Years active: 1995–1998
- Past members: Louis Jones, Paul Noble, Ed Grimshaw, Colleen Browne, Alex Lee, Aki Shibahara

Warm Jets were a British indie pop band, who had two UK top 40 singles and a top 40 album in 1998. The group's name derives from Brian Eno's 1973 album, Here Come the Warm Jets.

== History ==
The band was formed in 1995 by Louis Jones, Paul Noble (formerly of Eat) and Ed Grimshaw, and signed to This Way Up records in early 1996. They recruited former Pale Saints, Parachute Men and Rialto member Colleen Browne on bass guitar 1995–1997. She was replaced by Aki Shibahara.

After the release of their debut EP Autopia the band received positive press and played prestigious support slots and festival appearances, including an arena tour with Blur. The band appeared on NME's annual tour of up and coming bands in early 1998.

Their only album, Future Signs, was released in 1998, mixed by Glyn Johns. The band had top forty hits in Britain with "Never Never" and "Hurricane".

The band had some tabloid fame when singer Louis Jones had a relationship with DJ Zoë Ball. They were also often namechecked by Jones's friend and media buddy Paul Kaye under his Dennis Pennis alter ego.

Paul Noble left the band. The remaining trio recruited former Strangelove and Blue Aeroplanes guitarist Alex Lee. The group disbanded shortly after Island Records dropped them. Louis Jones has continued making music and is on Spotify, known as 'Shriek of an eagle'.

== Line-up ==
- Louis Jones – lead vocals and guitar
- Paul Noble – guitar and Keyboards (replaced temporarily by Alex Lee as a touring member)
- Craig 'Ed' Grimshaw – drums and keyboards
- Colleen Browne – bass and vocals 1995–1997
- Aki Shibahara – bass and vocals 1997-

== Discography ==
=== Albums ===
- Future Signs (1998), This Way Up – UK No. 40

=== Singles ===
- Autopia EP (1996), This Way Up
- "Never Never" (1997), This Way Up
- "Move Away" EP (1997), This Way Up – UK No. 90
- "Hurricane" (1997), This Way Up
- "Never Never" (1998), This Way Up – UK No. 37
- "Hurricane" (1998), Island – UK No. 34
