= Covo Club =

Alternative music club in Bologna, Italy

- Casalone
- Interactive map of Covo Club
- Address: Viale Zagabria, 1 Bologna; Italy
- Coordinates: 44.507477°N 11.377381°E
- Events: Alternative rock, Indie rock

Construction
- Opened: 1980

Website
- http://covoclub.it/

The Covo Club is an alternative music club in Bologna, Italy. The club has hosted many notable bands since its opening in 1980, including Franz Ferdinand, Mumford & Sons, The Gossip, Animal Collective, The XX, The Decemberists, Apparat, Jay Reatard, The Libertines, Black Mountain, Liars, Kings of Convenience, Peaches, Blonde Redhead, Ladytron, The Brian Jonestown Massacre, Teenage Fanclub, and The Undertones.
