= Artists Cannibals Poets Thieves =

Studio album by Six by Seven
- Released: June 6, 2005
- Recorded: 2005
- Genre: Indie rock, space rock
- Length: 40:07
- Label: Saturday Night Sunday Morning
- Producer: Six by Seven

Six by Seven chronology
Left Luggage at the Peveril Hotel (2005)	Artists Cannibals Poets Thieves (2005)	Club Sandwich at the Peveril Hotel (2006)

Professional ratings
Review scores
Source	Rating
Gigwise	4/5 stars
Stylus Magazine	B

Artists Cannibals Poets Thieves was Six by Seven's fifth studio album and the third on their own Saturday Night Sunday Morning Records label, however, one more "unofficial album" had a limited release in January 2006: Club Sandwich at the Peveril Hotel.

== Track listing ==
1. "All I Really Want from You Is Love" - 4:30
2. "Nowhere to Go But Home" - 5:51
3. "In My Time (We Don't Belong)" - 3:15
4. "Tonight (I Wanna Make It Out)" - 5:56
5. "(I Gotta) Get It Together Again" - 4:24
6. "Stara Paris Rescued Me" - 6:24
7. "Just Get It Down" - 2:28
8. "Let's Throw Some Mud at the Wall" - 2:44
9. "You Know I Feel Alright Now" - 4:32
