= Snuff (British band) =

British punk rock band

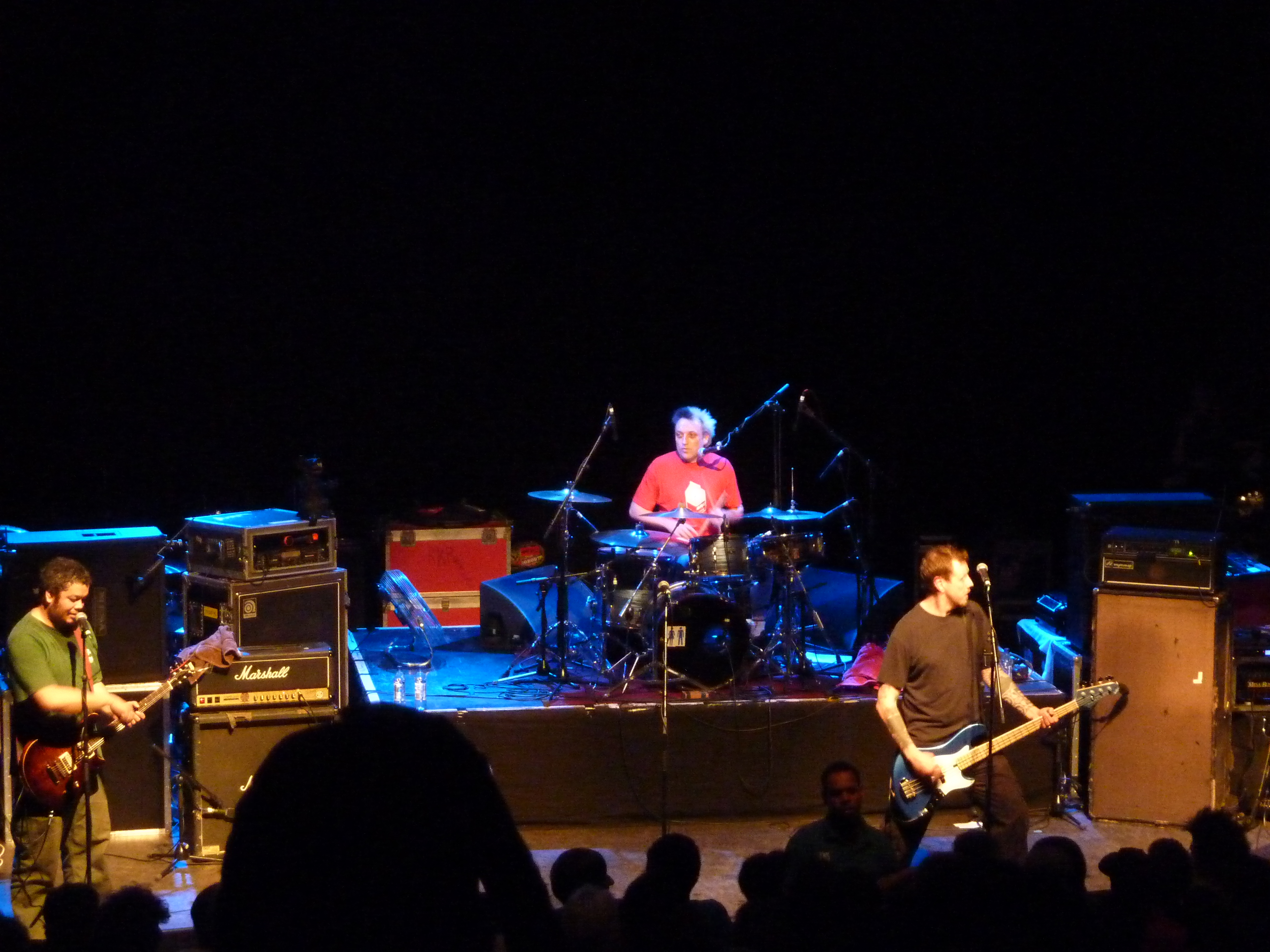
- Snuff in May 2009

Background information
- Origin: Hendon, London, England
- Genres: Melodic hardcore, punk rock
- Years active: 1986–1991, 1994–present
- Labels: SBÄM Records, 10past12records, Fat Wreck Chords, K Records, Pizza of Death Records, Union 2112
- Members: Duncan Redmonds – Drums and vocals Loz Wong – Guitar and backing vocals Dan Goatham - Bass and backing vocals Oliver Stewart – Trombone; Lee Murphy – Keyboards and backing vocals Flo Redmonds - Saxophone
- Past members: Simon Wells – Guitar and vocals Andy Crighton – Bass; Lee Batsford/Erinmez – Bass and backing vocals Sarah de Courcy-Aston – Keyboards; Terry Edwards – Keyboards and brass Paul Thomson – Guitar and vocals Dave Redmonds – Trombone

Snuff are a British punk rock band formed in Hendon in 1986. The original line-up was Duncan Redmonds on drums and vocals, Simon Wells on guitar and vocals and Andy Crighton on bass, with Dave Redmonds being added to the line-up on trombone before the release of Flibbiddydibbiddydob.

Snuff have released their material through a variety of independent record labels including their own, 10past12records, as well as on Fat Wreck Chords, a label owned by Fat Mike of NOFX.

== History ==
=== Early years ===
During the early 1980s, guitarist Duncan Jones, after having moved to London from Ipswich, and bassist Scruff. Scruff invited Simon Wells to be the band's vocalist, knowing him through school, but Jones did not want Wells to join due to the length of his hair being too long. After a few years, Wells cut his hair, joining the band on vocals and guitar and Jones moved to drums. At this time, they covered Government Issue's album Boycott Stabb (1983) and a version of Jimi Hendrix's song "Purple Haze" which featured hardcore-influence drumming.

Years later, in 1986, Wells was a member of indie rock band Jim, Millions Will Die with bassist Andy Crighton, whom Jones filled in on drums for a rehearsal. When Jim, Millions Will Die, and Jones' band Come What May disbanded that year, Jones and Wells formed a new band alongside bassist Neil Brighton, but a short time later Brighton departed, leading to hiring of Crighton. During this time, the band went through a series of names including Tarmac Delight and Zinc Sinks, but settled upon the name Snuff, inspired by slurred the phrase "That's enough" while drunk.

The band played live for the first time on 10 March 1987 at New Merlin's Cave in Kings Cross. Their second live performance was over a year later, in May 1988, at Hendon venue LMS (London Midland & Scottish - now called The Claddagh Ring), which they began playing monthly at. They began to gain a local following once they played the Sir George Robey on 5 September and they soon began performing frequently across London. On 15 January 1989, they recorded a Peel Session for BBC Radio 1, which gained them national notoriety. They spent the rest of the year on a series of tours across the United Kingdom and Ireland, as well as one tour across mainland Europe.

The band signed to the Workers Playtime label and their first release was the Not Listening EP, which received regular airplay from BBC Radio 1 disc jockey John Peel, and reached number nine in the UK Independent Chart. Their first album was named Snuff Said, but the full album name was Snuffsaidbutgorblimeyguvstonemeifhedidn'tthrowawobblerchachachachachachachachachachachayou'regoinghomeinacosmicambience, which started their habit of playing on their supposed Cockney roots. The album peaked at number three on the UK Indie Chart.

Following up from their first album was the 'mini-album' Flibbiddydibbiddydob, featuring mainly cover versions and TV commercial jingles reworked by the band. The release was the subject of a disagreement with the British Phonographic Industry (BPI); Snuff maintained it was an EP, and as such should be eligible for the UK Singles Chart, but the BPI insisted on classifying it as an album because of the large number of tracks.

In 1991, the band entered the studio to record a second album, immediately followed by a tour of mainland Europe. During this recording process Wells became disinterested in playing guitar, and during the tour found himself disillusioned with the band's lack of involvement with the album's mixing, due to their distance. They completed the tour and their additional dates that were already booked, including a tour of Japan. Upon returning home, the band disbanded.

During this period all three members applied to be the bassist for Leatherface. The break-up also spawned Guns n' Wankers and Your Mum in 1993–1994 and whose lineup included Simon Wells, Loz Wong, Rory Blaney, Paul McMahon and Tony Poole.

=== Reformation ===
Following a reformation of the original line-up in 1994, along with permanent Hammond and trombone, Simon Wells left the band and was replaced by Loz Wong who had played in Guns n' Wankers with Simon. A while later Andy Crighton was replaced by Lee Erinmez (née Batsford) on bass. They released a Christmas single, the theme to "Whatever Happened to the Likely Lads?". Steve Lamacq has also featured Snuff on his radio show. Simon Wells has since formed the band Southport, and has played occasionally with Duncan under the name Footballer's Wives.

In 2005, Snuff released a greatest hits double album. Also in 2005, Duncan Redmonds released a self-titled solo project CD, Billy No Mates, and at live shows his solo material is combined with some Snuff and Guns n' Wankers songs. Billy No Mates have two touring bands, one in Japan and one in the UK, and Redmonds has recorded different EP's with each band.

In 2006 a new band called Pot Kettle Black formed. This featured Redmonds on drums, Wells on guitar, and Wes Wasley completing the trio on bass. The line-up played a mixture of old Snuff songs (generally up until Demmamussabebonk) and new material in the same vein. The project was pronounced 'dead' by Redmonds on the 10past12 Records website guestbook in August 2007. Since then, Redmonds has played a series of gigs in Japan with Duncan's Divas, and embarked on solo acoustic gigs in the UK.

In 2008, a brief tour of Japan was announced, featuring gigs in Tokyo. Following this, the band continued to gig in 2009, supporting NOFX in Birmingham and London on their UK tour, and played both the Reading and Leeds Festivals.

=== Bubble and Squeak ===
In 2009, Duncan Redmonds released Bubble and Squeak. The album featured collaborations with numerous members of bands on similar labels or tours, including Fat Mike from NOFX, Frankie Stubbs from Leatherface and Ken Yokoyama from the Japanese punk band Hi-Standard, as well as former and current members of Snuff, Billy No Mates and Pot Kettle Black. Notably, the album also included a new track recorded by Guns n' Wankers, the first since bassist Jools Parkin suffered a brain haemorrhage.

=== Don't Wake Up the Kids ===
In March 2010, an album titled Don't Wake Up The Kids, which featured acoustic tracks recorded by Duncan Redmonds, Joey Cape of Lagwagon and Ken Yokoyama of Hi-Standard, was released on Inyaface Records. To coincide with the release of the album, Duncan Redmonds and Joey Cape toured Japan, playing a series of acoustic shows.

=== 2011 to present ===
The band undertook another short tour of Japan in 2011, as well as the recording and release of a tour EP, entitled 5-4-3-2-1 Ding-a-Ling Yahon, which consisted of new songs and Japanese covers.

In spring 2012, the band took to the road for a 10-date UK tour, with Oliver Stewart taking over trombone duties from Dave Redmonds. Shows included The Borderline, London, and Trillians, Newcastle. Snuff also appeared at the 2012 Rebellion festival, in Blackpool, alongside bands such as Rancid and SNFU, as well as being lead support for the summer 2012 NOFX UK tour.

In 2012, Snuff recorded their first full-length album since 2003's Disposable Income. The album, titled 5-4-3-2-1 Perhaps?, contains 12 new tracks and was released on 8 January 2013. The vinyl was released in black vinyl, limited edition purple vinyl with green haze (407 copies) and even more limited green vinyl with Fat Record Store labels (100 copies). The album also came as a CD version along with a Japanese issue with exclusive artwork.

In August 2015, Snuff completed a full UK tour supporting Bad Religion. In February 2016, they celebrated '30 Years of Snuff' with a full UK tour.

In September 2019, Snuff released a new album, There's A Lot of It About, on Fat Wreck Chords, recorded in 2018. Lee Erinmez left the band shortly after the recording and was replaced by Dan Goatham. In May 2020, Snuff released a new EP, The Wrath of Thoth.

In 2021, Snuff began recording a brand new album with a small run of UK dates. This marks the return of Dave Redmonds on trombone, with his daughter Flo Redmonds adding saxophone and giving the band a three-part brass section.

In 2022, Snuff announced a new 10-track album, Crepuscolo dorato della bruschetta borsetta calzetta cacchetta trombetta lambretta giallo ossido, ooooooh cosi magnifico! This was followed in 2024 by the album Off On The Charabanc.

In July 2026 it was announced that trombonist Dave Redmonds had passed away after a long battle with cancer.

== Musical style and influences ==
Snuff's music has been categorised by critics as melodic hardcore.

Snuff have cited influences including Hüsker Dü, GBH, Madness, Purple Hearts, Government Issue, Booker T. Jones, the MGs, the Who, Small Faces, the Clash, Discharge, the Action, the Chords, the Meters, Dexys Midnight Runners, Scream, the Damned, the Exploited, Minor Threat, Bad Brains, Buzzcocks and the Specials.

They have been cited as an influence by Samiam, Mega City Four, Less Than Jake, Therapy? and Senseless Things. A 2022 article by Alternative Press named them as one of the "bands [that] paved the way for pop punk".

Trombonist Dave Redmonds died on 11 July 2026, aged 66.

== Discography ==
=== Studio albums ===
Album	Year
Snuff Said	1989
Reach	1992
Demmamussabebonk	1996
Potatoes and Melons Wholesale Prices Straight from the Lock Up	1997
Tweet Tweet My Lovely	1998
Numb Nuts	2000
Disposable Income	2003
Greasy Hair Makes Money	2004
5-4-3-2-1-Perhaps?	2012
There's A Lot Of It About	2019
Crepuscolo dorato della bruschetta borsetta calzetta cacchetta trombetta lambretta giallo ossido, ooooooh cosi magnifico!	2022
Off On The Charabanc	2024

=== Compilation albums ===
Album	Year
Six of One, Half a Dozen of the Other: 1986–2002 (double album)	2005
Spleurk 2	1990

=== Live albums ===
Album	Year
Kilburn National 27.11.90	1995
Caught In Session (Taken from BBC Radio 1 Evening Sessions)	1997
Kilburn National / Caught In Session (double album)	2003
Crepuscolo dorato - Live takes	2022

=== Extended plays ===
- Not Listening (1989)
- Flibbiddydibbiddydob (1990)
- Schminkie Minkie Pinkie (1998)
- Sweet Days (2000)
- Blue Gravy Phase 9 (2001)
- No Biting! (2016)
- The Wrath Of Thoth (2020)

=== Singles ===
- "1990 Tour Flexi" (7")
- "Cubical" (7")
- "That's Fine" (7"/CD)
- "100% Recyclable Punk" (7")
- "100% Recyclable Punk" (7") (limited edition of 25 with different sleeve for Japanese tour)
- "Christmas Single" (Theme from Whatever Happened to the Likely Lads? (7"))
- "Long Ball To No-One" (7"/CD)
- "Do Do Do EP" (7"/CD)
- "Gandara and Friends" (7"/CD)
- "Nick Motown" (7"/CD) ("Schminkie Minkie Pinkie" (US) (7"/CD))
- "Yuki" (7"/CD)
- "In The Fishtank" (CD)
- "Oishe Deh" (CD)
- "Australian Tour" (7"/CD)
- "Down By Yurr" (7"/CD)
- "What's In The Pasties" (CD)
- "Sweet Days" (7"/CD)
- "Blue Gravy" (2x7"/CD)
- "VS Urban Dub" (CD)
- "Blue Gravy Dub Versions" (CD)
- "Chocs Away" (CD)
- "Blue Gravy VS Urban Dub" (CD)
- "Innafayce" (CD)
- "A Lover's Concerto" (digital download)
- "5-4-3-2-1 Ding-a-Ling Yahon" (CD)
- "In the Stocks" (7"/digital download)
- "Green Glass Chippings" (studio live 7")

=== Videos ===
- High Octane Video Wounders (DVD/VHS)
