= Steve Hewitt =

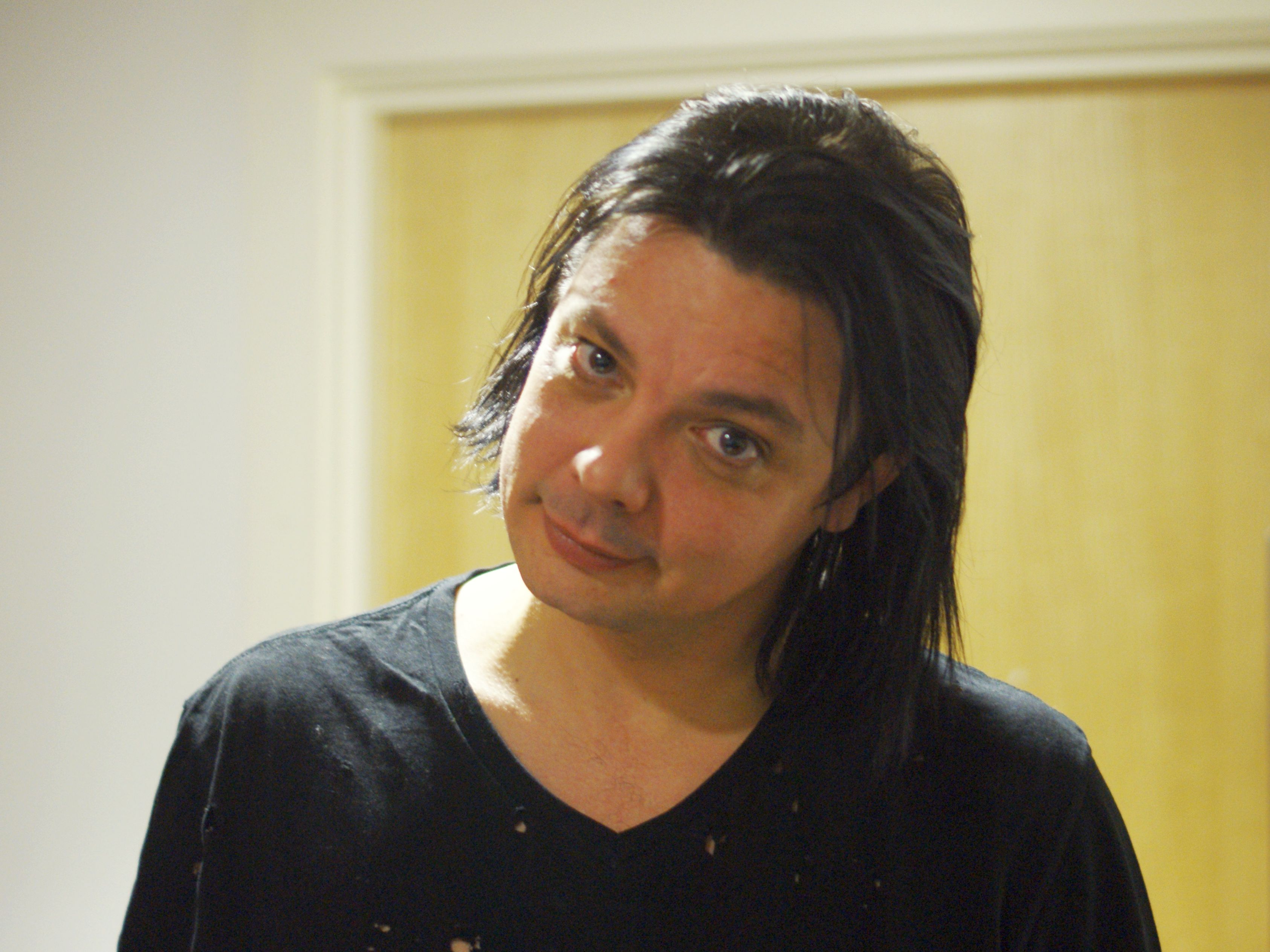
- Steve Hewitt backstage at Manchester Academy, February 2011

Background information
- Born: Steven James Hewitt; 22 March 1971 (age 55)
- Origin: Northwich, Cheshire, England, United Kingdom
- Genres: Alternative rock, indie rock, electronic rock, hard rock
- Occupations: Musician, singer-songwriter, record producer
- Instruments: Vocals, drums, percussion, guitar, bass, piano, keyboards
- Years active: 1988–present
- Labels: Action, Rough Trade, Hut, Virgin, Ancient B

Steven James Hewitt (born 22 March 1971) is an English musician, singer-songwriter and record producer. He is the frontman of his own band, Love Amongst Ruin. Hewitt is best known for his tenure as the drummer for Placebo between September 1996 and October 2007. He plays drums and guitar left-handed.

== Personal life and influences ==
Hewitt was born in Northwich, Cheshire, England and attended Weaverham High School. Hewitt has a daughter and had a second child in early 2010. His elder daughter Emily performed backing vocals on Love Song, the final track on Love Amongst Ruin's 2010 debut album.

Hewitt was inspired to become a drummer after watching Phil Taylor performing "Ace of Spades" with Motörhead on Top of the Pops. He "hassled" his parents to get him a drum kit and when they did, he taught himself to play. Hewitt also acknowledges drummers Phil Rudd (AC/DC) and John Bonham (Led Zeppelin) as influences. Hewitt was musically active at school, drumming and putting on performances. He lists some of his influences as The Cure, Depeche Mode, The Smiths, AC/DC, Black Sabbath, Thin Lizzy, Led Zeppelin, Jimi Hendrix, Radiohead and Can. He recalled that his family "loved music" and driving on caravan holidays in the car would be punctuated by the sounds of Bee Gees, Elton John, ELO and The Beatles.

Hewitt worked as a picture framer before leaving school and upon leaving school he began training to be a race car engineer. He progressed to be offered an opportunity to continue his training with Williams and worked on the team's pit crew. He also worked as a sign writer until deciding to pursue music full-time.

== Drumming career ==
=== Early years (1988–1996) ===
Hewitt began his career in the North West of England, playing with his brother Nick in Misadventure, before leaving in 1988 to join The Mystic Deckchairs. Two of The Mystic Deckchairs' tracks, "For The Day" and "Keep Your Head On", appeared on the 1989 compilation LP Drunk released by Emergency Records. Hewitt joined fellow local musician Tim Burgess in Electric Crayons, prior to Burgess joining The Charlatans in 1989. Hewitt also joined Breed at the age of 17 and linked up with the band for a German tour after spying an advert placed by the band in Affleck's Palace. Following the completion of the tour, Hewitt joined The Boo Radleys on a temporary basis and played on the band's 1990 debut album, Ichabod and I. Hewitt rejoined Breed in 1991 and played on the albums Grin in 1991 and Violet Sentimental in 1993. Despite a support slot on Nick Cave's Let Love In tour, Breed found commercial success elusive and following a disastrous gig at the Bull & Gate in London in 1996, the band split. While in Breed, Hewitt also played for house act K-Klass. The need for money during these years saw Hewitt take on session work in London, recording jingles and appearing on releases by Baby June and Sharkboy. On 6 December 2004, Breed reformed for a one-off gig at Lock 17 in Camden Lock Market, London.

=== Placebo (1996–2007) ===
Hewitt met Brian Molko in 1991 through his then-girlfriend and was invited to drum on demos for Molko's band Placebo, though Hewitt was unable to join the band due to his commitments to Breed. The band earned a record deal with drummer Robert Schultzberg, who played on the trio's 1996 debut album. In the autumn of 1996, tensions between Schultzberg, Molko and bassist Stefan Olsdal led to Schultzberg's departure from the band. Breed's breakup around the same time allowed Hewitt to accept the invitation to join Placebo permanently. Hewitt appeared in the video for the band's 1997 "Nancy Boy" single with his face blurred out, because he was still under contract to a different record label. After completing touring for Placebo, the band wrote and recorded their second album, Without You I'm Nothing, released in October 1998. The first official Placebo release to feature Hewitt was the "Pure Morning" single, released in August 1998. Hewitt drummed and contributed to the songwriting on subsequent albums Black Market Music (2000), Sleeping with Ghosts (2003) and Meds (2006) with the band. On 1 October 2007, after the completion of the tour supporting Meds, it was announced via the official Placebo website that Hewitt had parted company with Placebo due to "personal and musical differences". He was replaced in 2008 by Steve Forrest, the band's first right-handed drummer.

=== Love Amongst Ruin (2007–present) ===
Feeling "betrayed" after leaving Placebo and faced with a decision "to go to the pub or the studio", Hewitt returned to his home studio and began creating "a new band, a new album and a new sound". He contributed drums, guitars, piano and lead vocals to the album and enlisted Jon Thorne and Donald Ross Skinner as collaborators. Steve's brother Nick Hewitt recorded additional guitars and Hewitt felt that he had captured his best ever drum sound on the album. The band was named Love Amongst Ruin in late 2009 and Hewitt assuming frontman duties. The band's debut gig at the Eurosonic Festival in the Netherlands on 14 January 2010 was his first public appearance since leaving Placebo. Love Amongst Ruin's self-titled debut album was released on 13 September 2010 and was supported by UK and European tours through 2010 and 2011. Hewitt wrote and recorded the band's second album Lose Your Way with Donald Ross Skinner in 2011 and 2012, but the album was withheld from release until 27 June 2015. The album was supported by a short European tour.

=== Six by Seven (2012–2013) ===
Hewitt befriended members of the band Six by Seven when they toured as opening act for Placebo in 1998. In 2012, Hewitt and Six by Seven frontman Chris Olley were reintroduced by mutual friend Steve Hove (a then-guitarist for Love Amongst Ruin) and began rehearsing new material for Olley's project (The Death of) Six By Seven. The material they wrote eventually saw the project morph into a reformed Six by Seven. Hewitt was announced as the band's new drummer in August 2012. The band entered Moles Studio in Bath in January 2013 to record the band's seventh album. The album, titled Love and Peace and Sympathy, was released on 16 April 2013 and the band embarked on a UK tour in mid-2013, which included a slot at Glastonbury Festival. Hewitt's year was ended by a broken arm suffered in October 2013, which caused him to miss an in-store signing at Fopp in Nottingham and a performance at Soundedit Festival. Chris Olley reported on his blog in May 2014 that he had recorded a new Six by Seven album by himself, which hinted that Hewitt had left the band.

=== Republica (2024–present) ===
In June 2024, Saffron announced that Hewitt had joined Republica as the band's live drummer.

== Collaborations and production career ==
=== Lys ===
Hewitt struck up a friendship with French band Lys while touring to support Love Amongst Ruin in 2011. As executive producer, Hewitt and Paul Corkett oversaw the production of six songs on Lys' 2013 debut album Go Your Own Way. He worked on Lys' 2015 second album Rebud in 2015 and has been regular guest at the band's live shows.

=== Other projects ===
In 2010, Hewitt joined songwriter/producer Brandun Reed as a collaborator on Reed's Polaroid Kiss project and played on the albums The New Coliseum (2013) and Youth (2015). In 2013, he produced the entirety of Italian band Spiral 69's third album Ghosts in My Eyes. As of May 2015, Hewitt was recording and producing pop singer DéDé and recording drums for Paul Draper's Spooky Action. From 2019 onwards, he collaborated with and played live drums for Evi Vine. In June 2019, Hewitt played drums for Golden Apes at Wave-Gotik-Treffen. In July 2022, Hewitt joined Georgia Train's live band. In 2023, he began playing live drums for Brighton-based rock band Iamwarface.

== Discography ==
=== Albums ===
with Baby June

- Need to Need You (1993)

with Boo Radleys

- Ichabod and I (1990)

with Breed

- Grin (1991)
- Violent Sentimental (1993)

with Love Amongst Ruin

- Love Amongst Ruin (2010)
- Lose Your Way (2015)

with Placebo

- Without You I'm Nothing (1998)
- Black Market Music (2000)
- Sleeping with Ghosts (2003)
- Meds (2006)

with Polaroid Kiss

- The New Coliseum (Expanded Compilation) (2013)
- Youth (2015)

with Six By Seven

- Love and Peace and Sympathy (2013)

=== EPs ===
- Breed – Clawfist – The Peel Sessions (split with Gallon Drunk) (1992)
- Love Amongst Ruin – Home (2010)
- Polaroid Kiss – The New Coliseum (2011)

=== Collaborations ===
- Sharkboy – The Valentine Tapes (LP, 1995); drums on "Same Mother of Pearl"
- Sharkboy – The Valentine Singles (4-part single set, 1995); 8 tracks

=== Producer ===
- Lys – Go Your Own Way (2013, album, with Paul Corkett); 7 tracks
- Lys – Redbud (2015, album, with Paul Corkett)
- Spiral 69 – Ghosts in My Eyes (2013, album, with Paul Corkett)
