= Electrasy =

English rock band

- Origin: Dorset, England
- Genres: Alternative rock, Britpop
- Years active: 1994–2002, 2021—present
- Labels: MCA, Arista, Pink Hedgehog, CD Baby
- Members: Steve Atkins; Jim Hayden; Ali McKinnell; Alex Meadows; Nigel Nisbet; Chris Page
- Past members: Paul Pridmore

Electrasy are an English rock band. Formed in 1994 in Dorset, England, the band consists of vocalist Alisdair (Ali) McKinnell, guitarists Nigel Nisbet and Steve Atkins, bassist Alex Meadows (who joined the band before they recorded In Here We Fall), drummer Paul Pridmore and keyboardist Jim Hayden (who left the band by May 2001 and rejoined in 2022). The band were active until 2002, although several members of the band still based in the UK after this time continued to perform occasional gigs. Nigel Nisbet has subsequently released four solo albums, Calling All the Dreamers in 2007, Musicians Are Different in 2015, Mainstream Panic in 2016 and Falling from the Stars in 2018. Alex Meadows has also released recent solo material under the name the Inexperienced, and is also a regular performer with various other acts (Tom Jones, Il Divo). Electrasy released a new album on 1 July 2021, entitled Givin' It Back, including multiple remasters and a live recording of their 1998 single "Best Friend's Girl".

A fourth album, To the Other Side, was recorded in 2022 and released in the summer of 2023. The album release was accompanied by two gigs in the UK, in Cheltenham and at the 100 Club in London. In July 2024, the band completed a more extensive ten-date tour throughout the southern United Kingdom.

Calling All the Dreamers, a book written by Pete Trainor, was released in June 2023 and chronicles the band's career, the major changes in the music industry during Electrasy's time in it, and the impact of those changes on the band and music in general.

A fifth studio album titled Out There was released on 16 June 2025 featuring a re-recording of the Titan A.E. film soundtrack song "Cosmic Castaway".

== Career ==
Electrasy (originally named Crush and then Vivid from 1994 to 1996) achieved UK Singles Chart success with "Morning Afterglow" (reached number 19 and later number 49 on the US Rock charts in 2000), and released two major label albums, 1998's Beautiful Insane in the UK and 2000's In Here We Fall in the US. "Morning Afterglow" was on both albums and a new version of "Angel" was recorded for In Here We Fall. Recording began for their third album, Wired for Dreaming, in 2001, but because of trouble with their record labels – first MCA/Universal UK and then Arista in the U.S. – delayed release of the third album, until it was finally released on physical format in 2008 with the help of Pink Hedgehog Records.

During their career, Electrasy played over 180 shows in 1998, including two live performances on Channel4 TFI Friday and appearing on the Other Stage at the Glastonbury Festival in 1999. The band were also voted #2 NEW ARTIST OF 1999 by WBRU's listeners, and in the Top Songs Of 99 chart, "Morning Afterglow" came in at #7, and "Best Friend's Girl" came at #63.

In Here We Fall features a cover of the Led Zeppelin song "Dazed and Confused". The song "Cosmic Castaway", from the same album, was also featured on the soundtrack album of the 2000 animated film Titan A.E. and has been streamed over 3 million times. In addition, their song "Renegades" can be heard in the final scene and credits of the 2001 film Monkeybone.

In 2013, the band released a previously unreleased version of the song "Today's the Day" for Pink Hedgehog Records' compilation album Close to the Hedge, featuring various artists. This version of the song was originally recorded in 1997 as part of the pre-production for the album Beautiful Insane.

According to The Guinness Book of Records, Electrasy won an award for having 4,400 custard pies thrown in three minutes featuring members of the official Laurel and Hardy fan club, which was also part of the music video to their single "Best Friend's Girl".

== Discography ==
=== Albums ===
| Year | Album | UK chart position |
|---|---|---|
| 1998 | Beautiful Insane: Released: 17 September 1998; Format: CD | 41 |
| 2000 | In Here We Fall: Released: 26 September 2000; Format: CD | — |
| 2008 | Wired for Dreaming: Released: 2007 (recorded in 2001); Format: CD | — |
| 2021 | Givin' It Back: Various unreleased demos & studio recordings; Released: 2021; Format: Digital | — |
| 2023 | To the Other Side: Released: 15 July 2023; Format: Digital | — |

=== Singles ===
| Year | Information | UK chart position | Album |
|---|---|---|---|
| 1998 | "Lost in Space": Released: 1 June 1998; Format: CD, cassette, 7" | 60 | Beautiful Insane |
| 1998 | "Morning Afterglow": Released: 24 August 1998; Format: 2 x CD, cassette | 19 | Beautiful Insane |
| 1998 | "Best Friend's Girl": Released: 16 November 1998; Format: 2 x CD | 41 | Beautiful Insane |
| 2008 | "Roll It Up": Released: 7 July 2008; Format: Digital download | — | Wired for Dreaming |
| 2023 | "Chemical Angel (Radio Session)": Released: 11 April 2023; Format: Digital download | — | |
| 2023 | "A Million Pictures": Released: 1 May 2023; Format: Digital download | — | To the Other Side |
| 2023 | "Easing My Soul": Released: 1 June 2023; Format: Digital download | — | To the Other Side |
| 2023 | "I Tried" (featuring Julia Violinista): Released: 1 July 2023; Format: Digital download | — | To the Other Side |
