= Six by Seven =

English indie rock band

Six By Seven
- Also known as: "Friends Of...", SIX.BY SEVEN, six.by seven, six.byseven
- Origin: Nottingham, England
- Genres: Indie rock, space rock, shoegaze, neo-psychedelia
- Years active: 1992–2008, 2012–present
- Labels: Mantra, Beggars Banquet, Saturday Night Sunday Morning
- Members: Chris Olley; Charlie Olley; Chris Davis
- Past members: Doggen; Paul Douglas; Sam Hempton; James Flower; Pete Stevenson; Martin Cooper; Steve Hewitt

Six by Seven (also written as SIX.BY SEVEN or six.by seven or six.byseven) are an English indie rock band, formed in 1992 in Nottingham. The classic lineup of the band featured singer/guitarist Chris Olley, guitarist Sam Hempton, drummer Chris Davis, bassist Paul Douglas and keyboard player James Flower.

The band split up in 2008, before re-forming in 2012 with Olley and Flower as the only original members.

== Formation ==
Originally formed in 1992 as "Friends Of...", they performed their first show at the Old Angel pub in their hometown of Nottingham in late 1992. Bass player Paul Douglas joined later that year.

The band got their break by playing support slots with Rocket from the Crypt and Girls Against Boys, and changed their name to Six by Seven in 1996. The name was taken from the research connected with the Hubble Space Telescope.

== Early releases ==
In 1997 the band released their debut 12-inch single 'European Me', which led to a five-album deal. Their debut album, The Things We Make, was released the following year, after which they began headlining their own shows, as well as touring with Ash, Manic Street Preachers, The Dandy Warhols, and Placebo. In May 1998, they were asked to play a live session on the John Peel Show, and recorded four more sessions over the next four years.

Their second album, The Closer You Get, was released in 2000. Sam Hempton left the band shortly thereafter. Douglas followed in 2002, after the release of their third album, The Way I Feel Today. In September 2004 the fourth album 04 was released, along with a collection of outtakes from the recording sessions called Left Luggage at the Peveril Hotel which was initially available through the band's website. In April 2005 a new album was announced for release entitled Artists Cannibals Poets Thieves – it was described as Six by Seven's "first album as a three-piece".

== Disbanding ==
Shortly before the album's release in June, the band announced they were to "stop touring and effectively end the group for the foreseeable future", with a live album and a b-sides and rarities collection to follow.

In December 2005 a new "unofficial" studio album – Club Sandwich at the Peveril Hotel – was released on the band's web site on 16 January 2006, with a limited number of copies making their way into stores in March. Although there was mention (and even scheduling) of a series of live gigs for early 2006, these shows were eventually cancelled.

In August 2006 the band made a surprise appearance playing at The Social in Nottingham with a new line-up featuring past collaborators Tony Doggen Foster and Ady Fletcher with Ian Bissett newly recruited on the drums.

In September 2006 a collection of rarities, live tracks and demo recordings was made available via the bands' website.

On 12 December 2006 the band played another gig at The Social in Nottingham. Once again this featured the lineup of Chris Olley, James Flower, Doggen, Ady Fletcher and Ian Bissett.

== Side projects ==
Chris Olley continues to work on solo project Twelve but has laid electro clash outfit Fuck Me USA to rest. He released his first solo album in November 2009 and has released several more since, mostly via his website.

Chris Davis formed Spotlight Kid as a side project with Nottingham-based singer Katty Heath in 2004. When Six by Seven broke up in 2005 Chris decided to carry on full-time with Spotlight Kid. The second album featured Chris (as ringleader, chief songwriter and stickman) and a full band, along with Katty continuing on vocal duties.

== Reformation ==
In February 2007, it was officially announced via the band's website that Six by Seven had re-formed with their original lineup of Chris Olley, Sam Hempton, James Flower and Christian Davis. Pete Stevenson takes over Paul Douglas' role on bass.

July 2007 saw the online release of a new album recorded solely by Olley and Flower. It was entitled If Symptoms Persist, Kill Your Doctor and was limited to 1000 copies only. Its lyrics are inspired by an episode of a BBC TV programme called The Trap. Gigs were scheduled to coincide with the release.

A best of (with songs chosen by fans on the official forum) was released later including remixes and a DVD containing the band's promo videos.

The band finally imploded after Chris Olley left in November 2008.

In August 2012, Chris Olley announced that he and James Flower re-formed Six by Seven and that they were recording new material with the former Placebo drummer Steve Hewitt. A new album, Love And Peace And Sympathy, was released on 8 July 2013.

Following a Facebook campaign to get Eat Junk Become Junk to number one another re-formation happened. After the song went to number one in the Christmas 2015 Rock Download Chart, Beggars Banquet re-released the band's second album on vinyl, including a bonus album of B-sides and Peel Sessions. A Greatest Hits CD was also released. Following this the band did two one-off shows with the original line-up at the Maze In Nottingham and The Garage in London. At the Maze show in Nottingham the band played The Closer You Get album in its entirety.

With another six by seven show planned in October 2017, Chris Olley intends to re-form and restructure the band as a going live concern once again. The band played the Glade stage at Glastonbury Festival in 2019.

== Discography ==
=== Studio albums ===
- The Things We Make (1998)
- European Me (EP, 1998)
- Two and a Half Days in Love with You (EP, 1999)
- The Closer You Get (2000)
- The Way I Feel Today (2002) UK #69
- 04 (2004)
- Artists Cannibals Poets Thieves (2005)
- Club Sandwich at the Peveril Hotel (2006)
- If Symptoms Persist, Kill Your Doctor (2007)
- Love and Peace and Sympathy (2013)
- six by seven I - also known as Blood Drips Album (2015)
- six by seven II - also known as Hollywood Splatter Album (2016)
- EXII (2017)
- The World Hates Me and the Feeling Is Mutual (2019)

=== Compilations ===
- Left Luggage at the Peveril Hotel (2004)
- Any Colour So Long as It's Black (All the Way from Forest Fields and Back...) (2008)
- Greatest Hits (2016)

=== Singles and EPs ===
- "European Me" (1997)
- "88-92-96" (1997)
- "Candlelight" (1998) UK #70
- "For You" (1998) UK #87
- "Ten Places to Die" (1999)
- "New Year" (2000)
- "Eat Junk Become Junk" (2000)
- "So Close" (2002)
- "I O U Love" (2002) UK #48
- "All My New Best Friends" (2002)
- "Bochum (Light Up My Life)" (2003)
- "Bring Down the Government" (2003)
- "Ready for You Now" (2004)
- "Catch the Rain" (2004)
- "Ocean/Clouds" (2004)

=== Live, demo, or unofficial albums ===
- B-Sides & Rarities 1
- B-Sides & Rarities 2
- Live in Ashton-Under-Lyne 08/09/99
- Live in Usa, Oslo, Newcastle
- Live in Amsterdam/Paris
- Live at La Route Du Rock 1998
- Live at Eden project 11 August 2001
- Live at Manchester Hop and Grape 15-04-02
- Live at Nottingham Boatclub 31/10/02
- Live Sessions 1999-2001
- Alternative Versions, Remixes and Cover Versions
- Demo's 1997-99
- Live at the Peveril Hotel
- Demos Volume II
- Live at Glastonbury 2008
