= Jon Thorne =

English double bassist

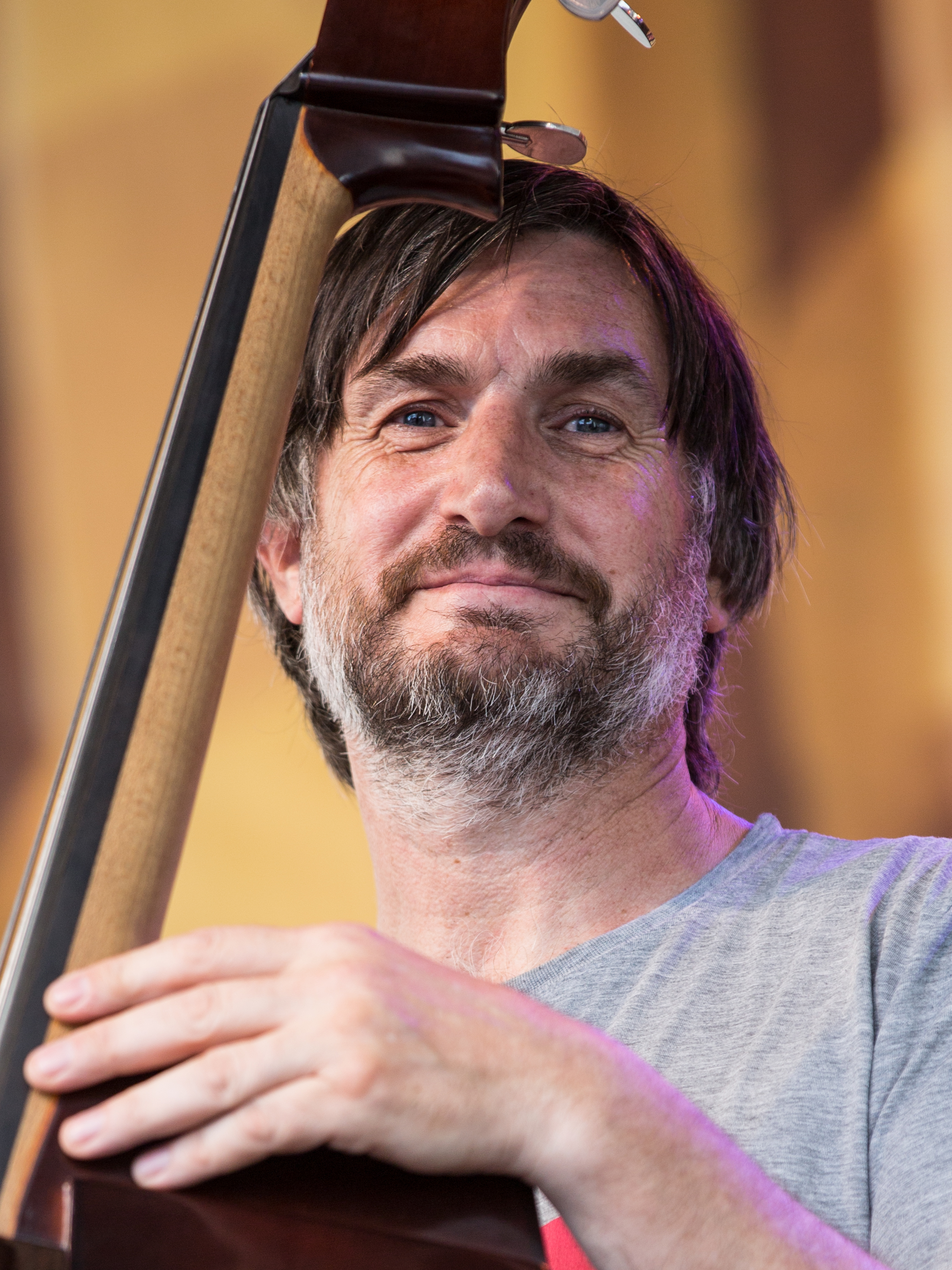
Jon Thorne at the Rudolstadt-Festival 2017

Jon Thorne (born 12 February 1967) is an English double bassist, producer and composer.

== Career ==
His debut album Manchester Road was released through SAM LTD/ EGEA records in 2006 featured 12 original compositions of jazz with pianist Steve Brown and drummer Luke Flowers.

Jon also plays double bass in the band Kiiōtō, including on their debut album As Dust We Rise.

== Selected discography ==
=== Solo ===
- Homestead - album 2020
- Watching the Well - album 2010
- Manchester Road (as Jon Thorne's Oedipus Complex) - album 2006

=== With Yorkston/Thorne/Khan ===
- Navarasa: Nine Emotions - album 2020
- Neuk Wight Delhi All-Stars - album 2017
- Everything Sacred - album 2016

=== With Lamb ===
- Backspace_Unwind - album 2014
- 5 - album 2011
- Live at Koko - album 2011
- Remixed - album 2005
- Best Kept Secrets - album and DVD 2004
- Between Darkness and Wonder - album 2003
- Fear of Fours - album 1998
- Lamb - album 1996

=== Other collaborations ===
- Wildfires, Polly Paulusma - album 2025
- Humm, Malojain - album 2020
- Let Your Weirdness Carry You Home, Malojian - album 2017
- Hypoxia, Kathryn Williams - album 2015
- Salvor, Falselights - album 2015
- Charms Against Sorrow, Hannah Sanders - album 2015
- The Sea, Martha Tilston - album 2014
- Definitely Now, Liam Bailey - album 2014
- The Cellardyke Recording And Wassailing Society, James Yorkston - album 2014
- Crown Electric, Kathryn Williams - album 2013
- Phonograph, Jesca Hoop - single 2013
- Great Lakes, John Smith - album 2013
- World Without Form, Nat Birchall - album 2013
- Machines of Love and Grace, Martha Tilston - album 2012
- I Was a Cat from a Book, James Yorkston - album 2012
- As the Sun Comes Up, Jay Leighton - album 2011
- Thirteen, Robert Miles - album 2011
- Snowglobe, Jesca Hoop - album 2011
- Oh My Days, The Memory Band - album 2011
- Lucy and the Wolves, Martha Tilston - album 2010
- One Good Thing, Lou Rhodes - album 2010
- Map or Direction, John Smith - album 2009
- Folk Songs, James Yorkston - The Analogue Catalogue Sessions, CD/DVD 2009
- Ninja Tuna, Mr Scruff - 2008
- Hairy Bumpercress, Mr Scruff - 12" 2008
- Bloom, Lou Rhodes - album 2007
- Migrating Bird, The Songs of Lal Waterson - Various (with James Yorkston) - album 2007
- Cortina Deluxx - Debut EP 10" vinyl 2006
- Of Milkmaids and Architects, Martha Tilston - album 2006
- Beloved One, Lou Rhodes - album (as composer) 2006
- Miles/Gurtu, Robert Miles/Trilok Gurtu - album 2004
- Back to Mine LP, MJ Cole - album (with The John Ellis Big Bang) 2002
