= Spotlight Kid (band) =

English band

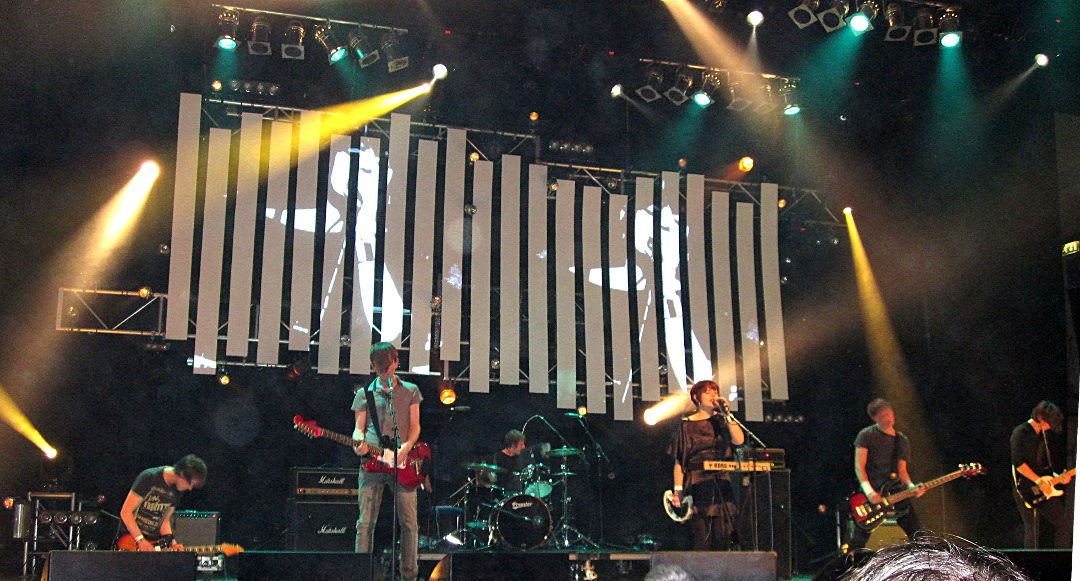
- Performing at the Summer Sundae festival, Leicester, August 2010

Background information
- Origin: Nottingham, England
- Genres: Shoegazing, dream pop, krautrock
- Years active: 2006–present
- Labels: Club AC30; Saint Marie
- Members: Chris Davis; Karl Skivington; Rob McCleary; Matt Holt; Katty Heath
- Past members: Richard Davidson; Marlek Alexander al-Habib; Chris Moore
- Website: http://www.spotlightkidsound.co.uk

Spotlight Kid were an English, Nottingham-based shoegaze band, whose original line-up was Six By Seven drummer Chris Davis on drums, Rob McCleary & Katty Heath (formerly of Bent) on vocals, Karl Skivington and Chris Moore on guitars and Matt Holt on bass.

The band takes its name from the 1972 album The Spotlight Kid by American musician, singer-songwriter and artist Captain Beefheart.

== History ==
Their first album, Departure, was released on Club AC30 in 2006.

In 2009, Spotlight Kid released Crystal Dreams, a four track EP, on Two & One Records. In 2010, they followed this with a limited edition 7" vinyl double A-side "April/All Is Real" on Club AC30.

The latest album, Disaster Tourist, was released in September 2011 in the UK, with an expanded release for the rest of the world in November 2012. It was recorded at Purple Studios in two days, each track played live in one take.

Live, Spotlight Kid have supported Jake Bugg and played at the 2011 Glastonbury Festival. Selected by a panel that included Zane Lowe, Steve Lamacq, Jo Whiley, Dom Gourlay Tom Robinson and Emily Eavis they appeared on the BBC introducing stage.

Spotlight Kid's music draws influences from the likes of The Steady Sound, Spacemen 3, Lush and Swervedriver. It features mixtures of shoegazing, Krautrock and 1990s psychedelic rock.

== Discography ==
- Departure (2006), Club AC30
- Crystal Dreams EP (2010)
- "April/All Is Real" limited edition 7" single (2010)
- Disaster Tourist (2011), Club AC30
- Ten Thousand Hours (2014)
