= Chris Olley =

- Origin: Nottingham, England
- Website: www.chrisolley.co.uk

Chris Olley is an English musician and photographer from Nottingham, who is best known as the lead singer, guitarist, and primary songwriter for the indie rock band Six By Seven. He has also released several albums under his own name and under the group name Twelve. He is also known for collaborating with Julian Cope in the studio and on tour. Olley's photography has been exhibited at art galleries in England.

== Discography ==
=== Twelve ===
- First Album (2003)
- Be Careful What You Don't Wish For (2006)
- 03 (2007)
- Houston We Have No Problem (2008)
- Houston We Have No Problem II – Raumschiff Schlaf Symphonie (2008)

=== Solo ===
- A Streetcar Named Disaster (2009)
- East of Edale (EP, 2010)
- Who's Afraid of Virginia Wade (EP, 2010)
- Six 8 Track Demo's (EP, 2010)
- The Grapes of Hyman Roth (EP, 2011)
- The Blackest Soul (EP, 2011)
- A Dog Is for Christmas (2011)
- The Adventures of Baron Munchausen by Proxy (compilation. 2011)
- Sign on You Crazy Diamond (2012)
- Crap on a Hot Tin Roof (box set, 2012)
