= The Cure discography =

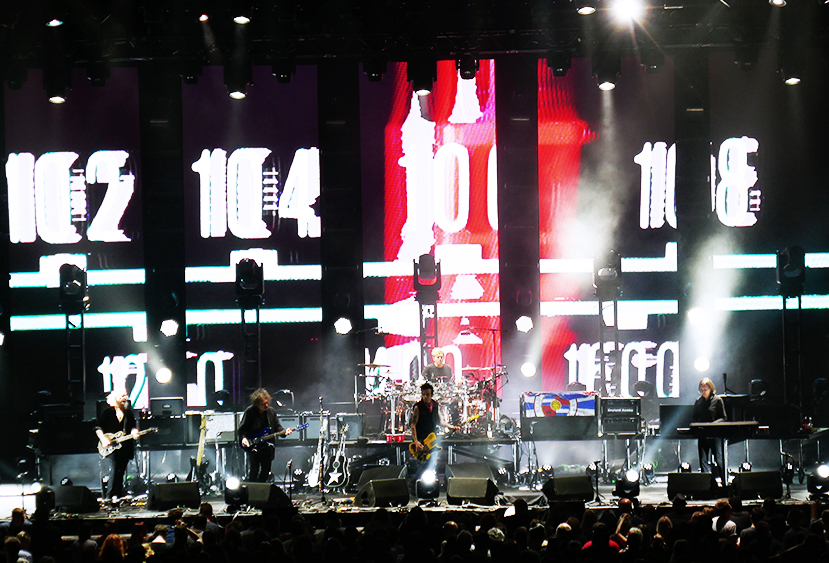
- The Cure performing live at Madison Square Garden in 2016
- Studio albums: 14
- Extended plays: 12
- Live albums: 7
- Compilation albums: 7
- Singles: 47
- Video albums: 13
- Music videos: 44
- Remix albums: 3
- Box sets: 8
- Other sets: 6
- Promotional singles: 20
- Other appearances: 12

The English rock band the Cure has released fourteen studio albums, seven live albums, three remix albums, seven compilation albums, eight box sets, twelve extended plays and forty-seven singles on Fiction Records and Geffen Records. They have also released twelve video albums and forty-four music videos.

Formed in 1976, the Cure grew out of a band known as Malice. Malice formed in January 1976 and underwent several line-up changes and a name change to Easy Cure before The Cure was founded in May 1978. The Cure's original line-up consisted of guitarist/vocalist Robert Smith, drummer Laurence "Lol" Tolhurst and bassist Michael Dempsey. The band has continued through various line-ups; Smith is the group's only remaining original member. The line-up as of June 2026 consisted of Smith, bassist Simon Gallup, keyboard player Roger O'Donnell, drummer Jason Cooper, guitarist Reeves Gabrels and multi instrumentalist Eden Gallup.

The Cure's debut album, Three Imaginary Boys (1979), reached number 44 on the UK Albums Chart. The next two albums, Seventeen Seconds (1980) and Faith (1981), were top 20 hits in the UK, reaching number 20 and number 14 respectively. Between 1982 and 1996, the Cure released seven studio albums, all of which reached the Top 10 in the UK. The most successful of these was Wish (1992) which reached number one in the UK and number two on the US Billboard 200. They released the next album Wild Mood Swings in 1996. The following three studio albums – Bloodflowers (2000), The Cure (2004) and 4:13 Dream (2008) – had mixed success, reaching numbers 14, 8 and 33 in the UK respectively. The group released their fourteenth album, Songs of a Lost World, in 2024, the group's first new album in sixteen years. It was their first album since Wish to reach number one in the UK, and was also one of the fastest selling albums of 2024, having at one point outsold the entire top 10 of the week combined.

== Albums ==
=== Studio albums ===
Title	Album details	Peak chart positions										Sales	Certifications
Title	Album details	UK	AUS	AUT	FRA	GER	NL	NZ	SWE	SWI	US	Sales	Certifications
Three Imaginary Boys	Released: 8 May 1979; Label: Fiction; Formats: LP, MC	44	—	—	140 (Note: Chart position for the 2004 deluxe edition.)	—	—	37	—	—	—	AUS: 30,000	BPI: Silver
Seventeen Seconds	Released: 18 April 1980; Label: Fiction; Formats: LP, MC	20	39	—	80 (Note: Chart position for the 2005 deluxe edition.)	—	15	9	—	—	186 (Note: Chart position for the 40th anniversary release in 2020.)		BPI: Silver
Faith	Released: 17 April 1981; Label: Fiction; Formats: LP, MC	14	38	—	84	—	9	1	38	—	193 (Note: Chart position for the 40th anniversary release in 2021.)		BPI: Silver
Pornography	Released: 3 May 1982; Label: Fiction, A&M; Formats: LP, MC	8	39	—	81	—	17	9	45	—	133 (Note: Chart position for the 40th anniversary release in 2022.)		BPI: Silver
The Top	Released: 4 May 1984; Label: Fiction, Sire; Formats: CD, LP, MC	10	55	—	18	44	12	23	31	—	180		BPI: Silver
The Head on the Door	Released: 30 August 1985; Label: Fiction, Elektra; Formats: CD, LP, MC	7	6	—	6	15	3	11	24	14	59		BPI: Gold; RIAA: Gold; RMNZ: Gold
Kiss Me, Kiss Me, Kiss Me	Released: 26 May 1987; Label: Fiction, Elektra; Formats: CD, 2×LP, MC	6	9	4	2	4	3	14	13	3	35		BPI: Gold; RIAA: Platinum; RMNZ: Gold
Disintegration	Released: 2 May 1989; Label: Fiction, Elektra; Formats: CD, 2×LP, MC	3	9	5	3	2	3	6	10	4	12		BPI: Gold; BVMI: Gold; IFPI SWI: Gold; RIAA: 2× Platinum; RMNZ: Platinum
Wish	Released: 21 April 1992; Label: Fiction, Elektra; Formats: CD, 2×LP, MC	1	1	14	17	4	22	3	10	5	2		BPI: Gold; ARIA: Platinum; IFPI SWI: Gold; RIAA: Platinum; RMNZ: Gold
Wild Mood Swings	Released: 7 May 1996; Label: Fiction, Elektra; Formats: CD, 2×LP, MC	9	5	12	27	17	37	10	2	9	12		RIAA: Gold
Bloodflowers	Released: 2 February 2000; Label: Fiction/Polydor, Elektra; Formats: CD, 2×LP, MC	14	11	22	3	5	50	41	5	3	16	US: 285,000	IFPI SWI: Gold
The Cure	Released: 25 June 2004; Label: I Am/Geffen; Formats: CD, CD+DVD, 2×LP	8	28	12	4	3	37	32	10	5	7	US: 91,000	BPI: Silver
4:13 Dream	Released: 27 October 2008; Label: Suretone/Geffen; Formats: CD, 2×LP	33	30	28	8	21	38	32	36	15	16	US: 97,000	
Songs of a Lost World	Released: 1 November 2024; Label: Fiction/Polydor, Capitol; Formats: CD, CD+BD, LP, MC	1	5	1	1	1	1	3	1	1	4		BPI: Gold; SNEP: Gold
"—" denotes releases that did not chart or were not released in that territory.

=== Live albums ===
Title	Album details	Peak chart positions									Sales	Certifications
Title	Album details	UK	AUS	AUT	GER	NL	NZ	SWE	SWI	US	Sales	Certifications
Concert: The Cure Live	Released: 26 October 1984; Label: Fiction; Formats: LP, MC	26	86	—	—	31	37	—	—	—		
Entreat	Released: 25 March 1991 (commercially); Label: Fiction; Formats: CD, LP, MC	10	25	19	15	88	8	—	31	—		
Show	Released: 13 September 1993; Label: Fiction/Polydor, Elektra; Formats: 2×CD, CD, 2×LP, MC	29	16	16	17	71	36	34	37	42	US: 213,000	BPI: Silver
Paris	Released: 25 October 1993; Label: Fiction/Polydor, Elektra; Formats: CD, 2×LP, MC	56	72	—	11	—	—	—	20	118	US: 95,000	
Bestival Live 2011	Released: 2 December 2011; Label: Sunday Best; Formats: 2×CD, digital download	119	—	—	79	98	—	—	94	—		
40 Live (Curætion-25 + Anniversary) (Note: Released on streaming services under the title Anniversary: 1978 - 2018 Live In Hyde Park London)	Released: 18 October 2019; Label: Eagle Vision/Universal Music Group; Formats: 2×DVD, 2×Blu-ray, 2×DVD+4×CD, 2×Blu-ray+4×CD, digital download	—	—	—	2	33	—	—	14	—		
Songs of a Live World – Troxy London MMXIV	Released: 13 December 2024; Label: Fiction/Polydor; Formats: CD, LP, cassette, digital download	—	—	—	—	87	—	—	—	—		
"—" denotes releases that did not chart or were not released in that territory.

=== Remix albums ===
Title	Album details	Peak chart positions										Certifications
Title	Album details	UK	AUS	AUT	FRA	GER	NL	NZ	SWE	SWI	US	Certifications
Mixed Up	Released: 5 November 1990; Label: Fiction, Elektra; Formats: CD, 2×LP, MC	8	12	24	7	18	51	16	31	26	14	BPI: Gold; ARIA: Gold; RIAA: Platinum
Torn Down: Mixed Up Extras 2018	Released: 21 April 2018; Label: Fiction, Elektra; Formats: 2×LP	—	—	—	—	—	135	—	—	—	—	
Mixes of a Lost World	Released: 13 June 2025; Label: Fiction, Polydor; Formats: 2×LP, 2×CD, digital	9	—	9	29	5	21	—	—	4	—	
"—" denotes releases that did not chart or were not released in that territory.

=== Compilation albums ===
Title	Album details	Peak chart positions										Sales	Certifications
Title	Album details	UK	AUS	AUT	FRA	GER	NL	NZ	SWE	SWI	US	Sales	Certifications
Boys Don't Cry	Released: 5 February 1980; Label: PVC, Fiction; Formats: LP, MC	71 (Note: Chart position in 1983.)	60	—	—	—	—	25	—	—	—		BPI: Platinum
Japanese Whispers	Released: 16 December 1983; Label: Fiction, Sire; Formats: LP, MC	26	18	—	18	46	—	8	—	—	181		BPI: Silver
Standing on a Beach: The Singles (a.k.a. Staring at the Sea: The Singles)	Released: 15 May 1986; Label: Fiction, Elektra; Formats: CD, LP, MC	4	13	—	5	11	6	3	27	11	48	WW: 4,000,000	BPI: Gold; ARIA: 3× Platinum; BVMI: Gold; IFPI SWI: Gold; NVPI: Gold; RIAA: 2× Platinum; RMNZ: Platinum
Galore: The Singles 1987–1997	Released: 28 October 1997; Label: Fiction, Elektra; Formats: CD, LP, MC	37	45	—	—	51	81	31	54	—	32		BPI: Silver; ARIA: Gold; RIAA: Gold
Greatest Hits	Released: 7 November 2001; Label: Fiction/Polydor, Elektra; Formats: CD, 2×CD, MC	19	27	34	9	22	—	17	48	24	58		BPI: 4× Platinum; ARIA: 2× Platinum
Alternative Rarities 1988–1989	Released: 15 May 2010; Label: Self-released; Formats: digital download; Limited release	—	—	—	—	—	—	—	—	—	—		
Acoustic Hits	Released: 22 April 2017; Label: Fiction, Elektra; Formats: 2×LP; Originally released in 2001 as the second CD with Greatest Hits	—	—	—	—	—	110	—	—	—	—		
"—" denotes releases that did not chart or were not released in that territory.

== Box sets ==
Title	Album details	Peak chart positions			
Title	Album details	UK	FRA	ITA	US
First Aid Box	Released: 1987; Label: Elektra; Formats: 2×LP+MC+CD+2×12"+CS; US-only limited promo release	—	—	—	—
Integration	Released: 1990; Label: Elektra; Formats: 4×CDS; US-only limited release	—	—	—	—
Assemblage CD Collection	Released: 19 August 1991; Label: Fiction; Formats: 12×CD; France-only limited release	—	—	—	—
Limited Edition CD Box	Released: 2 November 1992; Label: Fiction; Formats: 15×CD; Limited release	—	—	—	—
Join the Dots: B-Sides & Rarities 1978–2001 (The Fiction Years)	Released: 26 January 2004; Label: Fiction/Polydor/Universal; Formats: 4×CD	98	29	50	106
Into the Dark: The Early Cure (1979–1982)	Released: August 2009; Label: Lilith; Formats: 4×LP; Russia-only limited release	—	—	—	—
Fade Away: The Early Years Vinyl Box Set	Released: 15 December 2009; Label: Vinyl Lovers/Lilith; Formats: 6×LP; Russia-only limited release	—	—	—	—
Classic Album Selection (1979–1984)	Released: 5 December 2011; Label: Fiction/Polydor/Universal; Formats: 5×CD	—	—	—	—
"—" denotes releases that did not chart or were not released in that territory.

=== Other sets ===
Title	Album details
...Happily Ever After	Released: 8 September 1981; Label: A&M; Formats: 2×LP, MC; US-only repackaging of Seventeen Seconds and Faith
The Head on the Door & Wish	Released: 1996; Label: Fiction; Formats: 2×CD; Australia-only release
3 for One	Released: 2000; Label: WEA; Formats: 3×CD; Australia-only repackaging of Faith, Pornography and The Top
Three Imaginary Boys / Faith	Released: 2008; Label: Geffen/Universal; Formats: 2×CD; France-only release
Pornography / Seventeen Seconds	Released: 2008; Label: Geffen/Universal; Formats: 2×CD; France-only release
The Head on the Door / Kiss Me Kiss Me Kiss Me	Released: 2008; Label: Geffen/Universal; Formats: 2×CD; France-only release

== Extended plays ==
Title	EP details	Peak chart positions			
Title	EP details	UK Indie	AUS	FRA	SPA
Singles	Released: 1982; Label: Stunn; Formats: 12"; Australasia-only release	—	—	—	—
A Single	Released: 12 July 1982; Label: Fiction; Formats: 2×7", 10"	—	—	—	—
The Walk	Released: August 1983; Label: Sire; Formats: 12", LP, MC; Mini-album released in North America and several other countries	—	—	—	—
Half an Octopuss & Quadpus	Released: 27 September 1985, 26 March 1986; Label: Fiction, Elektra; Formats: 10", 12"	—	—	—	—
The Cure	Released: 1988; Label: Amiga; Formats: 7"; East Germany-only release	—	—	—	—
The Peel Sessions	Released: May 1988; Label: Strange Fruit; Formats: 12", CDS, CS	7	—	—	—
Sideshow	Released: 14 September 1993; Label: Elektra; Formats: CDS; US and Australia-only release	—	63	—	—
Lost Wishes	Released: November 1994; Label: Fiction; Formats: CS; Limited release	—	—	—	—
Five Swing Live	Released: June 1997; Label: Fiction; Formats: CDS; Limited release	—	—	—	—
Sessions@AOL	Released: 27 July 2004; Label: Geffen; Formats: digital download	—	—	—	—
From Festival 2005	Released: 26 December 2006; Label: Geffen; Formats: digital download	—	—	—	—
Hypnagogic States	Released: 13 September 2008; Label: Geffen; Formats: CDS, digital download	—	—	39	1
Boys Don’t Cry (86 Mix)	Released: 2026; Label: Fiction; Formats: CDS, digital download	—	—	—	—
"—" denotes releases that did not chart or were not released in that territory.

== Singles ==
Title	Year	Peak chart positions										Certifications	Album
Title	Year	UK	AUS	FRA	GER	IRE	NL	NZ	SPA	US	US Dance	Certifications	Album
"Killing an Arab"	1978	—	—	—	—	—	—	—	—	—	—		Non-album single (Note: "Killing an Arab", "Boys Don't Cry" and "Jumping Someone Else's Train" were later included on Boys Don't Cry.)
"10:15 Saturday Night" (Note: "10:15 Saturday Night" was only released as a single in France.)	1979	—	—	—	—	—	—	—	—	—	—		Three Imaginary Boys
"Boys Don't Cry"	1979	22 (Note: The original version of "Boys Don't Cry" charted for the first time in January 2026.)	99	—	—	48 (Note: The original version of "Boys Don't Cry" charted for the first time in January 2026.)	—	22	—	—	70	BPI: 2× Platinum; RIAA: Platinum; RMNZ: 2× Platinum	Non-album singles
"Jumping Someone Else's Train"	1979	—	—	—	—	—	—	—	—	—	70		Non-album singles
"I'm a Cult Hero" (as Cult Hero)	1979	—	—	—	—	—	—	—	—	—	—		Non-album singles
"A Forest"	1980	31	—	—	—	—	26	38	—	—	47	BPI: Silver; RMNZ: Gold	Seventeen Seconds
"Primary"	1981	43	94	—	—	—	—	29	—	—	25		Faith
"Charlotte Sometimes"	1981	44	—	—	—	—	—	31	—	—	—		Non-album single
"The Hanging Garden"	1982	34	—	—	—	—	—	—	—	—	—		Pornography
"Let's Go to Bed"	1982	44	15	—	—	—	—	17	—	109	32		Non-album singles (Note: "Let's Go to Bed", "The Walk" and "The Love Cats" were later included on Japanese Whispers.)
"The Walk"	1983	12	34	—	—	19	—	—	—	—	—		Non-album singles
"The Lovecats"	1983	7	6	—	—	15	—	23	—	107	52	BPI: Silver	Non-album singles
"The Caterpillar"	1984	14	51	—	—	20	35	—	—	—	—		The Top
"In Between Days"	1985	15	16	23	45	17	26	15	—	99	39	BPI: Platinum	The Head on the Door
"Close to Me"	1985	24	7	17	—	19	16	45	—	—	32	BPI: Platinum; RMNZ: Platinum	The Head on the Door
"The Blood" (Note: "The Blood" was only released as a single in Spain.)	1986	—	—	—	—	—	—	—	—	—	—		The Head on the Door
"Boys Don't Cry" (New Voice – New Mix)	1986	22	26	28	19	9	27	10	31	—	—		Non-album single (Note: This re-recorded and remixed version of "Boys Don't Cry" was released to promote Standing on a Beach, but only the original version features on the album.)
"Why Can't I Be You?"	1987	21	16	29	29	12	25	16	5	54	27		Kiss Me, Kiss Me, Kiss Me
"Catch"	1987	27	77	—	59	16	57	—	30	—	—		Kiss Me, Kiss Me, Kiss Me
"Just Like Heaven"	1987	29	89	33	—	15	82	31	25	40	28	BPI: 2× Platinum; RMNZ: 2× Platinum	Kiss Me, Kiss Me, Kiss Me
"Hot Hot Hot!!!"	1988	45	—	—	—	18	79	—	8	65	11		Kiss Me, Kiss Me, Kiss Me
"Lullaby"	1989	5	28	22	3	3	8	7	4	74	31	BPI: Gold; RMNZ: Platinum	Disintegration
"Fascination Street" (Note: "Fascination Street" was only released as a single in North America.)	1989	—	—	—	—	—	—	—	—	46	7		Disintegration
"Lovesong"	1989	18	82	—	21	13	48	39	—	2	8	BPI: Gold; RMNZ: Platinum	Disintegration
"Pictures of You"	1990	24	89	—	18	9	77	—	—	71	33	BPI: Silver; RMNZ: Gold	Disintegration
"Never Enough"	1990	13	22	—	17	6	—	11	14	72	6		Mixed Up
"Close to Me" (remix)	1990	13	55	—	49	4	—	27	18	97	33		Mixed Up
"A Forest" (Tree Mix) (Note: This remix of "A Forest" was only released as a single in France.)	1990	—	—	—	—	—	—	—	—	—	—		Mixed Up
"High"	1992	8	5	11	14	6	37	4	19	42	22		Wish
"Friday I'm in Love"	1992	6	39	—	16	4	32	7	—	18	32	BPI: 3× Platinum; RMNZ: 3× Platinum	Wish
"A Letter to Elise"	1992	28	103	—	—	23	—	13	—	—	—		Wish
"The 13th"	1996	15	31	—	55	22	—	37	—	44	—		Wild Mood Swings
"Mint Car"	1996	31	100	—	—	—	—	—	—	58	—		Wild Mood Swings
"Strange Attraction" (Note: "Strange Attraction" was only released as a single in the US and Australia.)	1996	—	145	—	—	—	—	—	—	—	—		Wild Mood Swings
"Gone!"	1996	60	—	—	—	—	—	—	—	—	—		Wild Mood Swings
"Wrong Number"	1997	62	70	—	—	—	88	43	—	—	—		Galore: The Singles 1987–1997
"Cut Here"	2001	54	83	85	79	—	—	—	10	—	—		Greatest Hits
"The End of the World"	2004	25	—	70	47	42	—	—	—	—	—		The Cure
"Taking Off"	2004	39	—	67	73	—	—	—	9	—	—		The Cure
"alt.end" (Note: "alt.end" was only released as a single in the US.)	2004	—	—	—	—	—	—	—	—	—	—		The Cure
"The Only One"	2008	48	80	28	77	—	86	—	1	—	—		4:13 Dream
"Freakshow"	2008	89	91	30	78	—	—	—	1	—	—		4:13 Dream
"Sleep When I'm Dead"	2008	68	84	36	80	—	—	—	1	—	—		4:13 Dream
"The Perfect Boy"	2008	78	91	37	86	—	—	—	2	—	—		4:13 Dream
"Want" (Time Mix 2018)	2018	—	—	—	—	—	—	—	—	—	—		Torn Down: Mixed Up Extras 2018
"Disintegration" (live)	2019	—	—	—	—	—	—	—	—	—	—		40 Live (Curætion-25 + Anniversary)
"Alone"	2024	—	—	—	—	—	—	— (Note: "Alone" did not enter the NZ Top 40 Singles Chart, but peaked at number 22 on the NZ Hot Singles Chart.)	—	—	—		Songs of a Lost World
"Novembre: Live in France 2022"	2024	—	—	—	—	—	—	—	—	—	—		Non-album single
"A Fragile Thing"	2024	—	—	—	—	—	—	—	—	—	—		Songs of a Lost World
"—" denotes releases that did not chart or were not released in that territory.

=== Promotional singles ===
Title	Year	Peak chart positions	Album
Title	Year	US Alt	Album
"Grinding Halt"	1979	x	Three Imaginary Boys
"Lament" (Note: "Lament" was released as part of a Flexipop! magazine promo.)	1982	x	Non-album single
"One Hundred Years"	1982	x	Pornography
"Shake Dog Shake"	1984	x	The Top
"A Night Like This" (Note: "A Night Like This" was only released as a promotional single in the US.)	1985	x	The Head on the Door
"Hello, I Love You (Note: "Hello, I Love You" charted in the US due to airplay.)	1990	6	Rubáiyát: Elektra's 40th Anniversary
"Just Like Heaven" (live) (Note: This live version of "Just Like Heaven" was only released as a promotional single in the US.)	1993	—	Show
"Friday I'm in Love" (live) (Note: This live version of "Friday I'm in Love" was only released as a promotional single in the US.)	1993	—	Show
"Purple Haze" (Note: "Purple Haze" was only released as a promotional single in the US.)	1993	2	Stone Free: A Tribute to Jimi Hendrix
"Dredd Song" (Note: "Dredd Song" was only released as a promotional single in the US.)	1995	—	Judge Dredd (soundtrack)
"This Is a Lie" (Note: "This Is a Lie" was only released as a promotional single in France.)	1996	—	Wild Mood Swings
"Out of This World"	2000	—	Bloodflowers
"Maybe Someday"	2000	10	Bloodflowers
"The Last Day of Summer" (Note: "The Last Day of Summer" was only released as a promotional single in Poland.)	2000	—	Bloodflowers
"Just Say Yes" (featuring Saffron) (Note: "Just Say Yes" was only released as a promotional single in Europe.)	2002	—	Greatest Hits
"Love"	2005	—	Instant Karma: The Amnesty International Campaign to Save Darfur
"Hello Goodbye" (featuring James McCartney) "C Moon" (Credited to Robert Smith)	2014	—	The Art of McCartney
"It's Over" (Whisper Mix 2018)	2018	—	Torn Down: Mixed Up Extras 2018
"Like Cockatoos" (Lonely in the Rain Mix 2018)	2018	—	Torn Down: Mixed Up Extras 2018
"A Strange Day" (Drowning Waves Mix 2018)	2018	—	Torn Down: Mixed Up Extras 2018
"—" denotes releases that did not chart or were not released in that territory. "x" denotes that chart did not exist at the time.

== Other charted songs ==
Title	Year	Peak chart positions	Album
Title	Year	NZ Hot	Album
"And Nothing Is Forever"	2024	25	Songs of a Lost World
"Warsong"	2024	37	Songs of a Lost World
"All I Ever Am"	2024	28	Songs of a Lost World

== Videos ==
=== Video albums ===
Title	Album details	Peak chart positions				
Title	Album details	UK	GER	NL	SWI	US
Live in Japan	Released: February 1985; Label: Toshiba; Formats: VHS, Beta; Japan-only release	—	—	—	—	—
Tea Party	Released: December 1985; Label: VAP Video; Formats: VHS, Beta; Japan-only release	—	—	—	—	—
Staring at the Sea: The Images	Released: 23 May 1986; Label: Palace Video / Fiction Films, Elektra; Formats: VHS, Beta, LD	1	—	—	—	4
The Cure in Orange	Released: 12 November 1987; Label: PolyGram Music Video, Elektra; Formats: VHS, Beta, LD	19	—	—	—	4
Picture Show	Released: 8 July 1991; Label: PolyGram Music Video / Fiction, Elektra; Formats: VHS, LD	1	—	—	—	3
Play Out	Released: 25 November 1991; Label: Windsong, Fiction, Elektra; Formats: VHS, LD	7	—	—	—	11
Show	Released: 13 September 1993; Label: PolyGram Music Video / Fiction, Elektra; Formats: VHS, 2×CD-i, LD	2	—	—	—	30
Galore: The Videos 1987–1997	Released: 11 November 1997; Label: Fiction, Elektra; Formats: VHS	17	—	—	—	6
Greatest Hits	Released: 19 November 2001; Label: Fiction / Polydor / Universal, Elektra; Formats: DVD, VHS	26	—	—	—	—
The Cure: Trilogy	Released: 3 June 2003; Label: Eagle Vision; Formats: 2×VHS, 2×DVD, Blu-ray	7	28	16	—	4
Festival 2005	Released: 27 November 2006; Label: Geffen; Formats: DVD	—	—	—	—	—
40 Live (Curætion-25 + Anniversary)	Released: 18 October 2019; Label: Eagle Vision / Universal Music Group; Formats: 2×DVD, 2×Blu-ray, 2×DVD+4×CD, 2×Blu-ray+4×CD, digital download	1	—	—	4	—
Troxy Live 2024	Released: 13 December 2025; Label: Universal Music Group; Formats: DVD, Blu-ray	—				
"—" denotes releases that did not chart or were not released in that territory.

=== Music videos ===
Title	Year	Director
"10:15 Saturday Night"	1978	Piers Bedford
"A Forest"	1980	David Hillier
"Play for Today"	1980	David Hillier
"Primary"	1981	Bob Rickerd
"Other Voices"	1981	Bob Rickerd
"Charlotte Sometimes"	1981	Mick Mansfield
"The Hanging Garden"	1982	Chris Gabrin
"Let's Go to Bed"	1982	Tim Pope
"The Walk"	1983	Tim Pope
"The Lovecats"	1983	Tim Pope
"The Caterpillar"	1984	Tim Pope
"In Between Days"	1985	Tim Pope
"Close to Me"	1985	Tim Pope
"A Night Like This"	1985	Tim Pope
"The Blood"	1986	Gerard de Thame
"Boys Don't Cry"	1986	Tim Pope
"Killing an Arab"	1986	Tim Pope
"Jumping Someone Else's Train"	1986	Tim Pope
"Why Can't I Be You?"	1987	Tim Pope
"Catch"	1987	Tim Pope
"Just Like Heaven"	1987	Tim Pope
"Hot Hot Hot!!!"	1988	Tim Pope
"Lullaby"	1989	Tim Pope
"Fascination Street"	1989	Tim Pope
"Lovesong"	1989	Tim Pope
"Pictures of You"	1990	Tim Pope
"Never Enough"	1990	Tim Pope
"Close to Me" (remix)	1990	Tim Pope
"High"	1992	Tim Pope
"Friday I'm in Love"	1992	Tim Pope
"A Letter to Elise"	1992	Aubrey Powell
"The 13th"	1996	Sophie Muller
"Mint Car"	1996	Richard Heslop
"Gone!"	1996	Steve Hanft
"Wrong Number"	1997	Tim Pope
"Cut Here"	2001	Richard Anthony
"Just Say Yes"	2001	Richard Anthony
"The End of the World"	2004	Floria Sigismondi
"Taking Off"	2004	The Saline Project
"alt.end"	2004	The Saline Project
"The Only One"	2008	Unknown
"Freakshow"	2008	Unknown
"Sleep When I'm Dead"	2008	Unknown
"The Perfect Boy"	2008	Unknown

== Other appearances ==
Track	Year	Album
"One Hundred Years" (demo)	1981	Fast Forward 008/009: Annual Report
"Lullaby" (remix)	1990	Gänsehaut & Herzklopfen
"A Walk with the Cure" (Note: A mix of "A Walk", "In Between Days", "Lovesong" and "A Forest".)	1990	November 90: Mixes 1
"Close to Me" (Closer Mix)	1991	The Brits 1991
"Burn"	1994	The Crow (soundtrack)
"Young Americans"	1995	104.9
"World in My Eyes"	1998	For the Masses
"More Than This"	1998	The X-Files: The Album
"To The Sky"	1989	Stranger Than Fiction
"Watching Me Fall" (Underdog remix)	2000	American Psycho (soundtrack)
"A Forest" (Acoustic Version)	2004	Essential Glastonbury
"Make Me Bad"/"In Between Days" (with Korn)	2007	MTV Unplugged: Korn
"Just Like Heaven" (Cover Version by Adiescar Chase)	2023	Heartstopper (Season 2)
