= List of the Cure band members =

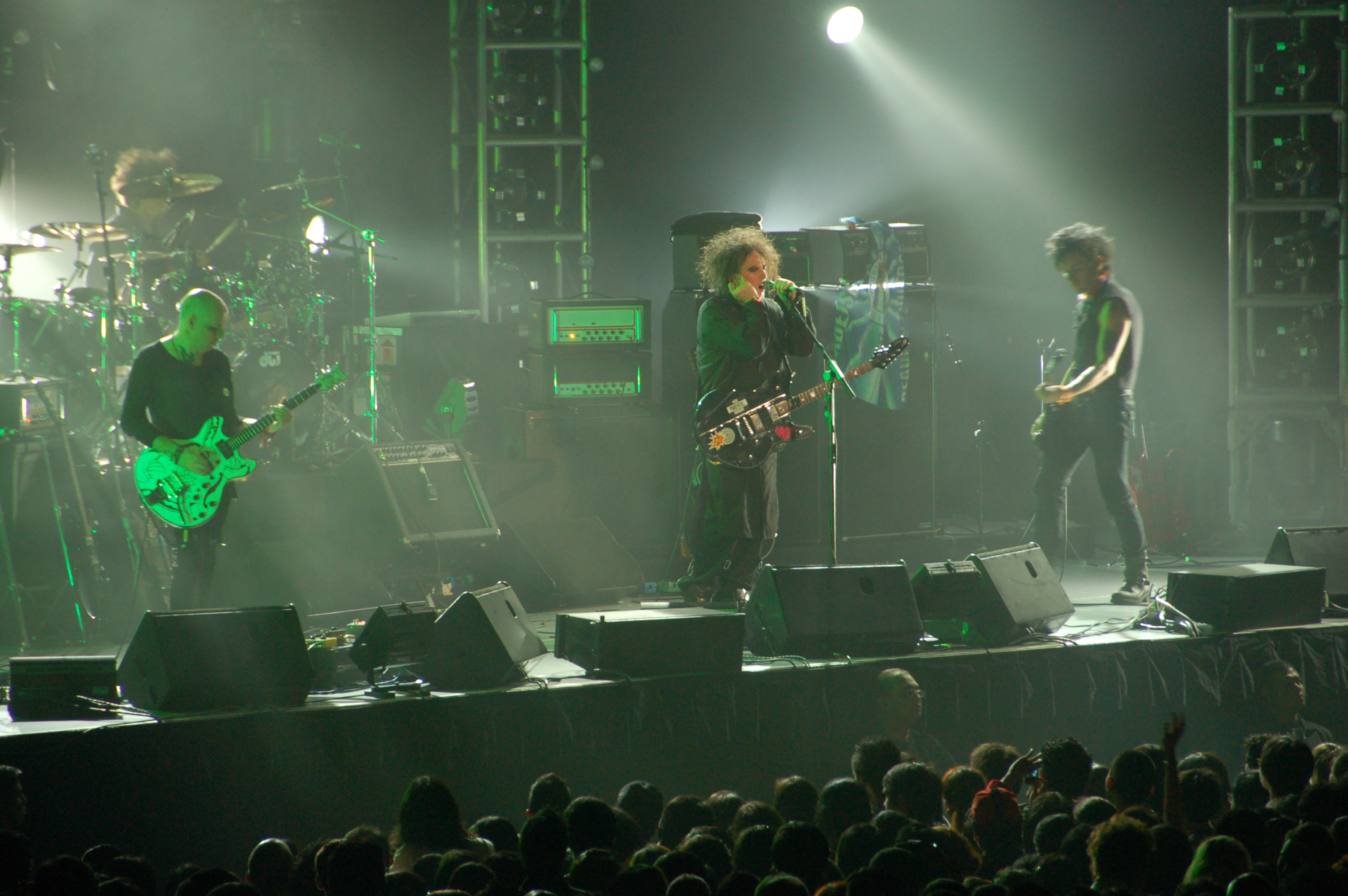
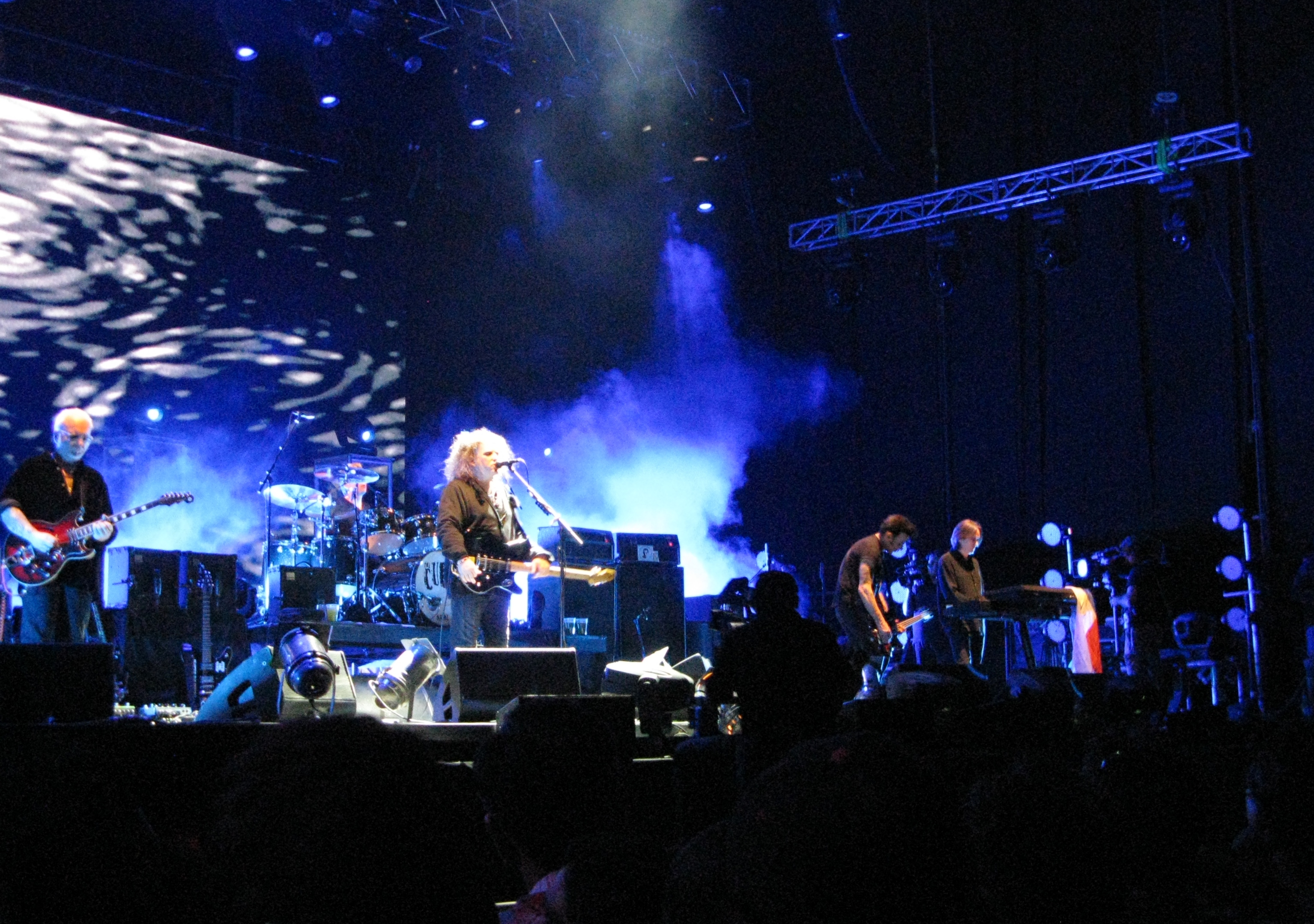
Two lineups of The Cure performing in 2007 (top) and 2013 (bottom).

The Cure are an English alternative rock band from Crawley. Formed in May 1978, the group originally consisted of vocalist, guitarist and keyboardist Robert Smith (the only constant member), bassist Michael Dempsey and drummer Lol Tolhurst. The current lineup includes Smith, bassist Simon Gallup (from 1979 to 1982, and since 1984), keyboardist Roger O'Donnell (from 1987 to 1990, 1995 to 2005, and since 2011), drummer Jason Cooper (since 1995) and guitarist Reeves Gabrels (since 2012).

== History ==
The Cure formed in May 1978, evolving from the previous outfits Malice and Easy Cure. The band's original incarnation featured vocalist and guitarist Robert Smith, bassist Michael Dempsey and drummer Lol Tolhurst. After the release and promotion of Three Imaginary Boys, Dempsey was replaced by Simon Gallup in November 1979, when keyboardist Matthieu Hartley also joined the band. Hartley performed on Seventeen Seconds, but by August 1980 had left the band. Keyboards on Faith and Pornography were performed by Smith, Gallup and Tolhurst. Following the end of the Pornography touring cycle in June 1982, Gallup left the Cure and the band was placed on a temporary hiatus. Later in the year, Smith and Tolhurst – now the band's keyboardist – returned with the single "Let's Go to Bed".

After several performances with stand-in musicians, the Cure returned in 1983 with new bassist Phil Thornalley and drummer Andy Anderson. Former Malice and Easy Cure guitarist Porl Thompson performed saxophone on the 1984 album The Top, before returning to the group on a full-time basis on guitar and keyboards. During the Top World Tour, Anderson was fired from the band due to problems stemming from alcohol abuse; he was briefly replaced by Vince Ely and later by Boris Williams, the latter of whom was subsequently offered the position full-time. Thornalley also left the band upon the tour's conclusion, replaced by the returning Gallup. The five-piece lineup of Smith, Thompson, Gallup, Williams and Tolhurst released two studio albums: 1985's The Head on the Door and 1987's Kiss Me, Kiss Me, Kiss Me.

For the tour in support of Kiss Me, Kiss Me, Kiss Me, the Cure added Roger O'Donnell as a second touring keyboardist. Tolhurst eventually left the band entirely, after limited contributions to both Kiss Me, Kiss Me, Kiss Me and its follow-up Disintegration, and O'Donnell was asked to join as an official member. His departure was announced in April 1989, when Smith claimed that he "wasn't taking it seriously enough". O'Donnell remained only until the following June, when he left due to "personal differences" and was replaced by the band's guitar technician Perry Bamonte. The new lineup released Wish in 1992, before Thompson left in early 1993 and Bamonte took over as main guitarist. The Cure spent much of 1994 on hiatus, as Smith was involved in a legal dispute with former bandmate Tolhurst. By the time they returned to the studio later in the year, Williams had left.

In spring 1995, the Cure commenced recording for their next album with new drummer Jason Cooper and returning keyboardist O'Donnell. This lineup remained active for ten years, releasing three studio albums and one live collection, before Bamonte and O'Donnell were dismissed in May 2005. The keyboardist later claimed that Smith would be reducing the Cure back to a three-piece, with Bamonte and himself the two members culled from the lineup. The remaining trio recorded a cover of John Lennon's "Love" for the Amnesty International album Make Some Noise, before Porl Thompson returned for summer tour dates starting in July.

In May and November 2011, the band performed a series of shows with former members Tolhurst and O'Donnell as special guests, although Thompson was not included. On 1 May 2012, after not performing with the band since 2009, Thompson announced that he was no longer a member of the Cure. He was replaced for subsequent tour dates by Reeves Gabrels, who became an official member after a few shows.

In 2019, Eden Gallup filled in on bass guitar for two shows when his father, Simon Gallup, was prevented from playing, due to personal circumstances. In August 2021, Simon Gallup announced that he had quit the band, although he said he was still in the band the following month. On October 6, 2022, Perry Bamonte returned to the lineup on the first show of the Lost World Tour in Riga, Latvia. In Fall of 2025, the band announced their first festival show of 2026 with a promotional picture that did not include Perry Bamonte, which Roger O'Donnell confirmed was the lineup going forward. On December 26, 2025, the band announced that Bamonte had died following a short illness. Eden Gallup rejoined the band on 5 June 2026, playing guitar and keyboards at Primavera Sound, in Barcelona.

== Members ==
=== Current ===
Image	Name	Years active	Instruments	Release contributions
	Robert Smith	1978–present	guitars; vocals; keyboards; six-string bass; harmonica; recorder; violin; sitar; drums; tambourine	all Cure releases to date
	Simon Gallup	1979–1982; 1984–present (guest earlier in 1979)	bass; keyboards; occasional guitars	Seventeen Seconds (1980); Faith (1981); Pornography (1982); all Cure releases from The Head on the Door (1985) onwards
	Roger O'Donnell	1987–1989 (touring); 1989–1990; 1995–2005; 2011–present	keyboards; tambourine; percussion (2011 Reflections shows)	Disintegration (1989); Entreat (1990); all Cure releases from Wild Mood Swings (1996) to The Cure (2004); Bestival Live 2011 (2011); 40 Live (Curætion-25 + Anniversary) (2019); "Novembre: Live in France 2022" (2024); Songs of a Lost World (2024)
	Jason Cooper	1995–present	drums; percussion; occasional samples	all Cure releases from Wild Mood Swings (1996) onwards
	Reeves Gabrels	2012–present (guest in 1997)	guitars; six-string bass; electric sitar	"Wrong Number" (1997); 40 Live (Curætion-25 + Anniversary) (2019); "Novembre: Live in France 2022" (2024); Songs of a Lost World (2024)

=== Former ===
Image	Name	Years active	Instruments	Release contributions
	Lol Tolhurst	1978–1989 (guest in 2011)	drums (1978–1982, 1985-1986); keyboards (1982–1989, 2011); percussion (2011 Reflections shows); drum machine (1982-1989); bass (1982); • vibraphone (1983) • guitar (1981, 1986) • trumpet, violin (1987) • backing vocals (1978, 1983)	all Cure releases from "Killing an Arab" (1978) to Disintegration (1989)
	Michael Dempsey	1978–1979	bass; backing and occasional lead vocals	"Killing an Arab" (1978); Three Imaginary Boys (1979); "Boys Don't Cry" (1979); "Jumping Someone Else's Train" (1979)
	Matthieu Hartley	1979–1980 (guest earlier in 1979)	keyboards	Seventeen Seconds (1980)
	Andy Anderson	1983–1984 (guest earlier in 1983) (died 2019)	drums; percussion	The Top (1984); Concert: The Cure Live (1984); Live in Japan (1985)
	Phil Thornalley	1983–1984	bass • double bass, keyboards (1983)	The Top (1984); Concert: The Cure Live (1984); Live in Japan (1985)
	Porl Thompson	1984–1993; 2005–2011, (guest in 1979, 1983 and earlier in 1984) (also a member of Easy Cure)	guitars; keyboards; saxophone; six-string bass; double bass (1983)	Three Imaginary Boys (1979); all Cure releases from The Top (1984) to Paris (1993); Festival 2005 (2006); 4:13 Dream (2008)
	Boris Williams	1984–1994 (guest in 2001)	drums; percussion; kazoo (1991)	all Cure releases from The Head on the Door (1985) to Paris (1993); Acoustic Hits (2001)
	Perry Bamonte	1990–2005; 2022–2025; (died 2025)	guitars; keyboards; six-string bass; drums (1995); percussion (1996-2005); xylophone, bassoon (1991)	all Cure releases from Play Out (1991) to The Cure (2004); "Novembre: Live in France 2022" (2024)

=== Substitute performers ===
Image	Name	Years active	Instruments	Details
	The Venomettes	1983	strings	Severin and the Venomettes performed with the band during early 1983 for the BBC Two show Riverside.
	Steven Severin	1983	bass	Severin and the Venomettes performed with the band during early 1983 for the BBC Two show Riverside.
	Derek Thompson	1983	bass	Thompson performed one show with the Cure in April 1983 for the BBC Two show the Oxford Road Show.
	Norman Fisher	1984	bass	Fisher substituted for Phil Thornalley in March 1984 for a second performance on the Oxford Road Show.
	Vince Ely	1984	drums	After Andy Anderson left the band due to issues with alcohol abuse, he was temporarily replaced by Ely.
	Roberto Soave	1992	bass	Soave substituted for Simon Gallup, who had contracted pleurisy, for several shows in November 1992.
	Eden Gallup	2019; 2026	bass; keyboards and guitar (2026)	Simon Gallup's son and bass tech, substituted for his father for a performance at the Fuji Rock Festival in July 2019 and Austin City Limits Festival in October 2019. On 5 June 2026 he rejoined the band playing guitar and keyboards at Primavera Sound Festival.
	Mike Lord	2023	keyboards	Due to health reasons, keyboard tech Mike Lord stepped in for Roger O'Donnell on the Latin American leg of the 2023 Shows of A Lost World Tour

== Lineups ==
Period	Members	Releases
May 1978 – November 1979	Robert Smith – guitars, lead vocals, harmonica; Lol Tolhurst – drums; Michael Dempsey – bass, backing and lead vocals	"Killing an Arab" (1978); Three Imaginary Boys (1979); "Boys Don't Cry" (1979); "Jumping Someone Else's Train" (1979); The Peel Sessions (1988)
November 1979 – December 1980	Robert Smith – guitars, vocals, harmonica; Lol Tolhurst – drums; Simon Gallup – bass; Matthieu Hartley – keyboards	Seventeen Seconds (1980)
December 1980 – June 1982	Robert Smith – guitars, vocals, keyboards, harmonica, cello, bass; Lol Tolhurst – drums, keyboards, drum machine; Simon Gallup – bass, keyboards	Faith (1981); "Charlotte Sometimes" (1981); Pornography (1982)
June 1982 – June 1983	Robert Smith – guitars, vocals, bass, keyboards; Lol Tolhurst – keyboards, drum machine	"Let's Go to Bed" (1982); "The Walk" (1983)
June 1983 – January 1984	Robert Smith – guitars, vocals, keyboards; Lol Tolhurst – keyboards, drum machine; Phil Thornalley – bass; Andy Anderson – drums, percussion	"The Love Cats" (1983)
January – October 1984	Robert Smith – guitars, vocals, keyboards, violin, harmonica, recorder; Lol Tolhurst – keyboards, drum machine; Phil Thornalley – bass; Andy Anderson – drums, percussion; Porl Thompson – guitar, keyboards, saxophone	The Top (1984) (without Thornalley); Concert: The Cure Live (1984); Live in Japan (1985)
October – November 1984	Robert Smith – guitars, vocals, keyboards, violin, harmonica, recorder; Lol Tolhurst – keyboards, drum machine; Phil Thornalley – bass; Porl Thompson – guitars, keyboards, saxophone; Vince Ely – drums (touring only)	none
November 1984 – April 1987	Robert Smith – guitars, vocals, keyboards; Lol Tolhurst – keyboards, drum machine; Porl Thompson – guitar, keyboards, saxophone; Simon Gallup – bass; Boris Williams – drums, percussion	The Head on the Door (1985); Half an Octopuss/Quadpus (1985); The Cure in Orange (1987); Kiss Me, Kiss Me, Kiss Me (1987)
April 1987 – April 1989	Robert Smith – vocals, guitar, keyboards; Lol Tolhurst – keyboards, drum machine; Porl Thompson – guitars; Simon Gallup – bass, keyboards; Boris Williams – drums, percussion; Roger O'Donnell – keyboards (touring)	Disintegration (1989)
April 1989 – June 1990	Robert Smith – guitars, vocals, keyboards, bass; Porl Thompson – guitars; Simon Gallup – bass; Boris Williams – drums, percussion; Roger O'Donnell – keyboards	Entreat (1990)
June 1990 – early 1993	Robert Smith – guitars, vocals, keyboards, bass; Porl Thompson – guitars; Simon Gallup – bass, keyboards; Boris Williams – drums, percussion; Perry Bamonte – keyboards, guitars, bass	"Never Enough" (1990); Play Out (1991); Wish (1992); Show (1993); Paris (1993)
Early 1993 – late 1994	Robert Smith – guitars, vocals, keyboards, bass; Simon Gallup – bass; Boris Williams – drums, percussion; Perry Bamonte – guitars, keyboards, bass	"Purple Haze" (1993); "Burn" (1994)
Spring 1995 – late 2001	Robert Smith – guitars, vocals, keyboards, bass; Simon Gallup – bass; Perry Bamonte – guitars, keyboards, bass; Roger O'Donnell – keyboards; Jason Cooper – drums, percussion	Wild Mood Swings (1996); Bloodflowers (2000)
Late 2001	Robert Smith – guitars, vocals, keyboards, bass; Simon Gallup – bass; Perry Bamonte – guitars, keyboards, bass; Roger O'Donnell – keyboards; Jason Cooper – drums, percussion; Boris Williams – percussion (guest)	Acoustic Hits (2001)
Late 2001 – May 2005	Robert Smith – guitars, vocals, keyboards, bass; Simon Gallup – bass; Perry Bamonte – guitars, keyboards, bass; Jason Cooper – drums, percussion; Roger O'Donnell – keyboards	Trilogy (2003); The Cure (2004)
May – June 2005	Robert Smith – guitars, vocals, keyboards, bass; Simon Gallup – bass; Jason Cooper – drums, percussion	Love (2005)
June 2005 – May 2011	Robert Smith – guitars, vocals, keyboards, bass; Simon Gallup – bass; Jason Cooper – drums, percussion; Porl Thompson – guitars	Festival 2005 (2006); 4:13 Dream (2008)
May – June 2011	Robert Smith – guitars, vocals, keyboards, bass, harmonica; Simon Gallup – bass; Jason Cooper – drums, percussion; Lol Tolhurst – keyboards, percussion (guest); Roger O'Donnell – keyboards, percussion (guest)	none – Reflections shows only
June – November 2011	Robert Smith – guitars, vocals, keyboards, bass; Simon Gallup – bass; Jason Cooper – drums, percussion; Roger O'Donnell – keyboards	Bestival Live 2011 (2011)
November 2011	Robert Smith – guitars, vocals, keyboards, bass, harmonica; Simon Gallup – bass; Jason Cooper – drums, percussion; Roger O'Donnell – keyboards, percussion; Lol Tolhurst – keyboards, percussion (guest)	none – Reflections shows only
December 2011 – May 2012	Robert Smith – guitars, vocals, keyboards, bass; Simon Gallup – bass; Jason Cooper – drums, percussion; Roger O'Donnell – keyboards, percussion	none
May 2012 – October 2022	Robert Smith – guitars, vocals, keyboards, bass, harmonica, recorder, tambourine; Simon Gallup – bass; Jason Cooper – drums, percussion; Roger O'Donnell – keyboards, percussion; Reeves Gabrels – guitars, bass	40 Live (Curætion-25 + Anniversary) (2019); Songs of a Lost World (2024) largely recorded in 2019
October 2022 – September 2025	Robert Smith – guitars, vocals, keyboards, bass, percussion, recorder; Simon Gallup – bass; Jason Cooper – drums, percussion; Roger O'Donnell – keyboards; Reeves Gabrels – guitars, bass; Perry Bamonte – guitars, keyboards, bass	"Novembre: Live in France 2022" (2024)
September 2025 – present	Robert Smith – guitars, vocals, keyboards, bass, percussion, recorder; Simon Gallup – bass; Jason Cooper – drums, percussion; Roger O'Donnell – keyboards; Reeves Gabrels – guitars, bass	none
