= List of number-one singles of 2008 (Spain) =

This is a list of the Spanish PROMUSICAE Top 20 physical Singles number-ones of 2008.

Issue date	Artist	Song
6 January	Dogma Crew	"Nacen de la bruma"
13 January	Dogma Crew	"Nacen de la bruma"
20 January	Dogma Crew	"Nacen de la bruma"
27 January	Dogma Crew	"Nacen de la bruma"
3 February	Dogma Crew	"Nacen de la bruma"
10 February	Cast Of High School Musical	"Be Mine"
17 February	Cast Of High School Musical	"Be Mine"
24 February	Cast Of High School Musical	"Be Mine"
2 March	Cast Of High School Musical	"Be Mine"
9 March	Cast Of High School Musical	"Be Mine"
16 March	Cast Of High School Musical	"Be Mine"
23 March	Mónica Naranjo	"Europa"
30 March	Mónica Naranjo	"Europa"
6 April	Mónica Naranjo	"Europa"
13 April	Mónica Naranjo	"Europa"
20 April	Mónica Naranjo	"Europa"
27 April	Mónica Naranjo	"Europa"
4 May	La Habitación Roja	"Esta no será otra canción de amor"
11 May	Madonna featuring Justin	"4 Minutes"
18 May	The Cure	"The Only One"
25 May	The Cure	"The Only One"
1 June	The Cure	"The Only One"
8 June	The Cure	"The Only One"
15 June	Madonna featuring Justin	"4 Minutes"
22 June	The Cure	"Freakshow"
29 June	The Cure	"Freakshow"
6 July	The Cure	"Freakshow"
13 July	The Cure	"Freakshow"
20 July	The Cure	"Sleep When I'm Dead"
27 July	Mónica Naranjo	"Amor y lujo"
3 August	Mónica Naranjo	"Amor y lujo"
10 August	Mónica Naranjo	"Amor y lujo"
17 August	Mónica Naranjo	"Amor y lujo"
24 August	Madonna	"Give It 2 Me"
31 August	Madonna	"Give It 2 Me"
7 September	Madonna	"Give It 2 Me"
14 September	Madonna	"Give It 2 Me"
21 September	The Cure	"Hypnagogic States"
28 September	The Cure	"Hypnagogic States"
5 October	Cast Of High School Musical	"Be Mine" [Holiday Pack]
12 October	Cast Of High School Musical	"Be Mine" [Holiday Pack]
19 October	Cast Of High School Musical	"Be Mine" [Holiday Pack]
26 October	Cooper	"Lemon Pop"
2 November	Cooper	"Lemon Pop"
9 November	Cooper	"Lemon Pop"
16 November	Cooper	"Lemon Pop"
23 November	Cooper	"Lemon Pop"
30 November	Cooper	"Lemon Pop"
7 December	Cooper	"Lemon Pop"
14 December	Madonna	"Miles Away"
21 December	Madonna	"Miles Away"
28 December	Anastacia	"Pieces of a Dream"

== See also ==
- 2008 in music
- List of number-one hits in Spain
