= Festival 2005 =

Video by The Cure
- Released: 27 November 2006 (UK); 5 December 2006 (US)
- Length: 155 minutes
- Language: English
- Producer: Daren Butler (video editor)

The Cure chronology
The Cure: Trilogy (2003)	Festival 2005 (2006)	40 Live (Curætion-25 + Anniversary) (2019)

Festival 2005

EP by The Cure
- Released: 26 December 2006
- Genre: Post-punk
- Length: 11:51
- Label: Geffen

The Cure EP chronology
Five Swing Live (1997)	Festival 2005 (2006)	Hypnagogic States (2008)

Festival 2005 is a live DVD by English rock band The Cure released in late 2006. It was shot during the band's headlining shows at 9 European music festivals in the summer of 2005. The video features a variety of angles "captured by a mix of fans, crew and 'on-the-night-big-screen cameras'." It was the first physical (non-digital download) release by the band since guitarist Porl Thompson returned to the line-up.

An extended play containing three of the tracks from the DVD was also made available.

== Track listing ==
=== DVD ===
1. "Open" (from Wish)
2. "Fascination Street" (from Disintegration)
3. "alt.end" (from The Cure)
4. "The Blood" (from The Head on the Door)
5. "A Night Like This" (from The Head on the Door)
6. "The End of the World" (from The Cure)
7. "If Only Tonight We Could Sleep" (from Kiss Me, Kiss Me, Kiss Me)
8. "The Kiss" (from Kiss Me, Kiss Me, Kiss Me)
9. "Shake Dog Shake" (from The Top)
10. "Us or Them" (from The Cure)
11. "Never Enough" (from Mixed Up)
12. "The Figurehead" (from Pornography)
13. "A Strange Day" (from Pornography)
14. "Push" (from The Head on the Door)
15. "Just Like Heaven" (from Kiss Me, Kiss Me, Kiss Me)
16. "In Between Days" (from The Head on the Door)
17. "From the Edge of the Deep Green Sea" (from Wish)
18. "The Drowning Man" (from Faith)
19. "Signal to Noise" (B-side to "Cut Here")
20. "The Baby Screams" (from The Head on the Door)
21. "One Hundred Years" (from Pornography)
22. "Shiver and Shake" (from Kiss Me, Kiss Me, Kiss Me)
23. "End" (from Wish)
24. "At Night" (from Seventeen Seconds)
25. "M" (from Seventeen Seconds)
26. "Play for Today" (from Seventeen Seconds)
27. "A Forest" (from Seventeen Seconds)
28. "Plainsong" (from Disintegration)
29. "Disintegration" (from Disintegration)
30. "Faith" (from Faith)

=== EP ===
1. "alt.end" – 4:34
2. "Push – 4:34
3. "In Between Days" – 2:43

== Personnel ==
- Simon Gallup – bass
- Robert Smith – vocals, guitar, six string bass
- Porl Thompson – guitar
- Jason Cooper – drums
