= Hypnagogic States =

EP by The Cure
- Released: 13 September 2008
- Recorded: 2007–2008
- Length: 37:02
- Label: I AM, Geffen
- Producer: Robert Smith, Keith Uddin

The Cure chronology
The Cure (2004)	Hypnagogic States (2008)	4:13 Dream (2008)

Hypnagogic States EP is a remix EP by The Cure, released on 13 September 2008. It contains remixes of the first four singles from the band's album, 4:13 Dream: "The Only One", "Freakshow", "Sleep When I'm Dead" and "The Perfect Boy". The album is the second remix album/EP by The Cure, following Mixed Up.

== Background ==
Existence of the EP was made public by Robert Smith via an announcement on The Cure's website on 23 July 2008. The songs were remixed by Jared Leto of Thirty Seconds to Mars, Jade Puget of AFI, Julien-K, Gerard Way of My Chemical Romance, Pete Wentz and Patrick Stump of Fall Out Boy, and Cure opener 65daysofstatic. All profit generated by the release will benefit the International Red Cross.

== Release ==
In the statement about the release made on the band's website, Robert Smith remarked that there may be more than one remix EP, due to the number of people wishing to remix the four songs. The track listing was announced by Smith on the band's website on August 8, 2008. Due to the overpricing of the EP on iTunes, Robert Smith has urged people to wait until it is priced around £4.00 or less, than the £7.99 being charged by iTunes currently. The iTunes release contains an exclusive remix of "The Only One" by 65daysofstatic as track 6.

Smith wrote to the band's label, Geffen, regarding the pricing issue, stating that the pricing was "totally fucking wrong". A spokesperson for the label later explained that the EP had been accidentally priced as an album and, recategorised as an EP, dropped its cost from September 17, 2008.

== Track listing ==
1. "The Only One" (Remix 4 by Thirty Seconds to Mars) – 4:25
2. "Freakshow" (Wolves at the Gate Remix by Jade Puget (AFI)) – 3:18
3. "Sleep When I'm Dead" (Remix 4 by Gerard Way (MCR) and Julien-K) – 4:04
4. "The Perfect Boy" (Remix 4 by Patrick Stump / Pete Wentz (FOB)) – 3:51
5. "Exploding Head Syndrome" (4 Single Remix by 65daysofstatic) – 21:27

=== iTunes bonus track ===
6. "The Only One" (Remix 65 by 65daysofstatic) – 4:28

== Charts ==
Chart (2008)	Peak position
France (SNEP)	39
Spain (PROMUSICAE)	1
