= Essential Glastonbury =

Compilation album by Various Artists
- Released: July 2004
- Recorded: Various
- Genre: Rock
- Length: 49:01
- Label: Various
- Compiler: Q

Essential Glastonbury is a promotional cover CD given away with issue 216 of Q magazine. The CD was released in cooperation with Greenpeace with the result that the cover was printed on recycled paper. The following excerpt is the introduction from the inside of the cover sleeve.

A NOTE FROM GREENPEACE — Ancient forests are home to nearly two thirds of the world’s land-based species and are vital to the health of our planet. Yet these unique ecosystems are still being trashed, often to make throwaway timber and paper products

A NOTE FROM THOM YORKE OF RADIOHEAD — right now we are wiping out many rare and very important species, permanently. All for the sake of crap garden Furniture and click-together floors. Nuts.

Visit www.saveordelete.com to find out more about how to change this situation. If you are at the Glastonbury Festival 2004 come and visit us at the Greenpeace field.

== See also ==
- Q
- Greenpeace

== Notes ==
The live version of "Block Rockin' Beats" was previously unreleased. "A Forest" (Acoustic Version) was only previously featured on Acoustic Hits.

== Track listing ==
1. "Time Is Running Out" (Muse) – 3:58
2. "Imitation of Life" (R.E.M.) – 3:58
3. "Ifwhiteamericatoldthetruthforonedayit'sworldwouldfallapart" (Manic Street Preachers) – 3:41
4. "The Village Green Preservation Society" (The Kinks) – 2:47
5. "Fake Plastic Trees" (Radiohead) – 4:52
6. "Yellow (Live)" (Coldplay) – 5:36
7. "A Forest (Acoustic Version)" (The Cure) – 4:52
8. "1984" (David Bowie) – 3:28
9. "Do You Realize??" (The Flaming Lips) – 3:34
10. "Clones" (Ash) – 4:01
11. "Madame Helga" (Stereophonics) – 3:55
12. "Block Rockin' Beats (Live)" (The Chemical Brothers) – 4:19
