= The End of the World (The Cure song) =

2004 single by the Cure

Single by the Cure

from the album The Cure
- B-side: "This Morning"; "Fake"
- Released: 19 July 2004
- Genre: Alternative rock
- Length: 3:44
- Label: Geffen
- Songwriters: Robert Smith; Perry Bamonte; Simon Gallup; Jason Cooper; Roger O'Donnell
- Producers: Robert Smith; Ross Robinson

The Cure singles chronology
"Cut Here" (2001)	"The End of the World" (2004)	"The Only One" (2008)

"The End of the World" is a song by English rock band the Cure. It was the first single to be released from their 12th studio album, The Cure (2004), and reached the top 40 in Italy and the United Kingdom.

== Music video ==
The music video was directed by Floria Sigismondi and shows Smith in a house which begins to destroy itself. As he leaves the house, it becomes debris and the rest of the band find stuff from the debris. The video ends with the house rebuilding itself and Smith going back inside and plants growing on the floor.

== Release ==
"The End of the World" was the band's most successful single since 1996's "Mint Car", peaking at number 19 in Italy, number 25 on the UK Singles Chart, number 19 on the Billboard Hot Modern Rock Tracks chart in the United States, and number 42 on the Irish Singles Chart. The song also charted in France, Germany, and Switzerland.

== Track listing ==
1. "The End of the World (Radio Edit)" – 3:31
2. "This Morning" – 7:14
3. "Fake" – 4:41

== Personnel ==
- Robert Smith – vocals, guitar
- Simon Gallup – bass guitar
- Perry Bamonte – guitar
- Roger O'Donnell – keyboards
- Jason Cooper – drums

== Charts ==
=== Weekly charts ===
Weekly chart performance for "The End of the World"
Chart (2004)	Peak position
France (SNEP)	70
Germany (GfK)	47
Ireland (IRMA)	42
Italy (FIMI)	19
Scottish Singles Sales (Official Charts)	38
Switzerland (Schweizer Hitparade)	95
UK Singles (Official Charts)	25
US Alternative Airplay (Billboard)	19

=== Year-end charts ===
Year-end chart performance for "The End of the World"
Chart (2004)	Position
US Modern Rock Tracks (Billboard)	86
