= The Cure: 'Reflections' =

Set of 2011 shows by The Cure

The Cure: "Reflections" refers to a set of shows in which The Cure played their first three albums Three Imaginary Boys, Seventeen Seconds and Faith in full at the VividLive festival at the Sydney Opera House on 31 May and 1 June 2011. All three albums were played in their entirety on both nights, along with several other tracks from the same era.

The Cure announced that these "Reflections" shows would involve a 'uniquely evolving' line-up, which includes former keyboardists Lol Tolhurst and Roger O'Donnell (who left the band in 1989 and 2005 respectively), but notably did not include guitarist Porl Thompson who rejoined the band in 2005. It was Tolhurst's first performance with The Cure for 22 years, and O'Donnell's first performance for six years. At the time of the shows, it was not immediately clear whether Tolhurst and O'Donnell would be rejoining the band permanently.

Later in 2011, O'Donnell confirmed he would be rejoining the band on a permanent basis. Tolhurst departed again after the 'Reflections' reunion, whilst Thompson remains absent from the current line-up.

According to a statement released by Vivid LIVE, "this will be the first, and only, time The Cure perform these albums in succession." However, the band went on to perform seven additional 'Reflections' gigs in November: one in London, and three each in Los Angeles and New York.

== Show Lineup ==
The lineup for each album is as follows:

Three Imaginary Boys (1979)

The Cure Trio: Robert Smith (vocals, guitar, harmonica), Simon Gallup (bass guitar), Jason Cooper (drums)

Seventeen Seconds (1980)

The Cure Quartet: Robert Smith (vocals, guitar), Simon Gallup (bass guitar), Jason Cooper (drums), Roger O'Donnell (keyboards)

Faith (1981)

The Cure Quintet: Robert Smith (vocals, guitar), Simon Gallup (bass guitar), Jason Cooper (drums), Roger O'Donnell (keyboards), Lol Tolhurst (percussion, keyboards)

== Setlist ==
Three Imaginary Boys: 10.15 Saturday Night, Accuracy, Grinding Halt, Another Day, Object, Subway Song, Foxy Lady (Jimi Hendrix cover), Meathook, So What, Fire In Cairo, It's Not You, Three Imaginary Boys, The Weedy Burton

Seventeen Seconds: A Reflection, Play For Today, Secrets, In Your House, Three, The Final Sound, A Forest, M, At Night, Seventeen Seconds

Faith: The Holy Hour, Primary, Other Voices, All Cats Are Grey, The Funeral Party, Doubt, The Drowning Man, Faith

Encore 1: World War, I'm Cold, Plastic Passion, Boys Don't Cry, Killing An Arab (performed as "Killing Another"), Jumping Someone Else's Train/Another Journey By Train

Encore 2: Descent, Splintered In Her Head, Charlotte Sometimes, The Hanging Garden

Encore 3: Let's Go to Bed, The Walk, The Lovecats

The New York gigs also saw encore performances of: The Caterpillar, In Between Days and Close to Me, not played at the previous shows. In addition, the November 26th gig in New York included a performance of the Boys Don't Cry b-side "Do The Hansa", not played during any other night of the tour.

== Video Release Information ==
The Cure: "Reflections" concert is set to be released on DVD and Blu-ray.
