= 4:13 Dream =

Studio album by the Cure
- Released: 27 October 2008
- Recorded: 2006–2008
- Genres: Alternative rock; indie rock; funk rock; gothic rock; psychedelic rock; garage rock
- Length: 52:28
- Labels: Suretone; Geffen
- Producers: Robert Smith; Keith Uddin

The Cure chronology
The Cure (2004)	4:13 Dream (2008)	Bestival Live 2011 (2011)

Singles from 4:13 Dream
- 1. "The Only One" Released: 13 May 2008; 2. "Freakshow" Released: 13 June 2008; 3. "Sleep When I'm Dead" Released: 13 July 2008; 4. "The Perfect Boy" Released: 13 August 2008

4:13 Dream is the thirteenth studio album by the English rock band the Cure, released on 27 October 2008 by Suretone and Geffen Records. It was produced by Robert Smith and Keith Uddin.

The album was preceded by four singles, all of which were released on 13th of each month, starting in May with "The Only One" and ending in August with "The Perfect Boy". The band also released a remix EP in September, also on the 13th, titled Hypnagogic States (2008), which featured remixes from Fall Out Boy and Thirty Seconds to Mars. It was the band's last album of original material until Songs of a Lost World (2024).

It received mixed reception from critics, with many feeling it was too similar to the band's previous output.

== Production ==
Some songs featured on the album were recycled demos from earlier album sessions. One track was from the 1990s and two were from the 1980s, including "Sleep When I'm Dead", which was originally written for the 1985 album The Head on the Door.

Smith co-produced the album with the assistance of Keith Uddin. Apart from the four band members and Uddin, no one was allowed in the recording sessions, in order to limit distractions. Smith said the band no longer screamed at each other over disagreements and that "The feeling in the studio [was] electric". Guitarist Porl Thompson rejoined The Cure after quitting for several years to focus on his visual art career.

=== Outtakes ===
4:13 Dream was originally intended to be a double album; however, frontman Robert Smith confirmed in interviews that this idea was scrapped, despite the fact that 33 songs had been recorded. Therefore, at least 20 additional songs were recorded for the album that did not make the final cut, with four being used for B-sides. Robert Smith has said, "Compiling a single CD album required a different approach (for one thing there was no longer the time to 'spread out' and connect the different moods as I had originally intended) and as a consequence a number of (my favourite!) slower songs and instrumental pieces were left unfinished and unreleased." He also believed a double album version would be a limited release, mixed by himself, while the single album release would be compiled by the record company. He mentioned songs making the album included "Lusting in Your Mind", which he called "heavy rock", "Christmas Without You", which would go on to become "It Can Never Be The Same" and see release on 40 Live (Curætion-25 + Anniversary) (2018), "The Hungry Ghost", and "The Perfect Boy". Only the last two tracks would see release on the album, with the first track remaining unreleased. Smith attested that the album would mostly comprise the upbeat songs the band recorded, while the darker songs may be released on another album.

B-Sides / Outtakes
Title	Release
"NY Trip"	The Only One
"All Kinds of Stuff"	Freakshow
"Down Under"	Sleep When I'm Dead
"Without You"	The Perfect Boy
"Lusting in Your Mind"	Unreleased
"Please Come Home"	Unreleased
"Christmas Without You" (It Can Never Be the Same)	40 Live (Curætion-25 + Anniversary)

Shortly after the release of Songs of a Lost World, Smith said that there are 14 or 15 songs from the 4:13 Dream sessions that remain unreleased, which he has considered releasing in some form.

== Promotion ==
On 6 October 2007, the Cure played the first song from the upcoming album, "The Only One" (then titled "Please Project") at the Download Festival in Mountain View, California as part of their 4Tour. Following this, the band slowly introduced other songs from the album. In order to finish recording 4:13 Dream by early 2008, they delayed their North American tour by eight months. Later in the tour, the band performed the songs "Underneath the Stars", "The Perfect Boy", "Sleep When I'm Dead", "Freakshow" (then titled "Don't Say Anything"), "The Only One" (then titled "Please Project") and "It's Over" (then titled "Baby Rag Dog Book") at various shows. Although rumoured to appear on the album from early reports, another song, "A Boy I Never Knew", was omitted from the final track listing.

On 1 May 2008, the Cure posted a bulletin on their MySpace page saying that the thirteenth day of each month leading up to the release of the album (May, June, July and August) would see the release of a single, including a B-side from the album recording session that would not make the final cut. The four outtakes used were: "NY Trip", "All Kinds of Stuff", "Down Under" and "Without You".

The first single, "The Only One", was released on 13 May, followed by "Freakshow" on 13 June, "Sleep When I'm Dead" on 13 July and "The Perfect Boy" on 13 August.

On 21 August the title of the album was announced online as 4.13 Dream, corrected three days later to 4:13 Dream. The official track listing was first revealed on the band's official website on 15 September.

Smith also mentioned the "dark album" companion piece, and jokingly stated that he would like to have it released by his next birthday (21 April 2009).

On 11 October, the Cure performed 4:13 Dream in its entirety at a free performance in the Piazza San Giovanni in Rome that was recorded for the MTV Live concert series. The album's release date was delayed yet again, and was ultimately released on 27 October.

== Release ==
On 1 May 2008, the Cure posted a bulletin on their MySpace page in which they confirmed that the album would be released on 13 September.

On 16 July, Robert Smith announced that the album's release date would be pushed back to 13 October, and in September's place, an EP was released, entitled Hypnagogic States, containing remixes of the four singles from 4:13 Dream.

4:13 Dream was released on 28 October 2008. It debuted at No. 16 on the Billboard 200, selling about 24,000 copies in its first week of release.

=== Critical reception ===
Professional ratings
Aggregate scores
Source	Rating
AnyDecentMusic?	6.8/10
Metacritic	69/100
Review scores
Source	Rating
AllMusic	2/5 stars
The A.V. Club	B
The Guardian	4/5 stars
NME	8/10
Pitchfork	6.7/10
PopMatters	4/10
Q	3/5 stars
Rolling Stone	3.5/5 stars
Spin	3/5 stars
The Times	4/5 stars

4:13 Dream earned a score of 69 out of 100 on Metacritic, based on "generally favourable reviews". NME – which editor Mark Beaumont had just announced they will award the band 'godlike genius' title – praised it as a quintessential Cure record, Other journalists criticised the album's production and its overly comfortable and lightweight songwriting.

Evening Standard gave the album an 8.0 score and stated: "This is a big guitar record: the six-string blizzard of It's Over and the wah-wah squalls of Switch are particularly notable."

Barry Walters of Spin praised the album declaring it the "densest and most detailed effort ever. At times, it sounds as though a dozen or more simultaneous guitars are tangling with Smith’s iconic teased-hair tendrils, each one snarling and strumming and buzzing away at him as equally psychedelic vocal effects twist his familiar squeal into uncommon swirls." Walters added, "4:13 Dream is the rare Cure effort that takes a middle path neither dominated by dirges nor flooded in syrup," and said "no single cut announces itself as a Cure classic." but found "Underneath the Stars" as a highlight, comparing it to Disintegration. He felt the album was an improvement from the "overly heavy, underachieving self-titled punt," and concluded "Smith finally rewards long-time fans with a proper Cure album."

"4:13 Dream is one of the best Cure albums in years..." declared Classic Rock. "What's really impressive about The Cure in 2008 is how alive they sound. 4:13 is a schizophrenic beast, unconcerned with current trends or former glories, and hellbent on making mischief of expectations." Sean O'Neal of The A.V Club noted "while it's too familiar to be revelatory, it's invigorating all the same." and noted the funk sound brought by guitarist Porl Thompson, saying, "Smith sounds like he's clawing his way out of a self-pitying funk" and "it's good to know he still has some fight left."

== Post release ==
In April 2014, Robert Smith announced that the band would release an album called 4:14 Scream later that year, which would contain 14 of the outtakes from the 2007 recording sessions. Additionally, a limited-edition double album titled 4:26 Dream was also mooted, which would contain 26 non-album songs and/or remixes. To date, these albums of outtakes remain unreleased.

An official remix of "It's Over" by Smith, the "Whisper Mix", appears on the 2018 release of Torn Down.

In a 2024 interview on the BBC podcast Sidetracked with Annie and Nick, Smith has since shown regret and distaste towards the form in which the album was released saying, “It was nowhere near what I wanted it to be”. His plans of making it an "expansive" double album, which would've featured instrumental tracks, were disrupted by the record company insisting it should be condensed into a single album release. He described the original idea for the album as “like a fever dream" He feels as a single album its running time was too long and the compromises made to the album caused his perception of the music industry to become more negative, which he claims made him more reluctant to release new material.

== Track listing ==
All lyrics are written by Robert Smith; all music is composed by Smith, Simon Gallup, Jason Cooper, Porl Thompson.

No.	Title	Length
1.	"Underneath the Stars"	6:17
2.	"The Only One"	3:57
3.	"The Reasons Why"	4:35
4.	"Freakshow"	2:30
5.	"Sirensong"	2:22
6.	"The Real Snow White"	4:43
7.	"The Hungry Ghost"	4:29
8.	"Switch"	3:44
9.	"The Perfect Boy"	3:21
10.	"This. Here and Now. With You"	4:06
11.	"Sleep When I'm Dead"	3:51
12.	"The Scream"	4:37
13.	"It's Over"	4:16
Total length:		52:28

== Personnel ==
The Cure

- Robert Smith – vocals, guitar, six-string bass, keyboards, producer, mixing, engineering
- Porl Thompson – guitar
- Simon Gallup – bass
- Jason Cooper – drums, percussion, loops

Additional musicians

- Smud – extra percussion, programming
- Catsfield Sub Rhythm Trio – handclaps

Production

- Keith Uddin – producer, mixing, engineering
- Matt Hendry – assistant engineer
- Simon Wakeling – assistant engineer
- Daren Butler – studio assistant
- Brian Gardner – mastering

== Charts ==
Chart performance for 4:13 Dream
Chart (2008)	Peak position
Australian Albums (ARIA)	30
Austrian Albums (Ö3 Austria)	28
Belgian Albums (Ultratop Flanders)	23
Belgian Albums (Ultratop Wallonia)	10
Danish Albums (Hitlisten)	19
Dutch Albums (Album Top 100)	38
French Albums (SNEP)	8
German Albums (Offizielle Top 100)	21
Irish Albums (IRMA)	46
Italian Albums (FIMI)	8
New Zealand Albums (RMNZ)	32
Norwegian Albums (VG-lista)	17
Polish Albums (ZPAV)	9
Scottish Albums (Official Charts)	52
Spanish Albums (Promusicae)	13
Swedish Albums (Sverigetopplistan)	36
Swiss Albums (Schweizer Hitparade)	15
UK Albums (Official Charts)	33
US Billboard 200	16
US Top Alternative Albums (Billboard)	4
US Top Rock Albums (Billboard)	6
US Indie Store Album Sales (Billboard)	2

== Certifications and sales ==
Certifications and sales for 4:13 Dream
Region	Certification	Certified units/sales
Poland (ZPAV)	Gold	10,000^{*}
United States	—	97,000
^{*} Sales figures based on certification alone.
