= The Perfect Boy =

2008 single by The Cure

Single by the Cure

from the album 4:13 Dream
- A-side: "The Perfect Boy" (Mix 13)
- B-side: "Without You"
- Released: 12 August 2008
- Recorded: 2008
- Genre: Alternative rock
- Length: 3:21
- Label: Geffen
- Composers: Robert Smith, Simon Gallup, Jason Cooper, Porl Thompson
- Lyricist: Robert Smith
- Producers: Robert Smith, Keith Uddin

The Cure singles chronology
"Sleep When I'm Dead" (2008)	"The Perfect Boy" (2008)	"Want (Time Mix 2018)" (2018)

"The Perfect Boy" is a song by British band the Cure which was released on 13 August 2008 on Geffen Records in the United Kingdom and on 12 August in the United States to follow the tradition of releasing the singles on a Tuesday. It is the fourth and final single from the band's thirteenth studio album 4:13 Dream (2008).

The song debuted on 9 May in Fairfax, Virginia, on the band's first concert of their 4Tour's North American leg, and was played at all 27 shows. It is unrelated to the song "The Perfect Girl" from the band's seventh studio album Kiss Me, Kiss Me, Kiss Me (1987)

== Track listing ==
1. "The Perfect Boy" (Mix 13) – 3:23
2. "Without You" – 4:11

== Charts ==
Weekly chart performance for "The Perfect Boy"
Chart (2008)	Peak position
Australia (ARIA)	91
France (SNEP)	37
Germany (GfK)	86
Scottish Singles Sales (Official Charts)	14
Spain (Promusicae)	2
UK Singles (Official Charts)	78
