= The Cure: Trilogy =

2003 double live video album by the Cure

Trilogy: Live in the Tempodrom Berlin November 2002

Video by the Cure
- Released: 3 June 2003
- Length: 223 minutes
- Label: Eagle Vision (US); Fiction (UK)
- Director: Nick Wickham
- Producer: Robert Smith; Daryl Bamonte

The Cure chronology
Greatest Hits (2001)	Trilogy: Live in the Tempodrom Berlin November 2002 (2003)	Festival 2005 (2006)

The Cure: Trilogy (Live in the Tempodrom Berlin November 2002) is a double live album video by English rock band the Cure, released on two double layer DVD-9 discs, and later on a single Blu-ray disc. It documents The Trilogy Concerts, in which the three albums, Pornography (1982), Disintegration (1989) and Bloodflowers (2000) were played live in their entirety one after the other each night, the songs being played in the order in which they appeared on the albums. Trilogy was recorded on two consecutive nights, 11–12 November 2002, at the Tempodrom arena in Berlin. A third, previous Trilogy concert in Brussels on 7 November was not used.

Robert Smith is quoted on the sleeve about the "trilogy" concept and its eventual execution:

The albums Pornography, Disintegration and Bloodflowers are inextricably linked in so many ways, and the realisation of this Trilogy show is one of the highlights of my time in the Cure.

Smith began arranging the concerts days after seeing David Bowie's Heathen Tour concert at the Royal Festival Hall in London on 29 June 2002, when Bowie played 10 of the 11 Low tracks consecutively (though not in album order), and the whole of the Heathen album in order. It was, said Smith, "the best I'd seen him on stage for years and years".

The two DVDs feature a letterboxed 16:9 widescreen aspect ratio and a choice of Dolby Digital 5.1 surround sound or regular PCM stereo. Two interviews with the band are also included, though one is hidden and requires the specific manipulation of a DVD player's remote control to be accessed. Another hidden feature is the "mic cam", a camera mounted on Smith's microphone pole which, when accessed with the angle control buttons, shows him in a fish-eye view, singing.

The band's line-up for this production was Smith (vocals, guitar, 6-string bass guitar), Simon Gallup (4- and 6-string bass guitars), Perry Bamonte (guitar, 6-string bass, keyboards), Jason Cooper (drums, percussion) and Roger O'Donnell (keyboards, percussion). The songs performed were written by the band members, and, in the case of the first two albums, by former members Laurence "Lol" Tolhurst, Porl Thompson and Boris Williams.

The first DVD contains the Pornography and Disintegration sets, and the second consists of the Bloodflowers set, a short encore—"If Only Tonight We Could Sleep" and "The Kiss" from the album Kiss Me, Kiss Me, Kiss Me (1987)—and both interviews. Robert said that the two extra songs were included as a preview of "what was to come" in future Cure releases, despite later saying that the Trilogy concerts were supposed to be the Cure's swan song, though Smith has been notorious for saying such things in the past, usually coinciding with the release of new albums. In the two Trilogy shows at the Tempodrom a second encore was performed consisting of "M", "Play For Today" and "A Forest" the first night, and the same plus "Grinding Halt" and "Boys Don't Cry" the second night.

== Track listing ==
=== Disc 1 ===
- 1. "100 Seconds" (intro)

"Pornography"

- 2. "One Hundred Years"
- 3. "A Short Term Effect"
- 4. "The Hanging Garden"
- 5. "Siamese Twins"
- 6. "The Figurehead"
- 7. "A Strange Day"
- 8. "Cold"
- 9. "Pornography"

"Disintegration"

- 10. "Plainsong"
- 11. "Pictures of You"
- 12. "Closedown"
- 13. "Lovesong"
- 14. "Last Dance"
- 15. "Lullaby"
- 16. "Fascination Street"
- 17. "Prayers for Rain"
- 18. "The Same Deep Water as You"
- 19. "Disintegration"
- 20. "Homesick"
- 21. "Untitled"

=== Disc 2 ===
"Bloodflowers"

1. "Out of This World"
2. "Watching Me Fall"
3. "Where the Birds Always Sing"
4. "Maybe Someday"
5. "The Last Day of Summer"
6. "There Is No If..."
7. "The Loudest Sound"
8. "39"
9. "Bloodflowers"

Encore section

- 10. "If Only Tonight We Could Sleep"
- 11. "The Kiss"

== Personnel ==
- Robert Smith – vocals, guitar, 6-string bass
- Simon Gallup – bass guitar, 6-string bass
- Perry Bamonte – guitar, 6-string bass, keyboards
- Jason Cooper – drums, percussion
- Roger O'Donnell – keyboards, percussion

== Certifications ==
Region	Certification	Certified units/sales
Australia (ARIA)	Gold	7,500^{^}
United States (RIAA)	Platinum	100,000^{^}
^{^} Shipments figures based on certification alone.
