= Freakshow (The Cure song) =

2008 single by The Cure

Single by The Cure

from the album 4:13 Dream
- A-side: "Freakshow" (Mix 13)
- B-side: "All Kinds of Stuff"
- Released: 10 June 2008
- Recorded: 2008
- Genre: Funk rock; psychedelic rock; garage rock
- Length: 2:32
- Label: Geffen
- Composers: Robert Smith, Simon Gallup, Jason Cooper, Porl Thompson
- Lyricist: Robert Smith
- Producers: Robert Smith, Keith Uddin

The Cure singles chronology
"The Only One" (2008)	"Freakshow" (2008)	"Sleep When I'm Dead" (2008)

"Freakshow" is a single by English rock band the Cure which was released on 13 June 2008 on Geffen Records in the United Kingdom. In the United States, the single was released three days early, on 10 June because of the tradition of releasing songs on a Tuesday. It is the second single from the band's thirteenth album 4:13 Dream (2008).

The song debuted in Mexico City on 22 October 2007 under the title "Don't Say Anything".

== Reception ==
NME described the song as a "psychedelic funk-rocker" comparing it to Arctic Monkeys' second album Favourite Worst Nightmare (2007), saying "its barely restrained mania" was "both stripped-back and bold." Fliss Collier of God Is in the TV was less enthusiastic and dismissed it as "jazzy and funky in the worst notions of those words.", while Uncut's April Long said with its "modish, syncopated menace."and that it is "excellent enough to join the classic Cure canon."

Casey Boland of Slant observed "“Freakshow” is among 4:13 Dream’s odder moments. At first sounding like white-boy funk, the song serves as a welcome break from the album's more standard material. It also displays guitarist Porl Thompson as something of a secret weapon; with wild wah-wah-pedalled leads and a mountain of hulking open chords." Mike Schiller of Popmatters described the song as "a crazy little thing" "that unapologetically bounces around like a garage band song on which Robert Smith's oh-so identifiable vocal tics sound utterly at home."

Raoul Hernandez of The Austin Chronicle felt the song "reaches back to the band's late-1970s herk and jerk in its jaunty syncopation." Adrian Cepeda of Treblezine described the song as "a funky burst of energy recalling 1996's Wild Mood Swings. The freaky guitar riffs enhance the dream-state illusions of a damsel who's shattering his heart by slithering away a chance for true love." Daniela Reichert of the German issue of Rolling Stone felt it was "the most convincing" single released for the album, calling it the "slickest dance shit that we have heard from Smith since the singles with which he once freed himself from the "Pornography" nightmare.

== Track listing ==
1. "Freakshow (Mix 13)" – 2:32
2. "All Kinds of Stuff" – 3:13

Written by Cooper/Gallup/Smith/Thompson

== Charts ==
Weekly chart performance for "Freakshow"
Chart (2008)	Peak position
Australia (ARIA)	91
France (SNEP)	30
Scottish Singles Sales (Official Charts)	21
Spain (Promusicae)	1
UK Singles (Official Charts)	89
