= The Only One (The Cure song) =

2008 single by The Cure

Single by The Cure

from the album 4:13 Dream
- A-side: "The Only One" (Mix 13)
- B-side: "NY Trip"
- Released: 13 May 2008
- Genre: Alternative rock
- Length: 3:57
- Label: Geffen
- Composers: Robert Smith, Simon Gallup, Jason Cooper, Porl Thompson
- Lyricist: Robert Smith
- Producers: Robert Smith, Keith Uddin

The Cure singles chronology
"Taking Off" (2004)	"The Only One" (2008)	"Freakshow" (2008)

United States singles chronology
"alt.end" (2004)	"The Only One" (2008)	"Freakshow" (2008)

"The Only One" is a single by the British band The Cure which was released on 13 May 2008 on Geffen Records in the United Kingdom. The single was released in the United States on 20 May 2008. It is the first single from the band's thirteenth studio album 4:13 Dream (2008). The single was produced by Robert Smith and Keith Uddin, and peaked at No. 48 on the UK Single Charts.

It is the first single to be released by The Cure in over three and a half years — their last single being 2004's "Taking Off" / "alt.end".

== Background ==
The song debuted live on 7 October 2007 in Mountain View, California at a festival and was also played in Mexico City the next week. During that time, the song was known as "Please Project". It was not until early on in the European tour in early 2008 was "The Only One" established as the title.

The B-side, "NY Trip", does not appear on the album.

== Reception ==
In an early review on their website, Canadian music magazine Exclaim! describes the song as if it could have come from the sessions for the uplifting 1992 album Wish. They went on to add that Smith sounds "happier than ever" and that the song is a return to the form that produced many of their Top 40 hits.

The Observer described the song as having all the ingredients of a classic Cure song by having "lovely spiralling guitars, glowing bass and Robert Smith at his giddiest". Saying that the song sounds "like a pop single by The Cure", Pitchfork adds that the lyrics are not distinctive and goes on to say that the release will not make anyone forget the previous great singles from the band.

== Track listing ==
1. "The Only One (Mix 13)" – 3:57
2. "NY Trip" – 3:39

== Charts ==
Weekly chart performance for "The Only One"
Chart (2008)	Peak position
Australia (ARIA)	80
France (SNEP)	28
Netherlands (Single Top 100)	86
Scottish Singles Sales (Official Charts)	10
Spain (Promusicae)	1
UK Singles (Official Charts)	48
US Adult Alternative Airplay (Billboard)	23
US Alternative Airplay (Billboard)	31
