= Sleep When I'm Dead =

2008 single by The Cure

Single by The Cure

from the album 4:13 Dream
- A-side: "Sleep When I'm Dead" (Mix 13)
- B-side: "Down Under"
- Released: 13 July 2008
- Recorded: 2008
- Length: 3:51
- Label: Geffen
- Composers: Robert Smith, Simon Gallup, Jason Cooper, Porl Thompson
- Lyricist: Robert Smith
- Producers: Robert Smith, Keith Uddin

The Cure singles chronology
"Freakshow" (2008)	"Sleep When I'm Dead" (2008)	"The Perfect Boy" (2008)

"Sleep When I'm Dead" is a single by the British band The Cure released on 13 July 2008 on Geffen Records in the United Kingdom. It was pushed back to 15 July in the United States to comply with the tradition of releasing songs on a Tuesday. It has the distinction of including a keyboard part despite the fact that the band has not had a keyboardist in their lineup since 2005, although "The Only One" and "NY Trip" feature piano parts.

Robert Smith told Rolling Stone the song was originally written during sessions for the band's 1985 album The Head on the Door and had the working title of "Kat 8."

== Reception ==
Anthony Strutt of Penny Black Music "It has a weird ‘The Top’-like essence to it, and an almost prayer style vocal from Robert Smith. The guitar is quite soft, but is wah-wah flavoured, giving it that mid 80’s Cure feel, which is a good thing." and said that the B-side "Down Under" "is more laid back and reflective in tone, but also has that classic Cure sound."

God Is in the TV dismissed the song saying it "isn’t fit to lick the Doctor Marten boots of even the most dreadful songs from 1987’s Kiss me Kiss me Kiss me album, despite being written around that time and bearing all the generic low grind guitar menace, agitated vocals, and middle eastern jangle." Uncut said the song had a "sky-scraping, obsolescence-defying chorus", feeling it was "excellent enough to join the classic Cure canon."

== Track listing ==
1. "Sleep When I'm Dead (Mix 13)" – 3:51
2. "Down Under" – 3:05

Written by Cooper/Gallup/Smith/Thompson

== Charts ==
Weekly chart performance for "Sleep When I'm Dead"
Chart (2008–2009)	Peak position
Australia (ARIA)	84
France (SNEP)	36
Germany (GfK)	80
Scottish Singles Sales (Official Charts)	18
Spain (Promusicae)	1
UK Singles (Official Charts)	68
