= The Cure =

English rock band

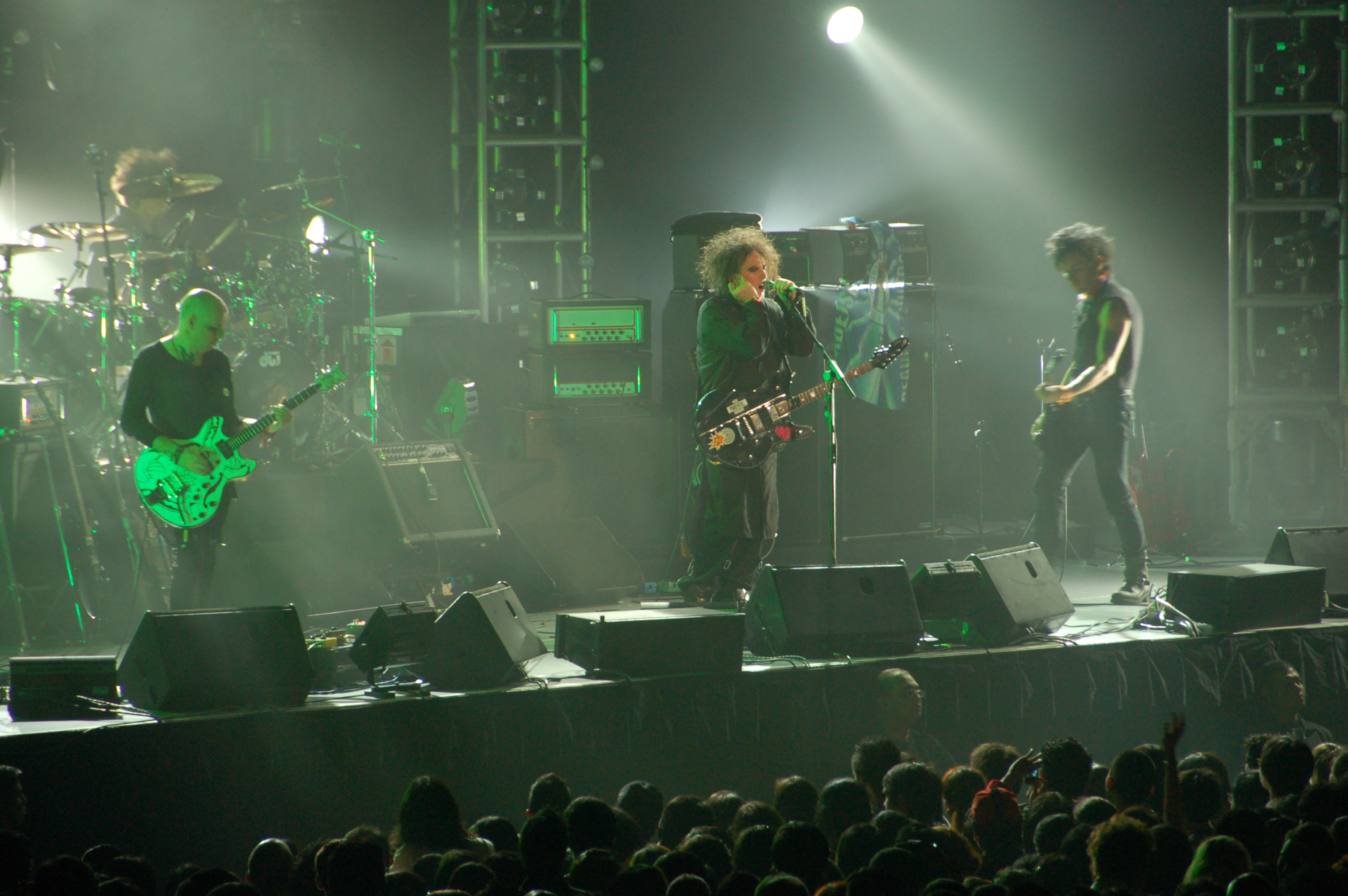
- The Cure performing in August 2007. From left to right: Jason Cooper, Porl Thompson, Robert Smith, and Simon Gallup

Background information
- Also known as: Malice (1976–1977); Easy Cure (1977–1978)
- Origin: Crawley, West Sussex, England
- Genres: Gothic rock; post-punk; alternative rock; new wave
- Works: Discography; songs
- Years active: 1976–present
- Labels: Fiction; Suretone; Geffen; Polydor; Hansa; A&M; Elektra; Asylum; Sire; Warner
- Spinoffs: The Glove; Fools Dance; Levinhurst; Babacar; Presence; COGASM
- Members: Robert Smith; Simon Gallup; Roger O'Donnell; Jason Cooper; Reeves Gabrels; Eden Gallup
- Past members: Michael Dempsey; Matthieu Hartley; Andy Anderson; Phil Thornalley; Lol Tolhurst; Boris Williams; Porl Thompson; Perry Bamonte
- Website: thecure.com

The Cure are an English rock band formed in Crawley in 1976 by Robert Smith (vocals, guitar) and Lol Tolhurst (drums). As of 2026, the band's line-up comprises Smith, Simon Gallup (bass), Roger O'Donnell (keyboards), Jason Cooper (drums), Reeves Gabrels (guitar), and Eden Gallup (guitar, keyboards). Smith has remained the only constant member throughout numerous line-up changes since the band's formation.

The Cure's 1979 debut album, Three Imaginary Boys, and several of their early singles placed the band at the forefront of the post-punk era that was gaining prominence in the United Kingdom. The band adopted an increasingly dark and tormented style beginning with their second album, Seventeen Seconds (1980), which culminated with the release of their fourth album, Pornography (1982) which had a strong influence on the emerging genre of gothic rock. Smith then started to introduce more pop into the band's music akin to new wave style. The Cure achieved mainstream success with the albums Kiss Me, Kiss Me, Kiss Me (1987), Disintegration (1989) and Wish (1992). The Cure's best-known songs include "Boys Don't Cry" (1979), "A Forest" (1980), "Close to Me" (1985), "Just Like Heaven" (1987), "Lovesong" (1989), and "Friday I'm in Love" (1992).

The Cure have released 14 studio albums and over 40 singles, selling more than 30 million records worldwide. They were inducted into the Rock and Roll Hall of Fame in 2019. Their 14th album, Songs of a Lost World (2024), was their first release of all-new material in 16 years and received widespread acclaim, topping the charts in multiple countries.

== History ==
=== 1973–1979: Formation and early years ===
The founding members of the Cure were school friends at Notre Dame Middle School in Crawley. They first performed in public at an end-of-year show in April 1973 as members of a one-off school band called Obelisk. That band consisted of Robert Smith on piano, Michael Dempsey on guitar, Lol Tolhurst on percussion, Marc Ceccagno on lead guitar, and Alan Hill on bass. In January 1976, while at St Wilfrid's Comprehensive School, Ceccagno formed a five-piece rock band with Smith on guitar and Dempsey on bass, along with two other school friends. They called themselves Malice and rehearsed David Bowie, Jimi Hendrix and Alex Harvey songs in a local church hall. By late April 1976, Ceccagno and the other two members had left, and Tolhurst (drums), Martin Creasy (vocals), and Porl Thompson (guitar) had joined the band. This lineup played all three of Malice's only documented live shows during December 1976. In January 1977, Creasy departed from the band. Increasingly influenced by the emergence of punk rock, Malice's remaining members became known as Easy Cure; this name was derived from a song written by Tolhurst.

After winning a talent competition, Easy Cure signed a recording contract with German record label Ariola-Hansa on 18 May 1977. In September 1977, Peter O'Toole (no relation to the actor), who had been the group's vocalist for several months, left the group to live on a kibbutz in Israel. The band auditioned several vocalists that month before Smith assumed the role. The new four-piece of Dempsey, Smith, Thompson, and Tolhurst recorded their first studio demo sessions as Easy Cure for Hansa at SAV Studios in London in October and November 1977. None were ever released.

The band continued to perform regularly around Crawley (including the Rocket, St Edward's, and Queen's Square in particular) throughout 1977 and 1978. On 19 February 1978 they were joined at the Rocket for the first time by a support band from Horley called Lockjaw, featuring bassist Simon Gallup. Hansa, dissatisfied with the group's demos, did not wish to release their original song "Killing an Arab". The label suggested that the band attempt cover versions instead. They refused, and by March 1978 Easy Cure's contract with the label had been dissolved. Smith later recalled, "We were very young. They just thought they could turn us into a teen group. They actually wanted us to do cover versions and we always refused."

On 22 April 1978, Easy Cure played their last gig at the Montefiore Institute Hall (in the Three Bridges neighbourhood of Crawley) before guitarist Porl Thompson was dropped from the lineup because his lead-guitar style was at odds with Smith's growing preference for minimalist songwriting. Smith soon renamed the remaining trio the Cure. Later that month the band recorded their first sessions as a trio at Chestnut Studios in Sussex, producing a demo tape for distribution to a dozen major record labels. The demo found its way to Polydor Records scout Chris Parry, who signed the Cure to his newly formed Fiction label – distributed by Polydor – in September 1978. The Cure released their debut single "Killing an Arab" in December 1978 on the Small Wonder label as a stopgap until Fiction finalised distribution arrangements with Polydor. "Killing an Arab" garnered both acclaim and controversy. While the single's provocative title led to accusations of racism, the song is based on French author Albert Camus's novel The Stranger. The band placed stickers that denied the racist connotations on the single's 1979 reissue on Fiction. An early NME article on the band wrote that the Cure "are like a breath of fresh suburban air on the capital's smog-ridden pub-and-club circuit," and noted: "With a John Peel session and more extensive London gigging on their immediate agenda, it remains to be seen whether the Cure can retain their refreshing joie de vivre."

The Cure released their debut album, Three Imaginary Boys, in May 1979. Because of the band's inexperience in the studio, Parry and engineer Mike Hedges took control of the recording. The band, particularly Smith, were unhappy with the album; in a 1987 interview, he admitted: "a lot of it was very superficial – I didn't even like it at the time. There were criticisms made that it was very lightweight, and I thought they were justified. Even when we'd made it, I wanted to do something that I thought had more substance to it." The band's second single, "Boys Don't Cry", was released in June.

The Cure then embarked as the support band for Siouxsie and the Banshees' Join Hands promotional tour of England, Northern Ireland, Scotland, and Wales between August and October. The tour saw Smith pull double-duty each night by performing with the Cure and as the guitarist with the Banshees when John McKay quit the group in Aberdeen. That musical experience had a strong impact on him: "On stage that first night with the Banshees, I was blown away by how powerful I felt playing that kind of music. It was so different to what we were doing with the Cure. Before that, I'd wanted us to be like the Buzzcocks or Elvis Costello; the punk Beatles. Being a Banshee really changed my attitude to what I was doing."

The Cure's third single, "Jumping Someone Else's Train", was released in October 1979. Soon afterwards, Dempsey was dropped from the band because of his cold reception to material Smith had written for the upcoming album. Dempsey joined the Associates, while Simon Gallup (bass) and Matthieu Hartley (keyboards) from the Magspies joined the Cure. The Associates toured as support band for the Cure and the Passions on the Future Pastimes Tour of England between November and December – all three bands were on the Fiction Records roster – with the new Cure line-up already performing a number of new songs for the projected second album. Meanwhile, a spin-off band comprising Smith, Tolhurst, Dempsey, Gallup, Hartley, and Thompson, with backing vocals from assorted family and friends and lead vocals provided by their local postman Frankie Bell, released a 7-inch single in December under the name Cult Hero.

=== 1980–1982: Early gothic phase ===
"One Hundred Years"
Sample of "One Hundred Years" from Pornography

Due to the band's lack of creative control on their first album, Smith exerted a greater influence on the recording of their second album, Seventeen Seconds, which he co-produced with Mike Hedges. The album was released in 1980 and reached number 20 on the UK charts. A single from the album, "A Forest", became the band's first UK hit single, reaching number 31 on the singles chart. The album was a departure from the Cure's sound up to that point, with Hedges describing it as "morose, atmospheric, very different to Three Imaginary Boys." In its review of Seventeen Seconds the NME said, "For a group as young as the Cure, it seems amazing that they have covered so much territory in such a brief time." At the same time, Smith became concerned about the concept of an alleged "anti-image". Smith told the press he was fed up with the anti-image association that some considered to be "elaborately disguising their plainness", stating, "We had to get away from that anti-image thing, which we didn't even create in the first place. And it seemed like we were trying to be more obscure. We just didn't like the standard rock thing. The whole thing really got out of hand." That same year Three Imaginary Boys was repackaged for the American market as Boys Don't Cry, with new artwork and a modified track list. The Cure set out on their first world tour to promote both releases. At the end of the tour, Matthieu Hartley left the band. Hartley said, "I realised that the group was heading towards suicidal, sombre music – the sort of thing that didn't interest me at all."

The band reconvened with Hedges to produce their third album, Faith (1981), which furthered the dour mood present on Seventeen Seconds. The album peaked at number 14 on the UK charts. Included with cassette copies of Faith was an instrumental soundtrack for Carnage Visors, an animated film shown in place of an opening act for the band's 1981 Picture Tour. In late 1981 the Cure released the non-album single "Charlotte Sometimes". By this point, the sombre mood of the music had a profound effect on the attitude of the band and they were "stuck in a ghoulish rut". Sometimes Smith would be so absorbed by the persona he projected onstage that he would leave at the end in tears.

In 1982 the Cure recorded and released Pornography, the third and final album of an "oppressively dispirited" trio that cemented the Cure's stature as one of the purveyors of the emerging gothic rock genre. Smith has said that during the recording of Pornography he was "undergoing a lot of mental stress. But it had nothing to do with the group, it just had to do with what I was like, my age and things. I think I got to my worst round about Pornography. Looking back and getting other people's opinions of what went on, I was a pretty monstrous sort of person at that time". Gallup described the album by saying, "Nihilism took over ... We sang 'It doesn't matter if we all die' and that is exactly what we thought at the time." Parry was concerned that the album did not have a hit song for radio play and instructed Smith and producer Phil Thornalley to polish the track "The Hanging Garden" for release as a single. Despite the concerns about the album's uncommercial sound, Pornography became the band's first UK Top 10 album, charting at number eight.

The release of Pornography was followed by the Fourteen Explicit Moments tour, in which the band finally dropped the anti-image angle and first adopted their signature look of big, towering hair, and smeared lipstick on their faces. Simon Gallup left the Cure at the tour's conclusion after a bar fight with Smith; the two did not talk to each other for the following eighteen months. Smith then placed the Cure on hold and rejoined Siouxsie and the Banshees as their lead guitarist in November 1982. He subsequently became a full-time member of that band, and was featured on the live video and album Nocturne. He then recorded the album Hyæna with them, but left the group two weeks before its June 1984 release to concentrate on the Cure.

=== 1983–1988: Commercial success ===
"Just Like Heaven"
Sample of "Just like Heaven" from Kiss Me, Kiss Me, Kiss Me

With Gallup's departure from the Cure and Smith's work with Siouxsie and the Banshees, rumours spread that the Cure had broken up. In December 1982, Smith remarked to Melody Maker, "Do the Cure really exist any more? I've been pondering that question myself ... it has got to a point where I don't fancy working in that format again." He added, "Whatever happens, it won't be me, Laurence and Simon together any more. I know that."

Parry was concerned about the state of his label's top band, and became convinced that the solution was for the Cure to reinvent its musical style. Parry managed to convince Smith and Tolhurst of the idea; Parry said, "It appealed to Robert because he wanted to destroy the Cure anyway." With Tolhurst now playing keyboards instead of drums, the duo released the single "Let's Go to Bed" in late 1982. While Smith wrote the single as a throwaway, "stupid" pop song to the press, it became a minor hit in the UK, reaching number 44 on the singles chart, and entered the Top 20 in Australia and New Zealand. It was followed in 1983 by two more successful songs: the synthesiser-based "The Walk" which reached number 12, and "The Love Cats", which became the band's first British Top 10 hit, reaching number seven. These singles and their B-sides were compiled on the Japanese Whispers compilation, which was released in December 1983.

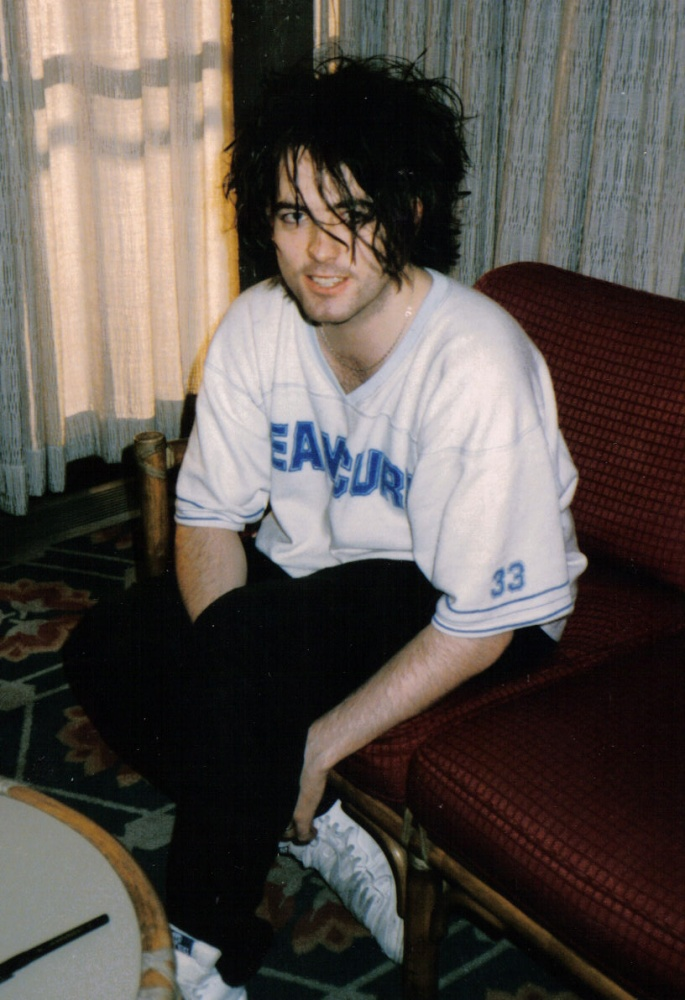
Smith in 1985

In 1984, the Cure released The Top, a generally psychedelic album on which Smith played most of the instruments except drums (played by Andy Anderson) and saxophone (played by early Malice member Porl Thompson, who then officially joined the Cure). The album was a Top 10 hit in the UK, and was their first studio album to crack the Billboard 200 in the US, reaching number 180. Melody Maker praised the album as "psychedelia that can't be dated", while pondering, "I've yet to meet anyone who can tell me why the Cure are having hits now of all times." The Cure then embarked on their worldwide Top Tour with Thompson and Anderson, along with Phil Thornalley who had produced Pornography and now became the band's bass player for live performances. Released in late 1984, the Cure's first live album, Concert, consisted of performances from this tour. Near the tour's end, Anderson was fired for destructive behaviour, and was temporarily replaced for a few shows by Vince Ely of the Psychedelic Furs. The drummer position was then officially filled by Boris Williams, who had previously been the touring drummer for Thompson Twins. Ely and Williams had both been recommended by Phil Thornalley, from his previous experiences as a producer and engineer. Soon thereafter, Thornalley also left because of the stress of touring. Former Cure bassist Simon Gallup, who had formed the band Fools Dance in the interim, rejoined the Cure after roadie Gary Biddles brokered a reconciliation between Gallup and Smith. Smith was ecstatic about Gallup's return and declared to Melody Maker, "It's a group again."

In 1985, the new line-up of Smith, Tolhurst, Gallup, Williams, and Thompson (now on guitar and keyboards) released The Head on the Door, an album that managed to bind together the optimistic and pessimistic aspects of the band's music between which they had previously shifted. The Head on the Door reached number seven in the UK and number 59 in the US, a success partly due to the international impact of the album's two singles, "In Between Days" and "Close to Me". Following the album and world tour, the band released the singles compilation Standing on a Beach in three formats (each with a different track listing and a specific title) in 1986, accompanied by a VHS and LaserDisc Staring at the Sea, which featured videos for each track on the compilation. This compilation made the US top 50, and saw the re-issue of three previous singles: "Boys Don't Cry" (in a new form), "Let's Go to Bed" and, later, "Charlotte Sometimes". The Cure toured to support the compilation and released a live concert VHS and LaserDisc of the show, filmed in the south of France and called The Cure in Orange. During this time, the band became very popular in Europe (particularly in France, Germany, and the Benelux countries) and increasingly popular in both the US and Canada.

The band kicked off 1987 by performing in Buenos Aires, Argentina, becoming one of the first British alternative rock bands to perform a large-scale concert there. The concert ended in a riot after fans who had purchased counterfeit tickets were denied entry to the venue. The Cure did not play in Argentina again until 2013.

In May, the Cure released the eclectic double album Kiss Me, Kiss Me, Kiss Me, which reached number six in the UK, the top 10 in several countries, and was the band's first entry into the US top 40 at number 35; the album was also certified platinum in the US. The album's third single, "Just Like Heaven", was the band's most successful single to date in the US, being their first to enter the Billboard Top 40. The album produced three other hit singles. After the album's release, the band recruited Roger O'Donnell, previously the touring keyboardist for the Psychedelic Furs and a longtime friend of Williams, to supplement the work of Tolhurst while allowing Thompson to focus on guitar. During the subsequent tour, Tolhurst's alcohol consumption began to interfere with his ability to perform.

=== 1989–1993: Disintegration and worldwide stardom ===
"Lovesong"
Sample of "Lovesong" from Disintegration

"Lullaby"
Sample of "Lullaby" from Disintegration

In 1989, the Cure returned to a darker form of music with the album Disintegration, which was critically praised and became their highest-charting album to date, entering at number three in the UK and featuring three Top 30 singles in the UK and Germany: "Lullaby", "Lovesong" and "Pictures of You". Disintegration also reached number 12 on the US charts. The first single in the US, "Fascination Street", was heavily played on American radio stations and reached number one on the Modern Rock chart, but was quickly overshadowed by its third US single, "Lovesong", which reached number two on the American Billboard Hot 100 chart (the only Cure single to reach the US Top 10). By 1992, Disintegration had sold over three million copies worldwide.

During the Disintegration sessions, the band gave Smith an ultimatum that either Tolhurst would have to leave the band or they would. In February 1989, Tolhurst's exit was made official and announced to the press; this resulted in O'Donnell becoming a full-fledged member of the band and left Smith as the Cure's only remaining founding member. Smith attributed Tolhurst's dismissal to an inability to exert himself and issues with alcohol, concluding, "He was out of step with everything. It had just become detrimental to everything we'd do." Because Tolhurst was still on the payroll during the recording of Disintegration, he is credited in the album's liner notes as playing "other instruments" and is listed as a co-writer of every song; however, it has since been revealed that while Tolhurst had contributed to the song "Homesick", his contributions to the rest of the album were minimal due to his alcoholism.

The Cure then embarked on a successful tour which saw the band playing stadiums in the US. On 6 September 1989, the Cure performed "Just Like Heaven" at the 1989 MTV Video Music Awards at the Universal Amphitheatre in Los Angeles. In May 1990, O'Donnell quit and was replaced by Perry Bamonte, who played both keyboards and guitar and had been a member of the band's road crew since 1984. That November, the Cure released a collection of remixes called Mixed Up. The one new song on the collection, "Never Enough", was released as a single. In 1991, the Cure were awarded the Brit Award for Best British Group. That same year, Tolhurst filed a lawsuit against Smith and Fiction Records over royalties payments and claimed that he and Smith jointly owned the name "The Cure"; the lawsuit finally ended in 1994 in favour of Smith. In the meantime, the band returned to the studio to record their next album. Wish (1992) reached number one in the UK and number two in the US and yielded the international hits "High" and "Friday I'm in Love". The album was also nominated for the Grammy Award for Best Alternative Music Album in 1993. In the autumn of 1993, the band released two live albums, Show and Paris, featuring recordings from concerts on their Wish world tour.

=== 1994–1998: Transition ===
In 1994, the band composed the original song "Burn" for the soundtrack to the movie The Crow, which went to number one on the Billboard 200 albums chart. Between the release of Wish and the start of sessions for the Cure's next studio album, the band's line-up shifted again. Porl Thompson left the band to tour with Page and Plant and was not replaced, while Boris Williams quit and was replaced by new drummer Jason Cooper (formerly of My Life Story). After a four-year absence, Roger O'Donnell returned to play keyboards. The sessions for their next album began in 1994 with only Robert Smith and Perry Bamonte present; Simon Gallup then returned from a health-related leave of absence, after which Cooper and O'Donnell joined the sessions.

Wild Mood Swings, finally released in 1996, was poorly received compared with previous albums and marked the end of the band's commercial peak. Early in 1996, the Cure played festivals in South America, followed by a world tour in support of the album. In 1997 the band released Galore, a compilation album containing all of their singles released between 1987 and 1997, as well as the new single "Wrong Number", which featured longtime David Bowie guitarist Reeves Gabrels. In 1998 the Cure contributed the song "More Than This" to the soundtrack for The X-Files film, as well as a cover of "World in My Eyes" for the Depeche Mode tribute album For the Masses.

"Out of This World"
Sample of "Out of This World" from Bloodflowers.

=== 1999–2005: The Trilogy and more personnel changes ===
With only one album left in their record contract and with commercial response to Wild Mood Swings and the Galore compilation lacklustre, Smith once again considered that the end of the Cure might be near and thus wanted to make an album that reflected the more serious side of the band. The Grammy-nominated album Bloodflowers was released in 2000 after being delayed since 1998. According to Smith, the album was the third of a trilogy along with Pornography and Disintegration. The band embarked on the nine-month Dream Tour, which included 20 dates in the United States. In 2001, the Cure left Fiction and released their Greatest Hits album and DVD, which featured the music videos for a number of their songs. The band released The Cure: Trilogy as a double live album video, on two double layer DVD-9 discs, and later on a single Blu-ray disc. It documents the Trilogy Concerts, in which the three albums – Pornography, Disintegration, and Bloodflowers – were played live in their entirety one after the other each night, the songs being played in the order in which they appeared on the albums. Trilogy was recorded on two consecutive nights, 11–12 November 2002, at the Tempodrom Arena in Berlin.

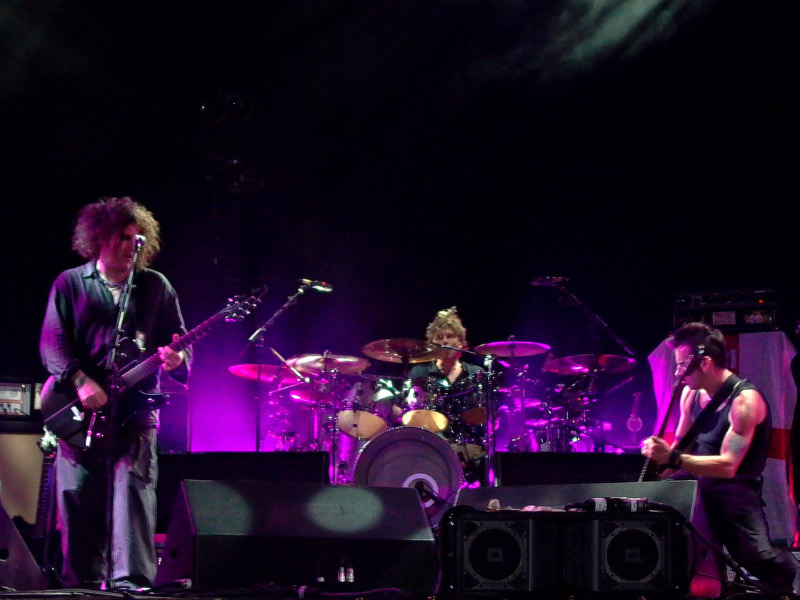
The Cure in concert in 2004. From left to right: Robert Smith, Jason Cooper, and Simon Gallup

In 2003, the Cure signed with Geffen Records. In 2004, they released a new four-disc boxed set on Fiction Records titled Join the Dots: B-Sides & Rarities, 1978–2001 (The Fiction Years). The album peaked at number 106 on the Billboard 200 albums chart. The band released their twelfth album, The Cure, on Geffen in 2004. It made a top ten debut on both sides of the Atlantic in July 2004. To promote the album, the band headlined the Coachella Valley Music and Arts Festival that May. From 24 July to 29 August, the Cure headlined the Curiosa concert tour of North America, which was formatted as a travelling festival and also featured Interpol, the Rapture, Mogwai, Muse, and Thursday, among other groups. While attendances were lower than expected, Curiosa was still one of the more successful American summer festivals of 2004. The same year the band was honoured with an MTV Icon award in a television special presented by Marilyn Manson.

In May 2005, O'Donnell and Bamonte were fired from the band. O'Donnell claims Smith informed him he was reducing the band to a three-piece. Previously O'Donnell said he had only found out about the band's upcoming tour dates via a fan site and added, "It was sad to find out after nearly twenty years the way I did, but then I should have expected no less or more." The remaining members of the band – Smith, Gallup and Cooper – made several appearances as a trio before Porl Thompson returned to the Cure's lineup for their summer 2005 tour. In July 2005, the band performed a set at the Paris concert of the Live 8 series of benefit concerts.

=== 2006–2018: 4:13 Dream and Reflections ===
The Cure began writing and recording material for their thirteenth album in 2006. The Cure postponed their autumn 2007 North American 4Tour in August to continue working on the album, rescheduling the dates for spring 2008. The group released four singles and an EP – "The Only One", "Freakshow", "Sleep When I'm Dead", "The Perfect Boy" and Hypnagogic States respectively – on or near to the 13th of each month, in the months leading up to the album's release. Released in October 2008, 4:13 Dream was a commercial failure in the UK compared to their previous album releases, only staying in the charts two weeks and not peaking higher than number 33. In February 2009, the Cure received the 2009 Shockwaves NME Award for Godlike Genius.

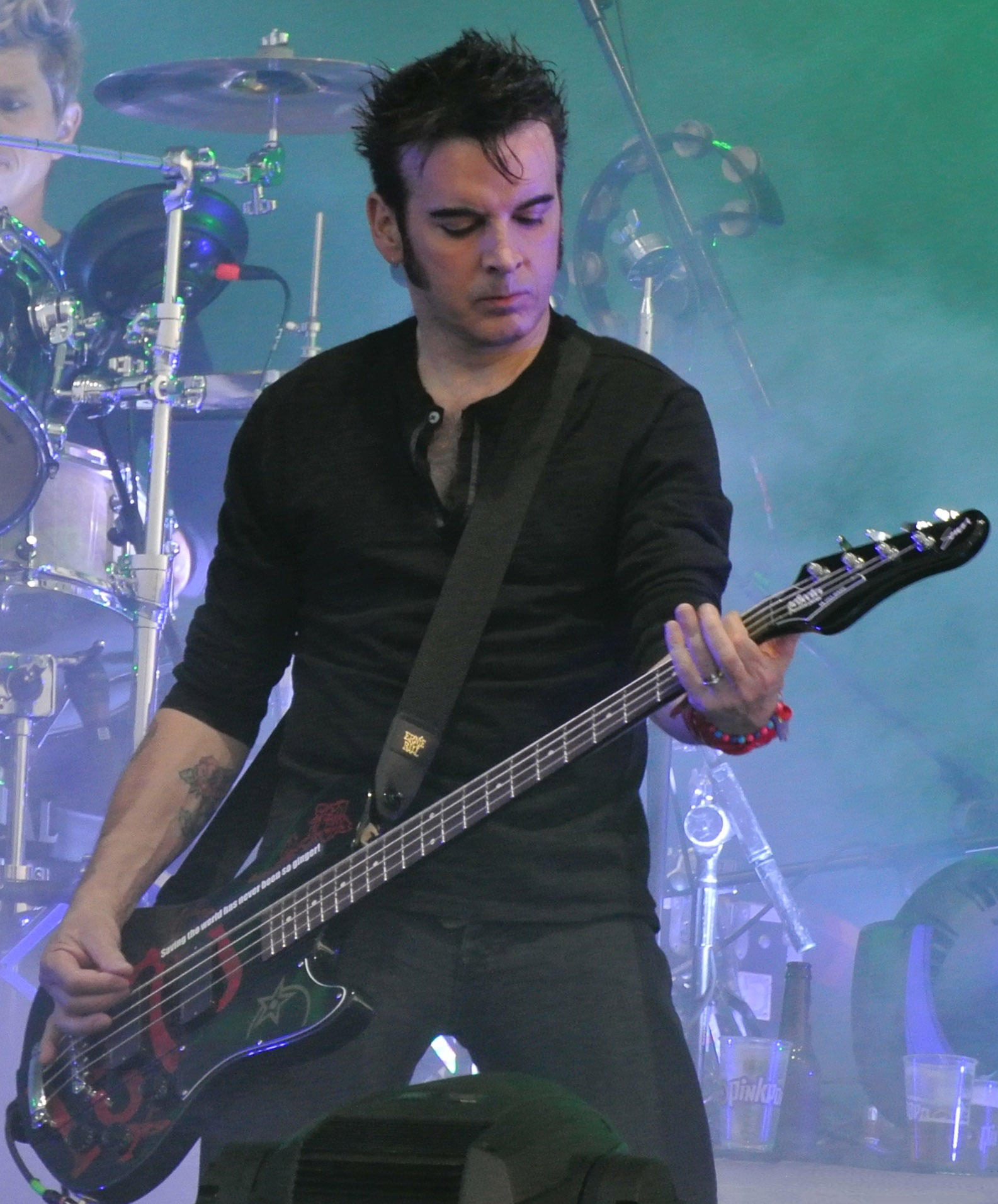
Bassist Simon Gallup in 2012.

O'Donnell officially rejoined the Cure in 2011 before the band performed at the Vivid Sydney festival in Australia. This concert was the first in their Reflections concert series, in which they performed their first three albums in their entireties. The band performed seven additional Reflections concerts in 2011, one in London, three in New York City and three in Los Angeles. On 27 September, the Cure was announced as a nominee for 2012 induction into the Rock and Roll Hall of Fame.

In NME's cover article for March 2012, the Cure announced that they would be headlining a series of summer music festivals across Europe, including the Leeds/Reading Festival. On 1 May, Porl Thompson announced that he had left the Cure for the second time. On 26 May, the Cure embarked on a 19-date summer festival tour of Europe, commencing at the Pinkpop Festival, joined by Reeves Gabrels on guitar. On the same day, it was announced that Gabrels would be standing in for the tour, but at that point was not a full-fledged member of the band. Several weeks into the tour, the band invited Gabrels to become a member and he accepted. In 2013, the Cure toured South America, where they had not performed since 1987 apart from two 1996 concerts in Brazil.

In early 2014, Smith announced that the band would release a follow-up to 4:13 Dream later that year titled 4:14 Scream. The releases would be compiled together as a double album named 4:26 Dream. However, this project was eventually abandoned. The Cure paid tribute to Paul McCartney on the album titled The Art of McCartney, which was released on 18 November 2014. The Cure covered the Beatles' song "Hello, Goodbye" which featured guest vocals and keyboards from Paul's son James McCartney. A video of the band and James performing the song was released on 9 September 2014; it was filmed at Brighton Electric Studio in Brighton. Robert Smith also covered McCartney's "C Moon" on the album's bonus disc. In the summer of 2015, the Disintegration track "Plainsong" was featured in a humorous moment in the movie Ant-Man, but did not appear on the movie's soundtrack.

In June 2018, the Cure headlined the 25th annual Meltdown Festival in London. Smith also selected the festival's lineup, which included several of his personal favourite artists, including Nine Inch Nails, My Bloody Valentine, Deftones, Placebo, Manic Street Preachers, and Kristin Hersh, among others. On 7 July 2018, Cure performed a 40th anniversary concert at Hyde Park as part of the British Summer Time concert series. For Record Store Day 2018, the Cure released a remastered, deluxe edition of Mixed Up, along with a sequel titled Torn Down featuring 16 new remixes all created by Robert Smith.

=== 2019–present: Songs of a Lost World ===
In a March 2019 interview with Rolling Stone, Smith revealed that the band recorded 19 songs, several of them lengthy, and planned to release an album later that year. He reiterated a 2019 release date in a subsequent July interview with NME, admitting that a few songs needed to be re-recorded in August. The year passed with no new studio release, as did the following four years.

The Cure embarked on a 23-date summer tour, consisting mostly of festival performances along with four dates in Sydney, Australia. The final Sydney show on 30 May was live-streamed. The band performed at the Austin City Limits Music Festival in October 2019. Later that same month, the band issued 40 Live: CURÆTION-25 + Anniversary, a Blu-ray, DVD and CD box set featuring their Meltdown and Hyde Park performances from 2018 in their entireties.

In interviews in June 2021, Smith referenced the recording of two new Cure albums, saying "One of them's very, very doom and gloom and the other one isn't," and that the recordings have been completed, "I just have to decide who's going to mix them." On 15 August 2021, bassist Simon Gallup posted on his social media that he had left the Cure. No official statement concerning his departure was made by Smith or the band and Gallup subsequently deleted the post. On 14 October 2021, Gallup confirmed that he was still in the band.

In March 2022, Smith confirmed that the first of the band's two projected new albums would be titled Songs of a Lost World. An update was provided in May 2022, when Smith claimed that the album would be released prior to the band's European tour in October 2022. This, however, did not happen, as the tour got underway with no new album being released, although new material was performed. Perry Bamonte returned to the band for their Lost World tour beginning with their 6 October 2022 concert in Riga, Latvia. In March 2023, the Cure announced a 30-date North American leg of the Shows of a Lost World tour, set to take place in May through July, the band's first full United States tour since 2016. Smith was outspoken against Ticketmaster's dynamic pricing model and ticket scalpers, setting base prices as low as $20 before fees; he also negotiated with the company to issue partial refunds to fans who were subjected to excessive fees above the list price.

The Cure released a 12-inch single on 1 October 2024 featuring live recordings of two new songs, "And Nothing Is Forever" and "I Can Never Say Goodbye", that were recorded at a concert in France in 2022.

In September 2024, the band began sending out cryptic postcard messages to fans who signed up for their mailing list along with a poster unveiled in a pub in Robert Smith's hometown where the band played some of their earliest shows. On 26 September, the first single from the album, "Alone", was released. The album was produced by Smith and Paul Corkett, who Smith previously worked with to produce Bloodflowers. Songs of a Lost World, their first studio album in sixteen years, was released on 1 November 2024. Songs of a Lost World reached number one on the UK Albums Chart, and was the Cure's first chart-topping album since Wish in 1992. In the United States, Songs of a Lost World debuted at number four on the Billboard 200, and was the band's first top ten album there since The Cure in 2004.

In October 2024, Smith suggested that the Cure would retire in 2029, the year he turns 70 and the 50th anniversary of their debut album, Three Imaginary Boys. A 24-track album, Mixes of a Lost World, was released in June 2025, featuring remixes of songs from Songs of a Lost World by artists including Chino Moreno, Trentemøller, and Paul Oakenfold.

Perry Bamonte died on 24 December 2025 at the age of 65 following a short illness.

At the 68th Annual Grammy Awards in February 2026, the Cure won their first Grammys, for Best Alternative Music Album for Songs of a Lost World and Best Alternative Music Performance for "Alone".

The Cure performed at the Primavera Sound festival in June 2026. During an interview with BBC Radio 6 Music in June 2026, Smith said the Cure were planning to release two new albums, with the first of them already finished.

Eden Gallup, Simon Gallup's son, had worked with The Cure as part of the band's crew, including serving as a bass technician for his father. In 2019, Simon Gallup was unable to perform at the Fuji Rock Festival in Japan and at Austin City Limits for personal reasons, and Eden Gallup filled in on bass. During The Cure's July 2026 Berlin Wuhiheide Park shows, Simon became ill shortly before the first concert and Eden moved from guitar to bass and performed the shows in his father's place. Eden Gallup officially joined The Cure at the Primavera Sound festival in Barcelona in June 2026. He performed at all the 32 summer shows in 2026. The biography section of the Cure's official website lists Eden Gallup as part of the Cure's 2026 band lineup.

== Musical style ==
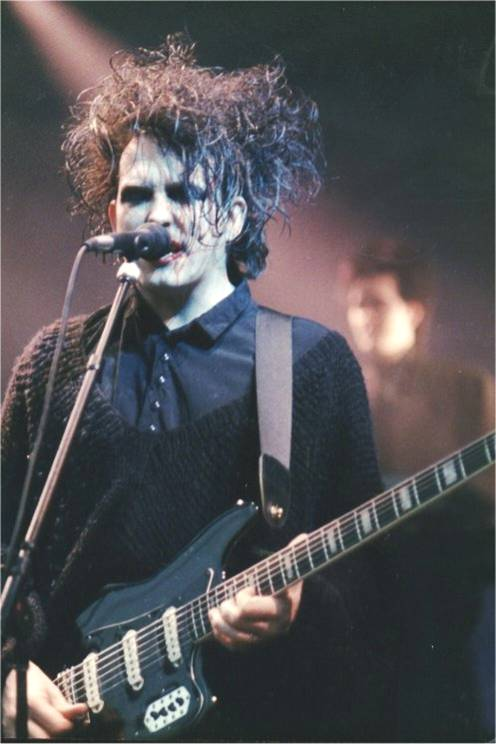
Robert Smith in 1989

The Cure are often identified with the gothic rock genre, and are viewed as one of the form's definitive bands. However, the band has routinely rejected classification, particularly as a gothic rock band. Robert Smith said in 2006, "It's so pitiful when 'goth' is still tagged onto the name The Cure", and added, "We're not categorisable. I suppose we were post-punk when we came out, but in total it's impossible ... I just play Cure music, whatever that is." While typically viewed as producers of dark and gloomy music, the Cure have also yielded a number of upbeat songs and been part of the new wave movement. Spin has said "the Cure have always been an either/or sort of band: either ... Robert Smith is wallowing in gothic sadness or he's licking sticky-sweet cotton-candy pop off his lipstick-stained fingers." In 2004, Smith observed, "It's always been paradoxical that it's pushed down people's throats that we're a goth band. Because, to the general public, we're not. To taxi drivers, I'm the bloke that sings 'Friday I'm in Love'. I'm not the bloke who sings 'Shake Dog Shake' or 'One Hundred Years'."

The Cure's primary musical traits have been listed as "dominant, melodic bass lines; whiny, strangulated vocals; and a lyric obsession with existential, almost literary despair." Most Cure songs start with Smith and Gallup writing the drum patterns and bass lines. Both record demos at home and then bring them into the studio for fine-tuning. Smith said in 1992, "I think when people talk about the 'Cure sound', they mean songs based on six-string bass, acoustic guitar and my voice, plus the string sound from the Solina." On top of this foundation is laid "towering layers of guitars and synthesisers". Keyboards have been a component of the band's sound since Seventeen Seconds, and their importance increased with their extensive use on Disintegration.

== Music videos ==
The band's early music videos have been described as "dreadful affairs" and have been maligned for their poor quality, particularly by the band itself. Tolhurst said, "Those videos were unmitigated disasters; we weren't actors and our personalities weren't coming across." The video for "Let's Go to Bed" was their first collaboration with Tim Pope. The director added a playful element to the band's videos; the director insisted in a 1987 Spin interview, "I think that side of them was always there, but was never brought out."

Pope would go on to direct the majority of the Cure's videos, which became synonymous with the band, and expanded their audience during the 1980s. Pope explained the appeal of working with the Cure by saying, "the Cure is the ultimate band for a filmmaker to work with because Robert Smith really understands the camera. His songs are so cinematic. I mean on one level there's this stupidity and humour, right, but beneath that there are all [Smith's] psychological obsessions and claustrophobia."

== Legacy ==
The Cure are often regarded as one of the most significant alternative artists of the 1980s. They were one of the first alternative bands to have chart and commercial success in an era before alternative rock had broken into the mainstream; in 1992, NME declared that the Cure had during the 1980s become "a goth hit machine (19 to date), an international phenomenon and, yet, the most successful alternative band that ever shuffled disconsolately about the earth". Pitchfork dubbed the Cure the "unlikeliest alt-rock heroes" of the 1980s.

The Cure have influenced a number of musical artists spanning multiple genres. Artists who have cited their influence by or appreciation for the Cure include Billy Corgan of the Smashing Pumpkins, Slowdive, Ride, My Bloody Valentine, Miki Berenyi of Lush, Britt Daniel of Spoon, Beach House, Chvrches, Blink-182, Interpol, Manic Street Preachers, AFI, Deftones, Placebo, Mogwai, Korn, Foals, Failure, Drab Majesty, Converge, Tim Kasher of Cursive, Geoff Rickly of Thursday, Olivia Rodrigo, Alvvays, and Brandon Flowers of the Killers.

The Rock and Roll Hall of Fame chose the Cure for induction in its Class of 2019. Although the Cure had been eligible for the Hall of Fame since 2004, they were only nominated once previously, in 2012. The formal induction ceremony was held 29 March 2019 at the Barclays Centre in Brooklyn, New York. The members named by the Rock Hall for induction as part of the band were Perry Bamonte, Jason Cooper, Michael Dempsey, Reeves Gabrels, Simon Gallup, Roger O'Donnell, Robert Smith, Porl Thompson, Lol Tolhurst, and Boris Williams. Gabrels was initially not included in the induction, but was added in February 2019. At the ceremony, the Cure were inducted by Trent Reznor before performing five songs.

The Cure's best-known songs include "Boys Don't Cry" (1979), "Close to Me" (1985), "Just Like Heaven" (1987), "Lovesong" (1989), and "Friday I'm In Love" (1992).

== Band members ==
- Robert Smith – vocals, guitars, six-string bass, keyboards (1976–present)
- Simon Gallup – bass guitar (1979–1982, 1984–present); keyboards (1980–1982, 1988–1992)
- Roger O'Donnell – keyboards (1987–1989 (touring); 1989–1990, 1995–2005, 2011–present); percussion (2003-2005, 2011–present)
- Jason Cooper – drums, percussion (1995–present)
- Reeves Gabrels – guitars, six-string bass (2012–present)

== Discography ==
- Three Imaginary Boys (1979)
- Seventeen Seconds (1980)
- Faith (1981)
- Pornography (1982)
- The Top (1984)
- The Head on the Door (1985)
- Kiss Me, Kiss Me, Kiss Me (1987)
- Disintegration (1989)
- Wish (1992)
- Wild Mood Swings (1996)
- Bloodflowers (2000)
- The Cure (2004)
- 4:13 Dream (2008)
- Songs of a Lost World (2024)

== Awards and nominations ==
At the Brit Awards, the British Phonographic Industry's (BPI) annual pop music awards, the Cure have won two awards from eight nominations (Best British Video for "Lullaby" in 1990, and Best British Group in 1991). They were nominated for three awards in 2025.

Year	Nominee / work	Award	Result
1990	"Lullaby"	British Video of the Year	Won
1991	"Close to Me"	British Video of the Year	Nominated
1991	The Cure	British Group	Won
1993	The Cure	British Group	Nominated
1993	"Friday I'm in Love"	British Video of the Year	Nominated
2025	Songs of a Lost World	British Album of the Year	Nominated
2025	The Cure	British Group	Nominated
2025	The Cure	Best Alternative/Rock Act	Nominated

The European Festivals Awards were established in 2009. They are voted for by the public via the European Festival Awards website and receive hundreds of thousands of votes annually.

Year	Nominee / work	Award	Result
2012	The Cure	Headliner of the Year	Nominated

The Grammy Awards are awarded annually by the Recording Academy of the United States for outstanding achievements in the music industry. Often considered the highest music honour, the awards were established in 1958.

Year	Nominee / work	Award	Result
1993	Wish	Best Alternative Music Album	Nominated
2001	Bloodflowers	Best Alternative Music Album	Nominated
2026	Songs of a Lost World	Best Alternative Music Album	Won
2026	"Alone"	Best Alternative Music Performance	Won

The Ivor Novello Awards are awarded for songwriting and composing. The awards, named after the Cardiff born entertainer Ivor Novello, are presented annually in London by the British Academy of Songwriters, Composers and Authors (BASCA).

Year	Nominee / work	Award	Result
1993	"Friday I'm In Love"	Best Contemporary Song	Nominated
2001	Robert Smith	International Achievement	Won
2022	Robert Smith and Simon Gallup	Music Icon Award	Won

The Juno Awards are presented annually to Canadian musical artists and bands to acknowledge their artistic and technical achievements in all aspects of music. New members of the Canadian Music Hall of Fame are also inducted as part of the awards ceremonies.

Year	Nominee / work	Award	Result
2005	"The End of the World"	Best Video	Nominated

The Los Premios MTV Latinoamérica is the Latin American version of the MTV Video Music Awards. It was established in 2002 to celebrate the top music videos of the year in Latin America and the world.

Year	Nominee / work	Award	Result
2007	The Cure	Influencia Award	Won

Lunas del Auditorio are sponsored by the National Auditorium in Mexico to honour the best live shows in the country.

Year	Nominee / work	Award	Result
2005	The Cure	Best Foreign Rock Artist	Nominated
2008	The Cure	Best Foreign Rock Artist	Nominated

The MTV Europe Music Awards were established in 1994 by MTV Networks Europe to celebrate the most popular music videos in Europe.

Year	Nominee / work	Award	Result
2004	"The End of the World"	Best Video	Nominated
2008	The Cure	Best Live Act	Nominated

The MTV Video Music Awards were established in the end of the summer of 1984 by MTV to celebrate the top music videos of the year.

Year	Nominee / work	Award	Result
1989	"Fascination Street"	Best Post-Modern Video	Nominated
1992	"Friday I'm In Love"	Viewer's Choice (Europe)	Won

The MVPA Awards are annually presented by a Los Angeles-based music trade organization to honour the year's best music videos.

Year	Nominee / work	Award	Result
2005	"The End of the World"	Best Alternative Video	Nominated
2005	"The End of the World"	Best Art Direction	Nominated

Music Television Awards

Year	Nominee / work	Award	Result
1992	Wish	Best Album	Nominated
1992	"High"	Best Video	Nominated
1992	Themselves	Best Group	Nominated
2004	Themselves	Best Group	Nominated
2004	Themselves	Best Alternative	Nominated
2004	"The End of the World"	Best Video	Nominated

The NME Awards were created by the magazine NME and first held in 1953.

Year	Nominee / work	Award	Result
2009	The Cure	Godlike Genius Award	Won
2009	4:13 Dream	Best Album Artwork	Nominated
2020	The Cure	Best Festival Headliner	Won

The Pollstar Concert Industry Awards is an annual award ceremony to honour artists and professionals in the concert industry. The Cure has been nominated seven times.

Year	Nominee / work	Award	Result
1985	Themselves	Which Artist is Most Likely to Successfully Headline Arenas for the First Time in 1985?	Nominated
1986	Themselves	Next Major Arena Headliner	Nominated
1987	Themselves	Next Major Arena Headliner	Nominated
1988	The Kissing Tour	Small Tour of the Year	Nominated
1990	The Prayer Tour	Most Creative Stage Production	Nominated
1990	Themselves	Surprise Hot Ticket of the Year	Nominated
1997	The Swing Tour	Most Creative Stage Production	Nominated

The Q Awards are the United Kingdom's annual music awards run by the music magazine Q to honour musical excellence. Winners are voted by readers of Q online, with others decided by a judging panel.

Year	Nominee / work	Award	Result
2003	The Cure	Q Inspiration Award	Won
2011	The Cure	Q's Greatest Act of the Last 25 Years	Nominated

UK Festival Awards

Year	Nominee / work	Award	Result	Ref.
2012	The Cure	Best Headline Performance	Nominated	

Žebřík Music Awards

Year	Nominee / work	Award	Result	Ref.
1996	The Cure	Best International Enjoyment	Nominated	
2004	The Cure	Best International Album	Nominated	

== See also ==
- List of British Grammy winners and nominees

== Cited sources ==
- Apter, Jeff (2006). Never Enough: The Story of The Cure. Omnibus Press. ISBN 1-84449-827-1.

=== Further reading ===
- Barbarian, L.; Sutherland, Steve; Smith, Robert (1988). Ten Imaginary Years. Zomba Books. ISBN 0-946391-87-4.
- Carman, Richard (2005). Robert Smith: "The Cure" and Wishful Thinking. Independent Music Press (UK). ISBN 978-0-9549704-1-3.
- Thompson, Dave; Greene, Jo-Ann (1988). The Cure: A Visual Documentary. Omnibus Press. ISBN 0-7119-1387-0.
- Hopkins, S.; Smith, Robert; Foo, T. (1989). The Cure: Songwords 1978–1989. Omnibus Press. ISBN 0-7119-1951-8.
- Nuzzolo, Massimiliano (April 2004). The latest album by The Cure (L'ultimo disco dei Cure). Sironi Publishing. ISBN 88-518-0027-8.
- Thompson, Dave (October 2005). In Between Days: An Armchair Guide to The Cure. Helter Skelter Publishing. ISBN 1-905139-00-4.
