= The Cure (The Cure album) =

2004 studio album by the Cure

Studio album by the Cure
- Released: 25 June 2004
- Recorded: 2003–2004
- Studio: Olympic (London)
- Genre: Alternative rock; indie rock
- Length: 71:13
- Label: I Am; Geffen
- Producer: Ross Robinson; Robert Smith

The Cure chronology
Join the Dots (2004)	The Cure (2004)	4:13 Dream (2008)

Singles from The Cure
- 1. "The End of the World" Released: 19 July 2004; 2. "Taking Off" Released: 18 October 2004; 3. "alt.end" Released: 2004 (U.S. only)

The Cure is the twelfth studio album by the English rock band of the same name, released on 25 June 2004. It would be the band's first studio album released on Geffen Records. The album was entirely co-produced by American producer Ross Robinson and frontman Robert Smith and spawned the single "The End of the World". It is the band's final studio album with guitarist Perry Bamonte prior to his death in 2025.

== Production and content ==
Robinson had previously worked with rock and heavy metal bands such as Korn, Limp Bizkit, Slipknot, At the Drive-In, Glassjaw and the Blood Brothers. This may have contributed to the songs on the album being heavier than previous material by the band. Smith described the record as "Cure heavy", as opposed to "new-metal heavy".

Robinson said The Cure's usual process was to first create the music and Smith would later bring the lyrics. He said he encouraged Smith to write the lyrics first instead. That way the rest of the band could put the feeling expressed into the music they played.

Twenty songs were created during the recording sessions. However, Robinson suggested a different sequencing; Smith explained:

"We did twenty songs in total. There's fifteen being released in this first wave, and three of the five being left off are the most depressing songs we've ever done. Ross Robinson is beside himself with anguish that I've left them off the album. The running order that Ross came up with was an eight-song album of all the big, dark, dismal songs. Then I put together my running order and we played them back-to-back, and I just preferred mine. The fact is, I make the decisions."

Robinson insisted on the group playing together while recording songs, like a live experience. Bassist Simon Gallup did not enjoy working with Robinson, believing that he was "contriving to be eccentric".

"I thought he tried to do things so everybody thought he was eccentric where true eccentrics don’t try to create a persona around them. He would just do, to my mind, things that were unnecessary. He'd say, 'Oh, I'm trying to get a sound like, so it sounds like...' for example, he would pick up my bass, and I'd say, 'Hey, what are you doing?' and he'd say, 'I'm just trying to get the sound so it sounds like your bass,' and I said, 'Well, I know how to get that sound.' There’s more convoluted ways of doing it than trying to create a sound, why not just ask the person who's playing it?"

According to the liner notes, the entire album was recorded live in the studio. Smith said the official track listing includes the closing "Going Nowhere", which was excluded from North American pressings.

The artwork was designed by Smith's nephews and nieces: children who were unaware that their drawings were to be put on the album. The drawings were supposed to be of a 'good dream' and a 'bad dream' from each niece and nephew. Smith compiled the best drawings on the album and then produced it.

Robert Smith said in 2024 in an interview with BBC Radio 6 Music presenter Matt Everitt that the album was his least favourite: "The Cure album is probably my least favourite album that we’ve made. I don't like some of it, it's the only album that I don’t think works." but also said his favourite song from the album was "Before Three".

== Promotion ==
The Cure is the first record by the band released by producer Ross Robinson's I Am label, with whom the Cure signed a three-album deal. To promote the album, the band appeared at several festivals in Europe and the United States in spring 2004. They also premièred the song "The End of the World" on The Tonight Show with Jay Leno. In the summer of 2004, the band launched the Curiosa festival, where they performed shows across the United States with a number of bands who have been inspired by the Cure, including Mogwai, Interpol and Muse. The band then performed in Mexico, followed by additional festivals and televised performances in Europe, culminating with the end of 2004. By the end of the year, every song from The Cure had been performed live by the band.

== Release ==
The Cure was first released in Japan on 25 June 2004. It was then released in the UK and Europe on 28 June and then in the US the day after. It debuted at No. 7 in the United States, selling 91,000 copies in its first week of release, and No. 8 in the United Kingdom.

Initial pressings included a bonus DVD containing a documentary of the conception of three songs from the album, titled Making 'The Cure'.

Demos of three songs recorded during the album's sessions, titled "A Boy I Never Knew", "Please Come Home" and "Strum", have leaked as MP3 files.

== Reception ==
Professional ratings
Aggregate scores
Source	Rating
Metacritic	75/100
Review scores
Source	Rating
AllMusic	3/5 stars
Entertainment Weekly	B
The Guardian	4/5 stars
The Independent	2/5 stars
Mojo	3/5 stars
NME	8/10
Pitchfork	7.7/10
Q	3/5 stars
Rolling Stone	4/5 stars
Spin	B

Critical response to The Cure has been generally positive. Metacritic calculated the weighted average score given to The Cure at 75 out of 100. Adam Sweeting of The Guardian described it as a "masterful performance all round", highlighting the songs "The End of the World", "Going Nowhere", "Anniversary" and "The Promise". Rob Fitzpatrick of NME described it as "startling from the first listen. " Rob Sheffield of Rolling Stone wrote "it's the grooviest thing, it's a perfect dream", and pointed out the album's highlights as being "Before Three", "Lost" and "(I Don't Know What's Going) On". While stating that "as with Prince on Musicology, Smith allows the Cure's current lineup to become his own tribute band", David Browne of Entertainment Weekly nonetheless concluded that the "newly vibrant music looks back lovingly as well on a time when Cure songs managed to combine a throbbing, oingo-boingo springiness with the depressive angst of suburban-basement isolation".

AllMusic's Stephen Thomas Erlewine was mixed in his review of The Cure, qualifying it as "the type of record that sits on the shelves of diehard fans, only occasionally making its way on the stereo". Andy Greenwald of Blender felt that the band "come off more than ever like a caricature", writing: "There are a few breaks of sunlight, including the single 'The End of the World' and 'Taking Off', a strummy echo of 1992's chart-topping Wish. After that, it's right back into the abyss." The Independent's Andy Gill panned the album as being "just as stunted musically as emotionally, the bleak chordings and grey washes barely differing throughout, whatever an individual song's outlook."

== Track listing ==
All lyrics written by Robert Smith; all music by the Cure (Smith, Perry Bamonte, Simon Gallup, Jason Cooper and Roger O'Donnell).

No.	Title	Length
1.	"Lost"	4:07
2.	"Labyrinth"	5:14
3.	"Before Three"	4:40
4.	"Truth Goodness and Beauty" (excluded from North American, Brazilian and some European pressings)	4:20
5.	"The End of the World"	3:44
6.	"Anniversary"	4:22
7.	"Us or Them"	4:09
8.	"Fake" (Japanese edition only)	4:43
9.	"alt.end"	4:30
10.	"(I Don't Know What's Going) On"	2:57
11.	"Taking Off"	3:19
12.	"Never"	4:04
13.	"The Promise"	10:21
14.	"Going Nowhere" (excluded from North American pressings)	3:28
Total length:		63:58

Vinyl-only bonus track
No.	Title	Length
15.	"This Morning"	7:15
Total length:		71:13

Bonus DVD

1. "Back On" (instrumental version of "Lost")
2. "The Broken Promise" (instrumental version of "The Promise")
3. "Someone's Coming" (alternate version of "Truth Goodness and Beauty")

== Personnel ==
The Cure

- Robert Smith – vocals, guitar, production
- Perry Bamonte – guitar
- Simon Gallup – bass guitar
- Jason Cooper – drums
- Roger O'Donnell – keyboards

Production

- Ross Robinson – producer
- Steve Evetts – engineer, mixing

== Charts ==
Chart performance for The Cure
Chart (2004)	Peak position
Australian Albums (ARIA)	28
Austrian Albums (Ö3 Austria)	12
Belgian Albums (Ultratop Flanders)	7
Belgian Albums (Ultratop Wallonia)	4
Czech Albums (ČNS IFPI)	21
Danish Albums (Hitlisten)	6
Dutch Albums (Album Top 100)	37
European Albums (Billboard)	1
Finnish Albums (Suomen virallinen lista)	18
French Albums (SNEP)	4
German Albums (Offizielle Top 100)	3
Greek Albums (IFPI)	12
Irish Albums (IRMA)	18
Italian Albums (FIMI)	2
New Zealand Albums (RMNZ)	32
Norwegian Albums (VG-lista)	10
Polish Albums (ZPAV)	9
Portuguese Albums (AFP)	18
Scottish Albums (OCC)	11
Spanish Albums (AFYVE)	5
Swedish Albums (Sverigetopplistan)	10
Swiss Albums (Schweizer Hitparade)	5
UK Albums (OCC)	8
US Billboard 200	7

== Certifications and sales ==
Certifications and sales for The Cure
Region	Certification	Certified units/sales
United Kingdom (BPI)	Silver	60,000^{^}
United States	—	317,000
^{^} Shipments figures based on certification alone.
