= List of songs recorded by the Cure =

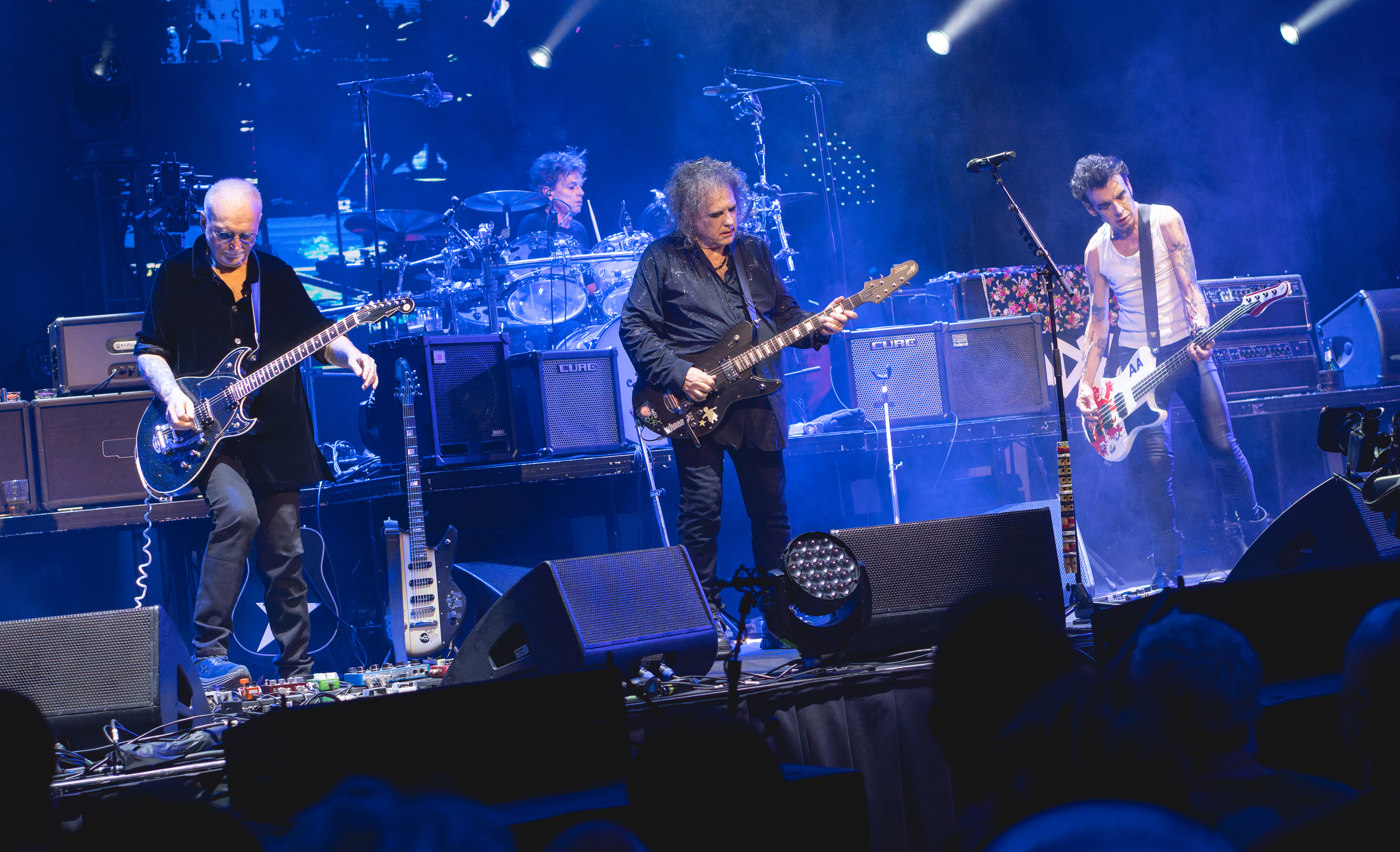
The Cure performing in 2024

The Cure are an English rock band who have recorded over 270 songs since their formation in 1976. Throughout their history, the band have gone through several lineup changes, with main songwriter and frontman Robert Smith remaining the only constant member. The band originated as part of the UK post-punk and new wave movements of the late 1970s, particularly with their debut album Three Imaginary Boys (1979) and its accompanying singles, including "Boys Don't Cry". With their second album, Seventeen Seconds, the band's sound became more experimental, and is recognised as an early example of gothic rock. Britannica writes that the Cure adopted their "signature sound" on the album—"minimalist instrumentation marked by heavy, pulsing bass lines and warbling, sometimes frantic, single-noted guitar progressions". The band continued this gloomy sound on the following albums Faith (1981) and Pornography (1982), the latter introducing "grand, sweeping, synthesiser progressions" that would characterise their later albums. In 1983, the band released the compilation album Japanese Whispers, which collected several of the group's recent non-album singles, including "Let's Go to Bed", "The Walk" and "The Love Cats". The band explored psychedelia on 1984's The Top.

In 1985, the Cure released The Head on the Door, a pop-oriented record that featured hits such as "In Between Days" and "Close to Me". The double album Kiss Me, Kiss Me, Kiss Me followed in 1987, featuring an eclectic mix of songs that culminated the group's material up to that point: "part post-punk delirium, part gothic brooding and part alt-rock brightness". Featuring "Why Can't I Be You?", "Hot Hot Hot!!!" and "Just Like Heaven", its lyrics cover topics such as love and lust. In 1989, the band released Disintegration, a return to the dark and gloomy soundscapes of their earlier work. With tracks such as "Plainsong", "Fascination Street", "Lullaby" and "Pictures of You", the album is characterised by a significant usage of synthesizers and keyboards, slow, "droning" guitar progressions and Smith's introspective vocals. 1990's Mixed Up compiled various remixes and a new song, "Never Enough". On 1992's Wish, the band's songs became more guitar-driven and accessible, notably on the hit "Friday I'm in Love", while maintaining the dreary lyrics that characterised Disintegration.

Wild Mood Swings (1996) featured an eclectic mix of lighter, pop songs with darker, introspective material. In 1997, the Cure released Galore: The Singles 1987–1997, which compiled their singles from 1987 to 1997, with a new song, "Wrong Number". The band returned to a gothic sound and melancholic lyrics akin to Pornography and Disintegration for 2000's Bloodflowers. In 2004, the band released Join the Dots, a box set featuring rare songs from their back catalogue, including covers and material the band recorded for soundtrack albums, including Judge Dredd, The Crow and The X-Files. The same year, they released their self-titled twelfth album, which Smith said was heavier than the band's previous material. This was followed by 4:13 Dream (2008), which combines pop music with lyrics about angst. In 2024, the band released Songs of a Lost World, their first album of new material in 16 years. It is a dark record with personal lyrics about mortality.

== Songs ==
Key
†	Indicates songs written by others
‡	Indicates demo recording
#	Indicates instrumental recording

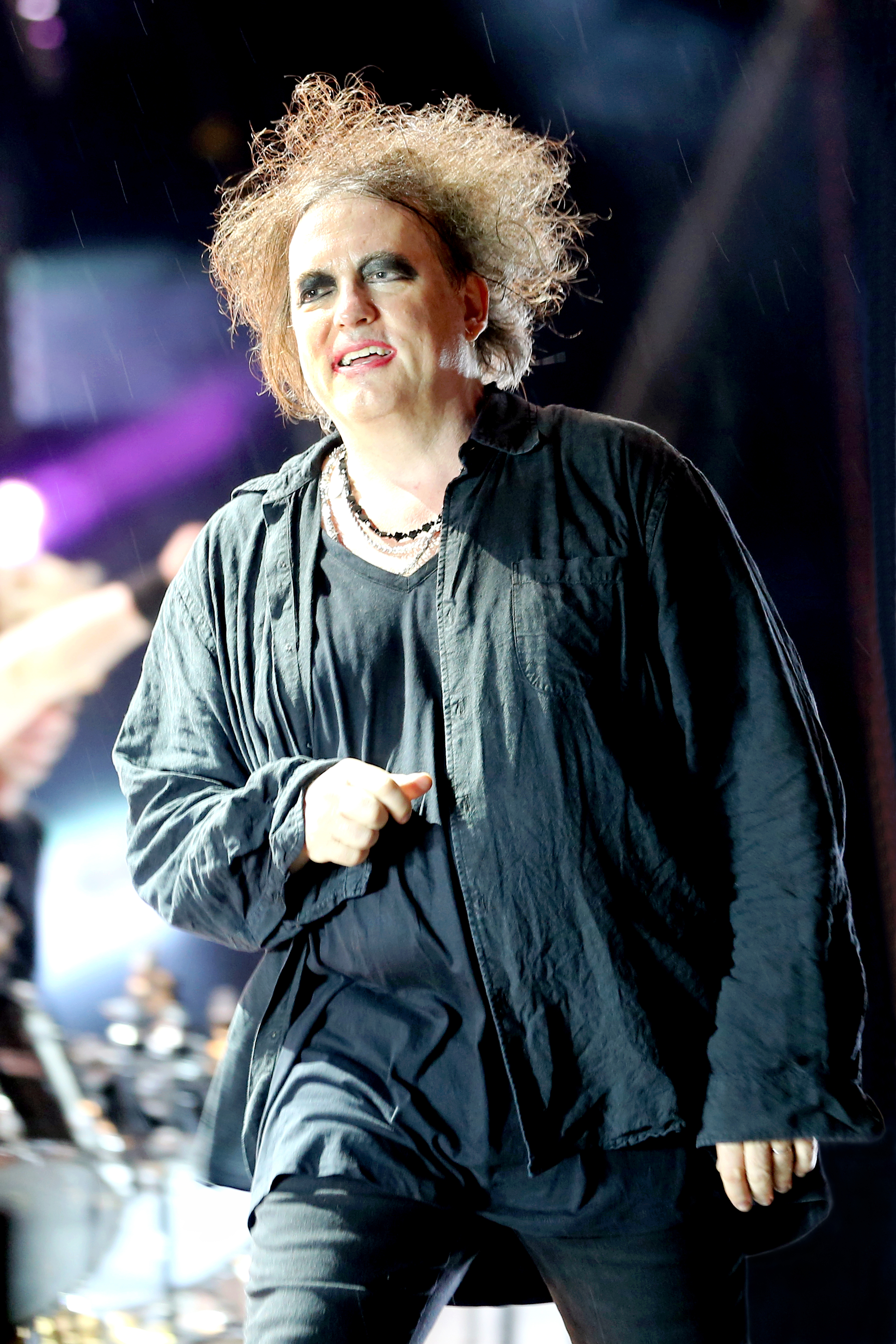
Robert Smith is the Cure's frontman, primary songwriter and sole constant member.

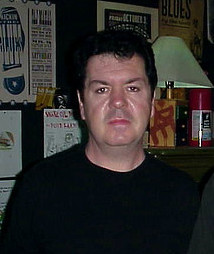
Lol Tolhurst co-founded the Cure with Smith and played drums with them until 1989.

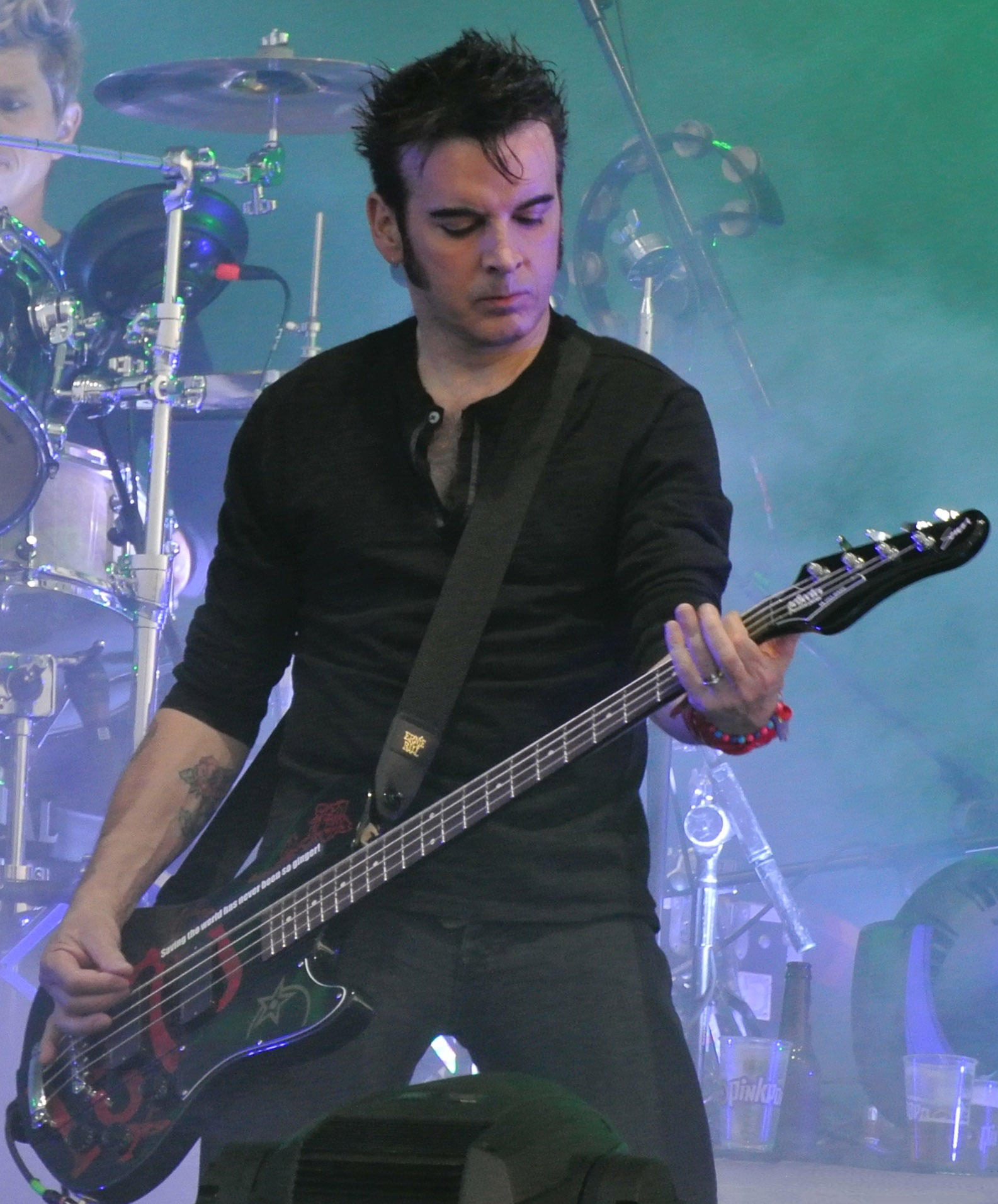
Simon Gallup is the band's bassist and the second longest-serving member of the group, after Smith.

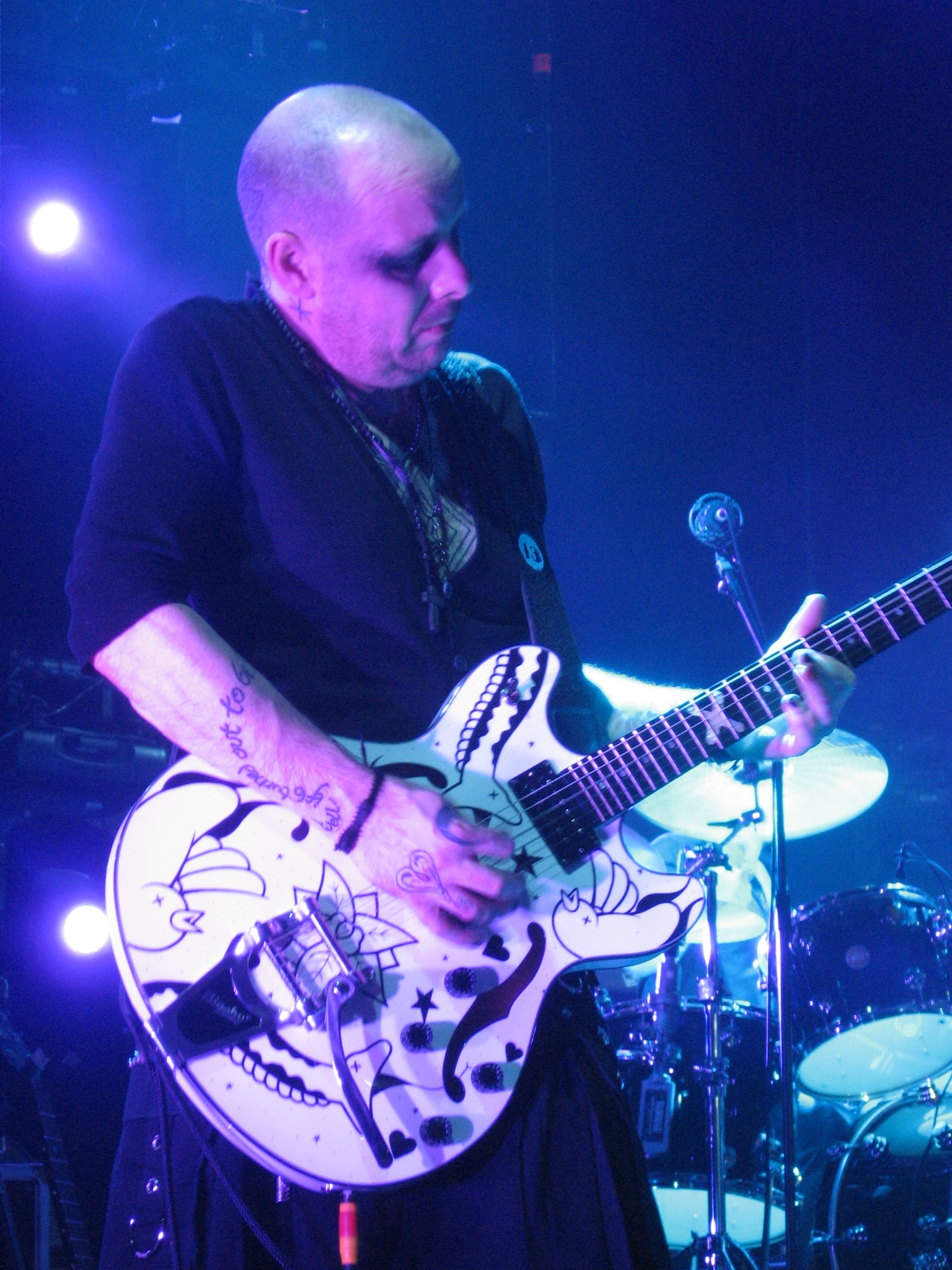
Porl Thompson was a member of the Cure from 1983 to 1993 and again from 2005 to 2011.

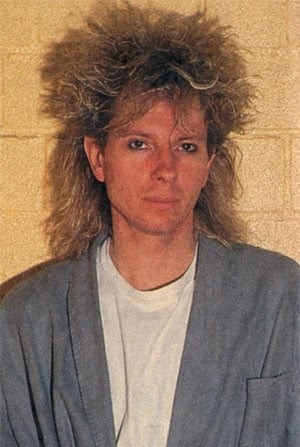
Boris Williams was the band's drummer from 1984 to 1994.

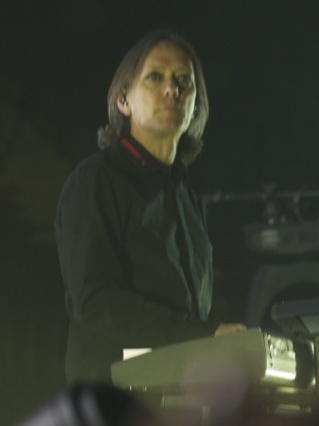
Roger O'Donnell is the band's current keyboardist.

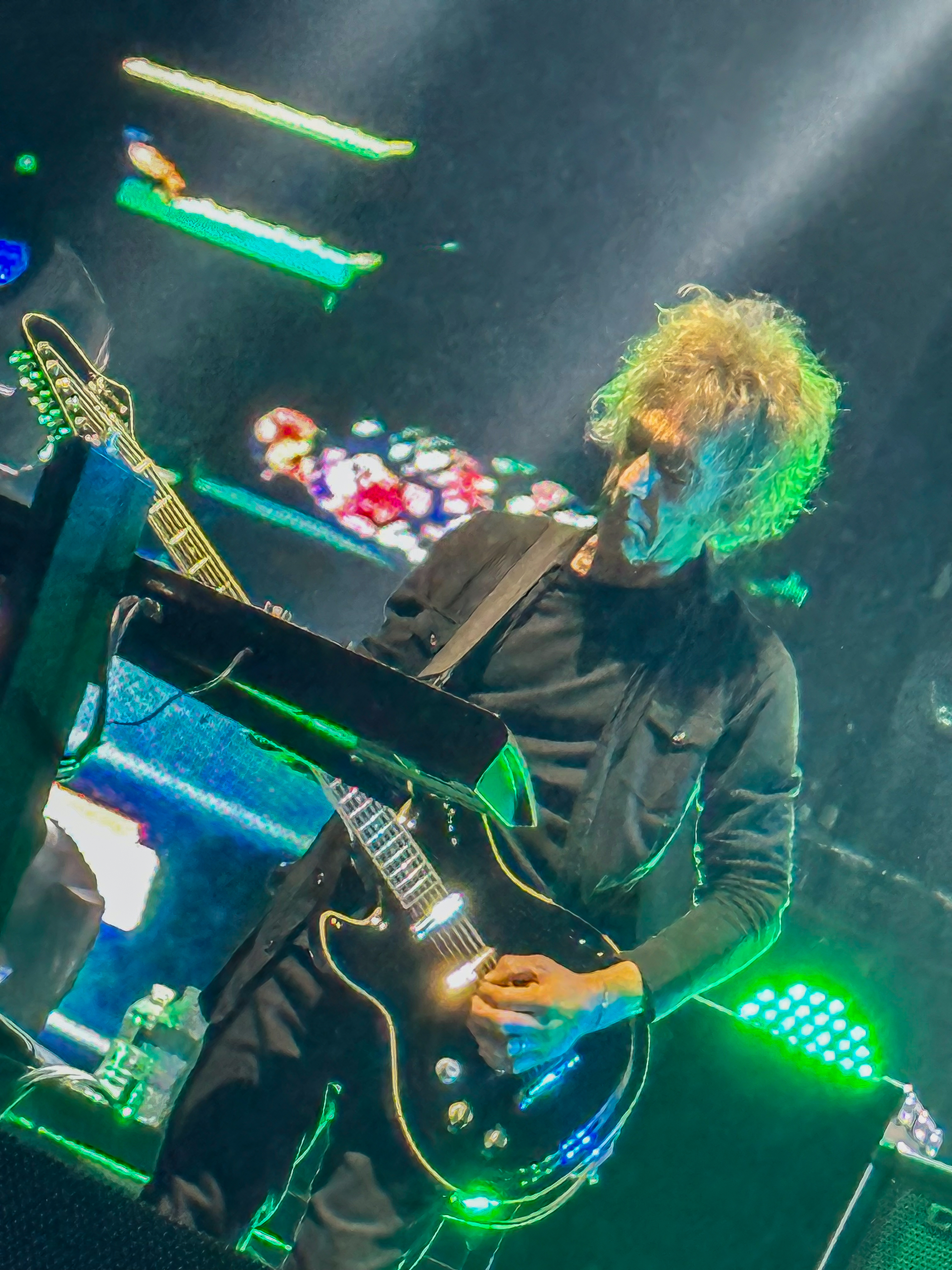
Perry Bamonte was the band's guitarist and keyboardist from 1990 to 2005, and again from 2022 to 2025.

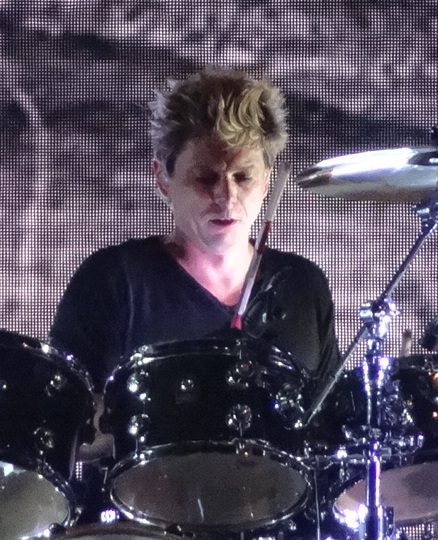
Jason Cooper has been the Cure's drummer since 1995.

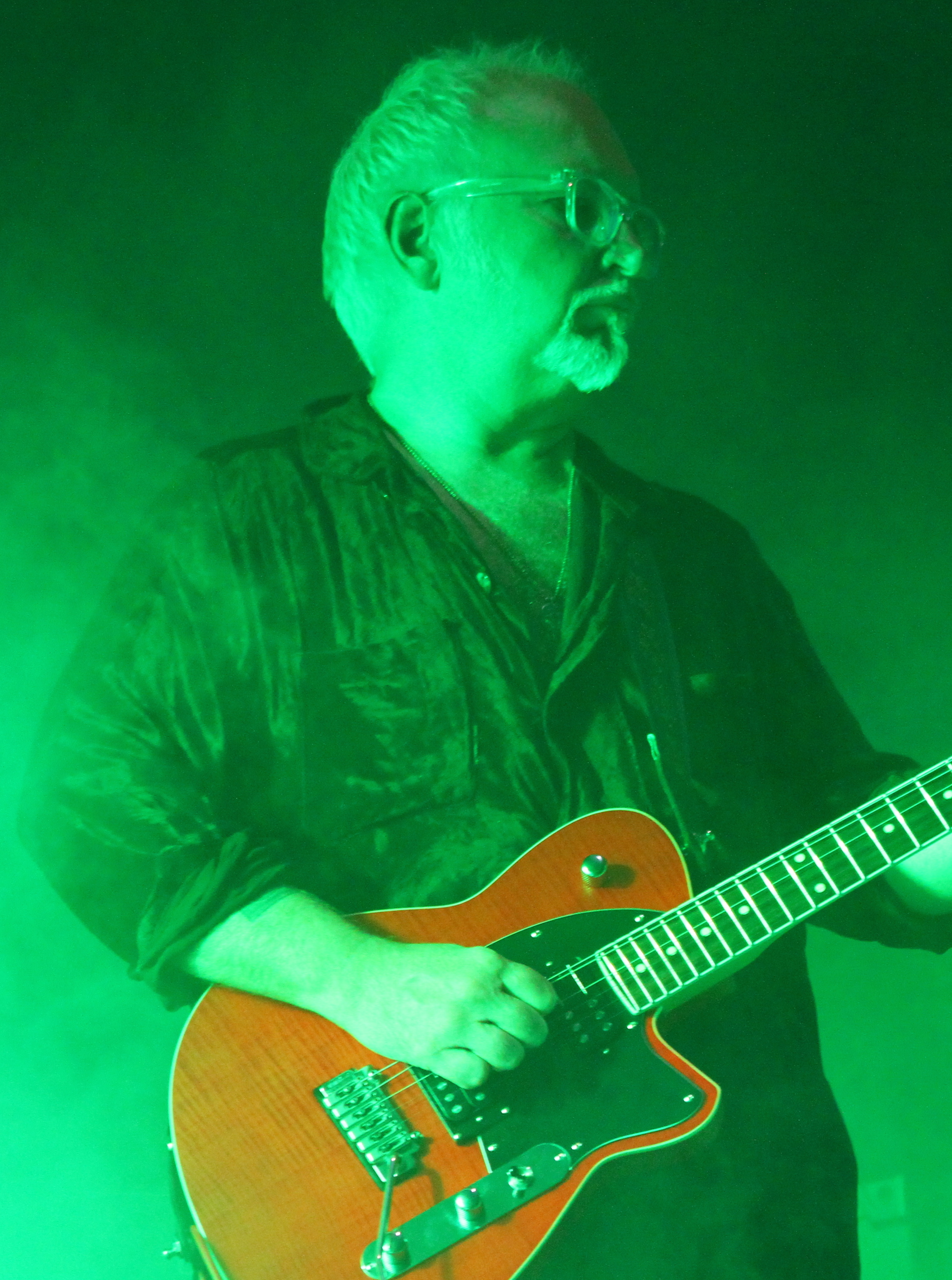
Reeves Gabrels has been the band's guitarist since 2012.

Name of song, writer(s), original release, producer(s) and year of release
Song	Writer(s)	Original release(s)	Producer(s)	Year	Ref(s)
"10:15 Saturday Night"	Robert Smith; Michael Dempsey; Lol Tolhurst	Three Imaginary Boys	Chris Parry	1979	
"The 13th"	Robert Smith; Simon Gallup; Perry Bamonte; Roger O'Donnell; Jason Cooper	Wild Mood Swings	Steve Lyon; Robert Smith	1996	
"2 Late"	Robert Smith; Simon Gallup; Porl Thompson; Lol Tolhurst; Boris Williams	B-side of "Lovesong"	Robert Smith; David M. Allen	1989	
"39"	Robert Smith	Bloodflowers	Robert Smith; Paul Corkett	2000	
"Abetabw" ‡ #	Robert Smith; Simon Gallup; Perry Bamonte; Porl Thompson; Boris Williams	Wish (Deluxe Edition)	–	2022	
"Accuracy"	Robert Smith; Michael Dempsey; Lol Tolhurst	Three Imaginary Boys	Chris Parry	1979	
"Adonais"	Robert Smith; Simon Gallup; Perry Bamonte; Roger O'Donnell; Jason Cooper	B-side of "The 13th" (UK CD2)	Steve Lyon; Robert Smith	1996	
"Airlock: The Soundtrack"	Robert Smith; Simon Gallup; Lol Tolhurst	Pornography (Deluxe Edition)	–	2005	
"All Cats Are Grey"	Robert Smith; Simon Gallup; Lol Tolhurst	Faith	The Cure; Mike Hedges	1981	
"All I Ever Am"	Robert Smith	Songs of a Lost World	Robert Smith; Paul Corkett	2024	
"All I Want"	Robert Smith; Simon Gallup; Porl Thompson; Lol Tolhurst; Boris Williams	Kiss Me, Kiss Me, Kiss Me	Robert Smith; David M. Allen	1987	
"All Kinds of Stuff"	Robert Smith; Simon Gallup; Jason Cooper; Porl Thompson	B-side of "Freakshow"	Robert Smith; Keith Uddin	2008	
"Alone"	Robert Smith	Songs of a Lost World	Robert Smith; Paul Corkett	2024	
"alt.end"	Robert Smith; Simon Gallup; Perry Bamonte; Roger O'Donnell; Jason Cooper	The Cure	Robert Smith; Ross Robinson	2004	
"And Nothing Is Forever"	Robert Smith	Songs of a Lost World	Robert Smith; Paul Corkett	2024	
"Anniversary"	Robert Smith; Simon Gallup; Perry Bamonte; Roger O'Donnell; Jason Cooper	The Cure	Robert Smith; Ross Robinson	2004	
"Another Day"	Robert Smith; Michael Dempsey; Lol Tolhurst	Three Imaginary Boys	Chris Parry	1979	
"Another Journey by Train" (Note: An instrumental remake of the single "Jumping Someone Else's Train".)	Robert Smith; Matthieu Hartley; Simon Gallup; Lol Tolhurst	B-side of "A Forest"	Mike Hedges; Robert Smith	1980	
"Apart"	Robert Smith; Simon Gallup; Perry Bamonte; Porl Thompson; Boris Williams	Wish	David M. Allen; The Cure	1992	
"Ariel" ‡ (Robert Smith)	Robert Smith	The Top (Deluxe Edition)	Robert Smith	2006	
"At Night"	Robert Smith; Matthieu Hartley; Simon Gallup; Lol Tolhurst	Seventeen Seconds	Mike Hedges; Robert Smith	1980	
"Babble"	Robert Smith; Simon Gallup; Porl Thompson; Lol Tolhurst; Boris Williams	B-side of "Lullaby"	Robert Smith; David M. Allen	1989	
"The Baby Screams"	Robert Smith	The Head on the Door	Robert Smith; David M. Allen	1985	
"Bananafishbones"	Robert Smith	The Top	Robert Smith; Chris Parry; David M. Allen	1984	
"Bare"	Robert Smith; Simon Gallup; Perry Bamonte; Roger O'Donnell; Jason Cooper	Wild Mood Swings	Steve Lyon; Robert Smith	1996	
"Before Three"	Robert Smith; Simon Gallup; Perry Bamonte; Roger O'Donnell; Jason Cooper	The Cure	Robert Smith; Ross Robinson	2004	
"The Big Hand"	Robert Smith; Simon Gallup; Porl Thompson; Boris Williams; Perry Bamonte	B-side of "A Letter to Elise"	David M. Allen; The Cure	1992	
"Bird Mad Girl"	Robert Smith; Lol Tolhurst	The Top	Robert Smith; Chris Parry; David M. Allen	1984	
"The Blood"	Robert Smith	The Head on the Door	Robert Smith; David M. Allen	1985	
"Bloodflowers"	Robert Smith	Bloodflowers	Robert Smith; Paul Corkett	2000	
"Boys Don't Cry"	Robert Smith; Michael Dempsey; Lol Tolhurst	Non-album single Boys Don't Cry	Chris Parry	1979	
"Break" ‡ #	Robert Smith; Simon Gallup; Lol Tolhurst	Pornography (Deluxe Edition)	–	2005	
"Breathe"	Robert Smith; Simon Gallup; Porl Thompson; Lol Tolhurst; Boris Williams	B-side of "Catch"	Robert Smith; David M. Allen	1987	
"Burn"	Robert Smith; Simon Gallup; Perry Bamonte; Boris Williams	The Crow: Original Motion Picture Soundtrack	Robert Smith; Bryan "Chuck" New	1994	
"Carnage Visors: The Soundtrack"	Robert Smith; Simon Gallup; Lol Tolhurst	Faith And 'Carnage Visors'	The Cure; Mike Hedges	1981	
"Catch"	Robert Smith; Simon Gallup; Porl Thompson; Lol Tolhurst; Boris Williams	Kiss Me, Kiss Me, Kiss Me	Robert Smith; David M. Allen	1987	
"The Caterpillar"	Robert Smith; Lol Tolhurst	The Top	Robert Smith; Chris Parry; David M. Allen	1984	
"A Chain of Flowers"	Robert Smith; Simon Gallup; Porl Thompson; Lol Tolhurst; Boris Williams	B-side of "Catch" (12")	Robert Smith; David M. Allen	1987	
"Charlotte Sometimes"	Robert Smith; Simon Gallup; Lol Tolhurst	Non-album single	The Cure; Mike Hedges	1981	
"Close to Me"	Robert Smith	The Head on the Door	Robert Smith; David M. Allen	1985	
"Closedown"	Robert Smith; Simon Gallup; Roger O'Donnell; Porl Thompson; Boris Williams	Disintegration	Robert Smith; David M. Allen	1989	
"Cloudberry" #	Robert Smith; Simon Gallup; Perry Bamonte; Porl Thompson; Boris Williams	Lost Wishes (Note: Later included on the 2022 deluxe edition of Wish) (limited edition cassette)	David M. Allen; The Cure	1994	
"Club America"	Robert Smith; Simon Gallup; Perry Bamonte; Roger O'Donnell; Jason Cooper	Wild Mood Swings	Steve Lyon; Robert Smith	1996	
"The Cocktail Party" ‡	Robert Smith; Michael Dempsey; Lol Tolhurst	Three Imaginary Boys (Deluxe Edition)	–	2004	
"Cold"	Robert Smith; Simon Gallup; Lol Tolhurst	Pornography	Phil Thornalley; The Cure	1982	
"Coming Up"	Robert Smith	Bloodflowers (LP and international CD editions)	Robert Smith; Paul Corkett	2000	
"Cut"	Robert Smith; Simon Gallup; Perry Bamonte; Porl Thompson; Boris Williams	Wish	David M. Allen; The Cure	1992	
"Cut Here"	Robert Smith; Simon Gallup; Perry Bamonte; Roger O'Donnell; Jason Cooper	Greatest Hits	Robert Smith; Mark Plati	2001	
"Delirious Night"	Robert Smith; Simon Gallup; Roger O'Donnell; Porl Thompson; Boris Williams	Disintegration (Deluxe Edition)	–	2010	
"Demise" ‡ #	Robert Smith; Simon Gallup; Lol Tolhurst	Pornography (Deluxe Edition)	–	2005	
"Descent"	Robert Smith; Simon Gallup; Lol Tolhurst	B-side of "Primary"	The Cure; Mike Hedges	1981	
"Disintegration"	Robert Smith; Simon Gallup; Roger O'Donnell; Porl Thompson; Boris Williams	Disintegration	Robert Smith; David M. Allen	1989	
"Do the Hansa"	Robert Smith; Lol Tolhurst; Michael Dempsey	B-side of "Boys Don't Cry (New Voice • New Mix)" (12")	Robert Smith; David M. Allen	1986	
"Doing the Unstuck"	Robert Smith; Simon Gallup; Perry Bamonte; Porl Thompson; Boris Williams	Wish	David M. Allen; The Cure	1992	
"Doubt"	Robert Smith; Simon Gallup; Lol Tolhurst	Faith	The Cure; Mike Hedges	1981	
"Down Under"	Robert Smith; Simon Gallup; Jason Cooper; Porl Thompson	B-side of "Sleep When I'm Dead"	Robert Smith; Keith Uddin	2008	
"The Dream"	Robert Smith	B-side of "The Walk"	Steve Nye	1983	
"Dredd Song"	Robert Smith; Simon Gallup; Perry Bamonte; Roger O'Donnell; Jason Cooper	Judge Dredd (Original Motion Picture Soundtrack)	Robert Smith; Steve Lyon	1995	
"Dressing Up"	Robert Smith	The Top	Robert Smith; Chris Parry; David M. Allen	1984	
"Drone:Nodrone"	Robert Smith	Songs of a Lost World	Robert Smith; Paul Corkett	2024	
"The Drowning Man"	Robert Smith; Simon Gallup; Lol Tolhurst	Faith	The Cure; Mike Hedges	1981	
"The Empty World"	Robert Smith	The Top	Robert Smith; Chris Parry; David M. Allen	1984	
"End"	Robert Smith; Simon Gallup; Perry Bamonte; Porl Thompson; Boris Williams	Wish	David M. Allen; The Cure	1992	
"The End of the World"	Robert Smith; Simon Gallup; Perry Bamonte; Roger O'Donnell; Jason Cooper	The Cure	Robert Smith; Ross Robinson	2004	
"Endsong"	Robert Smith	Songs of a Lost World	Robert Smith; Paul Corkett	2024	
"Esten" ‡ #	Robert Smith; Simon Gallup; Roger O'Donnell; Porl Thompson; Boris Williams	Disintegration (Deluxe Edition)	–	2010	
"The Exploding Boy"	Robert Smith	B-side of "In Between Days"	Robert Smith; David M. Allen	1985	
"Faded Smiles" (a.k.a. "I Don't Know")	Robert Smith; Michael Dempsey; Lol Tolhurst	Three Imaginary Boys (Deluxe Edition)	Chris Parry	2004	
"Faith"	Robert Smith; Simon Gallup; Lol Tolhurst	Faith	The Cure; Mike Hedges	1981	
"Fake"	Robert Smith; Simon Gallup; Perry Bamonte; Roger O'Donnell; Jason Cooper	The Cure (Japanese edition)	Robert Smith; Ross Robinson	2004	
"Fascination Street"	Robert Smith; Simon Gallup; Roger O'Donnell; Porl Thompson; Boris Williams	Disintegration	Robert Smith; David M. Allen	1989	
"Fear of Ghosts"	Robert Smith; Simon Gallup; Porl Thompson; Lol Tolhurst; Boris Williams	B-side of "Lovesong" (12")	Robert Smith; David M. Allen	1989	
"A Few Hours After This"	Robert Smith	B-side of "In Between Days" (12")	Robert Smith; David M. Allen	1985	
"Fight"	Robert Smith; Simon Gallup; Porl Thompson; Lol Tolhurst; Boris Williams	Kiss Me, Kiss Me, Kiss Me	Robert Smith; David M. Allen	1987	
"The Figurehead"	Robert Smith; Simon Gallup; Lol Tolhurst	Pornography	Phil Thornalley; The Cure	1982	
"The Final Sound"	Robert Smith; Matthieu Hartley; Simon Gallup; Lol Tolhurst	Seventeen Seconds	Mike Hedges; Robert Smith	1980	
"Fire in Cairo"	Robert Smith; Michael Dempsey; Lol Tolhurst	Three Imaginary Boys	Chris Parry	1979	
"A Foolish Arrangement"	Robert Smith; Simon Gallup; Porl Thompson; Boris Williams; Perry Bamonte	B-side of "A Letter to Elise" (12")	David M. Allen; The Cure	1992	
"A Forest"	Robert Smith; Matthieu Hartley; Simon Gallup; Lol Tolhurst	Seventeen Seconds	Mike Hedges; Robert Smith	1980	
"Foxy Lady" (The Jimi Hendrix Experience cover)	Jimi Hendrix †	Three Imaginary Boys	Chris Parry	1979	
"A Fragile Thing"	Robert Smith	Songs of a Lost World	Robert Smith; Paul Corkett	2024	
"Freakshow"	Robert Smith; Simon Gallup; Jason Cooper; Porl Thompson	4:13 Dream	Robert Smith; Keith Uddin	2008	
"Friday I'm in Love"	Robert Smith; Simon Gallup; Perry Bamonte; Porl Thompson; Boris Williams	Wish	David M. Allen; The Cure	1992	
"Frogfish" ‡ #	Robert Smith; Simon Gallup; Perry Bamonte; Porl Thompson; Boris Williams	Wish (Deluxe Edition)	–	2022	
"From the Edge of the Deep Green Sea"	Robert Smith; Simon Gallup; Perry Bamonte; Porl Thompson; Boris Williams	Wish	David M. Allen; The Cure	1992	
"The Funeral Party"	Robert Smith; Simon Gallup; Lol Tolhurst	Faith	The Cure; Mike Hedges	1981	
"Give Me It"	Robert Smith	The Top	Robert Smith; Chris Parry; David M. Allen	1984	
"Going Nowhere" (Note: Excluded from North American pressings of The Cure)	Robert Smith; Simon Gallup; Perry Bamonte; Roger O'Donnell; Jason Cooper	The Cure	Robert Smith; Ross Robinson	2004	
"Gone!"	Robert Smith; Simon Gallup; Perry Bamonte; Roger O'Donnell; Jason Cooper	Wild Mood Swings	Steve Lyon; Robert Smith	1996	
"Grinding Halt"	Robert Smith; Michael Dempsey; Lol Tolhurst	Three Imaginary Boys	Chris Parry	1979	
"Halo"	Robert Smith; Simon Gallup; Porl Thompson; Boris Williams; Perry Bamonte	B-side of "Friday I'm in Love"	David M. Allen; The Cure	1992	
"A Hand Inside My Mouth" ‡	Robert Smith	The Top (Deluxe Edition)	–	2006	
"The Hanging Garden"	Robert Smith; Simon Gallup; Lol Tolhurst	Pornography	Phil Thornalley; The Cure	1982	
"Happy the Man"	Robert Smith	B-side of "The Caterpillar"	Phil Thornalley; Chris Parry; The Cure	1984	
"Harold and Joe"	Robert Smith; Simon Gallup; Porl Thompson; Boris Williams	B-side of "Never Enough"	David M. Allen; The Cure	1990	
"Heart Attack" ‡ #	Robert Smith; Simon Gallup; Perry Bamonte; Porl Thompson; Boris Williams	Wish (Deluxe Edition)	–	2022	
"Hello, I Love You" (The Doors cover)	John Densmore; Robby Krieger; Ray Manzarek; Jim Morrison †	Rubáiyát: Elektra's 40th Anniversary	Steve Whitfield	1990	
"Heroin Face" (live)	Robert Smith; Michael Dempsey; Lol Tolhurst	Three Imaginary Boys (Deluxe Edition)	–	2004	
"Hey You!!!"	Robert Smith; Simon Gallup; Porl Thompson; Lol Tolhurst; Boris Williams	Kiss Me, Kiss Me, Kiss Me	Robert Smith; David M. Allen	1987	
"High"	Robert Smith; Simon Gallup; Perry Bamonte; Porl Thompson; Boris Williams	Wish	David M. Allen; The Cure	1992	
"The Holy Hour"	Robert Smith; Simon Gallup; Lol Tolhurst	Faith	The Cure; Mike Hedges	1981	
"Home"	Robert Smith; Simon Gallup; Perry Bamonte; Roger O'Donnell; Jason Cooper	B-side of "Mint Car" (UK CD1)	Steve Lyon; Robert Smith	1996	
"Homesick"	Robert Smith; Simon Gallup; Roger O'Donnell; Porl Thompson; Boris Williams	Disintegration (CD only) (Note: Not included on the original vinyl releases of Disintegration.)	Robert Smith; David M. Allen	1989	
"Hot Hot Hot!!!"	Robert Smith; Simon Gallup; Porl Thompson; Lol Tolhurst; Boris Williams	Kiss Me, Kiss Me, Kiss Me	Robert Smith; David M. Allen	1987	
"How Beautiful You Are..."	Robert Smith; Simon Gallup; Porl Thompson; Lol Tolhurst; Boris Williams	Kiss Me, Kiss Me, Kiss Me	Robert Smith; David M. Allen	1987	
"The Hungry Ghost"	Robert Smith; Simon Gallup; Jason Cooper; Porl Thompson	4:13 Dream	Robert Smith; Keith Uddin	2008	
"I Can Never Say Goodbye"	Robert Smith	Songs of a Lost World	Robert Smith; Paul Corkett	2024	
"I Dig You" (Released under the name Cult Hero)	Robert Smith	B-side of "I'm a Cult Hero"	Chris Parry	1979	
"(I Don't Know What's Going) On"	Robert Smith; Simon Gallup; Perry Bamonte; Roger O'Donnell; Jason Cooper	The Cure	Robert Smith; Ross Robinson	2004	
"I Just Need Myself" ‡	Robert Smith; Michael Dempsey; Lol Tolhurst	Three Imaginary Boys (Deluxe Edition)	–	2004	
"I Want to Be Old" ‡	Robert Smith; Michael Dempsey; Lol Tolhurst	Three Imaginary Boys (Deluxe Edition)	–	2004	
"I'm a Cult Hero" (Released under the name Cult Hero)	Robert Smith	Non-album single	Chris Parry	1979	
"I'm Cold"	Robert Smith; Michael Dempsey; Lol Tolhurst	B-side of "Jumping Someone Else's Train"	Chris Parry	1979	
"Icing Sugar"	Robert Smith; Simon Gallup; Porl Thompson; Lol Tolhurst; Boris Williams	Kiss Me, Kiss Me, Kiss Me	Robert Smith; David M. Allen	1987	
"If Only Tonight We Could Sleep"	Robert Smith; Simon Gallup; Porl Thompson; Lol Tolhurst; Boris Williams	Kiss Me, Kiss Me, Kiss Me	Robert Smith; David M. Allen	1987	
"In Between Days"	Robert Smith	The Head on the Door	Robert Smith; David M. Allen	1985	
"In Your House"	Robert Smith; Matthieu Hartley; Simon Gallup; Lol Tolhurst	Seventeen Seconds	Mike Hedges; Robert Smith	1980	
"Innsbruck" ‡ # (Robert Smith)	Robert Smith	The Head on the Door (Deluxe Edition)	Robert Smith	2006	
"Inwood" ‡ # (Robert Smith)	Robert Smith	The Head on the Door (Deluxe Edition)	Robert Smith	2006	
"It Used to Be Me"	Robert Smith; Simon Gallup; Perry Bamonte; Roger O'Donnell; Jason Cooper	B-side of "The 13th" (UK CD1)	Steve Lyon; Robert Smith	1996	
"It's Not You"	Robert Smith; Michael Dempsey; Lol Tolhurst	Three Imaginary Boys	Chris Parry	1979	
"It's Over"	Robert Smith; Simon Gallup; Jason Cooper; Porl Thompson	4:13 Dream	Robert Smith; Keith Uddin	2008	
"A Japanese Dream"	Robert Smith; Simon Gallup; Porl Thompson; Lol Tolhurst; Boris Williams	B-side of "Why Can't I Be You?"	Robert Smith; David M. Allen	1987	
"Jumping Someone Else's Train"	Robert Smith; Michael Dempsey; Lol Tolhurst	Non-album single (UK); Boys Don't Cry (US)	Chris Parry	1979	
"Jupiter Crash"	Robert Smith; Simon Gallup; Perry Bamonte; Roger O'Donnell; Jason Cooper	Wild Mood Swings	Steve Lyon; Robert Smith	1996	
"Just Like Heaven"	Robert Smith; Simon Gallup; Porl Thompson; Lol Tolhurst; Boris Williams	Kiss Me, Kiss Me, Kiss Me	Robert Smith; David M. Allen	1987	
"Just One Kiss"	Robert Smith; Lol Tolhurst	B-side of "Let's Go to Bed"	Chris Parry	1982	
"Just Say Yes"	Robert Smith; Simon Gallup; Perry Bamonte; Roger O'Donnell; Jason Cooper	Greatest Hits	Robert Smith; Mark Plati	2001	
"Killing an Arab"	Robert Smith; Michael Dempsey; Lol Tolhurst	Non-album single (UK); Boys Don't Cry (US)	Chris Parry	1979	
"The Kiss"	Robert Smith; Simon Gallup; Porl Thompson; Lol Tolhurst; Boris Williams	Kiss Me, Kiss Me, Kiss Me	Robert Smith; David M. Allen	1987	
"Kyoto Song"	Robert Smith	The Head on the Door	Robert Smith; David M. Allen; Howard Gray	1985	
"Labyrinth"	Robert Smith; Simon Gallup; Perry Bamonte; Roger O'Donnell; Jason Cooper	The Cure	Robert Smith; Ross Robinson	2004	
"Lament" (Note: Originally recorded as a promotion single for Flexipop magazine in 1982. A new version was recorded in 1983, released as a B-side of the single "The Walk".)	Robert Smith; Simon Gallup; Lol Tolhurst	Non-album promo single	–	1982	
"Last Dance"	Robert Smith; Simon Gallup; Roger O'Donnell; Porl Thompson; Boris Williams	Disintegration (CD only)	Robert Smith; David M. Allen	1989	
"The Last Day of Summer"	Robert Smith	Bloodflowers	Robert Smith; Paul Corkett	2000	
"A Letter to Elise"	Robert Smith; Simon Gallup; Perry Bamonte; Porl Thompson; Boris Williams	Wish	David M. Allen; The Cure	1992	
"Let's Go to Bed"	Robert Smith; Lol Tolhurst	Non-album single	Chris Parry	1982	
"Like Cockatoos"	Robert Smith; Simon Gallup; Porl Thompson; Lol Tolhurst; Boris Williams	Kiss Me, Kiss Me, Kiss Me	Robert Smith; David M. Allen	1987	
"Lime Time" ‡	Robert Smith	The Head on the Door (Deluxe Edition)	–	2006	
"Lost"	Robert Smith; Simon Gallup; Perry Bamonte; Roger O'Donnell; Jason Cooper	The Cure	Robert Smith; Ross Robinson	2004	
"The Loundest Sound"	Robert Smith	Bloodflowers	Robert Smith; Paul Corkett	2000	
"Love" (John Lennon cover)	John Lennon †	Non-album promo single	The Cure; Mike Hedges	2005	
"The Love Cats" (or "The Lovecats")	Robert Smith	Non-album single	Phil Thornalley; Chris Parry; The Cure	1983	
"Lovesong"	Robert Smith; Simon Gallup; Roger O'Donnell; Porl Thompson; Boris Williams	Disintegration	Robert Smith; David M. Allen	1989	
"Lullaby"	Robert Smith; Simon Gallup; Roger O'Donnell; Porl Thompson; Boris Williams	Disintegration	Robert Smith; David M. Allen	1989	
"M"	Robert Smith; Matthieu Hartley; Simon Gallup; Lol Tolhurst	Seventeen Seconds	Mike Hedges; Robert Smith	1980	
"A Man Inside My Mouth"	Robert Smith	B-side of "Close to Me"	Robert Smith; David M. Allen	1985	
"Mansolidgone" ‡	Robert Smith	The Head on the Door (Deluxe Edition)	–	2006	
"Maybe Someday"	Robert Smith	Bloodflowers	Robert Smith; Paul Corkett	2000	
"Meat Hook"	Robert Smith; Michael Dempsey; Lol Tolhurst	Three Imaginary Boys	Chris Parry	1979	
"Mint Car"	Robert Smith; Simon Gallup; Perry Bamonte; Roger O'Donnell; Jason Cooper	Wild Mood Swings	Steve Lyon; Robert Smith	1996	
"Miss van Gogh" ‡ #	Robert Smith; Simon Gallup; Perry Bamonte; Porl Thompson; Boris Williams	Wish (Deluxe Edition)	–	2022	
"More than This"	Robert Smith	The X-Files: The Album	Robert Smith; Paul Corkett	1998	
"Mr. Pink Eyes"	Robert Smith; Lol Tolhurst	B-side of "The Love Cats" (12")	Phil Thornalley; Chris Parry; The Cure	1983	
"Never"	Robert Smith; Simon Gallup; Perry Bamonte; Roger O'Donnell; Jason Cooper	The Cure	Robert Smith; Ross Robinson	2004	
"Never Enough"	Robert Smith; Simon Gallup; Porl Thompson; Boris Williams	Mixed Up	David M. Allen; The Cure	1990	
"New Day"	Robert Smith; Lol Tolhurst	B-side of "Close to Me" (CD single)	Robert Smith; David M. Allen	1985	
"A Night Like This"	Robert Smith	The Head on the Door	Robert Smith; David M. Allen; Howard Gray	1985	
"Noheart" ‡ #	Robert Smith; Simon Gallup; Roger O'Donnell; Porl Thompson; Boris Williams	Disintegration (Deluxe Edition)	–	2010	
"Now Is the Time" ‡ #	Robert Smith; Simon Gallup; Perry Bamonte; Porl Thompson; Boris Williams	Wish (Deluxe Edition)	–	2022	
"Numb"	Robert Smith; Simon Gallup; Perry Bamonte; Roger O'Donnell; Jason Cooper	Wild Mood Swings	Steve Lyon; Robert Smith	1996	
"NY Trip"	Robert Smith; Simon Gallup; Jason Cooper; Porl Thompson	B-side of "The Only One"	Robert Smith; Keith Uddin	2008	
"Object"	Robert Smith; Michael Dempsey; Lol Tolhurst	Three Imaginary Boys	Chris Parry	1979	
"Ocean"	Robert Smith; Simon Gallup; Perry Bamonte; Roger O'Donnell; Jason Cooper	B-side of "The 13th" (UK CD2)	Steve Lyon; Robert Smith	1996	
"Off to Sleep..." #	Robert Smith; Simon Gallup; Perry Bamonte; Porl Thompson; Boris Williams	Lost Wishes (limited edition cassette)	David M. Allen; The Cure	1994	
"One Hundred Years"	Robert Smith; Simon Gallup; Lol Tolhurst	Pornography	Phil Thornalley; The Cure	1982	
"One More Time"	Robert Smith; Simon Gallup; Porl Thompson; Lol Tolhurst; Boris Williams	Kiss Me, Kiss Me, Kiss Me	Robert Smith; David M. Allen	1987	
"The Only One"	Robert Smith; Simon Gallup; Jason Cooper; Porl Thompson	4:13 Dream	Robert Smith; Keith Uddin	2008	
"Open"	Robert Smith; Simon Gallup; Perry Bamonte; Porl Thompson; Boris Williams	Wish	David M. Allen; The Cure	1992	
"Other Voices"	Robert Smith; Simon Gallup; Lol Tolhurst	Faith	The Cure; Mike Hedges	1981	
"Out of Mind"	Robert Smith; Simon Gallup; Porl Thompson; Lol Tolhurst; Boris Williams	B-side of "Lullaby" (12")	Robert Smith; David M. Allen	1989	
"Out of This World (Oakenfold Remix)"	Robert Smith; Simon Gallup; Perry Bamonte; Roger O'Donnell; Jason Cooper	Join the Dots: B-Sides & Rarities 1978–2001 (The Fiction Years)	Robert Smith; Paul Corkett	2004	
"The Perfect Boy"	Robert Smith; Simon Gallup; Jason Cooper; Porl Thompson	4:13 Dream	Robert Smith; Keith Uddin	2008	
"The Perfect Girl"	Robert Smith; Simon Gallup; Porl Thompson; Lol Tolhurst; Boris Williams	Kiss Me, Kiss Me, Kiss Me	Robert Smith; David M. Allen	1987	
"Pictures of You"	Robert Smith; Simon Gallup; Roger O'Donnell; Porl Thompson; Boris Williams	Disintegration	Robert Smith; David M. Allen	1989	
"Piggy in the Mirror"	Robert Smith; Lol Tolhurst	The Top	Robert Smith; Chris Parry; David M. Allen	1984	
"Pillbox Tales"	Robert Smith; Lol Tolhurst; Michael Dempsey	B-side of "Boys Don't Cry (New Voice • New Mix)"	Robert Smith; David M. Allen	1986	
"A Pink Dream"	Robert Smith; Simon Gallup; Perry Bamonte; Roger O'Donnell; Jason Cooper	B-side of "Mint Car" (UK CD2)	Steve Lyon; Robert Smith	1996	
"Pirate Ships"† (Robert Smith)	Wendy Waldman	Disintegration (Deluxe Edition)	Robert Smith; Mark Saunders	2010	
"Plainsong"	Robert Smith; Simon Gallup; Roger O'Donnell; Porl Thompson; Boris Williams	Disintegration	Robert Smith; David M. Allen	1989	
"Plastic Passion"	Robert Smith; Michael Dempsey; Lol Tolhurst	B-side of "Boys Don't Cry"; Boys Don't Cry	Chris Parry	1979	
"Play"	Robert Smith; Simon Gallup; Porl Thompson; Boris Williams; Perry Bamonte	B-side of "High" (12")	David M. Allen; The Cure	1992	
"Play for Today"	Robert Smith; Matthieu Hartley; Simon Gallup; Lol Tolhurst	Seventeen Seconds	Mike Hedges; Robert Smith	1980	
"Play with Me"	Robert Smith; Michael Dempsey; Lol Tolhurst	Three Imaginary Boys (Deluxe Edition)	Chris Parry	2004	
"Pornography"	Robert Smith; Simon Gallup; Lol Tolhurst	Pornography	Phil Thornalley; The Cure	1982	
"Possession"	Robert Smith; Simon Gallup; Perry Bamonte; Roger O'Donnell; Jason Cooper	Join the Dots: B-Sides & Rarities 1978–2001 (The Fiction Years)	Robert Smith; Paul Corkett	2004	
"Prayers for Rain"	Robert Smith; Simon Gallup; Roger O'Donnell; Porl Thompson; Boris Williams	Disintegration	Robert Smith; David M. Allen	1989	
"Primary"	Robert Smith; Simon Gallup; Lol Tolhurst	Faith	The Cure; Mike Hedges	1981	
"The Promise"	Robert Smith; Simon Gallup; Perry Bamonte; Roger O'Donnell; Jason Cooper	The Cure	Robert Smith; Ross Robinson	2004	
"Purple Haze" (The Jimi Hendrix Experience cover)	Jimi Hendrix †	Stone Free: A Tribute to Jimi Hendrix	Robert Smith; Bryan "Chuck" New	1993	
"Push"	Robert Smith	The Head on the Door	Robert Smith; David M. Allen; Howard Gray	1985	
"The Real Snow White"	Robert Smith; Simon Gallup; Jason Cooper; Porl Thompson	4:13 Dream	Robert Smith; Keith Uddin	2008	
"The Reasons Why"	Robert Smith; Simon Gallup; Jason Cooper; Porl Thompson	4:13 Dream	Robert Smith; Keith Uddin	2008	
"A Reflection"	Robert Smith; Matthieu Hartley; Simon Gallup; Lol Tolhurst	Seventeen Seconds	Mike Hedges; Robert Smith	1980	
"Return"	Robert Smith; Simon Gallup; Perry Bamonte; Roger O'Donnell; Jason Cooper	Wild Mood Swings	Steve Lyon; Robert Smith	1996	
"Round & Round & Round"	Robert Smith; Simon Gallup; Perry Bamonte; Roger O'Donnell; Jason Cooper	Wild Mood Swings	Steve Lyon; Robert Smith	1996	
"Sadacic" ‡ (Robert Smith)	Robert Smith	The Top (Deluxe Edition)	Robert Smith	2006	
"The Same Deep Water as You"	Robert Smith; Simon Gallup; Roger O'Donnell; Porl Thompson; Boris Williams	Disintegration	Robert Smith; David M. Allen	1989	
"The Scream"	Robert Smith; Simon Gallup; Jason Cooper; Porl Thompson	4:13 Dream	Robert Smith; Keith Uddin	2008	
"Secrets"	Robert Smith; Matthieu Hartley; Simon Gallup; Lol Tolhurst	Seventeen Seconds	Mike Hedges; Robert Smith	1980	
"Seventeen Seconds"	Robert Smith; Matthieu Hartley; Simon Gallup; Lol Tolhurst	Seventeen Seconds	Mike Hedges; Robert Smith	1980	
"Scared as You"	Robert Smith; Simon Gallup; Porl Thompson; Boris Williams; Perry Bamonte	B-side of "Friday I'm in Love" (12")	David M. Allen; The Cure	1992	
"Screw"	Robert Smith	The Head on the Door	Robert Smith; David M. Allen	1985	
"Shake Dog Shake"	Robert Smith	The Top	Robert Smith; Chris Parry; David M. Allen	1984	
"Shiver and Shake"	Robert Smith; Simon Gallup; Porl Thompson; Lol Tolhurst; Boris Williams	Kiss Me, Kiss Me, Kiss Me	Robert Smith; David M. Allen	1987	
"A Short Term Effect"	Robert Smith; Simon Gallup; Lol Tolhurst	Pornography	Phil Thornalley; The Cure	1982	
"Siamese Twins"	Robert Smith; Simon Gallup; Lol Tolhurst	Pornography	Phil Thornalley; The Cure	1982	
"Signal to Noise"	Robert Smith; Simon Gallup; Perry Bamonte; Roger O'Donnell; Jason Cooper	B-side of "Cut Here"	Robert Smith; Mark Plati	2001	
"Sinking"	Robert Smith	The Head on the Door	Robert Smith; David M. Allen	1985	
"Sirensong"	Robert Smith; Simon Gallup; Jason Cooper; Porl Thompson	4:13 Dream	Robert Smith; Keith Uddin	2008	
"Six Different Ways"	Robert Smith	The Head on the Door	Robert Smith; David M. Allen	1985	
"Sleep When I'm Dead"	Robert Smith; Simon Gallup; Jason Cooper; Porl Thompson	4:13 Dream	Robert Smith; Keith Uddin	2008	
"The Snakepit"	Robert Smith; Simon Gallup; Porl Thompson; Lol Tolhurst; Boris Williams	Kiss Me, Kiss Me, Kiss Me	Robert Smith; David M. Allen	1987	
"Snow in Summer"	Robert Smith; Simon Gallup; Porl Thompson; Lol Tolhurst; Boris Williams	B-side of "Just Like Heaven"	Robert Smith; David M. Allen	1987	
"So What"	Robert Smith; Michael Dempsey; Lol Tolhurst	Three Imaginary Boys	Chris Parry	1979	
"Speak My Language"	Robert Smith; Lol Tolhurst	B-side of "The Love Cats"	Phil Thornalley; Chris Parry; The Cure	1983	
"Spilt Milk"	Robert Smith	Bloodflowers (Online bonus track)	Robert Smith; Paul Corkett	2000	
"Splintered in Her Head"	Robert Smith; Simon Gallup; Lol Tolhurst	B-side of "Charlotte Sometimes"	The Cure; Mike Hedges	1981	
"Stop Dead"	Robert Smith	B-side of "Close to Me" (12")	Robert Smith; David M. Allen; Howard Gray	1985	
"Strange Attraction"	Robert Smith; Simon Gallup; Perry Bamonte; Roger O'Donnell; Jason Cooper	Wild Mood Swings	Steve Lyon; Robert Smith	1996	
"A Strange Day"	Robert Smith; Simon Gallup; Lol Tolhurst	Pornography	Phil Thornalley; The Cure	1982	
"Subway Song"	Robert Smith; Michael Dempsey; Lol Tolhurst	Three Imaginary Boys	Chris Parry	1979	
"Sugar Girl"	Robert Smith; Simon Gallup; Porl Thompson; Lol Tolhurst; Boris Williams	B-side of "Just Like Heaven" (12")	Robert Smith; David M. Allen	1987	
"Swing Change" ‡ #	Robert Smith; Simon Gallup; Perry Bamonte; Porl Thompson; Boris Williams	Wish (Deluxe Edition)	–	2022	
"Switch"	Robert Smith; Simon Gallup; Jason Cooper; Porl Thompson	4:13 Dream	Robert Smith; Keith Uddin	2008	
"T6" ‡ #	Robert Smith; Simon Gallup; Perry Bamonte; Porl Thompson; Boris Williams	Wish (Deluxe Edition)	–	2022	
"T7" ‡ #	Robert Smith; Simon Gallup; Perry Bamonte; Porl Thompson; Boris Williams	Wish (Deluxe Edition)	–	2022	
"T8" ‡ #	Robert Smith; Simon Gallup; Perry Bamonte; Porl Thompson; Boris Williams	Wish (Deluxe Edition)	–	2022	
"Taking Off"	Robert Smith; Simon Gallup; Perry Bamonte; Roger O'Donnell; Jason Cooper	The Cure	Robert Smith; Ross Robinson	2004	
"Temptation" ‡ #	Robert Smith; Simon Gallup; Lol Tolhurst	Pornography (Deluxe Edition)	–	2005	
"Temptation Two" ‡ (a.k.a. "Let's Go to Bed") (Robert Smith)	Robert Smith; Simon Gallup; Lol Tolhurst	Pornography (Deluxe Edition)	–	2005	
"There Is No If..."	Robert Smith	Bloodflowers	Robert Smith; Paul Corkett	2000	
"This. Here and Now. With You"	Robert Smith; Simon Gallup; Jason Cooper; Porl Thompson	4:13 Dream	Robert Smith; Keith Uddin	2008	
"This Is a Lie"	Robert Smith; Simon Gallup; Perry Bamonte; Roger O'Donnell; Jason Cooper	Wild Mood Swings	Steve Lyon; Robert Smith	1996	
"This Morning"	Robert Smith; Simon Gallup; Perry Bamonte; Roger O'Donnell; Jason Cooper	The Cure (LP only)	Robert Smith; Ross Robinson	2004	
"This Twilight Garden"	Robert Smith; Simon Gallup; Porl Thompson; Boris Williams; Perry Bamonte	B-side of "High"	David M. Allen; The Cure	1992	
"A Thousand Hours"	Robert Smith; Simon Gallup; Porl Thompson; Lol Tolhurst; Boris Williams	Kiss Me, Kiss Me, Kiss Me	Robert Smith; David M. Allen	1987	
"Three"	Robert Smith; Matthieu Hartley; Simon Gallup; Lol Tolhurst	Seventeen Seconds	Mike Hedges; Robert Smith	1980	
"Three Imaginary Boys"	Robert Smith; Michael Dempsey; Lol Tolhurst	Three Imaginary Boys	Chris Parry	1979	
"The Three Sisters" #	Robert Smith; Simon Gallup; Perry Bamonte; Porl Thompson; Boris Williams	Lost Wishes (limited edition cassette)	David M. Allen; The Cure	1994	
"Throw Your Foot"	Robert Smith	B-side of "The Caterpillar" (12")	Phil Thornalley; Chris Parry; The Cure	1984	
"To the Sky"	Robert Smith; Simon Gallup; Porl Thompson; Lol Tolhurst; Boris Williams	Stranger Than Fiction (label sampler)	Robert Smith; David M. Allen	1989	
"To Wish Impossible Things"	Robert Smith; Simon Gallup; Perry Bamonte; Porl Thompson; Boris Williams	Wish	David M. Allen; The Cure	1992	
"The Top"	Robert Smith	The Top	Robert Smith; Chris Parry; David M. Allen	1984	
"Torture"	Robert Smith; Simon Gallup; Porl Thompson; Lol Tolhurst; Boris Williams	Kiss Me, Kiss Me, Kiss Me	Robert Smith; David M. Allen	1987	
"Trap"	Robert Smith; Simon Gallup; Perry Bamonte; Roger O'Donnell; Jason Cooper	Wild Mood Swings	Steve Lyon; Robert Smith	1996	
"Treasure"	Robert Smith; Simon Gallup; Perry Bamonte; Roger O'Donnell; Jason Cooper	Wild Mood Swings	Steve Lyon; Robert Smith	1996	
"Trust"	Robert Smith; Simon Gallup; Perry Bamonte; Porl Thompson; Boris Williams	Wish	David M. Allen; The Cure	1992	
"Truth Goodness and Beauty" (Note: Excluded from North American, Brazilian and some European pressings of The Cure)	Robert Smith; Simon Gallup; Perry Bamonte; Roger O'Donnell; Jason Cooper	The Cure	Robert Smith; Ross Robinson	2004	
"Underneath the Stars"	Robert Smith; Simon Gallup; Jason Cooper; Porl Thompson	4:13 Dream	Robert Smith; Keith Uddin	2008	
"Untitled"	Robert Smith; Simon Gallup; Roger O'Donnell; Porl Thompson; Boris Williams	Disintegration	Robert Smith; David M. Allen	1989	
"The Upstairs Room"	Robert Smith; Lol Tolhurst	B-side of "The Walk" (12")	Steve Nye	1983	
"Us or Them"	Robert Smith; Simon Gallup; Perry Bamonte; Roger O'Donnell; Jason Cooper	The Cure	Robert Smith; Ross Robinson	2004	
"Uyea Sound" #	Robert Smith; Simon Gallup; Perry Bamonte; Porl Thompson; Boris Williams	Lost Wishes (limited edition cassette)	David M. Allen; The Cure	1994	
"Wailing Wall"	Robert Smith	The Top	Robert Smith; Chris Parry; David M. Allen	1984	
"Waiting"	Robert Smith; Simon Gallup; Perry Bamonte; Roger O'Donnell; Jason Cooper	B-side of "Mint Car" (UK CD2)	Steve Lyon; Robert Smith	1996	
"The Walk"	Robert Smith; Lol Tolhurst	Non-album single	Steve Nye	1983	
"Want"	Robert Smith; Simon Gallup; Perry Bamonte; Roger O'Donnell; Jason Cooper	Wild Mood Swings	Steve Lyon; Robert Smith	1996	
"Watching Me Fall"	Robert Smith	Bloodflowers	Robert Smith; Paul Corkett	2000	
"Warsong"	Robert Smith	Songs of a Lost World	Robert Smith; Paul Corkett	2024	
"The Weedy Burton"	Robert Smith; Michael Dempsey; Lol Tolhurst	Three Imaginary Boys	Chris Parry	1979	
"A Wendy Band" #	Robert Smith; Simon Gallup; Perry Bamonte; Porl Thompson; Boris Williams	Wish (Deluxe Edition)	–	2022	
"Wendy Time"	Robert Smith; Simon Gallup; Perry Bamonte; Porl Thompson; Boris Williams	Wish	David M. Allen; The Cure	1992	
"Where the Birds Always Sing"	Robert Smith	Bloodflowers	Robert Smith; Paul Corkett	2000	
"Why Can't I Be Me?"	Robert Smith; Simon Gallup; Perry Bamonte; Roger O'Donnell; Jason Cooper	B-side of "Taking Off"	Robert Smith; Ross Robinson	2004	
"Why Can't I Be You?"	Robert Smith; Simon Gallup; Porl Thompson; Lol Tolhurst; Boris Williams	Kiss Me, Kiss Me, Kiss Me	Robert Smith; David M. Allen	1987	
"Winter"	Robert Smith; Michael Dempsey; Lol Tolhurst	Three Imaginary Boys (Deluxe Edition)	Chris Parry	2004	
"Without You"	Robert Smith; Simon Gallup; Jason Cooper; Porl Thompson	B-side of "The Perfect Boy"	Robert Smith; Keith Uddin	2008	
"World in My Eyes" (Depeche Mode cover)	Martin Gore †	For the Masses	Robert Smith; Paul Corkett	1998	
"World War"	Robert Smith; Michael Dempsey; Lol Tolhurst	Boys Don't Cry	Chris Parry	1980	
"Wrong Number"	Robert Smith	Galore: The Singles 1987–1997	Robert Smith; Mark Saunders; Mark Plati	1997	
"You Stayed ..." ‡ (Robert Smith)	Robert Smith	The Top (Deluxe Edition)	Robert Smith	2006	
"Young Americans" (David Bowie cover)	David Bowie †	104.9 (An XFM Compilation Album)	Robert Smith; Steve Lyon	1995	
"Your God Is Fear"	Robert Smith; Simon Gallup; Perry Bamonte; Roger O'Donnell; Jason Cooper	B-side of "Taking Off"	Robert Smith; Ross Robinson	2004	
