= Galore (The Cure album) =

Greatest hits album by The Cure
- Released: 28 October 1997
- Recorded: 1987–1997
- Length: 72:47
- Labels: Fiction; Elektra

The Cure chronology
Wild Mood Swings (1996)	Galore (1997)	Bloodflowers (2000)

Singles from Galore
- 1. "Wrong Number" Released: 17 November 1997

Galore: The Singles 1987–1997 is the second singles compilation by The Cure and was released on 28 October 1997. It contains singles from the years 1987 to 1997. The song "Wrong Number" is the only new song on the album.

== Release ==
Galore was first released in the US on 28 October 1997 by record label Elektra. It was then released in the UK and Europe by Fiction on 3 November. It spans the singles from the second part of the Cure's career, beginning with their seventh album Kiss Me, Kiss Me, Kiss Me and ending with their tenth album Wild Mood Swings. The Cure introduced the album with two full-length shows in October 1997 at the American Legion Hall in Los Angeles and Irving Plaza in New York City.

Robert Smith has expressed dissatisfaction with the lack of promotion given by their record labels for the release. He spoke on the conflict he had with the record labels in an interview a few years after the compilation's release, saying, "There was hardly any promotion for this album. There were even people in my family who didn't know about this release. The reason for this was a heavy quarrel I had with Polydor and Elektra. They wanted to have songs from Standing On A Beach included on this album plus a few songs from the last decade - a normal Greatest Hits compilation because that would appeal to more people. "Boys Don't Cry" and stuff like that. I didn't want it like this. To me it seemed like an offense to the fans if we included those old songs." "They didn't want to agree to this - they were like naughty little children. If you do it like you want, we won't do any promotion. And I thought, fuck it, then there won't be any promotion. So they pressed the lowest edition they could. Even if this first edition had sold out in Britain in the first week we hadn't cracked the Top 40. There just weren't enough records in stores. I was really pissed by that."

A single, "Wrong Number", was released in United States on 17 November 1997.

== Reception ==
Professional ratings
Review scores
Source	Rating
AllMusic	5/5 stars
Christgau's Consumer Guide	(neither)
The Encyclopedia of Popular Music	3/5 stars
Entertainment Weekly	B
NME	3/10
The Rolling Stone Album Guide	4/5 stars
Spin	7/10
Uncut	3/5 stars

Galore was generally well received by critics. Stephen Thomas Erlewine of AllMusic praised the album, writing "Galore emphatically confirms the Cure's status as one of the best and most adventurous alternative bands of the '80s." A review in Cherwell said Galore was "easier, happier and more productive than anything else they've done" and compared it positively to their first album. Nathan Brackett and Christian Hoard from The Rolling Stone Album Guide wrote that "Galore collects the best of the late Eighties/early Nineties Cure, plus a load of late filler", and were more reserved in their praise, describing the record as a "feeble remix album."

== Track listing ==
All lyrics are written by Robert Smith.

Galore track listing
No.	Title	Music	Original album	Length
1.	"Why Can't I Be You?"	Smith; Simon Gallup; Porl Thompson; Boris Williams; Lol Tolhurst	Kiss Me, Kiss Me, Kiss Me (1987)	3:14
2.	"Catch"	Smith; Gallup; Thompson; Williams; Tolhurst	Kiss Me, Kiss Me, Kiss Me	2:45
3.	"Just Like Heaven" (remix)	Smith; Gallup; Thompson; Williams; Tolhurst	Kiss Me, Kiss Me, Kiss Me	3:32
4.	"Hot Hot Hot!!!" (remix)	Smith; Gallup; Thompson; Williams; Tolhurst	Kiss Me, Kiss Me, Kiss Me	3:35
5.	"Lullaby" (remix)	Smith; Gallup; Thompson; Williams; Roger O'Donnell; Tolhurst	Disintegration (1989)	4:09
6.	"Fascination Street" (remix)	Smith; Gallup; Thompson; Williams; O'Donnell; Tolhurst	Disintegration	4:20
7.	"Lovesong" (remix)	Smith; Gallup; Thompson; Williams; O'Donnell; Tolhurst	Disintegration	3:28
8.	"Pictures of You" (single edit)	Smith; Gallup; Thompson; Williams; O'Donnell; Tolhurst	Disintegration	4:48
9.	"Never Enough" (single mix)	Smith; Gallup; Thompson; William	Mixed Up (1990)	4:28
10.	"Close to Me" (Closest mix)	Smith	Mixed Up	4:21
11.	"High" (single mix)	Smith; Gallup; Thompson; Williams; Perry Bamonte	Wish (1992)	3:33
12.	"Friday I'm in Love"	Smith; Gallup; Thompson; Williams; Bamonte	Wish	3:36
13.	"A Letter to Elise" (7" remix edit)	Smith; Gallup; Thompson; Williams; Bamonte	Wish	4:20
14.	"The 13th" (Swing radio mix)	Smith; Gallup; Bamonte; Jason Cooper; O'Donnell	Wild Mood Swings (1996)	4:17
15.	"Mint Car" (radio mix)	Smith; Gallup; Bamonte; Cooper; O'Donnell	Wild Mood Swings	3:31
16.	"Strange Attraction"	Smith; Gallup; Bamonte; Cooper; O'Donnell	Wild Mood Swings	4:21
17.	"Gone!" (radio mix)	Smith; Gallup; Bamonte; Cooper; O'Donnell	Wild Mood Swings	4:27
18.	"Wrong Number"	Smith	Previously unreleased	6:01
Total length:				72:47

== Personnel ==
- Robert Smith – vocals, guitar, production
- Simon Gallup – bass guitar
- Porl Thompson – guitar
- Boris Williams – drums
- Roger O'Donnell – keyboards
- Lol Tolhurst - drums, keyboards
- Perry Bamonte – keyboard, guitar
- Jason Cooper – drums, percussion

Production

- Mark Saunders – production, engineering, mixing
- Steve Lyon – production, mixing
- Chris Parry – mixing
- Adrian Sherwood – mixing
- David M. Allen – production
- Stuart Hawkes – remastering at Metropolis Mastering

== Charts ==
Chart performance for Galore
Chart (1997)	Peak position
Australian Albums (ARIA)	45
Dutch Albums (Album Top 100)	81
German Albums (Offizielle Top 100)	51
New Zealand Albums (RMNZ)	31
Swedish Albums (Sverigetopplistan)	54
UK Albums (Official Charts)	37
US Billboard 200	32

== Certifications ==
Certifications for Galore
Region	Certification	Certified units/sales
Australia (ARIA)	Gold	35,000^{^}
United Kingdom (BPI)	Silver	60,000^{^}
United States (RIAA)	Gold	500,000^{^}
^{^} Shipments figures based on certification alone.

== See also ==
- Standing on a Beach – The Cure's first decade-spanning singles collection, for the years 1978–1985
