= COGASM =

Musical group

COGASM is a side project of singer and guitarist Robert Smith and drummer Jason Cooper of The Cure, and guitarist Reeves Gabrels. The first two letters of the members' surnames were taken to form the group's name, which is properly spelled with all capital letters. The band was put together for the one-time purpose of creating a song for the soundtrack to the movie Orgazmo.

The single "A Sign From God" appeared on the Orgazmo soundtrack in 1998. The song "Wrong Number" was recorded at the same session but was instead credited to the Cure and released on the band's 1997 compilation album Galore.
