= Strange Attraction =

1996 single by The Cure

Single by The Cure

from the album Wild Mood Swings
- Released: 8 October 1996
- Recorded: 1995
- Genre: Synth pop
- Length: 4:20
- Label: Elektra
- Composers: Perry Bamonte, Simon Gallup, Robert Smith, and Jason Cooper
- Lyricist: Robert Smith
- Producers: Robert Smith; Steve Lyon

The Cure singles chronology
"Mint Car" (1996)	"Strange Attraction" (1996)	"Gone!" (1996)

"Strange Attraction" is the third single released by the English rock band the Cure on their tenth studio album Wild Mood Swings (1996). It was only released on Elektra Records as a single in the United States and Australia on 8 October 1996.

== History ==
No music video was filmed to promote the single, believed to be because Robert Smith felt the last video for a single release exclusively in the US, "Fascination Street", was not what the band were aiming for. Because of that "Strange Attraction" remains the only The Cure single (not counting original mix of "Boys Don't Cry") without a music video. Every other single made by the band has received a music video.

== Reception ==
Chris Gerard of Metro Weekly dismissed the song as "one of the band’s weaker attempts at a pop hit", Aidin Vaziri of Houston Chronicle called it "light synthesizer pop"Trouser Press called the song "a disappointing romance with a letter-writing fan — stands out for sharing subtle and credible emotions in a most attractive setting."

== Track listing ==
1. "Strange Attraction [Adrian Sherwood Album Mix]"
2. "The 13th" [Feels Good Mix]
3. "This is a Lie" [Ambient Mix]
4. "Gone!" [Critter Mix]
5. "Strange Attraction" [Strange Mix]

== Personnel ==
The Cure

- Robert Smith – vocals, guitar
- Simon Gallup – bass
- Perry Bamonte – keyboards
- Roger O'Donnell – keyboards
- Jason Cooper – drums

Technical

- Steve Lyon – production, engineering
- Robert Smith – production
- Adrian Maxwell Sherwood – mixing
- Ian Cooper – mastering

== Charts ==
Chart (1996)	Peak position
Australia (ARIA)	145
