= Gone! (The Cure song) =

Single by The Cure

from the album Wild Mood Swings
- Released: 2 December 1996
- Recorded: 1995
- Genre: Jazz
- Length: 4:25
- Label: Fiction
- Composers: Bamonte, Cooper, Gallup, O'Donnell and Smith
- Lyricist: Smith
- Producers: Robert Smith; Steve Lyon

The Cure singles chronology
"Strange Attraction" (1996)	"Gone!" (1996)	"Wrong Number" (1997)

"Gone!" is a song by English rock band The Cure, released as the fourth and final single from their tenth studio album Wild Mood Swings (1996) and was released on 2 December 1996. The single contained numerous remixes as B-sides.

The song did not achieve commercial success, reaching number 60 on the UK Singles Chart, and was played infrequently at concerts, despite the band having performed it on Later with Jools Holland.

== Music video ==
A video was recorded for the song at a live concert in Los Angeles in August 1996.

== Reception ==
In an overview of the band's career, Clash magazine said that, alongside "The 13th", "Gone!" has become known for dividing fans, describing them as "love/hate affairs", but noted they "still [show] a band happy to experiment and play with conventions." Peter Parrish of Stylus Magazine described "Gone!" as containing an "um-pa-pa horn action and rinky-dink keyboards."Metro Weekly dismissed the song as "particularly atrocious" and "a throwaway".PopMatters described the song as "groovy freak funk"

== Track listing ==
CD 1

1. "Gone! (Radio Mix)"
2. "The 13th (Feels Good Mix)"
3. "This Is a Lie (Ambient Mix)"
4. "Strange Attraction (Strange Mix)"

CD 2

1. "Gone! (Radio Mix)"
2. "Gone! (Critter Mix)"
3. "Gone! (Ultra Living Mix)"
4. "Gone! (Spacer Mix)"

== Personnel ==
The Cure

- Robert Smith – vocals, guitar, brass arrangements
- Simon Gallup – bass
- Perry Bamonte – keyboards
- Roger O'Donnell – keyboards
- Jason Cooper – drums

Additional personnel

- John Barclay – trumpet
- Richard Edwards – trombone
- Will Gregory – saxophone and brass arrangements
- Steve Sidwell – trumpet

Technical

- Steve Lyon – production, engineering, mixing
- Robert Smith – production, mixing
- Ian Cooper – mastering
