= The 13th =

1996 single by The Cure

Single by the Cure

from the album Wild Mood Swings
- B-side: "It Used to Be Me"; "Ocean"; "Adonais"
- Released: 22 April 1996
- Genre: Mariachi
- Length: 4:16
- Label: Fiction
- Composers: Perry Bamonte; Jason Cooper; Simon Gallup; Roger O'Donnell; Robert Smith
- Lyricist: Robert Smith
- Producers: Robert Smith; Steve Lyon

The Cure singles chronology
"A Letter to Elise" (1992)	"The 13th" (1996)	"Mint Car" (1996)

"The 13th" is a song by English rock band the Cure, released as the first single from the band's 10th studio album, Wild Mood Swings (1996), on 22 April 1996. The song reached the top 20 in several territories, including Finland, Sweden, the United Kingdom, and Wallonia. It charted the highest in Hungary, where it reached number two, and in Italy, where it peaked at number five.

== Background ==
Bassist Simon Gallup discussed the creation of the track in a contemporary interview, "That was one of Robert's songs, initially called Two Chord Cool. because it was just two chords strummed on a guitar. It was one of the songs we had recorded; we kept adding bits of percussion and then we'd put it away and then add more to it." he also viewed the song as "tacky" and "tongue-in-cheek".

== Release ==
The song reached number 15 on the UK Singles Chart and number 44 on the US Billboard Hot 100. The song was played very few times during the Swing Tour and never again since the tour.

== Reception ==
Writing for AllMusic, Ned Raggett rated the single four stars out of five and noted the unexpected tone of the song: "There's no question that 'The 13th' was probably one of the Cure's most unexpected singles -- though horns had appeared on the single mix of 'Close to Me' back in 1985, the distinctly Latin percussion and brass on the song here was something else entirely!"

Clash magazine said that, alongside "Gone!", "The 13th" has become known for dividing fans, describing them as "love/hate affairs", but noted they "still [show] a band happy to experiment and play with conventions." Peter Parrish described "The 13th" as "a pseudo-latin number with a not-especially-hidden message about giving in to your lust."

== Music video ==
The music video of the song shows Robert Smith, dressed in burned and ripped ruffled shirt, lying on a bed in a cheap motel room and watching a TV broadcast where he performs with the Cure. Comedian Sean Hughes also appears in the video.

== Track listings ==
All tracks were written by Smith, Gallup, Bamonte, Cooper, and O'Donnell.

UK CD1 and Australian CD single

1. "The 13th" (swing radio mix)
2. "It Used to Be Me"
3. "The 13th" (Killer Bee mix)

UK CD2

1. "The 13th" (Two Chord Cool mix)
2. "Ocean"
3. "Adonais"

European CD and cassette single

1. "The 13th" (swing radio mix)
2. "It Used to Be Me"

US CD1 and cassette single

1. "The 13th" (swing radio mix)
2. "Adonais"

US CD2 and Canadian CD single

1. "The 13th" (Two Chord Cool mix)
2. "Ocean"
3. "It Used to Be Me"
4. "The 13th" (Killer Bee mix)

Japanese CD single

1. "The 13th" (swing radio mix)
2. "It Used to Be Me"
3. "Ocean"
4. "Adonais"

== Personnel ==
The Cure

- Robert Smith – vocals, guitar, trumpet arrangements
- Simon Gallup – bass
- Perry Bamonte – guitar
- Roger O'Donnell – keyboards
- Jason Cooper – drums, percussion

Additional musicians

- Jesus Alemany – trumpet
- Steve Dawson – trumpet
- Sid Gauld – trumpet arrangements

Technical

- Steve Lyon – production, engineering
- Robert Smith – production
- Spike Drake – mixing
- Ian Cooper – mastering

== Charts ==
Chart (1996)	Peak position
Australia (ARIA)	31
Belgium (Ultratop 50 Flanders)	43
Belgium (Ultratop 50 Wallonia)	12
Canada Rock/Alternative (RPM)	17
Europe (Eurochart Hot 100)	30
Finland (Suomen virallinen lista)	11
Germany (GfK)	55
Hungary (Mahasz)	2
Ireland (IRMA)	22
Italy (Musica e dischi)	5
New Zealand (Recorded Music NZ)	37
Scottish Singles Sales (Official Charts)	23
Sweden (Sverigetopplistan)	20
Switzerland (Schweizer Hitparade)	29
UK Singles (Official Charts)	15
US Billboard Hot 100	44
US Alternative Airplay (Billboard)	15
US Dance Singles Sales (Billboard)	11
US Cash Box Top 100	47

== Release history ==
Region	Date	Format(s)	Label(s)	Ref(s).
United States	8 April 1996	Triple A; college; alternative radio	Elektra; Fiction	
United Kingdom	22 April 1996	CD; cassette	Fiction	
United States	23 April 1996	CD; cassette	Elektra; Fiction	
United States	29 April 1996	Top 40 radio	Elektra; Fiction	
Japan	1 June 1996	CD	Polydor; Fiction	
