= A Letter to Elise =

1992 single by the Cure

Single by the Cure

from the album Wish
- B-side: "The Big Hand"; "A Foolish Arrangement"
- Released: 5 October 1992
- Length: 5:12
- Label: Fiction
- Songwriters: Perry Bamonte; Boris Williams; Simon Gallup; Robert Smith; Porl Thompson
- Producers: David Allen; the Cure

The Cure singles chronology
| "Friday I'm in Love" (1992) | "A Letter to Elise" (1992) | "The 13th" (1996) |

"A Letter to Elise" is a song by English rock band the Cure, released on 5 October 1992 by Fiction Records as the third and final single from their ninth album, Wish (1992). In 2010, Pitchfork Media ranked it at number 184 on their list of "The Top 200 Tracks of the 1990s".

== Background ==
"A Letter to Elise" was made public for the first time on MTV's Cure-"Unplugged" show in 1991 and had very different lyrics from the later version to be released as a 7". Letters to Felice by Kafka was a huge influence when Robert Smith wrote the lyrics of the track.

The B-side "The Big Hand" was planned as an A-side single early in 1993 but the idea was scrapped, largely due to Boris Williams not wanting the track to appear on the album but having no qualms about it appearing as a B-side (from KROQ radio interview with the band in 1992). "The Big Hand" is one of the few B-sides to be played live, although very rarely. It was first played in 1991, performed a few times during the Wish Tour in 1992, then revived at the Ultra Music Festival in 2007, and was occasionally played during the band's 4Tour World Tour 2007–08.

A promo version of the song features yet another longer unreleased mix, with phaser on Robert Smith's voice. An instrumental version on cassette is also known to exist.

"A Letter to Elise" itself was revived by the band's new Smith/Gallup/Thompson/Cooper lineup in 2005 after being played sparingly, if ever, during the Smith/Gallup/Bamonte/Cooper/O'Donnell era.

== Track listings ==
7-inch vinyl
| No. | Title | Length |
|---|---|---|
| 1. | "A Letter to Elise" (7-inch remix edit) | 4:20 |
| 2. | "The Big Hand" | 4:52 |

12-inch vinyl
| No. | Title | Length |
|---|---|---|
| 1. | "A Letter to Elise" (Blue mix) | 6:37 |
| 2. | "The Big Hand" | 4:56 |
| 3. | "A Foolish Arrangement" | 3:54 |

CD
| No. | Title | Length |
|---|---|---|
| 1. | "A Letter to Elise" (7-inch remix edit) | 4:24 |
| 2. | "The Big Hand" | 4:56 |
| 3. | "A Foolish Arrangement" | 3:54 |
| 4. | "A Letter to Elise" (Blue mix) | 6:37 |

== Personnel ==
- Robert Smith – guitar, keyboard, vocals, 6 string bass
- Perry Bamonte – 6 string bass, guitar, keyboard
- Simon Gallup – bass
- Porl Thompson – guitar
- Boris Williams – percussion, drums

== Charts ==
Weekly chart performance for "A Letter to Elise"
| Chart (1992) | Peak position |
|---|---|
| Australia (ARIA) | 103 |
| Ireland (IRMA) | 23 |
| New Zealand (Recorded Music NZ) | 13 |
| Sweden (Sverigetopplistan) | 39 |
| UK Singles (Official Charts) | 28 |
| UK Airplay (Music Week) | 46 |
| US Alternative Airplay (Billboard) | 2 |

== Release history ==
Release dates and formats for "A Letter to Elise"
| Region | Date | Format(s) | Label(s) | Ref. |
|---|---|---|---|---|
| United Kingdom | 5 October 1992 | 7-inch vinyl; 12-inch vinyl; CD; cassette | Fiction | |
| Australia | 26 October 1992 | CD; cassette | Fiction | |
| Japan | 5 December 1992 | CD | Fiction | |
