= Wild Mood Swings =

1996 studio album by the Cure

Studio album by the Cure
- Released: 6 May 1996
- Recorded: Late 1994–1996
- Studios: St Catherine's Court (Bath, England); Haremere Hall (Etchingham, England)
- Genres: Alternative rock; neo-psychedelia
- Length: 61:36
- Label: Fiction
- Producers: Steve Lyon; Robert Smith

The Cure chronology
Paris (1993)	Wild Mood Swings (1996)	Galore (1997)

Singles from Wild Mood Swings
- 1. "The 13th" Released: 22 April 1996; 2. "Mint Car" Released: 17 June 1996; 3. "Strange Attraction" Released: 8 October 1996; 4. "Gone!" Released: 2 December 1996

Wild Mood Swings is the tenth studio album by the English rock band the Cure, released on 6 May 1996 by Fiction Records. The album charted at number nine on the UK Albums Chart, staying on the chart for six weeks, and number 12 on the US Billboard 200. However, the album was the lowest-selling Cure album in 12 years, and it marked the beginning of a downward trend in the Cure's future album sales.

Four singles were released from the album, the first being "The 13th", released in 22 April 1996, followed by "Mint Car" released on 17 June, "Strange Attraction" released in United States on 8 October and "Gone!" released in Europe on 2 December 1996.

The album saw the band explore various styles, similar to their double album Kiss Me Kiss Me Kiss Me (1987), incorporating jangle pop with "Mint Car" and "Return", jazz with "Gone!" and mariachi with "The 13th". Robert Smith said the album title came from the fact that "Lyrically and musically, we cover more stuff than we have done in the past." The album exhibits jarring track placements, which contribute to the erratic and eclectic nature of the material, from lighter poppier songs to introspective, darker material, often paired next to one another, which NME described as, "rather like a compilation album, with all the disjointedness that implies".

== Background ==
Wild Mood Swings was an album that saw various different changes towards the way the band approached recording their songs, such as the prominent use of computers and music software like Cubase, as well as live strings and brass instrumentation. It was also the first album released since drummer Boris Williams left the band for personal reasons in 1994 while guitarist Porl Thompson also left the group in 1993 to look after his children and joined English rock band Page and Plant.

Smith felt at the time that the previous line-up that had made Wish (1992) had "really done as much as we could. In some ways, in the back of my mind, I was slightly unsure as to what we could achieve, because we all knew each other so well. So the fact that it all kind of fell apart was a good thing. It was one of those haphazard, serendipitous things that worked in our favour."

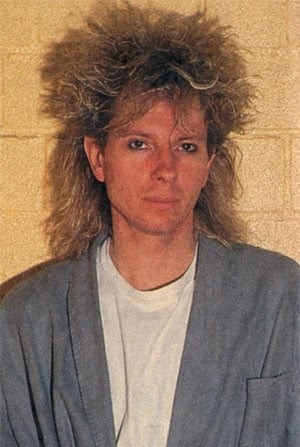
Drummer Boris Williams quit the band for personal reasons. He was joined by Porl Thompson and formed the band Babacar in the late 90s.

However, Smith found it difficult to replace Boris Williams as he felt he was "a phenomenally good drummer," and found "replacing him was the most difficult thing. Not only did we have to find someone who would fit, who would get on with us and understand what the Cure is about, [he] also had to be as good a drummer as Boris, and it took months finding someone." Jason Cooper, formerly of the band My Life Story, replaced Williams on drums in 1995, answering to a Melody Maker advertisement made by the band anonymously with the brief "…famous group requires drummer – no metal heads…". Prior to Cooper's recruitment, other potential drummers included Ron Austin (The God Machine), Mark Price (All About Eve), and Louis Pavlou (Pink Turns Blue). All three drummers ultimately appeared on Wild Mood Swings. Perry Bamonte replaced Porl Thompson as the group's lead guitarist, leaving Roger O'Donnell, who returned in 1995 after leaving in 1990, to fulfil keyboard parts.

The album marked the first time the band did not work with David M. Allen as a producer since Japanese Whispers (1983). Robert Smith feared "that nothing new" would happen, had they worked with him again, saying "We've never really needed anyone to help on the creative or artistic side" and opted to get Steve Lyon, due to his younger age and his lack of "any preconceptions about the group."

The track "Club America", is inspired by a summer trip in 1994 that Smith had to New York with Perry Bamonte to watch the Football World Cup. After playing football with electronic band Depeche Mode and Daryl Bamonte, brother of Perry who would go on to work with the Cure shortly after, they all went clubbing. Smith admitted to playing "up to it then an awful lot more than I should have, and on the plane home, I wrote the song, because I was trying to, like, explain it away to myself. It's ironic, you know. I've had this photo taken with these celebrities, and I was there, and I did that, and I was full of self loathing! And that song is not anti-the girl in the "canary feather dress," it's actually anti-me because I was part of it." Rolling Stone noted Smith's put-on deeper voice on the song, citing borrowed "vocal tricks" from David Bowie and Iggy Pop, while also describing the sound as "upbeat" and that its sound invoked the "jaded thrills of nightclubbing in the American fun house." Meanwhile, Spin felt the song resembled English rock band Happy Mondays, due to its psychedelic sound and NME compared it unfavourably to Tin Machine.

The song "Treasure" is inspired by the Christina Rossetti poem "Remember". Smith felt that the most personal songs on the album were "Want" and "Bare".

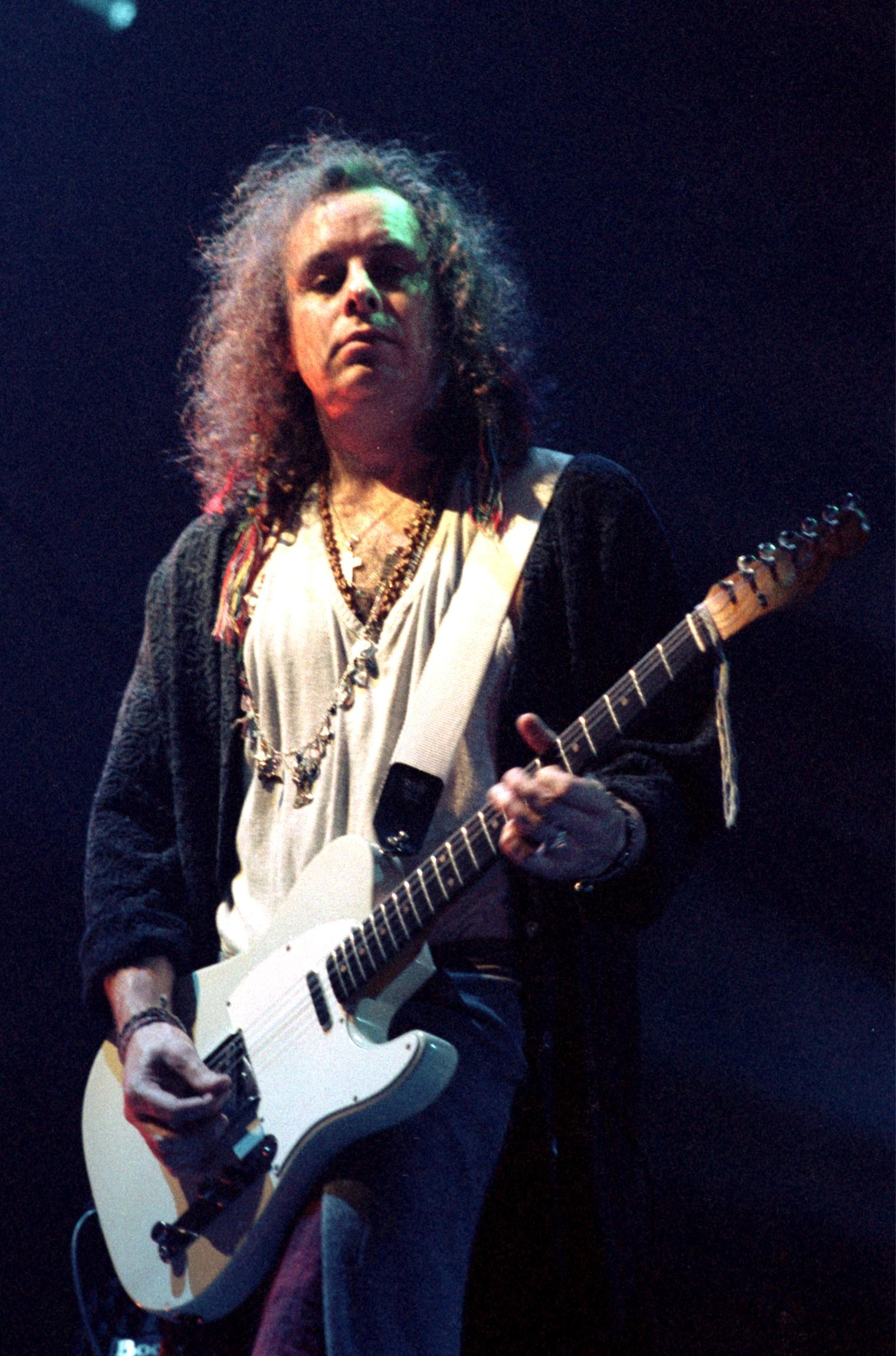
Porl Thomspon left the band in 1993 to look after his children and joined the English rock band Page and Plant. According to Robert Smith, his departure was not "acrimonious". He would rejoin the band in 2005.

=== Recording ===
Initial recording began around the end of 1994, with just Robert Smith and Perry Bamonte. Simon Gallup fell ill shortly before the band scheduled to record and Boris Williams left the band the day before they began recording, and other members had yet to be found. The following year Roger O'Donnell and Jason Cooper would be hired.

The band settled in St. Catherine's Court, a Tudor house that was owned by actress Jane Seymour at the time, and were the first band to record there, since she began renting it out as a film set and recording studio since 1992. Other bands and musicians who would record there include Radiohead, for their acclaimed album OK Computer (1997), Robbie Williams and New Order. The band themselves would return there for the initial 1998 sessions of the follow-up album Bloodflowers (2000).

Alongside many other changes to the band's working methods, they opted to use live brass instruments and string quartets in their songs, something that had previously not occurred in their recording processes. Strings would see use most notably on "This Is a Lie", which started out as a song based around an acoustic guitar played by Perry Bamonte. Smith recalled, "when I started playing around with it, it evolved into a string piece on the keyboard. I always had in mind that we'd be using strings, right from the very outset." He said recording in the house helped as "there was an instant atmosphere" for the string quartets. The band chose Audrey Riley's string quartet for the album as Smith felt she was "very aware of recording for contemporary pop" and that he had difficulties with previous musicians.

Smith said the band also used an Indian orchestra, a jazz quartet and Mexican trumpet players, and clarified "Everything on the album is real. In the past, I would have tried to keep it in the family, so to speak, and tried to attain a realistic sound through emulation or simulation. Now I feel much more comfortable having people around who are really good musicians."

The whole band were given much more input on the songs, allowing their ideas to be tested for inclusion "no matter how silly it was". Smith felt at the time, "It was the most fun I've ever had making a record, actually; it was brilliant. And that's why it took quite a long time, 'cause no one wanted it to stop. It was really good fun. We were paying for ourselves to live together in a house and make music, so why should we stop? Why should we go home?"

"It's been so relaxed here. There wasn't a deadline, so we kept pushing it back. It's comfortable and big enough that you can get away from everybody else — so everyone's not on top of each other."

— Roger O'Donnell discussing the album's recording environment.

The mastering of the album was complete at Metropolis Studios, London with Robert Smith alongside Ian Cooper, who was suggested to Smith by producer Flood. This made for the first time Smith would be directly involved with the mastering process, which was due to his frustration towards being absent on the band's previous albums' mastering.

== Sleeve design and art direction ==
The album art features a toy clown. This toy motif would become a recurring theme for all of the related sleeve designs, such as the sleeve art for the singles released for the album. Bassist Simon Gallup discussed the origin to the cover and motif in a contemporary interview: "Robert had this catalogue of toys from Germany. He sent away for these different types of metal toys. They're actually really sharp on the edges and bizarre things like these cars you wind up. The clown is really quite frightening. When we were recording, we had all these toys put over our amps and things. We thought they were such bizarre images that we tried to incorporate them into the record sleeve."

The band's website featured St Catherine's Court, which was titled "The Cure's House". This also came with an interactive game that gave all of the band members rooms.

== Reception ==
Professional ratings
Review scores
Source	Rating
AllMusic	3/5 stars
Chicago Sun-Times	2.5/4 stars
Entertainment Weekly	B
The Guardian	2/5 stars
Houston Chronicle	4/5 stars
Los Angeles Times	2.5/4 stars
NME	7/10
Rolling Stone	2/5 stars
Spin	6/10
USA Today	3/4 stars

Wild Mood Swings received a mixed response from critics. A favourable review came from Trouser Press, which described the album as "a potent and sweeping dissertation on melancholy and tentative dreams denied", calling it "consistently compelling". However, the album was the lowest-selling Cure album in 12 years, and it marked the beginning of a downward trend in the Cure's future album sales.

=== Contemporary ===
Aidin Vaziri of the Houston Chronicle claimed the band were "not even close to losing its creative edge" and praised the lighter tone of the album compared to the band's earlier output, writing that "the group sounds remarkably accessible. The Cure is just as relevant now as it was when it was paving the way for the modern rock revolution. The only challenge is getting the die-hard fans to set aside the black lipstick, tune in and lighten up."

James Hannaham of Spin observed, "Smith and the Cure remain fixated on cheap thrills throughout Wild Mood Swings. They try on degraded versions of rock genre as deftly as they put on their makeup and lipstick" and felt, "Smith's three-note hooks never sounded less catchy, and the occasional arena-rock pretensions the band displays don't exactly hit home." He concluded, "Wild Mood Swings is the album you'd expect from the Cure if they'd suddenly become filthy rich, got drunk and high all the time, and had a midlife crisis."

Edna Gundersen of USA Today praised the album's sound, giving it three out of four stars, calling it "a fun and deliberately trashy celebration of life's pleasures. On 'Want', he expresses uncorked desire for "more fun, more pain, more flesh, more stars, and 'Mint Car' finds him chirping happily about romance. Moods do shift wildly, from a salsa-flavored 'The 13th', horn-pumped 'Return' and zippy 'Gone!' to trademark Cure downers like 'Bare' and 'Numb'. The album is uneven, but highlights outweigh the low points on this bipolar flight of fancy."

When Gallup was asked in an interview if he was looking forward to touring considering the album's mixed reception, he responded: "Reviews really don't bother us. We feel very much at home now that the British press hate us once again. We found it a bit disconcerting when we released Wish and we were suddenly the British journalists' favourite band."

Smith's initial response to the poorer reception was one of surprise: "I have been surprised at the differences of opinion with regards to Wild Mood Swings, because I think it’s really good." He also said that the variety and strength of the material made it "the best thing we've done". He felt confident in the album from the early stages of its creation, finding most of the criticism was illogical, saying that most critics complained "that it sounds like The Cure", and believed the media perceived the band as out of touch with contemporary music, which amused him "because I'm a consumer, as well. I buy records. I listen to music. I know very well what's going on. But the hilarity is, had we come back and released a jungle album, and tried to be very '90s, it would have been completely absurd. I mean, we listen to jungle backstage, but I can't really see us playing it. To me, it's like I've never felt that we're in competition with other people. I've always thought that we just offer another choice."

=== Retrospective ===
In a 2004 interview with Rolling Stone, however, Smith's opinion changed, saying of the album's poor reception, "The album suffers from being too long. And it's disjointed. I was trying to write in different styles, and wanted us to sound like different bands, almost going after the Kiss Me idea. But, because we'd lost Boris [Williams], and before Jason [Cooper] settled in, we had a different drummer every week. I would often forget the name of the person who was drumming." Smith felt that after Wish he "got that sense of fun back. And it shows in the album; there are some pretty demented songs on there. But it was a shame, because it got slagged when it came out. Fans hated it as well. It's the only time I've been hugely disappointed." He believed that fans were unsatisfied with the lead single "The 13th" due to its "sort of crackpot salsa feel".

Stephen Thomas Erlewine of AllMusic noted the album's variety, commenting: "After the relatively straightforward pop of Wish, the Cure moved back toward stranger, edgier territory with Wild Mood Swings... As the title suggests, there's a vast array of textures and emotions on Wild Mood Swings, from the woozy mariachi lounge horns of 'The 13th' to the perfect pop of 'Mint Car' and the monolithic dirge of 'Want.'" He praised the album's variety, saying that the band "explore some simpler territory, from contemplative acoustic numbers tinged with strings to swooning neo-psychedelia." He concluded "but the variety of sounds and strength of performance offers enough surprises to make Wild Mood Swings more than just another Cure record."

Chris Gerard of Metro Weekly gave a mixed perspective. "There is no disputing the power of the album’s opener, though", praising the song "Want", which he believed to be one of the band's strongest works. "Starting with a swirling guitar riff and then building slowly in intensity as it goes, 'Want' is another in a long line of powerhouse opening tracks on Cure albums." He also felt that the single choices were poor and led to the album's poor reception. However he believed that "certain B-Sides would've provided a much better collection of songs with the exclusion of some album tracks", and concluded that the album "didn't have to be the commercial and critical disaster that it turned out to be. The core of a great album is there—it's just a matter of joining the right dots."

Michael Gallucci of Diffuser.fm gave an unenthusiastic review, saying "A tired, and often bored, mood drifts through Wild Mood Swings. It's not even the gloom-and-doom lethargy we usually get from the band. Rather, Smith and the group can't muster much enthusiasm for the songs", while also saying "The few times the band sparks to life are the few times it seems to latch onto a groove: 'Strange Attraction', 'Mint Car', 'Gone!'."

== Track listing ==
All lyrics are written by Robert Smith; all music is composed by Perry Bamonte, Jason Cooper, Simon Gallup, Roger O'Donnell, and Smith.

No.	Title	Length
1.	"Want"	5:06
2.	"Club America"	5:02
3.	"This Is a Lie"	4:29
4.	"The 13th"	4:08
5.	"Strange Attraction"	4:19
6.	"Mint Car"	3:32
7.	"Jupiter Crash"	4:15
8.	"Round & Round & Round"	2:39
9.	"Gone!"	4:31
10.	"Numb"	4:49
11.	"Return"	3:28
12.	"Trap"	3:37
13.	"Treasure"	3:45
14.	"Bare"	7:57

Japanese edition bonus track
No.	Title	Length
15.	"It Used to Be Me" (available worldwide as the B-side of "The 13th" single)	6:50

== Personnel ==
The Cure

- Robert Smith – vocals, guitar, six-string bass, string and brass arrangements, production, sleeve art direction, mixing on "Jupiter Crash", "Round & Round & Round", "Gone!", "Treasure", and "Bare"
- Perry Bamonte – guitar, six-string bass, sleeve art direction
- Jason Cooper – drums, percussion (except on "This is a Lie", "Club America", "Mint Car", "Trap" and "Treasure"), sleeve art direction
- Simon Gallup – bass guitar, sleeve art direction
- Roger O'Donnell – keyboard, sleeve art direction

Additional personnel

- Jesus Alemany – trumpet on "The 13th"
- John Barclay – trumpet on "Return" and "Gone!"
- Steve Dawson – trumpet on "The 13th"
- Richard Edwards – trombone on "Return" and "Gone!"
- Sid Gauld – trumpet and brass arrangements on "The 13th"
- Will Gregory – saxophone and brass arrangements on "Return" and "Gone!"
- Steve Sidwell – trumpet on "Return" and "Gone!"
- Mister Chandrashekhar – violin on "Numb"
- Sue Dench – viola on "Want", "This Is a Lie", "Round & Round & Round", "Numb", "Treasure", and "Bare"
- Leo Payne – violin on "Want", "This Is a Lie", "Round & Round & Round", "Numb", "Treasure", and "Bare"
- Audrey Riley – cello and string arrangements on "Want", "This Is a Lie", "Round & Round & Round", "Numb", "Treasure", and "Bare"
- Chris Tombling – violin on "Want", "This Is a Lie", "Round & Round & Round", "Numb", "Treasure", and "Bare"
- Ronald Austin – drums on "This is a Lie"
- Louis Pavlou – drums on "Club America"
- Mark Price – drums on "Mint Car", "Trap" and "Treasure"

Technical

- Steve Lyon – production, engineering, mixing on "Jupiter Crash", "Round & Round & Round", "Gone!", "Treasure" and "Bare"
- Alan Moulder – mixing on "Want"
- Paul Q. Kolderie – mixing on "Club America"
- Sean Slade – mixing on "Club America"
- Tim Palmer – mixing on "This Is a Lie"
- Spike Drake – mixing on "The 13th" and "Numb"
- Adrian Maxwell Sherwood – mixing on "Strange Attraction"
- Paul Corkett – mixing on "Mint Car"
- Mark Saunders – mixing on "Return"
- Tom Lord-Alge – mixing on "Trap"
- Ian Cooper – mastering
- Andy Vella – sleeve art direction

== Charts ==
=== Weekly charts ===
Weekly chart performance for Wild Mood Swings
Chart (1996)	Peak position
Australian Albums (ARIA)	5
Austrian Albums (Ö3 Austria)	12
Belgian Albums (Ultratop Flanders)	13
Belgian Albums (Ultratop Wallonia)	5
Canada Top Albums/CDs (RPM)	11
Danish Albums (Hitlisten)	17
Dutch Albums (Album Top 100)	37
European Albums (Music & Media)	7
Finnish Albums (Suomen virallinen lista)	24
French Albums (SNEP)	27
German Albums (Offizielle Top 100)	17
Hungarian Albums (MAHASZ)	17
Italian Albums (FIMI)	6
New Zealand Albums (RMNZ)	10
Norwegian Albums (VG-lista)	13
Portuguese Albums (AFP)	6
Scottish Albums (Official Charts)	46
Spanish Albums (AFYVE)	18
Swedish Albums (Sverigetopplistan)	2
Swiss Albums (Schweizer Hitparade)	9
UK Albums (Official Charts)	9
US Billboard 200	12

=== Year-end charts ===
Year-end chart performance for Wild Mood Swings
Chart (1996)	Position
European Albums (Music & Media)	91

== Certifications ==
Certifications for Wild Mood Swings
Region	Certification	Certified units/sales
United States (RIAA)	Gold	500,000^{^}
^{^} Shipments figures based on certification alone.
