= Mint Car =

1996 single by The Cure

- CD1 single cover

Single by the Cure

from the album Wild Mood Swings
- B-side: "Home"; "Waiting"; "A Pink Dream"
- Released: 17 June 1996
- Genre: Jangle pop
- Length: 3:29
- Label: Fiction; Elektra
- Composers: Robert Smith; Simon Gallup; Perry Bamonte; Jason Cooper; Roger O'Donnell
- Lyricist: Robert Smith
- Producers: Robert Smith; Steve Lyon

The Cure singles chronology
"The 13th" (1996)	"Mint Car" (1996)	"Strange Attraction" (1996)

Alternative covers
- CD2 single cover

Audio
- "Mint Car" on YouTube

"Mint Car" is a song by English rock band the Cure, released in June 1996 by Fiction and Elektra Records as the second single from their tenth studio album, Wild Mood Swings (1996). It reached the top 20 in Finland and Iceland and peaked at number 31 on the UK Singles Chart.

== Background ==
Robert Smith has stated in an interview that he thought this song was better than the British top-10 hit "Friday I'm in Love". Smith said, "it was the single, and I thought it was a better song than 'Friday'. But it did absolutely nothing because we weren't the band at that time. The zeitgeist wasn't right. It taught me that sometimes there's a tipping point, and if you're the band, you're the band, even if you don't want to be, and there's nothing you can do about it."

== Release ==
Released on 17 June 1996, the song reached number 31 on the UK Singles Chart and number 14 on the Billboard Modern Rock Tracks chart. The single includes two remixes of the song, as well as three songs not available on the album. The "Busker's Mix" includes the acoustic guitar parts but omits electric guitar tracks. The "Electric Mix" contains the electric guitar parts, but leaves out the acoustic guitar. All of the B-sides, except the remixes, would go on to appear in the 2004 box set Join the Dots.

== Critical reception ==
Chris Gerard of Metro Weekly was unenthusiastic of the song saying it was "utterly inconsequential" and "a pale imitation of far better guitar-based pop songs like "In Between Days" and “Friday I'm in Love.”Anthony DeCurtis of Rolling Stone dismissed it as "shiny, happy, self-consciously clichéd"

== Track listings ==
All tracks were written by Robert Smith, Simon Gallup, Perry Bamonte, Jason Cooper, and Roger O'Donnell.

UK CD1

1. "Mint Car"
2. "Home"
3. "Mint Car" (Buskers mix)

UK CD2

1. "Mint Car" (Electric mix)
2. "Waiting"
3. "A Pink Dream"

European CD1 and Australian CD single

1. "Mint Car" (radio mix)
2. "Home"
3. "Waiting"
4. "A Pink Dream"

European CD2 and US CD1

1. "Mint Car" (radio mix)
2. "Home"

US CD2 and Canadian CD single

1. "Mint Car" (Electric mix)
2. "Waiting"
3. "A Pink Dream"
4. "Mint Car" (Buskers Mix)

== Personnel ==
- Robert Smith – writing, vocals, guitar, production, mixing
- Simon Gallup – writing, bass
- Perry Bamonte – writing, guitar
- Jason Cooper – writing
- Roger O'Donnell – writing, keyboards
- Mark Price – drums
- Bob Thompson – drums on "Waiting"
- Steve Lyon – production, mixing on all tracks except "A Pink Dream"
- Steve Whitfield – mixing on "A Pink Dream"

== Charts ==
=== Weekly charts ===
Chart (1996)	Peak position
Australia (ARIA)	100
Canada Rock/Alternative (RPM)	17
Finland (Suomen virallinen lista)	20
Iceland (Íslenski Listinn Topp 40)	3
Scottish Singles Sales (Official Charts)	47
UK Singles (Official Charts)	31
US Billboard Hot 100	58
US Alternative Airplay (Billboard)	14
US Cash Box Top 100	58

=== Year-end charts ===
Chart (1996)	Position
Iceland (Íslenski Listinn Topp 40)	13
US Modern Rock Tracks (Billboard)	75

== Release history ==
Region	Date	Format(s)	Label(s)	Ref.
United States	27 May 1996	Alternative radio	Fiction; Elektra	
United Kingdom	17 June 1996	CD; cassette	Fiction	
United States	18 June 1996	Contemporary hit radio	Fiction; Elektra	
