= My Life Story =

English pop group

- My Life Story in 2009

Background information
- Origin: Camden Town, London, England
- Genres: Pop; electropop; dance-pop; dance-rock
- Years active: 1993–present
- Labels: Mother Tongue; Parlophone; it; Exilophone; Universal Music Group
- Members: Jake Shillingford; Nick Evans; Chris Hardwick; Jack Hosgood; Aimee Smith
- Past members: Aaron Cahill; Becca Ware; Beki Doe; Ben Spencer; Bil Mowbray; Danny Turner; Harry Blue; Helen Caddick; Jason Cooper; Lucy Wilkins; Mal Campbell; Mark Bradley; Oliver Kraus; Paul Seipel; Rob Spriggs; Roxanna Shirley; Ruth Thomas
- Website: http://www.mylifestory.band

My Life Story are an English pop group formed in Camden Town, Greater London, in 1993. The group's current line-up consists of Jake Shillingford (lead vocals), Nick Evans (guitar), Jack Hosgood (bass), Chris Hardwick (drums) and Aimee Smith (keys). The group's success peaked in the mid-to-late 1990s as part of the Britpop era. Fronted by Shillingford, the group inherited their name from an earlier group from 1986, in which he had appeared in. A cross between pop and chamber orchestra, the band's sound was heavily oriented toward orchestral instruments.

The group have scored eight Top 40 singles on the UK Singles Chart and one Top 40 album on the UK Albums Chart. Their most recent album, Loving You is Killing Me, was released in February 2024.

In 2020, Shillingford and Evans were signed to Mute Song in a worldwide publishing deal which included rights to their 2019 fourth studio album, World Citizen, as well as much of the band's back catalogue from the Britpop era, formerly held by Universal Music Publishing.

== History ==
Shillingford started out in Southend-on-Sea in Essex at South Essex College, after his father had been an integral part of the 1950s pop art movement. He rebelled and quit without any art qualifications to pursue music as a career. My Life Story's prototype released an EP with 500 copies pressed and on 7'' single of three tracks in 1986, titled Home Sweet Zoo EP and "Home Sweet Zoo". It was sold at gigs and the group disbanded soon after.

In March 1987, Shillingford moved to London where he and a friend opened up The Panic Station at Dingwalls in Camden Lock. While working here, he returned to the idea of My Life Story. He would also often dress in women's clothes and perform bizarre conceptual pieces before headliners came on, with the help of Aaron Cahill who later worked with arranging the band's songs.

At the time of their 1993 second single, "Girl A, Girl B, Boy C" which was produced by Giles Martin, son of George Martin, and was given Single of the Week by both NME and Melody Maker, the group had a regular line-up of twelve members. Around this time, they were supported by Oasis. Though the membership fluctuated continually, it rarely dipped into single figures until 1999, when their third album credited just four regular members, though most of the former line-up were still used as session musicians. Their orchestral sound led them to be compared to groups such as Tindersticks and especially the Divine Comedy. Their debut album, Mornington Crescent was released on 10 January 1995. My Life Story enjoyed the most success at the time of their second album The Golden Mile, which was released on 10 March 1997. It spawned five singles that entered the lower half of the UK Top 40, but the group finally disbanded after a series of farewell concerts in December 2000.

On 26 May 2006, the band reformed with the full line-up of thirteen members, to play at the Mean Fiddler (LA2) on Charing Cross Road in London, in support of their forthcoming best of album. The gig got a review rating of 10/10 from Planet Sound. A second reunion show took place at the London Astoria on 8 December 2006. Further reunions have taken place every two years on 13 December 2007 at the O2 Shepherd's Bush Empire in West London, and Koko in Greater London on 26 November 2009, where the band performed their debut album, Mornington Crescent, for the first time in its entirety. In 2009, it was announced that, to mark 15 years since their debut album, the group would reform and perform the album in full, together with later songs. This concert took place at Koko which is next door to Mornington Crescent tube station.

My Life Story announced that they were to reunite again to perform The Golden Mile at Shepherd's Bush Empire on 3 March 2012 to celebrate fifteen years since the album's release.

In mid-2013 the group announced their first UK tour in 14 years. Shillingford stated "For many years we have only been able to play a big London show due to the sheer size and scale of the band. Now I am able to take my songs out on the road with a stripped down tight rocking outfit. I will be joined by various members of My Life Story along my journey around the UK, culminating in our traditional annual London concert with the original bunch, I'm really looking forward to seeing everyone again, expect a big, bold and brash performance, all foxy horns and horny foxes."

In September 2016, My Life Story released their first single in 16 years, "24 Hour Deflowerer". The launch was marked with a two-night residency at The Borderline in London on 14–15 October, with all audience members receiving a numbered limited edition 7" vinyl of the single.

My Life Story performed in the Star Shaped Festival, a Britpop revival tour, alongside the Bluetones, Space, Dodgy and Salad, in July to August 2017 and again in August to September 2018 together with Echobelly, Black Grape and the Supernaturals.

The fourth My Life Story studio album, World Citizen, was crowd-funded with pre-orders from fans and was released on 6 September 2019. Described as "the best My Life Story album ever", World Citizen received review scores of 4/5 in the Daily Express, 85% in Hi-Fi News and 7/10 in Uncut magazine.

The band released Loving You is Killing Me in February 2024.

== Other projects ==
The spirit of the band lived on in Shillingford's next project, ExileInside, which drew its influences from 1980s electronica, replacing the orchestral sounds of My Life Story with a retro synth based sound. Former band members Aaron Cahill and Mal Campbell appear in the line-up, and the material is engineered by George Shilling. Shilling also produced many My Life Story tracks, including most of the Golden Mile album. ExileInside was created in 2002 thanks to a fan-funded investor model.

Shillingford released an acoustic solo album in 2009 called Written Large, which featured two new tracks, plus acoustic versions of My Life Story and ExileInside songs.

In 2014 Shillingford formed the production music company Choppersaurus along with writing partner and multi-instrumentalist Nick Evans. Debut single "Motel 66" was released on 27 January 2017, from the album Herx. Tracks "Motel 66" and "Did You Come Alone?" from the album appear in the first series of The Grand Tour. The duo has also composed a trailer for Homeland Series 5 ("Dystopia") and has written toplines for "You Are Not Alone" and "Live on Dreams" by house DJ Mason. Two Choppersaurus tracks were nominated in the UK Music Production Awards 2016 – "Trouble in the Delta" for Best Rock Production Music Track and "In Limbo" for Best Trailer Production Music Track. Choppersaurus won Best Electronic Production Music Track in the 2018 UK Production Music Awards for "Blast Radius" and in the same year composed the score for US comedy horror film Blood Fest.

In 2019, Choppersaurus track "Treasure", used in a Ponds For Men TV advertisement, won Best Use of Production Music in Online, Viral & Ambient Advertising (Ponds For Men advert) in the Music & Sound Awards 2019. In 2020, "Get On Your Feet" featured in the end credits of hit Netflix original movie Dangerous Lies.

Shillingford has also presented an electronica music show on the Essex based community radio station Phoenix FM.

Dan Turner, the band's keyboard player went on to form the band MacArthur with singer Dom Chapman after the group split in 2000. He landed a recording contract with Artist Network and recorded the Northern Soul influenced album MacArthur working with musicians such as Gary "Mudbone" Cooper of Funkadelic and drummer Chris Sharrock of the La's, World Party, Robbie Williams and Oasis. As the band were about to release their first single the record company went bankrupt. The music has now been taken on by Fairwood Music.

Original drummer Jason Cooper went on to greater notice as a member of the Cure. He has also collaborated on film and television soundtracks with another former My Life Story member, cellist Oliver Kraus.

== Discography ==
Studio albums

- Mornington Crescent (Mother Tongue Records - 1995) UK No. 115
- The Golden Mile (Parlophone - 1997) UK No. 36
- Joined Up Talking (it Records - 2000) UK No. 126
- World Citizen (Exilophone Records - 2019)
- Loving You Is Killing Me (Exilophone Records - 2024)

Compilation albums

- Sex & Violins (The Best of My Life Story) (Exilophone Records 2006)
- Megaphone Theology (B-Sides and Rarities) (Exilophone Records 2006)
- Singles (A-Sides in reverse chronological order) (Exilophone Records 2020)

Singles

- "Under the Ice" (1993)
- "Girl A, Girl B, Boy C" (1993)
- "Funny Ha Ha" (1994) UK No. 107
- "You Don't Sparkle (In My Eyes)" (1995) UK No. 155
- The Mornington Crescent Companion EP (1995)
- "12 Reasons Why I Love Her" (1996) UK No. 32
- "Sparkle" (1996) UK No. 34
- "The King of Kissingdom" (1997) UK No. 35
- "Strumpet" (1997) UK No. 27
- "Duchess" (1997) UK No. 39
- "If You Can't Live Without Me Then Why Aren't You Dead Yet?" (1998) – Download-only single in Windows Media format (later available as an MP3)
- "It's a Girl Thing" (1999) UK No. 37
- "Empire Line" (1999) UK No. 58
- "Walk/Don't Walk" (2000) UK No. 48
- "24 Hour Deflowerer" (2016)
- "Taking on the World" (2019)
- "#NoFilter" (2019)
- "Versions" - (2020) – Double A-Side for Record Store Day featuring remixes of "The Rose The Sun" and "Overwinter" by Choppersaurus
- "Numb Numb Numb" (2023)
- "Tits and Attitude" (2023)
- "I'm a God" (2023)
- "Running Out of Heartbeats" (2024)

Extended Plays

- World Citizen Live (2020)

Notes

- "Sparkle" was a re-arranged and re-recorded version of "You Don't Sparkle (In My Eyes)".
- My Life Story produced promotional CDs for a planned single of "You Can't Uneat the Apple" but "Duchess" was released in its place.

Collaborations

- Yesterday Has Gone with P.J. Proby and Marc Almond (as the My Life Story Orchestra)
