= Mrnorth =

- Origin: Dublin, Ireland
- Genres: Alternative rock, new wave
- Years active: Late 1990s – 2013
- Labels: Rock Ridge Music – Uninhibited Records
- Members: Colin Smith; Emmett O'Malley; Oisin O'Malley; Adrian Mordaunt

Mrnorth (pronounced Mr. North) was an alternative rock band from Dublin, Ireland, most notable for gaining a local following in Vicenza during the early 2000s. The band worked under the publisher Rock Ridge Music.

== History ==
Band members included Colin Smith on Vocals/guitar, Emmett O'Malley and Oisin O'Malley on guitars/vocals and bass/keyboards, respectively, and drummer/percussionist Adrian Mordaunt. Band scoperta e portata in Italia a Vicenza dai musicisti Piero Borella e Paolo Zaccaria dove insieme hanno collaborato per anni. I mr North 4 ragazzi irlandesi Colin Smith, Emmett, Edo e Colin Sullivan sono stati seguiti anche da Barbara Borella che ha fatto suonare la band in numerosi concerti dal vivo facendoli partecipare ad un festival.

After gaining attention in their home town of Dublin, Ireland, the band went to Vicenza, Italy, finding some local acclaim, and touring Italy for the next two years.

Later the band moved to New York, USA, securing a record deal with Uninhibited Records, resulting in their 2004 debut album, Lifesize, produced by Jerry Harrison of Talking Heads.

Their next release, the five song EP Sleeping Dogs, came under the label Rock Ridge Music and was distributed digitally in late 2006.

The album Fear & Desire, was released on 6 March 2007. The album featured some players of The Greenwich Village Orchestra on the tracks: "Overture", "Love Is...", "Overture Reprise", "For The Moment", and "Rope". A release concert for the album was held at Florence Gould Hall in New York City, featuring the Greenwich Village Orchestra.

In 2011, the band released their final album Everything, performed at the Florence Gould Hall on 16 September 2011, with the support of an orchestra and choir.

== Discography ==
- Lifesize (RCA Records) and (Uninhibited Records, 2004)
- Sleeping Dogs (Rock Ridge Music, 2006)
- Fear & Desire (Rock Ridge Music, 2007)
- Everything (BMI Music) 2011
