= Wrong Number (The Cure song) =

Single by The Cure

from the album Galore
- Released: 17 November 1997
- Length: 6:02 (album version); 4:12 (single edit)
- Label: Fiction
- Songwriter: Robert Smith
- Producers: Robert Smith; Mark Saunders; Mark Plati

The Cure singles chronology
"Gone!" (1996)	"Wrong Number" (1997)	"Cut Here" (2001)

"Wrong Number" is a song by English rock band The Cure, released as a single on 17 November 1997 from the band's compilation album Galore (1997). It is the first song the band released to feature then future band member Reeves Gabrels, though he was not a full time member at the time of its release.

== Music video ==
A music video was released, directed by Tim Pope and featuring the band playing in a place with powder all around, Robert Smith getting married, floating faces in space and Robert being surrounded by a snake.

== Track listing ==
UK CD

1. "Wrong Number" – 6:02
2. "Wrong Number (Analogue Exchange Mix)" – 4:49
3. "Wrong Number (P2P Mix)" – 8:12
4. "Wrong Number (Crossed Line Mix)" – 8:34
5. "Wrong Number (ISDN Mix)" – 7:08

European CD

1. "Wrong Number" – 6:02
2. "Wrong Number (Analogue Exchange Mix)" – 4:49
3. "Wrong Number (Digital Exchange Mix)" – 7:08
4. "Wrong Number (Dub Analogue Exchange Mix)" – 5:34

UK 12"

Side A

1. Wrong Number
2. Wrong Number (Dub Analogue Exchange Mix)
3. Wrong Number (Engaged Mix)

Side B

1. Wrong Number (P2P Mix)
2. Wrong Number (Digital Exchange Mix)

== Versions and remixes ==
1. Wrong Number 6:02
2. Wrong Number (Radio Mix) 4:24
3. Wrong Number (Digital Exchange Mix) 7:09
4. Wrong Number (Analogue Exchange Mix) 4:50
5. Wrong Number (Dub Analogue Exchange Mix) 5:55
6. Wrong Number (ISDN Mix) 7:08
7. Wrong Number (Crossed Line Mix) 8:35
8. Wrong Number (Engaged Mix) 6:32
9. Wrong Number (P2P Mix) 8:12
10. Wrong Number (Acoustic Mix) 5:55
11. Wrong Number (16b (Crossed Line) Warm Vocal Mix) 5:30 (Only available on Greatest Hits Rarities)

== Personnel ==
- Robert Smith – vocals, guitar, bass, keyboards
- Jason Cooper – drums
- Reeves Gabrels – guitar

== Charts ==
Chart (1997)	Peak position
Australia (ARIA)	70
Netherlands (Single Top 100)	88
New Zealand (Recorded Music NZ)	43
UK Singles Chart	62
US Modern Rock Tracks (Billboard)	8
