= Steve Lyon (producer) =

British music producer

- Lyon in 2024

Background information
- Born: Twickenham
- Genres: Alternative rock; electronic rock
- Occupations: Record producer; Mix Engineer
- Works: Steve Lyon production discography
- Years active: 1984–present
- Labels: Townhouse Studios, The Manor Studio, AIR Studios ,Church Studios, Mute Records
- Website: steve-lyon.com

Steve Lyon is a British record producer, recording and mixing engineer known for his work with Depeche Mode and The Cure.

== Career ==
After earning a technical degree, Lyon began working on film set at the National Film and Television School, before transitioning to the music industry as an assistant to producer Glyn Johns for 18 months during various projects including the production of UK band "The Roaring Boys" and Scottish band Big Dish's 1984 album, Swimmer.

He later worked at Townhouse Studios and The Manor Studio before being recommended by Jon Jacobs to join AIR Studios Associated Independent Recording, founded by Sir George Martin.There, he assisted on sessions for Sir Paul McCartney's projects, including tracks later featured Flowers in the Dirt and Flaming Pie Collections and later on Mc Cartney's single Once upon a Long Ago.

=== Depeche Mode ===
Early 90's, while working as a freelance at Church Studios, Lyon was offered to work for Depeche Mode with producer Flood and Alan Wilder on the band's album Violator (1990). Lyon joined the team working on Depeche Mode’s album 'Violator (1990) alongside Flood and band member Alan Wilder.

He contributed to mixing tracks such as "Clean", "Halo", and "Policy of Truth", and co-produced B-sides and remixes. He also worked on Death's Door for the film Until the end of the World by Wim Wenders, and supported the World Violation Tour setup with Alan Wilder and recording a number of live shows for Mute Records.

Lyon later collaborated with Alan Wilder on the Nitzer Ebb's album Ebbhead (1991) and on Recoil's projects: Bloodline (1992) then Unsound Methods (1997).

He rejoined Depeche Mode on Songs of Faith and Devotion (1993), contributing to studio sessions in Madrid in a private villa, and recording studios in Hamburg and London. An extensive period followed of programming and sequencing over two months with Alan Wilder in London's Olympic Studios and at Wilder's home studio. Further work with Depeche Mode included co-production of recordings of the Devotional Tour Live and a remix of Condemnation.

=== The Cure and later work ===
Lyon's work with Depeche Mode caught the attention of Robert Smith from The Cure, who enlisted him to co-produce the 1996 album Wild Mood Swings, including the hit singles The 13th, Gone and Mint Car, recorded in the stately home of St Catherine's Court (Bath, England). Also completed in this period with The Cure was a version of the David Bowie anthem Young Americans on 104.9: an XFM compilation album, which can also be found on The Cure's compilation album Join the dots: B-side and rarities (2004)

In 1996 he worked for Siouxsie Sioux's second band the Creatures and produced six songs for the album Anima Animus which was released in 1999.

From late 90's, Lyon has also worked with artists such as Paradise Lost (Host -1999), Sohodolls (''No Regrets'', 2006), Reamonn(''Tuesday''), Laura Pausini (Primavera in Anticipio) – which won Best Female Pop Vocal Album at Latin Grammy Award in 2009) and Eros Ramazzotti (Battito Infinito} in 2022.

In the 2000s and 2010s, he developed projects in Germany, the Czech Republic and Italy, launching his own Panic Button Studios in South West London UK.

In 2024, Lyon produced the album "Hangover" for Bloom, the supergroup formed by Italian singer Giusi Ferreri.

He also participated in masterclasses Rimini in Musica, and Midem 2024, and was a jury member at Sanremo Rock in 2020. and Una voce per San Marino, selecting Italian artists for Eurovision in 2021.

He received the "Man with the Golden Ear" award at the 2024 Soundedit Festival in Poland.

== Selected works ==
As record producer or co-producer

- 1993: Songs of Faith and Devotion Live by Depeche Mode
- 1995: Cha Cha Cha by EMF
- 1995: Young Americans by The Cure
- 1995: Dredd Song by The Cure
- 1996: Wild Mood Swings by The Cure
- 1997: Love is a dog from hell by Maggie Estep
- 1997: Unsound Methods by Recoil
- 1997: Not For Sale by Nelja Ruusua
- 1999: Host by Paradise Lost
- 1999: Anima Animus by The Creatures
- 2000: Tuesday by Reamonn
- 2002: Dream No. 7 by Reamonn
- 2003: A Day Before Tomorrow by Brainstorm
- 2004: Amplifier by Amplifier
- 2005: Deixa O Mundo Girar by Pólo Norte
- 2005: Diagnostic by Daisybox
- 2006: No Regrets by Sohodolls
- 2008: 15 Anos by Pólo Norte
- 2011: Everything by MrNorth
- 2011: Midnight in the Drawn City by Suzerain
- 2012: This Isn't Just Lightning by MrNorth
- 2012: A Mirror Now (EP)- Suzerain
- 2012: L'atlante dei pensieri by it:Marco Guazzone
- 2015: ČeskosLOVEnsko by David Koller
- 2015: Space Oddity (cover) by Suzerain
- 2016: Identity by Suzerain
- 2016: Di Imperfezione ( tracks ) by Serena Abrami
- 2018: Woman (EP) by The King's Parade
- 2018: Secondo me by Mirko e il Cane
- 2021: (various tracks) by How to Live
- 2022: Fast Food at Midnight by Our Propaganda
- 2023: Sinners by The Elephant Man
- 2024: Hangover by Bloom (Giusi Ferreri)
- 2025: ( Various Tracks) by Caray Okay
- 2026: Keep Me Out by Dlemma

Albums and singles as recording and / or mixing engineer

- 1988: Say Something by Andy Leek (with producer George Martin)
- 1988: Glass by John Illsley (with producer George Martin)
- 1989: Undermilk wood by Dylan Thomas (with producer George Martin)
- 1989: Bizarro by The Wedding Present
- 1989: Kennedy by The Wedding Present
- 1990: Lily was here by Dave Stewart
- 1990: Dedicated - Tribute to Grateful Dead - China Doll with Suzanne Vega
- 1990: Violator by Depeche Mode
- 1991: Death's Door by Depeche Mode
- 1991: As Is (EP) by Nitzer Ebb
- 1991: Ebbhead by Nitzer Ebb
- 1991: Come alive by Nitzer Ebb
- 1992: Bloodline by Recoil
- 1993: Condemnation (Paris Mix) by Depeche Mode
- 1993: Songs of Faith and Devotion by Depeche Mode
- 1994: My Joy by Depeche Mode
- 1995: Psyco by Poe
- 1995: Promises Broken by Soul Asylum
- 1996: Sweet Relief II: Gravity of the Situation charity record "When I Ran Off and Left Her" with Soul Asylum
- 1997: Beautiful Night by Paul Mc Cartney
- 1997: Flaming Pie by Paul Mc Cartney
- 1998: Corto circuito by 99 Posse
- 1999: Crash by Bellatrix
- 2000: Propaganda by Briskeby
- 2000: it:La vida que vendrà by 99 Posse
- 2002: it:Amorematico by Subsonica
- 2003: Devotional by Depeche Mode
- 2006: Insider by Amplifier
- 2006: Ribbed Music For The Numb Generation by Sohodolls
- 2008: Primavera In Anticipo by Laura Pausini
- 2009: Betty's Garden by Anshelle
- 2009: Recidivo by Mario Venuti
- 2011: Anatomy by Drugstore
- 2011: it:Cattivi guagliuni by 99 Posse
- 2014: Mystoria by Amplifier
- 2020: Memories of my trip by Chris Barber, track Weeping Willow by Eric Clapton and Chris Barber
- 2022: Battito Infinito by Eros Ramazzotti
- 2024: Poeti, Vampiri & Veneri Punk by Panta
- 2024: The Rolling Stone France live Sessions@Cognac Blues Passions (with track by Rival Sons, Cedric Burnside Theo Charaf, The Inspector Cluzo and Jessie Lee & The Alchemists.
- 2025: The Gods They Made
- 2025 In June ( Various Tracks )
- 2026: EEF - New Album
- 2026: Dangerous - New Album
- 2026: Times - New album

== Awards and nominations ==
- Best Female Pop Vocal album - Latin Grammy Awards 2009 (record engineer for Laura Pausini's album Primavera in Anticipio
- Nominated Record of the Year - Latin Grammy Awards 2009 (record engineer for Laura Pausini's album En cambio no
- FIM Award 2016 'Legend of Music Production'
- Man with the Golden Ear Award 2024, for visionary and pioneering solutions in music production. - Soundedit Music Producer Festival in Poland
