= Perry Bamonte =

English musician (1960–2025)

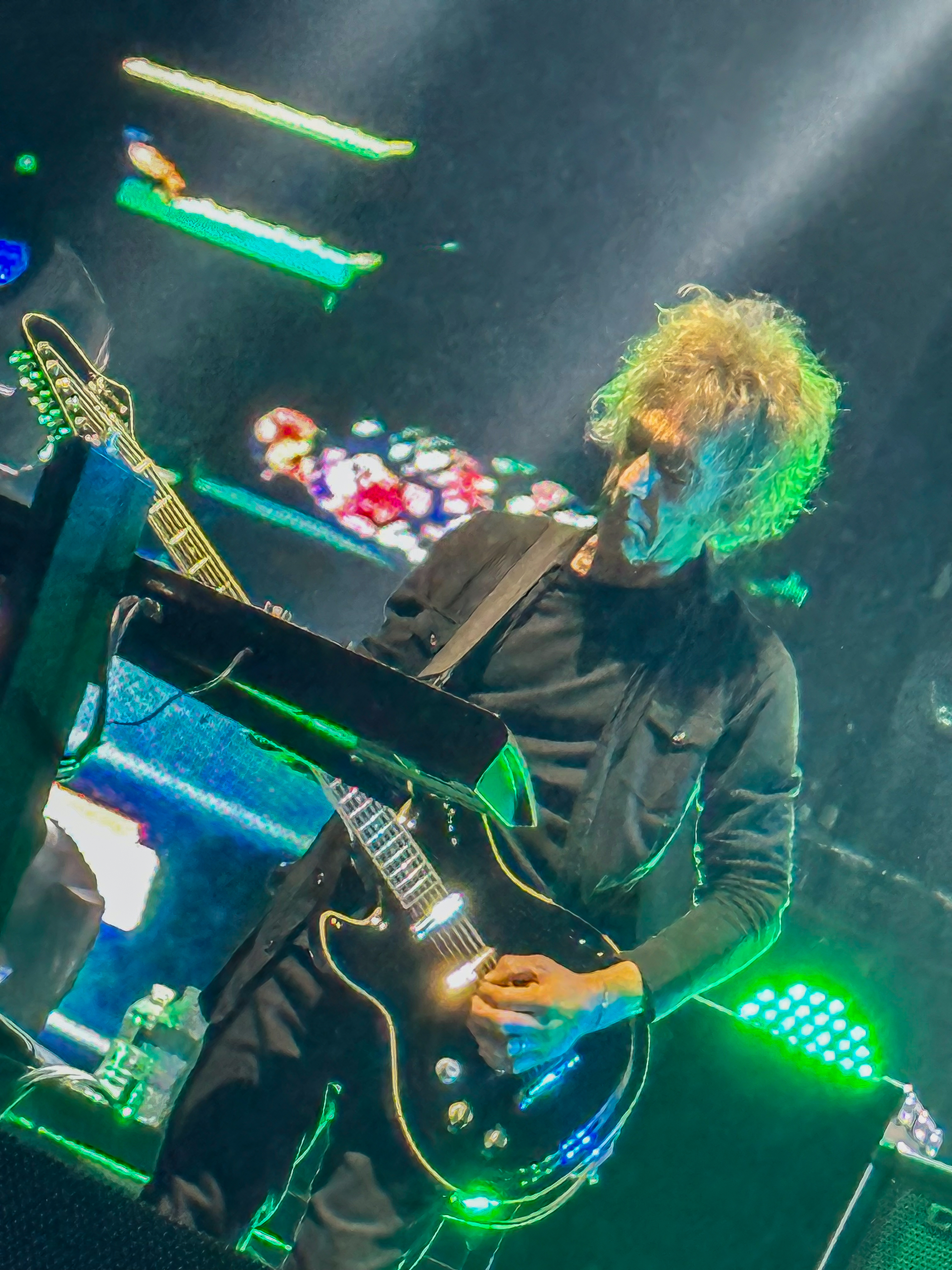
- Bamonte in 2023

Background information
- Born: Perry Archangelo Bamonte; 3 September 1960; London, England
- Died: 24 December 2025 (aged 65) England
- Genres: Post-punk; gothic rock; alternative rock; new wave
- Occupation: Musician
- Instruments: Guitar; keyboards; bass
- Formerly of: The Cure; Love Amongst Ruin

Perry Archangelo Bamonte (3 September 1960 – 24 December 2025) was an English musician and artist, best known as a guitarist and keyboardist for the Cure from 1990 to 2005, and again from 2022 to 2025. He was also the bassist for Love Amongst Ruin.

== Life and career ==
Bamonte was born in London, England, on 3 September 1960. He was known as Teddy. He spent his early childhood in Basildon and grew up on the coast of Essex.

His younger brother Daryl worked as a tour manager for the Cure and Depeche Mode, and via this connection Perry joined the Cure's road crew in 1984. He eventually became the guitar technician and personal assistant for group leader Robert Smith. Already a guitarist, during this period Bamonte was taught to play piano and keyboards by Smith's sister Janet. When keyboardist Roger O'Donnell left the Cure in 1990, Bamonte was promoted to a full member of the band, playing both keyboards and guitar regularly, as well as six-string bass and percussion occasionally.

His first album with the Cure was Wish in 1992, and he remained with the band for their next three albums. Due to the departure of guitarist Porl Thompson and the return of Roger O'Donnell during this period, Bamonte's duties for the band shifted to a stronger focus on guitar and less on keyboards. In 2005, Bamonte and O'Donnell were dismissed by Smith, who reportedly wanted to reinvent the band as a three-piece. Despite the abrupt dismissal and the lack of an official statement describing the reason, Bamonte and Smith remained on amicable terms.

Bamonte kept a low profile for several years, devoting his time to fly fishing and a career as an illustrator. He regularly contributed content and illustrations for the magazine Fly Culture. He lived in Devon with his wife Donna, who rehabilitated and retrained racehorses. They also ran a retirement home for elderly horses.

In 2012 he joined the supergroup Love Amongst Ruin as bassist and appeared on their 2015 album Lose Your Way. In 2019, Bamonte was inducted into the Rock and Roll Hall of Fame as a member of the Cure. In a move that had not been previously announced, Bamonte rejoined the Cure in 2022 for their extensive Shows of a Lost World tour. He performed in around 400 shows during his stint with the Cure.

Bamonte died after a short illness at home in the southwest of England, on 24 December 2025, at the age of 65. He is survived by his wife Donna.

== Discography ==
Bamonte's albums with the Cure include:

- Wish (1992)
- Paris (live, 1993)
- Show (live, 1993)
- Wild Mood Swings (1996)
- Galore (compilation, 1997)
- Bloodflowers (2000)
- The Cure (2004)
- Songs of a Live World: Troxy London MMXXIV (live, 2024)
