= Jason Cooper =

British drummer

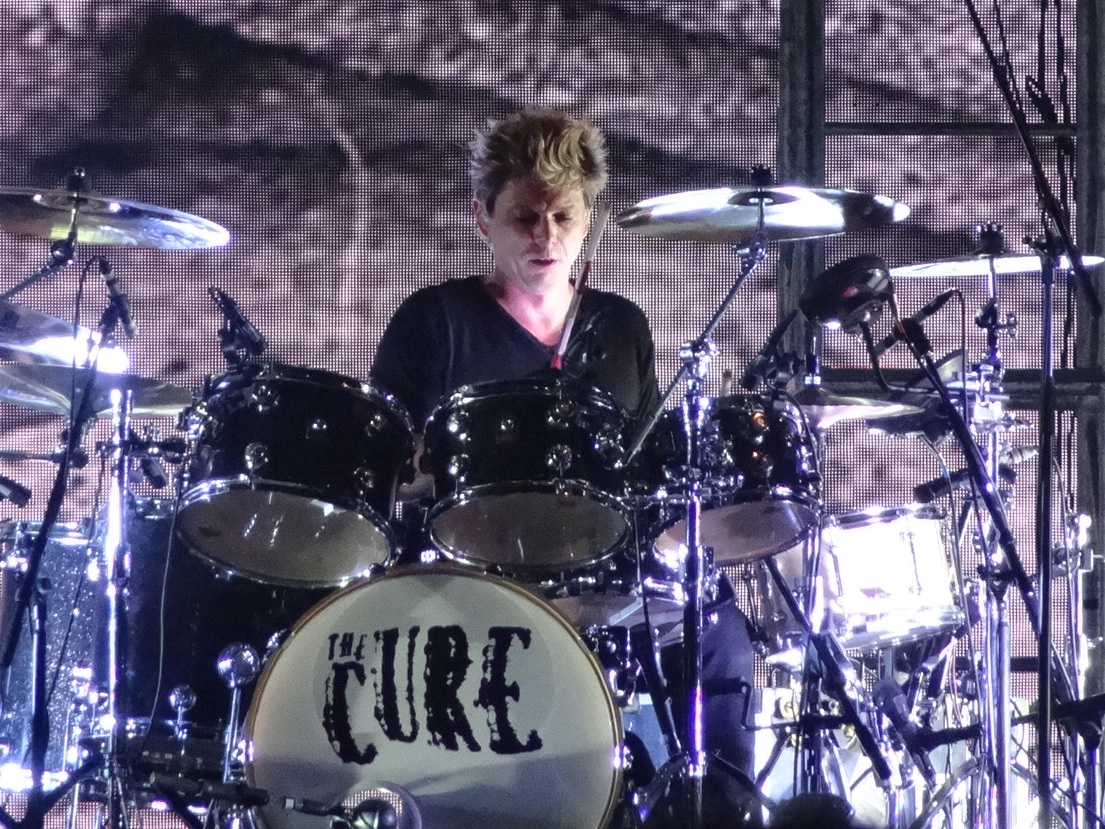
- Cooper performing with the Cure in 2013

Background information
- Born: Jason Toop Cooper; 31 January 1967 (age 59); London, England
- Genres: Post-punk; gothic rock; alternative rock
- Occupation: Drummer
- Member of: The Cure
- Formerly of: My Life Story
- Website: thecure.com

Jason Toop Cooper (born 31 January 1967) is an English drummer, best known as a member of the Cure since 1995.

== Biography ==
Cooper was born in London and grew up in Bath. His father, an employee of Virgin Records, gave him a copy of the early Cure album Seventeen Seconds; Cooper became a fan of the band and first saw them live in 1990. He studied drums at London's Drumtech institute, where he later became a patron and visiting artist.

Cooper's first professional drumming work was as an early member of My Life Story, and he also performed as a session drummer for acts including Jean-Jacques Burnel and Billy Ray Martin. In 1995, he responded to an ad that said simply "Drummer wanted for international band". The Cure placed the ad following the departure of previous drummer Boris Williams. Cooper's first live performance with the band was in Greece in June 1995. Cooper was one of four drummers to play on the band's 1996 album Wild Mood Swings, but he was invited to join the band officially and has been their drummer ever since.

Cooper also participated in the COGASM project with bandmate Robert Smith in 1998. He has made guest appearances with David Bowie, Bat for Lashes, Marina and the Diamonds, and Steven Wilson. Cooper also composes music for film, most notably the score for the horror movie From Within, for which he and co-composer Oliver Kraus won the award for best original score at the 2008 Solstice Film Festival. In 2019, he was inducted into the Rock and Roll Hall of Fame as a member of the Cure. In 2023, Cooper and Smith collaborated with Noel Gallagher for a one-off single. Cooper is also known as a bicyclist for charity fund-raising events.

== Discography with the Cure ==
- Wild Mood Swings (1996)
- Galore (1997)
- Bloodflowers (2000)
- Greatest Hits (2001)
- Trilogy (2003), DVD
- The Cure (2004)
- Festival 2005 (2005), DVD
- 4:13 Dream (2008)
- Bestival Live 2011 (2011)
- 40 Live Curaetion 25 + Anniversary (2018) DVD/BluRay
- Songs of a Lost World (2024)
