= Brian Routh =

British performance and sound artist (1948–2018)

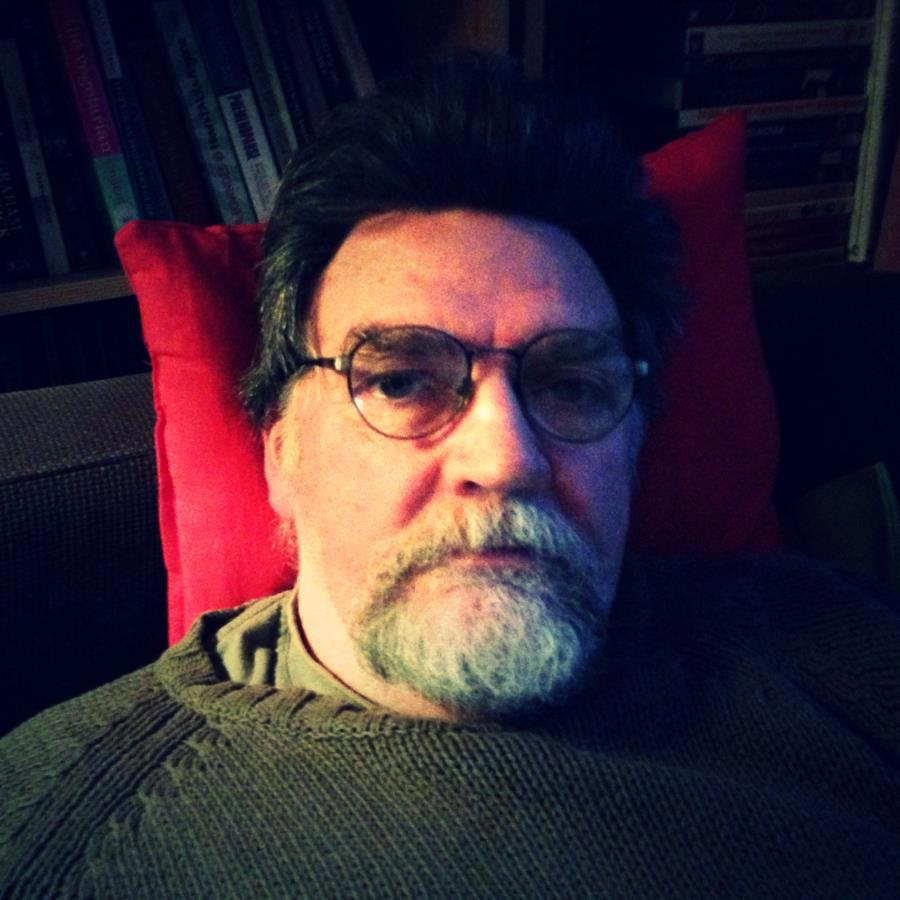
- Born: March 9, 1948; Gateshead, England
- Died: August 3, 2018 (aged 70)
- Occupations: Performance artist, sound artist
- Years active: 1972–2018
- Spouse(s): Nina Sobell (m. 1975; div. 1981) Karen Finley (m. 1981; div. 1987) Patricia Wells (m. 2012)

Brian Routh (9 March 1948 – 3 August 2018) was an English performance and sound artist.

He was known for his performance work with Martin von Haselberg as one of The Kipper Kids who became notorious for their rowdy and rebellious performances in the art world; influencing the punk movement and the inspiration for such acts as the Blue Man Group, Karen Finley and Paul McCarthy. In addition to performing in the United Kingdom, The Kipper Kids performed throughout Europe, North Africa, Canada and the United States. They also worked on a number of projects for HBO and Cinemax as well as cameos in various movies.

In addition to The Kipper Kids, Routh performed as a solo act and collaborated with other performers and artists. He produced sound art which consists of video performance and sound works that have been featured in museums, galleries, and on radio and television.

== Life and family ==
Born in Gateshead, County Durham, Routh grew up in a working-class family with parents that were considered rebellious talkers and storytellers. Routh's great-grandfather James Diston was a bare-knuckle prize fighter who also ran a circus.

Routh attended the Bifron's Secondary Modern School in Barking, Essex, graduating in 1963. In Routh's youth, he participated in boxing, poetry and singing. He learned to play the piano, harmonium, organ, and later the drums. Routh played in a rock group as a drummer in the early 1960s and later performed as a singer and guitarist.

He attended the East 15 Acting School in Loughton, Essex, where he met von Haselberg, a fellow student. They became good friends, and together they created The Kipper Kids. They performed in small theatres, clubs and festivals in Austria, Germany, Italy, and the Netherlands. They received an invitation to perform as The Kipper Kids at the 1972 Summer Olympics in Munich, Germany, which was marred by the Munich massacre.

Routh was married to new media artist Nina Sobell from 1975 to 1981. Routh had taught in the United States at the San Francisco Art Institute in San Francisco, California, where he met Karen Finley. They were married in 1981, which ended in divorce in 1987. Since 2009, Routh was partnered with digital artist Patricia Wells and they were married in 2012.

Routh lived in Leicester.

== Performance artist ==
Routh started his career in 1971 as a performance artist. After inventing the character of Harry Kipper with von Haselberg on an acid trip in Frankfurt, Germany, they developed The Kipper Kids.

Routh embarked on solo work primarily in the mid-1970s. Von Haselberg and Routh reunited in 1977 to appear as the Kipper Kids in a film by Richard Elfman called Forbidden Zone, which was released in 1982.

In 1980, Routh began to perform as a solo artist again in between Kipper Kids appearances. He performed at Lincoln Center in New York City, as well as theatre festivals in Germany and Italy, and at Art Cologne, an art fair in Cologne, Germany.

In 1982, The Kipper Kids were cast in a unique variety show promoted by HBO, entitled The Mondo Beyondo Show, featuring and hosted by actress and singer Bette Midler. Routh was also involved in writing and starring in three projects for Cinemax and HBO, and he performed in several films alongside von Haselberg as The Kipper Kids.

== Collaborations ==
Routh collaborated with and appeared with:

- The Kipper Kids
- Blue Man Group
- Nina Sobell
- Karen Finley (1981 tour of Italy and Germany)
- Henry Rollins (in Arizona, 1987)
- Public Image Ltd
- Genesis P-Orridge
- Sex Pistols (at Reading University, 1975)
- Johanna Went (at the Theatre Carnival)
- Sequel Cafe LA USA
- Eric Bogosian
- Anne Bean
- Bow Gamelan Ensemble
- Lol Coxhill
- Evan Parker
- Derek Bailey
- Ian Hinchliffe

== Filmography and television work ==
Year	Movie-Television Show
1991	The Addams Family
1991	Spirit of '76
1990	Mum's Magic Mulch
1989	Moonlighting
1988	UHF
1988	Mondo Beyondo
1988	K.O. Kippers
1981	Theatre in Trance – Rainer Werner Fassbinde
1981	No Holds Barre
1980	Forbidden Zone
1979	Dress Rehearsal-Werner Schroeter
1977 & 1978	Chuck Barris Rah-Rah Show

== 2000–2018 ==
Routh worked primarily within the sound art genre on a variety of pieces combining video, performance and sound in the form of diaries, rants and sound works. He was also involved in activism and uses notable speakers, sampling their speeches and re-editing them to music he designed for the piece. His sound work has been featured on numerous BBC Radio shows and The Guardian weekly podcast.

== See also ==
- List of British artists
- List of English people
- List of performance artists
- List of sound artists
