= Alone (The Cure song) =

2024 single by the Cure

Single by the Cure

from the album Songs of a Lost World
- Released: 26 September 2024
- Genre: Gothic rock
- Length: 6:48
- Label: Polydor
- Songwriter: Robert Smith
- Producers: Robert Smith; Paul Corkett

The Cure singles chronology
"Disintegration (live)" (2019)	"Alone" (2024)	"A Fragile Thing" (2024)

Lyric video
- "Alone" on YouTube

"Alone" is a song by the English rock band the Cure from their fourteenth studio album, Songs of a Lost World (2024). Robert Smith wrote the song in 2019 after he rediscovered the Ernest Dowson poem "Dregs" in his journal and adopted its imagery. It is a gothic rock song that features drums, guitar, synthesisers, and piano. "Alone" was produced by Smith and Paul Corkett. It begins with several minutes of instrumentals before Smith sings. Music critics opined that the song's lyrical themes include mortality and environmentalism.

"Alone" first appeared during live performances as part of the band's 2022–2023 Shows of a Lost World tour. It was released as the lead single for Songs of a Lost World on 26 September 2024, being the band's first new song since their previous studio album, 4:13 Dream (2008). "Alone" received critical acclaim, with particular praise for its atmosphere, its placement as the album's opening track, and Smith's vocal performance. The song peaked at number six on the UK Singles Sales Chart, and entered component charts in Australia, New Zealand, and the United States. Many publications included "Alone" in their lists of the best songs of 2024. It won Best Alternative Music Performance at the 68th Annual Grammy Awards in 2026.

== Background and production ==
After the release of 4:13 Dream in 2008, the Cure prioritised touring in the 2010s instead of recording and releasing new music. The band initially announced in early 2014 that their next studio album, a follow-up to 4:13 Dream titled 4:14 Scream, would be released later that year. However, the album was never released. Similarly, the band considered creating a new album to commemorate their 40th anniversary in 2018, but it never materialised. In 2019, the Cure once again began recording new music, under the working title Live from the Moon. During those sessions, the band created enough material for three albums; eight tracks were later finished in 2024 to become Songs of a Lost World.

Robert Smith and Paul Corkett co-produced, mixed, and engineered "Alone". The song was mastered by Matt Colton, and credits Bunny Lake, Jack Boston, and Joe Jones as assistant recording engineers. Smith performed vocals, guitar, keyboards, and bass on "Alone" and is credited as its sole songwriter. Smith mentioned wanting the track to be about loneliness but found his initial attempts at writing it to be unpoetic. In his search for the "right opening line for the right opening song", he rediscovered "Dregs", a poem by Ernest Dowson, inside a journal where he collected rhymes and phrases he thought were interesting. He was inspired by its imagery, and specifically noted that the lyric "every song we sing, we sing alone" was influenced by the poem. In addition to Smith's contributions, "Alone" features bass from Simon Gallup; drums and percussion from Jason Cooper; keyboards from Roger O'Donnell; and guitar from Reeves Gabrels, in his first studio release with the band.

== Composition ==
"Alone"
A 30-second sample of "Alone". A gothic rock song which has been compared to nu-shoegaze, it instrumentally features drums, guitar, and synthesisers, and contains a dense Wall of Sound.

"Alone" has a length of six minutes and forty-eight seconds. According to sheet music published at Musicnotes.com by Universal Music Publishing Group, "Alone" is set in the key of A minor and runs at a moderately fast tempo of 100 beats per minute in common time. The track begins with three minutes and twenty-one seconds of dark instrumentals before Smith begins to sing. The song features prominent drums, distorted guitar, orchestral synthesisers, and a triplet pattern played on piano and guitar. The Daily Telegraph's Neil McCormick described "Alone" as "the most Goth song ever made", noting its Wall of Sound approach; Mark Beaumont of The Independent likened the track to nu-shoegaze due to its "warping" sound.

Andrew Trendell of NME wrote that "Alone" was more similar to the band's "cinematic and expansive" output than their pop-leaning songs. Smith stated that Songs of a Lost World's soundscapes harkened back to the band's work on their eighth studio album, Disintegration (1989). Music critics widely agreed with this comparison for "Alone"; (Note: Attributed to Stereogum's Tom Breihan, American Songwriter's Thom Donovan, BrooklynVegan's Bill Pearis, The Irish Times's Ed Power, PopMatters's Alison Ross, Double J's Hannah Story, The Skinny's Lewis Wade, and Clash's Sam Walker-Smart.) Alexis Petridis of The Guardian and Michael Bonner of Uncut specifically found it similar to Disintegration's opening track, "Plainsong". Critics added that the song resembled tracks on their previous records Pornography (1982) and Bloodflowers (2000). Additionally, both McCormick and Variety's A.D. Amorosi compared "Alone" to works by David Bowie; the former described the song as a Berlin Trilogy track being "waterboarded with buckets of oil", whereas the latter likened the song's instrumental introduction to "Blackstar" (2015).

Lyrically, "Alone" borrows from Dowson's "Dregs", and adds references to plummeting birds and dashed dreams. Petridis wrote that themes of mortality permeated "Alone". He linked this to the deaths of Smith's parents and older brother during the recording process of Songs of a Lost World. Sam Walker-Smart of Clash similarly suggested that those deaths, alongside Smith's curation of the 2018 Meltdown festival, allowed him to "tap into that deep well of emotion and creativity from which The Cure has built their legacy". Alex Burrows of Classic Rock saw themes of environmentalism in "Alone", writing that the song laments the inability of humans to prevent Earth's destruction. Beats per Minute's Todd Dedman concurred that the track focuses on both death and the environment, and further suggested themes of friendships and time.

== Release and commercial performance ==
On 6 October 2022, the Cure debuted "Alone" live in Riga during the first performance of Shows of a Lost World, the band's concert tour in support of Songs of a Lost World. It was the first song played during every show of that tour. The band posted an 18-second preview of the track to their social media on 23 September 2024. Three days later, the full track was premiered at noon on BBC Radio 6 Music during Mary Anne Hobbs's show and was released as a single; it was the band's first new song since 2008. On 12 April 2025, a remix of "Alone" by Four Tet was released as an exclusive twelve-inch single for Record Store Day. This remix, alongside ones created by Shanti Celeste and Ex-Easter Island Head, was later released on 13 June 2025 as part of the remix album Mixes of a Lost World.

"Alone" reached number 6 on the UK Singles Sales Chart and number 26 on the UK Singles Downloads Chart. The song charted in the United States on the Alternative Digital Song Sales and Rock Digital Song Sales charts at numbers 10 and 15, respectively. It also reached number 22 on the New Zealand Hot Singles chart, and number 31 on the Australia Digital Tracks chart.

== Critical reception ==
Professional ratings
Review scores
Source	Rating
Clash	9/10
The Guardian	4/5 stars
The Irish Times	4/5 stars
PopMatters	9/10
The Daily Telegraph	4/5 stars
The Times	4/5 stars

On initial release, "Alone" received critical acclaim for its melancholic atmosphere and for Smith's vocal performance. Alison Ross of PopMatters called the track "raw and visceral yet infused with celestial gravity", and McCormick similarly described it as sorrowful yet "deeply gripping". The Irish Times's Ed Power compared "Alone" to a "huge aching sigh" in that it elicited comfort through its darkness. Both Will Hodgkinson of The Times and Walker-Smart remarked that Smith's vocal performance remained unusually youthful despite his age; the former said that the track reflected the band's allure of being "locked within eternal youth", and the latter called it among the band's best works since the early 1990s. Petridis concurred that Smith's voice had not changed much, but commented that Smith nonetheless "sounds very different indeed" from the earlier, nihilistic attitude towards death he portrayed in the band's earlier works. Consequence, Stereogum, Under the Radar, and Uproxx all included "Alone" in their lists of that week's best songs.

"Alone" continued to receive acclaim after the release of Songs of a Lost World. Rolling Stone's Rob Sheffield called "Alone" the band's "tour de force", and The Skinny's Lewis Wade listed it as a standout on the record, alongside "And Nothing Is Forever". Ben Cardew of Pitchfork, Lewie Parkinson-Jones of Slant Magazine, and Dom Gourlay of Under the Radar all described the track as "epic" in their reviews of the album, giving particular praise for its dramatic instrumentation. In contrast, Dedman lauded the song for its intimacy in spite of its grandiose themes. Some critics praised its placement as the album's first track; Paste's Elise Soutar stated that the track "serve[d] the same purpose" as the lead single and as the album's opener, through how it "crack[ed] open a desolate sonic sky". Additionally, critics likened the sounds and lyrical themes of "Alone" to "Endsong", the final track on Songs of a Lost World. In his ranking of Songs of a Lost World, Al Shipley of Billboard placed "Alone" fifth (out of eight tracks); he praised its release as the lead single for proving that the album as a whole would appeal to fans over chasing radio success.

Music critics have included "Alone" in their rankings of the band's best songs. Petridis placed it at number 13 on his list of the band's 20 greatest songs, praising it as a "triumph" for its intensity and sentimentality. Clash's writers included "Alone" in their unranked list of the band's 15 best songs, with Robin Murray commending the Cure for being "in full control of their artistry". The staff of Mojo ranked it at number 29 in their list of the band's 30 greatest songs, declaring it a strong comeback for the band.

=== Accolades ===
Many publications included "Alone" in their lists of the best songs of 2024. It also won Best Alternative Music Performance during the 68th Annual Grammy Awards in 2026.

Publication	Accolade	Rank	Ref.
Consequence	200 Best Songs of 2024	12	
DIY	Tracks of the Year 2024	15 (Note: Out of 20 tracks)	
The Guardian	The 20 Best Songs of 2024	11	
The Independent	The 20 Best Songs of 2024	6	
NME	The 50 Best Songs of 2024	19	
Paste	The 100 Best Songs of 2024	47	
Pitchfork	The 100 Best Songs of 2024	15	
Stereogum	The 50 Best Songs of 2024	11	

== Personnel ==
Credits are adapted from Apple Music.

=== The Cure ===
- Robert Smith – guitar, vocals, keyboards, bass, songwriter, producer, mixing engineer, assistant recording engineer
- Simon Gallup – bass
- Jason Cooper – drums, percussion
- Roger O'Donnell – keyboards
- Reeves Gabrels – guitar

=== Additional personnel ===
- Paul Corkett – producer, mixing engineer, recording engineer
- Matt Colton – mastering engineer
- Bunny Lake – assistant recording engineer
- Jack Boston – assistant recording engineer
- Joe Jones – assistant recording engineer

== Charts ==
2024–2025 weekly chart performance
Chart	Peak position
Australia Digital Tracks (ARIA)	31
New Zealand Hot Singles (RMNZ)	22
UK Singles Downloads (OCC)	26
UK Singles Sales (OCC)	6
US Rock Digital Song Sales (Billboard)	15
US Alternative Digital Song Sales (Billboard)	10
