= Meltdown (festival) =

Annual London music festival

Coordinates: 51°30′24.99″N 0°6′50.07″W

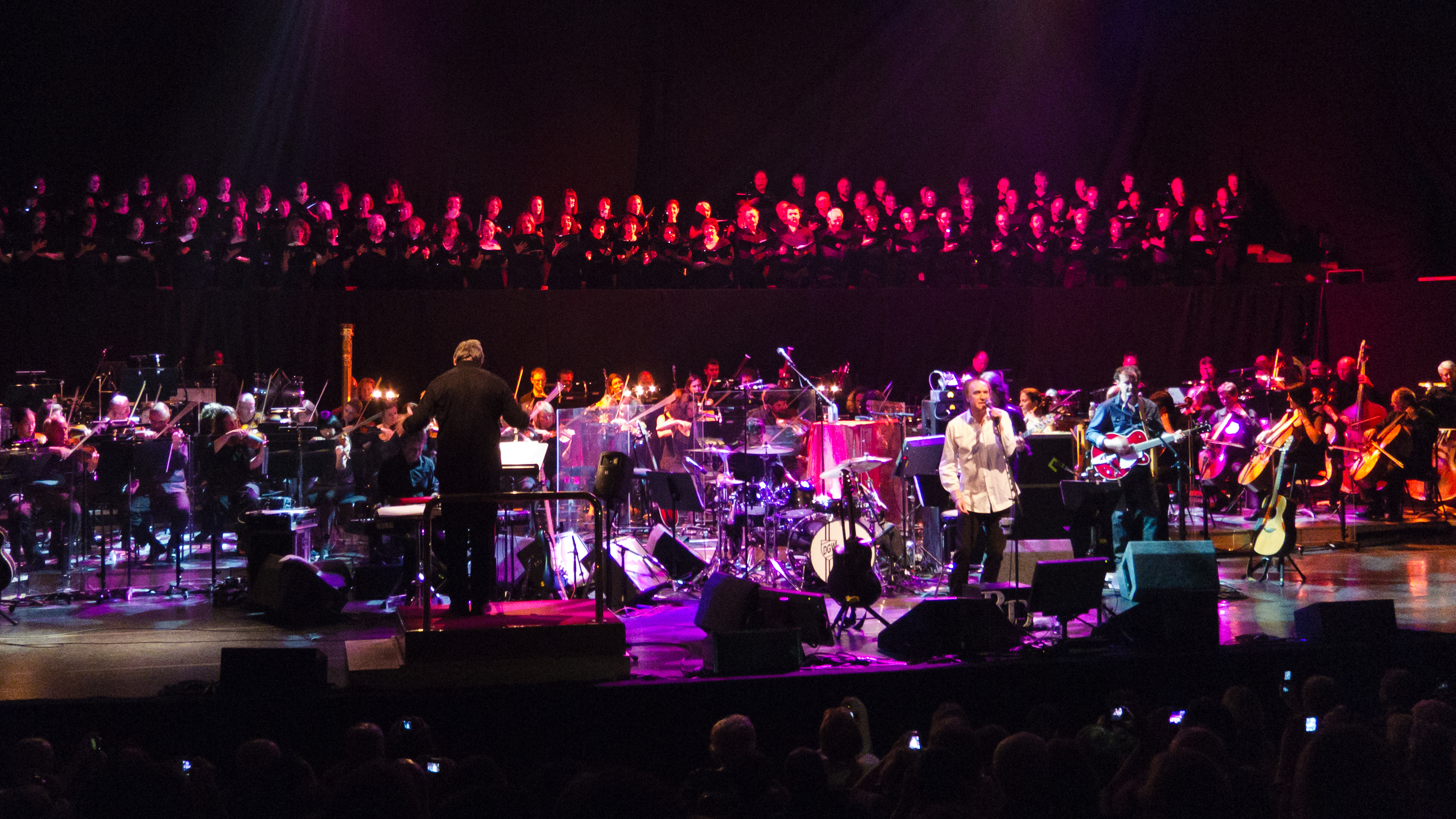
Ray Davies closing the 2011 Meltdown Festival at Royal Festival Hall

Meltdown is an annual festival held in London, featuring a mix of music, art, performance and film. Meltdown is held in June at Southbank Centre, the arts complex covering 21 acres (85,000 m^{2}) and including the Royal Festival Hall, the Queen Elizabeth Hall and The Hayward. Each year, the festival chooses an established music artist to act as director of the event, and they pick the performers of their choosing. Directors of the festival have included Louis Andriessen, Elvis Costello, David Byrne, David Bowie, Patti Smith, Lee Scratch Perry, Morrissey, Jarvis Cocker, Nick Cave, Scott Walker, John Peel and Ornette Coleman, Grace Jones, and Chaka Khan. The festival has been held annually since 1993, except in 2006 when the Royal Festival Hall was closed for refurbishment, and when the 2020 Meltdown was postponed to 2022 due to the COVID-19 pandemic.

== Previous line-ups ==
Year	Curator	Artists
1993	George Benjamin	The London Philharmonic Orchestra with conductors George Benjamin & Franz Welser-Möst, Ensemble Modern with conductor Markus Stenz, percussionists James Wood, Robert van Sice and Emmanuel Séjourné and soprano Sara Stowe, Nikolai and Valery Mongoush, London Sinfonietta, Hatton Hodgson, Paul Burwell
1994	Louis Andriessen	Housewatch, Icebreaker, City Degung Gamelon Ensemble, Piano Circus, The Steve Martland Band, Mecklenburgh Opera Ensemble, Bang on a Can All Stars, Gavin Bryars Ensemble, Philip Glass, Alain Platel and les ballets C de la B, Asko Ensemble
1995	Elvis Costello	Jeff Buckley, Keith Tippett, The Jazz Passengers, Marc Ribot, Brodsky Quartet, BJ Cole's Transparent Music Trio, Bill Frisell Trio, Steve Nieve, The London Sinfonietta, The Wooden Indians, The Angell Piano Trio, The London Philharmonic Orchestra, Anúna and the Sabri Brothers, Moondog, June Tabor, Huw Warren, Mark Emerson, Patricia Rozario, Fretwork, The Composers Ensemble, Michael McGlynn, Elvis Costello
1996	Magnus Lindberg	Ibimil and Yat-Kha, Trevor Wishart, Electric Phoenix, Sonic Arts Network, Bruce Gilbert, Heiner Goebbels, David Moss, Ernst Stotzner, Varttina and Leningrad Cowboys, London Sinfonietta, Fritz Lang's Metropolis, Avanti
1997	Laurie Anderson	DJ Scanner, Ivor Cutler, Lou Reed, Spalding Gray, Gidon Kremer and his Tango Group, Ken Nordine, Arto Lindsay, Alan Reid, Heather Woodbury, Salman Rushdie, Bill T. Jones, Robert Wilson, Richard Foreman's Ontogical Hysteric Theatre, Ryuichi Sakamoto
1998	John Peel	Cornershop, C.C.C.C., Gorky's Zygotic Mynci, Masonna, Sonic Youth, Spiritualized, The Delgados, XOL DOG 400, The Jesus and Mary Chain, Culture, Blood and Fire Sound System, Damon Albarn, Jessica Voorsanger, The Leopards, The Beau Hunks, Ardal O'Hanlon, Jeremy Hardy, Suicide, Merzbow, Autechre, Aube, Extreme Noise Terror, Pita, Zbigniew Karkowski
1999	Nick Cave	Barry Humphries, Bonnie Prince Billy, Gary Lucas, Nina Simone, Syd Straw, Dirty Three, Van Dyke Parks, Polly Borland, Tony Clark, Lee Hazlewood
2000	Scott Walker	Mark-Anthony Turnage, Asian Dub Foundation, Blur, Cicala Mvta, Clinic, Evan Parker, Jarvis Cocker, Jim O'Rourke, Luc Bondy, Radiohead, Elliott Smith, Tom McRae, Clearlake, Richard Alston Dance Company, Smog
2001	Robert Wyatt	Baaba Maal, David Gilmour, Elvis Costello & Brett Anderson, Meira Asher, Ivor Cutler, Julie Tippetts, Massacre, Matthew Shipp & William Parker, Max Roach, Oi Va Voi, Sparklehorse, The Raincoats, Gorky's Zygotic Mynci, Tricky, Wayne Horvitz, Mark Eitzel, Anja Garbarek, Cristina Dona, Eviatar Banai
2002	David Bowie	Asian Dub Foundation, Baby Zizanie, Badly Drawn Boy, Bobby Conn, Coldplay, Daniel Johnston, David Kitt, Fischerspooner, Gonzales, Harry Hill, Kimmo Pohjonen, Luke Haines, Mercury Rev, Peaches, Pete Yorn, Philip Glass, Senor Coconut Y Su Conjunto, Six by Seven, Stew, Suede, Supergrass, Television, The Dandy Warhols, The Divine Comedy, The International Noise Conspiracy, The Legendary Stardust Cowboy, The Lonesome Organist, The Polyphonic Spree, The The, The Waterboys, Yeah Yeah Yeahs
2003	Lee "Scratch" Perry	Fun Lovin' Criminals, Michael Franti and Spearhead, Stateside Hombres, The Sun Ra Arkestra, Asian Dub Foundation, Tortoise, The Bees, Mad Professor
2004	Morrissey	Alan Bennett, Ari Up, Cockney Rejects, Damien Dempsey, Ennio Marchetto, Gene, James Maker with Noko 440, Jane Birkin, Linder Sterling, London Sinfonietta plays Henryk Górecki and Arvo Pärt, Loudon Wainwright III, Lypsinka, Nancy Sinatra, New York Dolls, The Ordinary Boys, Sparks, The Libertines
2005	Patti Smith	Antony and the Johnsons, Balanescu Quartet, Bert Jansch, Beth Orton, Billy Bragg, Black Rebel Motorcycle Club, Brian Jonestown Massacre, Carbon/Silicon, Cat Power, Ed Harcourt, Eels, Flea, Fred Frith, Hank Williams III, Janet Hamill, Jeff Beck, Joanna Newsom, John Cale, John Frusciante, Johnny Marr and Robyn Hitchcock, Kevin Shields, Kristin Hersh, Lemn Sissay, Lenny Kaye, Loso, Martha Wainwright, Marc Almond, Rachid Taha, Richard Hell, Roy Harper, Sinéad O'Connor, Steve Earle, Television, Tinariwen, Tori Amos, Yat-Kha, Yoko Ono
2006	N/A	Royal Festival Hall closed for refurbishment
2007	Jarvis Cocker	Cornershop, Iggy & The Stooges, The Jesus and Mary Chain, Motörhead, Devo, Melanie Safka, Roky Erickson, Sunn O))), Littl'ans, Scout Niblett, Selfish Cunt, KPM Allstars, John Barry, The Valerie Project, 1990s, Mathew Sawyer and The Ghosts, Clinic
2008	Massive Attack	Massive Attack, Gong, Yellow Magic Orchestra, Reggae Acoustic Songbook, Princess Malachi, Elbow, Fleet Foxes, The Heritage Orchestra: Music from Blade Runner, Stiff Little Fingers, Mark Stewart, The Maffia, Adrian Sherwood, The Shortwave Set, Martina Topley, Grace Jones, Dälek, The Cool Kids, Shape Of Broad Minds, Flying Lotus, PVT, Gang Of Four, Tom Tom Club, Terry Callier, Aloe Blacc, Tunng, Leila, Saxon Sound System with Musclehead, Tippa Irie, Trevor Sax and Papa Levi, Silent Disco with guests DJs including Four Tet and Peaches
2009	Ornette Coleman	The Roots, David Murray with the Gwo-Ka Masters and Jamaaladeen Tacuma, Yoko Ono and the Plastic Ono Band with Sean Lennon and Cornelius, Baaba Maal, Yo La Tengo, Moby, Bobby McFerrin, Patti Smith and The Silver Mt. Zion Memorial Orchestra & Tra-La-La Band, Master Musicians of Jajouka, Charlie Haden and the Liberation Music Orchestra with Carla Bley, Robert Wyatt and The Bad Plus
2010	Richard Thompson	Elvis Costello, The Duckworth Lewis Method, Joe Henry, Paolo Nutini, Van Dyke Parks, Tom Robinson, Seasick Steve, Loudon Wainwright III, Al-Thawra, The Kominas
2011	Ray Davies	A Tribute to Tony Wilson, Current 93, Alan Price Set, Ben Waters: Boogie 4 Stu, Geno Washington and the Ram Jam Band, John Cooper Clarke, John Otway and Wild Willy Barrett, London Sinfonietta, Lydia Lunch, Madness, Michael Eavis: A Glastonbury Life, Nick Lowe and special guests, Anna Calvi, Peter Asher: A Musical Memoir of the Sixties and Beyond, Ray Davies, Roger McGough and special guests, Ron Sexsmith, Terry Jones and Michael Palin In Conversation, The Crazy World of Arthur Brown and The Legendary Pink Dots, The Fugs, The Sonics and Wire, Yo La Tengo
2012	Anohni	Buffy Sainte-Marie, CocoRosie, Elizabeth Fraser, Kim Cattrall, Matmos, Anohni, Light Asylum, Laurie Anderson, Hercules & Love Affair, Diamanda Galas, Marc Almond, Joey Arias, Boy George, Lou Reed, Hal Willner, Cyclobe, William Basinski, The Voluptuous Horror of Karen Black.
2013	Yoko Ono	Plastic Ono Band, Cibo Matto, Yoko Ono, Sean Lennon, Immortal Technique, Siouxsie Sioux, Julianna Barwick, patten, Peaches performing the vocal score of Jesus Christ Superstar, Ryuichi Sakamoto & Alva Noto, Iggy Pop and The Stooges, Amadéus Leopold, Savages, Body/Head, Thurston Moore, Ikue Mori, Mystical Weapons, Deerhoof, Verity Susman, Patti Smith, Hans-Ulrich Obrist, Chris McCabe, Iain Sinclair, Mark Burnhope, Sarah Crewe, Niall McDevitt, Sascha Aurora Akhtar, Eric Weinstein, Vanessa Vine, Aleks Krotoski, Marcus du Sautoy, Earl Slick, Boy George, Camille O'Sullivan, Pete Molinari, Andrew Wyatt, Patrick Wolf, Lene Lovich, Bishnu Priya, Reggie Watts, Mac Lethal.
2014	James Lavelle	Polar Bear, Grandmaster Flash, Scratch Perverts, Unkle, Ableton interactive project, Chrissie Hynde, Zacharias Blad, Mark Lanegan, Tor Miller, Petite Noir, Roman Remains, DJ Shadow, James Lavelle, Gilles Peterson, Max Richter, Joshua Homme, Mélanie De Biasio, Auclair, Keaton Henson, Edwyn Collins, Colorama, Radkey, Amazing Snakeheads, Trentemoller, Howie B, James Holden, Not Waving, Glass Animals, Rosie Lowe, Neneh Cherry, screening and live soundtrack of Under the Skin, DJ Harvey, Dooks, Machines, These Ghosts, Benji B, Tom Vek & Olga Bell, Nick Zinner, ESG, 23 Skidoo, Trevor Jackson, Goldie & Heritage Orchestra, Don Letts, Voicelab, JP Duncan, Acid Brass, Horsemeat Disco, Jeff Mills, A Guy Called Gerald, Craig Richard, re-envisioning of A Love Supreme.
2015	David Byrne	Bianca Casady & The C.I.A., Estrella Morente, Benjamin Clementine, Sinkane, Sunn O))), Psapp, screening of There Will Be Blood with live performance of Jonny Greenwood's score, Gaby Moreno, Atomic Bomb!, Hypnotic Brass Ensemble, María Rodés, Eliza McCarthy, New York Brass Band, Carmen Consoli, Petra Haden, Anna Calvi, John Luther Adams, Matthew Herbert, Lonnie Holley & Alexis Taylor, François & The Atlas Mountains, Young Jean Lee, Young Marble Giants, Gob Squad, London Sacred Harp Singers, Monsalve y Los Forajidos, screening of Planet of the Apes with live orchestral performance
2016	Guy Garvey	Femi Kuti, Kog & The Zongo Brigade, This Is The Kit, I Am Kloot performing Sky At Night, The Staves, Connan Mockasin, STEVE, Laura Marling, Marika Hackman, Richard Hawley, Mano McLaughlin, Howe Gelb
2017	M.I.A.	Young Fathers, Just Vibez Carnival, Soulwax, Afrikan Boy, Rinse FM Block party, MHD, Giggs, Yung Lean + Princess Nokia, hip hop karaoke, I Wayne + Dexta Daps, Crystal Castles, Awful Records Club Night, Young M.A. + Tommy Genesis, JD Samson + Mykki Blanco, MIA
2018	Robert Smith	The Cure, Death Cab for Cutie, Deftones, The Libertines, Manic Street Preachers, Mogwai, My Bloody Valentine, Nine Inch Nails, Placebo, The Psychedelic Furs 65daysofstatic, Alcest, God Is an Astronaut, Kristin Hersh, Low, Maybeshewill, Mono, The Notwist, Suzanne Vega, The Penelopes A Dead Forest Index, The Anchoress, And Also the Trees, Black Moth Super Rainbow, Blue Crime, The Church, De Rosa, Douglas Dare, Drahla, Eat Static (DJ Set), Emma Ruth Rundle, False Advertising, Fear of Men, Hilary Woods, I Like Trains, Indian Queens, Is Bliss, Jambinai, James Walsh, Jo Quail, Jónsi, Alex Somers & Paul Corley: 'Liminal', The Joy Formidable, JoyCut, Kælan Mikla, Kagoule, Kathryn Joseph, Kiasmos DJ Set, Kidsmoke, Kite Base, The KVB, Loop, Mammoth Weed Wizard Bastard, Martinez, Matt Holubowski, Misas Fall, Moon Duo, Planning for Burial, PG. Lost, Pumarosa, Skinny Girl Diet, The Soft Moon, Thought Forms, Tropic of Cancer, The Twilight Sad, Vessels Live & DJ set, Vex Red, Yonaka
2019	Nile Rodgers	Nile Rodgers, Chic, Johnny Marr, Jungle, Dave Stewart performing Eurythmics songbook, KOKOROKO, anaïs, Thundercat, Anitta, Azekel, Kero Kero Bonito, SOPHIE, Onyx Collective, Nakhane, Songhoy Blues
2022	Grace Jones	Grace Jones, Peaches, Skunk Anansie, Baaba Maal, Angélique Kidjo, Sky Ferreira, Shingai, John Grant, Greentea Peng, Dry Cleaning, Eska, Alewya, Josey Rebelle, cktrl, a live dub of Island Life by Seng Seng Rhythm Section, ShezAr and the Soul Sirens performing gospel covers of Jones' songs, Hot Congotronics (Hot Chip x Kasai Allstars), Lee Fields, Skinny Pelembe, Big Joanie, Dave Okumu, The Love Unlimited Synth Orchestra, Adrian Sherwood performing Time Boom x The Upsetters Dub Sessions, Hercules and Love Affair, Kevin Richard Martin and Hatis Noit, Oumou Sangaré, Meshell Ndegeocello, Ben Hayes and Hector Plimmer, Honey Dijon, Cut Hands, Desire Marea, Two Another
2023	Christine and the Queens	Christine and the Queens, Django Django, KOKOROKO, Oxlade, Sigur Rós & London Contemporary Orchestra, Warpaint, Yemi Alade, Bat for Lashes, Taos Bertrand: brutal syntax, BitterSuite presents Bodies Tilted, Petit Noir, Katya Zamolodchikova, Ndxia, Riff Cohen, Johnny Jewel, Let's Eat Grandma, Lynks, serpentwithfeet, SQÜRL, Totally Enormous Extinct Dinosaurs, Soap&Skin, Sweatmother.
2024	Chaka Khan	Todrick Hall, Speakers Corner Quartet, Incognito, Morcheeba, Rahsaan Patterson, Balimaya Project, Tawiah, Master Peace, Emeli Sandé, Anaiis, Bruce Hornsby, Big Joanie, War, Sisters in Dub, Lady Blackbird, Reuben James, Judi Jackson, Sipho, Nu Civilisation Orchestra, House Gospel Choir, Mica Paris.
2025	Little Simz	The Streets, Mahalia, The Joy, Tiwa Savage, Sasha Keable, BADBADNOTGOOD, Lola Young, Ghetts, Yukimi, Alewya, Nubya Garcia, Miraa May, MEGA, James Blake, Jon Batiste.
2026	Harry Styles	Harry Styles, Mulatu Astatke, Yussef Dayes, Erika De Casier, Beverly Glenn-Copeland & Elizabeth Copeland, Devonté Hynes Ensemble, Warpaint, Kamasi Washington, James Murphy, Ninajirachi, Bar Italia, Fousheé, Jon Hopkins with Maddie Ashman & Leo Abrahams, Shabaka & Friends, Orlando Weeks, Nilüfer Yanya, Stephen Fretwell, Getdown Services
