= Nina Sobell =

American artist and engineer (born 1947)

Nina Sobell (born 1947, Patchogue, New York) is a contemporary sculptor, digital artist, videographer, and performance artist. She began creating web-based net artworks in the early 1990s.

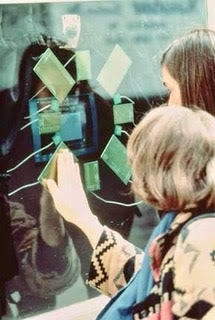
Nina Sobell, Touching Pads in Front Window October 21, 2002

== Early life and education ==
In 1969, Sobell earned a B.F.A. at Tyler School of Art, Temple University in Philadelphia, Pennsylvania, and an in 1971 she earned an M.F.A. at Cornell University in Ithaca, New York. While at Cornell, Sobell started using video to observe the interactions viewers would have with sculptures she placed anonymously in public spaces. Sobell was interested in the relation between art and the viewer, and believed that the audience actually became part of the work through interacting with it, creating new outputs of art with each different interaction. She taught at UCLA in the Design Media in the Arts, Film, TV and Digital Media Department in 1982 and 1983, the School of Visual Arts, New York, and served as a visiting lecturer at Goldsmiths College, University of London, in 2005 and 2006. Sobell has lectured and participated on panel discussions at many academic institutions, including Ars Electronica.

== Career ==
As a digital artist focusing on experimental forms of interaction and performance, Sobell uses tools such as wireless EEG headbands, MIDI sound, webcasts, and closed-circuit video surveillance. She was part of the feminist video performance movement of the 1970s with works such as Chicken on Foot (1974) and Hey! Baby, Chicky!! (1978), but she is best known for her work with Emily Hartzell on ParkBench and ArTisTheater (1993). Her many other collaborators have included Billy Kluver, Anne Bean, Norman White, Sonya Allin, David Bacon, Per Biorn, John Dubberstein, Karen Finley, RJ Fleck, Jesse Gilbert, Marek Kulbacki, Julie Martin, Anders Mansson, Aaron Michaelson, Stacy Pershall, Anatole Shaw, Jeremy Slater, and Yuqing Sun. Her work appears in the collections of the Blanton Museum of Art; Banff Centre for the Arts; Cornell University; the Getty Museum; Manchester Art Gallery; the Contemporary Arts Museum Houston; the ZKM Center for Art and Media Karlsruhe; the Institute of Contemporary Arts in London; and the Dia Art Foundation.

In the early 1970s, Sobell worked with closed-circuit video to explore the interactive relationship between artist and audience.

Sobell was married to performance and sound artist Brian Routh (aka "Harry Kipper of the Kipper Kids") between 1975 and 1981, and the couple collaborated on many performance video pieces, including Interactive Electroencephalographic Video Drawings. In 1973, with the series Brainwave Drawing, Sobell set up a system in which two participants could see their brainwaves changing in real time as they simultaneously watched their images on closed-circuit video, creating an improvisational feedback loop as they silently attempted to communicate with each other.

In 1993, Sobell and Emily Hartzell collaborated on the ParkBench Kiosk as artists-in-residence at New York University Center for Advanced Technology. The piece was a network of kiosks that used the internet to bring different communities and neighborhoods together, through methods such as videoconferencing and a collaborative drawing space. The locations of the kiosks were in art museums, restaurants, parks, shops, bars, subway stations, and clubs. The piece won Art & Science Collaborations' Digital99 Award and was a 1999 Webby Award Nominee and Yahoo's Pick of the Week for January 1999.

With the introduction that same year of NCSA Mosaic, the first graphical browser, Sobell and Hartzell created a "ParkBench" interface for the web and named this version of the project ArTisTheater. They turned their studio into a real-time public web installation by linking it to the web with a 24-hour webcam feed. Their goal was to explore the nature of video, performance, and surveillance on the internet, and they invited artists to use their setup on a weekly basis to create live webcast performances of various kinds. Sobell and Hartzell's first performance for ArTisTheater has been called "the first live interactive performance in the history of the World Wide Web" using a telerobotic camera operated remotely by participants. Some 80 performances are now archived in the ArTisTheater Performance Archive, and the roster of those who participated includes Martha Wilson, Margot Lovejoy, Diane Ludin, Prema Murthy, and Adrianne Wortzel.

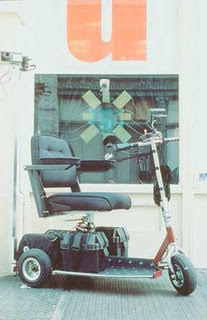
Nina Sobell, Alice in Front

Alice Sat Here (1995) was a very early drone mobile data collection and surveillance project, made in collaboration with engineers and system analysts from the Center for Advanced Technology at New York University, which enabled Web visitors or passersby to personally view the interior of the CODE show curated by Roz Dimon at the Ricco Maresca Gallery. Its key component was a telerobotic camera mounted on a wireless rolling chair. Sobell took the camera to the streets in one of the earliest tethered drones in the interactive installation Alice Sat Here. Web participants or passersby ran the camera via touch pads that appeared in the display window of the CODE show at the Ricco Maresca Gallery (1995) and later, at the ACM CHI conference as VirtuAlice (1997). The touch pads surrounded a closed circuit monitor with a camera at the top and fed back passerby’s images, dissolving them over the interior of the gallery so they could virtually feel a part of the show. The video images captured were made available to web viewers in real time. Web participants could also point the camera at a rear-view mirror on the handlebars, which identified the face of anyone riding the chair, to web viewers. Sobell and Hartzell described the piece as "a passage between physical and cyber space. We converge from web-side and street-side, explore parallel spaces separated by glass, and peer through the membrane at each other's representations.” The name Alice is "reminiscent of Lewis Carroll's Wonderland, in which visitors from different dimensions can meet and interact with one another."

VirtuaAlice 1997 was a sturdier redesign of the early Drone Alice Sat Here 1995 and interacted with at CHI 97, the Computer-Human Interaction Conference in Atlanta, equipped with GUI line formation software for the Web participants.

Barterama (1995) was an early piece exploring the internet's many-to-many connectivity for its potential to enable a barter economy. It was essentially a proof-of-concept project, with a small website listing a dozen categories in which Sobell and Hartzell were willing to make trades, with details of specific offers and a form for facilitating actual trading.

Sobell's work is widely recognized. She was honored with a Franklin Furnace Fellowship in 2007 and is an Acker Award recipient for video (2021). She has received grants from the NEA, NYFA, and NYSCA, and was nominated for a Rockefeller Foundation Fellowship in 2003.

== Partial list of exhibitions and presentations ==
- Unseen Unheard Solo Installation at The Window Museum, Portugal - 2020
- Unseen Unheard Video 6'08 at Three Colt Street Gallery, London - 2020
- Nina Sobell, Hindsight is 2020, Solo Exhibition at White Page Gallery, Valencia, Spain - 2020 (currently online www.noemata.net/wpg/nina)
- Interactive Brain Wave Drawings Presentation LASER Leonardo Art and Science Forum, New York - 2018
- Subliminal video, Estirando El Tiempo, curator, Elizabeth Ross, Museo de la Ciudad, Querétaro, Mexico - 2018
- History of Interactive Brain Wave Drawings Panel presentation for the Brain On Art Conference, Valencia, Spain - 2017
- Subliminal video in collaboration with Laura Ortman - music, commissioned by Leo Kuelbs collection. - 2016
- WMAT, White Mountain Apache Tribe video in collaboration with Laura Ortman - music, commissioned by Leo Kuelbs collection - 2015
- A Feast for the Eyes, curated by Heike Epildauer, Bank Austria Kunstforum, Vienna - 2010
- L.E.S. Scene Then and Now curated by Shalom Neuman, Fusion Art Museum, NY - 2008
- Making Love With a Chair (collaborative video for Reap) Anne Bean’s Show at Matt's Gallery, London - 2008
- Apocalypse Show, sculptures, curated by Johnny Velardi, Garage Gallery, Brooklyn - 2008
- Waves-The Art of the Electromagnetic Society, Hartware Kunstverein, Dortmund, Germany - 2008
- California Video Show, videos Hey! Baby Chicky!!! and participatory Brain Wave Drawing Installation and documentation, curated by Glenn Phillips, Getty Museum, Los Angeles part of the Paul McCarthy Film Series.
- Internal Message Search Solo Exhibition at Gallery Area 53, Vienna, Austria - 2008
- Not About: Is Solo Exhibition Location One Gallery, NY - 2008
- Alice Sat Here, telerobotic installation w/Hartzell in CODE, curated by Roz Dimon, Ricco/Maresca Gallery, NYC - 2005
- Synaesthesia, Thinking of You, curated by Chloe Vaitsu interactive participatory installation of Brain Wave Drawings on the internet, Institute of Contemporary Arts, London UK - 2004
- Brain Wave Drawings New York State Council on the Arts, Artist Fellowship - 2001
- ParkBench Webby Award nominated internet interface with Emily Hartzell - 1999
- Streaming: A Laboratory, with E. Hartzell/ Sonya Allin, curated by John Tucker, W. Phillips Gallery, Banff - 1999
- Sunshine & Noir: Art in Los Angeles 1960-1997, curated by Paul McCarthy, at The Armand Hammer, Castello di Rivoli, Italy, Kunstmuseum Wolfsburg, and the Louisiana MOMA, Denmark - 1999
- Interactive Installations, 1974 - 1998, DAAD Studios, Berlin with Emily Hartzell - 1998
- Ebb and Flow, Web performance, Morton Studio, turbulence.org (J.Gilbert/S.Allin) - 1998
- Art on the Web (ParkBench), Whitney Museum of American Art - 1996
- Language and Disorder: videotapes, New Langton Arts, San Francisco - 1996
- LA Sampler 1970-1993, Hey, Baby Chicky!!! Paul McCarthy curator, David Zwirner Gallery, NYC
