= Sardinia Street, Kingsway =

Street in London

Coordinates: 51°30′54.09″N 0°7′5.01″W

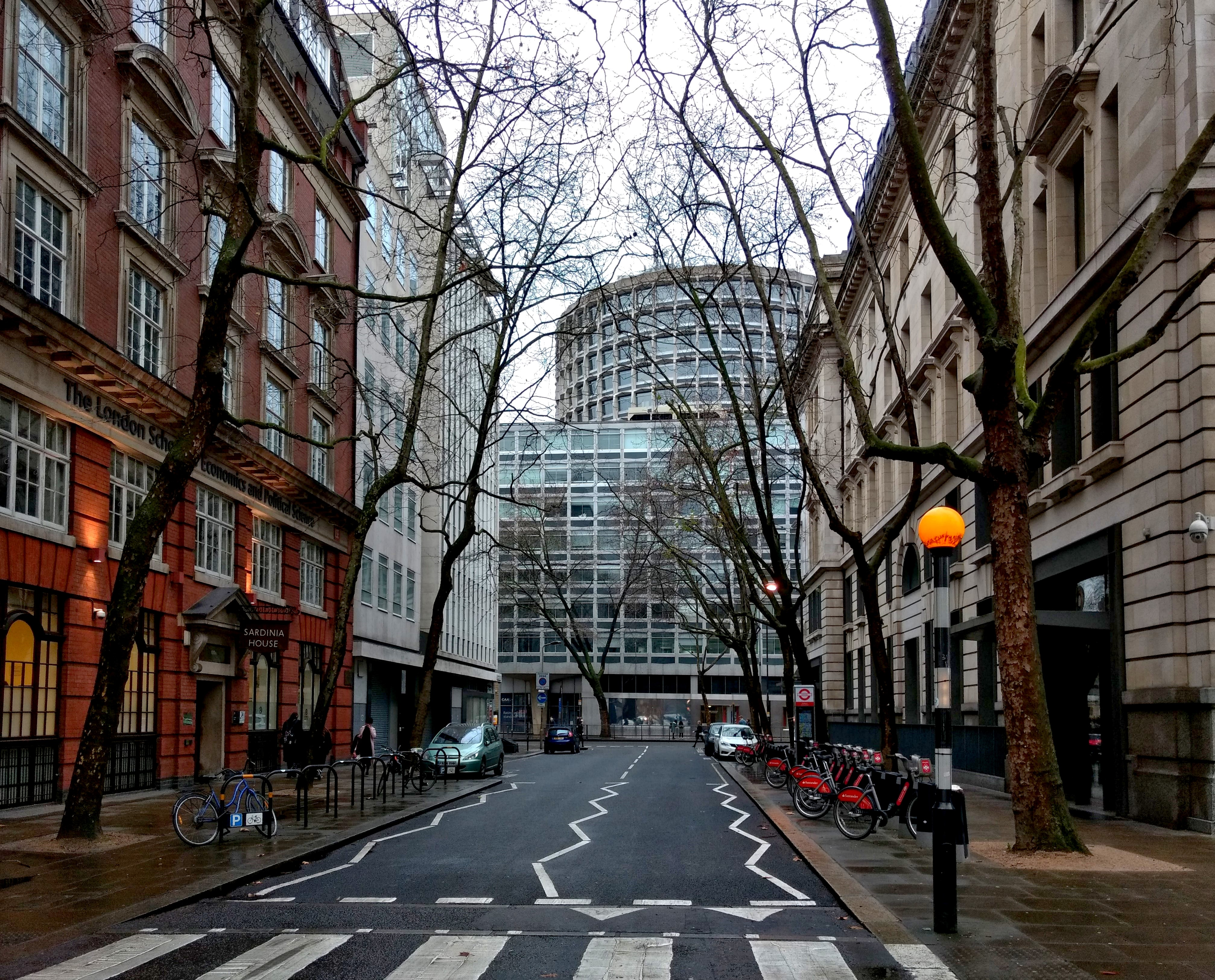
Sardinia Street looking west with Kingsway and One Kemble Street in the distance.

Sardinia Street is a short street in the City of Westminster (south side) and the London Borough of Camden (north side) that runs from Kingsway to the south-west corner of Lincoln's Inn Fields. It was named after the old Sardinia Street that was demolished during the construction of Kingsway in 1905.

== Buildings ==
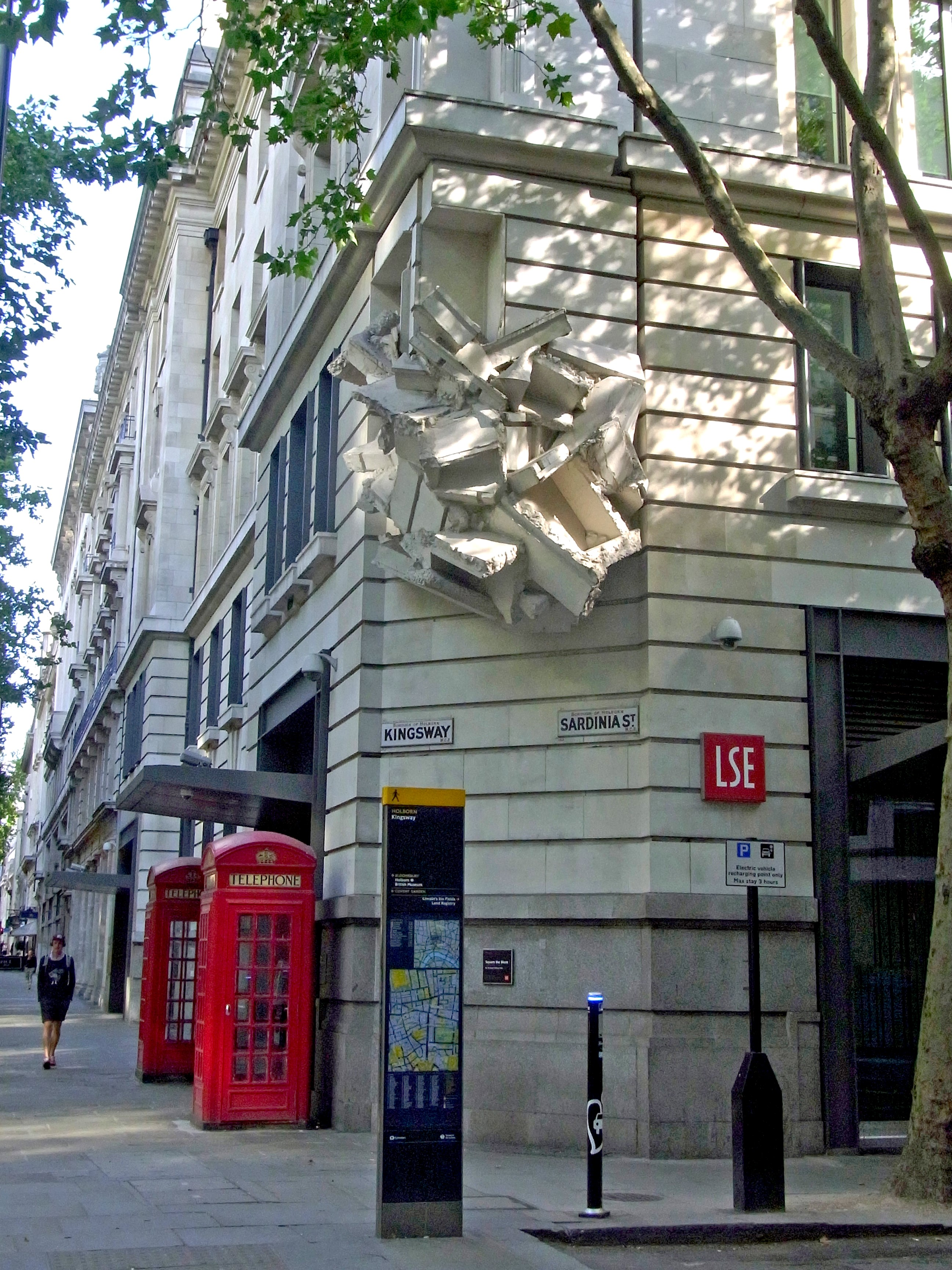
London School of Economics buildings on the corner of Kingsway and Sardinia Street featuring a sculpture by Richard Wilson.

The north side of Sardinia street is wholly taken up by the New Academic Building of the London School of Economics (LSE), formerly the Public Trustee Office. In 2009, a sculpture by Richard Wilson was installed on its corner with Kingsway. The K2 telephone kiosk on that corner is grade II listed with Historic England.

The south side includes an office building, Sardinia House (c.1910) of the LSE, and a King's College London building that fronts Kingsway.
