= Mixes of a Lost World =

Remix album by the Cure
- Released: 13 June 2025
- Length: 122:30
- Label: Fiction; Polydor

The Cure chronology
Songs of a Lost World (2024)	Mixes of a Lost World (2025)

Singles from Mixes of a Lost World
- 1. "Alone (Four Tet Remix)" Released: 21 April 2025; 2. "I Can Never Say Goodbye (Paul Oakenfold 'Cinematic' Remix)" Released: 21 April 2025; 3. "Warsong (Chino Moreno Remix)" Released: 2 May 2025; 4. "Endsong (Orbital Remix)" Released: 16 May 2025; 5. "A Fragile Thing (Mark Saunders Heartbroken Remix)" Released: 21 June 2025

Mixes of a Lost World is the third remix album by English rock band the Cure, released on 13 June 2025 by Fiction, and Polydor. The album features 24 remixes of songs from the band's 2024 album Songs of a Lost World.

== Background ==
The origins of Mixes of a Lost World come from a collection of unsolicited remixes of Songs of a Lost World tracks sent to Robert Smith who fancied them and was curious of how the whole album would sound entirely reinterpreted by others. In December, Smith confirmed the "companion release" was to be released, adding that there was yet a "third one which is completely different. It's really kind of random stuff, it's like late-night studio stuff."

On 21 April 2025, the band announced a remix album, featuring reworks by artists including Four Tet, Paul Oakenfold, and Orbital. It is the third collection of remixes of the Cure songs, after Mixed Up (1990), and Torn Down (2018).

The band announced that all of its recording royalties of Mixes of a Lost World will benefit the charity War Child UK, that supports children living with the effects of war and conflict, similarly to the case of the live album Songs of a Live World Troxy London MMXXlV, recorded at The Cure's album launch show at the Troxy in East London.

When inviting the Danish electronic musician Trentemøller to the project, Smith wrote him a direct email, asking "if [he]’d be up for remixing a track from the Cure album." He could choose whichever song. Around the time of announcement of the project, the English electronic musician and DJ Four Tet has been closing his recent shows with his own remix of "Alone".

== Release ==
The two-disc edition feature all eight tracks from the album in remixed form. A three-disc deluxe set includes additional eight remixes and reworks of each tracks from the original album, by artists including Chino Moreno of Deftones, Mogwai, and 65daysofstatic. Therefore, the three-disc version of Mixes of a Lost World features three versions of each original song in a remixed form.

All editions of the remix album feature alternative artwork by the band's longtime collaborator Andy Vella.

On 21 June 2025, an additional remix of "A Fragile Thing" by record producer Mark Saunders, was digitally released post-album, namely "A Fragile Thing (Mark Saunders Heartbroken Remix)".

== Track listing ==
Mixes of a Lost World track listing
No.	Title	Length
1.	"I Can Never Say Goodbye" (Paul Oakenfold 'Cinematic' Remix)	4:15
2.	"Endsong" (Orbital Remix)	6:23
3.	"Drone:Nodrone" (Daniel Avery Remix)	5:20
4.	"All I Ever Am" (meera Remix)	8:02
5.	"A Fragile Thing" (Âme Remix)	5:33
6.	"And Nothing Is Forever" (Danny Briottet & Rico Conning Remix)	5:28
7.	"Warsong" (Daybreakers Remix)	6:17
8.	"Alone" (Four Tet Remix)	6:16
9.	"I Can Never Say Goodbye" (Mental Overdrive Remix)	7:10
10.	"And Nothing Is Forever" (Cosmodelica Electric Eden Remix)	8:41
11.	"A Fragile Thing" (Sally C Remix)	4:43
12.	"Endsong" (Gregor Tresher Remix)	6:05
13.	"Warsong" (Omid 16B Remix)	6:04
14.	"Drone:Nodrone" (Anja Schneider Remix)	5:00
15.	"Alone" (Shanti Celeste 'February Blues' Remix)	5:54
16.	"All I Ever Am" (Mura Masa Remix)	6:39
17.	"I Can Never Say Goodbye" (Craven Faults Rework)	9:03
18.	"Drone:Nodrone" (JoyCut 'Anti-Gravitational' Remix)	6:22
19.	"And Nothing Is Forever" (Trentemøller Rework)	4:58
20.	"Warsong" (Chino Moreno Remix)	4:17
21.	"Alone" (Ex-Easter Island Head Remix)	4:41
22.	"All I Ever Am" (65daysofstatic Remix)	5:16
23.	"A Fragile Thing" (The Twilight Sad Remix)	4:27
24.	"Endsong" (Mogwai Remix)	10:46
Total length:		147:40

== Charts ==
Chart performance for Mixes of a Lost World
Chart (2025)	Peak position
Austrian Albums (Ö3 Austria)	9
Belgian Albums (Ultratop Flanders)	5
Belgian Albums (Ultratop Wallonia)	3
Croatian International Albums (HDU)	21
Dutch Albums (Album Top 100)	21
French Albums (SNEP)	29
French Rock & Metal Albums (SNEP)	2
German Albums (Offizielle Top 100)	5
Greek Albums (IFPI)	45
Hungarian Physical Albums (MAHASZ)	21
Irish Albums (IRMA)	86
Polish Albums (ZPAV)	10
Scottish Albums (Official Charts)	3
Spanish Albums (PROMUSICAE)	34
Swiss Albums (Schweizer Hitparade)	4
UK Albums (Official Charts)	9
UK Dance Albums (Official Charts)	1
