= PAVES crossing zones =

Collaborative art project

PAVES crossing zones was a collaborative project between the artists Anne Bean, who initiated it, Sinead O'Donnell, Poshya Kakl, Efi Ben-David and Vlasta Delimar, which aimed to reflect on how "intense, wider political context inevitably sculpts work". The project aimed to use dialogue & debate to develop trust and understanding between communities, whilst enriching the cultural landscape of Europe and its surrounding nations.

The process began with the artists spending a week in residency in Toynbee studios in March 2009, making and sharing work together. Following this, they simultaneously made a durational work in their own countries (England, Ireland, Croatia, Israel, Kurdistan-Iraq), keeping an awareness of shared consciousness. In Anne's words "Frontiers, borders, demarcations, boundaries, barriers, bureaucracy, officialdom, laws, regulations and rules all became irrelevant to the fact that we were making a collaborative piece".

The artists then spent a week in each other's countries, developing work together for the duration of a year; this process driven approach is typical of both Anne Bean and the other artists involved whom stem from visual and performance art backgrounds. Unfortunately due to visa restrictions Poshya Kakl was unable to travel and contributed from Erbil, Kurdistan-Iraq (where she is based), thus the artists are yet to meet and work with all members physically present.

Poshya's inability to travel had a profound effect on the project's development and artists' relationships, resulting in the 'Crossing Zones' interface. This interface used digital technologies such as video phone projections during live performances.

In August 2010, Anne Bean and Sinead O'Donnell were interviewed by Helen Kaplinsky for Resonance FM about the process and politics that informed the project.
