= Shows of a Lost World =

2022–23 concert tour by the Cure

- Tour by the Cure
- North American leg poster
- Location: Europe; North America; South America
- Associated album: Songs of a Lost World
- Start date: 6 October 2022
- End date: 10 December 2023
- Legs: 3
- No. of shows: 88
- Supporting acts: The Twilight Sad; Just Mustard

Shows of a Lost World was a concert tour by British rock band the Cure.

The tour began in October 2022, with frontman Robert Smith promising that the band's new album Songs of a Lost World would come out before the tour's commencement. While the band played unreleased songs from the album, it was ultimately not released in 2022.

The North American leg of the tour attracted much media attention for Smith's public criticism of Ticketmaster, specifically its dynamic pricing mechanism and additional charged fees. It sold over 547,000 tickets and grossed $37.5 million over 35 shows, making it the highest-grossing tour of the band's career to date. The South American leg of the tour commenced in September 2023 and consists of three standalone concerts and four festival appearances.

The album was finally released on 1 November 2024, nearly a year after the conclusion of the tour.

== Background ==
On 6 December 2021, the Cure announced a 44-date European tour in 2022, also mentioning the release of an unannounced 67-minute new album. The Twilight Sad were named as openers for all dates. In May 2022, Robert Smith said that the band's new album Songs of a Lost World was almost finished and would be released before the tour began.

The tour began on 6 October 2022 at the Arena Riga in Riga, Latvia with the album still unreleased, although the Cure debuted two songs from it live, "Alone" and "Endsong". On 10 October in Stockholm, the Cure debuted another new song, "And Nothing is Forever", and on 20 October, the band premiered a fourth new song, "I Can Never Say Goodbye", in Kraków. On 4 November in Milan, the Cure debuted a fifth new song, "A Fragile Thing".

In March 2023, the Cure announced a 30-date leg of the Shows of a Lost World tour across the United States and Canada. All shows also featured the Twilight Sad as a supporting act. On 5 April, Smith announced that second dates had been added in San Diego, Montreal, and Atlanta and a new show had been added in Portland, bringing the scheduled number of concerts to 34. On 27 April, a second show in San Francisco was announced, bringing the tour to 35 dates. On 23 May in Los Angeles, the Cure performed another new song, "Another Happy Birthday", which dated back to 1997. However, this song did not make the final album.

On 21 June 2023, the band announced that it would be headlining four Primavera Sound festivals across South America and on 23 June it announced three standalone concerts with the Twilight Sad and Just Mustard performing as support acts.

== Ticket sales ==
Tickets for the North American leg of the tour were sold through Ticketmaster. When registration for ticket sales opened on 10 March, the band announced that tickets would be non-transferrable and that the band would not be using dynamic pricing, a process where ticketsellers alter prices given high or low demand, nor selling platinum tickets in order to keep tickets affordable for fans and to reduce the ability of resellers to resell tickets. Ticketholders would only be able to resell the tickets for face value on a ticket exchange. These choices led to tickets for the tour selling for an average of $68.57. On 15 March, Robert Smith tweeted that dynamic pricing was a "greedy scam" that artists chose to participate in. When asked for comment by Rolling Stone, StubHub, the biggest ticket reselling platform in the US, criticised the restrictions on ticket transferability, StubHub claimed they hurt consumer choice and encouraged artists to keep tickets transferrable. On 31 March, Smith said that 7,000 tickets that had been listed for resale on secondary markets had been identified and cancelled.

Ticket sales opened on 15 March. Soon after ticket sales opened, some fans posted screenshots on social media showing that the additional fees added onto the ticket prices were high relative to the price of the ticket, sometimes exceeding the price of the ticket itself. On 16 March, Smith tweeted that he was sickened by how high the additional fees were and would be asking how they were justified. The next day, Smith tweeted that after negotiations, Ticketmaster had agreed to refund a portion of the ticket fees as a gesture of goodwill. Buyers who had purchased the lowest-priced tickets would receive $10 and all other buyers would receive $5. He also said that tickets purchased after that day would incur lower fees.

== Set list ==
This set list is representative of the show on 10 May 2023, in New Orleans. It is not representative of all concerts for the duration of the tour.

1. "Alone"
2. "Pictures of You"
3. "A Night Like This"
4. "Lovesong"
5. "And Nothing Is Forever"
6. "The Last Day of Summer"
7. "A Fragile Thing"
8. "Cold"
9. "Burn"
10. "Fascination Street"
11. "Push"
12. "Play for Today"
13. "Shake Dog Shake"
14. "From the Edge of the Deep Green Sea"
15. "Endsong"
  Encore
16. "I Can Never Say Goodbye"
17. "Want"
18. "A Thousand Hours"
19. "At Night"
20. "A Forest"
  Encore 2
21. "Lullaby"
22. "Six Different Ways"
23. "The Walk"
24. "Friday I'm in Love"
25. "Doing the Unstuck"
26. "Close to Me"
27. "In Between Days"
28. "Just Like Heaven"
29. "Boys Don't Cry"

== Tour dates ==
European Leg
Date	City	Country	Venue	Opening acts	Attendance	Revenue
6 October 2022	Riga	Latvia	Arena Riga	The Twilight Sad	—	—
8 October 2022	Helsinki	Finland	Helsingin jäähalli	The Twilight Sad		
10 October 2022	Stockholm	Sweden	Avicii Arena	The Twilight Sad		
12 October 2022	Oslo	Norway	Oslo Spektrum	The Twilight Sad		
13 October 2022	Gothenburg	Sweden	Scandinavium	The Twilight Sad		
14 October 2022	Copenhagen	Denmark	Royal Arena	The Twilight Sad		
16 October 2022	Hamburg	Germany	Barclaycard Arena	The Twilight Sad		
17 October 2022	Leipzig	Germany	Quarterback Immobilien Arena	The Twilight Sad		
18 October 2022	Berlin	Germany	Mercedes-Benz Arena	The Twilight Sad		
20 October 2022	Kraków	Poland	Tauron Arena	The Twilight Sad		
21 October 2022	Łódź	Poland	Atlas Arena	The Twilight Sad		
23 October 2022	Vienna	Austria	Marx Halle	The Twilight Sad		
24 October 2022	Prague	Czech Republic	O2 Arena	The Twilight Sad		
26 October 2022	Budapest	Hungary	Budapest Sportaréna	The Twilight Sad		
27 October 2022	Zagreb	Croatia	Arena Zagreb	The Twilight Sad		
29 October 2022	Munich	Germany	Olympiahalle	The Twilight Sad		
31 October 2022	Bologna	Italy	Unipol Arena	The Twilight Sad		
1 November 2022	Florence	Italy	Nelson Mandela Forum	The Twilight Sad		
3 November 2022	Padua	Italy	Kioene Arena	The Twilight Sad		
4 November 2022	Milan	Italy	Forum di Milano	The Twilight Sad		
6 November 2022	Geneva	Switzerland	Geneva Arena	The Twilight Sad		
7 November 2022	Lyon	France	Halle Tony Garnier	The Twilight Sad		
8 November 2022	Montpellier	France	Sud de France Arena	The Twilight Sad		
10 November 2022	Barcelona	Spain	Palau Sant Jordi	The Twilight Sad		
11 November 2022	Madrid	Spain	WiZink Center	The Twilight Sad		
13 November 2022	Toulouse	France	Zénith de Lille	The Twilight Sad		
14 November 2022	Bordeaux	France	Arkéa Arena	The Twilight Sad		
15 November 2022	Nantes	France	Zénith de Nantes Métropole	The Twilight Sad		
17 November 2022	Frankfurt	Germany	Festhalle Frankfurt	The Twilight Sad		
18 November 2022	Strasbourg	France	Zénith de Strasbourg	The Twilight Sad		
19 November 2022	Basel	Switzerland	St. Jakobshalle	The Twilight Sad		
21 November 2022	Stuttgart	Germany	Hanns-Martin-Schleyer-Halle	The Twilight Sad		
22 November 2022	Cologne	Germany	Lanxess Arena	The Twilight Sad		
23 November 2022	Antwerp	Belgium	Sportpaleis	The Twilight Sad		
25 November 2022	Amsterdam	Netherlands	Ziggo Dome	The Twilight Sad		
27 November 2022	Liévin	France	Arena Stade Couvert de Liévin	The Twilight Sad		
28 November 2022	Paris	France	Accor Arena	The Twilight Sad		
1 December 2022	Dublin	Ireland	3Arena	The Twilight Sad		
2 December 2022	Belfast	Northern Ireland	SSE Arena	The Twilight Sad		
4 December 2022	Glasgow	Scotland	OVO Hydro	The Twilight Sad		
6 December 2022	Leeds	England	First Direct Arena	The Twilight Sad		
7 December 2022	Birmingham	England	Utilita Arena	The Twilight Sad		
8 December 2022	Cardiff	Wales	Motorpoint Arena	The Twilight Sad		
11 December 2022	London	England	OVO Arena Wembley	The Twilight Sad		
12 December 2022	London	England	OVO Arena Wembley	The Twilight Sad		
13 December 2022	London	England	OVO Arena Wembley	The Twilight Sad		

North American Leg
Date	City	Country	Venue	Opening acts	Attendance	Revenue
10 May 2023	New Orleans	United States	Smoothie King Center	The Twilight Sad	—	—
12 May 2023	Houston	United States	Toyota Center	The Twilight Sad		
13 May 2023	Dallas	United States	Dos Equis Pavilion	The Twilight Sad		
14 May 2023	Austin	United States	Moody Center	The Twilight Sad		
16 May 2023	Albuquerque	United States	Isleta Amphitheater	The Twilight Sad		
18 May 2023	Glendale (Note: Promoted as Phoenix.)	United States	Desert Diamond Arena	The Twilight Sad		
20 May 2023	Chula Vista (Note: Promoted as San Diego)	United States	North Island Credit Union Amphitheatre	The Twilight Sad		
21 May 2023	Chula Vista	United States	North Island Credit Union Amphitheatre	The Twilight Sad		
23 May 2023	Los Angeles	United States	Hollywood Bowl	The Twilight Sad		
24 May 2023	Los Angeles	United States	Hollywood Bowl	The Twilight Sad		
25 May 2023	Los Angeles	United States	Hollywood Bowl	The Twilight Sad		
27 May 2023	Mountain View (Note: Promoted as San Francisco.)	United States	Shoreline Amphitheatre	The Twilight Sad		
29 May 2023	Mountain View	United States	Shoreline Amphitheatre	The Twilight Sad		
31 May 2023	Portland	United States	Moda Center	The Twilight Sad		
1 June 2023	Seattle	United States	Climate Pledge Arena	The Twilight Sad		
2 June 2023	Vancouver	Canada	Rogers Arena	The Twilight Sad		
4 June 2023	Salt Lake City	United States	Vivint Smart Home Arena	The Twilight Sad		
6 June 2023	Greenwood Village (Note: Promoted as Denver.)	United States	Fiddler's Green Amphitheatre	The Twilight Sad		
8 June 2023	St. Paul (Note: Promoted as Minneapolis–Saint Paul.)	United States	Xcel Energy Center	The Twilight Sad		
10 June 2023	Chicago	United States	United Center	The Twilight Sad		
11 June 2023	Cuyahoga Falls (Note: Promoted as Cleveland.)	United States	Blossom Music Center	The Twilight Sad		
13 June 2023	Clarkston (Note: Promoted as Detroit.)	United States	Pine Knob Music Theatre	The Twilight Sad		
14 June 2023	Toronto	Canada	Budweiser Stage	The Twilight Sad		
16 June 2023	Montreal	Canada	Bell Centre	The Twilight Sad		
17 June 2023	Montreal	Canada	Bell Centre	The Twilight Sad		
18 June 2023	Mansfield (Note: Promoted as Boston.)	United States	Xfinity Center	The Twilight Sad		
20 June 2023	New York City	United States	Madison Square Garden	The Twilight Sad		
21 June 2023	New York City	United States	Madison Square Garden	The Twilight Sad		
22 June 2023	New York City	United States	Madison Square Garden	The Twilight Sad		
24 June 2023	Philadelphia	United States	Wells Fargo Center	The Twilight Sad		
25 June 2023	Columbia	United States	Merriweather Post Pavilion	The Twilight Sad		
27 June 2023	Atlanta	United States	State Farm Arena	The Twilight Sad		
28 June 2023	Atlanta	United States	State Farm Arena	The Twilight Sad		
29 June 2023	Tampa	United States	Amalie Arena	The Twilight Sad		
1 July 2023	Miami	United States	Kaseya Center	The Twilight Sad		
17 September 2023	Chicago	United States	Douglass Park (Note: This show was part of Riot Fest.)	—N/a		

South American Leg
Date	City	Country	Venue	Opening acts	Attendance	Revenue
19 November 2023	Mexico City	Mexico	Autodromo Hermanos Rodriguez (Note: This show was part of Corona Capital.)	—N/a	—	—
22 November 2023	Lima	Peru	Estadio Universidad San Marcos	The Twilight Sad; Just Mustard		
25 November 2023	Buenos Aires	Argentina	Sarmiento Park (Note: This show was part of Primavera Sound.)	—N/a		
27 November 2023	Montevideo	Uruguay	Antel Arena	Just Mustard		
30 November 2023	Santiago	Chile	Estadio Monumental David Arellano	Just Mustard; FrioLento; The Cruel Visions		
3 December 2023	São Paulo	Brazil	Interlagos Circuit	—N/a		
7 December 2023	Asunción	Paraguay	Parque Olímpico	—N/a		
10 December 2023	Bogotá	Colombia	Movistar Arena	—N/a		
