= A Fragile Thing =

Single by the Cure

from the album Songs of a Lost World
- Released: 9 October 2024
- Genre: Rock
- Length: 4:43
- Label: Polydor
- Songwriter: Robert Smith
- Producers: Robert Smith; Paul Corkett

The Cure singles chronology
"Alone" (2024)	"A Fragile Thing" (2024)	"All I Ever Am" (2025)

Lyric video
- "A Fragile Thing" on YouTube

"A Fragile Thing" is a song by the English rock band the Cure from their fourteenth studio album, Songs of a Lost World (2024). Robert Smith noted that the track was originally titled "Kill the Sun", and that it changed greatly before its final version. "A Fragile Thing" is a rock song that begins with a piano introduction before other instruments and Smith's vocals enter. Smith commented that "A Fragile Thing" was lyrically about the simultaneous strength and fragility of love; music critics observed that the lyrics came from the perspective of an ex-lover speaking towards the track's protagonist. The track was written by Smith, and was produced by him and Paul Corkett.

The Cure debuted "A Fragile Thing" on 4 November 2022 during their Shows of a Lost World concert tour, and it became a staple of that tour. Later, the song received an official released as the second single off Songs of a Lost World on 9 October 2024. Music critics praised "A Fragile Thing" for its sound and mood. It peaked at number 5 on the UK Singles Sales Chart and at number 14 on the US Rock & Alternative Airplay chart.

== Background and release ==
After the release of 4:13 Dream in 2008, the Cure prioritised touring in the 2010s instead of recording and releasing new music. The band initially announced in early 2014 that their next studio album, a follow-up to 4:13 Dream titled 4:14 Scream, would be released later that year. However, the album was never released. Similarly, the band considered creating a new album to commemorate their 40th anniversary in 2018, however it never materialised. Later, in 2019, the band once again began recording new music, under the working title Live From the Moon. The tracks created during these sessions eventually became Songs of a Lost World.

According to Smith, "A Fragile Thing" began as a song titled "Kill the Sun". He commented on the difficulty of writing the track, saying that it transformed significantly before reaching its final version. The Cure debuted "A Fragile Thing" live on 4 November 2022 at the Forum di Milano as part of their 2022–2023 Shows of a Lost World concert tour, and it subsequently became a staple during the tour. Later, the band released a snippet of "A Fragile Thing" on 6 October 2024 via social media, and released the full single on 9 October alongside the tracklist of Songs of a Lost World.

A radio edit of "A Fragile Thing", in addition to a "RS24" remix by Smith and a live performance of the song, was released as an EP later that year on 29 November. Additionally, on 13 June 2025, remixes of "A Fragile Thing" by Âme, Sally C, and The Twilight Sad were included on Mixes of a Lost World. A version by Mark Saunders, dubbed the "Heartbroken Remix", was released independent of the remix album a week later.

== Composition and lyrics ==
"A Fragile Thing" is a midtempo rock song. The song begins with a piano introduction before bass and guitar enter, followed by Smith's "conversational" vocals fifty seconds into the track. Instrumentally, both Jon Blistein of Rolling Stone and Alison Ross of PopMatters found that the song's guitars sounded "yearning"; the former additionally applied this label to the song's synths, while the latter compared the piano line to those by John Carpenter and called its bass "abrasive". Ross also noted "A Fragile Thing"'s "slightly jazzy" beat, while Bill Pearis of BrooklynVegan observed of the heavy use of tom drums in the track's percussion.

Music critics took note of the track's pop sound; both Pearis and Sam Walker-Smart of Clash commented that it was the most pop-like song on Songs of a Lost World, while John Robb of Louder than War wrote that the song was "pop music on its own terms" due to its upbeat sound contrasting its emotional lyrics. Multiple critics also compared the track's sound to other works by the band: Pearis likened it to Kiss Me Kiss Me Kiss Me (1987), Tom Breihan of Stereogum to Disintegration (1989), and Martin O'Gorman of Radio X to "Wendy Time" off Wish (1992). Joshua Mills of The Line of Best Fit additionally found the song's "driving" bass to be reminiscent of the band's previous post-punk sound, and Jo Vito of Consequence found the guitar line to be "quintessentially Cure-ish".

Lyrically, Smith explained that "A Fragile Thing" explores the simultaneous strength and fragility of love. Smith further explained that the track was "driven by the difficulties we face in choosing between mutually exclusive needs", and the subsequent angst felt over whether one made the right decision. Ross called the track a "resigned musing about love's brittleness", while Walker-Smart characterised the song as Smith "dropping harsh truths about how love and commitment can be a blessing and a curse". Various critics touched on the song's use of perspective. Lauren Boisvert of American Songwriter observed that the lyric "'Every time you kiss me I could cry,' she said" revealed that the lines in the song were being spoken as though in a conversation, while Elise Soutar of Paste described the "speaker" in the track as being "resolute in her denial of Smith's protagonist". Similarly, Pearis described the song's lyrics as "read[ing] like a letter from an ex-lover".

== Reception ==
"A Fragile Thing" received positive reviews from music critics. Gil Kaufman of Billboard, John Murphy of MusicOMH, and Pearis all called the track "classic Cure". Particular praise was directed towards Smith's vocal performance, with Clash's Robin Murray calling it "hugely impressive" and Billboard's Al Shipley deeming it the best on the album. John Kinsella, writing for The Saturday Paper, noted how "A Fragile Thing", like the band's previous song "A Forest", managed to create a simultaneous bright and dark mood through its "bold if emotionally suppressed" opening. Similarly, Todd Dedman of Beats per Minute commented on the contrast between the track's "sprightly" arrangement and its darker lyrical themes. Pearis found the song's chorus to the best on Songs of a Lost World; meanwhile, Boisvert named it one of the three best songs on the album, while Shipley declared it as its best in his ranking of the record.

In the United Kingdom, "A Fragile Thing" peaked at No. 5 on the UK Singles Sales Chart, and reached No. 83 on the UK Singles Downloads Chart. Elsewhere, the track charted at No. 14 on Billboard's Rock & Alternative Airplay chart in the United States. "A Fragile Thing" also charted at No. 14 on the Billboard Alternative Airplay chart, and was their first appearance on that chart since "The Only One" in 2008, and their highest charting single since "Mint Car" reached the same position in 1996.

== Personnel ==
Credits adapted from Apple Music.

=== The Cure ===
- Robert Smith – guitar, vocals, keyboards, bass, songwriter, producer, mixing engineer, assistant recording engineer
- Simon Gallup – bass
- Jason Cooper – drums, percussion
- Roger O'Donnell – keyboards
- Reeves Gabrels – guitar

=== Additional personnel ===
- Paul Corkett – producer, mixing engineer, recording engineer
- Matt Colton – mastering engineer
- Bunny Lake – assistant recording engineer
- Jack Boston – assistant recording engineer
- Joe Jones – assistant recording engineer

== Charts ==
Chart performance for "A Fragile Thing"
Chart (2024–2025)	Peak position
UK Singles Downloads (OCC)	83
UK Singles Sales (OCC)	5
US Rock & Alternative Airplay (Billboard)	14
