= Public trustee =

Public office

The public trustee is an office established pursuant to national (and, if applicable, state or territory) statute, to act as a trustee, usually when a sum is required to be deposited as security by legislation, if courts remove another trustee, or for estates if either no executor is named by will or the testator elects to name the public trustee.

== Commonwealth ==
=== Origins ===
The first public trustee is that of New Zealand; it was proposed by Edward Cephas John Stevens in 1870 due to the difficulty of finding reliable private trustees in the colony and adopted by Prime Minister Julius Vogel who established the Public Trust and installed Jonas Woodward as the world's first public trustee on January 1, 1873. Initially it was a part-time for position for one man, the government had not anticipated that much of the public would prefer to trust a bureaucrat with their estate – by the mid 20th century the New Zealand Public Trustee gained nearly one-third of the estate market in the country, was undertaking many statutory duties beyond this and employed a staff of a thousand. Meanwhile, the idea was spreading, initially across the Tasman, where South Australia established a public trustee on the same model on 1 January 1881, making it the first public trustee established in Australia.

=== Australia ===
There is a public trustee in each state, province and territory of Australia. The public trustee primarily performs the role of trustee of deceased's estates where no executor is appointed, or the executor declines to act (and no other person is appropriate). Some public trustees also provide a free or inexpensive service for drawing wills (receiving remuneration upon administering the estate). The public trustees also manage the estates of infants (such as in cases where they receive a damages settlement), prisoners, and others under a disability (legal or otherwise), when required. The public trustee may also act as trustee of unclaimed property in some states.

=== New Zealand ===
Although much reduced in size after a series of restructurings in the 1990s, and unsuccessful moves into conveyancing, unit trust-like investments and other non-core business, which led to large losses at the end of the decade, the office has now returned to profit. As at 2005 it held over 330,000 wills and drafted over 21,000 wills per year, managed 3,500 residential properties, 400 charitable trusts and 30 farms, employing 450 people at 35 offices. Public Trust was a corporation sole until 2001, when it was moved to a company-like structure called a 'Crown entity'.

=== Other nations ===
The office of public trustee was adopted by several other countries of the Commonwealth, including Sri Lanka, Hong Kong, Singapore, and most Canadian provinces.

== England and Wales ==
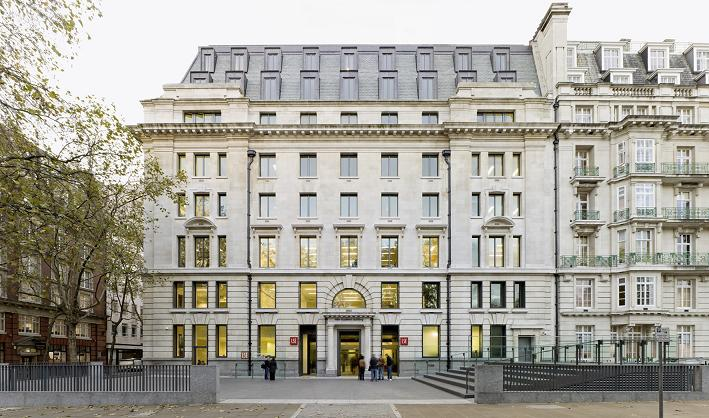
The office of the UK Public Trustee was in Sardinia Street from 1916 to 2005.

The public trustee is a national position under English law with a far more limited role than its Commonwealth namesakes. Since 1994 the property of someone dying intestate vests in the public trustee until a grant of letters of administration is made to an administrator or administrators (prior to 1994 it vested in the President of the Family Division).
