= Songs of a Lost World =

Studio album by the Cure
- Released: 1 November 2024
- Recorded: 2019–2022
- Studios: Rockfield (Monmouthshire, Wales)
- Genres: Gothic rock; post-rock; ethereal wave; dark wave
- Length: 49:13
- Labels: Fiction; Lost; Polydor; Universal; Capitol
- Producers: Robert Smith; Paul Corkett

The Cure chronology
Torn Down (2018)	Songs of a Lost World (2024)	Mixes of a Lost World (2025)

Singles from Songs of a Lost World
- 1. "Alone" Released: 26 September 2024; 2. "A Fragile Thing" Released: 9 October 2024; 3. "All I Ever Am" Released: 10 January 2025

Songs of a Lost World is the fourteenth studio album by the English rock band the Cure, released on 1 November 2024 via Fiction, Lost Music, Universal, Polydor, and Capitol Records. It is the band's first release of new material in 16 years since the release of 4:13 Dream in 2008. All the songs on the album were composed solely by singer/guitarist Robert Smith, for the first time since the 1985 album The Head on the Door. It is also their first studio album to feature guitarist Reeves Gabrels. The record was released a day after Halloween at Smith's request.

Upon release, the album received critical acclaim, with particular praise for the lyrics, dark sound, and Smith's vocals. It was also a commercial success, being their first album since Wish (1992) to reach number one in the UK, and was also one of the fastest selling albums of 2024, having at one point outsold the entire top 10 of the week combined. It also reached number one in Austria, Belgium, Denmark, France, Germany, Greece, the Netherlands, Poland, Sweden and Switzerland. It gave the band three BRIT Award nominations for Mastercard Album of the Year, Group of the Year and Alternative/Rock Act. The album won the Grammy Award for Best Alternative Music Album at the 68th Annual Grammy Awards in 2026, and the single "Alone" won Best Alternative Music Performance at the same ceremony.

The live album Songs of a Live World: Troxy London MMXXlV, recorded at The Cure's album launch show at the Troxy in East London, was released on 13 December 2024. A remix album, Mixes of a Lost World, was released on 13 June 2025.

== Background ==
Songs of a Lost World was several years in the making, and is the Cure's first studio album since 4:13 Dream in 2008. The album was originally intended for release in 2019. It is the band's first full-length album to feature Reeves Gabrels on guitar since he joined as a full-time member in 2012, although he was previously featured on the band's 1997 single "Wrong Number". It also features the studio return of keyboardist Roger O'Donnell, who rejoined the band in 2011 after a six-year hiatus. Five of the album's songs, including "Alone", had been performed live in 2022 and 2023 during their Shows of a Lost World international tour. Multi-instrumentalist Perry Bamonte rejoined the band in 2022 for that tour, but does not appear on the album as most of the recording was completed in 2019.

The songs were entirely written, composed, and arranged by Robert Smith. During the writing process, Smith had difficulty "find[ing] the right imagery" for the lyrics to "Alone", ultimately finding inspiration from the Ernest Dowson poem "Dregs". AllMusic described the song as "dense swirls of synths, simple, pounding drums", noting that "themes of loss, isolation, impermanence, and mortality" were present in the lyrics.

"I Can Never Say Goodbye" was written after Smith's brother's death; he said he "didn't want the words to dominate the song, in a way that the music can become a backdrop to what you're singing. In this, I think the music is more important than what I'm singing in a way. It's a very difficult song to sing. People say 'cathartic' too much, but it was. It allowed me to deal with it, and I think it's helped me enormously." NME called the song a highlight on the album, saying it "lays waste with an emotional H-bomb". Smith has said earlier versions of the song were "so overwrought", reportedly being told by people he would play them to they were "too much". He also expressed difficulties with performing the song live, saying "sometimes it would really break me up and it was really difficult to not go over the top." "Endsong" was inspired by a starlit night that reminded Smith of when he watched Apollo 11 land on the Moon in 1969 with his father in their backyard.

In several interviews following the release, Smith noted that the album was originally intended to be much darker, with his wife Mary Poole ultimately stating that "people won't listen to this", resulting in several track changes and revisions, such as the inclusion of "Warsong" and "Drone:Nodrone", both of which were not on the original running order. A final song, "Bodiam Sky", initially concluded the album following "Endsong". Although cut from the final release, its lyrics still appear printed halfway through the album's accompanying lyric booklet. This track, along with other omissions, is expected to be released on the "companion piece" to Songs of a Lost World, tentatively to be released in 2026.

== Artwork ==
Smith chose Bagatelle, a 1975 sculpture by Slovenian artist Janez Pirnat, to illustrate the sleeve. The album cover was then designed by Andy Vella. Robert Smith has since stated in interviews that he now owns the sculpture.

== Promotion ==
The album's release was officially announced on 26 September 2024, with the release of the lead single, "Alone", and a dedicated website. The track listing was revealed by an email sent to mailing list members on 9 October 2024, and was subsequently posted on the Cure's official website.

The second single, "A Fragile Thing", was released on 9 October 2024. On 14 October 2024, Smith said that a tour in support of Songs of a Lost World will begin in "autumn next year" after the completion of a projected follow-up album.

The band performed a concert at BBC Radio Theatre on 31 October, one hour broadcast by BBC Radio 2 on the In Concert show including versions of "Alone", "A Fragile Thing" and "Endsong", and another hour broadcast by BBC Radio 6 Music for Huw Stephens show, including versions of "I Can Never Say Goodbye", "And Nothing Is Forever" and "All I Ever Am".

The album was launched worldwide with a concert that the band played at the Troxy in London on 1 November 2024. The show was streamed live on YouTube.

== Release ==
The record was made available after Halloween's evening at Smith's request – it was a demand he had specifically made at his record company's director. The album was officially out at midnight.

It was released on multiple formats. The vinyl was released through six different variants in the UK, all pressed on bioplastic on Polydor: black, marble stone, marble stone with obi, white, picture disc and picture disc 'glow in the dark'. Another vinyl edition was double half-speed mastered version. A further US bioplastic vinyl was released on Capitol records. There were also a cassette edition and a double cassette. A further "blood red moon" vinyl edition was released – a line taken from "Endsong" – featuring a red hue to the regular artwork and including the regular songs plus their instrumental counterparts.

In addition to the standard CD, a 2×CD+Blu-Ray deluxe edition featuring instrumental versions of all 8 songs was also released, along with a Blu-ray featuring Hi-Res stereo and Dolby Atmos mixes of the songs.

A further digital-only deluxe edition of the album was released on 5 November 2024, featuring live versions of five songs from the album performed at Shoreline Amphitheater in 2023. This edition features unique faded/white artwork.

The album went to number one on the UK Albums Chart, with 51,362 sales in the first week (19,838 CDs, 23,182 vinyl albums, 1,219 cassettes, 4,546 digital downloads and 2,577 sales-equivalent streams). It also reached the number one position in France, selling 20,678 units the first week.

The album also reached number four on the Billboard 200 in the week ending November 7, their highest position since 1992's Wish. Sales reached 57,000 equivalent album units, of which 53,000 were from album sales, their best sales week since their 2004 self-titled album.

A 7″ vinyl release for the single "A Fragile Thing" was released on 11 November 2024, featuring two remixes of the song by Smith: "RS24 Mix" on side A and "RS24 Remix" on side B. On 29 November, a 3-track digital single was also released. This included a radio edit, the "RS24 Remix" version and a live version: "Live Troxy London MMXXIV".

=== Companion releases ===
On 21 April 2025, the band announced a remix album, Mixes of a Lost World, featuring 24 reworks of songs from Songs of a Lost World by artists including Four Tet, Paul Oakenfold, and Orbital. The album was released on 13 June by Fiction Records and Capitol Records.

== Critical reception ==
Professional ratings
Aggregate scores
Source	Rating
AnyDecentMusic?	8.8/10
Metacritic	93/100
Review scores
Source	Rating
AllMusic	4.5/5 stars
Clash	9/10
The Guardian	5/5 stars
The Irish Times	4/5 stars
The Line of Best Fit	8/10
Mojo	4/5 stars
NME	5/5 stars
Pitchfork	7.9/10
The Times	5/5 stars
Uncut	9/10

According to the review aggregator Metacritic, Songs of a Lost World received "universal acclaim" based on a weighted average score of 93 out of 100 from 25 critic scores. Franck Vergeade of Les Inrockuptibles reported that "only two listens were authorized by the record company" to review the album: he qualified it "flamboyant gothic". Andrew Trendell of NME gave the album a five-star review, stating "there's always enough heart in the darkness and opulence in the sound to hold you", and believed it was "arguably the most personal album of Smith's career. Mortality may loom, but there's colour in the black and flowers on the grave".

Éamon de Paor of The Irish Times praised the album, giving it four stars and describing it as "majestically desolate, gorgeously grim", adding that it "moves like a glacier at midnight – magnificent, unstoppable and with a chill that settles in hard and heavy and does not leave". De Paor likened the sound of the album to bands such as Nine Inch Nails, Cocteau Twins, Pink Floyd, and New Order.

Sam Walker-Smart of Clash gave a score of 9/10, and felt the album "is one of their most emotionally raw", citing "Endsong" as the highlight of the album. John Robb of Louder Than War gave the album a score of 5/5, observing, "An album of elegiac, brooding masterpieces that deal with the heartbreak of loss with dark, masterful music dripping with melody, nuance and atmosphere."

Victoria Segal of Mojo gave the album four out of five stars, praising Smith's vocals: "On a record so alert to the cataclysmic effects of mortality, it's remarkable how fundamentally unchanged Smith's voice is", while also noting the album lacked anything "approaching a pop song ... The 'Never Enough' grooves of the spectacular 'Drone' slide closest to a gear-change, but even there, the ground is unsteady." The Times's Will Hodgkinson praised it in a five-star review saying: "On the goth rockers' first album in 16 years, Robert Smith tackles the death of loved ones and his own demise in music of expansive sophistication."

Fred Thomas of AllMusic praised the album and felt the eight songs "often reach the same slow-moving grandeur of the Cure's high-water mark album, 1989's Disintegration, only without any of the playful pop". Rob Sheffield of Rolling Stone gave the album four out of five stars, saying, "Robert Smith reaches into the depths of his cobwebbed heart; it's the best Cure album since Disintegration", describing the album as a "vividly propulsive space-rock goth elegy, eight songs in fifty minutes, kicking with a full-blooded band attack".

However, the German edition of Rolling Stone was less enthusiastic and criticised the album for "flat songs" that sounded "redundant" with endless introductions.

=== Accolades ===
Songs of a Lost World won Best Alternative Music Album at the 68th Annual Grammy Awards.

Select year-end rankings for Songs of a Lost World
Publication/critic	Accolade	Rank	Ref.
The A.V. Club	25 Best Albums of 2024	3	
Exclaim!	50 Best Albums of 2024	28	
The Independent	The Best Albums of 2024	8	
Louder Than War	Top 100 Albums of 2024	2	
Loudwire	The 11 Best Rock Albums of 2024	4	
MOJO	The Best Albums Of 2024	31	
Mondo Sonoro	Best International Albums of 2024	3	
MusicOMH	Top 50 Albums of 2024	2	
The Ringer	30 Best Albums of 2024	3	
Rough Trade UK	Albums of the Year 2024	23	
Spin	Best Album of 2024	1	
The Telegraph	10 Best Albums of 2024	3	
Time Out	The Best Albums of 2024	5	
Uncut	80 Best Albums of 2024	69	
Vulture	Best Albums of 2024	1	

== Track listing ==
All tracks are written by Robert Smith.

Songs of a Lost World track listing
No.	Title	Length
1.	"Alone"	6:48
2.	"And Nothing Is Forever"	6:53
3.	"A Fragile Thing"	4:43
4.	"Warsong"	4:17
5.	"Drone:Nodrone"	4:45
6.	"I Can Never Say Goodbye"	6:03
7.	"All I Ever Am"	5:21
8.	"Endsong"	10:23
Total length:		49:13

== Personnel ==
Credits adapted from the album's liner notes and Tidal.

=== The Cure ===
- Robert Smith – vocals, guitars, six-string bass, keyboards, arrangements, production, mixing, recording assistance, sleeve concept, pictures of stone
- Simon Gallup – bass
- Jason Cooper – drums, percussion
- Roger O'Donnell – keyboards
- Reeves Gabrels – guitars

=== Additional contributors ===
- Paul Corkett – production, recording, mixing
- Jack Boston – recording assistance
- Joe Jones – recording assistance
- Bunny Lake – recording assistance
- Matt Colton – digital and CD mastering
- Miles Showell – vinyl mastering
- Andy Vella – art, design
- Janez Pirnat – Bagatelle sculpture

== Charts ==
=== Weekly charts ===
Weekly chart performance for Songs of a Lost World
Chart (2024)	Peak position
Australian Albums (ARIA)	5
Austrian Albums (Ö3 Austria)	1
Belgian Albums (Ultratop Flanders)	1
Belgian Albums (Ultratop Wallonia)	1
Canadian Albums (Billboard)	12
Czech Albums (ČNS IFPI)	29
Danish Albums (Hitlisten)	1
Dutch Albums (Album Top 100)	1
Finnish Albums (Suomen virallinen lista)	7
French Albums (SNEP)	1
French Rock & Metal Albums (SNEP)	1
German Albums (Offizielle Top 100)	1
Greek Albums (IFPI)	1
Hungarian Albums (MAHASZ)	7
Icelandic Albums (Tónlistinn)	17
Irish Albums (Official Charts)	3
Italian Albums (FIMI)	2
Japanese Digital Albums (Oricon)	45
Lithuanian Albums (AGATA)	80
New Zealand Albums (RMNZ)	3
Norwegian Albums (VG-lista)	5
Polish Albums (ZPAV)	1
Portuguese Albums (AFP)	1
Scottish Albums (Official Charts)	1
Slovak Albums (ČNS IFPI)	88
Spanish Albums (PROMUSICAE)	2
Swedish Albums (Sverigetopplistan)	1
Swiss Albums (Schweizer Hitparade)	1
UK Albums (Official Charts)	1
US Billboard 200	4
US Top Rock & Alternative Albums (Billboard)	1
US Indie Store Album Sales (Billboard)	1

=== Year-end charts ===
2024 year-end chart performance for Songs of a Lost World
Chart (2024)	Position
Austrian Albums (Ö3 Austria)	45
Belgian Albums (Ultratop Flanders)	33
Belgian Albums (Ultratop Wallonia)	24
French Albums (SNEP)	62
German Albums (Offizielle Top 100)	20
Polish Albums (ZPAV)	89
Spanish Albums (PROMUSICAE)	94
Swiss Albums (Schweizer Hitparade)	15

2025 year-end chart performance for Songs of a Lost World
Chart (2025)	Position
German Albums (Offizielle Top 100)	83

== Certifications ==
Certifications for Songs of a Lost World
Region	Certification	Certified units/sales
Italy (FIMI)	Gold	25,000^{‡}
France (SNEP)	Gold	50,000^{‡}
Poland (ZPAV)	Gold	15,000^{‡}
United Kingdom (BPI)	Gold	100,000^{‡}
^{‡} Sales+streaming figures based on certification alone.
