= XOL DOG 400 =

German hardcore-techno music project

XOL DOG 400 is a German hardcore techno music project of Christian Müller, mostly publishing gabber and terrorcore tracks.

XOL DOG 400 was founded in 1992 in Berlin as successor of the electronic body music act "Le Nokto Vezyn". In contrast to the short lifetimes typical of early techno projects, XOL DOG 400 has continued its activity through to the present.

XOL DOG 400 has published several CDs and vinyl recordings, as well as contributing many tracks on samplers such as the Terrordrome compilations.

XOL DOG 400 also recorded a John Peel session for Peel's Radio show on BBC 1 and was the only German act to play at the 1998 Meltdown Festival in London hosted by John Peel.

With side projects ("Antizycle") XOL DOG 400 publishes also ambient music, worked as remixer (f.e. for NewMind) and wrote scores.

XOL DOG 400 is a co-founder of the Fuckparade.
