= JoyCut =

Italian electronic music group

- Origin: Italy
- Genres: Electronics, dark wave, post-rock
- Years active: 2007–present
- Website: joycut.com

JoyCut are an Italian electronic, dark wave, post-rock band based in Bologna. Their music includes a weaving of powerful sonic moments using a mass of electronics, orchestral breathings, cinematic saturations, tribal drumming and industrial percussion with found objects from the urban landscape.

== History ==
JoyCut is formed by Pasquale Pezzillo, the founding member (contents, voice, guitar, electronics), Gaël Califano (industrial percussion) and Matilde Benvenuti (tribal drum).

Having opened and toured with bands such as Arcade Fire, Editors, Art Brut, Modest Mouse and Sebadoh, the trio won over North American fans on their first proper US tour in spring of 2014. On the tour they were introduced to Nic Harcourt of KCSN has become a supporter. The VISA World Cup commercial score was secured through their SXSW International Day Stage Performance. They were MTV Artist of the Week in April 2014 and featured in Under the Radar magazine in the July 2014 issue.

Their 2014 album PiecesOfUsWereLeftOnTheGround was followed by a tour across Italy, France, Belgium, the Netherlands, Germany, Spain, Czech Republic, Estonia, Latvia, Iceland, USA, Canada and Asia.

JoyCut's music has also been featured on a television series dedicated to famous Italian literature, produced by the company Sky Arts.

In 2016, the band toured and performed with The Chemical Brothers.

In 2017, after a TEDx talk and performance in Verona, JoyCut played a sold-out show at the Venice Biennale.

In 2018, following a residency at Clermont- Ferrand's (FR) Coopérative de Mai and IMAGO's studios, JoyCut began work on a new album with a planned release in early 2019.

On 15 June 2018, JoyCut played at the Purcell Room as part of the Meltdown festival curated by Robert Smith of The Cure.

== Discography ==
JoyCut have released three(?) studio albums:

- 2007 - The Very Strange Tale of Mr.Man
- 2011 - GhostTreesWhereToDisappear
- 2013 - PiecesOfUsWereLeftOnTheGround
- 2022 - TheBluWave [TimesWhenSilenceIsAPoem -TheIceHasMelted - AndBleedingGlaciersFormOurTears]

=== Additional work ===
JoyCut has also created tracks through collaborations with producer Jason Halbert (Kelly Clarkson) and young American artist Kennedy Nöel a.k.a. Krigarè.

== Awards and nominations ==
JoyCut was in the Top 5 of ETEP 2015, Europavox (FR), Monkey Week & MMVV (ES), Copenhagen Festival (DK), SXSW 2014, 2015 (US), CMJ (US), Culture Collide (US), Les Nuits (BE), Eurosonic (NL), Rock For People (CZ), Tallinn Music Week (EE), Reeperbahn Festival (DE), Liverpool Sound City (UK), Galapagai (LT), Festival Indigènes (FR), Chorus Festival (FR), Loftas Fest (LT), and I-Day (IT).

== Philosophy ==
=== Environment ===
JoyCut incorporates environmental sustainability into its operations, utilizing eco-friendly practices throughout its production processes.

Commitment to environmental issues has led JoyCut to participate in many sustainability green projects and campaigns. From recording the anthem Clean Planet, composed as a testament to Mother Nature's rights, to recording at studios completely powered by solar panels, JoyCut recycle and up-cycle all sorts of materials and machines as part of its setup. "We use only mater-bi and biophan for the packaging, and water based inks and vegetable glues for printing." JoyCut works towards reducing its environmental impact as much as possible.

Nature has always been at the heart of our philosophy, because it inspires us conceptually during our musical research and exploration, as well as allowing us to innovate. It's been a real eye-opener for us, after such a long time, to discover that innovation can also come from nature: nature, although it is pastoral and fierce, doesn't just stand there watching us and is also capable of interacting and even becoming technology.

We carried out various sustainability campaigns with International Associations, such as 350.org, and our very own Italian Climate Network, but above all, we carried out a campaign called GhostTreesForest.

In 2009 all 120,000 copies of the La Repubblica's influential XL magazine were wrapped in "Mater-bi" a bio-plastic made from potato starch.

Our main objective was to show to a larger audience that a tactile earthy experience can still, somehow always be part of everyday life, and in some ways it can lead us to discover something we should have already known. Together with the magazine came a leaflet explaining how bio-plastic is made, and a CD showcasing the nature of our sound, a free CD wrapped in 100% biodegradable packaging, made of plant-derived glues and water-based inks; even our band merchandising can consist of biologic and natural fibers.

=== #WeAreAllCaptains campaign ===
Wearing JoyCut armband Parma Calcio 1913 won the 2016-2017 championship. The football team was promoted from Lega Pro to Serie B without losing any matches. Potenza Calcio is now wearing JoyCut armband and it is first in his league.
