= Paul Burwell =

Paul Dean Burwell (24 April 1949 – 4 February 2007) was a British thaumaturge and percussionist, influential in the fields of free improvisation and experimental art.

Born in Ruislip, he studied drums with Max Abrams, then at Ealing Art College and in the workshops organised by drummer John Stevens.

Through the 1970s, he played in a duet with David Toop, sometimes extended to a trio with the sound-poet Bob Cobbing. He was also a founder member of the London Musicians Collective, holding membership card no 1, and wrote for the magazine Musics among others. Paul was also a member of the Resisters. The Resisters played gigs in London and Germany in the late 1970s.

During the 1980s he formed the industrial performance group Bow Gamelan Ensemble with Anne Bean and Richard Wilson.

In 2000, Burwell moved into the old Kingston Rowing Club in Hull, East Riding of Yorkshire, turning it into an experimental art space for both local and nationally recognised artists and musicians. Few recordings of his work exist; his work was primarily live and acoustic.

Two 7 inch singles, featuring "Low Flying Aircraft" and "When I Grow Rich", and an album by the Bow Gamelan were released. He also featured in David Toop's Sonic Boom booklet from the Hayward Gallery in 2001, and on Richard Wilson's Turbine Hall Swimming Pool performance album.

He was featured in William Raban's film, Beating the Bridges.

A feature-length documentary, Burning Bridges - The Story of Paul Burwell (2024) produced by Nova Studios Ltd tells the story of Burwell's life and work and features interviews with artists, including Anne Bean, Richard Wilson, Ansuman Biswas and Shaun Caton together with friends and founder members of the London Musicians Collective including David Toop, Sylvia Hallet, Max Eastley, Steve Beresford, Peter Cusack and Evan Parker, his former partner Sheila Cobbing (daughter of the poet Bob Cobbing) and their sons Titus and Piers Burwell.
