= Anne Bean =

London-based performance artist (born 1950)

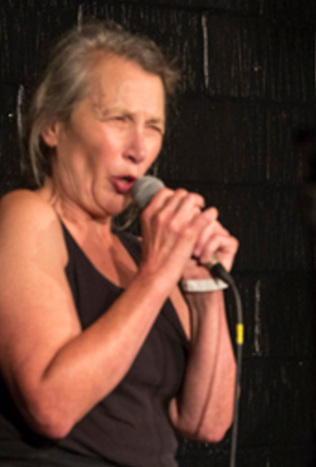
- Bean in 2016
- Known for: Painting, sculpture, performance, happening, drawing
- Website: annebean.net

Anne Bean (born 1950) is a London-based artist who works in installation, large-scale sculpture, sound art, and performance art. She was born in Livingstone in Northern Rhodesia (now Maramba, Zambia). She lives in Limehouse in the East End of London.

== Education and early career ==
Resident in the UK, Bean moved to England in 1969 after beginning her art education in South Africa at the University of Cape Town. She attended Reading University, graduating in 1973.

A central figure in the English live art scene, Anne Bean is a difficult artist to categorize. Her evocative work encompasses a range of media including slide projections, drawing, photography, video and sound using a wide range of materials from fire and pyrotechnics to weather balloons and wind to steam and honey. Since 1970, Anne has presented solo and collaborative projects incorporating static and time-based visual art, sound and performance extensively at art venues, festivals and unique sites throughout Europe, USA, Africa, Mexico and Japan.

She was a founding member of the irreverent pseudo pop-band Moody and the Menstruators (1971–74), which was imagined by the artist as an exploration of the boundaries between art and music. The Moodies' first performance was presented alongside an early gig by Roxy Music. They developed a cult following and found themselves featured in a double page spread in the Sunday Times in 1974. Bean was also a regular collaborator with the audacious duo The Kipper Kids (1971-2003).

== Methodology ==
Informed by improvisational practices that celebrate the chaotic and polyvocal and driven by a deep interest in materials and what they might be able to do, Anne Bean's practice has been influenced by Joseph Beuys’ concept of social sculpture (soziale Plastik) as well as the strange humour associated with the 1970s English performance art scene, typified perhaps by her extensive collaborations with the Kipper Kids. Bean's interest in collaborative processes began with her work with the pioneering performance art group Bernsteins, with Jonathan Harvey, Malcolm Jones, and the Kipper Kids, and continued to develop during her longterm working relationship with the drummer-artist Paul Burwell, and sculptor Richard Wilson. Together they formed the performance group, the Bow Gamelan Ensemble (1983–90).

== Recent projects ==
PAVES Crossing Zones was initiated by Anne Bean in 2009. PAVES was a collaborative project between artists Anne Bean, Sinead O'Donnell, Poshya Kakl, Efi Ben-David and Vlasta Delimar that spanned England, Scotland, Ireland, Israel, Croatia and Palestine. The project focused on how political contexts shape artistic work.

In 2012 Bean took on the consciousness of the alter-ego, artist, and writer Chana Dubinski. Bean spent 16 months living as Chana in Newark, a small town in England, and produced a series of artworks that were exhibited at the 2013 Venice Biennale.

In 2019, a solo exhibition was held by England & Co in London: Anne Bean: How Things Used to Now incorporated painting, sculpture, photography, film and live performance.

The recent book, Anne Bean: Self Etc. published by Live Art Development Agency and Intellect Books (ISBN 978-1-78320-946-0) provides documentation of Bean's performances, drawings, videos, installations, and sculptures, as well as writings, interviews and visual essays by the artist, together with several commissioned critical essays.

Bean works with England & Co, London and Artsadmin.

== Awards ==
Anne Bean performed for Helmut Schmidt and Henry Kissinger and has been awarded the Time Out Dance and Performance Award twice. In 2008 Bean was awarded the Legacy: Thinker in Residence award by Tate Research and the Live Art Development Agency with which she produced a DVD titled TAPS: Improvisations with Paul Burwell.

== Gallery ==
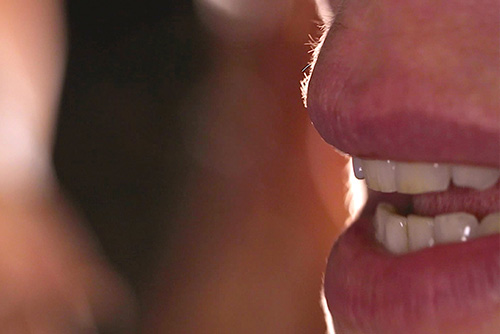
’’Evaporations’’ (2013)

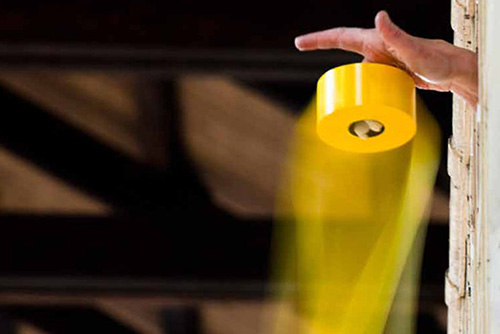
’’Wake’’ (2011)

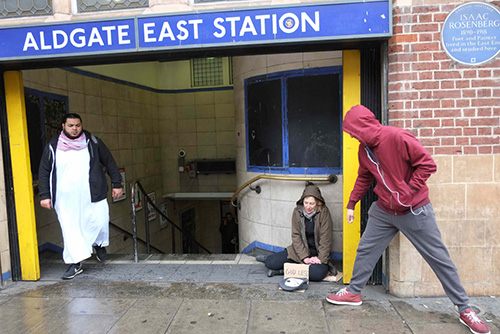
’’Holding Infinity in the Palm of my Hand ’’ (2015)

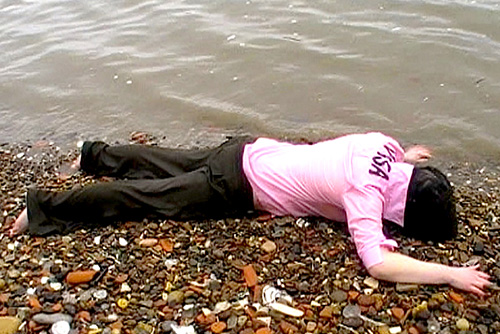
’’Paves’’ (2010)

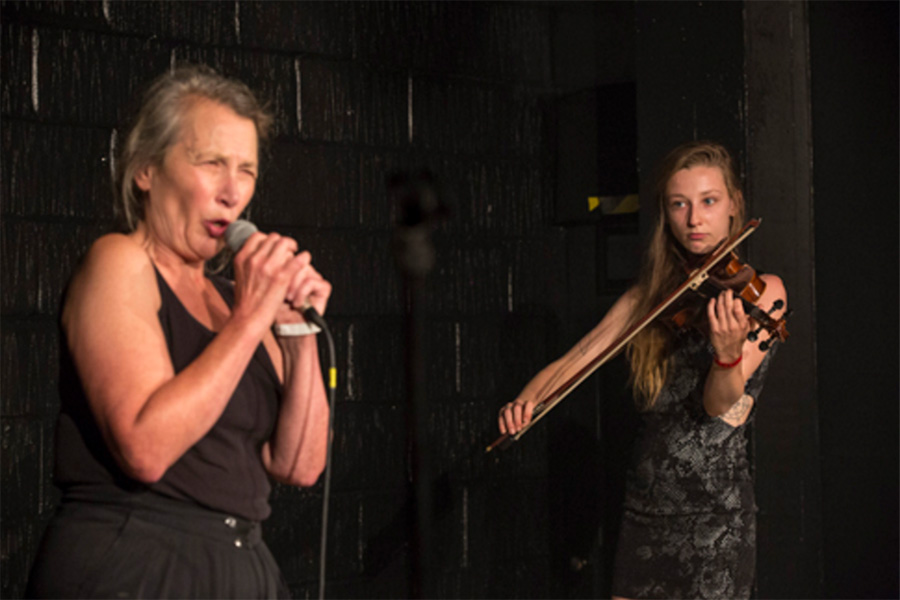
”Duets with Strangers” (2016)

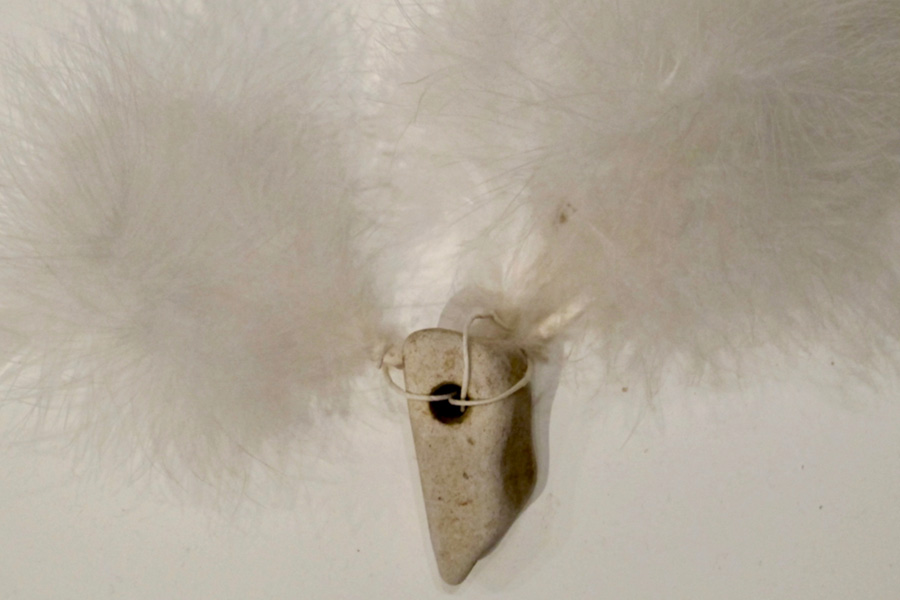
”museumMAN” (2017)

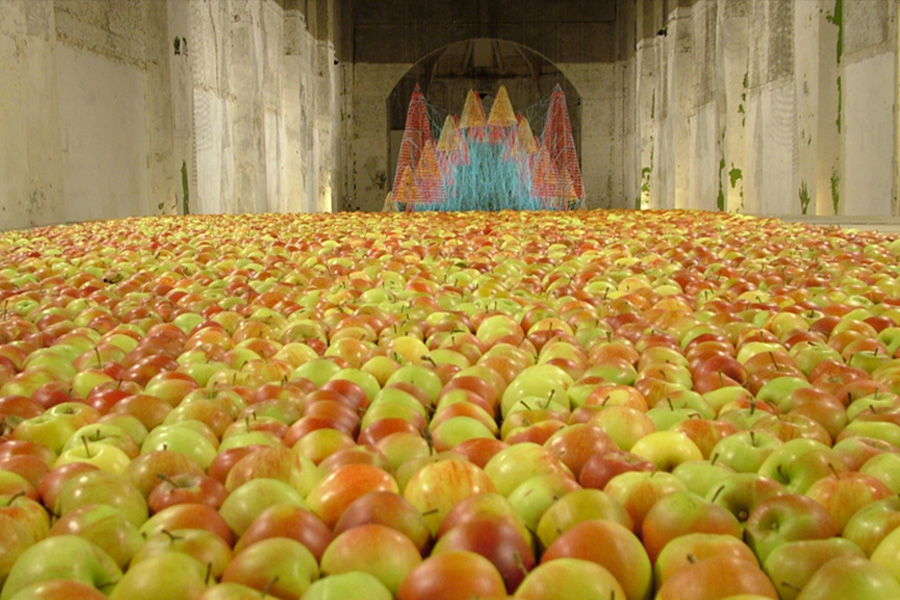
”REAP” (2005)

== Related publications ==
- Anne Bean: Autobituary by Guy Brett, Sally O'Reilly, Miria Swain (London: Matt's Gallery, 2006). ISBN 0-907623-51-4
- Anne Bean: Life Etc ed. by Rob La Frenais (Bristol and London: Live Art Development Agency and Intellect, 2018). ISBN 9781783209460
