= Yukimi =

Yukimi is a Japanese feminine given name. Notable people with the name include:

- Yukimi Nagano (born 1982), Swedish singer and songwriter
- Yukimi Moriyama (born 1996), Japanese swimmer
- Yukimi Matsuo (born 1987), Japanese actress and model
- Yukimi Hayase
