= Bow Gamelan Ensemble =

The Bow Gamelan Ensemble was a group of musicians in Bow, London, England, who used elements of gamelan music. Formed in 1983 by Richard Wilson with Paul Burwell and Anne Bean, the group disbanded in 1990. The ensemble created a theatrical experience, going beyond the normal definitions of music, and adapted their performances to the environment. They performed at Three Mills on the River Lea in the London Borough of Newham and many other novel venues.
