= The Kipper Kids =

British contemporary artists

- The Kipper Kids: von Haselberg (left) and Routh (right)
- Education: East 15 Acting School
- Occupation: Contemporary artists
- Years active: 1971–1982, 2003

The Kipper Kids were a duo composed of Martin Rochus Sebastian von Haselberg (born 20 January 1949) and Brian Routh (1948–2018), two artists known for the extreme and often comedic performance art they made together in the 1970s and after. Von Haselberg lives and works in New York, and Routh last lived in Leicester, England. From 1971, the duo were also known as Harry and Harry Kipper.

== Biography ==
While attending East 15 Acting School, Martin von Haselberg and Brian Routh invented a character they called Harry Kipper. Upon being expelled from the school on the claim of "too experimental", they began working as a touring act. They were originally called Harry and Alf Kipper and had two distinctly different characters. Later, they dropped the name Alf and decided to call each other Harry and make their characters identical.

From 1971 to 1975, most of their performances took place in Europe. In 1974, David Ross (later director of the Whitney Museum of Art and the San Francisco Museum of Modern Art) saw them in performance at Gallerie Rudolf Zwirner in Cologne and invited them to do some shows in California. The Kipper Kids moved to Los Angeles in 1975 and became associated with the early years of punk.

In 1982, they stopped actively collaborating. Their final performance together was at the National Review of Live Art, Glasgow, in 2003. They reunited as The Kipper Kids in 2018 to perform the song "Mah Nà Mah Nà" for the album Dr. Demento: Covered in Punk.

== Performance career ==
The two Harry Kippers, 8 October 1979, at Hallwalls in Buffalo, New York. Photo Ann Rosen

Quoting from an announcement for the Berkeley Art Museum: "Through actions that at times stress the visual, and the violent aspects of social rituals, the British Team of Harry and Harry Kipper perform in a fashion that combines the zany theatrics of Spike Milligan with a scatological slapstick that is all their own". Routh and von Haselberg created elaborate but purposely low-tech installations in which they would perform "ceremonies" using mostly found objects. Examples are "Tea Ceremony" (1972) a Japanese tea ceremony-inspired piece and "Boxing Ceremony" (1972) in which one performer beats himself until bloodied while the other acts as referee. Japanese rituals, English music hall, Viennese Actionism, and the work of Samuel Beckett were amongst their influences.

The Kipper Kids made two projects for television. For HBO they produced Mum's Magic Mulch, and for Cinemax, K.O. Kippers, while the Kids also appeared in a 1982 project for HBO executive-produced by von Haselberg, The Mondo Beyondo Show, a one time presentation for performance artists (including a pre-Stomp Yes/No People, La La La Human Steps, Bill Irwin, Paul Zaloom and others) hosted by Bette Midler's Mondo Beyondo character. Von Haselberg made a number of films at the American Film Institute with Routh in the lead role: Quiet Lives (1991), People Are No Damn Good (1991) and Your Turn To Roll It #54 (1992). They also were seen as characters in the 1982 film Forbidden Zone and the 1989 film UHF. Another television appearance came during the fifth season of ABC's Moonlighting. First aired on Valentine's Day, 1989, "I See England, I See France, I See Maddie's Netherworld" featured The Kipper Kids as a pair of gravediggers in a surreal dream sequence. The Kipper Kids also performed a song in the 1991 comedy film The Addams Family: "Playmates" which can be heard in the film and on its soundtrack.

Later, Martin von Haselberg created a series of large photographic images made into inflatable sculptural shapes titled Floatulents.

== Filmography ==
Year	Title
1991	The Addams Family
1990	Mum's Magic Mulch
1989	Moonlighting
1989	UHF
1988	Mondo Beyondo
1988	K.O. Kippers
1981	Theatre In Trance – Rainer Werner Fassbinder
1981	No Holds Barre
1982	Forbidden Zone
1979	Dress Rehearsal-Werner Schroeter
1977 & 1978	Chuck Barris Rah-Rah Show

== Personal lives ==
Von Haselberg has been married to Bette Midler since 1984. They have one daughter together, actress Sophie von Haselberg.

Routh was married three times: to net.art pioneer Nina Sobell from 1975 to 1981, to performance artist Karen Finley from 1981 to 1987, and to digital artist Patricia Wells.
