= Sardinia Street, Lincoln's Inn =

Sardinia street (formerly Duke street)

Coordinates: 51°30′54.85″N 0°7′6.12″W

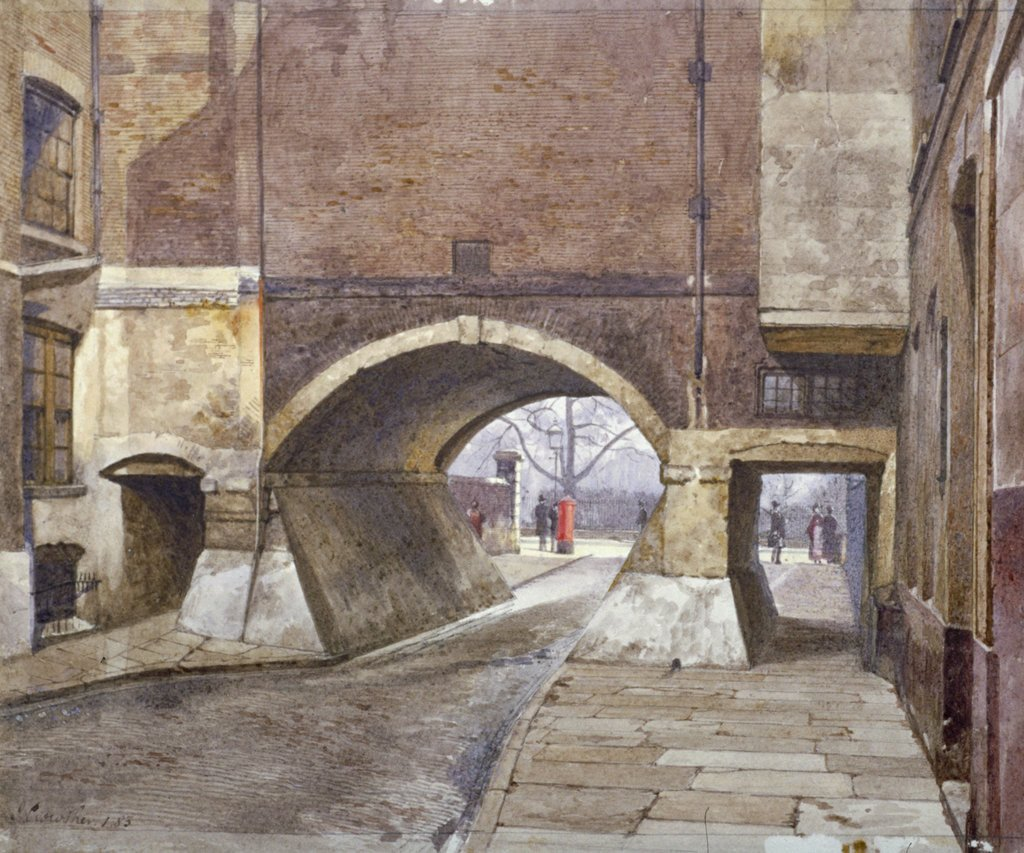
View of the entrance to Lincoln's Inn Fields in Duke Street by John Crowther, referring to this entrance, a side entrance.

Sardinia Street, formerly Duke Street, was the northern continuation of Kemble Street (formerly Princes Street). It ended, like its successor, on the west side (carriageway) of Lincoln's Inn Fields in the north, but further north. It was joined on its western side by King's Head Yard (demolished) and Wild Street (formerly Great Wild Street), and opposite by Vere Street (demolished). On the eastern side at the northern end was a Roman Catholic chapel and chapel yard.

== History ==
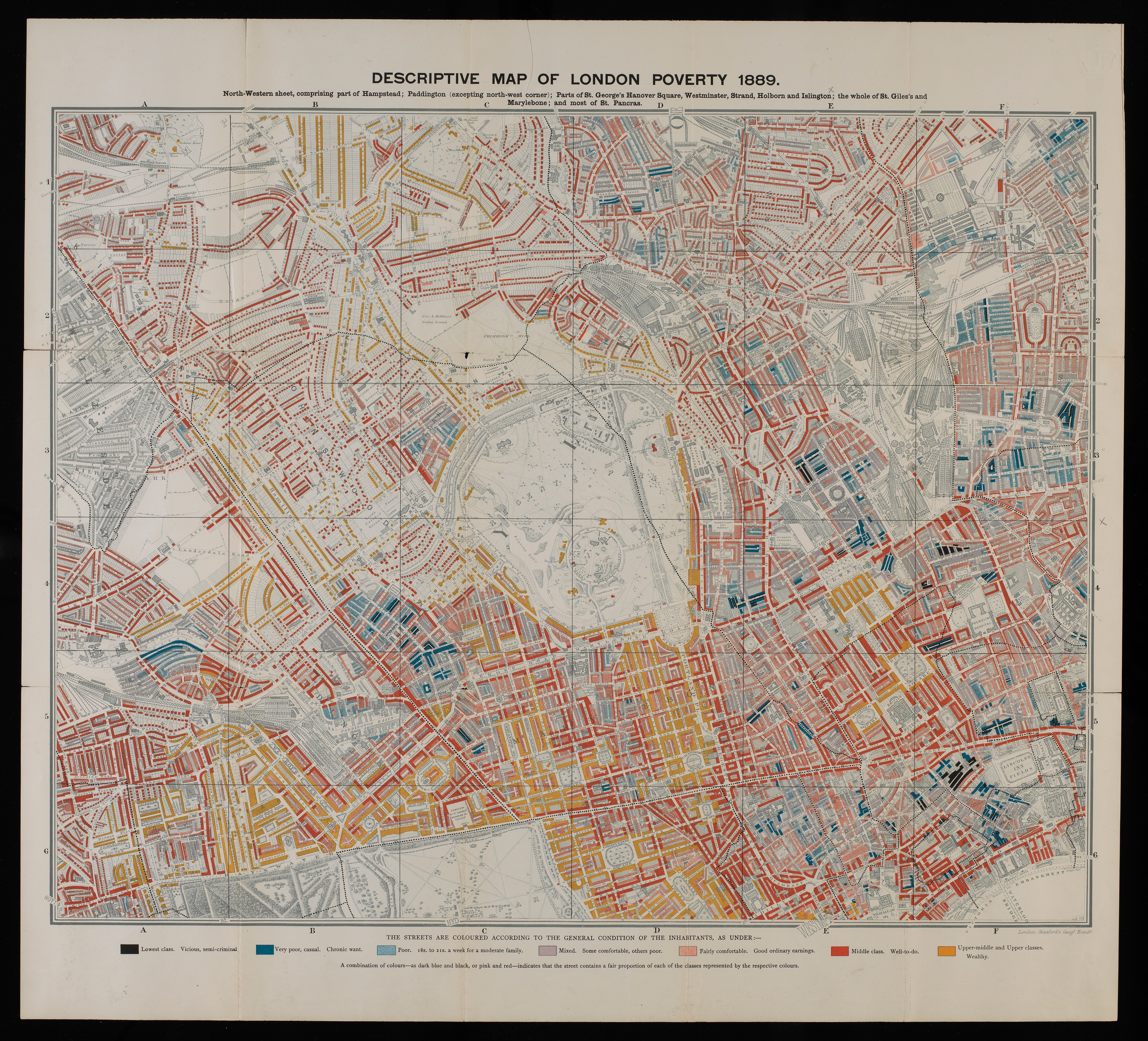
Street marked by north-south black dots.
Poor families in blue and darker; mixed in grey; richer in income or capital in pink, red and gold. In 1889. Click for broader map and to enable varied magnification.

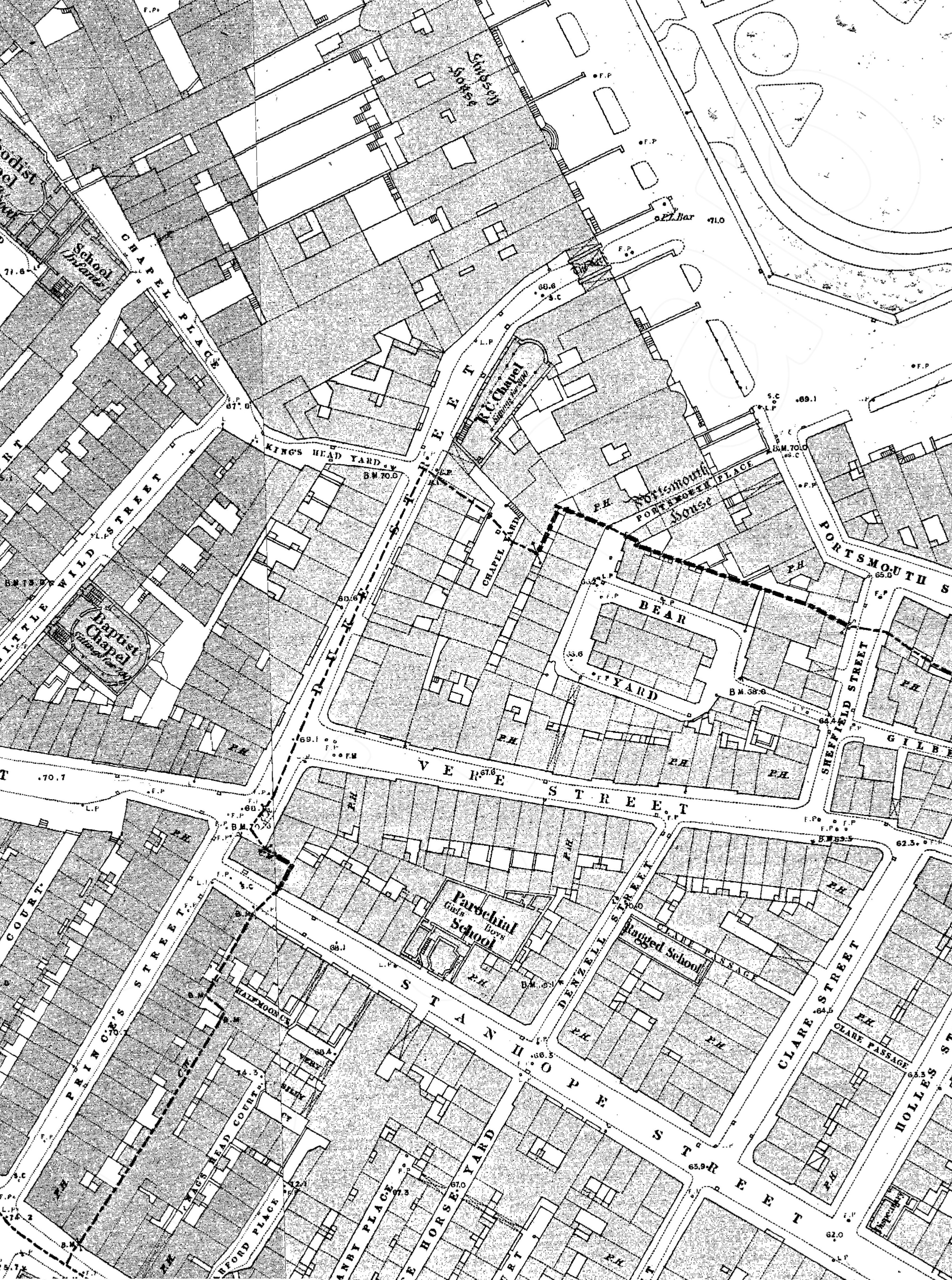
Sardinia Street on an 1870s Ordnance Survey map when it was still known as Duke Street.

Duke Street was built up from the mid-1600s. The land it is built on came into the ownership of Humphrey Weld in 1652 who built a house which he let in 1661 on a 21 years' lease. By 1658, Wenceslas Hollar's plan showed Duke Street fully built.

The street had a distinctive arch at its northern end for access to and from Lincoln's Inn Fields, the western side of the fields being called Arch Row for that reason. The house immediately south of the archway was the home of the Sardinian ambassador which held at first the only entrance to the Sardinian Chapel fronting Duke Street.

The street was renamed Sardinia Street during the late nineteenth century. What was its south-east continues to be in the (Anglican) ecclesiastical parish of St Mary le Strand (united with St Clement Danes); the rest the parish of St Paul Covent Garden.

The street was shortened and re-sited during the construction of Kingsway which was officially opened by King Edward VII in 1905. The arch at the northern end survived until later. The new Sardinia Street, much shorter than the original, was built further south and connects Kingsway to the south-west corner of Lincoln's Inn Fields.

== Gallery ==
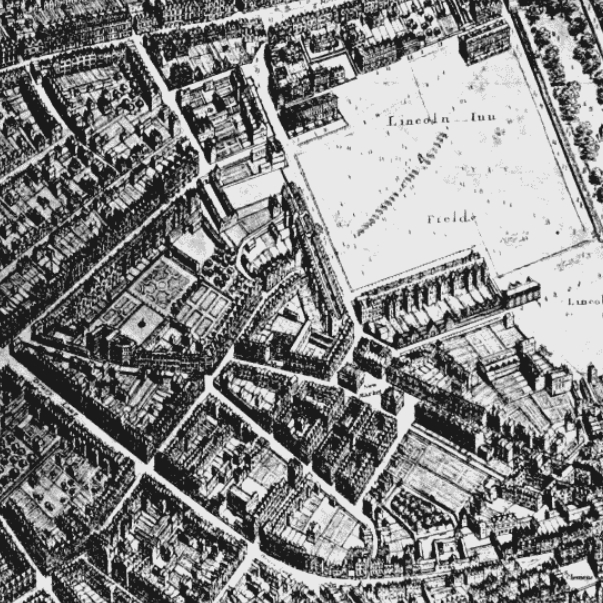
Extract from Hollar's map of c. 1658.

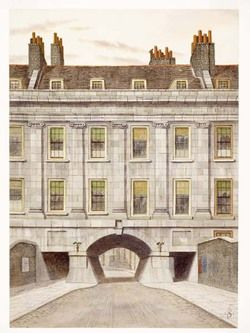
Entrance to Sardinia Street from Lincoln' Inn Fields by James Lawson Stewart c. 1890.
