= Amplifier (disambiguation) =

An (electronic) amplifier is a device for increasing the power of an electronic signal.

Amplifier may also refer to:

== Other amplifier types ==
- Audio power amplifier, a type of electronic amplifier
- Fluidic amplifier
- Mechanical amplifier
- Optical amplifier
- Pneumatic amplifier
- Torque amplifier

== Music ==
- Amplifier (band), an English rock band
  - Amplifier (Amplifier album), 2004
- Amplifier (Dance Exponents album), 1986
- "Amplifier", a song by Imran Khan, 2009
- "Amplifier", a song by the dB's from the 1982 album Repercussion
- "Amplifier", a song by Manafest from the 2017 album Stones

== See also ==
- Amplification (disambiguation)
