= Amplification =

Amplification or Amplified or Amplify may refer to:

== Science and technology ==
- Amplification, the operation of an amplifier, a natural or artificial device intended to make a signal stronger
- Amplification (molecular biology), a mechanism leading to multiple copies of a chromosomal region within a chromosome arm
- Amplify Tablet, Android-based tablet
- Polar amplification, the phenomenon describing how the Arctic is warming faster than any other region in response to global warming
- Polymerase chain reaction (PCR), a molecular biology laboratory method for creating multiple copies of small segments of DNA
- Twitter Amplify, a video advertising product that Twitter launched for media companies and consumer brands
- Amplification of the ground acceleration during an earthquake which is called seismic site effects

== Music ==
- Instrument amplifier, the use of amplifiers in music
- Amplified (band), a Hong Kong rock band
- Amplified (Q-Tip album)
- Amplified (Mock Orange album)
- Amplified // A Decade of Reinventing the Cello, by Apocalyptica

== Other uses ==
- Amplification (rhetoric), a figure of speech that adds importance to increase its rhetorical effect
- Amplification (psychology), in which physical symptoms are affected by a psychological state
- Amplify (company), a digital education company launched in 2012
- Amplify (distributor), American independent film distributor
- Amplify Dot, rapper and broadcaster from London, England
- Amplified Bible (AMP), English translation of the Bible produced jointly by Zondervan and The Lockman Foundation
- Intelligence amplification, the use of information technology in augmenting human intelligence.

== See also ==
- Amplifier (disambiguation)
- Amp (disambiguation)
- Magnification
