= The Sick Rose =

Poem by William Blake

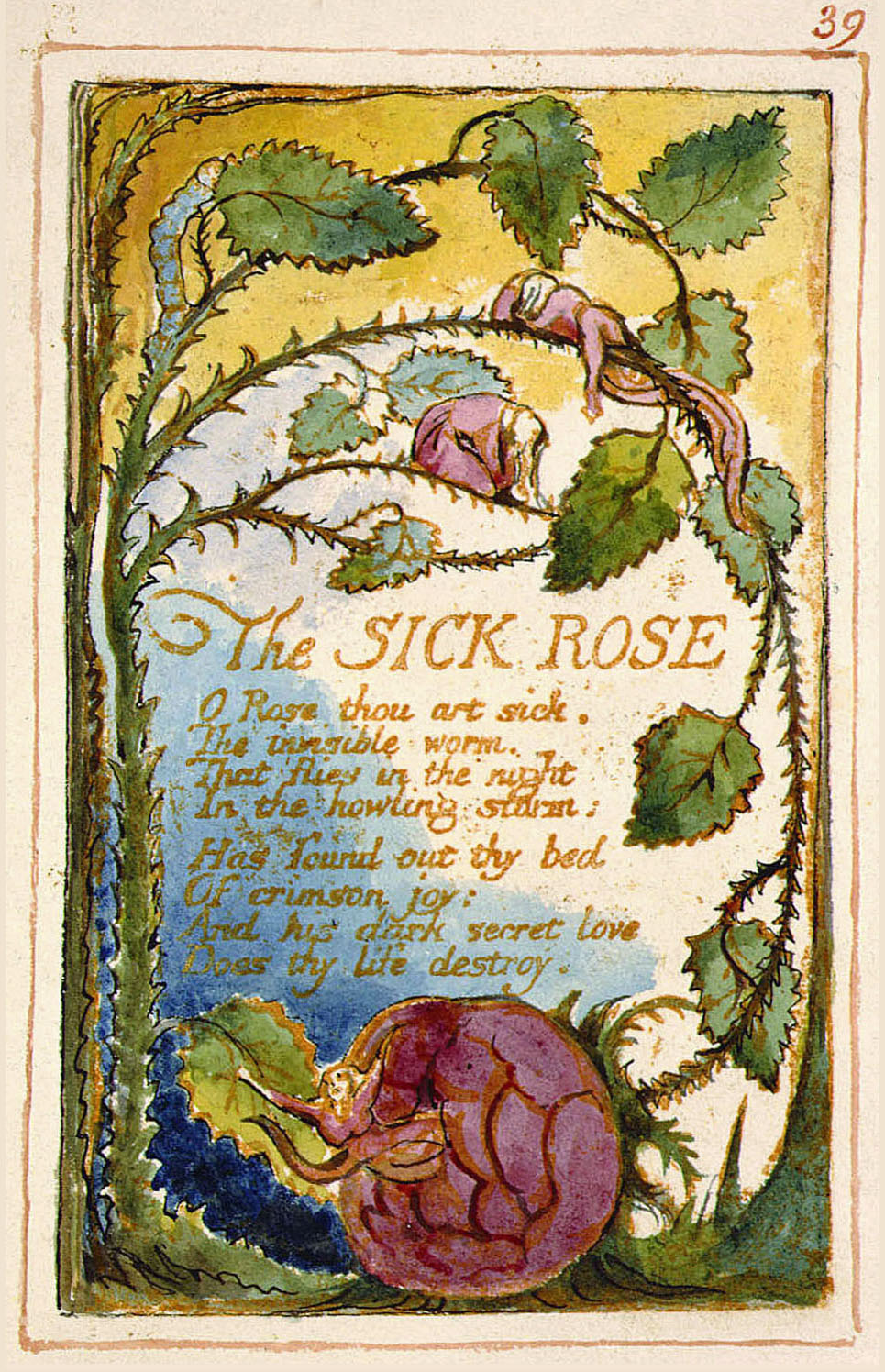
Hand-coloured print, issued c.1826. A copy held by the Fitzwilliam Museum, Cambridge

"The Sick Rose" is a poem by William Blake, originally published in Songs of Innocence and of Experience as the 39th plate; the incipit of the poem is O Rose thou art sick. Blake composed the poem sometime after 1789, and presented it with an illuminated border and illustration, typical of his self-publications. Since the 20th century, the poem has been the subject of scrutiny by scholars for its oblique and enigmatic meaning, and bizarre, suggestive imagery.

== Text ==
O Rose thou art sick.
The invisible worm,
That flies in the night
In the howling storm:

Has found out thy bed
Of crimson joy:
And his dark secret love
Does thy life destroy.

== Analysis ==
Nathan Cervo describes the poem as "one of the most baffling and enigmatic in the English language". The rose and worm in the poem have been seen as "figures of humanity", although Michael Riffaterre doubts the direct equivalence of Man as a worm; when Blake makes this comparison in other places, Riffaterre notes, he is explicit about it. Nevertheless, the "lesson of the worm may be applicable to human experience".

The rhyme scheme is ABCB. The scansion is difficult to place, due to a lack of pattern; the stanzas are asymmetrical: the first has syllables of 5,6,5,5, and the second of 5,4,6,5. Punctuation is also irregular: there is no comma after "O Rose", and yet there is a comma [,] after "worm".

The differences between the text and the design (in its several versions) have been studied. Not only is the sky in the print clear rather than stormy, but the rose with the worm appears as the most vigorous out of the three roses figured, and her stem seems to bend to earth to welcome the phallic invader. Some critics have read into this a deliberate irony on the part of the poet that distances him from the speaker, and it has been suggested that it is the two sister roses speaking in the poem. This would account for the differences in weather and time of day: it seems like night because they hide their eyes. In this reading, the poem registers their jealousy and moralism regarding their sister's sexual fulfillment.

Kathleen Raine, in her investigation of the influence of Neoplatonism and Hermeticism on Blake, proposed that the poem engages with the tale of Cupid and Psyche from The Golden Ass, a favorite work of Blake's.

A draft of the poem gives the worm the pronoun "her". If Blake's worm is taken as related to the succubus or incubus, the sex of the worm would simply be the opposite of the sex of the Rose. The word "worm" has historical connections with these myths, as having, as early as the ninth century, figuratively referred to a gnawing idea. Related words have philological ties, like the word "larva", which in Latin means "ghost". Blake regarded the sexually repressive aspects of Pauline Christianity as unhealthy, and the worm has been read as representing the prurient thoughts of the repressed male, and the rose the object of his fantasy. Paracelsus, one of the most powerful influences on Blake's thinking, writes about a phenomenon where a false sperm created from sexual fantasy is carried off by incubi and succubi and "hatched into serpents, worms [vermes], toads and other impure creatures".

== In music ==
The poem was set to music by Benjamin Britten in his 1943 Serenade for Tenor, Horn and Strings, where it forms the movement "Elegy". British band Amplifier set the poem to music on their 2011 album The Octopus. Verses of the poem also comprised and inspired the 1991 song "Love's Secret Domain" by English group Coil.
