= Arkansas Early Learning =

U.S. nonprofit organization

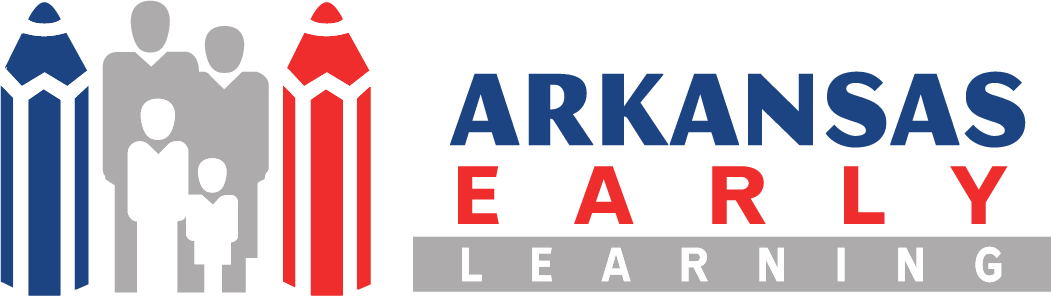
- Arkansas Early Learning logo
- Formation: 2010
- Founder: Michael Patterson & Nelson Walter
- Founded at: Rogers, Arkansas
- Legal status: 501(c)(3) Nonprofit Corporation
- Headquarters: Jonesboro, Arkansas
- Region served: United States
- Services: Head Start and Early Head Start
- CEO/CIO: Nelson Walter/Michael Patterson
- Main organ: Board of Directors
- Budget: $20,100,000
- Staff: 300+
- Volunteers: 1500+
- Website: www.arearlylearning.org

Arkansas Early Learning, Inc., headquartered in Jonesboro, Arkansas, is a nonprofit organization as classified under Internal Revenue Code 501(c)(3) that provides federal and community funded Head Start and Early Head Start services to almost 1,200 families throughout Arkansas annually. Arkansas Early Learning is classified as a public charitable organization (PC) under IRS and Arkansas classifications. The company's main areas of focus are early childhood education, health, mental health, disabilities, family engagement, and nutrition.

== History ==
Arkansas Early Learning was founded in Rogers, Arkansas on December 10, 2010, by Michael Patterson and Nelson Walter as a sole proprietorship. The two founders incorporated in Arkansas on May 16, 2011, and received IRS 501(c)(3) Public Charity designation status on December 5, 2011. Arkansas Early Learning receives three federal grants annually.

The company was awarded its first federal Head Start grant on June 1, 2013. This grant established Head Start services in six Northeast Arkansas Counties: Craighead, Crittenden, Cross, Green, Jackson, and Poinsett. On July 1, 2014, the company was awarded a second grant. This Early Head Start grant established services in two Central Arkansas Counties: Garland and Pulaski.

A third grant was awarded on May 1, 2015, establishing new Early Head Start services in Northwest Arkansas, Benton County, and Central Arkansas, Saline County. This grant also expanded services in two Northeast Arkansas Counties: Cross and Crittenden. The third grant was part of the Early Head Start - Child Care Partnership initiative.

A fourth grant was awarded on March 1, 2019, establishing additional Early Head Start services in Northwest Arkansas, Benton County, and adding Washington County Arkansas. This grant was part of the third round of funding of the Early Head Start - Child Care Partnership initiative.
