= Project STAR =

Project STAR (Steps to Achieving Resilience) was three-year, federally funded research project which consisted of an intervention with preschoolers enrolled in the Head Start program in Lane County, Oregon, United States. The project was conducted from 1999 to 2003 by the Early Childhood Research Unit of the University of Oregon College of Education. The principal investigators were Dr. Ruth Kaminski, one of the co-authors of the DIBELS early literacy assessment, and Beth Stormshak. The goal of the program was to increase literacy skills of at-risk children by improving their learning environments by increasing the number of planned and focused activities. The curriculum had two components: a classroom ecology component and family-focused intervention activities. The intervention was focused on strengthening children's skills in social ability. In order to help children they increased parenting and family participation in school by working directly with the parents of the students.

== Classroom ecology ==
The classroom ecology component is designed to help teachers develop the classroom environment in ways that promote the development of important literacy skills in children. The teachers were trained to focus on the overall environment in the classroom focusing on the physical environment (e.g., space and materials), the planning and scheduling of teacher activities and the structuring of a daily schedule, and improving the social environment by teaching social roles and expectations, monitoring students social interactions, and interacting with students regularly. One of the most important parts of the classroom ecology component were the Circle Time Activities which were instructional periods led by the teacher that focused on either sharing or vocabulary that lasted about 10 minutes each. Teachers were instructed to review skills learned previously, integrate new and old knowledge, and practice specific skills.

Another important component of classroom ecology was the Activity-Based Intervention (ABI) that provided an opportunity for children to learn critical skills through play and routine activities that are developmentally-appropriate and interesting to preschoolers. ABI's used here were related to skills learned during Circle Time Activities.

== Family-focused intervention ==
The family-focused intervention encouraged parents to instigate non-directive play with their preschoolers and responsive communication. They were also encouraged to attend to their child's emotions and actively discipline their children. Parents were provided with the skills used in the classroom component each week and instructed to give their children opportunities at home to practice skills learned in the classroom. The intervention also included a STAR Home Visiting curriculum where the initial focus was on parent-child joint storybook reading and the development of language skills. As the child progressed through preschool the focus shifted to phonological awareness skills and knowledge of the alphabet.
