= Magnification (disambiguation) =

Magnification is the enlargement of an image.

Magnification may also refer to:

- Exaggeration
- Magnification (album), a 2001 album by the rock band Yes
- Voltage magnification, of a series resonant circuit
- Current magnification, of a parallel resonant circuit
- Biomagnification, an increase in concentration of a substance as a food chain is climbed

== See also ==
- Amplification
- Magnify (album), a 2022 album by rock band Ham Sandwich
