= Insider (album) =

Studio album by Amplifier
- Released: 29 September 2006
- Recorded: The Works
- Genre: Alternative rock New prog
- Length: 59:03
- Label: SPV
- Producer: Sel Belamir

Amplifier chronology
The Astronaut Dismantles HAL (2005)	Insider (2006)	Eternity (2009)

Professional ratings
Review scores
Source	Rating
Kerrang!	5/5 stars
Rock Sound	8/10 stars

Insider is the second album of the Manchester alternative rock band Amplifier. It was released in 2006 by the German-based label SPV on 29 September in Germany and Austria then in the rest of Europe on 2 October.

== Track listing ==
All songs by Sel Balamir

1. "Gustav's Arrival" - 3:34
2. "O Fortuna" - 6:22
3. "Insider" - 4:30
4. "Mongrel's Anthem" - 4:26
5. "R.I.P" - 3:35
6. "Strange Seas of Thought" - 6:03
7. "Procedures" - 5:15
8. "Elysian Gold" - 4:50
9. "Oort" - 1:31
10. "What Is Music?" - 6:05
11. "Hymn of the Aten" - 5:48
12. "Map of an Imaginary Place" - 6:59

== Credits ==
- Sel Balamir – Guitar, vocals and production
- Neil Mahony – Bass / Typewriter
- Matt Brobin – Drums
- Steve Lyon - Recording
- Chris Sheldon – Mixing
- Kevin Metcaffe - Mastering
