= Mechanical amplifier =

A mechanical amplifier or a mechanical amplifying element is a linkage mechanism that amplifies the magnitude of mechanical quantities such as force, displacement, velocity, acceleration and torque in linear and rotational systems. In some applications, mechanical amplification induced by nature or unintentional oversights in man-made designs can be disastrous, causing situations such as the 1940 Tacoma Narrows Bridge collapse. When employed appropriately, it can help to magnify small mechanical signals for practical applications.

No additional energy can be created from any given mechanical amplifier due to conservation of energy. Claims of using mechanical amplifiers for perpetual motion machines are false, due to either a lack of understanding of the working mechanism or a simple hoax.

== Generic mechanical amplifiers ==
Amplifiers, in the most general sense, are intermediate elements that increase the magnitude of a signal. These include mechanical amplifiers, electrical/electronic amplifiers, hydraulic/fluidic amplifiers, pneumatic amplifiers, optical amplifiers and quantum amplifiers. The purpose of employing a mechanical amplifier is generally to magnify the mechanical signal fed into a given transducer such as gear trains in generators or to enhance the mechanical signal output from a given transducer such as diaphragm in speakers and gramophones.

Electrical amplifiers increase the power of the signal with energy supplied from an external source. This is generally not the case with most devices described as mechanical amplifiers; all the energy is provided by the original signal and there is no power amplification. For instance a lever can amplify the displacement of a signal, but the force is proportionately reduced. Such devices are more correctly described as transformers, at least in the context of mechanical–electrical analogies.

Transducers are devices that convert energy from one form to another, such as mechanical-to-electrical or vice versa; and mechanical amplifiers are employed to improve the efficiency of this energy conversion from mechanical sources. Mechanical amplifiers can be broadly classified as resonating/oscillating amplifiers (such as diaphragms) or non-resonating/oscillating amplifiers (such as gear trains).

== Resonating amplifiers ==
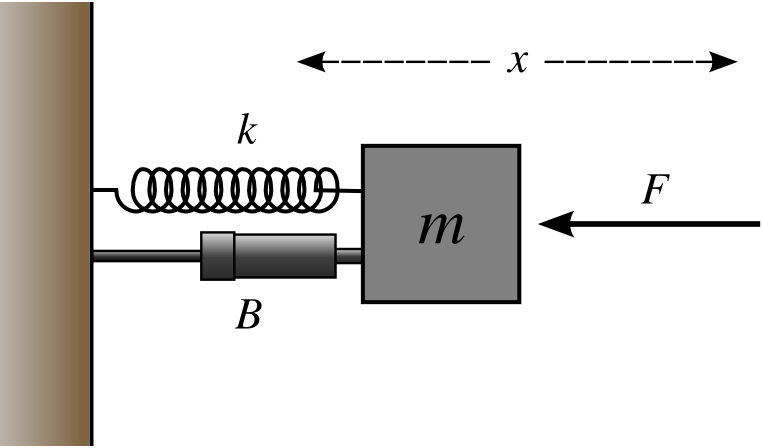
A generic model of a second order mass-spring damper system.

Any mechanical body that is not infinitely rigid (infinite damping) can exhibit vibration upon experiencing an external forcing. Most vibrating elements can be represented by a second order mass-spring-damper system governed by the following second order differential equation.

$$m\ddot{x} + c\dot{x} + kx = F(t)$$

where, x is the displacement, m is the effective mass, c is the damping coefficient, k is the spring constant of the restoring force, and F(t) is external forcing as a function of time.

"A mechanical amplifier is basically a mechanical resonator that resonates at the operating frequency and magnifies the amplitude of the vibration of the transducer at anti-node location."

Resonance is the physical phenomenon where the amplitude of oscillation (output) exhibit a buildup over time when the frequency of the external forcing (input) is in the vicinity of a resonant frequency. The output thus achieved is generally larger than the input in terms of displacement, velocity or acceleration. Although resonant frequency is generally used synonymously with natural frequency, there is in fact a distinction. While resonance can be achieved at the natural frequency, it can also be achieved at several other modes such as flexural modes. Therefore, the term resonant frequency encompasses all frequency bandwidths where some forms of resonance can be achieved; and this includes the natural frequency.

=== Direct resonators ===
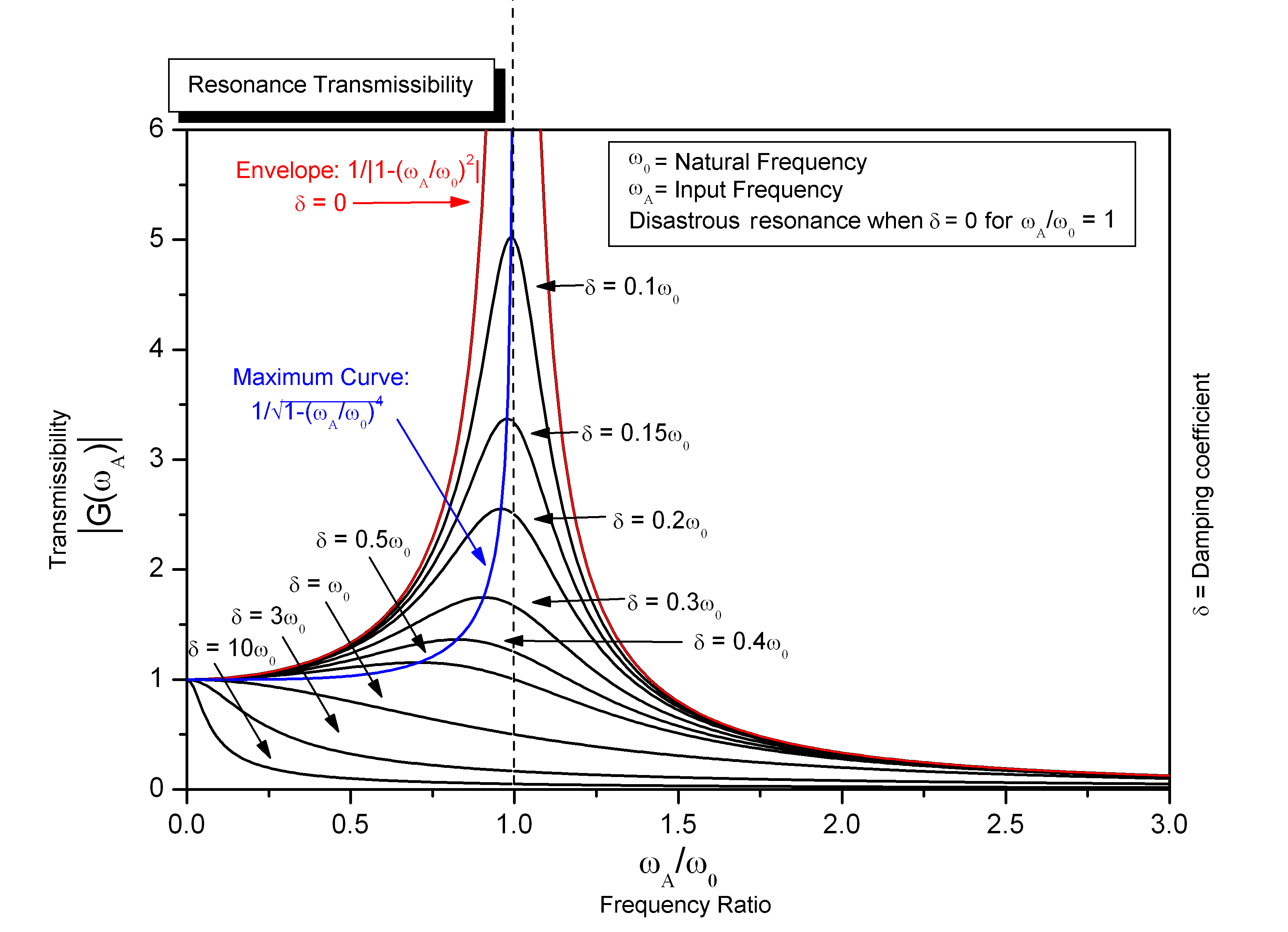
Fundamental mode of resonance for a mechanical oscillatory system at varying damping conditions.

All mechanical vibrating systems possess a natural frequency f_{n}, which is presented as the following in its most basic form.

$$f_n = {1\over 2 \pi} \sqrt {k\over m}$$

When an external forcing is applied directly (parallel to the plane of the oscillatory displacement) to the system around the frequency of its natural frequency, then the fundamental mode of resonance can be achieved. The oscillatory amplitude outside this frequency region is typically smaller than the resonant peak and the input amplitude. The amplitude of the resonant peak and the bandwidth of resonance is dependent on the damping conditions and is quantified by the dimensionless quantity Q factor. Higher resonant modes and resonant modes at different planes (transverse, lateral, rotational and flexural) are usually triggered at higher frequencies. The specific frequency vicinity of these modes depends on the nature and boundary conditions of each mechanical system. Additionally, subharmonics, superharmonics or subsuperharmonics of each mode can also be excited at the right boundary conditions.

“As a model for a detector we note that if you hang a weight on a spring and then move the upper end of the spring up and down, the amplitude of the weight will be much larger than the driving amplitude if you are at the resonant frequency of the mass and spring assembly. It is essentially a mechanical amplifier and serves as a good candidate for a sensitive detector."

=== Parametric resonators ===
Parametric resonance is the physical phenomenon where an external excitation, at a specific frequency and typically orthogonal to the plane of displacement, introduces a periodic modulation in one of the system parameters resulting in a buildup in oscillatory amplitude. It is governed by the Mathieu equation. The following is a damped Mathieu equation.

$$\ddot{x} + c\dot{x} + [\delta - 2 \varepsilon \cos{2t}]x = 0$$

where δ is the squared of the natural frequency and ε is the amplitude of the parametric excitation.

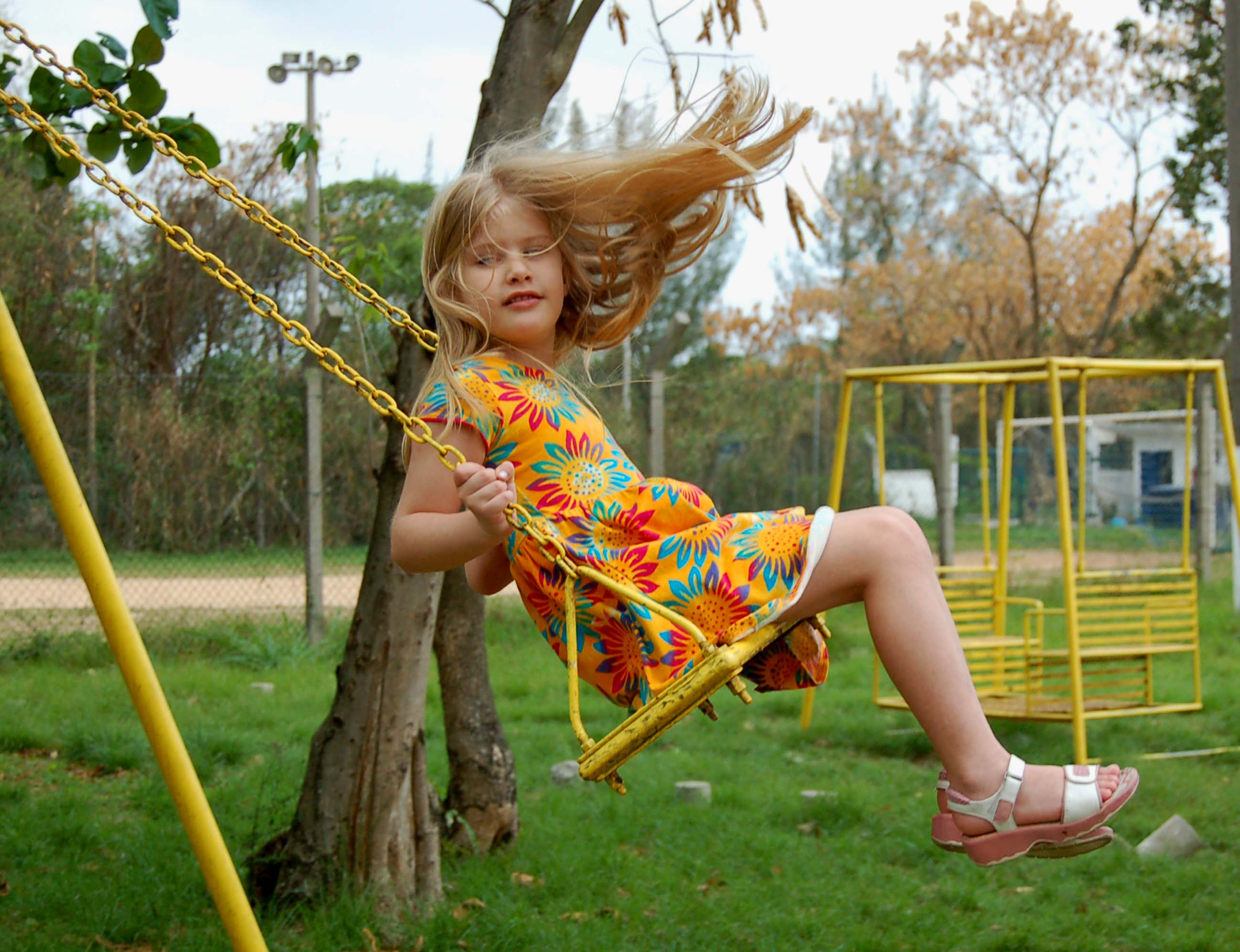
Swing is essentially a pendulum, which can be driven into either direct or parametric resonance depending on the nature of excitation and boundary conditions.

The first order or the principal parametric resonance is achieved when the driving/excitation frequency is twice the natural frequency of a given system. Higher orders of parametric resonance are observed either at or at submultiples of the natural frequency. For direct resonance, the response frequency always matches the excitation frequency. However, regardless of which order of parametric resonance is activated, the response frequency of parametric resonance is always in the vicinity of the natural frequency. Parametric resonance has the ability to exhibit higher mechanical amplification than direct resonance when operating at favourable conditions, but usually has a longer build up/transient state.

“The parametric resonator provides a very useful instrument that has been developed by a number of researchers, in part because a parametric resonator can serve as a mechanical amplifier, over a narrow band of frequencies.”

==== Swing analogy ====
Direct resonance can be equated to someone pushing a child on a swing. If the frequency of the pushing (external forcing) matches the natural frequency of the child-swing system, direct resonance can be achieved. Parametric resonance, on the other hand, is the child shifting his/her own weight with time (twice the frequency of the natural frequency) and building up the oscillatory amplitude of the swing without anyone helping to push. In other words, there is an internal transfer of energy (instead of simply dissipating all available energy) as the system parameter (child's weight) modulates and changes with time.

=== Other resonators/oscillators ===
Other means of signal enhancement, applicable to both mechanical and electrical domains, exist. These include chaos theory, stochastic resonance and many other nonlinear or vibrational phenomena. No new energy is created. However, through mechanical amplification, more of the available power spectrum can be utilised at a more optimal efficiency rather than dissipated.

== Non-resonating amplifiers ==
Levers and gear trains are classical tools used to achieve mechanical advantage MA, which is a measure of mechanical amplification.

=== Lever ===
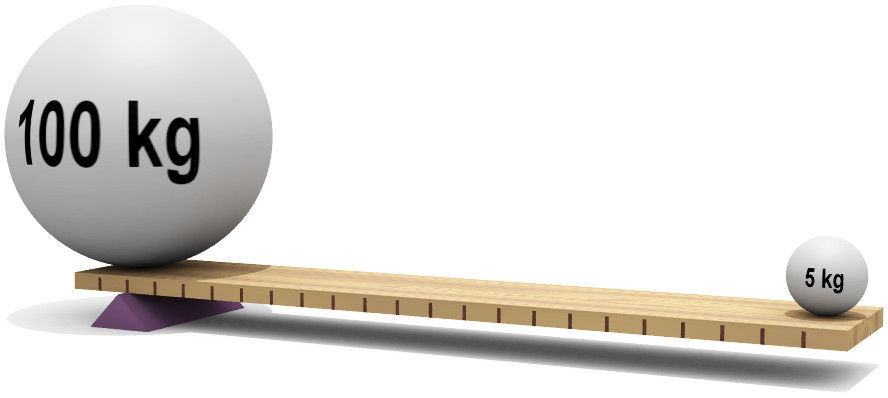
A lever can amplify either displacement or force.

Lever can be used to change the magnitude of a given mechanical signal, such as force or displacement. Levers are widely used as mechanical amplifiers in actuators and generators.

It is a mechanism that usually consist of a rigid beam/rod fixed about a pivot. Levers are balanced when there is a balance of moment or torque about the pivot. Three major classifications exist, depending on the position of the pivot, input and output forces. The fundamental principle of lever mechanism is governed by the following ratio, dating back to Archimedes.

$$\frac{F_B}{F_A} = \frac{a}{b}$$

where F_{A} is a force acting on point A on the rigid lever beam, F_{B} is a force acting on point B on the rigid lever beam and a and b are the respective distances from points A and B to the pivot point.

If F_{B} is the output force and F_{A} is the input force, then mechanical advantage MA is given by the ratio of output force to input force.

$$MA = \frac{F_B}{F_A}$$

=== Gear train ===
Two meshing gears transmit rotational motion. With different number of teeth between the input and output gears, torque and velocity can be either amplified or reduced.

Gear trains are usually formed by the meshing engagement of two or more gears on a frame to form a transmission. This can provide translation (linear motion) or rotation as well as mechanically alter displacement, speed, velocity, acceleration, direction and torque depending on the type of gears employed, transmission configuration and gearing ratio.

The mechanical advantage of a gear train is given by the ratio of the output torque T_{B} and input torque T_{A}, which is also the same ratio of number of teeth of the output gear N_{B} and the number of teeth of the input gear N_{A}.

$$MA = \frac{T_B}{T_A} = \frac{N_B}{N_A}.$$

Therefore, torque can be amplified if the number of teeth of the output gear is larger than that of the input gear.

The ratio of the number of gear teeth is also related to the gear velocities ω_{A} and ω_{B} as follows.

$$\frac{T_A}{T_B} = \frac{\omega_B}{\omega_A}.$$

Therefore, if the number of teeth of the output gear is less than that of the input, the output velocity is amplified.

=== Others ===
The above-mentioned mechanical quantities can also be amplified and/or converted either through a combination of above or other iterations of mechanical transmission systems, such as, cranks, cam, torque amplifiers, hydraulic jacks, mechanical comparator such as Johansson Mikrokator and many more.

== See also ==
- Amplifier (disambiguation)
- Mechanical advantage device
- Resonator
