= The Astronaut Dismantles HAL =

Album by Amplifier

EP by Amplifier
- Released: 24 October 2005
- Genre: Space rock, progressive rock
- Length: 38:21 (35:25 excl. gap in final track)
- Label: SPV

Amplifier chronology
Amplifier (2004)	The Astronaut Dismantles HAL (2005)	Insider (2006)

Professional ratings
Review scores
Source	Rating
Kerrang!	3/5 stars

The Astronaut Dismantles HAL is an EP by Amplifier. The title references the film 2001: A Space Odyssey, in which astronaut David Bowman disables homicidal computer HAL.

== Track listing ==
1. "Continuum" – 8:50
2. "Into the Space Age" – 4:58
3. "For Marcia" – 4:57
4. "The Brain Room" – 0:56
5. "Everyday Combat" – 5:32
6. "Live Human" – 14:28
  - (plus hidden track 'Scarecrows')
