= Amplifier (Amplifier album) =

Studio album by Amplifier
- Released: 6 June 2004
- Recorded: The Chapel / The Works
- Genre: Progressive rock, alternative rock, space rock, progressive metal
- Length: 63:05
- Label: Music For Nations
- Producer: Sel Balamir / Steve Lyon

Amplifier chronology
Amplifier (2004)	The Astronaut Dismantles HAL (2005)

Professional ratings
Review scores
Source	Rating
The Fly	5/5 stars
Kerrang!	5/5 stars
Metal Hammer	(9/10)
NME	(9/10)
Q	4/5 stars
Rock Sound	(9/10)

Amplifier is the debut album of the Manchester alternative rock band Amplifier.

Originally released by Music For Nations on 6 June 2004, it was re-released by the German-based label SPV in May 2005 after the collapse of the former. The Music For Nations release came in two formats: jewel case with 10 tracks, and digipack with 13 tracks. Unlike normal special editions, the 13-track version's bonus tracks are in the middle of the album, apparently forming the "true" album as the band intended it. The SPV release contains a bonus EP with four additional tracks (all previously released) and videos of two songs from the original.

The critical reception of the album was generally positive, with comments such as:

"A British rock-scene altering record. Enjoy it in all its infinite glory" Kerrang!

"No other record this year will have the audacity to field such lofty ambitions, let alone have the skills to fulfil them" NME

== Track listing ==
All songs by Sel Balamir.

Music for Nations - Original Release

1. "Motorhead" – 6:15
2. "Airborne" – 8:28
3. "Panzer" – 7:02
4. "Old Movies" – 5:50
5. "Post Acid Youth" – 6:05
6. "Half Life" – 3:47
7. "Drawing No1" - 2:09
8. "Neon" – 4:16
9. "On/Off" – 6:33
10. "The Consultancy" – 4:59
11. "Drawing No2" - 2:49
12. "One Great Summer" – 5:56
13. "UFOs" – 7:26

SPV - 2CD Re-release

1. "Motorhead" – 6:15
2. "Airborne" – 8:28
3. "Panzer" – 7:02
4. "Old Movies" – 5:50
5. "Post Acid Youth" – 6:05
6. "Neon" – 4:16
7. "On/Off" – 6:33
8. "The Consultancy" – 4:59
9. "One Great Summer" – 5:56
10. "UFOs" – 7:26

Bonus EP Tracks

1. "Boomtime" – 4:51
2. "Half Life" – 3:47
3. "Throwaway" – 2:29
4. "Glory Electricity" – 7:36

== Credits ==
- Sel Balamir – Guitar, vocals and co-production
- Neil Mahony – Bass
- Matt Brobin – Drums
- Matt Steele – Electric Piano on "Old Movies" and reverse piano on "On/Off"
- Claire Lemmon – Backing vocals on "Neon"
- Mike Vennart and Steve Durose – Backing vocals on "Panzer" and "UFOs"
- Steve Lyon– Co-production
- Chris Sheldon – Mixing
- Max Dingle – Assistant mixing
- Chris Blair – Mastering
- Rainer Holst – Mastering of bonus EP
