= Southwest Human Development =

American nonprofit organization

- Southwest Human Development
- Formation: 1981
- Founder: Ginger Ward
- Type: Non-profit
- Purpose: Provide early childhood development services for young children
- Headquarters: Phoenix, Arizona
- Region served: Southwest United States
- Key people: Ginger Ward, Jake Adams, Trudi Murch, Suzanne M. Schunk, Mindy Zapata, William McClung, Janet Otte, Annette Findlay, Alan Taylor
- Affiliations: Easter Seals
- Budget: $72M annually
- Staff: 900
- Website: www.swhd.org

Southwest Human Development is an American nonprofit organization that provides child development services. It is located in Phoenix, Arizona, and is the second largest nonprofit organization in the city. The organization focuses on mental health, child literacy, early childhood education, disability services and child welfare.

== History ==
Southwest Human Development was founded in 1981 with six staff members, a small budget of $150,000 and a single support program, serving 175 families. By 1988, the organization had grown to 120 staff members and a budget of $3.5 million. By 1993 it grew to about 230 staff members with a budget of $6.7 million, and by 1996 that had grown to 300 staff members with a budget of $13 million, serving 12,000 families. In 2003, the organization obtained and renovated a 50,000 square foot facility in Phoenix, which is currently used at its headquarters. By 2004, the organization had grown to 450 staff members, with a budget of $23 million, serving 50,000 families. By 2006, more than 40 development and outreach programs had been initiated. In 2007, Southwest Human Development became an affiliate of Easter Seals. In 2010, the organization had grown to 650 staff members, with over 100 programs. Currently, the organization has grown to a staff of over 900, with a budget of $72 million, serving 135,000 families annually.

== See also ==
- Easter Seals (US)
- Reach Out and Read
- Head Start Program
- Nurse-Family Partnership
