= Eternity (Amplifier EP) =

EP by Amplifier
- Released: 2008
- Genre: Space rock, progressive rock
- Length: 35:47
- Label: self-released

Amplifier chronology
| Insider (2006) | Eternity (2008) | The Octopus (2011) |

Eternity is an EP by Amplifier, released in 2008. The EP is made up of previously unreleased songs recorded between 1998 and 2003.

== Track listing ==
1. "Amplified 99" – 4:46
2. "Area 51" – 5:44
3. "The Ways of Amplifier" – 6:47
4. "My Corrosion" – 5:49
5. "Departure Lounge" – 6:36
6. "Number One Son" – 6:05
