= Mystoria =

British rock album

Studio album by Amplifier
- Released: 2014
- Recorded: April 2014
- Studios: Monnow Valley Studios, Wales
- Genres: Progressive rock, alternative rock
- Length: 45:23
- Label: Superball Music

Amplifier chronology
Echo Street (2013)	Mystoria (2014)	Trippin' with Dr. Faustus (2017)

Mystoria is the fifth studio album by the English rock band Amplifier, released in 2014 by Superball Music.

== Reception ==
Prog called Mystoria "one of the landmark progressive rock releases of this young century", followed by Classic Rock's remark "a triumph of first-rate tunes and satisfying progressive rock".

Norway's Scream Magazine graded the album 4 out of 6, describing Mystoria as "a musical journey that frustrates as much as it engages", due to various influences. There were good melodies and guitar work, albeit more "space rock"-tinged than the earlier output. Metal Hammer Norway gave 7.5 out of 10. Both reviewers compared Amplifier to Black Sabbath, Tool, Pink Floyd and Soundgarden. Metal Hammer's reviewer found Mystoria to contain the best of all these worlds, only deducting for a lack of "punch" in the production and sound. The album was furthermore lauded by Germany's Visions, and received a 4 out of 5 rating from Sputnik Music. Screamer Magazine praised Amplifier for stretching "their integral creative muscles further", echoed by Louder Than War who titled their review "21st century nu- prog at its best".

== Track listing ==
1. "Magic Carpet" – 3:41
2. "Black Rainbow" – 3:21
3. "Named After Rocky" – 5:02
4. "Cat's Cradle" – 5:03
5. "Bride" – 3:56
6. "Open Up" – 6:16
7. "Meld (Summer of Love)" – 5:41
8. "OMG" – 6:28
9. "The Meaning of If" – 2:54
10. "Darth Vader" – 6:39
11. "Crystal Mountain" – 4:29
12. "Crystal Anthem" – 4:15
