= Amplify (company) =

American education technology company

Amplify Education, Inc.
- Type: Private
- Industry: Education
- Predecessor: Wireless Generation
- Founded: 2000; 26 years ago Brooklyn, New York City, New York, U.S.
- Headquarters: 55 Washington Street Suite 800, Brooklyn, New York, U.S. 11201-1071
- Key people: Larry Berger
- Products: curriculum, assessments, consultations
- Website: amplify.com

Amplify (formerly Wireless Generation) is an American curriculum and assessment company founded in 2000. Amplify creates core and supplemental curriculum in English language arts, mathematics, and science, as well as assessments that turn data into instructional support for teachers. The company operates in all 50 states of the United States.

== History ==
=== Founding and sale ===
Wireless Generation was founded in 2000 by Larry Berger and Greg Gunn. The company sold its products and services to districts and states in the United States that used government funding for early reading and other programs. It also developed and maintained the New York City online warehouse of student data ARIS, and wrote the algorithm for the School of One, the New York City Department of Education's math help system. Berger served as the CEO of Wireless Generation until it was sold to News Corporation in 2010.

News Corp purchased a 90% stake in Wireless Generation for $360 million in 2010. At the time of the sale, the users of Wireless Generation software included three million students and 200,000 educators. Following the acquisition, News Corp invested $540 million into Amplify in order to expand its digital and tablet-based curriculum based on the Common Core State Standards.

Joel Klein, former chancellor for the New York City Department of Education and an executive vice-president with News Corp served as Wireless Generation's new CEO.

=== Name change and partnerships ===
In 2012, News Corp changed the name of its subsidiary to Amplify. That year, Amplify partnered with Smarter Balanced Assessment Consortium to develop reporting tools for teacher assessment. In 2013, they partnered again to create a digital library of formative test items and assessment tools.

=== Products ===
In 2013, Amplify released the Amplify Tablet, a customized Asus Android tablet with a suite of subscription-based software for K-12 teaching. The company released a new version of the Amplify Tablet designed by Intel in 2014.

Amplify offers Boost Reading, a digital literacy program that uses avatars and in-game rewards. In fiscal year 2026, the New York City Department of Education paid Amplify $12.4 million under contracts that included curricula in mathematics, science, and English language arts.

=== Acquisitions and funding ===
In October 2015, News Corp sold Amplify to a management team supported by a group of private investors, including Emerson Collective. Financial terms of the transaction were not disclosed and Larry Berger became CEO.

In 2018, Fast Company reported that Amplify's revenue was $125 million and served almost 4 million students. Also that year, the company released two digital supplemental programs, Amplify Close Reading and Amplify Fractions.

In October 2021, Amplify raised $215 million in growth funding.

In May 2022, Amplify acquired the Desmos curriculum and the website teacher.desmos.com. Desmos Studio was spun off as a separate public benefit corporation focused on building free-to-use math tools, such as an online graphing calculator.

In May 2023, Amplify received additional funding from Cox Enterprises and others to further its K-12 product offerings. At that time, Amplify had reached over 10 million students in all 50 states. In 2025, Desmos Classroom, a platform for math, was renamed Amplify Classroom and began offering new lessons in science and literacy.

== Partnerships ==
Amplify partnered with the Core Knowledge Foundation to publish and distribute materials across the U.S. for its Core Knowledge Language Arts (CKLA) program and its Spanish-language counterpart Caminos. CKLA is based on the science of reading and teaches reading, writing, listening, and speaking to students in preschool through Grade 5. It includes material related to literature, American history, and the natural sciences.

Amplify developed Amplify Science in collaboration with the Lawrence Hall of Science at the University of California, Berkeley. The curriculum is aligned to the Next Generation Science Standards.

Amplify developed its mCLASS assessments in partnership with the University of Oregon. The mCLASS platform helps teachers administer DIBELS, and provides real-time data and targeted instructional resources.

== See also ==
- Education in the United States
- Mathematics education in the United States
