= Nurse-Family Partnership =

U.S. nonprofit organization

- Founded: 1970s
- Founder: David Olds
- Type: NGO (501(c)(3))
- Location: 1900 Grant Street, Suite 400, Denver, CO 80203
- Region served: United States
- Services: provides home visits from registered nurses to low-income first-time mothers
- Key people: Frank Daidone (President and CEO), Charlotte Min-Harris (Chief Operating Officer), Elizabeth Slater Jasper (Chief Legal Officer, General Counsel and Corporate Secretary), Alison Kolwaite (Chief of External Affairs), Sarah McGee (Chief Policy and Government Affairs Officer), Kate Siegrist (Chief Nursing Officer), Tony Troxell (Chief Financial Officer)
- Website: www.nursefamilypartnership.org

Nurse-Family Partnership (NFP) is a non-profit organization operating in the United States that connects mothers pregnant with their first child with registered nurses, who provide home visits until the child's second birthday. Studies have reported associations between the Nurse-Family Partnership intervention and outcomes related to maternal health, child health, and economic security.

The Nurse-Family Partnership program originated from a randomized controlled trial. The trial was conducted in a predominantly white, low-income neighborhood, located in Elmira, New York, in the late 1970s. For three consecutive decades, Professor David Olds and his colleagues conducted three similar randomized control trials, gathering research from each trial, which later contributed to the evidence-based development of the NFP. Randomized controlled trials were conducted in Elmira, New York; Memphis, Tennessee; and Denver, Colorado. The outcome of these trials proved that the NFP provided a tremendous number of benefits to children born in poverty stricken environments (Mason, 2016). Many of the families that participate in these trials had been experiencing many adversities, traumatic lifestyles events, and exposed to environments that were harmful to themselves and potentially harmful for their child. These parents expressed deep desires to protect and nurture their children and the NFP nurses facilitated resources and provided motivation to help change and eliminate these adversities to help create a better lifestyle and growing environment for both the parent and the child (Rowe, 2016).

== Theory ==
=== Bronfenbrenner's theory of human ecology ===
Bronfenbrenner's theory of human ecology holds the idea that throughout the lifespan, humans are impacted by their environments, and likewise, humans impact their environments. At "ecological transition" points, developmental opportunities are created from a change in environment or in the child's role.

Nurses study the mother's relationships with her partner and other people in her life, as well as the greater community dynamic, to help mothers navigate potential challenges they may face in motherhood. NFP begins during pregnancy to take advantage of this ecological transition point in the mother's life.

=== Bandura's self-efficacy theory ===
Bandura's theory of self-efficacy holds that when people believe in their ability to meet challenges and be successful, they are more likely to do so, and each success further fuels this belief. Giving someone a task that they believe they can perform is one way to enhance self-efficacy.

NFP aims to give mothers more confidence by asking them to recall past successes, as well as engaging them in problem-solving tasks.

=== Attachment theory ===
Bowlby's attachment theory holds that infants are biologically driven to bond with others, and this drive is reinforced by attentive parenting. Further, it is the child–caregiver relationship that shapes a child's development, making the quality of parental care in early childhood vital.

Attachment theory is used in NFP in two ways. First, it is used to encourage mothers to bond with their children (e.g., explaining that infants learn to recognize mother's voice in the womb, pointing out when the child expresses trust in and dependence on the mother). Second, it is used to inform the nurse's relationship with the mother to build trust, and to model the skill.

== Goals ==
NFP nurses work with mothers and families to achieve three major goals, which include improving: "1) the outcomes of pregnancy by helping women improve their prenatal health; 2) children's subsequent health and development by helping parents provide competent care; and 3) women's own health and self-sufficiency by helping them set goals for themselves and take steps to accomplish those goals, including planning the timing of subsequent pregnancies." Based upon such positive results from early clinical trials NFP was implemented across the United States in 1996 and contributed to the inclusion of funding for maternal and infant home visiting in the Affordable Care Act, of 2010. The NFP National Service Office (NSO) does provide support and training to NFP accredited sites to ensure adherence to the NFP model in addition to monitoring program implementation and outcome for quality improvement purposes.

== Target demographics ==
NFP targets low-income, first-time mothers, following the idea that the best time to teach health and development behaviors is during the mother's first pregnancy. This also gives time for mothers to work on potentially problematic behaviors before interacting face-to-face with the child. The mothers are often young and single; based on data collected from 1995 to 2017, the mothers in the program had a median age of 20, and 84% were unmarried. Additionally, 57% had completed high school, and the average yearly income was $9,000.

While NFP was developed to target mothers, the program welcomes fathers, partners, family members and close friends, to participate. The goal is to ensure that everyone who will be supporting the baby and ideally forming close attachments with him or her will be well-equipped to do so.

== Intervention delivery ==
=== Length and timing ===
Clients enroll in the program early in their pregnancy (usually during the first trimester) and continue until the child's second birthday. Ideally, the mother enrolls by week 16 of pregnancy, and it is required that the first meeting occur by week 28. The following table illustrates the standard visit schedule, but this is flexible, and is often adjusted based on the client's needs and availability.

Time Frame	Visit Schedule
First Month of Enrollment	Weekly
Remainder of Pregnancy	Every Other Week
First Six Weeks After Birth	Weekly
Six Weeks to 20 Months	Every Other Week
20-24 Months	Monthly

Visits can take place in the client's home, or in another location such as a community agency. Sessions last between 60 and 90 minutes.

=== Format ===
NFP is client-centered, meaning the nurse continuously adapts to ensure relevant and valuable sessions for the client; relational, meaning the primary tool for growth and learning is the relationship between the mother and nurse; strengths-based, meaning mothers reflect on their own successes to facilitate their learning and behavior change; and multi-dimensional, meaning it takes a holistic view of the mother and her life, aiming to affect various aspects of it.

Nurses use Prochaska's Transtheoretical Model of Change to help mothers work through problems. This framework assesses the mother's readiness to embrace a new behavior change and provides processes of change to guide her.

Content of Visits

The goal of prenatal visits is to facilitate compliance with health guidelines, coordinate care with physicians, and provide encouragement to the expecting mother. These sessions include completion of diet histories and tracking of weight gain, assessment and subsequent reduction of harmful health behaviors such as alcohol and drug use, training in identification of pregnancy complications, and coordination of help-seeking from nurses and physicians.

The goal of postnatal visits is to improve the child's physical and emotional care and promote parent–child attachment. These sessions include training in identification and management of child illness, facilitation of understanding child communicative signals, and enhancement of parent–child interactions that safely promote cognitive and emotional development.

=== Deliverers ===
==== Nurses ====
NFP nurses must be registered nurses with a bachelor's degree in nursing. NFP nurse training consists of three phases. First, there is an orientation unit, which includes 40 hours of self-study. Second, there is an in-person education/experiential practice unit, which takes place in 25 hours over 2–4 days in Denver, Colorado. Finally, there is a long-distance education unit, with around 10 hours of team-based, supervisor-led professional development modules.

==== Supervisors ====
"Nurse supervisors provide nurse home visitors clinical supervision with reflection, demonstrate integration of the theories, and facilitate professional development essential to the nurse home visitor role through specific supervisory activities, including one-to-one clinical supervision, case conferences, team meetings, and field supervision."

NFP Nurse Supervisors must be registered nurses with a bachelor's degree in nursing, and it is preferred that they also have a master's degree in nursing. In addition to the training completed by all nurses, supervisors are required to complete four introductory supervisor-education sessions, including two in-person sessions. Additionally, they attend a three-day, 20-hour supervisor education and refresher in Denver annually.

== Evidence of effectiveness ==
Findings in Relation to Intervention Goals

Improve Prenatal Outcomes

- 79% reduction in preterm birth for smoking mothers
- 18% reduction in preterm birth in general
- 35% reduction in pregnancy-induced hypertension

Improve Child Health and Development

- 25% reduction in child abuse and neglect
- 48% reduction in child abuse and neglect among low socioeconomic status mothers
- 56% reduction in emergency room visits for accidents and poisonings
- 50% reduction in language delays at 21 months
- 67% reduction in behavioral and intellectual problems at 6 years
- 59% reduction in child arrests at 15 years

Improve Family's Economic Self-Sufficiency and Future Planning

- 82% increase in months employed for parent
- 31% decrease in very closely spaced (>6 months) subsequent pregnancies
- 72% decrease in convictions of mothers

Cost/Benefit to Society

Every dollar invested in NFP saves $5.70 in future costs for the highest-risk families enrolled, most notably seen in government costs. For example, the increased economic self-sufficiency of enrolled families reduced Medicaid enrollment, leading to an 8.5% reduction in costs.

== Locations ==
=== United States ===
NFP operates in over 700 counties across 40 states, as well as in the U.S. Virgin Islands.

=== United Kingdom ===
In the UK the programme is known as the Family Nurse Partnership and has been backed by the NHS to deliver a service to 16,000 of the most disadvantaged new parents in the country.

However, there has been less success in the UK than in the USA. A 2015 study from Robling, et al. found improved/earlier identification of safeguarding risks and a valued relationship between mother and nurse, but no benefit to short-term outcomes. In response, FNP has introduced Next Steps, which aims to increase beneficial outcomes, program flexibility, personalization, cost-effectiveness, and knowledge-exchange between services.

=== Netherlands ===
A 2011 study found that NFP was successfully adapted into the Dutch healthcare system and was expected to have a positive impact on pre- and postnatal risk factors. Later studies found that NFP was successful at reducing intimate partner violence for the duration of the intervention, reducing smoking, increasing duration of breastfeeding, reducing child maltreatment, improving long-term home environments, and reducing child internalizing behaviors, but unsuccessful at targeting pregnancy outcomes.

== Funding ==
=== Private funding ===
NFP is supported through a combination of individual and foundation/corporation donors. Foundations and corporations that support or have supported NFP include the Edna McConnell Clark Foundation, Bill and Melinda Gates Foundation, Robert Wood Johnson Foundation, W.K. Kellogg Foundation, Kresge Foundation, Johnson & Johnson, and others.

=== Government funding ===
Many of NFP's programs are carried out in conjunction with federal, state, and local governments and are funded through various programs of these governments. Funding sources include Affordable Care Act, Medicaid and Temporary Assistance for Needy Families.

== External reviews ==
=== GiveWell review ===
Charity evaluator GiveWell reviewed Nurse-Family Partnership in Fall of 2010. Until November 2011, Nurse-Family Partnership was rated as the top US charity recommended for GiveWell donors. In November 2011, GiveWell changed NFP's review to outstanding, because they felt that NFP did not have any short-term need for more funding.

=== Other reviews ===
Nurse-Family Partnership has received two consecutive four-star rating from Charity Navigator, the highest possible rating awarded from the U.S.-based charity evaluator. NFP received a rating of 60.37/70 with a financial rating of 56.98/70 and an accountability rating of 66/70.

The Center for High Impact Philanthropy listed the Nurse-Family Partnership as a high-impact opportunity in its holiday giving guide and elsewhere on its website.

The Coalition for Evidence-Based Policy published a detailed review of the evidence of success of the NFP's programs on its website.

GuideStar has awarded the Gold participation level to Nurse-Family Partnership for its commitment to data transparency.

Great Nonprofits awarded Nurse-Family Partnership the Top-Rated Nonprofit award.

== Media and blog coverage ==
Nurse-Family Partnership has been covered in media outlets such as Time, The New York Times, The New Republic, The Washington Post, and USA Today.

NFP has received favorable coverage in the blogs and opinion pieces of a number of think tanks including the Center for American Progress and the Brookings Institution.

== Criticisms ==
Practitioners may experience burn-out given that nurses carry a caseload of at least 25 families, endure emotionally taxing work, and often lack agency support. This can lead to high turnover, which then compounds the situation as current nurses must take on departing nurses' caseloads. However, a stable workforce is associated with higher retention.

== See also ==
- Southwest Human Development
