= Head Start (program) =

U.S. federal aid program for low-income childcare

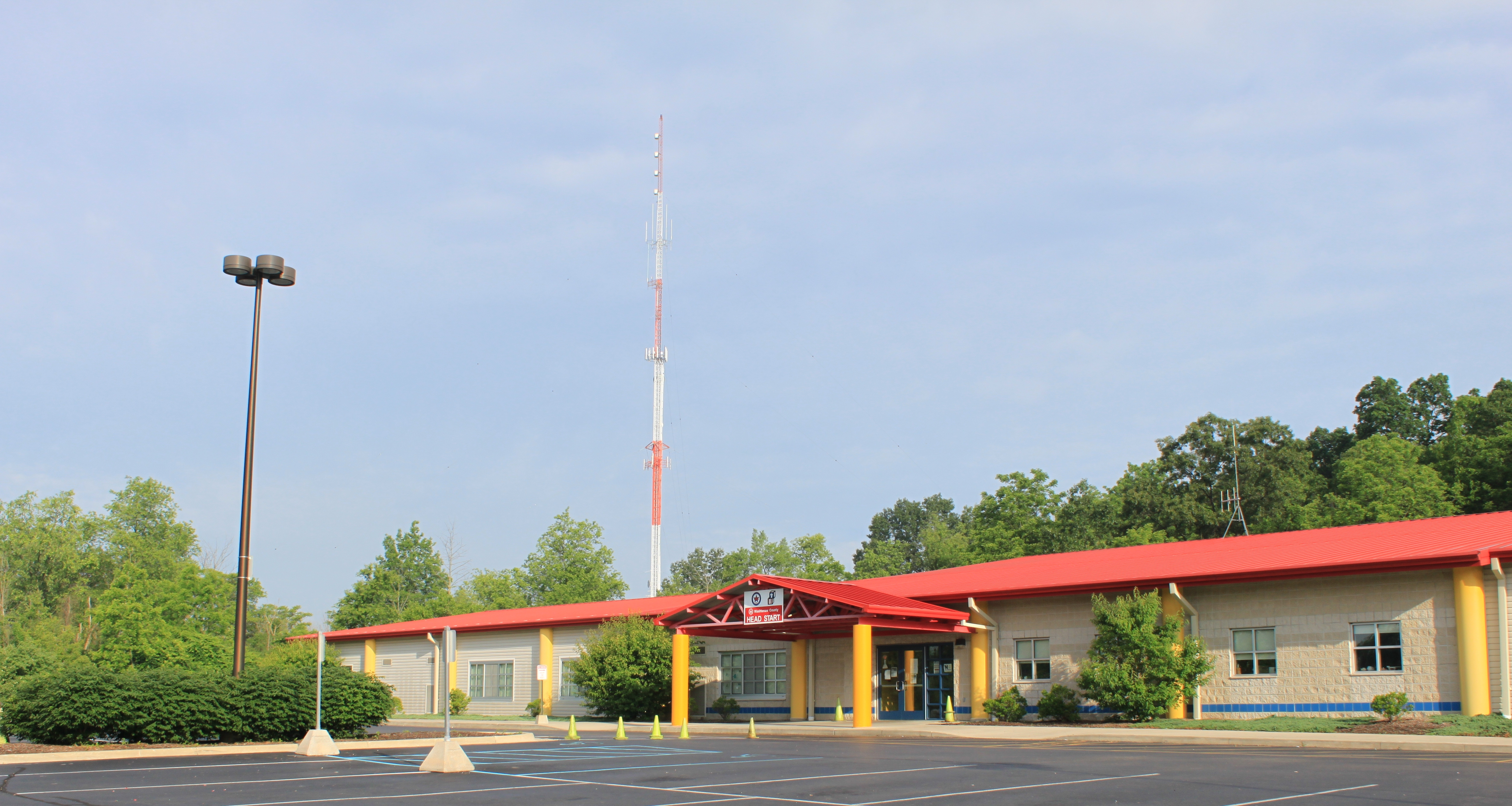
Washtenaw County, Michigan Head Start school in Superior Township

Head Start is a program of the United States Department of Health and Human Services since 1965 that provides comprehensive early childhood education, health, nutrition, and parent involvement services to low-income children and families. It is the oldest and largest program of its kind. The program's services and resources are designed to foster stable family relationships, enhance children's physical and emotional well-being, and establish an environment to develop strong cognitive skills. The transition from preschool to elementary school imposes diverse developmental challenges that include requiring the children to engage successfully with their peers outside the family network, adjust to the space of a classroom, and meet the expectations the school setting provides.

Launched in 1965 by its creator and first director Jule Sugarman and Bernice H. Fleiss, Head Start was originally conceived as a catch-up summer school program that would teach low-income children in a few weeks what they needed to know to start elementary school. The Head Start Act of 1981 expanded the program. The program was revised and reauthorized in December 2007. As of late 2005, more than 22 million children had participated.

== History ==
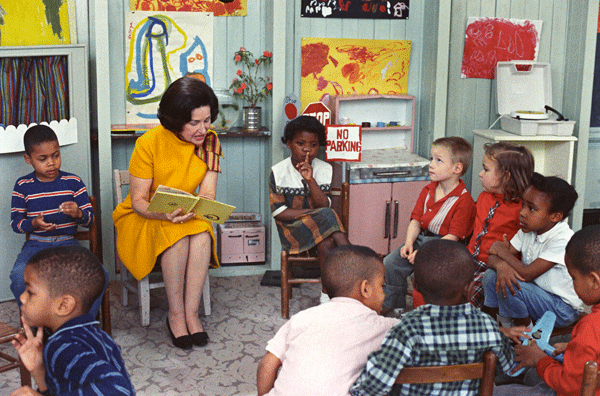
First Lady Lady Bird Johnson visits a Head Start class in 1966.

Head Start began as part of President Lyndon B. Johnson's Great Society campaign. Its justification came from the staff of the President's Council of Economic Advisers. Stan Salett, civil rights organizer, national education policy adviser, and creator of the Upward Bound Program, is also credited with initiating the Head Start program.

Johnson started the War on Poverty shortly after President Kennedy's assassination. The murder shook the nation, and Johnson attempted to gain public trust by passing legacy legislation during the subsequent months. Johnson received an initial briefing from Walter Heller, who informed Johnson of Kennedy's poverty program. By March 1964, the legislation, now known as the Economic Opportunity Act of 1964, had been prepared for Congress. The legislation included training, educational, and service programs for communities, including the Job Corps. In 1965, President Lyndon B. Johnson, commissioned Dr Edmund W. Gordon, to help design the Head Start Program.

The Office of Economic Opportunity's Community Action Program launched Project Head Start as an eight-week summer program in 1965. The program was led by Dr. Robert Cooke, a pediatrician at Johns Hopkins University, and Dr. Edward Zigler, a professor of psychology and director of the Yale Child Study Center. They designed a comprehensive child development program intended to help communities meet the needs of disadvantaged preschool children. Rather than proceeding with a smaller pilot program, the decision was made to roll it out on a large scale with the enrollment of 500,000 children in 2,500 communities. The following year it was authorized by Congress as a year–round program. In 1968, Head Start began funding a television series that would eventually be called Sesame Street, operated by the Carnegie Corporation Children's Television Workshop (CTW).

In 1969, Head Start was transferred to the Office of Child Development in the Department of Health, Education, and Welfare (later the Department of Health and Human Services (DHHS)) by the Nixon Administration. Today the program is in the Administration for Children and Families (ACF) division of DHHS.

In 1994, the Early Head Start program was established to serve children from birth to age three, in an effort to capitalize on research evidence that showed that the first three years are critical to children's long-term development.

In the early years, some 700,000 children enrolled at a per-capita cost of $2,000 to $3,000 (2011 dollars). Under the full-time program, enrollment dropped to under 400,000 by the early 1970s. Enrollment reached close to 1 million children by 2011. The program has experienced underfunding and under-enrollment in recent years. In 2023, there were about 820,000 children enrolled in the program.

== Policy Council ==
The Head Start Policy Council makes up part of the Head Start governing body. The Policy Council must be composed of two types of representatives: parents of currently enrolled children and community representatives. At least 51% of the members of this group must be the parents of currently enrolled children (see 45 CFR 1306.3(h) for a definition of a Head Start Parent). All parent members of the Policy Council stand for election or re-election annually through individual parent groups. Grantees/Delegates are required to provide proportionate representation to parents in all program options and settings. If agencies operate programs serving different geographical regions or ethnic groups, they must ensure that all groups being served will have an equal opportunity to serve on the Policy Council. The Policy Council is required to meet once each month. The term follows the federal government fiscal year, running November–November. Service on the Policy Council board is limited to at most five one year terms. The meetings are conducted in accordance with Robert's Rules. The meeting day and time is agreed upon during the first meeting of the term year and may be adjusted as needed.

The Policy Council approval is needed for several program functions, from new hires to the program, as well as for the budget and spending. The Council can serve the program in ways that the others in the program cannot, as it is the only body that is part of Head Start that can do fundraising. In addition to monthly meetings, the Policy Council may at times need to hold special or emergency meetings or have a phone vote. Policy Council representatives are required to attend classroom meetings and report back to the Policy Council with issues and needs of the classroom. They may also be asked to sit in on interviews as Head Start requires that a Policy Council representative be present for all interviews. The officers of the Policy Council include vice-chairperson, secretary, and vice-secretary. Classrooms are also able to elect alternate Policy Council reps in case the main rep is unable to attend the meetings.

== Services and programs ==
Head Start serves over 1 million children and their families each year in urban and rural areas in all 50 states, the District of Columbia, Puerto Rico and the U.S. territories. Related health services include health screenings and check-ups, eye examinations and dental check-ups. Meals and snacks are also provided, which can help ease financial pressure on families and improve children's diets. Family advocates assist parents in accessing community resources. All services are specific to each family's culture and experience. Head Start programs also seek to support children's social emotional development.

Programs and services include:

- Early Head Start promotes healthy prenatal outcomes, healthy families, as well as infant and toddler development beginning as early as birth.
- Head Start helps to create healthy development and early childhood education in low-income children ages three to five.
- Family and Community Partnerships engage and support parents to identify and meet their own goals, nurture their children, and advocate for communities that support children and families.
- Migrant and Seasonal services are for children of migrant and seasonal farm workers. Service hours are longer and programs extend for fewer months than traditional Head Start.
- Head Start serves indigenous Americans with centers on reservations and in urban communities.
- Homeless children were included explicitly as subjects with the 2007 re-authorization. Programs must identify and provide services to homeless children of all ages within a reasonable period. The McKinney-Vento Homeless Assistance Act of 2001 also requires access to early childhood education such as Head Start for homeless children and families.

== Eligibility ==
Eligibility is largely income-based, although each local program includes other eligibility criteria, such as disabilities and services needed by other family members. Families must earn less than 100% of the federal poverty level. Programs may accept up to 10% of the total children over poverty given the program has unfilled spots and the over poverty is less than 130%.

2023 Federal Poverty Level
Family Size	Income
2	$19,720
3	$24,860
4	$30,000
5	$35,140
6	$40,280
7	$45,420
8	$50,560

The federal poverty line measure is not absolute, and it changes yearly to account for inflation. Families may also qualify under a categorical eligibility category—receipt of Temporary Assistance to Needy Families (TANF) funds, Supplemental Nutrition Assistance Program (SNAP), Supplemental Security funds, or Homeless, as per the McKinney-Vento Act. Up to 10% of any funded program's enrollment can be from higher income families or families experiencing emergency situations. All programs are required to provide services to children with disabilities, who must comprise 10% of their total enrollment. Per the Head Start Act (2007), programs may elect to serve families whose income is between 100-130% under certain circumstances. Programs must also complete additional reporting requirements if this is appropriate for their community.

Military families stationed abroad can apply for Sure Start. Sure Start is the military version of Head Start and is overseen by the Department of Defense Education Activity. There are four priority tiers for Sure Start, and like Head Start, not all eligible families are guaranteed a spot. The tiers are based on the sponsor's rank and are, in order, E1-E4, E5, E6-E7, and E8-E9.

HHS POVERTY REGISTER
YEAR	First Person	Each Additional Person	Four Person Family	Page with Complete Details
2023	$14,580	$5,140	($30,000)	Federal Register 2023
2022	$13,590	$4,720	($27,750)	Federal Register 2022
2021	$12,880	$4,540	($26,500)	Federal Register 2021
2020	$12,760	$4,480	($26,200)	Federal Register 2020
2019	$12,490	$4,420	($25,750)	Federal Register 2019
2018	$12,140	$4,320	($25,100)	Federal Register 2018
2017	$12,060	$4,180	($24,600)	Federal Register 2017
2016	$11,880	Varies	($24,300)	Federal Register 2016
2015	$11,770	$4,160	($24,250)	Federal Register 2015
2014	$11,670	$4,060	($23,850)	Federal Register 2014
2013	$11,490	$4,020	($23,550)	Federal Register 2013
2012	$11,170	$3,960	($23,050)	Federal Register 2012
2011	10,890	3,820	( 22,350)	Federal Register 2011
2010	10,830	3,740	( 22,050)	Federal Register 2010 (Jan)Federal Register 2010 (Aug)
2009	10,830	3,740	( 22,050)	Federal Register 2009
2008	10,400	3,600	( 21,200)	Federal Register 2008
2007	10,210	3,480	( 20,650)	Federal Register 2007
2006	9,800	3,400	( 20,000)	Federal Register 2006
2005	9,570	3,260	( 19,350)	Federal Register 2005
2004	9,310	3,180	( 18,850)	Federal Register 2004
2003	8,980	3,140	( 18,400)	Federal Register 2003
2002	8,860	3,080	( 18,100)	Federal Register 2002
2001	8,590	3,020	( 17,650)	Federal Register 2001
2000	8,350	2,900	( 17,050)	Federal Register 2000
1999	8,240	2,820	( 16,700)	Federal Register 1999
1998	8,050	2,800	( 16,450)	Federal Register 1998
1997	7,890	2,720	( 16,050)	Federal Register 1997
1996	7,740	2,620	( 15,600)	Federal Register 1996
1995	7,470	2,560	( 15,150)	Federal Register 1995
1994	7,360	2,480	( 14,800)	Federal Register 1994
1993	6,970	2,460	( 14,350)	Federal Register 1993
1992	6,810	2,380	( 13,950)	Federal Register 1992
1991	6,620	2,260	( 13,400)	Federal Register 1991
1990	6,280	2,140	( 12,700)	Federal Register 1990
1989	5,980	2,040	( 12,100)	Federal Register 1989
1988	5,770	1,960	( 11,650)	Federal Register 1988
1987	5,500	1,900	( 11,200)	Federal Register 1987
1986	5,360	1,880	( 11,000)	Federal Register 1986
1985	5,250	1,800	( 10,650)	Federal Register 1985
1984	4,980	1,740	( 10,200)	Federal Register 1984
1983	4,860	1,680	( 9,900)	Federal Register 1983
1982	4,680	1,540	( 9,300)	Federal Register 1982

== Budget and funding ==
The 2011 federal budget for Head Start was $8.1 billion. 85% was to be devoted to direct services and no more than 15% on administration, serving approximately one million students. The budget was $12 billion in 2023.

Local grantees must provide a 20% cash/in-kind match. Each local grantee is required to obtain an annual financial audit, if it receives more than $500,000 in federal support.

Grants are awarded by the Administration for Children and Families (ACF) Regional Offices and the American Indian – Alaska Native and Migrant and Seasonal Program Branches directly to local public agencies, private organizations, Indian tribes and school systems.

The individual Head Start classrooms/centers "repay" the grant through a program known as InKind. The Inkind program is a way to get their parents and their students working together on out of class studies.

== Teachers ==
All lead teachers must have a bachelor's degree or be working towards one. Most have completed six or more courses in early-childhood education. By 2013, all teachers were to have associate degrees in a related field and half must have bachelor's degrees.

As of 2003, the average Head Start teacher made $21,000 per year, compared to the public school teacher average of $43,000.

Teachers are also required to complete a Child Development Associate (CDA) certificate.

== Operations ==
While Head Start is a national program, the implementation is up to individual states. Head Start programs typically operate independently from local school districts. Most often they are administered through local social-services agencies. Classes are generally small, with fewer than ten enrollees per adult staff member. Individual programs develop their own academic and social curricula, following federal performance standards.

== Impact ==
Angel Taveras speaks about how Head Start changed his life as a child.

According to a 2024 article published in Science, long term studies of Head Start have had "discouraging" results. While early boosts in literacy were observed, these disappeared after several years, and:

"In the third-grade assessments of children who were 4 years old when they entered the lottery for Head Start slots, none of the 11 literacy and math achievement-related measures was statistically significant at the P < 0.05 level. Of 19 socioemotional outcomes, only one survived multiple testing adjustments, and in that case, teachers reported that children who were offered a Head Start slot displayed more emotional symptoms than children who lost the lottery."

A 2020 study found that cohorts that attended Head Start had higher incomes and years of education as adults than similar children who did not attend. A 2021 study found that the children exposed to more generous Head Start funding had substantially improved test scores relative to children that were not exposed to generous Head Start funding. Another 2021 study found that students enrolled in Head Start ended up having substantially higher high school completion, college enrollment and college completion rates than comparable children who were not enrolled in Head Start. The authors of the study concluded that "these estimates imply sizable, long-term returns to investments in means-tested, public preschool programs." A 2009 study, which compared siblings, found that those who attended Head Start showed stronger academic performance as shown on test scores for years afterward, were less likely to be diagnosed as learning-disabled, less likely to commit crime, more likely to graduate from high school and attend college, and less likely to suffer from poor health as an adult. This study was replicated in a 2020 study which looked at 10 additional birth cohorts, and found a negligible impact.

A 2022 study found that Head Start increased the employment and earnings of single mothers.

In 2015, CCR Analytics, formerly Child Care Analytics, published the results of their Family Outcomes Survey completed by nearly 11,600 California Head Start and Early Head Start parents. 90% of parents surveyed said that Head Start helped them to get or keep a job. 92% of parents surveyed said that Head Start helped them to enroll in an educational or training program. 99% of families surveyed said that Head Start helped them to improve their parenting skills, such as responding to children's misbehavior and helping their children to learn. These results indicate that Head Start has a positive impact on the whole family, beyond the individual children who attend the program.

In 2014, CCR Analytics published the results of their study of 49,467 children assessed in the 2012–2013 school year from 81 Head Start programs throughout the state of California (more than 50% of the entire California Head Start population). Participation in the study was open to all California Head Start programs who used the DRDP-PS 2010 assessment tool. The study found that providing two years of Head Start to a child increases the probability by between 13% and 86% that the child will meet age appropriate expectations. Regression discontinuity design was used to measure program impact without denying a control group the opportunity to attend Head Start. The analysis compared three-year-olds enrolled in Head Start to four-year-olds who returned to Head Start for their second year. This also eliminated the issue of selection bias because both groups chose to attend Head Start as three-year-olds.

Lee collected data across sixty Head Start classrooms in 2007 and 2008. A sample of 1,260 children ages three to four were selected as the final sample. Of these children, 446 had entered Head Start at age 3 and enrolled for a year (Group 1); 498 had been entered at age 4 and enrolled for a year (Group 2); and 316 children had been enrolled for 2 years, entering at age 3 (Group 3). Academic outcome measures in literacy, math and science were collected based on the Head Start and Early Childhood Program Observational Checklist rating on a 4-point scale (1—not yet to 4—excels. Family risk factor indicators (developed by the State Department of Education) included single parent, unemployed parent, teenage parent, parental loss (divorce/death), low parental school achievement, food insufficiency. Group 3 had higher literacy, math and science scores than the other groups. Children in the high-risk group had significantly lower literacy, math, and science scores than those who had three or fewer risk factors. Head Start is associated with significant gains in test scores. Head Start significantly reduces the probability that a child will repeat a grade.

In 2002, Garces, Thomas and Currie used data from the Panel Survey of Income Dynamics to review outcomes for close to 4,000 participating adults followed from childhood and compared with non-participant siblings. Among European Americans, adults who had attended Head Start were significantly more likely to complete high school, attend college and possibly have higher earnings in their early twenties. African-American adults who had attended Head Start were significantly less likely to be booked/charged for a crime. Head Start may increase the likelihood that African-American males graduate from high school. Separately the authors noted larger effects for younger siblings who attended Head Start after an older sibling.

In 1998, Congress mandated an intensive study of the effectiveness of Head Start, the "Head Start Impact Study," which studied a target population of 5,000 3- and 4-year-old children. The study measured Head Start's effectiveness as compared to other forms of community support and educational intervention, as opposed to comparing Head Start to a nonintervention alternative. Head Start Impact Study First Year Findings were released in June 2005. Study participants were assigned to either Head Start or other parent–selected community resources for one year. 60% of the children in the control group were placed in other preschools. The first report showed consistent small to moderate advantages to 3-year-old children including pre-reading, pre-vocabulary and parent reports of children's literacy skills. No significant impacts were found for oral comprehension, phonological awareness, or early mathematics skills for either age group. Fewer positive benefits were found for 4-year-olds. The benefits improved with early participation and varied across racial and ethnic groups. These analyses did not assess the benefits' durability.

In 1975, Seitz, Abelson, Levine and Zigler compared disadvantaged children enrolled and not enrolled in Head Start, using the Peabody Picture Vocabulary Test (PPVT). The participants were low-income inner-city black children whose unemployed, economically disadvantaged parents were considered unskilled. The Head Start children had attended for at least five months at the time of testing, including nine boys and 11 girls. The non-enrolled group was on the Head Start waiting list. The control group consisted of 11 boys and nine girls. The groups were matched by family income, parental employment and marital status. The tester tested children at home and in a school or office setting. The Head Start children scored higher than the controls in both settings, which suggested preschool intervention programs may have influenced the result. The controls tested at home scored the lowest, apparently due to anxiety from having an unfamiliar person in their homes. The Head Start children were unaffected by the environmental factor. In evaluating this study vs. others, the relatively small sample size should be noted: 20 children vs. thousands in other studies.

A 2005 review of the literature by Barnett and Hustedt found "mixed, but generally positive, evidence regarding Head Start's long-term benefits. Although studies typically find that increases in IQ fade out over time, many other studies also find decreases in grade retention and special education placements. Sustained increases in school achievement are sometimes found, but in other cases flawed research methods produce results that mimic fade-out. In recent years, the federal government has funded large-scale evaluations of Head Start and Early Head Start. Results from the Early Head Start evaluation are particularly informative, as study participants were randomly assigned to either the Early Head Start group or a control group. Early Head Start demonstrated modest improvements in children's development and parent beliefs and behavior."

A 1995 within-family analysis compared subjects with nonparticipant siblings. Mothers who had themselves been enrolled in Head Start were compared to adult sisters who were not. Currie and Thomas separately analyzed white, black and Hispanic participants. White children showed larger and longer lasting improvements than black children.

"Head Start Fade", in which significant initial impacts quickly fade, has often been observed, as early as second and third grade. One hypothesis is that the decline is because Head Start participants are likely to attend lower-quality schools, which fail to reinforce Head Start gains. Fryer and Levitt found no evidence that Head Start participation had lasting effect on test scores in the early years of school.

A 2010 report by the Department of Health and Human Services, Head Start Impact, examined the cognitive development, social-emotional development, and physical health outcomes of 4,667 three- and four-year-old children in a nationally representative sample of programs across 23 states. Children were randomly assigned to either a Head Start group (participants) or a non–Head Start group (control group). The children in the two groups were similar in all measured characteristics at program entry. Pre-participation assessments of all critical outcome measures were taken. Control group children optionally enrolled in non–Head Start programs. Nearly half of the control-group children enrolled in other preschool programs. Outcome measures covered cognitive development, social-emotional development, health status and access to health care, and parenting practices. Head Start students were split into two cohorts – 3-year-olds with two years of Head Start and 4-year-olds with one year of Head Start. The study found:

- Participants showed positive effects in cognitive skills during their Head Start years, including letter-naming, vocabulary, letter-word identification and applied math problems, although the "advantages children gained during their Head Start and age 4 years yielded only a few statistically significant differences in outcomes at the end of 1st grade for the sample as a whole. Impacts at the end of kindergarten were scattered. ..." The gains applied to different skills across cohorts and grades, undermining generalizations about program impacts.
- Participants showed fewer significant improvements in social and behavioral skills, even in the Head Start year, with inconsistent results between the three- and four-year-old cohorts. The four-year-old cohort showed no significant improvement in the Head Start year or kindergarten, but in third grade, parents reported a significant reduction in total problem behavior and social and behavioral skills. Three-year-olds showed multiple, significant improvements in social and behavioral skills, but only for outcomes assessed by parents. Significant negative effects emerged in teacher relationships as rated by first-grade and third-grade teachers; and no significant positive effects for this cohort were reported by teachers for any elementary year.
- By the end of first grade, only "a single cognitive impact was found for each cohort". Compared to students in the control group, the 4-year-old Head Start cohort did "significantly better" on vocabulary and the 3-year-old cohort tested better in oral comprehension.
- Head Start had significant health-related effects, especially in increasing the number of children receiving dental care and having health-insurance coverage. These effects were not consistent, however. For example, while participants increased health-insurance coverage, it did not extend into the third-grade year for either cohort. Parenting practice changes were significant, but applied only to the three-year-old cohort. Most related to discipline, such as reduced spanking or time-outs. The spanking outcome occurred did not last into the first grade. The significant effect on parental reading to children did not last into kindergarten.

The HSIS study concludes, "Head Start has benefits for both 3-year-olds and 4-year-olds in the cognitive, health, and parenting domains, and for 3-year-olds in the social-emotional domain. However, the benefits of access to Head Start at age four are largely absent by 1st grade for the program population as a whole. For 3-year-olds, there are few sustained benefits, although access to the program may lead to improved parent-child relationships through 1st grade, a potentially important finding for children's longer-term development."

In an op-ed piece in The New York Times, "Head Start Falls Further Behind", Besharov and Call discuss a 1998 evaluation that led to a national reevaluation of the program. The authors stated that research concluded that the current program had little meaningful impact.

In 2011, Time magazine's columnist Joe Klein called for the elimination of Head Start, citing an internal report that the program is costly and makes a negligible impact on children's well-being over time. Klein wrote, "You take the million or so poorest 3- and 4-year-old children and give them a leg up on socialization and education by providing preschool for them; if it works, it saves money in the long run by producing fewer criminals and welfare recipients ... it is now 45 years later. We spend more than $7 billion providing Head Start to nearly 1 million children each year. And finally there is indisputable evidence about the program's effectiveness, provided by the Department of Health and Human Services: Head Start simply does not work."

W. Steven Barnett, director of the National Institute for Early Education Research at Rutgers University, rebutted Klein, writing that "Weighing all of the evidence and not just that cited by partisans on one side or the other, the most accurate conclusion is that Head Start produces modest benefits including some long-term gains for children."

== Access ==
There is not enough government funding to provide Head Start for all eligible families, so to enroll in Head Start, families must apply and then be chosen. In 2017, there were 1 million children enrolled in Head Start and Early Head Start, but there were about 19 million children under five in the United States and around 3 million children under five living in poverty.

Head Start covers families living below the federal poverty line, but there 65% of children under the age of 6 having both their parents (or one parent, if they are a single parent) in the workforce. Hotz and Wiswall's research found that for two-parent households, childcare is the most expensive cost outside their rent or mortgage; in perspective, the median percent of income that goes towards childcare is 30%.

== See also ==
- Arkansas Early Learning
- Compensatory Education
- HighScope
- Jenny Is a Good Thing, an Academy Award–nominated documentary on children and nutrition produced for Project Head Start
- Project STAR
- Southwest Human Development
- Sure Start
- Upward Bound
