= Amplify Tablet =

Android-based tablet

- Developer: Amplify
- Manufacturer: ECS
- Type: Tablet
- Operating system: Android 4.2 "Jelly Bean"
- CPU: 2.0 GHz dual-core Intel Atom Processor Z2580
- Memory: 2 GB
- Display: 10.1" IPS Capacitive multi-touch 1280 × 800 WXGA Corning Gorilla Glass
- Graphics: PowerVR SGX 544 MP2
- Sound: speaker, microphone, headset jack
- Input: Multi-touch screen, compass, GPS, Ambient light sensors, 3-axis accelerometer-gyroscope
- Camera: Rear: 5 MP autofocus Front: 1.3 MP fixed focus.
- Connectivity: 802.11 a/b/g/n 2.4 and 5 GHz 2 × 2 MIMO + HT40
- Online services: Amplify
- Website: Official website

The Amplify Tablet is an Android-based tablet. The Amplify Tablet is bundled with custom software designed to enable a "personalized" learning experience for students, allowing them to manage classwork, access online resources, and interact with class assignments or other students. A new version of the tablet was released in 2014 in order to contend with problems its predecessor had encountered in the classroom environment.

== Development and release ==
The Amplify Tablet was developed by Amplify Education—the education subsidiary of Rupert Murdoch's News Corp, in conjunction with its Common Core-based digital curriculum products. Amplify's CEO Joel Klein stated that the goal of the device was to help "to transform the way teachers teach and students learn." The device emphasizes a "blended learning" model built around the "language of the web", which combines digital means of teaching with traditional means inside and outside a classroom. Amplify began trialing the platform at schools in November 2012, before its general launch at SXSWedu on March 6, 2013. Guilford County Schools became the first school board to officially deploy Amplify, with the announcement that it would distribute 15,450 Amplify Tablets to the students and staff of its middle schools for the 2013-14 school year.

== Specifications ==
Intel Education designed the current version of the Amplify Tablet, which connects to the Internet through a dual-band dual-antenna WiFi radio, added to help with general connectivity challenges in school environments. It comes with a dual-core Intel Atom Processor Z2580 running at 2.0 GHz with Android 4.2 "Jelly Bean" according to Intel. The devices also come with Bluetooth and a battery charge that lasts the length of the school day. It is also equipped with two cameras, a 1.3 mp camera on the front and 5mp camera on the back. Entering the 2014 school year, devices are leased to schools on a three-year contract. It comes pre-loaded with educational material from publishers like Encyclopædia Britannica and Merriam-Webster Dictionary, in addition to apps like Desmos Graphic Calculator and StudyBlue.

Previous versions of the Amplify Tablet used similar hardware to the Asus Transformer Pad TF300T, with a 10 inches (250 mm) screen, Nvidia Tegra 3 quad-core system-on-chip, and a 5 megapixel rear-facing camera. The Amplify Tablet was available in two models, a Wi-Fi only model, and an "Amplify Tablet Plus" model which added support for AT&T Mobility's LTE network.

The tablet's home screen displays an application launcher and a sidebar organizing class subjects into a list of "Notebooks". The software also enables a suite of classroom management functions for teachers, such as automatically determining attendance, collecting feedback, taking class polls, tracking users who are on task, blocking access to apps, and distributing classroom material.

== Guilford County distribution ==
On October 4, 2013, Guilford County Schools announced that it would recall all of the Amplify Tablets and accessories that it had deployed for quality and safety concerns, after reports that a student's charger had overheated and melted. The recall by Guilford County was also intended to address other hardware faults with the tablets; the board stated that around 1,500 of the tablets already had broken screens (and did not use Gorilla Glass, as they had specifically requested), and about 175 of their chargers were broken. An external evaluator stated that there were no manufacturing defects in the devices sent to Guilford County. Amplify spokesperson Justin Hamilton noted that the defective charger was an isolated occurrence, but that Guilford's deployment had a larger number of broken screens than other deployments. Guilford County Schools resumed using the devices in 2014 following a pilot program that showed the initial problems had been resolved, stating that Amplify's response to their situation was part of the reason they would continue to work with them. A 2015 agreement between GCS and Amplify Education permanently severed their relationship at the end of the 2015-16 school year.

== See also ==
- Comparison of tablet computers
- One Laptop Per Child
