= Amplified (band) =

Hong Kong band

- Origin: Hong Kong
- Genres: Rock
- Years active: 2006–2008
- Label: Sony Music (DefSTAR Records)
- Members: Chris Edwards; Terrence Ma; Kai-Yuan Neo

Amplified is a rock band consisting of three young boys from Hong Kong. While from Hong Kong, they are primarily known in Japan. They were discovered through Sony Music Japan's International Audition, and signed to the Sony subsidiary DefSTAR Records. Their debut single, "Mr. Raindrop" was used as the second ending theme for the anime Gintama. Their debut album, Turn It Up!, was released on 2 August 2006. Their second album, titled Sesh the Sweet Sounds, was released on 25 July 2007. The new lead track is named "Elevator". The music video was shot entirely inside a set of elevators in Tokyo.

Amplified was the opening act for part of Ellegarden's 2007 tour of Japan.

== Members ==
- Chris Edwards: vocals and guitar
- Terrence Ma: vocals and bass
- Kai-Yuan Neo: drums

All three members of the band grew up in Hong Kong and attended Chinese International School. They attended St. Paul's School in Concord, New Hampshire.

Terrence Ma attended Brown University in Rhode Island. Chris Edwards attended Carnegie Mellon University in Pittsburgh. Kai Yuan Neo attended Stanford University.

== Discography ==
=== Albums ===
- Turn it up! (2 August 2006)
- Sesh the sweet sounds (25 July 2007)
