= The Works Recording Studio =

Recording studio located in Stockport, Greater Manchester, UK between 1998 and 2007

Coordinates: 53.422°N 2.102°W

The Works Recording Studio was a recording studio located in Stockport, Greater Manchester, England between 1998 and 2007.

== History ==
Built in a Victorian rectory it was originally an analogue studio used by unsigned bands and fading stars of Manchester's rich musical scene including ex-members of The Smiths and The Stone Roses. In 2001 it installed a Pro Tools system, and then recorded albums for bands such as Amplifier, Oceansize, Inertia Blooms and Performance. In 2005 there was a bizarre 3 a.m. appearance by U.S. rap star Snoop Dogg who visited the studio after playing a concert, bringing an entourage of musicians, enormous bodyguards and a chef. The studio also branched out into making music videos. In 2007 "Super Producer" Timbaland used the studio whilst on tour with Justin Timberlake.
