= Johansson Mikrokator =

Mechanical comparator

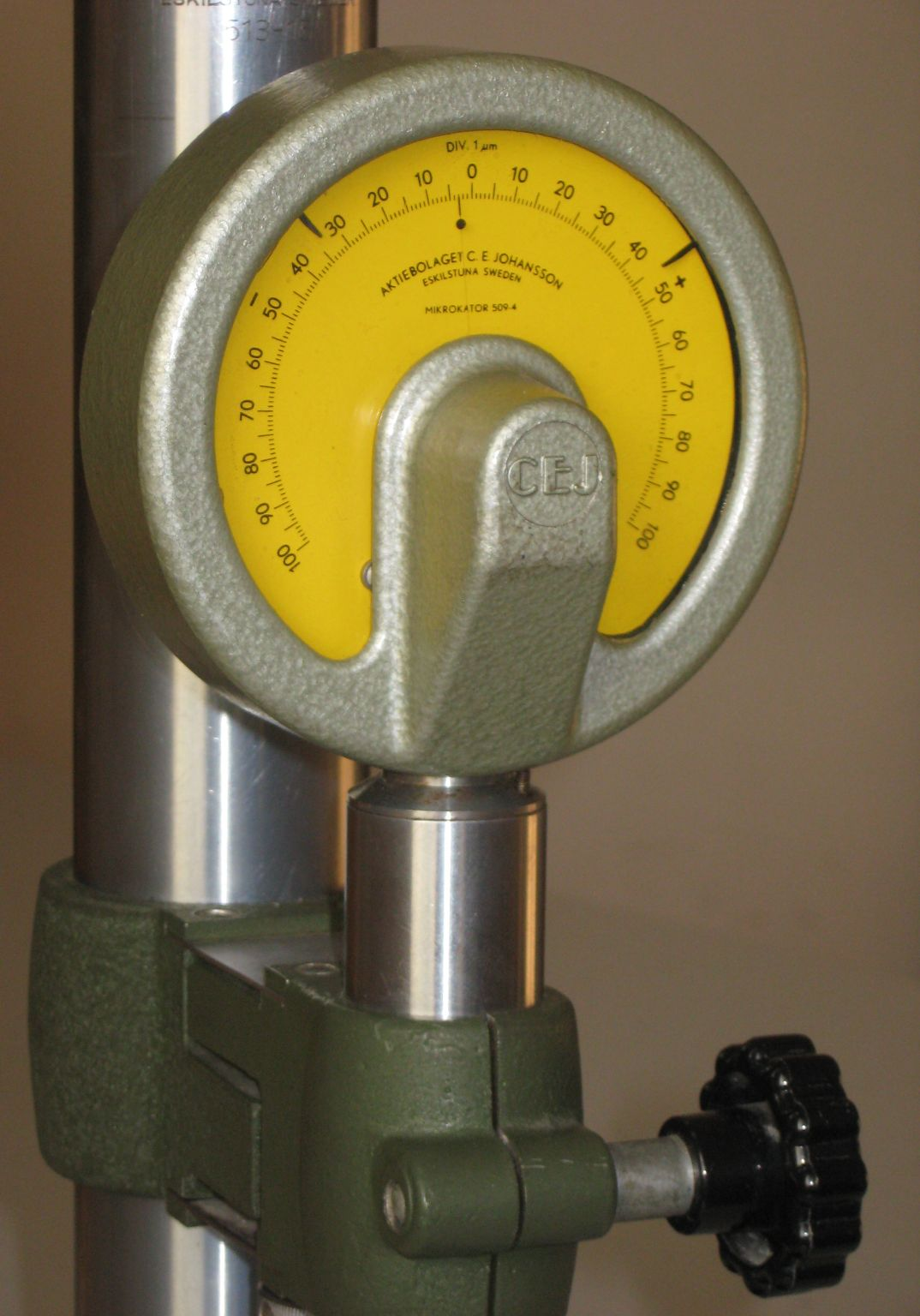
Mikrokator 509–4 C.E Johansson Eskilstuna Sweden

A Johansson Mikrokator (also called Abramson's movement) is a mechanical comparator used to obtain mechanical magnification of the difference in length as compared to a standard. It works on the principle of a button spinning on a loop of string. A twisted thin metal strip holds a pointer, which shows the reading on a suitable scale. Since there is no friction involved in the transfer of movement from the strip to the pointer, it is free from backlash. It was reportedly designed by Hugo Abramson in 1938.

== Construction ==
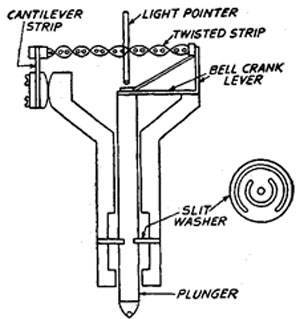
Johansson mikrokator

A metallic strip is twisted and fixed between two ends as shown. Any longitudinal movement (in either direction) will cause the central portion of the strip to rotate. One end of the strip is fixed to an adjustable cantilever and the other end is fixed to the spring elbow. The spring elbow, in turn, is connected to a plunger, which moves upwards or downwards. The spring elbow, which consists of flexible strips and a stiff diagonal acts as a bell crank lever and causes the twisted strip to change length whenever there is a movement in the plunger. This change in length will result in a proportional amount of twist of the metallic strip. The magnification can be varied by changing the length of the spring elbow.

== Operation ==
The instrument is initially calibrated to the standard, and the zero is set to this value. Then, the test specimen are placed on the measuring table and are slid below the plunger of the instrument. Any difference in the measured dimension of the specimen will result in either the lowering or rising of the plunger. The lowering or rising of the plunger will cause the bell crank lever to move in forward or backward direction, and in turn, will twist or untwist the metallic strip. The centre line of the strip is perforated in order to prevent excessive stress.
