= Early Head Start =

US federally funded program for low-income families

Early Head Start is a federally funded community-based program for low-income families with pregnant women, infants, and toddlers up to age 3. It is a program that came out of Head Start. The program was designed in 1994 by an Advisory Committee on Services for Families with Infants and Toddlers formed by the Secretary of Health and Human Services. "In addition to providing or linking families with needed services—medical, mental health, nutrition, and education—Early Head Start can provide a place for children to experience consistent, nurturing relationships and stable, ongoing routines."

Early Head Start offers three different options and programs may offer one or more to families. The three options are: a home-based option, a center-based option, or a combination option in which families get a set number of home visits and a set number of center-based experiences, There are also locally designed options, which in some communities include family child care.

- Tri-Counties Regional Center is one of twenty-one non-profit regional centers in California providing lifelong services and supports for people with developmental disabilities residing in San Luis Obispo, Santa Barbara and Ventura Counties.
- Early Start is California's response to federal legislation ensuring that services to eligible infants and toddlers are coordinated and family-centered. It is a statewide system of early intervention services for infants and toddlers from birth to 36 months of age. This program is coordinated by regional centers and public school districts.
- Each eligible child will be assigned a Service Coordinator who will be responsible for the coordination of early intervention services. Eligible children and their families may receive a variety of early intervention services. Services for young children are family-centered, based on family concerns, priorities and resources, and provided in a child's natural setting. Services may include, but are not limited to:
  - Infant stimulation (specialized instruction) in your home or community
  - Physical, occupational and/or speech/language therapy
  - Behavior services
  - Family Resource Centers for parent-to-parent support

== Important areas ==
1. Child Development: "Programs must support the physical, social, emotional, cognitive, and language development of each child." This also includes educating and supporting parents and positive parent-child relationships. The program must provide the following services or it must refer families to outside services that provide these:
  1. Developmentally appropriate education services for young children this includes developmentally appropriate settings, activities, and resources;
  2. Home-visits;
  3. Parent education and parent-child activities;
  4. Complete health and mental health services; and
  5. High quality child care services provided by or in partnership with local child care centers
2. Family Development: Programs must help families develop and reach goals for both parents and children. Each family will work with the staff to create a family development plan that focuses on all different needs of the family including social, economic, and the child's developmental needs. Families involved in multiple programs will receive help to integrate all programs into one plan and system of services. The services that programs must provide directly or through referral include:
  1. Information on child development;
  2. Complete health and mental health services, this includes alcohol and substance abuse treatment and assistance with quitting smoking;
  3. Parents will receive adult education, literacy, and job skills training to foster family's independence.
  4. Families will get help in obtaining income support, safe housing, or emergency cash; and
  5. Families will receive help with transportation to early head start program services to allow all participants access to the program and services.
3. Community Building: In order to create a complete network of services and support for pregnant women and families with infants and toddlers, Early Head Start must assess a community and its services. The goal is to create a network in the community to support these families and their needs by giving them access to services and making these services more efficient for all families in the community.
4. Staff Development: The quality of the staff is a key structure of the Early Head Start program. Staff members involved with the program must develop supportive relationships with parents and children. Staff will have a continuous learning process which includes trainings, supervision, and mentoring in order to keep them focused on the main goals of the program and help them build better relationships with both families and children. Development will be focused on child development, family development, and community development.
5. Administration/Management: The administration and management used with the Early Head Start programs will follow the practices which uphold the nine principles and four cornerstones set forth in the Early Head Start initiative. All staff must be cross-trained in the areas of child, family, and community development. Relationship-building will be the focus and basis for interactions between children, families, and staff members.
6. Continuous Improvement: On-going training and technical assistance is provided by the Infant/Family Network and the EHS NRC, this in addition to other trainings, mentoring, research, and evaluations enables the Early Head Start program staff and services to meet the needs of families and their children better. Continuous training ensures that staff will be up to date and constantly informed on program policies and guides.
7. Children with Disabilities: Early Head Start programs will be responsible for coordinating with different programs and services in their areas in accordance with Part C of the Individuals with Disabilities Education Act. The Early Head Start program ensures that children with disabilities will not be excluded, and that these children will receive all the services they need and be included in all program activities. This gives all children equal access to services and resources to ensure proper child development.
8. Socialization: The Early Head Start program focuses on socialization of infants and toddlers the most important relationship at this age is between children and their parents. Socialization between infants and toddlers and their peers is also important but is not the main focus. Socialization gives parents a chance to be in a setting where they can interact with their child, other parents, and qualified staff in order to learn more about their child's development and develop more as a family. It is one more way families can receive support and education. Socialization also helps with community and team building by bringing many different members together and increasing communication and relationship.
9. Curriculum: The Early Head Start curriculum plays an extremely important role in the development and education of young children in the program. The curriculum includes five aspects: 1-the goals designed by staff and parents for the child's growth, development, and learning; 2-the experiences and activities through which the child will achieve the goals set for them; 3-what the staff and parents will do to support and help the child achieve these goals; and 4- the materials needed to facilitate and support the implementation of the curriculum in order for the child to reach these goals.

== Eligibility for the program ==
Early Head Start is a child development program for low-income families with infants and toddlers. "Each Early Head Start program is responsible for determining its own eligibility criteria." Key factors in determining eligibility are

- Family income, which is evaluated by the federal poverty guidelines.
- Early Head Start programs may choose to target their services to a particular population of their community in order to meet its needs better
- Involvement in the child welfare system. These include children who: have been physically, mentally or emotionally abused; children who have been neglected; infants whose parents have exposed them to drugs or alcohol and do not have a suitable caretaker; and children whose parents have died, gone to jail, or been hospitalized.
- Many Early Head Start Locations have programs to help rehabilitate families that have been affected by drugs or alcohol. This program is not solely targeted at the child's development but is aimed at helping the entire family and community develop so that the relationships with the child will be healthier and improved.

== Early Head Start Research and Evaluation (EHSRE) Project 1996–2010 ==
In 1996, the Department of Health & Human Services (DHHS) launched a large-scale evaluation of Early Head Start (EHS) by randomly assigning qualifying families at 17 sites nationally to participate and looking at their social, psychological, developmental and academic outcomes compared to a matched control group. Families in the control group were able to receive any services available to them. The evaluation followed families over five time points, according to the child's age: 14 months, 24 months, 36 months, pre-kindergarten and 5th grade.

== Supportive findings for children's development ==
Findings from the DHHS evaluation demonstrate significant, positive impacts on children's social-emotional development (e.g. reduced aggression), as well as in children's abilities to engage in learning activities. These results are seen as early as at the 24-month time point, but continue through the pre-kindergarten time point. Additionally, recent findings from the 5th grade time point reveal that children enrolled in EHS develop more complex reasoning skills and exhibit fewer behavior problems. However, these results vary by the type of school children were enrolled in (high poverty versus low poverty). Children with the highest outcomes in 5th grade were those who had been enrolled in EHS, had also received formal early child at ages 3 to 4 and attended a relatively lower-poverty school.

== Mixed findings for children's development ==
The results as related to children's language development are mixed, such that some broad reports discuss minimal to no impact and other individual academic manuscripts detail specific, complex supportive findings. Additionally, two groups seemed to benefit the most from enrollment in EHS: those enrolled during pregnancy with the child who would later be in the program, and African American children and their families. The formatting of the EHS program mattered, as well, as children who were enrolled in a "mixed approach to service delivery" (home visiting and classroom education) received the greatest benefits. Finally, parents who attended parenting classes were more likely to engage in strategies that promote positive development. These pieces of evidence may point to a "dosage" effect, such that children who received the most quality early child care experience and had parents who attended parenting classes (in addition to other demographic risk factors) may reap the most from Early Head Start.

== Supportive findings for parenting and the home environment ==
As Early Head Start is a "two-generation" program, the goal is to promote healthy parental development as well as a stimulating home environment through enrollment in EHS. EHS demonstrated effectiveness at increasing parental support for language and literacy development, including daily reading and increased teaching activities in the home through the pre-kindergarten time point. EHS parents also reported using fewer punitive discipline strategies with their children. Additionally, the positive impacts on parenting and parenting behaviors was seen by the 36-month time point for families living in low sociodemographic risk, but did not emerge until the pre-kindergarten time point for families living in high sociodemographic risk.
