= The Octopus (album) =

Studio album by Amplifier
- Released: 21 January 2011
- Recorded: 2006–2010
- Genre: Progressive rock
- Length: 120:32
- Label: Ampcorp.Industries
- Producer: Sel Balamir

Amplifier chronology
| Eternity (2008) | The Octopus (2011) | Fractal (2011) |

Professional ratings
Review scores
| Source | Rating |
|---|---|
| Drowned in Sound | 8/10 stars |
| Rock Sound | 9/10 stars |
| Ultimate Guitar Archive | 9.5/10 stars |
| BBC Music | (very favourable) |
| Classic Rock | 8/10 stars |

The Octopus is the third studio album of the Manchester space rock band Amplifier. The format of the album is double CD. It was released to fans online in December 2010 and was commercially released in January 2011. In reviewing the album, the BBC stated that it was "an album that commands respects and time to be afforded to it, but the rewards are plentiful. If two discs seem slightly overwhelming at first, then the other perspective is that there is so much quality to digest here that your value for money is not even in question." The album can be listened to online at a mini-site set up by the band. The Octopus vinyl edition was released in October 2019 with "The Eternal" as an exclusive bonus track.

== Track listing ==
=== CD 1 ===
| No. | Title | Length |
|---|---|---|
| 1. | "The Runner" | 3:38 |
| 2. | "Minion's Song" | 5:51 |
| 3. | "Interglacial Spell" | 6:25 |
| 4. | "The Wave" | 6:58 |
| 5. | "The Octopus" | 9:18 |
| 6. | "Planet of Insects" | 5:50 |
| 7. | "White Horses at Sea // Utopian Daydream" | 8:55 |
| 8. | "Trading Dark Matter on the Stock Exchange" | 11:32 |

=== CD 2 ===
| No. | Title | Length |
|---|---|---|
| 1. | "The Sick Rose" | 8:58 |
| 2. | "Interstellar" | 10:18 |
| 3. | "The Emperor" | 6:39 |
| 4. | "Golden Ratio" | 5:14 |
| 5. | "Fall of the Empire" | 8:30 |
| 6. | "Bloodtest" | 5:16 |
| 7. | "Oscar Night // Embryo" | 7:44 |
| 8. | "Forever and More" | 9:20 |

== Credits ==
- Sel Balamir – guitar, vocals, production and Mixing
- Neil Mahony – bass
- Matt Brobin – drums
- Charlie Barnes – piano
- Mike Vennart – guest vocals
- Jon Astley – mastering
