= Amplifier (band) =

English rock band

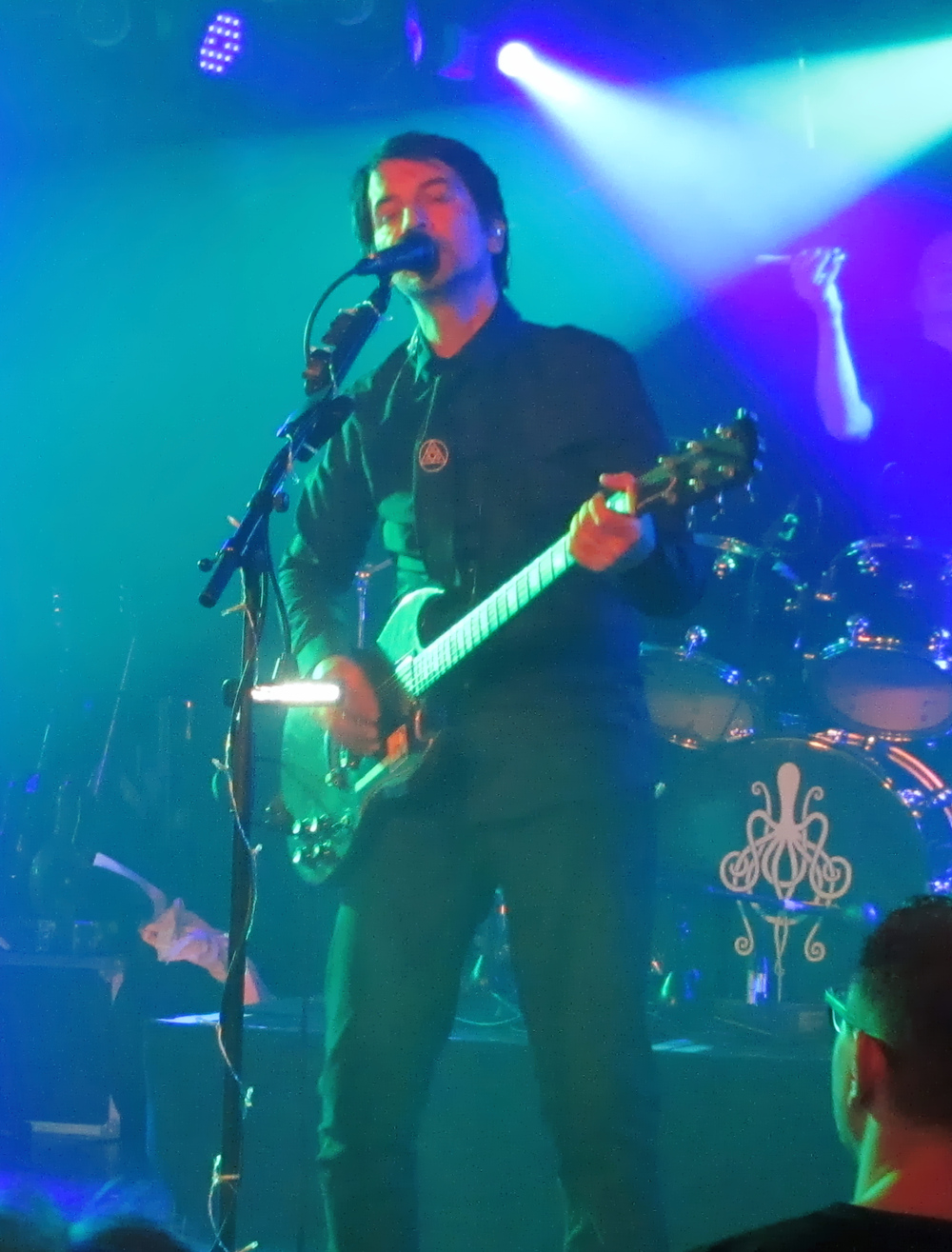
- Amplifier live, 2018

Background information
- Origin: Manchester, England
- Genres: Progressive rock, space rock, psychedelic rock, alternative rock
- Years active: 1999–present
- Labels: Kscope, Ampcorp, SPV, Music For Nations, Superball Music, Rockosmos
- Members: Sel Balamir; Matt Brobin
- Past members: Neil Mahony; Alexander Redhead; Steve Durose
- Website: www.amplifierband.com

Amplifier are an English rock band originating from Manchester. The band has released eight studio albums and eight EPs since its inception in 1999. Their music has been described as "Soundgarden, Tool, Black Sabbath, Oceansize and Pink Floyd taking copious amounts of mind-altering substances and venturing on a trip through time and space (to another dimension), and back again." Their music is characterised by guitarist Sel Balamir's effect pedals, Matt Brobin's complex drumming, extended heavy sections, atmospheric compositions and philosophical lyrics.

Their self-titled debut album, Amplifier, was released in 2004 by Music for Nations. Their second album, Insider was released in Europe in 2006 on the SPV label. Their third album, The Octopus, was released to fans in December 2010 ahead of a full release in January 2011. Their fourth album, Echo Street was released in 2013, and the fifth album, Mystoria, was released in September 2014. They are often cited as one of the most underrated bands of the UK's rock scene, although they retain a strong cult following around Europe.

== History ==
=== Early career and Amplifier (1998–2005) ===
After forming around 1998 Amplifier toured the UK and recorded a few demos and sent promo CDs to labels and the press. After being signed in May 2002 by British label Music for Nations, Amplifier were asked to support Deftones at Manchester Apollo. After the two singles "The Consultancy" (b/w "Glory Electricity") and "Neon" (b/w "Boomtime" and "Throwaway"), the band’s self-titled debut album, Amplifier, was released on 6 June 2004 by Music for Nations – which is a subsidiary of the larger label distributor Zomba Records – and was very well received by English media and critics. As well as the standard 10-track jewel case, the album was released as a 13-track digipak. The extra tracks were the two segues ("Drawing No 1" and "Drawing No 2") and new track "Half-Life".

The label ran out of funds and was bought-out by Sony, which was not interested in working with smaller bands. After buying the rights for the album back the band went label-hunting. In 2005, they signed a deal with SPV (Germany). The debut was re-released in May 2005 with a second disc containing the three B-sides and "Half-Life" and videos for the singles "The Consultancy" and "Neon".

Throughout 2005, the band toured across both the UK and Europe. The EP "The Astronaut Dismantles HAL", which contains 6 songs as well as a hidden track, was released on 17 October 2005. In 2006, the band played numerous festival dates including opening the main-stage at Download Festival, UK.

=== Insider (2006–2008) ===
Their second album, titled Insider includes 12 tracks, three of which were posted to the band's MySpace before the album's release. The band also recorded extra tracks to be used as future B-sides. The album was released on 29 September 2006 in Germany and Austria and 2 October in the rest of Europe on SPV in a digipak with 12-page booklet. "Procedures" was chosen as a radio single to promote the album and has been played by Zane Lowe on Radio One. No singles from the album will be released to the public. A video for "Procedures" was filmed during the band's Munich show, on the European tour.

After their own UK and European tour, Amplifier were main support for Opeth's European Tour. During their European tour in early 2007 they were supported by the Swiss indie rock band Cloudride. Before taking time to write and record their third album Amplifier were main support to Porcupine Tree on their UK tour in April 2007.

=== The Octopus (2009–2012) ===
In March 2008, Amplifier confirmed that they were recording their third and fourth albums simultaneously. In January 2010, Amplifier confirmed that this had changed and that they planned to release the combined works as a double album, named The Octopus. The album was released online a year later in 2011, quickly followed by a full release on 21 February 2011. It was met with generally positive acclaim in the press. After his former band Oceansize had broken up, guitarist Steve Durose joined Amplifier for their 2011 tour. In mid-2012 the band announced the departure of Neil Mahony who was replaced by Alexander "Magnum" Redhead for the band's support tour with Anathema the same year.

=== Echo Street and Sunriders EP (2013–2014) ===
Their fourth album Echo Street was released in March 2013. The band stated that they recorded the album in sixty days. It is also their first effort under their new record label, Kscope and the first one to chart, peaking at number 90 on the German Albums Chart. The band began touring in mainland Europe and the UK in spring, after headlining the Pearl Festival in Hyderabad, India. On 20 November 2013, the Sunriders EP was released online.

=== Mystoria and Residue EP (2014–2015) ===
The band moved to the Superball Music label early in 2014 and began work on their fifth album, Mystoria, recording at Monnow Valley Studio in the May of that year. The album was released on 8 September 2014 in the UK and mainland Europe, and on 30 September in the USA. It is their first record to break into the Top 100 in the UK, peaking at 97, and at number 91 on the German Albums Chart. The band resumed touring by adding dates around Europe in October and the UK in November. The band released the Residue EP, which was limited to 500 copies and was sold on the tour.

=== Trippin' With Dr. Faustus and Rockosmos (2016–2021) ===
After the release of Mystoria, the band decided to start their own independent label, Rockosmos. Besides releasing their own music on it, they signed local acts such as AWOOGA, Dead Blonde Stars or Thumpermonkey among others. In June 2017, the band's 6th studio record, Trippin' With Dr. Faustus was released in several formats. Starting December 2017, an EP of outtakes, called Record was available as a digital download. In 2018, Amplifier re-released their critically acclaimed, self-titled debut LP on the Rockosmos label as CD and 2LP, followed in April 2019 by The Octopus on 4LP. This is the first vinyl release for the latter, limited to 500 copies. The Insider 2LP edition followed in October 2021.

=== Hologram and Gargantuan (2022–present) ===
In December 2022, Amplifier posted a brand new song, "Two Way Mirror", the first single off their 7th studio album, Hologram. Initially, Balamir mentioned Gargantuan as the follow-up LP to Trippin' With Dr. Faustus, however, the former is still in the writing phase. As a result, five songs from the respective sessions were picked and released as Hologram, whereas Gargantuan will be released at a later date. Two weeks ahead of its official release date on 7 April, Hologram was premiered online on the Rockosmos Youtube channel. The promotional photographies included only the two founding members, Sel Balamir and Matt Brobin, hinting at the fact that they are sole Amplifier members at the moment. Gargantuan was released on 4 April 2025, coinciding with the band's first tour in six years.

=== Live performances ===
Amplifier's live stage performance is dominated by Sel Balamir's use of many effects and loops controlled by a large board of pedals and controls, a similar (if smaller) arrangement also used by Alex Redhead for bass guitar. The combinations of effects lead to a sound much greater than the number of performers would normally be able to produce, and unusual sounds and soundscapes that would otherwise require additional musicians with different instruments, but without diminishing the 'live' feel. Amplifier have a devoted following as a live band, particularly in mainland Europe, and amongst members of the Manchester music community.

Amplifier released a DVD/CD package entitled Live in Berlin in 2009, comprising the following tracks "Continuum", "Fall of the Empire", "Panzer", "Motorhead", "The Wave", "Interglacial Spell", "Interstellar", "Golden Ratio" and "Neon".

As of 2025, live performances consist of the remaining founding members, Sel Balamir and Matt Brobin, playing as a duo. They have previously recorded rehearsals and performed live streams, before embarking on their first tour in six years.

== Members ==
Current members

- Sel Balamir – lead vocals, guitar (1999–present), bass (2020–present)
- Matt Brobin – drums (1999–present)

Live members

- Tam Ali – bass, backing vocals (2018–2020)

Former members

- Neil Mahony - bass, backing vocals (1999–2012)
- Alexander "Magnum" Redhead – bass, backing vocals (2012–2018)
- Steve Durose – guitar, backing vocals (2011–2020)

== Discography ==
=== Studio albums ===
- 2004: Amplifier (reissued in 2005)
- 2006: Insider
- 2011: The Octopus (including the 70-page booklet 'limited edition')
- 2013: Echo Street (GER #90)
- 2014: Mystoria (GER #91, UK #97)
- 2017: Trippin' with Dr. Faustus
- 2023: Hologram
- 2025: Gargantuan

=== Live albums ===
- 2009: Hymn of the Aten - Eternity Show
- 2013: Live in Barcelona
- 2015: Live at the Exchange
- 2018: Live at Luxor
- 2020: MCR/18

=== EPs ===
- 1999: Untitled demo
- 2005: The Astronaut Dismantles HAL
- 2009: Eternity
- 2011: Fractal
- 2013: Sunriders
- 2014: Residue (reissued digitally in 2017)
- 2015: Residue Part 2
- 2017: Record

=== Singles ===
- 2003: "The Consultancy"
- 2004: "Neon"
- 2005: "Everyday Combat" (radio promo only)
- 2006: "Procedures" (radio promo only)
