= Hélène Ségara discography =

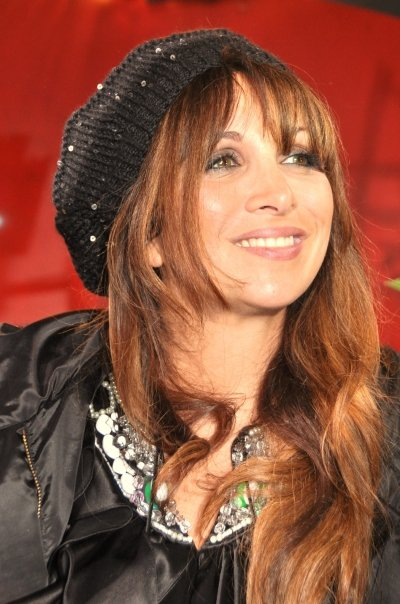
- Hélène Ségara in 2009
- Studio albums: 11
- Live albums: 1
- Compilation albums: 2
- Singles: 29
- Music videos: 2
- Tours: 3

The discography of Hélène Ségara, a French pop singer, consists of eleven studio albums, various compilation albums, one live albums and twenty-nine singles. Throughout her singer career, Ségara has obtained success in France and Francophone Belgium.

Her debut album, Cœur de verre, was released on 17 September 1996. It sold about 400,000 copies, peaked at number six in France, and provided the top 15 singles "Je vous aime adieu" and "Les Vallées d'Irlande", and the number-one hit "Vivo per lei (je vis pour elle)", a duet with Italian singer Andrea Bocelli.

On 25 January 2000, Ségara released her second album, Au Nom d'une Femme, which achieved more success and remained her most successful album. It reached the top of the French and Belgium charts and two its singles, "Il y a trop de gens qui t'aiment" and "Elle, tu l'aimes...", became smash hits, reaching respectively the first and the third position on the SNEP chart. The album was a triumph: it sold about 1.3 million units and won a NRJ Music Awards in 2001 in the category 'Francophone album of the year'.

The third studio album, Hélène, was released in 2002 and contains Ségara's previous songs recorded in Spanish-language and had minor success. In March 2003, the fourth album Humaine was launched and immediately topped the French chart, selling about 500,000 units. It spawning the top three singles "L'amour est un soleil" and a duet with Laura Pausini, "On n'oublie jamais rien, on vit avec".

The next two albums, Quand l'éternité... and Mon Pays c'est la terre, were respectively released in September 2006 and November 2008. They both can be considered as failures, as although the first one entered the French chart at number one, it fell very quickly, and the second one remained for a short number of weeks in low positions on the charts.

== Albums ==
=== Studio albums ===
Year	Album details	Certifications (sales thresholds)	Peak position				
Year	Album details	Certifications (sales thresholds)	FR	FR (DD)	BE (WA)	SWI	FIN
1996	Cœur de verre: 1st studio album; Released: 17 September 1996; Translated title: Heart of Glass; Format: CD	BE: Gold (1999); FR: Platinum (1999)	6	—	12	—	—
2000	Au Nom d'une Femme: 2nd studio album; Released: 25 January 2000; Translated title: In the Name of a Woman; Format: CD	BE: Platinum (2000); FR: Diamant (2000)	2	—	1	9	—
2002	Hélène: 3rd studio album; Released: 2002; Translated title: Helen; Format: CD		—	—	135	—	—
2003	Humaine: 4th studio album; Released: March 2003; Translated title: Human; Format: CD	FR: 2× Platinum (2003)	1	—	3	5	16
2006	Quand l'éternité...: 5th studio album; Released: September 2006; Translated title: When the eternity...; Format: CD	FR: Gold (2006)	1	3	4	28	—
2008	Mon pays c'est la terre: 6th studio album; Released: 17 November 2008; Translated title: My Country it's the Earth; Format: CD		19	20	33	—	—
2011	Parmi la foule: 7th studio album; Released: 30 April 2011; Translated title: In the midst of craze; Format: CD		9	5	—	58	—
2013	Et si tu n'existais pas: 8th studio album; In duo with Joe Dassin; Released: October 2013; Translated title: If you didn't exist; Format: CD		2	7	—	56	—
2013	Tout commence aujourd'hui: 9th studio album; Released: December 2014; Translated title: Everything starts today; Format: CD		43	—	38	—	—
2016	Amaretti: 10th studio album; Released: September 2016; Format: CD		8	—	13	57	—
2021	Karma: 11th studio album; Released: 11 June 2021; Format: CD		—	—	5	—	—
"—" denotes releases that did not chart or was not released.

=== Live albums ===
Year	Album details	Certifications (sales thresholds)	Peak position				
Year	Album details	Certifications (sales thresholds)	FR	FR (DD)	BE (WA)	SWI	FIN
2001	En concert à l'Olympia: 1st live album; Released: October 2001; Translated title : In Concert at the Olympia; Format: CD	FR: Gold (2001)	4	—	11	40	—
"—" denotes releases that did not chart or was not released.

=== Compilations ===
Year	Album details	Certifications (sales thresholds)	Peak position				
Year	Album details	Certifications (sales thresholds)	FR	FR (DD)	BE (WA)	SWI	FIN
2004	Le Best of: Best of album; Released: 26 November 2004; Translated title: The Best Of; Format: CD	FR: Gold (2004)	11	—	13	49	—
2007	Les 50 Plus Belles Chansons: Compilation album; Released: 5 November 2007; Translated title: The 50 Most Beautiful Songs; Format: CD		35	—	72	—	—
"—" denotes releases that did not chart or was not released.

=== Singles ===
Year	Title	Certifications (sales thresholds)	Peak position				Album
Year	Title	Certifications (sales thresholds)	FR	FR (DD)	BE (WA)	SWI	Album
1993	"Loin"	—	—	—	—	—	—
1996	"Je vous aime adieu"	Silver (1996)	13	—	16	—	Cœur de verre
1996	"Une Voix dans la nuit" ^{1}	—	—	—	—	—	Cœur de verre
1997	"Les Larmes" (remix) ^{1}	—	—	—	—	—	Cœur de verre
1997	"Auprès de ceux que j'aimais" ^{1}	—	—	—	—	—	Cœur de verre
1997	"Vivo per lei (je vis pour elle)" (duet with Andrea Bocelli)	Platinum (1998)	1	—	1	—	Cœur de verre
1998	"Loin du froid de décembre"	—	54	—	—	—	Cœur de verre
1998	"Vivre" ^{1}	—	—	—	—	—	Cœur de verre
1998	"Les Vallées d'Irlande"	Silver (1999)	15	—	27	—	Cœur de verre
1999	"Il y a trop de gens qui t'aiment"	Platinum (2000)	1	—	1	—	Au Nom d'une Femme
2000	"Elle, tu l'aimes..."	Gold (2000)	3	—	4	—	Au Nom d'une Femme
2000	"Parlez-moi de nous"	Silver (2000)	15	—	23	—	Au Nom d'une Femme
2001	"Tu vas me quitter"	Silver (2000)	7	—	10	—	Au Nom d'une Femme
2001	"Au Nom d'une Femme"	—	44	—	52	—	Au Nom d'une Femme
2001	"Mrs Jones" (live) ^{1}	—	—	—	—	—	En concert à l'Olympia
2002	"Donner tout"	—	15	—	20	—	—
2003	"L'amour est un soleil"	Gold (2003)	2	—	14	13	Humaine
2003	"Encore une fois"	—	32	—	58	77	Humaine
2003	"On n'oublie jamais rien, on vit avec" (duet with Laura Pausini)	Gold (2004)	3	—	2	3	Humaine
2004	"Humaine" ^{1}	—	—	—	—	—	Humaine
2004	"On ne dit pas"	—	26	—	—	61	Humaine
2005	"Ailleurs comme ici"	—	11	—	24	66	Ailleurs comme ici (best of)
2006	"Méfie-toi de moi"	—	18		34	96	Quand l'éternité...
2007	"Rien n'est comme avant"	—	20	?	34	—	Quand l'éternité...
2007	"Tu ne seras jamais libre" ^{1}	—	—	—	—	—	Quand l'éternité...
2007	"Father" ^{1}	—	—	—	—	—	Quand l'éternité...
2008	"La Moitié de nous" (duet with Bruno Pelletier)	—	6	?	8	—	—
2008	"Qu'est-ce qu'on va faire avec ce monde ?"	—	—	—	—	—	Mon Pays C'est La Terre
2009	"Danse à nouveau"	—	—	—	—	—	Mon Pays C'est La Terre
2011	"La vie avec toi"	—	—	—	48	—	Parmi la foule limited edition
2013	"Et si tu n'existais pas" (duet with Joe Dassin)	—	94	—	19 (tip)	—	Et si tu n'existais pas
2013	"Dans les yeux d'Émilie" (duet with Joe Dassin)	—	—	—	—	—	Et si tu n'existais pas
2014	"Tout commence aujourd'hui"	—	105	—	23 (tip)	—	
2016	"L'envol"	—	152	—	—	—	Amaretti
"—" denotes releases that did not chart or was not released.

^{1} Promotional singles

== DVD ==
- Au Nom d'une Femme
- Regards, released on 24 May 2005, Gold

== Tours ==
- Au Nom d'une Femme (2000–2002)
- Humaine (2003–2004)
- Quand l'éternité (2007–2008)
