= Cant del Barça =

Official anthem of FC Barcelona

"Cant del Barça" (Catalan pronunciation: [ˈkan dəl ˈβaɾsə]; lit. 'Barça chant') is the official anthem of FC Barcelona. It was commissioned in 1974 to celebrate the club's 75th anniversary. The lyrics were written by Jaume Picas and Josep Maria Espinàs and the music was composed by Manuel Valls.

The hymn was given its official debut on 27 November 1974 at Camp Nou before a game between FC Barcelona and East Germany. A 3,500 strong choir was conducted by Oriol Martorell. On 28 November 1998, during the clubs’ centenary, it was performed by Catalan singer-songwriter Joan Manuel Serrat at the end of a festival at the Camp Nou. Since 2008, Cant del Barça has been printed on official Barcelona replica jerseys.
