= Au nom d'une femme =

Studio album by Hélène Ségara
- Released: January 2000
- Recorded: France
- Genre: Pop
- Label: East West, Warner Music France
- Producer: Orlando

Hélène Ségara chronology
Cœur de verre (1996)	Au nom d'une femme (2000)	En concert à l'Olympia (2001)

Singles from Au nom d'une femme
- 1. "Il y a trop de gens qui t'aiment" Released: November 1999; 2. "Elle, tu l'aimes..." Released: 18 April 2000; 3. "Parlez-moi de nous" Released: September 2000; 4. "Tu vas me quitter" Released: January 2001; 5. "Au nom d'une femme" Released: June 2001

Professional ratings
Review scores
Source	Rating
Allmusic	3/5 stars

Au nom d'une femme is the second studio album recorded by French singer Hélène Ségara. It was released in January 2000, and achieved success in France, Belgium (Wallonia) and Switzerland, remaining Ségara's most successful album in terms of sales.

== Background ==
Ségara's second album, Au Nom d'une Femme was composed by various artists. As with her previous album, Loigerot, Geoffroy and Marc Nacash worked on several songs, and for the first time in Ségara's career, French singer Calogero composed one of her songs, "Au Nom d'une Femme" (afterwards, he also wrote "Regarde").

In France, there were five singles from this album. The first four were very successful: "Il y a trop de gens qui t'aiment", whose release preceded that of the album, was a number-one hit on the French Singles Chart and achieved Platinum status; "Elle, tu l'aimes..." hit number three and was also Platinum; "Parlez-moi de nous" (number 15) and "Tu vas me quitter" (number seven) were both certified Silver. "Au nom d'une Femme", the last single, was not as successful, only reaching number 44.

"Tu peux tout emporter" is a cover version of "Amore per te" by the Italian singer Mango.

In December 2000, the album was included in a box set also containing Ségara's first album, Cœur de verre, which peaked at number 41 on the French Albums Chart.

In 2001, Au nom d'une femme won an NRJ Music Award in the category "Francophone album of the year".

== Commercial performance ==
The album had very long chart trajectories in the three countries where it was released. In France, although it was unable to dislodge Louise Attaque's album Comme on a dit, it managed to enter the chart at number two on 29 January 2000, and stayed for four consecutive weeks at this place. It remained for 33 weeks in the top ten, 105 weeks in the top 100 and 109 weeks in the top 200, and hit Platinum status. It featured respectively at number four and number 22 on 2000 and 2001 charts. In 2002 and 2003, the album charted for ten weeks on the French Mid Price Chart, peaking at number nine on 26 December 2003.

In Belgium (Wallonia), the album went to number 28 on 5 February 2000, jumped to number three, then reached number two for two weeks, and finally topped the chart for three not consecutive weeks. It was charted for 33 weeks in the top ten and 75 weeks in the top 40. It was the best-selling album of 2000, and the 23rd one of 2001.

In Switzerland, Au Nom d'une Femme peaked at number nine in its second week, on 13 February 2000, remaining for 20 weeks in the top 50 and 59 weeks in the top 100, which is rather rare for a French artist in this country.

== Track listing ==
#	Title	Length
1.	"Il y a trop de gens qui t'aiment" (C.Vié / T.Geoffroy)	4:25
2.	"Mrs Jones" (new version) (C.Vié - C.Loigerot)	3:30
3.	"Il attend la pluie" (C.Vié / T.Geoffroy)	4:20
4.	"Elle, tu l'aimes..." (F.Brito / F.Trinidade)	5:05
5.	"Parlez-moi de nous" (H.Ségara / M.Nacash - N.Godsend)	4:01
6.	"Sempre, sempre" (G.Morra - H.Ségara / M.Fabrizio)	4:09
7.	"Tu vas me quitter" (L.Deck / C.Loigerot - T.Geoffroy)	4:06
8.	"Au nom d'une femme" (J.D'Aimé / Calogero)	3:39
9.	"Tu peux tout emporter" (H.Ségara / G.Mango / A.Mango / P.Panella) Adep. P.Videcoq / É.Gruninger	3:56
10.	"Je te perdrai" (H.Ségara / C.Loigerot)	4:32
11.	"Dites-moi qui je suis" (H.Ségara / M.Nacash - N.Godsend)	3:56
12	"Rebelles" (H.Ségara - A.Belatach / M.Wells - S.Abaldonata)	4:46

== Personnel ==
Design

- François Darmigny – photos
- Jean-Jacques Datchary – photos
- Patrick Causse – photos
- Barejo – cover
- Fathia Maghraoui – make up
- R.Solde / Alexis – hairdresser
- Hélène Busuttil – design

Tracks 1–3, 5, 8, 11

- Michel Coeuriot – progammation, production, conductor
- Stéphane Briand – mixing
- Laurent Faucheux – drum kit
- Laurent Vernerey – bass
- Thomas Coeuriot – guitar
- Celmar Engel – synth programming
- Michel Coeuriot – keyboards
- Anne Gravoin – violin, string director
- Hélène Blazy – violin
- Françoise Perrin – violin
- Jean-Philippe Kuzma – violin
- Annie Morel – violin
- Daniel Dato – violin
- Véronique Engelhard – violin
- Arnaud Nuovolone – violin
- Anne Villette – violin
- Jean-Lou Deschamps – violin
- Thomas Tercieux – violin
- Fanny Coupe – viola
- Christophe Gaugue – viola
- Christine Jaboulay – viola
- Setrag Koulakserian – viola
- Mathilde Sternat – cello
- Frédéric Lagarde – cello
- Jean-Claude Auclin – cello

Tracks 4, 6, 7, 9, 10, 12

- Sandro Abaldonato – programming and production
- Thierry Rogen, Studio Mega – mixing
- Xavier Poissonier – assistant
- Bertrant Châtenet – assistant (except 10, 12)
- Stéphane Briand – assistant (except 9)
- Sandro Abaldonato – keyboards
- Serge Eymar – Spanish guitar (tracks 4, 6, 7, 10)
- Hugo Ripoll – electric guitar (track 12)
- Loïck Ponthieu – drum (track 6)
- Laurent Verneret – bass (track 6)

== Charts ==
=== Weekly charts ===
Chart (2000/02)	Peak position
Belgian (Wallonia) Albums Chart	1
French Albums Chart	2
Swiss Albums Chart	9

=== Year-end charts ===
Chart (2000)	Position
Belgian (Wallonia) Albums Chart	1
European Albums Chart	42
French Albums Chart	4
Swiss Albums Chart	51
Chart (2001)	Position
Belgian (Wallonia) Albums Chart	23
French Albums Chart	22

== Certifications and sales ==
Region	Certification	Certified units/sales
Belgium (BRMA)	Platinum	50,000^{*}
France (SNEP)	Diamond	1,000,000^{*}
^{*} Sales figures based on certification alone.
