= Manuel Valls (composer) =

Catalan composer (1920–1984)

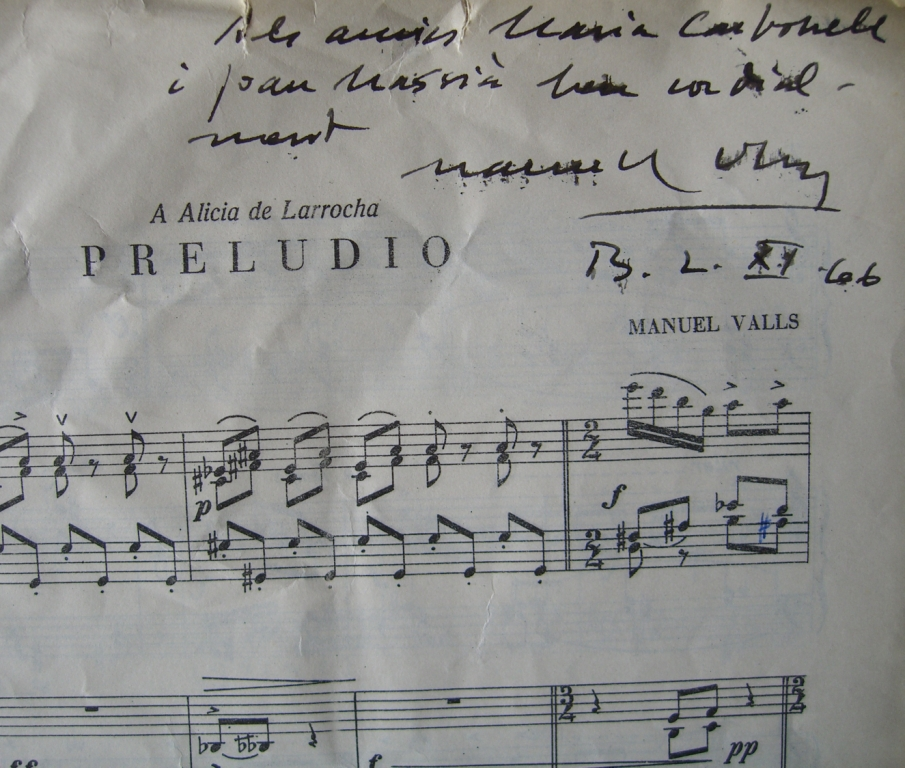

Manuel Valls i Gorina (Catalan pronunciation: [mənuˈɛl ˈβaʎs]; 21 July 1920 – 1984) was a Catalan composer, pianist, music critic, and music educator.

Valls was born in Badalona. He was a first cousin of painter Xavier Valls, himself the father of former French Prime Minister Manuel Valls. He studied at the University of Barcelona and the Conservatori Superior de Música del Liceu. At the Liceu he was mentored by Aita Donostia with whom he studied music theory, music composition, and orchestration. He became a successful composer writing symphonic works, chamber music, choral music, operas, art songs, and songs for solo piano. For many years he taught composition at the University of Barcelona and wrote music reviews for El País. He died in Barcelona.

Personal papers of Manuel Valls i Gorina are preserved in the Biblioteca de Catalunya.

Manuel Valls is the composer of the music of "El Cant del Barça", the official anthem of FC Barcelona.

== Selected works ==
- Estudio de danza en 5/8
- Preludio para piano
- Concierto de guitarra y orquesta
- Tocata per a piano
- Seis canciones del Alto Duero para voz y piano
- Fantasías en forma de concierto para flauta solista y cuerda
- La Mare de Déu (SATB chorus)
- Poemes de Patrícia: Renaixença, Món, Nit (SATB chorus)
- Primera historia de Esther (1955 opera)
- CAL 33-33, o El bon samaritá (1967 opera)

== Sources ==
- Música de tota mena. Barcelona, ed. Clivis, 1982. ISBN 84-85927-04-4.
