= Maristany =

Maristany is a surname. Notable people with the surname include:

- Fèlix Millet i Maristany (1903–1967), Spanish financier, patron of the arts, and cultural activist
- Guiomar Maristany (born 1999), Spanish tennis player
- Hiram Maristany (1945–2022), Nuyorican American photographer
