= En concert à l'Olympia =

Live album by Hélène Ségara
- Released: October 2001
- Recorded: France
- Genre: Pop
- Length: 1:47:08
- Label: Warner Music France

Hélène Ségara chronology
Au Nom d'une Femme (2000)	En concert à l'Olympia (2001)	Hélène (2002)

En concert à l'Olympia is the first live album recorded by the French singer Hélène Ségara, and her third overall. It was released in October 2001, and was available first as a box set containing two CDs, then as a DVD. It achieved success in the countries where it was released.

The two CDs were recorded during the singer's first tour which led her at the Olympia of Paris from 23 to 26 October 2000. This live album contains songs from Ségara's first two albums, Cœur de verre and Au Nom d'une Femme, two songs from the musical Notre Dame de Paris in which Ségara portrayed Esméralda, and five tracks as bonus which are cover versions of Ségara's hits in Spanish-language, whose texts were written by the Spanish singer and songwriter Nilda Fernandez.

== Track listing ==
First CD

#	Title	Length
1.	"Mes Rêves disaient la vérité" (M.Jourdan / N.Kaniel)	5:08
2.	"Les Vallées d'Irlande" (A.Nacash - N.Godsend / M.Nacash - N.Hardt)	5:06
3.	"Mrs Jones" (C.Vié / C.Loigerot)	3:40
4.	"Les Larmes" (M.Valmur / T.Geoffroy - C.Loigerot)	6:12
5.	"Conga" (E.Garcia)	3:04
6.	"Je vous aime adieu" (H.Ségara - C.Vié / T.Geoffroy - C.Loigerot)	4:19
7.	"Parlez-moi de nous" (H.Ségara / M.Nacash - N.Godsend)	4:20
8.	"Loin du froid de décembre" (L.Ahrens / S.Flaherty)	3:23
9.	"Elle, tu l'aimes..." (F.Brito / F.Trinidate) Adaptation : M.Jourdan	4:27
10.	"Upside Down" (N.Rodgers - B.Edwards)	3:31
11.	"Auprès de ceux que j'aimais" (J.P.Lang / T.Geoffroy - C.Loigerot)	4:22

Second CD

#	Title	Length
1.	"Vivre" (L.Plamondon / R.Cocciante)	6:52
2.	"Vivo per lei (je vis pour elle)" (Duet with Bruno Pelletier) (V.Zelli - M.Mengali - G.Panceri - M.Jourdan)	4:32
3.	"Au Nom d'une Femme" (J.D'Aime / C.Bros)	4:05
4.	"Il y a trop de gens qui t'aiment" (C.Vié / T.Geoffroy)	4:50
5.	Presentation of the musicians	8:34
6.	"Ave Maria païen" (L.Plamondon / R.Cocciante)	6:04
7.	"Il y a trop de gens qui t'aiment" (With the audience) (C.Vié / T.Geoffroy)	4:13
8.	"Me vas a dejar" ("Tu vas me quitter") (L.Deck / C.Loigerot - T.Goeffroy) Translation : N.Fernandez	4:06
9.	"Espera la lluvia" ("Il attend la pluie") (C.Vié / T.Geoffroy) Translation : N.Fernandez	4:20
10.	"Para una mujer" ("Au Nom d'une Femme") (J.D'Aime / C.Bros) Translation : N.Fernandez	4:03
11.	"Habla por favor" ("Parlez-moi de nous") (H.Ségara / M.Nacash - N.Godsend) Translation : N.Fernandez	4:03
12	"Yo lo Siento per mi" ("Il y a trop de gens qui t'aiment") (C.Vié / T.Geoffroy) Translation : N.Fernandez	3:45

== Credits ==
- Production and management : Orlando
- Artistic director (BG Productions) : Antoine Angelelli
- Original arrangements : Michel Coeuriot and Sandro Abaldonato
- Arrangements : Michel Coeuriot
- Musicians :
  - Bass : David Lefèvre
  - Drum kit : Régis Cecarelli
  - Keyboards : Frédéric Gaillardet, Cyril Barbessol
  - Guitars : Thomas Coeuriot
  - Chorister percussion : Dany Vasnier
  - Chorister : Marie Do Luce
- Track 10, CD 2 :
  - Made by Pascal Obispo and P.Jaconelli
  - Strings arrangements : M.Coeuriot
  - Recordings and mixings : S.Forward (Studio Plus XXX) and S.Briand (Studio Guillaume Tell)

== Charts and sales ==
=== Peak positions ===
Chart (2001/02)	Peak position
Belgian (Wallonia) Albums Chart	11
French Albums Chart	4
Swiss Albums Chart	40

=== Year-end charts ===
Chart (2001)	Position
French Albums Chart	70

=== Certifications ===
Region	Certification	Certified units/sales
France (SNEP)	Gold	100,000^{*}
^{*} Sales figures based on certification alone.
