= Le Best Of =

Le Best of

Greatest hits album by Hélène Ségara
- Released: November 26, 2004
- Genre: Pop
- Label: East West; Warner Music

Hélène Ségara chronology
Humaine (2003)	Le Best of (2004)	Quand l'éternité... (2006)

Singles from Le Best of
- 1. "Ailleurs comme ici" Released: February 2005

Le Best of (also titled Ailleurs comme ici) is the name of the first compilation recorded by the French singer Hélène Ségara. It contains all Ségara's songs previously released as singles from her previous three albums (except "Au Nom d'une Femme" and the promotional singles), including the duets with Andrea Bocelli and Laura Pausini, plus three new songs, "Ailleurs comme ici", which was the only single from this album, "Je t'aimerai" and "Ne me laisse jamais partir". Released on November 26, 2004, Ailleurs comme ici was a moderate success in the three countries in which it was charted, in comparison with Ségara's previous albums.

== Track listing ==
#	Title	Length
1.	"Ailleurs comme ici" (B. Homs / A. Lanty)	3:59
2.	"Il y a trop de gens qui t'aiment" (C. Vié / T. Geoffroy)	4:25
3.	"L'Amour est un soleil" (L. Plamondon / R. Musurrama - R. Zaneli)	4:05
4.	"Elle, tu l'aimes..." (F. Brito / F. Trinidade)	5:05
5.	"Parlez-moi de nous" (H. Ségara / M. Nacash - N. Godsend)	4:02
6.	"Je t'aimerai" (H. Segara / C. Loigerot)	3:26
7.	"On n'oublie jamais rien, on vit avec" (Duet with Laura Pausini) (B. Grimaldi - G. Capaldi - A. Angelelli / B. Grimaldi - G. Capaldi - A. Angelelli)	5:07
8.	"Vivre" (L. Plamondon / R. Cocciante)	3:52
9.	"Encore une fois" (M. Nacash - A. Nacash / M. Nacash)	3:57
10.	"Tu vas me quitter" (L. Deck / C. Loigerot - T. Geoffroy)	4:06
11.	"Vivo per lei (je vis pour elle)" (Duet with Andrea Bocelli) (V. Zelli - M. Mengali - G. Panceri - M.Jourdan)	4:25
12.	"Ne me laisse jamais partir" (H. Segara - S. Lebel / C. Loigerot)	3:32
13.	"Les Vallées d'Irlande" (A. Nacash - N. Godsend / M. Nacash - N. Hardt)	3:42
14.	"Petite Vie" (H. Ségara - J. Daroy / C. Loigerot)	4:13
15.	"On ne dit pas" (H. Ségara / P. Souchon)	3:37
16.	"Loin du froid de décembre" (L. Ahrens / S. Flaherty) Adep. P. Videcoq / É. Gruninger	3:28
17.	"Je vous aime adieu" (H. Ségara - V. Vié / T. Geoffroy - C. Loigerot)	3:51
18.	"Humaine" (S. Lebel / C. Loigerot)	5:29

== Charts ==
=== Weekly charts ===
Chart (2004–2005)	Peak position
Belgian (Wallonia) Albums Chart	13
French Albums Chart	11
Swiss Albums Chart	49

=== Year-end charts ===
Chart (2005)	Position
Belgian (Wallonia) Albums Chart	70

== Certifications and sales ==
Region	Certification	Certified units/sales
France (SNEP)	Gold	100,000^{*}
^{*} Sales figures based on certification alone.
