= On n'oublie jamais rien, on vit avec =

Single by Hélène Ségara and Laura Pausini

from the album Humaine
- B-side: "L'Île de nous"
- Released: November 2003
- Recorded: 2003
- Genre: Pop
- Length: 4:20
- Label: East West, Warner Music
- Songwriter(s): Antoine Angelelli, Bruno Grimaldi, Gérard Capaldi
- Producer(s): Pierre Jaconelli

Hélène Ségara singles chronology
"Encore une fois" (2003)	"On n'oublie jamais rien, on vit avec" (2003)	"Humaine" (2004)

Laura Pausini singles chronology
"It's Not Goodbye" (2003)	"On n'oublie jamais rien, on vit avec" (2003)	"Resta in ascolto" (2004)

"On n'oublie jamais rien, on vit avec" (engl.: you'll never forget anything, you live with that) is a 2003 song recorded by French artist Hélène Ségara and Italian singer Laura Pausini. It was the third single from Ségara's third studio album, Humaine, on which it features as ninth track. Released in November 2003, the song was a success in France, Belgium and Switzerland, remaining to date one of the most successful single of both singers in terms of chartings.

== Background ==
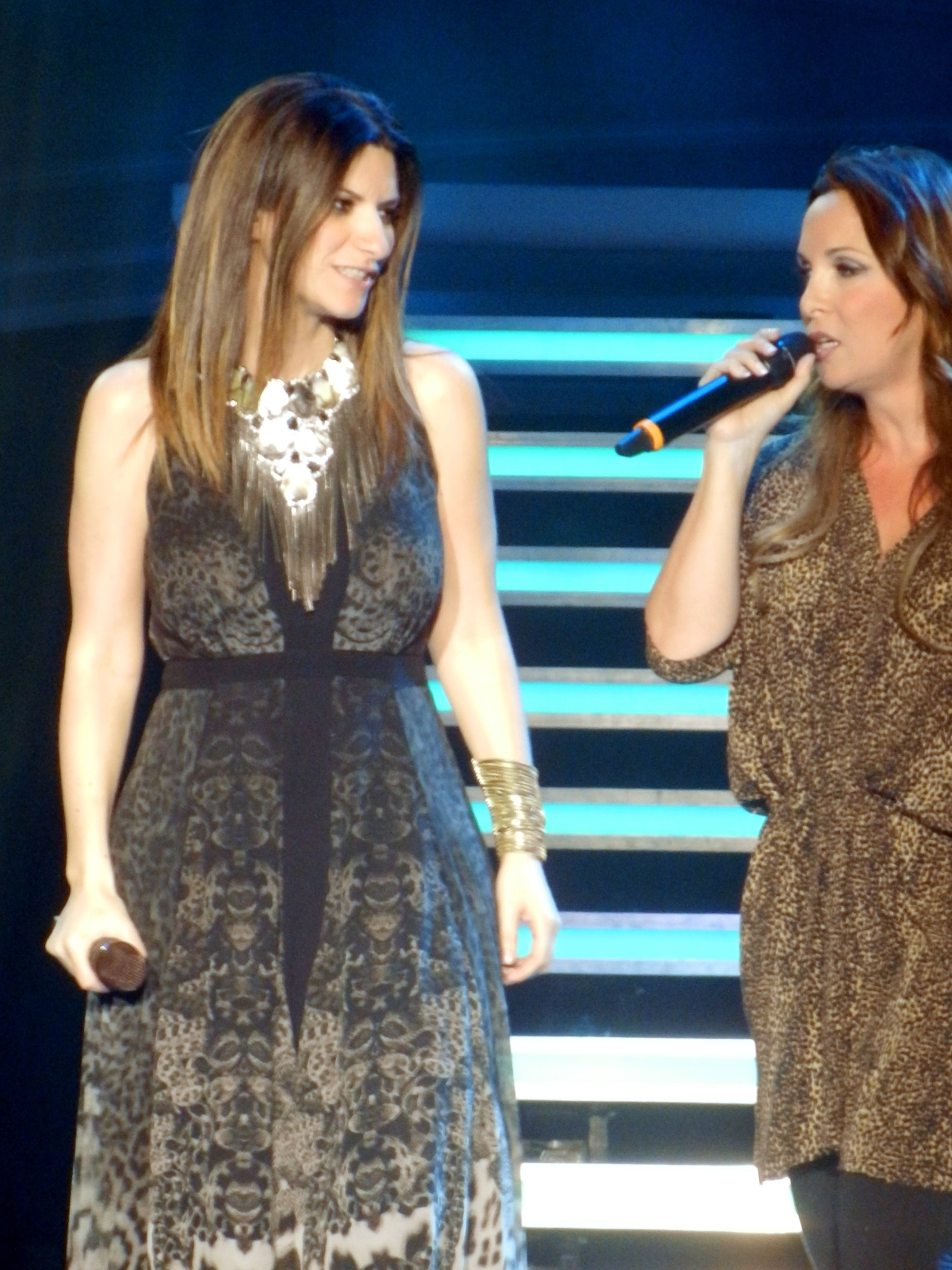
Pausini and Ségara performing the song

When Humaine was recorded, Orlando wanted the album to contain a duet. He asked the Italian singer to participate in the vocal duet "On n'oublie jamais rien, on vit avec", and the two women met in 2003 for the recording. Italian lyrics of the song, "Per vivere il ricordo che ho di noi", were written by Laura Pausini.

Written and composed by Antoine Angelelli, Bruno Grimaldi and Gérard Capaldi, the song was the second multilingual duet for Ségara, after "Vivo per lei (je vis pour elle)" with Andrea Bocelli in 1996. As for this previous duet, the song mixes French (sung by Ségara) and Italian lyrics (sung by Pausini). This is a ballad pop which deals with love.

The song was also available on Ségara's best of just entitled Le Best of. It was included on many French compilations : Duos d'aujourd'hui, Girls 2004, NRJ Hit Music Only, NRJ Hit Music Only, Les Plus Belles Voix 3, released in 2004, and Vos Plus Belles Émotions (2005). It was also the third track on Ségara's 2004 CD single for "On ne dit pas".

Both singers performed the song in duet during the NRJ Music Awards in January 2004.

On April 13, 2012, Ségara joined Pausini as part of her Inedito World Tour and both sang the song.

== Chart performance ==
"On n'oublie jamais rien, on vit avec" started at number 77 on 23 November 2003, on the French Singles Chart, a few days before its official release, then jumped to number three and reached this position for three nonconsecutive weeks, remaining behind "L'Orange", "Shut Up", and "Si demain... (Turn Around)", which were successively atop. It remained in the top ten for 15 weeks, 24 weeks in the top 50 and 30 weeks on the chart. Certified Gold disc, the song was the 17th best-selling single of 2004. As of August 2014, it is the 50th best-selling single of the 21st century in France, with 399,000 units sold.

In Belgium (Wallonia), the single featured on the chart for 23 weeks in the top 40, 15 of them in the top ten. It appeared at number 14 on 13 December and climbed to number three the week after. It peaked at number two on 7 February and remained there for three consecutive weeks, behind another female duet, Bonnie Tyler and Kareen Antonn, with their hit "Si demain... (Turn Around)". "On n'oublie, jamais rien, on vit avec" was certified Gold disc, and ranked at number eight on the year-end chart.

In Switzerland, the single had a 26-week chart trajectory. It debuted at number 12 and reached number three in its fifth and sixth weeks, spending nine weeks in the top ten and 21 weeks in the top 50. It was the 20th best-selling single of the year in that country.

== Track listings ==
CD single

No.	Title	Length
1.	"On n'oublie jamais rien, on vit avec"	4:20
2.	"L'Île de nous"	4:15

Digital download

No.	Title	Length
1.	"On n'oublie jamais rien, on vit avec"	4:20

== Personnel ==
- Lyrics and music by Bruno Grimaldi, Gérard Capaldi and Antoine Angelelli, except the text in Italian-language by Laura Pausini
- Arrangements: Pierre Jaconelli
- Keyboards programmations: Sébastien Cortella
- Guitars: Pierre Jaconelli
- Drum kit: Ian Thomas
- Bass: Nicolas Fiszman
- Percussion: Denis Benarrosh
- Strings direction: Khalil Chahine
- Strings: Les Archers de Paris
- Orchestral direction: Philippe Nadal
- Violin: Christian Guiot
- Recording and mixing: Peter Schwier at Studio Mega C / Guillaume Tell Studio
- Laura Pausini's voice recorded by Gabriele Gigli at Logic Studio (Milan)
- Edited by Bambino / Gente Edizioni / Music Sharpe Edizioni

== Charts ==
=== Weekly charts ===
Weekly charts for "On n'oublie jamais rien, on vit avec"
Chart (2003–2004)	Peak position
Belgium (Ultratop 50 Wallonia)	2
France (SNEP)	3
France Airplay (SNEP)	19
Switzerland (Schweizer Hitparade)	3

=== Year-end charts ===
Year-end charts for "On n'oublie jamais rien, on vit avec"
Chart (2003)	Position
France (SNEP)	55

Chart (2004)	Position
Belgium (Ultratop 50 Wallonia)	8
France (SNEP)	17
Switzerland (Schweizer Hitparade)	20

=== Certifications ===
Certifications for "On n'oublie jamais rien, on vit avec"
Region	Certification	Certified units/sales
Belgium (BRMA)	Gold	25,000^{*}
France (SNEP)	Gold	399,000
^{*} Sales figures based on certification alone.
