= L'Exigence =

- First edition
- Authors: Manuel Valls
- Language: French
- Subject: French politics, Terrorism
- Genre: non-fiction
- Publisher: Éditions Grasset
- Publication date: 2016
- Publication place: France
- Pages: 96
- ISBN: 978-2-246-86130-0 (Paperback)

L'Exigence is a 2016 political book about terrorism authored by Manuel Valls, the Prime Minister of France. All proceeds go to the victims of the November 2015 Paris attacks.

== Content ==
The book comprises a preface authored by Prime Minister Valls, followed by the two speeches he gave before the National Assembly on January 7, 2015 and November 13, 2015. The main theme is terrorism.

== Promotional efforts ==
Prime Minister Valls promoted the book on On n'est pas couché, a French television programme on France 2, on January 16, 2016.
