= Judy Weiss =

German singer (born 1972)

Judy Weiss (born 31 May 1972 in Berlin) is a German singer who became internationally renowned after singing "Vivo per Lei" with Andrea Bocelli in a German-Italian duet in 1996. Weiss sang in German, while Bocelli sang in Italian.

In 1994, she starred for the first time in a musical in the role of Anita in West Side Story. In 1995, she performed in Beauty and the Beast. She also played Macchina in the German musical Space Dream and Esmeralda in The Hunchback of Notre Dame. She performs regularly with the jazz pianist Maria Baptist.

Weiss took her first piano lessons at the age of five. For eight years, she attended a conservatory for piano and singing, and afterwards the Music Academy Hanns Eisler. Weiss has a daughter who was born in November 2000.
