= Xavier Valls =

Spanish painter (1923–2006)

- Born: Francesc Xavier Valls Subirà; 18 September 1923; Barcelona, Spain
- Died: 16 September 2006 (aged 82); Barcelona, Spain
- Occupation: Painter
- Spouse: Luisangela Galfetti (m. 1958)
- Children: 2, including Manuel
- Relatives: Aurelio Galfetti (brother-in-law)

Francesc Xavier Valls Subirà (18 September 1923 – 16 September 2006) was a Spanish painter who lived in Paris most of his life. He specialised in still lifes. His work can be found in museums in Spain. He was the father of former French Prime Minister Manuel Valls.

== Early life ==
Xavier Valls was born on 18 September 1923 in Barcelona, Spain. His father, Magí Valls, served on the editorial board of El Matí, a Catholic Catalan newspaper.

He learned the visual arts from the Swiss sculptor Charles Collet and the Spanish painter Jaume Busquets in the 1930s.

== Career ==
Valls started his career as a designer for Ramon Sunyer, a jeweller. He then worked for architects Lluís Bonet Garí, Isidre Puig Boada and Francesc Folguera i Grassi as well as designer Santiago Marco.

In 1946, he was a co-founder of the Cercle Maillol at the French Institute of Barcelona with Charles Collet, Suzanne Alemany, Alfred Figueras and Bernard Sanjuan.

He moved to Paris in 1949 thanks to a scholarship from the French Institute of Barcelona, and decided to stay. By 1953, his paintings were exhibited at the Salon d'Automne. Meanwhile, he worked with Fernand Léger on stained glass designs. His work was exhibited in the art galleries of art dealers Henriette Gomès and Claude Bernard.

He was the recipient of the Prix Drouant in 1980. A year later, in 1981, the Musée Ingres in Montauban organised an exhibition solely about his work. Three years later, in 1984, the Museo de Arte Moderno in Madrid added his 1974 painting, Pêches et pichet to their collection. He became an Officer of the Ordre des Arts et des Lettres in 1989.

In 2003 he published his memoirs under the title La meva capsa de Pandora ("My Pandora's box").

== Personal life ==
He married Luisangela Galfetti in 1958. Four years later, in 1962, they had two children: Manuel Valls, who has served as the Prime Minister of France since 2014; and Giovanna Valls. Although they lived in Paris, they summered in Barcelona every year.

== Death ==
He died of colon cancer in Barcelona in 2006. He was only diagnosed one month before his death. He was eighty-two years old.

== Posthumously ==
Three of his paintings were auctioned by Christie's in London in 2009.
