= Manuel Valls =

Prime Minister of France from 2014 to 2016

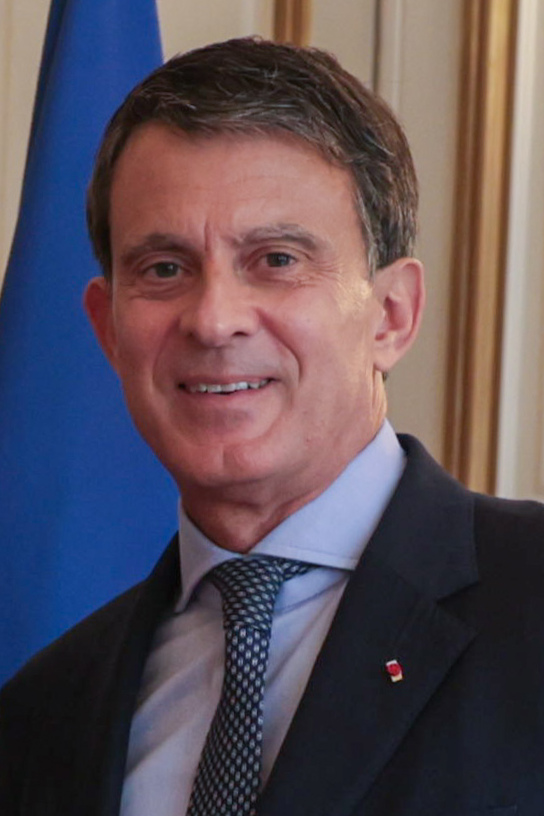
- Valls in 2025

Prime Minister of France
- In office 31 March 2014 – 6 December 2016
- President: François Hollande
- Preceded by: Jean-Marc Ayrault
- Succeeded by: Bernard Cazeneuve

Minister of State Minister of the Overseas
- In office 23 December 2024 – 12 October 2025
- Prime Minister: François Bayrou; Sébastien Lecornu
- Preceded by: François-Noël Buffet
- Succeeded by: Naïma Moutchou

Minister of the Interior
- In office 16 May 2012 – 1 April 2014
- Prime Minister: Jean-Marc Ayrault
- Preceded by: Claude Guéant
- Succeeded by: Bernard Cazeneuve

Mayor of Évry
- In office 18 March 2001 – 24 May 2012
- Preceded by: Christian Olivier
- Succeeded by: Francis Chouat

Member of the National Assembly for Essonne's 1st constituency
- In office 19 June 2002 – 3 October 2018
- Preceded by: Jacques Guyard
- Succeeded by: Francis Chouat

Member of the Barcelona City Council
- In office 15 June 2019 – 31 August 2021

Member of the Regional Council of Île-de-France
- In office 21 March 1986 – 20 June 2002
- Constituency: Essonne

Personal details
- Born: Manuel Carlos Valls Galfetti; 13 August 1962 (age 64) Barcelona, Catalonia, Spain
- Citizenship: Spain (1962–1982; since 2018); France (since 1982)
- Party: France; LREM/RE (2021–present)
- Other political affiliations: France PS (1980–2017); Spain BCN (2019–2021)
- Spouses: Nathalie Soulié (m. 1987, divorced); Anne Gravoin (m. 2010; div. 2018); Susana Gallardo (m. 2019)
- Children: 4
- Parent: Xavier Valls (father)
- Relatives: Aurelio Galfetti (uncle); Manuel Valls i Gorina (cousin)
- Education: Pantheon-Sorbonne University

Manuel Carlos Valls Galfetti (Note: French: [manɥɛl kaʁlos vals ɡalfɛti]; Catalan: [mənuˈɛl ˈkaɾloz ˈbaʎz ɡalˈfeti]; Spanish: [maˈnwel ˈkaɾlos ˈβals ɣalˈfeti]) (born 13 August 1962) is a French–Spanish politician who served as Minister of the Overseas in the Bayrou government and first Lecornu government from 2024 to 2025. He served as Prime Minister of France from 2014 until 2016 under President François Hollande and was also involved in Spanish politics from 2018 to 2021.

Born in Barcelona to a Spanish father and a Swiss mother, Valls grew up in France. He was Mayor of Évry from 2001 to 2012 and was first elected to the National Assembly of France for Essonne in 2002. He was regarded as belonging to the Socialist Party's social liberal wing, sharing common orientations with Blairism. He was Minister of the Interior from 2012 to 2014 and Prime Minister from 2014 to 2016. He was a candidate in the Socialist Party primary for the 2017 French presidential election, losing the Socialist nomination in the second round to Benoît Hamon. Following his defeat, he endorsed Emmanuel Macron despite having previously pledged to support the Socialist candidate.

In the 2017 French legislative election, Valls was re-elected by a narrow margin as a Member of Parliament. He then left the Socialist Party and joined La République En Marche group (LREM) in the National Assembly, although he did not formally join the party. In October 2018, he resigned from the National Assembly to run for mayor of Barcelona in the 2019 election. Valls failed to be elected mayor, coming in fourth in the election. He served as a Barcelona city councillor until 2021.

In 2022, Valls attempted to return to the French National Assembly as a member of LREM for the fifth constituency for French citizens abroad but was unsuccessful, coming third in the vote.

In December 2024, he returned to the French Government as Minister in charge of Overseas France.

== Early life and family ==
Valls' paternal grandfather was the editor-in-chief of a Republican newspaper in Spain. During the Spanish Civil War, he sheltered priests who were fleeing from the Red Terror. After Francisco Franco's victory, he was forced out of his job as editor. Valls' father was the Barcelona-born painter Xavier Valls (1923–2006).

In the late 1940s, Xavier Valls moved to Paris and met his future wife, Luisangela Galfetti, a Ticino-born Swiss citizen, the sister of architect Aurelio Galfetti. In 1955, he won the prize for best still life in the third Spanish-American Art Biennial inaugurated by Franco. Valls was born in Barcelona while his parents were there on holiday. He grew up with them at their home in France and became naturalized as French.

== Political career ==
=== Rise in the Socialist Party (1980–2014) ===
In 1980, aged 17, Valls joined the French Socialist Party (PS) to support Michel Rocard. Within the PS, he defended the "Second Left" (La Deuxième gauche), rather than the more pragmatic left of François Mitterrand. (The Second left could be compared to the 1960s "New Left" – opposed to party lines and bureaucracy, anti-statist, supportive of anti-colonialist and anti-imperialist movements worldwide, favouring direct action politics.) While studying history at the Pantheon-Sorbonne University, Tolbiac campus, he was a member of the UNEF-ID, a progressive students' union.

In 1980, he met two other student supporters of Rocard with whom he became close friends: Alain Bauer (Bauer is the godfather of Valls' second son), and Stéphane Fouks.

From 1983 to 1986, Valls was a parliamentary attaché for the member for Ardèche, Robert Chapuis. In 1986 he was elected to the regional Council for the Île-de-France and served until 1992. In 1988, he became head of the Socialist Party in Argenteuil-Bezons and deputy mayor. From 1988 to 1991 he was responsible for the functioning of the prime minister's cabinet. From 1991 to 1993 he was an inter-ministerial delegate to the 1992 Winter Olympics in Albertville. In 1995, he became the Secretary of Communications for the national Socialist Party and in 1997 communications and media relations chief for the prime minister's Cabinet. In 1998 he was elected vice-president of the regional council for Île-de-France, a post which he held until 2002. While vice-president of the regional Council, he was also elected mayor of Évry in 2001, a post he held until 2012. In 2002, he became the deputy for the First Electoral District in Essonne and in 2008, the president of the tri-city jurisdiction of Évry-Centre-Essonne.

In the 2008 elections to choose the head of the Socialist Party, Valls supported the former presidential candidate Ségolène Royal over her former partner François Hollande; Hollande eventually won.

On 13 June 2009, Valls announced his intention to run in the Socialist presidential primary in 2011 for the 2012 election. On 30 June 2009 he founded a political organisation with the slogan "The Left Needs Optimism," to provide legal and financial support the Socialist Primary candidates.

On 7 June 2011, he confirmed his candidacy for the Socialist primary. On the evening of the first primary round, 9 October 2011, Valls achieved only 6% of the vote, just behind Ségolène Royal. He was therefore eliminated. On the night of his defeat, he endorsed François Hollande for the second round.

=== Minister of the Interior (2012–2014) ===
Valls was appointed Minister of the Interior in the Ayrault Cabinet in May 2012.

Ahead of the Socialist Party's 2012 convention in Toulouse, Valls endorsed Harlem Désir as candidate to succeed Martine Aubry at the party's leadership.

=== Prime Minister of France (2014–2016) ===
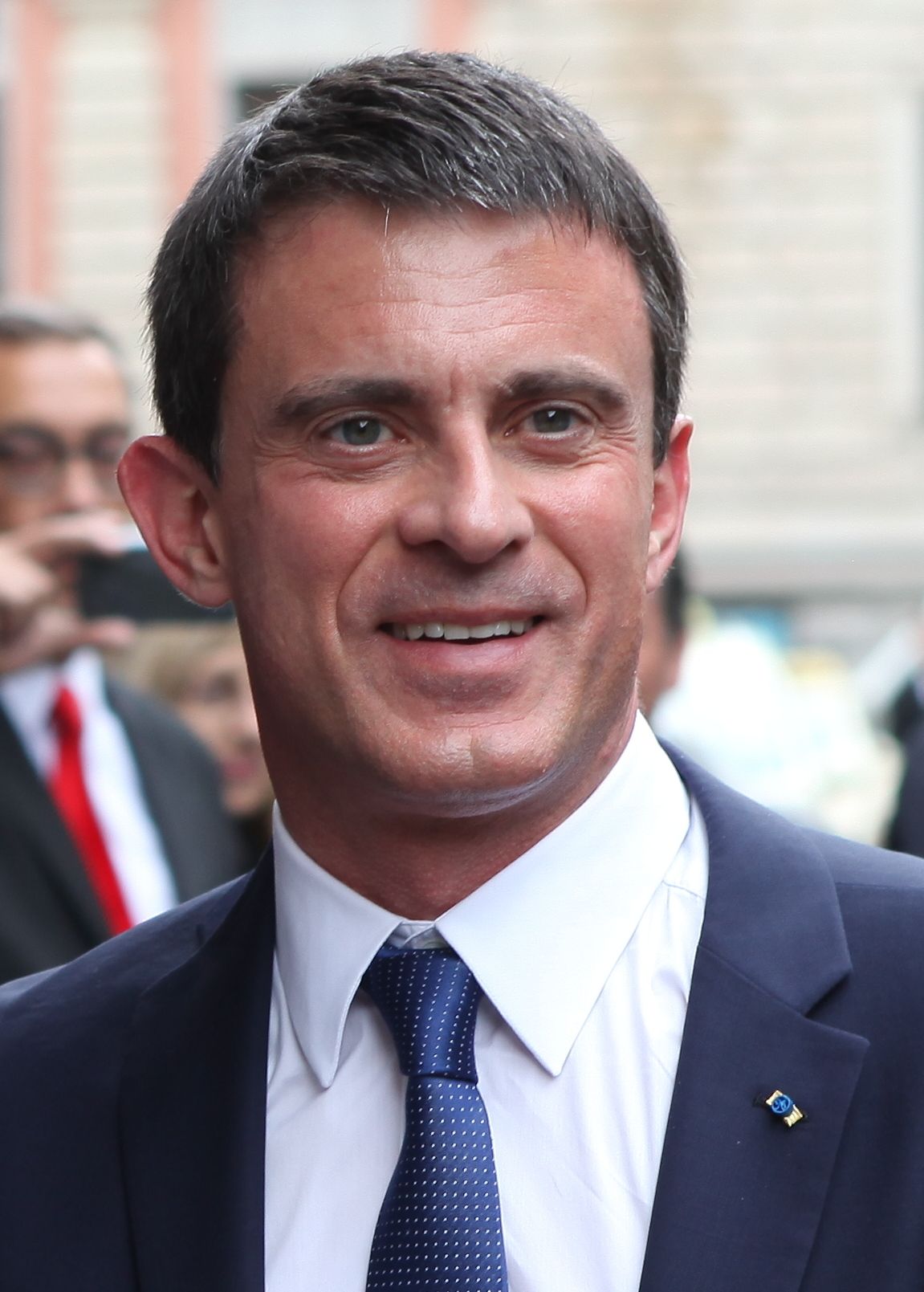
Valls in 2015.

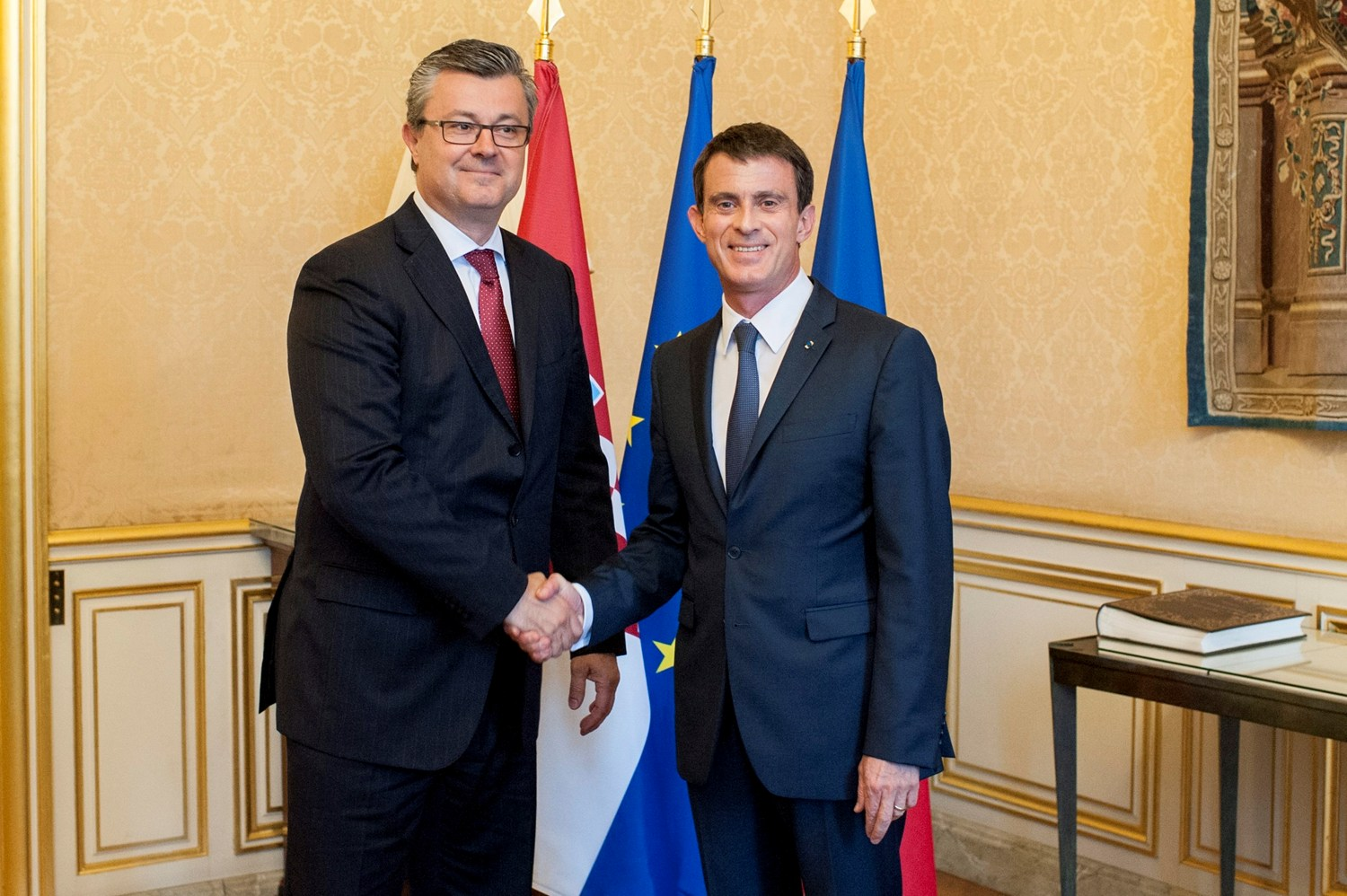
Valls with Croatian Prime Minister Tihomir Orešković in Paris

In March 2014, following major losses to centre-right and extreme-right political parties in French municipal elections, President François Hollande appointed Valls to the post of Prime Minister. He replaced Jean-Marc Ayrault who had resigned earlier that day. The Valls Cabinet was formed on 2 April 2014, consisting of 15 ministers from the Socialist Party and two ministers from the Radical Party of the Left.

After the 2016 Nice truck attack, he was criticised for saying that "France will have to live with terrorism." French citizens booed him when he joined the memorial for the victims, yelling "murderer" and "resign" at him before the minute of silence for the dead began.

=== Post-premiership (2016–present) ===
==== 2017 presidential election ====
Valls left office on 6 December 2016 to run in the 2017 French Socialist Party presidential primary ahead of the 2017 French presidential election. He was replaced by Minister of the Interior Bernard Cazeneuve. He came in second during the first round of the primary on 22 January, behind his ex-Minister of National Education Benoît Hamon. The two candidates advanced to the second round, which was held 29 January. Valls was unexpectedly defeated in the second round, garnering 41% of the vote to Hamon's 58%. Despite subsequently promising to support Hamon's candidature, Valls later declared his support for Emmanuel Macron of En Marche!.

After his loss in the Socialist Party primary, Valls refused to endorse Benoît Hamon, citing the difference in views. In March, Valls announced on BFMTV that he was endorsing Emmanuel Macron.

After Macron's win in the second round of the presidential election, Valls announced that he wanted to run for reelection to the National Assembly under the En Marche! banner, declaring that the Socialist Party was "dead". The Socialist Party has started disciplinary proceedings against Valls, perhaps resulting in his expulsion. En Marche! rejected Valls's application to join but said it would not oppose him in the 2017 French legislative election. Valls won reelection as an independent with 50.3% of the vote in the second round, but the result was challenged by his opponent, Farida Amrani of La France Insoumise.

==== Involvement in Spanish politics ====
In April 2018, it was reported that Valls was considering an offer to run as a candidate for mayor of Barcelona under the banner of Citizens. On 25 September 2018, Valls announced his candidacy in the 2019 election and declared that he was resigning all political responsibilities in France. On 28 March 2019, he registered his own political party of municipal scope, Barcelona pel Canvi (BCN Canvi).

Valls notably opposed the Catalan independence movement. As his candidacy was supported by the anti-separatist and liberal Citizens, the electoral list for the municipal election (named "Barcelona pel Canvi–Ciutadans") included members of Citizens and obtained 6 seats (out of 41) at the ballots.

Valls, along the other 2 municipal councillors elected in the Barcelona pel Canvi–Ciutadans list who were not members of Citizens–Party of the Citizenry (Celestino Corbacho and Eva Parera), gave an "unconditional" vote to Ada Colau in the investiture of the Mayor of Barcelona, with the sole purpose of preventing separatist Ernest Maragall becoming Mayor. Days later, Cs announced the breakup of their alliance with Valls, and their will to form their own municipal group, to which Corbacho also joined later. Valls had been critical of the Cs' strategy mastered by party leader Albert Rivera, after the rapprochement of Cs with the far-right Vox, and he later pointed out that (teaming up) "with Vox you end up dirtying your hands and, in some ways, your soul".

In August 2021, Valls announced that he would resign from the City Council of Barcelona and return to French politics.

==== Return to French politics ====
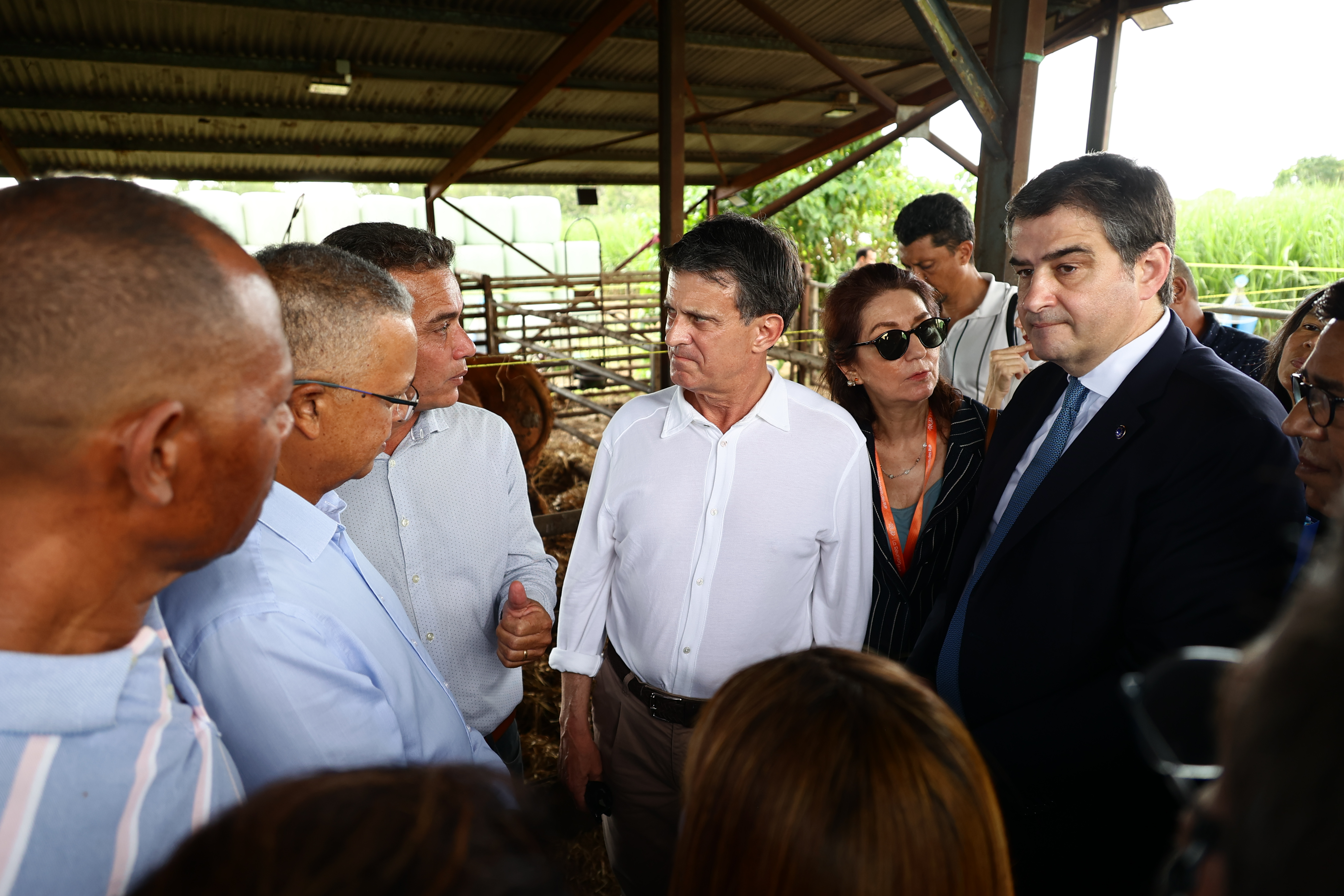
Manuel Valls visiting La Réunion in 2025, with Vice-President of the European Commission Raffaele Fitto.

After Emmanuel Macron's 2022 reelection, Valls was invested by La République En Marche for the legislative election in the fifth French legislative constituency for citizens abroad. However, Stéphane Vojetta, incumbent Macronist MP, refused to make way for him. Vojetta was eventually reelected, while Valls came in third with 15,8 % of the vote.

In December 2024, Valls was named minister of Overseas territories and minister of State in François Bayrou's government. On 30 December, he and the Prime minister visited Mayotte to assess the damages of Cyclone Chido and to announce a series of measure addressing that department's crisis.

== Political beliefs ==
Valls was viewed as on the right wing of the Socialist Party, with a similar approach to the German and Dutch social democratic parties. During the 2011 presidential primary, he defined himself as "Blairiste" or "Clintonien", and described his position as "in the tradition of Pierre Mendès France, Lionel Jospin and Michel Rocard". As prime minister, he agreed with being compared to Italian prime minister Matteo Renzi, an adherent to the centrist Third Way ideology.

Valls advocates an "economically realistic" political speech without "demagoguery". He voices his dissent in the party by his vision of individual responsibilities ("The new hope that the Left must carry is individual self-realization: to allow everyone to become that which they are") and his positions against a system where some people live only from national solidarity. Describing himself as "reformist rather than revolutionary," he wants to "reconcile the left to the liberal approach".

=== Immigration ===
In his book To Put the Old Socialism to Rest ... And Finally be Left-Wing, he declared support for immigration "quotas".

In June 2009, while visiting a market in Évry, of which he was then mayor, he was caught on camera suggesting that the presence of more white people would give a better image of the city.

In October 2013, his stance in the Dibrani case met with high public approval, with a global approval rate of 74% (57% approval rate from the left, and 89% from the right).

In May 2020, the French government was condemned by the Hirtu Case, a case that dates back to 2013 when Manuel Valls was Minister of the Interior of France. The European Court of Human Rights (ECHR) condemned the French government for the forced evacuation in April 2013 of a gypsy camp on the outskirts of Paris that had been set up there in October 2012 following the dismantling of a previous camp. The judgment states that Article 8 (right to respect for his private and family life, his home and his correspondence) and Article 13 (right have an effective remedy before a national authority notwithstanding) of the European Convention on Human Rights had been violated. Human Rights, and also ordered the French state to pay compensation of 7,000 euros for each of the plaintiffs for non-pecuniary damage, and 7,900 euros for legal costs.

In an interview with the right-wing magazine Valeurs actuelles in June 2020, he was asked about the death of Adama Traoré (a young Malian French man who died in custody after being apprehended by police), and Manuel Valls stated that "the logic of victimisation is reinforced by the links between the indigenist movement and part of the left" and that "the class struggle disappears in favour of confrontation, of war between 'races'". He also denied that one could speak of "white privilege" in France, contrasting it with the United States, and claiming that the French Republic had already abolished slavery in 1848 even though France did have a past in colonial history.

=== Retirement age ===
Valls supported the extension of the years of required pension-contribution to 41, as advocated and achieved by the Sarkozy administration. The extension means that due to the maximum mandatory retirement age of 62, only immigrants receiving the right to legally work around the age of 21 would be allowed to receive the pension to which they would have contributed throughout their careers. "The role of the Left is not to deny democratic changes, nor to hide the size of deficits ... The Left can advocate an à la carte pension system and increasing the pay-in period."

=== Views on religion ===
In 2002, as mayor of Évry, he opposed a branch of the national grocery store chain Franprix, located in a predominately Muslim neighbourhood, deciding to sell only halal-certified meat/products and products that do not contain alcohol.

As parliamentarian and interior minister, he took strong stances on secularism, supported crackdowns on the wearing of niqābs in public and defended a nursery which sacked an employee for demanding to wear one at work. He had harsh words for anti-gay marriage protesters. When Catholics protested against "Golgota Picnic", he supported the theatre director in the name of freedom of speech.

When Dieudonné's quenelle gesture became popular in 2013, Valls said he would consider "all legal means" to ban Dieudonné's "public meetings", given that he "addresses in an obvious and insufferable manner the memory of victims of the Holocaust." In July 2014, following violent anti-Israel protests in Paris, Valls denounced what he called a "new form of anti-Semitism".

=== Cannabis ===
On 12 October 2009, Valls expressed "total disagreement" with a proposal by Daniel Vaillant for decriminalisation or legalisation of cannabis. The plan involved depriving traffickers of a source of income. Valls argued, "The question of drugs that produce considerable damage in some neighbourhoods and nourish the underground economy, cannot be handled this way. There is a certain number of rules that cannot be removed."

=== Terrorism ===
Valls said after the 2015 Paris attacks that French society needed a "general mobilisation" against the appeal of "deadly" doctrines. After the 2016 Nice truck attack, Valls said, "Times have changed, and France is going to have to live with terrorism, and we must face this together and show our collective sang-froid. France is a great country and a great democracy and we will not allow ourselves to be destabilized." The comments on the Nice attack provoked criticism in France.

== Honours ==
=== National honours ===
- Grand Cross in the National Order of Merit (2016)
- Grand Officer of the Order of the Legion of Honour (2016)

=== Foreign honours ===
- Commander of the Order of Ouissam Alaouite (Morocco, 2011)
- Commander of the National Order of the Ivory Coast (Ivory Coast, 2013)
- Knight of the National Order of the Lion (Senegal, 2013)
- Grand Cross of the Order of Civil Merit (Spain, 2013)
- Honorary Knight Grand Cross of the Order of St Michael and St George (UK, 2014)
- Commander of the National Order of Mali (Mali, 2015)
- Grand Cross of the Order of Isabella the Catholic (Spain, 2015)
- Grand Cross of the Order of Merit (Senegal, 2016)

== Political offices ==
=== Governmental functions ===
- Prime Minister: 31 March 2014 to 6 December 2016
- Minister of Interior: May 2012 to March 2014

=== Elected offices ===
- City councillor of Barcelona: June 2019 to August 2021.
- Member of the National Assembly of France for Essonne (1st constituency): 2002–2018. Elected in 2002, re-elected in 2007 and 2012. He was replaced by his deputy Carlos Da Silva from 2012 to 2017.
- Vice-president of the Regional Council of Île-de-France: 1998–2002 (Resignation).
- Regional councillor of Île-de-France: 1986–2002 (Resignation).
- Mayor of Évry: 2001–2012 (Resignation). Re-elected in 2008.
- Municipal councillor of Évry: 2001–2018. Re-elected in 2008 and 2014
- Deputy-mayor of Argenteuil: 1989–1998 (Resignation).

== Personal life ==
In 1987, Valls married Nathalie Soulié, with whom he had 4 children before divorcing. On 1 July 2010, he married Anne Gravoin, a violinist and winner of the Conservatoire de Paris' prestigious Premier Prix for Violin and Chamber Orchestra. He met Susana Gallardo in Menorca; in August 2018 they began dating, and they married on 14 September 2019.

Owing to his family background, Valls is fluent in French, Spanish, Catalan and Italian, and is distantly related to the Marquesses del Bosch de Arés.

== Publications ==
- Malabard, Virginie; Valls, Manuel (2005). La laïcité en face: entretiens avec Virginie Malabard (in French). Paris: Éditions Desclée de Brouwer. ISBN 978-2-220-05645-6. OCLC 63177289.
- Valls, Manuel (2006). Les habits neufs de la gauche (in French). Paris: Laffont. ISBN 978-2-221-10315-9.
- ——— (2008). Pour en finir avec le vieux socialisme: et être enfin de gauche! (in French). Paris: R. Laffont. ISBN 978-2-221-11019-5.
- ——— (2010). Pouvoir. Les documents (in French). Paris: Stock. ISBN 978-2-234-06393-8.
- ——— (2011). Sécurité: la gauche peut tout changer (in French). Paris: Les éditions du Moment. ISBN 978-2-35417-118-6.
- ——— (2011). L'énergie du changement : Abécédaire optimiste (in French). Paris: Éditions Eyrolles. ISBN 978-2-74912-392-9.
- ——— (2016). L'Exigence (in French). Paris: Éditions Grasset. ISBN 9782221033777.
- ——— (2022). Zemmour, l'antirépublicain (in French). Paris: Éditions de l'Observatoire. ISBN 979-10-329-2527-0.

== Notes ==
Political offices
Preceded by Christian Olivier	Mayor of Évry; 2001–2012	Succeeded by Francis Chouat
Preceded by Claude Guéant	Minister of the Interior; 2012–2014	Succeeded by Bernard Cazeneuve
Preceded by Jean-Marc Ayrault	Prime Minister of France; 2014–2016	Succeeded by Bernard Cazeneuve
Order of precedence
Preceded by Jean-Marc Ayrault as former Prime Minister	Order of precedence of France; Former Prime Minister	Succeeded by Bernard Cazeneuve as former Prime Minister
