= Humaine =

Studio album by Hélène Ségara
- Released: March 2003
- Recorded: France
- Genre: Pop
- Label: Warner Music France
- Producer: Orlando

Hélène Ségara chronology
Hélène (2002)	Humaine (2003)	Le Best of (2004)

Singles from Humaine
- 1. "L'Amour est un soleil" Released: 11 April 2003; 2. "Encore une fois" Released: July 2003; 3. "On n'oublie jamais rien, on vit avec" Released: November 2003; 4. "Humaine" Released: 2004; 5. "On ne dit pas" Released: July 2004

Humaine is the name of the third studio album recorded by the French singer Hélène Ségara. It was released in March 2003, and had a smash success in France, Belgium (Wallonia) and Switzerland, reaching the top five in these countries.

== Background ==
For this third album, Ségara was surrounded by several songwriters and composers that had already worked for her on the two previous studio albums, such as the Nacash brothers and Christian Loigerot. Gioacchino Maurici, French singer Calogero's brother, participated in the music of "Regarde", Patrick Juvet composed that of "Je rêve", while Pierre Souchon, son of Alain Souchon, made that of "On ne dit pas". The song "Je n'oublie que toi" was entirely composed by famous French singer and songwriter Maxime Le Forestier.

Four of the five singles from this album were released as CD singles. "L'Amour est un soleil" (number two) and the duet with Laura Pausini "On n'oublie jamais rien, on vit avec" (number three) were certified Gold disc, while "Encore une fois" (number 32) and "On ne dit pas" (number 26) were less successful.

== Chart performances ==
In France, the album went straight to number one on 15 March 2003, and stayed there for another week. Then it dropped slowly on the chart until number 49, but reached again the top 20 on 3 August. It totaled eleven weeks in the top ten, 52 weeks in the top 50, 57 weeks in the top 50 and 68 weeks in the top 200. Certified double platinum, it was ranked number nine on the 2003 French Albums Chart. The album also charted for two weeks on the French Mid Price Albums Chart, peaking at number 24 on 3 June 2005.

In Belgium (Wallonia), Humaine started at number eight on 22 March and climbed to number three the week after. It remained for six weeks in the top ten and dropped quickly after its tenth weeks, but manage to stabilize in the low positions. It fell off the top 40 after 20 weeks. It was the 22nd best-selling album of 2003.

In Switzerland, the album featured on the chart (top 100) for 16 weeks, from 23 March 2003, including three weeks in the top ten and ten weeks in the top 50, and a peak at number five in the second week.

For the first and last time in Ségara's career, one of her albums charted in Finland : indeed, Humaine was number 16 in later 2003 and remained for 16 weeks in the top 40.

== Track listing ==
#	Title	Length
1.	"Humaine" (S.Lebel / C.Loigerot)	5:28
2.	"Encore une fois" (M.Nacash - A.Nacash / M.Nacash)	3:30
3.	"L'amour est un soleil" (L.Plamondon / R.Musurrama - R.Zaneli)	4:06
4.	"Elle rentrait de l'école" (S.Lebel / C.Loigerot)	4:14
5.	"Regarde" (L.Florence / G.Maurici - Michel Garamon)	3:49
6.	"On ne dit pas" (H.Ségara / P.Souchon)	3:36
7.	"L'Île de nous" (S.Lebel / C.Loigerot)	4:15
8.	"Petite Vie" (H.Ségara - J.Daroy / C.Loigerot)	4:15
9.	"On n'oublie jamais rien, on vit avec" (Duet with Laura Pausini) (B.Grimaldi - G.Capaldi - A.Angelelli / B.Grimaldi - G.Capaldi - A.Angelelli)	5:05
10.	"Ma vie tient en deux mots" (M.Jourdan / N.Kaniel - M.Jourdan)	3:09
11.	"Je n'oublie que toi" (M. LeForestier)	3:10
12	"Petites Douleurs" (H.Ségara / T.Geoffroy)	3:29
13	"Tant bien que mal" (C.Vié / E.De Lucas)	3:28
14	"Je rêve" (H.Ségara - M.Goudeau / P.Juvet)	3:57

== Credits ==
=== Technical personnel ===
- Arrangements : Pierre Jaconelli (2-4, 7, 9, 10), Khalil Chahine (1, 8, 12, 13), Calogero and Gioacchino (5), Jean-Felix Lalanne (11), Régis Ceccarelli (6), Gérard Capaldi (14)
- Keyboards programmation : Sébastien Cortella (2-4, 7, 9, 10), Celmar Engel (1, 8, 12, 13), Christophe Voisin (5), Jean-Félix Lalanne (11), Gérard Capaldi (14)
- Recording and mixings : Stéphane Briand at Studio Guillaume Tell (1, 5, 6, 8, 11-14); Peter Schwier at Studio Mega C / Studio Guillaume Tell (2-4, 7, 9, 10); Gabriele Gigli at Logic Studio, Milan (Pausini's voice on 9)
- Assistants : Vincent Chevalot, Pierre Brien, Élise Chambeyron (Mega)
- Mastering : Tony Cousins Metropolis (London)
- Chargés of production : Sébastien Pernice, Philippe Tessier
- Photos : Klaus Roethlibsberger (D.Taranto for Jet Set)
- Design : Henry Neu for COM'N.B
- Make up : Morgan Quere
- Hairdresser : Gaby Baldinho
- Artistic director : Antoine Angelelli
- Production : Orlando for BG

=== Musician ===
- Guitars : Pierre Jaconelli (2-4, 7, 9, 10), Claude Engel (1), Manu Galvin (8, 12, 13), Olivier Marly (5), Jean-Félix Lalanne (11), Basile Leroux (6), Sébastien Chouard (14)
- Drum kit : Ian Thomas (2-4, 7, 9, 10), Thierry Chauvet-Peillex (8, 12, 13), Loïk Ponthieu (5), Marquito (11), Régis Ceccarelli (6), Laurent Coppola (14)
- Percussion : Denis Benarrosh (2-4, 7, 9, 10), Sydney Thiam (8, 12, 13)
- Strings direction : David Sinclair Whitaker (2-4, 7, 10), Khalil Chahine (1, 8, 9, 12, 13), Sébastien Surel (5), Gérard Capaldi and Henri Cavalier (14)
- Violins : Christophe Guiot (2-5, 7, 9-11, 14), Élisabeth Pallas (11)
- Piano : Jean-Christophe Soullier (8, 12, 13)
- Bass : Dominique Bertram (8, 12, 13), Laurent Verneray (5), Bernard Paganotti (11), Guy Delacroix (6), Jean-Marc Haroutiounian (14)
- Keyboards : Dominique Bertram (8, 12, 13), Julien Schulteis (6)
- Viola : François Gneri (11)
- Cello : Jean-Philippe Audin (11)
- Banjo : Jean-Yves Lozaëh (6)

== Charts and sales ==
=== Peak positions ===
Chart (2003/04)	Peak position
Belgian (Wallonia) Albums Chart	3
Finnish Albums Chart	16
French Albums Chart	1
Swiss Albums Chart	5

=== Year-end charts ===
Chart (2003)	Position
Belgian (Wallonia) Albums Chart	22
French Albums Chart	9
Swiss Albums Chart	92
Chart (2004)	Position
French Albums Chart	130

=== Certifications and sales ===
Region	Certification	Certified units/sales
France (SNEP)	2× Platinum	600,000^{*}
^{*} Sales figures based on certification alone.
