= Fèlix Millet i Maristany =

Spanish financier

- Born: 29 December 1903; Barcelona, Spain
- Died: 23 February 1967 (aged 63); Barcelona, Spain
- Occupations: financier, patron of the arts and cultural activist

Félix Millet i Maristany (Barcelona, December 29, 1903 – ibidem, February 23, 1967) was a Spanish financier, patron of the arts and cultural activist.

== Biography ==
He was the son of the cotton industrialist Joan Millet i Pagès and Antònia Maristany Colomé, and nephew of the co-founder of the Catalan Choral Society Lluís Millet. Always dedicating himself professionally to the insurance companies sector, in 1932 he was president of the Federation of Young Christians and director of the newspaper El Matí, close to UDC. At the outbreak of the civil war in 1936, he left for Trieste when he felt his life threatened in Catalonia, and later returned to Spain to volunteer in Burgos to fight on the side of the rebels.

In 1943 he founded the Benèfica Minerva, which was clandestinely dedicated to collective patronage, and in which the lawyer Pere Puig i Quintana, at the time Millet's right-hand man, collaborated.

In 1947, Millet was secretary of the Comissió Abat Oliba and president of the board of directors of the Banco Popular Español -until 1957- and of the Compañía Hispano Americana de Seguros y Reaseguros. As shareholder and president of Banco Popular, he made disappear "the merchant and shopkeeper mentality, linked, in this case, to the Madrid artisans" in the attempt to create "a modern bank, in every sense of the word". During Millet's tenure, the bank grew from 200 million to 5,000 million pesetas, and became the eighth largest in Spain in terms of deposits. At the beginning of 1957, however, the Millet family sold most of its shares and Fèlix Millet became honorary president.

Elected president of the Orfeón Catalán in 1951, he promoted the Obra del Ballet Popular, and in 1961 he was among the founders of Òmnium Cultural, an association of which he was the first president.

He was the father of Fèlix Millet i Tusell, founder in 1990 of the Fundació Orfeó Català-Palau de la Música Catalana and its president until his dismissal in 2009 amid accusations of corruption; of Joan Millet i Tusell, director of Banca Catalana; and of Xavier Millet i Tusell, Convergència i Unió candidate for mayor of Barcelona in the municipal elections of 1979.
