= El Matí =

El Matí was a newspaper in the Catalan language, published in Barcelona between 1929 and 1936.

== History ==
The newspaper published its first issue on May 24, 1929. It was a Catholic and Catalanist publication edited in Barcelona. The initiative was promoted by Josep Maria Junoy and Josep Maria Capdevila, among others, who in October 1928 launched a manifesto for the creation of an "independent, Catalan, and Catholic daily newspaper."

As a result of a manifesto published by the newspaper, the Democratic Union of Catalonia (UDC) was founded in 1931, and El Matí became its official mouthpiece. Many of its editors were members of this party and the Federació de Joves Cristians de Catalunya, including the newspaper’s directors Jaume Ruiz Manent and Fèlix Millet, and contributors such as Joaquim Civera, Mauricio Serrahima, Magí Valls, Lluís Jorda, J. M. Ràfols, J. M. Salvay, and Narcís de Carreras, among others.

Starting in 1931, the newspaper published a supplement, Esplai, which became an independent magazine in 1934.

El Matí published its last issue on July 19, 1936. With the outbreak of the Spanish Civil War, it was seized by the Republican authorities, and its printing facilities were handed over to the newly created Unified Socialist Party of Catalonia (PSUC), which used them to publish its newspaper, Treball. After the war, El Matí disappeared permanently.

Following the Francoist conquest of Barcelona in 1939, its facilities were confiscated by FET y de las JONS.

== Bibliography ==
- Alba, Víctor (1983). The Communist Party in Spain. New Brunswick: Transaction Books. ISBN 0-87855-464-5.
- Carreres, Joan (2003). Josep Maria Capdevila. Ideari i poètica. Publicacions de l'Abadia de Montserrat. ISBN 978-84-8415-513-3.
- Checa Godoy, Antonio (1989). Prensa y partidos políticos durante la II República. Universidad de Salamanca. ISBN 84-7481-521-5.
- de las Heras, José Antonio (2000). La prensa del movimiento y su gestión publicitaria, 1936-1984 (PDF). Universidad de Málaga.
- Espinet, Francesc; Tresserras, Joan Manuel (1999). La gènesi de la societat de masses a Catalunya, 1888-1939. Universidad Autónoma de Barcelona. ISBN 978-84-490-1557-1.
- Figueres, Josep M. (2010). Periodisme en la guerra civil. Publicacions de l'Abadia de Montserrat. ISBN 978-84-9883-312-6.
- Massot i Muntaner, Josep (1973). Aproximació a la història religiosa de la Catalunya contemporània. Publicacions de l'Abadia de Montserrat. ISBN 978-84-7202-168-6.
