= Je vous aime adieu =

Single by Hélène Ségara

from the album Cœur de verre
- B-side: "Loin"
- Released: April 1996
- Recorded: France, 1996
- Genre: Pop
- Length: 3:55
- Label: East West, Warner Music
- Songwriters: Hélène Segara, Thierry Geoffroy, Christian Vié, Christian Loigerot
- Producer: Orlando

Hélène Ségara singles chronology
"Loin" (1993)	"Je vous aime adieu" (1996)	"Une voix dans la nuit" (1996)

"Je vous aime adieu" (English: "I love you goodbye") is a 1996 song recorded by the French singer Hélène Ségara. It was her second single, and the first from her first album, Cœur de verre. Released in April 1996, it was a success in France and Belgium, but did not reach the top ten.

== Song information ==
The lyrics were written by Hélène Segara and Christian Vié, and the music was composed by Thierry Geoffroy and Christian Loigerot. The song deals with the departure of the singer from the French Riviera to Paris where she lived at the time. The B-side is Ségara's first single, "Loin", released in 1993, but which was a relative failure as it did not reach the charts.

"Je vous aime adieu" was performed during Ségara's first tour and thus is included on the live album En concert à l'Olympia, the sixth track on the first CD. It was also included on Ségara's 2004 compilation album, Le Best of (17th track).

== Chart performance ==
In France, "Je vous aime adieu" started at number 34 on 27 April 1996, reached a peak of number 13 in its 12th week, and remained in the top 20 for six weeks and in the top 50 for 21 weeks, achieving Silver status awarded by the SNEP. It charted for 15 weeks on the Belgian (Wallonia) Ultratop 40 Singles Chart. It debuted at number 31 on 10 August and reached number 16 two weeks later, remaining for seven weeks in the top 20, and became the 72nd best-selling single of the year. On the pan-European Hot 100 Singles chart compiled by the Music & Media magazine, it reached number 53 in its ninth week, and charted for 14 weeks.

== Track listings ==
CD single

No.	Title	Length
1.	"Je vous aime adieu"	3:39
2.	"Loin"	3:34

Digital download

No.	Title	Length
1.	"Je vous aime adieu" (album version)	3:55
2.	"Je vous aime adieu" (live at the Olympia)	4:19

== Charts ==
=== Weekly charts ===
Weekly chart performance for "Je vous aime adieu"
Chart (1996)	Peak position
Belgium (Ultratop 50 Wallonia)	16
Europe (Eurochart Hot 100)	53
France (SNEP)	13

=== Year-end charts ===
Year-end chart performance for "Je vous aime adieu"
Chart (1996)	Position
Belgium (Ultratop 40 Wallonia)	72
France (SNEP)	46

=== Certifications ===
Certifications for "Je vous aime adieu"
Region	Certification	Certified units/sales
France (SNEP)	Silver	125,000^{*}
^{*} Sales figures based on certification alone.
