= Tu vas me quitter =

Single by Hélène Ségara

from the album Au Nom d'une Femme
- B-side: "Mes Rêves disaient la vérité"
- Released: January 2001
- Recorded: France, 1999
- Genre: Pop
- Length: 3:51
- Label: East West; Warner Music
- Songwriters: Thierry Geoffroy, L. Deck; Christian Loigerot
- Producers: Sandro Abaldonato, Orlando

Hélène Ségara singles chronology
"Parlez-moi de nous" (2000)	"Tu vas me quitter" (2001)	"Au Nom d'une Femme" (2001)

Audio sample
- Hélène Ségara - "Tu vas me quitter": file; help

Alternative cover

"Tu vas me quitter" is a 1999 song recorded by French singer Hélène Ségara. It was the fourth single from her second studio album, Au Nom d'une Femme, and Ségara's 13th single overall. Released in January 2001, it achieved success, reaching the top ten in France and Belgium.

== Background and lyrics ==
The song was written by Deck and Christian Loigerot, and the music was composed by T.Geoffroy, who had worked on many songs from the album Au Nom d'une Femme. The second track, "Mes Rêves disaient la vérité", is an unreleased song composed by Michel Jourdan and N.Kaniel. "Tu vas me quitter" deals about a loving break in which the narrator admits to have anticipated the end of this relation and to be unhappy because of this.

== Live versions ==
The song is also available on the live album En concert à l'Olympia, but in Spanish-language, under the title "Me vas a dejar". Lyrics in this version were written by the French singer and songwriter Nilda Fernandez. "Tu vas me quitter" also features on Ségara's greatest hits album Le Best of.

== Chart performance ==
In France, "Tu vas me quitter" debuted at number 23 on 3 February 2001, then climbed to number seven, then almost always dropped on the chart, and totaled four weeks in the top ten, 15 weeks in the top 50 and 20 weeks in the top 100. It achieved Silver status awarded by the SNEP, and ranked at number 56 on the year-end chart.

"Tu was me quitter" went to number 37 on 10 February on the Walloon chart, then jumped to number 14 and hit number 10 for two consecutive weeks, and fell off the chart after 13 weeks. It was the 66th best-selling single of 2001. On the pan-Eurochart Hot 100 Singles chart compiled by Music & Media, it peaked at number 38 in its second week.

== Track listings ==
CD single

No.	Title	Length
1.	"Tu vas me quitter"	3:51
2.	"Mes rêves disaient la vérité"	4:31

Digital download

No.	Title	Length
1.	"Tu vas me quitter"	3:51
2.	"Me vas a dejar" (Spanish version)	4:06

== Personnel ==
- Lyrics and music: L.Deck, C.Loigerot and T.Geoffroy
- Programmation, conductor, keyboards: Sandro Abaldonato
- Guitar: Serge Eymar
- Mixing: Thierry Rogen, Studio Mega / Grégoire Noteris, Studio SBG
- Artistic director: Antoine Angelelli
- Production: Orlando for B.G.
- Photos: Franck Camhi - Jet Set, Denis Taranto
- Cover: Barejo
- Editions: Bambino

== Charts ==
=== Weekly charts ===
Weekly chart performance for "Tu vas me quitter"
Chart (2001)	Peak position
Belgium (Ultratop 50 Wallonia)	10
Europe (Eurochart Hot 100 Singles)	38
France (SNEP)	7

=== Year-end charts ===
Year-end chart performance for "Tu vas me quitter"
Chart (2001)	Position
Belgium (Ultratop 50 Wallonia)	66
France (SNEP)	56

== Certifications and sales ==
Certifications for "Tu vas me quitter"
Region	Certification	Certified units/sales
France (SNEP)	Silver	125,000^{*}
^{*} Sales figures based on certification alone.
