= L'amour est un soleil =

Single by Hélène Ségara

from the album Humaine
- B-side: "Petites Douleurs"
- Released: 11 April 2003
- Recorded: France, 2003
- Genre: Pop
- Length: 3:54
- Label: East West, Warner Music
- Songwriter(s): Romano Musumarra, Roberto Zanelli, Luc Plamondon
- Producer(s): Pierre Jaconelli

Hélène Ségara singles chronology
"Donner tout" (2002)	"L'amour est un soleil" (2003)	"Encore une fois" (2003)

"L'amour est un soleil" is a 2003 song recorded by French artist Hélène Ségara. It was the lead single from her fourth studio album, Humaine, on which it features as third track, and was released on 11 April 2003. It was a hit particularly in France, where it almost topped the chart.

== Song information ==
Romano Musumarra, who had previously worked for many famous artists, such as Jeanne Mas, Elsa Lunghini and Princess Stéphanie of Monaco, participated in the writing of the song. French-Canadian lyricist Luc Plamondon, who had already written songs from the musical Notre-Dame de Paris, also composed the song. When it was composed, Ségara had just given birth to her second son, and lyrics were inspired by this event.

The song was included on Ségara's 2004 greatest hits album Le Best of and was also available on many French compilations, such as Stars France 2003, Vol. 2. It was also the b-side of Ségara's 2004 single "On ne dit pas".

== Chart performance ==
"L'Amour est un soleil" went straight to number two on 19 April 2003, and stayed there for three consecutive weeks, but was unable to dislodge Florent Pagny's hit "Ma liberté de penser" which topped the chart then. Afterwards, the single almost always dropped, and remained for six weeks in the top ten, 13 weeks in the top 50 and 19 weeks on the chart, hitting Gold status awarded by the SNEP and featuring at number 36 on the year-end chart.

In Belgium (Wallonia), the song was less successful, peaking only at number 14 in its fifth week, on 31 May, and it dropped quickly, and fell off the chart after eight weeks.

In Switzerland, "L'Amour est un soleil" peaked at number 13 twice, in its first and fourth weeks, then dropped quickly. It remained for five weeks in the top 20 and 13 weeks on the chart (top 100). It was Ségara's second-most-successful single in this country (the first is "On oublie rien, on vit avec").

== Track listings ==
CD single

No.	Title	Length
1.	"L'Amour est un soleil"	3:54
2.	"Petites Douleurs"	3:29

Digital download

No.	Title	Length
1.	"L'Amour est un soleil" (album version)	4:06

== Personnel ==
- Lyrics : Luc Plamondon
- Music : Romano Musumarra and Roberto Zaneli
- Arrangements : Pierre Jaconelli
- Keyboards programmations : Sébastien Cortella
- Guitars : Pierre Jaconelli
- Drum kit : Ian Thomas
- Bass : Nicolas Fiszman
- Percussion : Denis Benarrosh
- Strings direction : David Sinclair Whitaker
- Strings : Les Archers de Paris
- Orchestral direction : Philippe Nadal
- Violin : Christian Guiot
- Recording and mixing : Peter Schwier at Studio Mega C / Guillaume Tell Studio
- Edited by Georges Mary editions / Luc Plamondon

== Charts and sales ==
=== Peak positions ===
Chart (2003)	Peak position
Belgian (Wallonia) Singles Chart	14
French SNEP Singles Chart	2
Swiss Singles Chart	13

=== Year-end charts ===
Chart (2003)	Position
Belgian (Wallonia) Singles Chart	95
French Singles Chart	36

=== Certifications and sales ===
Region	Certification	Certified units/sales
France (SNEP)	Gold	250,000^{*}
^{*} Sales figures based on certification alone.
