= Mathilde Sternat =

French cellist and arranger

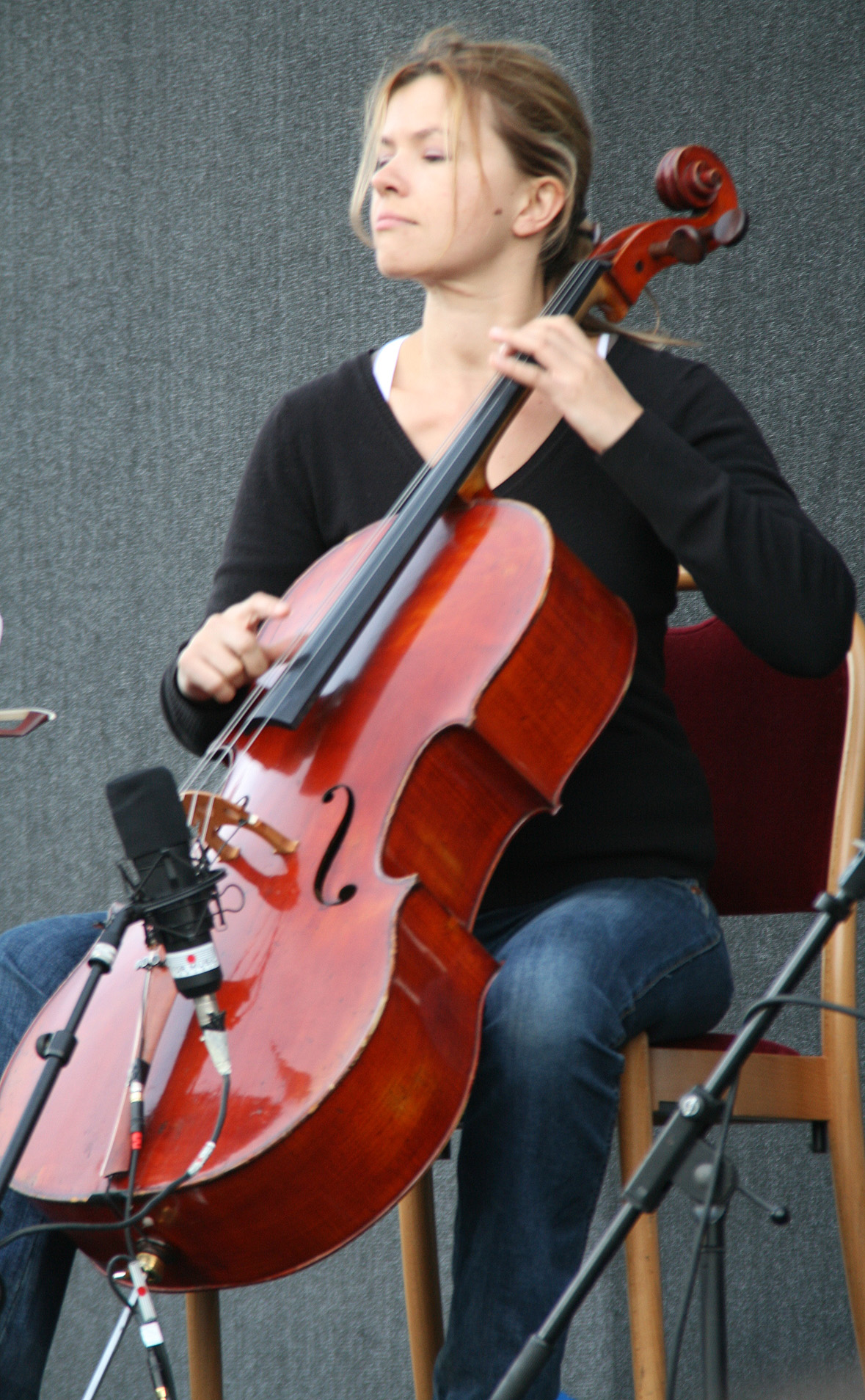
- Sternat in 2007
- Born: France
- Education: Conservatoire de Paris
- Occupations: Cellist; arranger
- Style: Classical; chamber; art music

Mathilde Sternat is a French cellist and arranger.

== Life ==
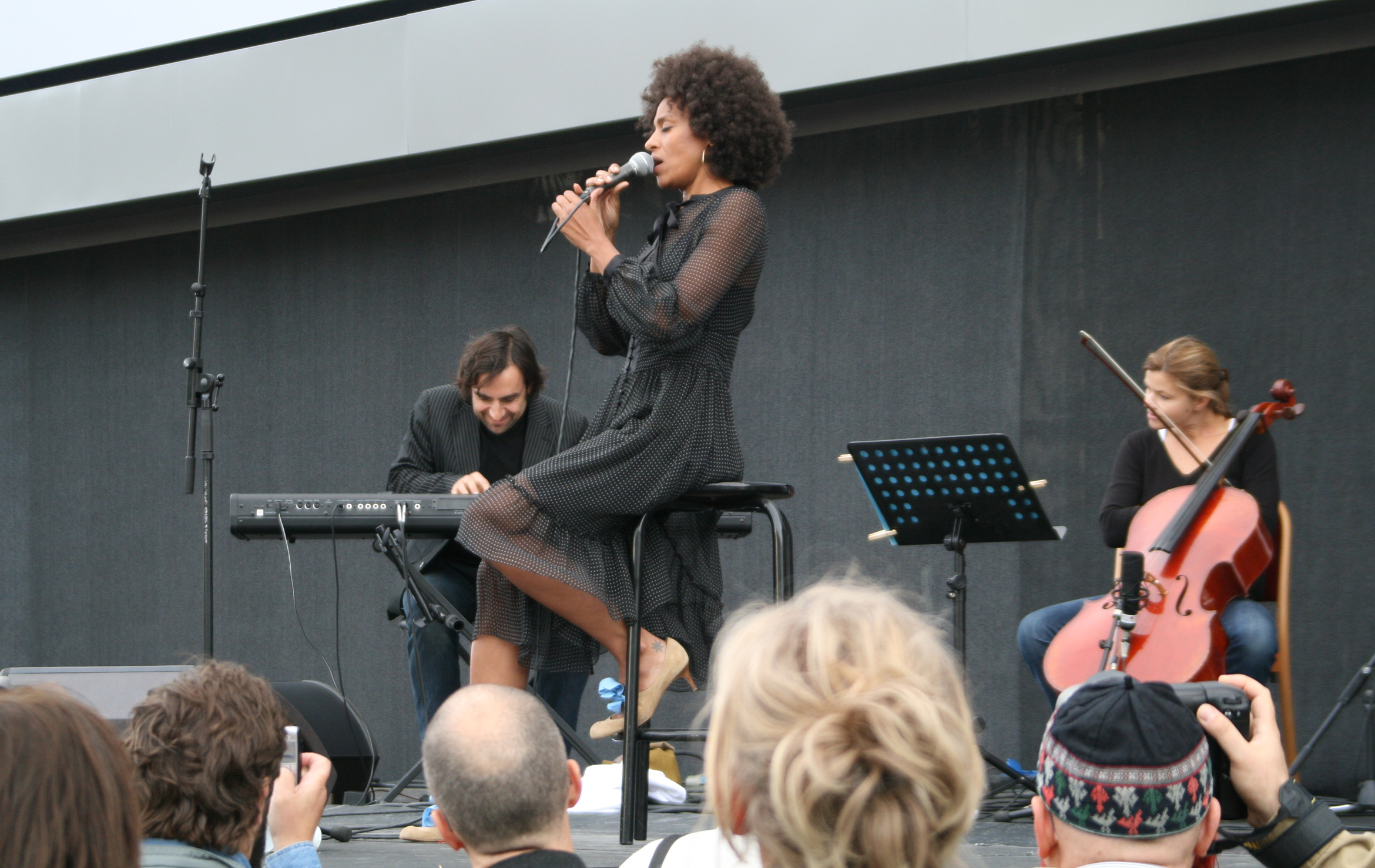
Sternat with Malia at Jazz Fest Wien, Rathausplatz, Vienna, 2007; from left: André Manoukian, Malia, and Sternat.

Sternat studied the cello and chamber music, notably with Étienne Péclard, at the Conservatoire de Paris and won her prize in 1995. Since then, she has been playing chamber music in small ensembles and in different chamber orchestras (Camerata Salzburg and the Chamber Orchestra of Europe) and as soloist of several symphony orchestras (the Orchestre philharmonique de Montpellier, the Orchestre symphonique de Tours, and the Orchestre lyrique de Tours).

As a member of the Travelling Quartet – Anne Gravoin, David Braccini (violins); Sternat (cello); Vincent Pasquier (double bass) – she writes arrangements of the repertoire of the art music of the 19th and early 20th centuries (Tchaikovsky, Brahms, Offenbach, Satie, among others), and arrangements of jazz (Scott Joplin, Bill Evans, George Gershwin, Astor Piazzolla, notably), pop (such as The Beatles), film scores, and French songs (Édith Piaf, Jacques Brel, Charles Aznavour, among others).

In addition to her engagements mainly for chamber music, Sternat composes and arranges music for theatre performances and regularly performs in concert and recording studio with mainly French musicians, but also internationally-known musicians, such as Malia, Patrick Bruel, Laurent Voulzy, Michel Sardou, Nolwenn Leroy and Sofia Mestari.

== Selected discography ==
- Luigi Boccherini, Quintets with flute [G.437-442] – with Jean-Pierre Rampal, Régis Pasquier, Bruno Pasquier and Roland Pidoux (Sony SK 62 679, 1997) OCLC 906156351
- Eleftheria Arvanitaki, Diffusion (EmArcy/Universal, 2001)
- Jacques Loussier Trio, Mozart, Concertos pour piano 20 & 23 (Telarc, 2005)
- Nolwenn Leroy, Histoires Naturelles (Mercury/Universal, 2006)
