= Oriol Martorell i Codina =

Oriol Martorell i Codina (1927 in Barcelona – 1996) was a musical director, pedagogue and professor of history. He was the son of Artur Martorell i Bisbal, also a renowned pedagogue. While studying music he gained a doctorate in History.

He obtained a BA from the University of Barcelona in 1950 and a master's degree in Pedagogy from the University of Perugia (Italy) in 1954.

In 1947 he founded the Saint George Choir (Coral Sant Jordi), of which he was director during 40 years. It was a symbol of cultural anti-Franchoism and a reference point among European choirs. A specialist in choral direction, he taught on this subject in different countries. he was the founder and vice-chairman of the European Federation of Young Choirs (Europaeische Foederation Junger Choere), instructor of the choral movement À Coeur Joie and president of the Catalan Federation of Choral Entities (Federació Catalana d’Entitats Corals). He worked as a critic for several publications and collaborated in different musical works. He was artistic director of Discos Vergara between 1961 and 1970. He was also co-author with Manuel Valls of the book El fet musical; he also published, with Josep Massot Muntaner and Salvador Pueyo, Els Segadors: Himne Nacional de Catalunya. He was artistic director of the Antologia històrica de la música catalana (1966- 1970).In 1983 he was appointed professor of Music History of the University of Barcelona, of which he had already been a teacher since 1970.

He was awarded with several distinctions such as the “Premi d’Honor Jaume I” in 1983, the “Creu de Sant Jordi” of the Generalitat de Catalunya in 1984, the “Medalla al Mèrit Artístic” of Barcelona Town Council, the music award Francesc Pujols i Pons and the “Medalla de Bellas Artes” of the Ministry of Culture.

The first Catalan public centre for primary school studies combined with music and dance was named after him.

As part of his political activity he was elected MP to the Parliament of Catalonia, a post he held from 1992 to 1995.
