= Il y a trop de gens qui t'aiment =

Single by Hélène Ségara

from the album Au Nom d'une Femme
- B-side: "Mrs Jones"
- Released: 8 November 1999
- Recorded: 1999
- Genre: Pop
- Length: 4:25
- Label: East West, Warner Music
- Songwriters: Thierry Geoffroy, Christian Vié
- Producer: Michel Coeuriot

Hélène Ségara singles chronology
"Les Vallées d'Irlande" (1998)	"Il y a trop de gens qui t'aiment" (1999)	"Elle, tu l'aimes..." (2000)

Audio sample
- Hélène Ségara - "Il y a trop de gens qui t'aiment": file; help

"Il y a trop de gens qui t'aiment" is the name of a 1999 song recorded by French artist Hélène Ségara. It was the first single from her second studio album, Au Nom d'une Femme, on which it features as first track. Released on 8 November 1999, the song became a hit in Belgium (Wallonia) and France, topping the singles charts.

== Music and lyrics ==
The song was written by Christian Vié and the music composed by Thierry Geoffroy.

This ballad deals with a love that is not shared: indeed, in the lyrics, Ségara observes the man she loves, and describes his actions, but as he is surrounded by many other people, he does not pay attention to her. The text "contrasts the coldness of the remoteness of the person loved and the narrator's thwarted love".

The song is characterized by a "stripped orchestration" and a "romantic monotony in the repetitive chords" played on piano. In the refrain, Ségara sings in the high notes, accompanied by strings, expressing her suffering. The song ends with a solo played on violin that seems to express the singer's resignation.

== Performances and cover versions ==
Ségara sang twice "Il y a trop de gens qui t'aiment" during her first tour named Au Nom d'une Femme. The live version is included on her album En concert à l'Olympia, which also contains a version in Spanish-language, under the title "Yo lo siento per mi", written by Nilda Fernandez. The song was also part of many French compilations, such as Hits de diamant, released in 2007.

In 2002, the song was covered by Roch Voisine, Muriel Robin and Patrick Fiori for Les Enfoirés's album 2002: Tous dans le même bateau, as 13th track in a 3:44 version.

== Chart performance ==
In France, "Il y a trop de gens qui t'aiment" debuted at number 41 on 13 November 1999 on the SNEP Singles chart, entered the top ten in its ninth week and topped the chart for two non consecutive weeks, in its 12th and 15th weeks. It totalled 14 weeks in the top ten, 32 weeks in the top 50 and 36 weeks in the top 100, was certified Platinum by the SNEP, and was the 15th most successful single of 2000. In Belgium (Wallonia), it entered the Ultratop 40 at number 38 on 4 December 1999, reached the top ten in its sixth week and topped the chart for seven weeks, spending 12 weeks in the top ten and 23 weeks on the chart. It ranked at number nine on the 2000 Annual Chart.

== Track listing ==
CD single

No.	Title	Length
1.	"Il y a trop de gens qui t'aiment"	4:25
2.	"Mrs Jones"	3:30

Digital download

No.	Title	Length
1.	"Il y a trop de gens qui t'aiment"	4:25
2.	"Il y a trop de gens qui t'aiment" (Live at the Olympia)	4:50

== Personnel ==
- Lyrics and music: C.Vie and T.Goeffroy
- Programmation and orchestral direction: Michel Cœuriot
- Mixing: Stéphane Briand at Guillaume Tell Studio
- Drum kit: Laurent Faucheux
- Bass: Laurent Verneray
- Guitar: Thomas Cœuriot
- Synth programmation: Celmar Engel
- Keyboards: Michel Cœuriot
- Strigs direction: Anne Gravoin
- Violins: Anne Gravoin, Hélène Blazy, Françoise Perrin, Jean-Philippe Kuzma, Anne Morel, Daniel Dato, Véronique Engelhard, Arnaud Nuvolone, Anne Villette, Jean-Lou Descamps and Thomas Tercieux
- Alto: Fanny Coupe, Christophe Gaugue, Christine Jaboulay and Setrag Koulaksezian
- Cello: Mathilde Sternat, Frédéric Lagarde and Jean-Claude Auclin
- Editions: Bambino

== Charts ==
=== Weekly charts ===
Weekly chart performance for "Il y a trop de gens qui t'aiment"
Chart (1999–2000)	Peak position
Belgium (Ultratop 50 Wallonia)	1
Europe (Eurochart Hot 100 Singles)	8
France (SNEP)	1

=== Year-end charts ===
Year- end chart performance for "Il y a trop de gens qui t'aiment"
Chart (2000)	Position
Belgium (Ultratop 40 Wallonia)	9
Europe (Eurochart Hot 100 Singles)	36
France (SNEP)	15

== Certifications ==
Certifications for "Il y a trop de gens qui t'aiment"
Region	Certification	Certified units/sales
France (SNEP)	Platinum	500,000^{*}
^{*} Sales figures based on certification alone.
