= Hélène Ségara =

French singer (born 1971)

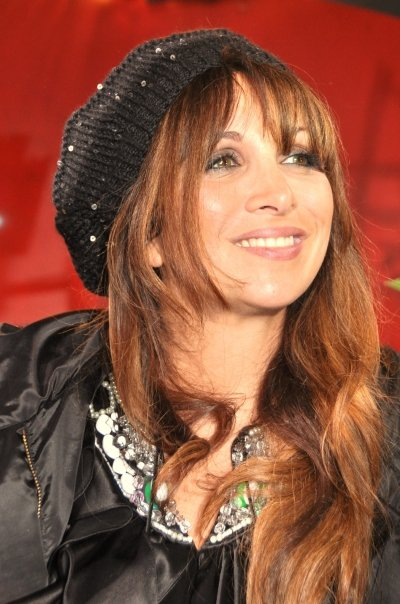
- Ségara in 2008

Background information
- Born: Hélène Aurore Alice Rizzo; 26 February 1971 (age 55); Six-Fours-les-Plages, France
- Genres: Pop
- Occupations: Singer, songwriter
- Years active: 1993–present
- Labels: East West, Warner Music France, Mercury France, Universal, Smart
- Website: helenesegara.fr

Hélène Ségara (French: [elɛn seɡaʁa]; born Hélène Aurore Alice Rizzo, 26 February 1971) is a French singer who came to prominence playing the role of Esmeralda in the French musical Notre Dame de Paris. She has sold over 10 million records.

== Biography ==
=== Childhood in the French Riviera ===
Hélène Ségara was born on 26 February 1971 on her grandfather's farm in Six-Fours-les-Plages. Her father, Bernardo Rizzo, is of Italian descent and her mother, Thérèse Kasbarian, is Armenian. She has cited her parents' divorce when she was eight and the death of her grandfather when she was 16 as defining moments of her childhood.

As she wanted to become a singer, she left school and family at the age of 14. As a teenager, her jobs included performing in the piano bars of the French Riviera.

At 18, she gave birth to Raphael, her first son. Drawing on many musical influences she was a prolific songwriter during this period, and her repertoire grew to over a thousand songs in seven languages. In 1993, her first single, "Loin", was released, but failed to achieve success.

=== Life in Paris ===
In 1996, accompanied by her young son, she moved to Paris, where she met Christian Loigerot, who became one of her composers. She also met the famous producer Orlando Gigliotti, Dalida's brother, who gave new impetus to her career. Although impressed by the experience and professionalism of this mentor, she was still under contract with her first producer.

Ségara's first success came with "Je vous aime adieu," the first single from her debut album, Cœur de verre (1996), followed by the duet "Vivo per lei," performed with Andrea Bocelli. Her big break came when she was selected to play Esmeralda in Richard Cocciante's musical Notre Dame de Paris. Although she auditioned for the role in 1997, she wasn't selected until 1999, following the withdrawal of the Israeli singer Noa. "When fate knocks at the door for a second time, we must not let it get away," said Ségara.

However, her career was jeopardized after she was diagnosed with a cyst on her vocal cords although she continued to perform. During a show in Canada, she lost her voice. Her producer then resold her contract to Orlando, while a laser operation was carried out to treat her vocal cords.

=== A new start ===
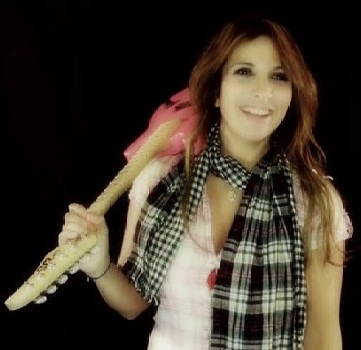
Ségara promoting her 2011 single "la Vie avec toi"

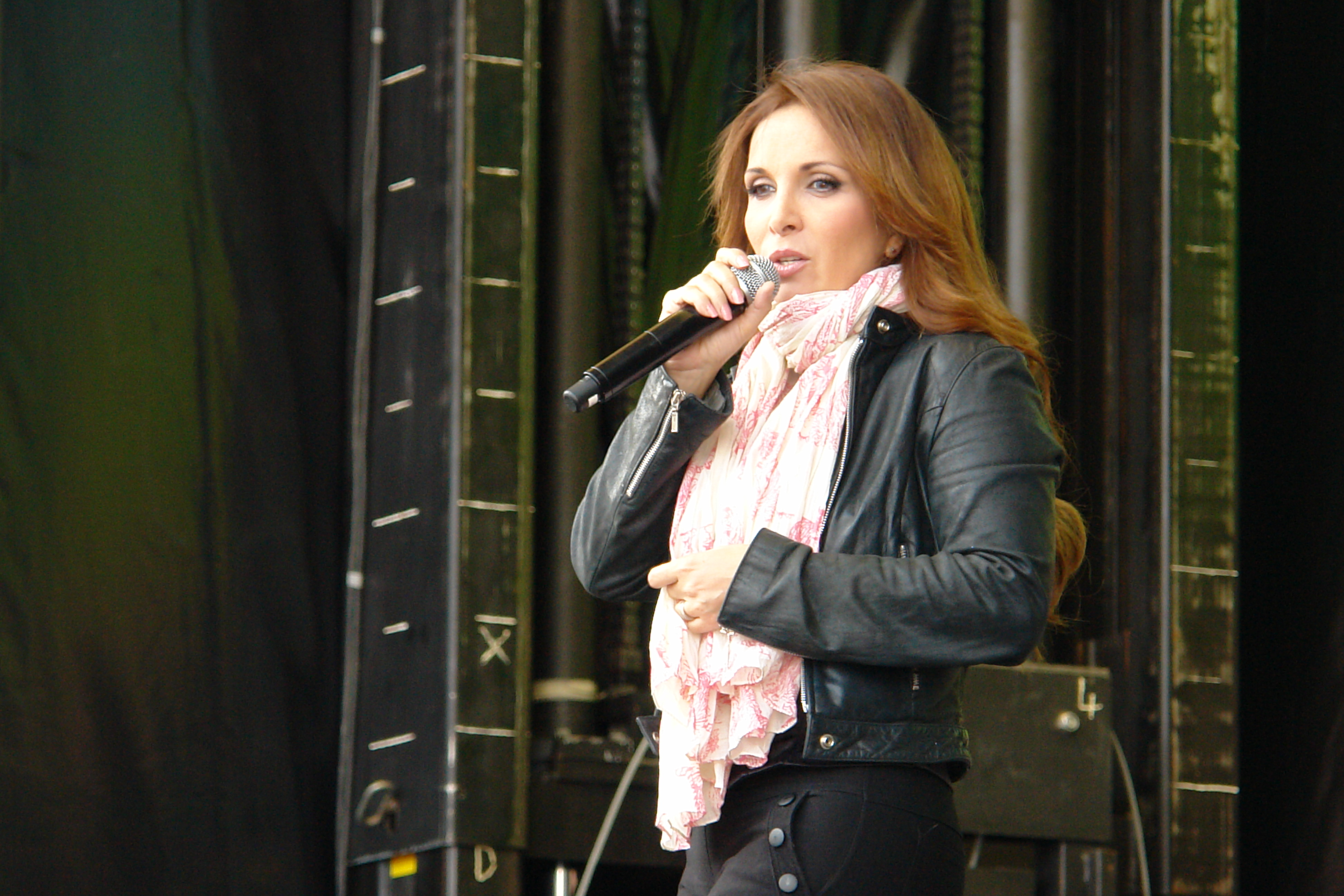
Ségara in concert in 2012

After her recovery, she recorded her second album, Au Nom d'une femme in 2000 which topped the charts in France. Five singles were released from the album. Ségara then began a concert tour that lasted about two years. A video recording of the concert she gave at the Olympia in Paris on this occasion was released. According to a poll made by the IFOP, Segara was the French people's favourite French singer at the time.

In March 2003, she released a third album, Humaine, including "On n'oublie rien, on vit avec", a duet with Laura Pausini and "L'Amour est un soleil", composed by Romano Musumarra. The album sold around 700,000 copies. She began another tour in late 2003 but was forced to stop her performances because of a difficult pregnancy. In August 2003, Ségara married Mathieu Lecat (son of journalist Didier Lecat) in Ajaccio, with whom she had two further children: Matteo and Maïa.

Her fourth studio album, Quand l'éternité ... came out in 2006. The first single from this album, "Méfie-toi de moi", was followed by "Rien n'est comme avant". This album has a different style from previous ones, with more pronounced rock influences, with lyrics largely written by the singer, discussing issues such as absence, death and hope. The album eventually achieved gold status three months after its release for more than 200,000 copies sold. In early 2007, she began a new concert tour in France, including the Palais des Sports in Paris.

In 2007, having finished the first part of her tour, two other songs from the album received radio play, despite not being released as singles: "Tu ne seras jamais libre" and "Father". In late 2007, several editions came out: a box set with of 3 CDs (Les 50 plus belles chansons d'Hélène Segara), two boxes consisting of two CDs with a new cover (Cœur de verre + Au Nom d'une femme, Humaine + Quand l'éternité...) and a CD 'Prestige' with 15 tracks. In February 2008, she released "La Moitié de nous", a duet with Bruno Pelletier, with a percentage of profits given to the charity Rêves. The tour "Quand l'éternité..." ran until summer 2008, in France and abroad.

=== Il Divo ===
In 2014 Hélène performed the song "Memory" from the musical Cats with the quartet Il Divo. The song was included on the group's disc A Musical Affair (2014).

== Other activity ==
- In 1998, Ségara performed with Garou a duet for the album Ensemble contre le sida (Eng: Together Against AIDS). The song is a cover version of "L'amour existe encore", composed by Luc Plamondon and Richard Cocciante for Celine Dion.
- She is a supporter of the charities Rêves, Les Restos du Cœur, Les Enfants de la Terre et e-enfance.
- She sang on the album Le Cœur des femmes in aid of the Association Laurette Fugain, as well as charity programs on France 3.
- She is also godmother of the charity Suisse, Espace Adoption, which supports adoptive families and adopted children.
- Hélène Ségara has been ambassador of the association Rêves since 1998.
- On 4 November 2006, Hélène took part in the Concert for Tolerance in Agadir, Morocco, where she performed alongside artists including Andrea Bocelli, Samira Said, Zucchero, Pascal Obispo, Florent Pagny, Faudel, Cheb Mami, Lorie and Amiina.

== Awards ==
- Spring 1997: The Sacem awarded the Prix Rolf Marbot to Ségara, Thierry Geoffroy, Christian Loigerot and Christian Vié, for the song "Je vous aime adieu".
- 1999: Best Female Singer at the 'Trophy of Women in Gold' ceremony in Courchevel.
- 22 January 2000: Revelation of the year at the 'NRJ Music Awards' in Cannes
- 17 November 2000: Female Artist of the Year "M6 Music Awards" in Lille
- 16 December 2000: 'Petit Princes' Trophy for the Best Singer of the Year on TF1
- 20 January 2001: Francophone album of the year at the Palais des Festivals in Cannes a 'NRJ Music Awards'.
- 17 February 2001: Female artist of the year at 'Victoire de la Musique'
- 2 May 2001: 'World Music Awards' in Monaco for the highest selling disc in France for 2000/2001
- 20 October 2001: IFOP poll, ordered by the magazine TV Star, revealed that Ségara is the favourite French singer and the performer of the most beautiful love songs
- 25 October 2001: Ségara was featured in Who's Who.
- 27 December 2001: Segara formed a part of 10 stars who made 2001, according to the French people, for the magazine Gala.
- 10 July 2002: 'IFPI Platinum Europe Awards' in Brussels
- 1 October 2002: Featured at the Grevin Museum in Paris
- 13 January 2005: 'Most beautiful love song' at the Fête de la Musique on France 2, for "Il y a trop de gens qui t'aiment".

== Discography ==
=== Albums ===
- 1996: Cœur de verre
- 1998: Notre Dame de Paris (musical)
- 2000: Au Nom d'une Femme
- 2001: En concert à l'Olympia
- 2002: Hélène (in Spanish-language)
- 2003: Humaine
- 2004: Le Best of
- 2006: Quand l'éternité...
- 2007: Les 50 plus belles chansons
- 2007: Collection prestige
- 2008: Mon pays c'est la terre
- 2011: Parmi la foule
- 2013: Et si tu n'existais pas
- 2014: "Tout commence aujourd'hui"
- 2016: "Amaretti" (in Italian-language)
- 2021: "Karma"

=== Singles ===
- 1993: "Loin"
- 1996: "Je vous aime adieu"
- 1996: "Une voix dans la nuit"
- 1997: "Les Larmes" (remix)
- 1997: "Auprès de ceux que j'aimais"
- 1997: "Vivo per lei (je vis pour elle)" (duet with Andrea Bocelli)
- 1998: "Loin du froid de Décembre" (soundtrack from Anastasia)
- 1998: "Vivre" (soundtrack from the musical Notre-Dame de Paris)
- 1999: "Les Vallées d'Irlande"
- 1999: "Il y a trop de gens qui t'aiment"
- 2000: "Elle, tu l'aimes..."
- 2000: "Parlez-moi de nous"
- 2001: "Tu vas me quitter"
- 2001: "Au nom d'une femme" (Remix)
- 2001: "Mrs Jones" (Live Olympia 2000)
- 2002: "Donner tout"
- 2003: "L'Amour est un soleil"
- 2003: "Encore une fois"
- 2003: "On n'oublie jamais rien, on vit avec" (duet with Laura Pausini)
- 2004: "Humaine"
- 2004: "On ne dit pas"
- 2004: "Ailleurs comme ici"
- 2006: "Méfie-toi de moi"
- 2007: "Rien n'est comme avant"
- 2007: "Tu ne seras jamais libre"
- 2007: "Father"
- 2008: "La Moitié de nous" (duet with Bruno Pelletier)
- 2008: "Qu'est-ce qu'on faire avec ce monde (Sodad)"
- 2009: "Danse à Nouveau"
- 2011: "La Vie avec toi"
- 2011: "À la renverse"
- 2013: "Et si tu n'existais pas" (duet with Joe Dassin)
- 2014: "Memory" (duet with Il Divo.)
- 2014:"Tout commence aujourd'hui"
- 2015:"Genre Humain"
- 2016:"L'envol(Il Envol)"

Preceded by Natacha Atlas	Victoires de la Musique; Female artist of the year 2001	Succeeded by Zazie
