= Elle, tu l'aimes... =

Single by Hélène Ségara

from the album Au Nom d'une Femme
- B-side: "Rebelles"
- Released: 18 April 2000
- Recorded: France, 1999
- Genre: Pop
- Length: 5:06 (album version); 4:25 (radio version)
- Label: East West, Warner Music
- Songwriter(s): Michel Jourdan, Fernando de Brito, Ferrer Trinidade
- Producer(s): Sandro Abaldonato, Orlando

Hélène Ségara singles chronology
"Il y a trop de gens qui t'aiment" (1999)	"Elle, tu l'aimes..." (2000)	"Parlez-moi de nous" (2000)

Audio sample
- Hélène Ségara - "Elle, tu l'aimes": file; help

"Elle, tu l'aimes..." is a 1999 song recorded by French artist Hélène Ségara, released on April 18, 2000. It was the second single from her second studio album, Au Nom d'une Femme, on which it features as the fourth track. Although it failed to reach number one on the charts, it was a hit like Ségara's previous single, "Il y a trop de gens qui t'aiment".

== Song information ==
The music was composed by Frederico de Brito and Ferrer Trinidade. The French lyrics were written by Michel Jourdan. It is based on the Portuguese fado, "Solidão (Canção do Mar)" by Amália Rodrigues (and later Dulce Pontes) covered in a Mediterranean style with a melodic tune played on piano. The percussion use the cadence of a languorous belly dance. As for the previous single, "Elle, tu l'aimes..." deals with a love that is not shared. In the music video, the singer loves a man who is marrying another woman but in reality he loves the other one.

Performed during Ségara's first tour, the song is also available in a live version on her album En concert à l'Olympia. The song was also included on the singer compilation Le Best of. It also features on many French compilations, such as Les Plus Grandes Chansons du siècle, vol. 2 and Les Plus Belles Victoires de la Musique, released in 2002.

== Chart performance ==
In France, "Elle, tu l'aimes..." entered the chart at number 21 on 22 April 2000, although the previous hit "Il y a trop de gens qui t'aiment" was still well placed, in its 24th week. It reached the top ten two weeks later and hit number three in its seventh week. It remained for 14 weeks in the top ten, then dropped slowly, totalling 26 weeks in the top 50 and 31 weeks on the chart. It achieved Platinum status, and appeared at number 11 on the year-end chart.

In Belgium (Wallonia), the single debuted at number 24 on 29 April, jumped to number ten and peaked at number four in the ninth week. It fell off the chart (top 40) after 20 weeks, 12 of them spent in the top ten. It ranked at number 14 on the year-end chart. On the pan-Eurochart Hot 100 Singles chart, it reached number 15 twice, in its seventh and ninth week, and charted for 23 weeks.

== Track listings ==
CD single

No.	Title	Length
1.	"Elle, tu l'aimes..." (radio edit)	4:25
2.	"Rebelles"	4:46

Digital download

No.	Title	Length
1.	"Elle, tu l'aimes..." (album version)	5:06
2.	"Elle, tu l'aimes..." (live at the Olympia)	4:27

== Personnel ==
- Lyrics and music: F.Brito, F.Trinidade
- Adaptation: Michel Jourdan
- Programmation and keyboards: Sandro Abaldonato
- Guitar: Serge Eymar
- Mixing: Thierry Rogen, at Studio Mega
- Assistant: Xavier Poisonnier
- Editions: Warner Chappell Music

== Charts ==
=== Weekly charts ===
Weekly chart performance for "Elle, tu l'aimes..."
Chart (2000)	Peak position
Belgium (Ultratop 50 Wallonia)	4
Europe (Eurochart Hot 100 Singles)	15
France (SNEP)	3

=== Year-end charts ===
Year-end chart performance for "Elle, tu l'aimes..."
Chart (2000)	Position
Belgium (Ultratop 50 Wallonia)	14
Europe (Eurochart Hot 100 Singles)	54
France (SNEP)	11

== Certifications ==
Certifications for "Elle, tu l'aimes..."
Region	Certification	Certified units/sales
France (SNEP)	Platinum	500,000^{*}
^{*} Sales figures based on certification alone.
