= Quand l'éternité... =

Studio album by Hélène Ségara
- Released: September 2006
- Recorded: France
- Genre: Pop
- Label: Mercury

Hélène Ségara chronology
| Le Best of (2004) | Quand l'éternité... (2006) | Les 50 Plus Belles Chansons (2007) |

Singles from Quand l'éternité...
- 1. "Méfie-toi de moi" Released: October 30, 2006; 2. "Rien n'est comme avant" Released: February 26, 2007; 3. "Tu ne seras jamais libre" Released: 2007; 4. "Father" Released: 2007

Quand l'éternité... is the name of the fourth studio album recorded by the French singer Hélène Ségara, and her seventh overall. It was released in September 2006, and even if it started at the top of the charts, it was one of Ségara's less-selling albums.

== Track listing ==
| # | Title | Length |
|---|---|---|
| 1. | "Rien n'est comme avant" (Goudeau, Lecat, Segara) | 3:54 |
| 2. | "Méfie-toi de moi" (Goudeau, Lecat, Segara) | 3:52 |
| 3. | "Tu ne seras jamais libre" (Humpe, Segara) | 3:35 |
| 4. | "Quel est ton nom" (Goudeau, Lecat, Segara) | 4:29 |
| 5. | "Father" (Goudeau, Lecat, Segara) | 4:16 |
| 6. | "Femme" (Angelelli, Capaldi, Goudeau) | 3:52 |
| 7. | "On dort toujours tout seul" (Goudeau, Lecat) | 3:56 |
| 8. | "Dans nos souvenirs" (Goudeau, Potron, Segara) | 4:10 |
| 9. | "Je te retiens" (Lecat, Segara) | 3:56 |
| 10. | "J'attends" (Cosso, Goudeau, Lanty, Segara) | 4:00 |
| 11. | "Douce" (Loigerot, Sagnières) | 3:09 |
| 12 | "Quand l'éternité..." (Lecat, Segara) | 3:48 |

== Certifications and sales ==
| Country | Certification | Date | Sales certified | Physical sales |
|---|---|---|---|---|
| France | 2 x Gold | 2006 | 150,000 | 77,787 in 2006 |

== Charts ==
| Chart (2006–2007) | Peak position |
|---|---|
| Belgian (Wallonia) Albums Chart | 4 |
| French Albums Chart | 1 |
| Swiss Albums Chart | 28 |

| End of the year chart (2006) | Position |
|---|---|
| Belgian (Wallonia) Albums Chart | 60 |
| French Albums Chart | 83 |
