= Vivo per lei =

1997 single by Andrea Bocelli

- Cover from the duet version with Hélène Ségara

Single by Andrea Bocelli & Giorgia

from the album Bocelli and Romanza
- B-side: "Voglio restare così"
- Released: 1996 (Italian and Spanish versions); April 1997 (German version); December 1997 (French version)
- Recorded: 1995
- Genre: Operatic pop
- Length: 4:23
- Label: Polydor; Polygram
- Songwriters: Gatto Panceri; Valerio Zelli
- Producer: Mauro Malavasi

Andrea Bocelli singles chronology
"Per amore" (1995)	"Vivo per lei" (1996)	"Vivo por ella" (1996)
"Vivo per lei" (1996)	"Vivo por ella" (1996)	"Time to Say Goodbye" (1996)
"Time to Say Goodbye" (1996)	"Ich lebe für sie" (1997)	"Je vis pour elle" (1997)
"Ich lebe für sie" (1997)	"Je vis pour elle" (1997)	"The Prayer" (1999)
"Da Stanotte in Poi (From This Moment On)" (2024)	"Vivo por Ella" (2024)	"Rimani Qui" (2024)

Giorgia singles chronology
"Riguarda noi" (1995)	"Vivo per lei" (1996)	"Strano il mio destino" (1996)

Hélène Ségara singles chronology
"Auprès de ceux que j'aimais" (1997)	"Je vis pour elle" (1997)	"Loin du froid de décembre" (1998)

Sandy singles chronology
"Vivo por Ella" (1997)	"Escrito no Céu" (2004)

Karol G singles chronology
"Si Antes Te Hubiera Conocido" (2024)	"Vivo por Ella" (2024)	"No Me Cansare" (2024)

"Vivo per lei" (Italian pronunciation: [ˈviːvo per ˈlɛi]; English: "I Live for Her") is a 1995 song recorded by Italian artist Andrea Bocelli as a duet with Italian singer Giorgia, released on his album Bocelli. The song was also released as a duet with other female artists, including Marta Sánchez in Spanish and Latin American countries; Hélène Ségara in francophone countries; Judy Weiss in German-speaking countries; Sandy in Brazilian Portuguese; and Bonnie Tyler in English under the title "Live for Love", though due to record company disputes their version was never released. The English version of the song was performed with Heather Headley and was released on Bocelli's live album Vivere Live in Tuscany.

The version with Marta Sánchez, titled "Vivo por ella", was included on her album One Step Closer, which peaked at number two in Panama, and number eight in the US Billboard Tropical Songs. This version of the song was also used as the opening theme for the Mexican telenovela Vivo Por Elena. The version with Hélène Ségara was released in December 1997 and became a hit in Belgium (Wallonia) and France, where it reached number one on the charts. It was the fifth single from Ségara's first studio album, Cœur de verre. The version with Judy Weiss also topped the charts in Switzerland in 1997.

A new version of "Vivo por ella" was released in August 2024 with Colombian artist Karol G as the second single from Bocelli's upcoming compilation album Duets (30th Anniversary).

== Song information ==
The song in Italian was originally written by the group O.R.O. (Manzani – Mengalli – Zelli) in 1995 for their album Vivo per.... The song won the "Disco per l'estate" edition of that year. During the same year, the lyrics of the song were rewritten, still in Italian, by Gatto Panceri and the song was relaunched as a duet between Andrea Bocelli and Giorgia. The new lyrics were characterized by the fact that lei ("her") in the title referred to music whereas in the original song lei referred to a girl.

Thus the new version of Vivo per lei became a tribute to music using the pronoun in the title: lei in Italian, ella in Spanish, elle in French, ela in Portuguese, and sie in German, as a metaphor. While the French and German versions have Bocelli singing in Italian, and Ségara and Weiss providing the French and German lyrics respectively, in the Spanish recorded version both Bocelli and Sánchez sing in Spanish, and in the Portuguese version, Bocelli sings in Spanish and Sandy in Portuguese. On live performances of the song, Bocelli may sing exclusively in Italian. The song's piano melody resembles an Elton John composition, like Candle In the Wind, or I Want Love.

For international versions, German lyrics were written by Michael Kunze, French lyrics by Art Mengo, and Spanish lyrics by Luis Gómez-Escolar. There is also a Greek version called Se Thelo edo sung by Dimitra Galani and Giorgos Karadimos.

During Ségara's first tour, the song was performed, but Bocelli was replaced by her Notre-Dame de Paris Co-Star, Bruno Pelletier. This version is available on the live album En concert à l'Olympia, as second track on the second CD. It was also included on Ségara's compilation Le Best of and on Bruno Pelletier's album Sur Scene (2001).

The song was covered in 2004 by Calogero, Chimène Badi and Patrick Fiori on Les Enfoirés' album Les Enfoirés dans l'espace.

== Unreleased version ==
Bonnie Tyler recorded English vocals on the song in 1997, and the song was scheduled to be released as the lead single from her album All in One Voice (1998). It was retitled "Live for Love". Due to disputes between EastWest Records and Sugar Music, their version of the song remains unreleased. In a 2014 interview, Tyler recalled that EastWest asked for more retail royalty points than they agreed following a version Bocelli recorded with Sarah Brightman. Sugar Music refused their demands and terminated the collaboration.

The English version of the song was performed by Bocelli (who performed in Italian) and Heather Headley. Their rendition of the song can be found in Bocelli's live album Vivere Live in Tuscany, originally released in 2007.

== Meaning of the song ==
Panceri and Bocelli's version of the song clearly evokes the tenor's attachment to music as the pillar and love of his life: "I live for her".

The English-speaking listener is challenged to uncover whom the person referred to by lei ("her") is. Italian, and other Romance languages routinely assign gender to all their nouns, whereas English, perhaps with the exception of the use of she or her to refer to ships or bad weather, never uses gendered pronouns to replace nouns that refer to inanimate objects. On first glance, it appears the song refers to a woman, perhaps a lover, as the first verse is sung by Bocelli. The female voice in the second verse suggests that the person is somebody who is respected and loved by both men and women. The lyrics progress to say that "she" is always the protagonist and if there is another life, the singers would devote their lives to her again. Eventually, Bocelli sings, vivo per lei, la musica, "I live for her, music", revealing that the true meaning of the song is about music and how musicians devote their lives to music.

The beauty of the Romance language versions is that they retain their ambiguity due to the possibility that the feminine pronoun may refer to a woman or a girl, or any inanimate object or word that has the feminine gender. The love of a woman thus becomes a true metaphor for Bocelli's love of music.

== Chart performances ==
In France, the song went straight to number 9 on 6 December 1997, and reached number one four weeks later, thus becoming the sixth bilingual number-one singles in France. It topped the chart for five consecutive weeks, then dropped slowly, remaining for 22 weeks in the top ten, 33 weeks in the top 50 and 42 weeks in the top 100. It was certified Platinum by the SNEP. In Belgium (Wallonia), the single debuted at number 18 on 20 December and achieved number one in its sixth week and stayed there for five weeks, then dropped and fell off the top ten after 15 weeks and the top 40 after 28 weeks. To date, it is the best-selling single for Ségara, and the second one for Bocelli (the first is "Con te partirò").

In Switzerland, the version with Judy Weiss entered the chart at number six on 27 April 1997. It hit number one for one week and remained for 26 weeks in the top 50. The song achieved moderate success in Austria where it peaked at number 22 on 18 May 1997 and fell off the top 40 after ten weeks.

== Track listings ==
Italy

CD single

No.	Title	Length
1.	"Vivo per lei"	4:23
2.	"Vivo per lei – Ich lebe für sie" (by Andrea Bocelli and Judy Weiss)	4:23

Francophone countries

CD single

No.	Title	Length
1.	"Vivo per lei (je vis pour elle)"	4:23
2.	"Voglio restare così" (by Andrea Bocelli)	3:51

Digital download

No.	Title	Length
1.	"Vivo per lei (je vis pour elle)"	4:23
2.	"Vivo per lei (je vis pour elle)" (live at the Olympia, by Hélène Ségara and Bruno Pelletier)	4:32

German-speaking countries

CD single

No.	Title	Length
1.	"Vivo per lei – Ich lebe für sie"	4:23
2.	"Voglio restare così" (by Andrea Bocelli)	3:51

Brazilian Portuguese version

CD single

No.	Title	Length
1.	"Vivo por Ella" (featuring Sandy)	4:20

== Charts and sales ==
=== Weekly charts ===
==== Italian version with Giorgia ====
Chart (1996–2006)	Peak position
Italy (FIMI)	43
Netherlands (Dutch Top 40 Tipparade)	3
Netherlands (Single Top 100)	39

==== German version with Judy Weiss ====
Chart (1997)	Peak position
Austria (Ö3 Austria Top 40)	22
Germany (GfK)	45
Switzerland (Schweizer Hitparade)	1

==== French version with Hélène Ségara ====
Chart (1997–98)	Peak position
Belgium (Ultratop 50 Wallonia)	1
France (SNEP)	1

==== Spanish version with Marta Sánchez ====
Chart (1998)	Peak position
Panama (Notimex)	2
US Hot Latin Songs (Billboard)	16
US Latin Pop Airplay (Billboard)	9
US Tropical Airplay (Billboard)	8

==== Spanish version with Karol G ====
Chart (2024)	Peak position
Colombia Songs (Billboard)	18
Spain (Promusicae)	48
US Hot Latin Songs (Billboard)	41

=== Year-end charts ===
==== German version with Judy Weiss ====
Chart (1997)	Position
Switzerland (Schweizer Hitparade)	8

==== French version with Hélène Ségara ====
Chart (1997)	Position
Belgium (Ultratop Wallonia)	92
France (SNEP)	52
Chart (1998)	Position
Belgium (Ultratop Wallonia)	4
France (SNEP)	6

=== Certifications ===
Region	Certification	Certified units/sales
Belgium (BRMA) Version with Hélène Ségara	Platinum	50,000^{*}
France (SNEP) Version with Hélène Ségara	Platinum	500,000^{*}
Italy (FIMI) Version with Giorgia	Gold	15,000^{*}
^{*} Sales figures based on certification alone.
