= Cœur de verre =

Studio album by Hélène Ségara
- Released: 1996
- Recorded: France
- Genre: Pop
- Label: East West
- Producer: Warner Music France

Hélène Ségara chronology
Cœur de verre (1996)	Au Nom d'une Femme (2000)

Singles from Cœur de verre
- 1. "Je vous aime adieu" Released: April 1996; 2. "Une Voix dans la nuit" Released: 1996; 3. "Les Larmes" Released: 1997; 4. "Auprès de ceux que j'aimais" Released: 1997; 5. "Vivo per lei (je vis pour elle)" Released: December 1997; 6. "Loin du froid de décembre" Released: March 1998; 7. "Vivre" Released: 1998; 8. "Les Vallées d'Irlande" Released: November 1998

Cœur de verre is the name of the first studio album recorded by the French singer Hélène Ségara. It was released in 1996, after its first hit single, "Je vous aime adieu", and achieved success in France and Belgium (Wallonia). It provided eight singles, including three hits.

== Background ==
Three years ago, Ségara had released her first single, "Loin", that passed unnoticed. In 1996, she was in Paris and met the composer Christian Loigerot who wrote eight tracks of her debut album, Cœur de verre. French singer Phil Barney, who had already a solo career in France and a hit in 1987, "Un Enfant de toi", participated in the writing of the song "Vivre dans l'éternité", while the brothers Alain and Marc Nacash, who reached number ten on the French Singles Chart in December 1987 with the single "Elle imagine" under the name of Nacash, wrote to her the hit "Les Vallées d'Irlande" (later they also wrote "Parlez-moi de nous" on Ségara's next album, Au Nom d'une femme). The song "Une Voix dans la nuit" is based on Donna Summer's 1979 hit "On the Radio".

In France, there were eight singles from the album, but only "Je vous aime adieu", "Vivo per lei" (a duet with Andrea Bocelli), "Loin du froid de décembre" and "Les Vallées d'Irlande" were released as CD singles. Except "Loin du froid de décembre" which failed to reach the top 50 (number 54), the other three singles were successful, peaking respectively at number 13 (Gold disc), number one (Platinum disc) and number 15 (Silver disc).

== Chart performances ==
In France, the album was charted about two years after its release. It entered the albums chart on 1 October 1998, in low positions and remained at the bottom of the chart for many months and finally reached the top ten on 20 February 1999, peaking at number six the following week. It then dropped slowly and stayed in the top 50 until 17 July. It totaled eight weeks in the top ten, 32 weeks in the top 50, 56 weeks in the top 100 and 59 weeks in the top 200. It fell off from the chart after 2 March 2002. It achieved Platinum status and was also charted for three weeks on the French Mid Price Chart, peaking at number ten on 6 September 2002.

The album featured for 26 weeks on the Belgian Ultratop Albums Chart (Wallonia), from 6 March to 28 August 1999, including ten weeks in the top 20 and a peak at number 12 in its 12th week.

== Track listing ==
#	Title	Length
1.	"Vivre" (L.Plamondon / R.Cocciante)	3:59
2.	"Les Vallées d'Irlande" (new version) (A.Nacash - N.Godsend / M.Nacash - N.Hardt)	3:37
3.	"Vivo per lei (je vis pour elle)" (duet with Andrea Bocelli) (V.Zelli - M.Mengali - G.Panceri - M.Jourdan)	4:23
4.	"Une voix dans la nuit (On The Radio)" (M.Gatignol / R.Lable)	4:22
5.	"Je vous aime adieu" (H.Ségara - V.Vié / T.Geoffroy - C.Loigerot)	3:55
6.	"Auprès de ceux que j'aimais" (J.P.Lang / T.Geoffroy - C.Loigerot)	3:07
7.	"Les Larmes" (M.Valmur / T.Geoffroy - C.Loigerot)	4:11
8.	"Cœur de verre" (H.Ségara - M.Valmur / T.Geoffroy - C.Loigerot)	3:27
9.	"Loin du froid de décembre" (L.Ahrens / S.Flaherty) Adep. P.Videcoq / É.Gruninger	3:27
10.	"Voyage dans l'éternité" (P.Barney - H.Ségara / P.Barney)	3:48
11.	"Faut rester ensemble" (M.Valmur / T.Geoffroy - C.Loigerot)	3:51
12	"Pour quelques mots" (H.Ségara / N.Godsend - N.Hardt - M.Nacash)	3:35
13	"Des jours et des jours" (H.Ségara - M.Valmur / T.Geoffroy - C.Loigerot)	3:55
14	"J'ai tendance à rêver" (M.Valmur / T.Goeffroy - C.Loigerot)	4:11
15	"Oublie-moi" (H.Ségara - M.Valmur / T.Goeffroy - C.Loigerot)	3:52
16	"Les Mots, les Gestes" (E.Aerts / R.Lable)	4:14

== Personnel ==
- Arrangements, programmations : Hervé Le Duc, Quentin B.

Except : 1 : R.Cocciante, S.Perathoner, J.Top; 2 : Sandro Abaldonato; 3 : Mauro Malavasi, Joe Amoruso, Ignazio Orlando; 9 : Stéphane Huguenin, Yves Sana

- Recording and mixing : Laurent Gatignol, assisted by Quentin B.

Except : 1 : Manu Guiot, G.Brown; 2, 9 : Thierry Rogen, Orlando; 3 : Mauro Malavasi, Ignazio Orlando

- Musical direction : Hervé Le Duc, Quentin B., Laurent Gatignol (except 1, 2, 3, 9)
- Studios : Papa Bravo, Musika, Studio Plus XXX, Clock Studio, Palais des Congrès, Fonoprint, Mega, Artistic Palace Boulogne
- Engraving and mastering : Tony Cousins Studio Metropolis Mastering (London)
- Production : Fabrizio Salvadori for Auréa Music

Except : 2, 3, 9 : Orlando, Antoine Angelelli, Mauro Malavasi for Caterina Caselli Sugar

- Executive producer : Michèle Torpedine
- Artistique direction : Orlando, Antoine Angelelli
- Musicians :
  - Bass : Janick Top
  - Drum kit : Claude Salmieri
  - Keyboards : Hervé Le Duc, Quentin B.
  - Guitars : Jean-François Oricelli, Denys Lable
- Background vocals : Marielle Hervé, Christelle M'Barga
- Photos : Olivier Grimonet, Bernard Mouillon, Christophe Majani D'Inguimbert
- Design : Anthony Bascoul
- Make up : Fatiha Maghraoui

== Charts and sales ==
Chart (1998–2002)	Peak position
Belgian (Wallonia) Albums Chart	12
French Albums Chart	6

Region	Certification	Certified units/sales
France (SNEP)	Platinum	300,000^{*}
^{*} Sales figures based on certification alone.
