= Anne Gravoin =

French violinist (born 1965)

- Born: 4 November 1965 (age 61); Montauban, France
- Education: Conservatoire de Paris
- Occupation: Concert violinist
- Spouses: 1. Jacques Beneich, photographer; 2. Manuel Valls, politician; (m. 2010)

Anne Gravoin (born 4 November 1965) is a French concert violinist and music entrepreneur.

In 2010 she married Manuel Valls, who served between 2014 and 2016 as Prime Minister of France. However, in April 2018 Valls announced their separation.

== Life and career ==
Gravoin was born in south-west France at Montauban where two generations earlier Dr Corenfeld, her maternal grandfather, had settled after completing his medical studies at Strasbourg. He had emigrated from the Soviet part of Moldavia, then the Moldavian Autonomous Soviet Socialist Republic, in order to escape the predations of Stalinism. Anne Gravoin's mother became an English teacher. Her father, whose family came from Bourbonnais in the centre of the country, was a professional violinist with the Radio France Philharmonic Orchestra. Six months after her birth the family relocated from Montauban to the Paris suburb of La Varenne-Saint-Hilaire.

She studied at the Conservatoire de Paris where her teachers included Gérard Poulet, Dominique Hoppenot, and Myriam Solovieff. She won a first prize as a violinist and for her participation in chamber music.

In 1984 she started working with musician-singers such as Laurent Voulzy, Marc Lavoine and Michel Jonasz. She was the violin soloist with the "Archets Européens" ("European Bows") in 1989, with the Tours based Orchestra of Central France between 2001 and 2004, and of the "Orchestra of the Paris Conservatoire prize-winners" in 2004. She has been a member of the Menuhin Foundation since 1986. In 2007 she founded a string quartet, the Travelling Quartet.

In 2000 Gravoin established "Régie Orchestre" (RO), one of the three largest organisations of its kind in the Paris region, and which works with musicians, mostly on short term contracts, to provide and coordinate orchestral support and collaboration, both domestically and outside France. Each year more than 400 musicians are employed. Major projects include orchestral backing for Johnny Hallyday tours, and on recording albums with artists such as Françoise Hardy, Nolwenn Leroy, Alain Souchon and Laurent Voulzy. The RO has also been collaborating on various film scores with composers such as Tôn-Thât Tiêt et Vladimir Cosma.

In 2013 the "Régie Orchestre" joined the team of musicians for the high-profile television programme "Chabada" presented by Daniela Lumbroso. In 2013 and 2014 it participated in the lengthy "Sur le chemin" ("On the road") tour of Emmanuel Moire, which took in more than 70 concerts across France, Switzerland and Belgium.

=== Personal life ===
A daughter from her first marriage, Juliette, was born in 1992.
