= 1980–1985 The New Mix in One Go =

Remix album by Yello
- Released: March 17, 1986
- Labels: Vertigo (most of the world), Mercury (UK), Barclay (France)
- Producer: Yello

Yello chronology
Stella (1985)	1980–1985 The New Mix in One Go (1986)	One Second (1987)

Professional ratings
Review scores
Source	Rating
AllMusic	3/5 stars
Smash Hits	8/10
Sounds	4.5/5 stars

1980–1985 The New Mix in One Go is a compilation of remixed songs by the Swiss band Yello. It was released on March 17, 1986. The album peaked at No. 99 in Australia on the Kent Music Report chart in December 1986.

== Track listing ==
1. "Daily Disco"
2. "Swing"
3. "The Evening's Young"
4. "Pinball Cha Cha"
5. "I Love You"
6. "Vicious Games"
7. "Sometimes (Dr. Hirsch)"
8. "Base for Alec"
9. "Oh Yeah"
10. "Lost Again"
11. "Tub Dub"
12. "Angel No"
13. "Desire"
14. "Bananas to the Beat"
15. "Koladi-Ola"
16. "Domingo"
17. "Bostich"
18. "Live at the Roxy"

== Personnel ==
- Composed by, Arranged by – Boris Blank
- Cover – Ernst Gamper
- Drums – Beat Ash
- Guitar – Chico Hablas
- Lyrics by, Vocals – Dieter Meier
- Mixed by [Mixing Assistance] – Ian Tregoning, Ursli Weber
- Photography by – Anton Corbijn
- Producer, Engineer [Engineered by] – Yello

== Certifications ==
Region	Certification	Certified units/sales
Germany (BVMI)	Gold	250,000^{^}
Switzerland (IFPI Switzerland)	Gold	25,000^{^}
^{^} Shipments figures based on certification alone.
