= Oh Yeah! (2025 film) =

- Directed by: Nick Canfield
- Produced by: Nick Canfield
- Cinematography: Nick Canfield; Richard Bakewell; Nelson Walker III; Ben Westaway
- Edited by: Paul Lovelace
- Production company: XTR
- Distributed by: Documentary+ Originals; Rolling Stone Films
- Release date: June 7, 2025 (Tribeca Festival)
- Running time: 17 minutes
- Country: United States
- Language: English

Oh Yeah! is a 2025 American short documentary film about the band Yello and their iconic song "Oh Yeah". The film is shot, produced, and directed by Nick Canfield.

== Production ==
In 2023, Canfield launched a Kickstarter campaign to raise $15,000 to complete the film. It was successful as the $16,590 was raised.

== Release ==
The film was acquired by Documentary+ Originals and Rolling Stone Films. It premiered at the Tribeca Festival on June 7, 2025. It was shown at DOC NYC on November 13, 2025, and was given a streaming release on November 25, 2025.

== See also ==
- Ferris Bueller's Day Off - song famously used in the 1986 John Hughes classic
