= Stella (album) =

Studio album by Yello
- Released: 29 January 1985
- Recorded: 1983–1984
- Studios: Yello Studio, Zürich
- Genres: Synth-pop; disco
- Length: 40:58
- Labels: Vertigo (Europe); Elektra (UK); Mercury (US)
- Producer: Yello

Yello chronology
You Gotta Say Yes to Another Excess (1983)	Stella (1985)	1980–1985 The New Mix in One Go (1986)

Singles from Stella
- 1. "Let Me Cry" Released: 9 August 1983 (GER); 2. "Vicious Games" Released: 27 February 1985; 3. "Desire" Released: 4 June 1985; 4. "Oh Yeah" Released: 11 July 1985

Stella is the fourth studio album by the Swiss electronic band Yello, first released in Germany, Switzerland and Austria on 29 January 1985, and in the UK and US in March 1985. It was the first album made by the band without founder member Carlos Perón.

As well as becoming the first album ever by a Swiss group to top the Swiss album chart, it was the band's breakthrough album internationally, helped by the success of the song "Oh Yeah", which gained the band worldwide attention the following year after it was prominently featured in the 1986 film Ferris Bueller's Day Off and then a year later in The Secret of My Success.

== Composition and writing ==
Some of the songs and themes of Stella had begun as part of an operatic stage show titled Snowball that Meier had started developing in 1983. He told the US magazine Trouser Press that the outline of the show was "Boris Blank plays a medieval magician/musician whose songs have an almost Rasputin-like influence over his listeners. The powers that be consider him so dangerous that they banish him to a sealed-in mountain cave. So that he doesn't go mad from sensory deprivation, he must resort to the powerful imagery of his music. The show gets its title from those little water-and-scenery filled trinkets that 'snow' when shaken. The magician uses one of these 'snowballs' as a sort of surrogate crystal ball." In the end Blank felt he was not a good enough actor to play the lead role, and Meier abandoned plans to put on Snowball as a stage show due to costs. After reworking the plot and changing the title to Lightmaker, the project eventually appeared as a film in 2001.

Certain aspects of the Snowball project were retained for the band's new album, including its title. Meier told the Dutch music magazine Vinyl in an interview in April 1985 that the name for the album had been inspired by one of the characters from Snowball, saying, "Stella is a character of fiction. The idea is that it is a hysterical singer, sitting in a stalactite cave near Capri, singing his insane arias." The track "Stalakdrama" was intended to be the show's opening overture.

Blank said that the name of the track "Koladi-ola" came from a lion's roar that he had recorded from an album of animal sounds: after pitching the roar up one octave he believed that this is what the roar sounded like phonetically.

Meier explained the story behind "Domingo", saying, "Domingo is a false preacher who, with a few sentences, is trying to impress the people there, and then the choir chants 'Domingo, you showed us just nothing like no one before', it means 'you didn't show us anything either, it's all nonsense what you said, but somehow you did it right'. Domingo de Santa Clara actually existed. There was an Abraham a Sancta Clara, he was some religious fanatic. I don't know where I got it from, but the name pleased me very much: Abraham a Sancta Clara. And since the name Domingo pleases me as well, I called him Domingo."

Describing the composition of "Oh Yeah", the album's best known track, Blank said, "First I did the music and then I invited Dieter to sing along, and he came up with some lines which I thought, 'no Dieter, it's too complicated, we don't need that many lyrics'. I had the idea of just this guy, a fat little monster sits there very relaxed and says, "Oh yeah, oh yeah". So I told him, 'Why don't you try just to sing on and on 'oh yeah'?... Dieter was very angry when I told him this and he said, 'are you crazy, all the time "Oh yeah"? Are you crazy?! I can't do this, no no, come on, come on.' And then he said, 'some lyrics, like "the moon... beautiful", is this too much?!' and I said, 'no, it's OK', and then he did this 'oh yeah' and at the end he thought, 'yeah it's nice', he loved it himself also. And also I wanted to install lots of human noises, all kind of phonetic rhythms with my mouth; you hear lots of noises in the background which are done with my mouth." In a 2020 interview with Great Big Story, Meier claimed that Blank asked him to imagine himself as the king of Tonga relaxing on a beach, and that his vocals were derived from how he thought such a figure would act in this situation.

The song "Blue Nabou" started life as a piece of advertising music commissioned for the soft drink Orangina in France in 1984. This was developed into a track originally intended for inclusion on Stella, but was eventually used as a B-side instead.

== Production ==
Recording took place from mid-1983 to mid-1984 at the band's Yello Studio on the shore of Lake Zurich. Blank had purchased two new synthesizers in 1983, a Yamaha DX7 and a Roland JX-3P, but the album was mostly written and created using the equipment he already owned, a Fairlight CMI Series II sampler along with an ARP Odyssey synthesizer, the Linn LM-1 and Oberheim DMX drum machines, a Roland VP-330 Vocoder Plus, a Lexicon Hall reverb unit and a Framus guitar.

With the album ready to be mixed, Yello decided to try the new digital mixing process instead of the standard analogue process, and in August 1984 they visited Hartmann Digital Studio in Untertrubach Germany where engineer Tom Thiel began mixing the album. However, Yello abruptly cancelled the sessions after just ten days, unhappy with the sound of the album. Meier explained that the duo felt that the songs were losing their soul, saying, "Getting technically more experienced was leading us onto a slick perfectionist track. We even went to a German digital studio to do the most perfect remixes on a digital machine with the SSL Desk and the rest of it. And we had to learn, a difficult process for us, that perfection is just a way to escape from having nothing to say... With Stella we were being dragged down by an excess of perfection." Blank later said, "All the balances were wrong and the dynamic was lost, so I did lots of remixes again in Zürich to save this album". The group returned to their studios in Zürich and Blank started the process of remixing the tracks himself, with the exception of "Desert Inn" which he felt was acceptable as it was, "Blue Nabou" which the duo had already decided would not appear on the album and hence there was no urgency to improve it, and "Angel No" because Blank did not have time to mix it to the standard that he wanted. With the delay in mixing, the album's provisional release date of 1 October 1984 could not be met, and in order to avoid being lost among the Christmas releases, a new release date in January 1985 was set.

An undated cassette tape found at Yello Office contained 14 tracks recorded for the Stella album. Many of the tracks are longer than the versions that eventually appeared on the album, and some of the songs have different titles. "The Race" is not the song that appeared as a single in 1988 and on the Flag album, but an early version of "Desert Inn", named after a line in the lyrics.

== Release ==
Stella was first released in Germany, Switzerland and Austria on vinyl LP on 29 January 1985, and on cassette and CD a week later on 5 February in the same three countries, before being released worldwide in March 1985. In Europe the album was released on the Vertigo or Mercury Records labels (depending on the country), both labels being imprints of the Phonogram Records group. In the UK Yello's record label Stiff Records was in the process of going into administration, so the album was licensed to Elektra Records. In the US the album was first released by Elektra and later reissued by Mercury.

Two singles were originally released from Stella, both of them after the album's release. "Vicious Games" was released on 27 February 1985, with a video shot in Yello's Rote Fabrik (Red Factory) working space, featuring Blank and actress Mirjam Montandon miming to Winters' vocals (Winters was not available for the video shoot).

The second single, "Desire", was released on 4 June 1985. Meier's friend, Swiss TV station owner Paul Grau, had suggested that the video should be shot in Havana in Cuba to match the song's Latin sound, and the video, which included three orchestras and around 150 dancers, was filmed there in May 1985. Yello's stay in Cuba was filmed by a German TV station for a documentary, Yello auf Kuba (Yello in Cuba), and the duo were also accompanied on the trip by photographer Anton Corbijn: some of his photographs appeared on the back cover of the single and in the booklet for the 2005 reissue of Stella. The song was later used in the Miami Vice episode "Killshot" in 1986, and in the film Dutch in 1991.

No further singles were planned to be released from Stella, but in 1986 Yello fan and film director John Hughes asked permission to use the track "Oh Yeah" in his new film Ferris Bueller's Day Off. Featured during a scene involving a Ferrari 250 GT, and again over the closing credits sequence, interest in the track caused "Oh Yeah" to be released in the US in July 1986. It was eventually released as a single in Europe in September 1987, following the song's appearance in a second Hollywood film, The Secret of My Success.

=== Artwork ===
The cover of the album was created by the Zürich artist Ernst Gamper, with whom Yello had been working since 1982. Gamper painted the picture of a face on a sheet of celluloid, which he then taped to the window of his studio overlooking Lake Zurich and photographed at sunset, with the setting sun shining through the unpainted eye to create a 'glowing eye' effect. The CD inlay booklet featured a photograph of Blank and Meier standing by the same window, with the painting visible on the window between them.

== Critical reception ==
Professional ratings
Review scores
Source	Rating
AllMusic	4.5/5 stars
Mojo	(2005 reissue)
Record Mirror	5/5 stars
Sounds	5/5 stars

The album received mixed reviews from the UK music press. In Record Mirror Betty Page enthused, "This picks up where [You Gotta Say Yes to Another Excess] left off, taking its themes and mashing them up, pointing them in new, exciting directions... An album of moods and atmospheres, it must be listened to at maximum volume in a very dark room. Bliss." Kevin Murphy of Sounds declared that "Yello's wry, pulsating melodramas lavish themselves on Stella in a sensuous escapade, leaving no room for faint hearts or lovers. Each haunting episode reeks of a sublime suspense with a liberal coating of electric eccentricity. Mellow moods are savaged by impassioned cries and discordant desires as humour seeps from vital pores." Martin Aston of Melody Maker was less impressed, saying, "Their slick marriage... no, make it a steamy affair, between accessible splicing montage methods and sophisticated disco has the necessary balance of artifice and sweet melody, crisp danceateria [sic] moves and conceptual laziness (posing as artful dodging) that could conceivably pull the wool over people's eyes... Post-Fairlight, Yello are clever, sometimes too clever-clever, occasionally jarring as the montaging lays code upon codas." The most critical review came from Ian Penman in NME, who stated that avant-garde art should not appear perfect, as Stella did, and that "the various whispered or wailing 'mood pieces' of Stella strike me as branded and bandied about with a rather familiar complacency". He concluded that the record "has no fuzziness, no loose threads, its metronome beat has nothing of the layered bliss of funk".

Reviewing all six reissued Yello albums in 2005, Ian Harrison of Mojo stated that Stella "saw further refinements in sound [to You Gotta Say Yes to Another Excess] and a more pronounced Euro-pop agenda, but however slick tracks like 'Oh Yeah' or 'Vicious Games' might be, it's never entirely comfortable listening". AllMusic's John Bush believed that Stella was Yello's "best single LP, an excellent production throughout by Boris Blank, from the theatric instrumentals 'Stalakdrama' and 'Ciel Ouvert' to the frenetic pitched percussion on 'Let Me Cry'. As well, Dieter Meier proves he's at his best vocally, whether it's the seamy side of life on 'Desert Inn' or an exaggerated leer for 'Koladi-ola'. Both hit their peak on the same album, and Stella is a complete joy for fans of the vocal or production side of the group."

== Track listing ==
All tracks are written by Boris Blank (music) & Dieter Meier (lyrics), except "Koladi-ola" lyrics by Boris Blank.

Side A
No.	Title	Length
1.	"Desire"	3:42
2.	"Vicious Games"	4:30
3.	"Oh Yeah"	3:05
4.	"Desert Inn"	3:30
5.	"Stalakdrama"	3:02
6.	"Koladi-ola"	2:55

Side B
No.	Title	Length
7.	"Domingo"	4:30
8.	"Sometimes (Dr. Hirsch)"	3:33
9.	"Let Me Cry"	3:34
10.	"Ciel Ouvert"	5:20
11.	"Angel No"	3:06
Total length:		40:58

2005 reissue bonus tracks
No.	Title	Length
12.	"Blue Nabou" (B-side of "Vicious Games" single)	3:19
13.	"Oh Yeah" (Indian Summer Version)	5:30
14.	"Desire" (12" Mix)	6:54
15.	"Vicious Games" (12" Mix)	6:00
Total length:		62:41

- Note: On the back cover of the LP version of the album, "Koladi-ola" is listed as "Koladi-ola (Low Blow)". This subtitle is missing from the label on the vinyl disc and from all cassette and CD versions of the album.

== Personnel ==
Yello

- Dieter Meier – lead vocals and backing vocals
- Boris Blank – lead vocals on "Koladi-ola", backing vocals on "Desire", "Oh Yeah", "Domingo", "Sometimes (Dr. Hirsch)" and "Let Me Cry", synthesizer, vocoder, sampler, drum machines y electric guitar

Additional personnel

- Beat Ash – hi-hat on "Desire" and "Angel No"
- Chico Hablas – electric guitar on "Desire", "Vicious Games", "Desert Inn", "Koladi-ola" and "Domingo"
- Annie Hogan – piano on "Blue Nabou"
- Rush Winters – lead vocals on "Vicious Games" and "Angel No"
- Petia Kaufman^{†} – glass harp

Although Petia Kaufman is credited as playing glass harp on the album, her contribution was not used on the final mix.

Production

- Produced by Boris Blank and Yello
- Recorded and engineered by Tom Thiel and Yello
- Mixed by Ian Tregoning

== Chart performance ==
Chart (1985)	Peak position
Austrian Albums (Ö3 Austria)	23
German Albums (Offizielle Top 100)	6
Swedish Albums (Sverigetopplistan)	26
Swiss Albums (Schweizer Hitparade)	1
UK Albums (Official Charts)	92

== Release history ==
Region	Date	Label	Format	Catalog
Europe	29 January 1985	Vertigo	LP	822 820-1
Europe	5 February 1985	Vertigo	cassette	822 820-4
Europe	5 February 1985	Vertigo	CD	822 820-2
United Kingdom	March 1985	Elektra	LP	EKT 1
United Kingdom	March 1985	Elektra	cassette	EKT 1C
United States	March 1985	Elektra	LP	60401-1
United States	March 1985	Elektra	cassette	60401-4
United States	March 1985	Mercury	LP	422 822 820-1
United States	March 1985	Mercury	cassette	422 822 820-4
United States	March 1985	Mercury	CD	822 820-2
United Kingdom; Europe	1988	Mercury	LP	PRICE 116/822 820-1
United Kingdom; Europe	1988	Mercury	cassette	PRIMC 116/822 820-4
Worldwide	30 September 2005	Vertigo; Universal	remastered CD with extra tracks	06024 9830759

== Certifications ==
Region	Certification	Certified units/sales
Germany (BVMI)	Gold	250,000^{^}
^{^} Shipments figures based on certification alone.

== Bibliography ==
Warstad, Jonas (2013). Stella: The Story Behind the Album. CreateSpace Independent Publishing Platform. ISBN 978-1-4949-3420-0.
