= Baracuta =

British clothing brand founded in 1937

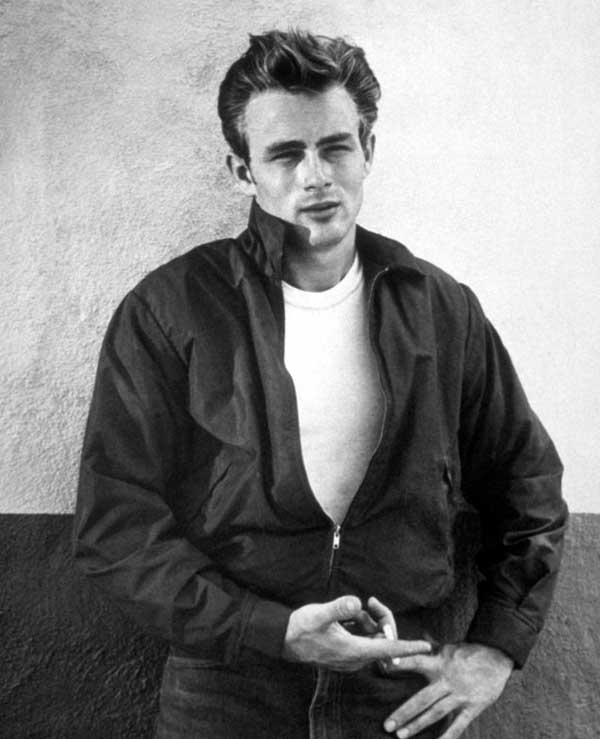
James Dean wearing a Baracuta G9 jacket

Baracuta is a British clothing brand founded in 1937 in Manchester, England by brothers John and Issac Miller. They had previously manufactured rainwear for Aquascutum, Burberry and Marks & Spencer.

The “Harrington jacket” was first produced in the 1930s by Baracuta, officially named G9 ("G" for golf, "9" for nine holes). Baracuta's original design, the G9, is still in production. The brand added a Fraser Tartan lining when Brigadier Simon Fraser of Clan Fraser of Lovat, granted permission to use the pattern.

In 2012, Italian company WP Lavori in Corso acquired the brand.

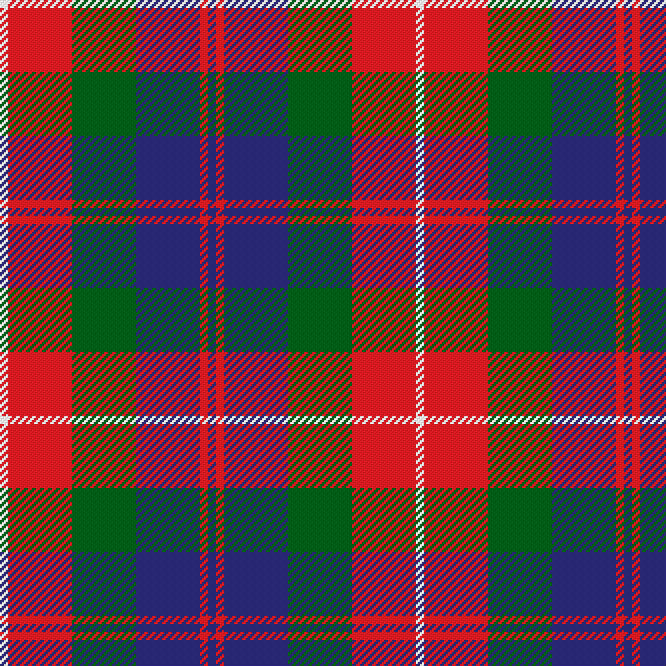
Lovat Tartan adorns the interior of Baracuta garments
