= Ferris Bueller's Day Off =

1986 teen comedy film by John Hughes

- Theatrical release poster
- Directed by: John Hughes
- Written by: John Hughes
- Produced by: John Hughes; Tom Jacobson
- Starring: Matthew Broderick; Mia Sara; Alan Ruck
- Cinematography: Tak Fujimoto
- Edited by: Paul Hirsch
- Music by: Ira Newborn
- Distributed by: Paramount Pictures
- Release date: June 11, 1986 (United States)
- Running time: 103 minutes
- Country: United States
- Language: English
- Budget: $5 million
- Box office: $70.7 million

Ferris Bueller's Day Off is a 1986 American comedy film written, co-produced, and directed by John Hughes. It stars Matthew Broderick, Mia Sara, and Alan Ruck, with supporting roles from Jennifer Grey, Jeffrey Jones, Cindy Pickett, Edie McClurg, Lyman Ward and Charlie Sheen. It tells the story of the eponymous character, a charismatic high school slacker who lives in the suburbs of Chicago and skips school with his best friend Cameron and his girlfriend Sloane for a day, regularly breaking the fourth wall to explain his techniques and inner thoughts.

Hughes wrote the screenplay in less than a week. Filming began in September 1985 and finished in November, featuring many Chicago landmarks including the Sears Tower, Wrigley Field, and the Art Institute of Chicago. The film was Hughes's love letter to Chicago: "I really wanted to capture as much of Chicago as I could. Not just in the architecture and landscape, but the spirit."

Released by Paramount Pictures on June 11, 1986, the film became the tenth-highest-grossing film of 1986 in the United States, grossing $70.7 million over a $5 million budget. The film received generally positive reviews from critics and audiences alike, who praised Broderick's performance, and the film's humor and tone. In 2014, the film was selected for preservation in the United States National Film Registry by the Library of Congress, being deemed "culturally, historically, or aesthetically significant". The film was followed by a television series, starring Charlie Schlatter as the title character.

== Plot ==
Two months before his graduation, high school senior Ferris Bueller fakes illness to stay home from school, regularly breaking the fourth wall to describe his senioritis. While his sister Jeanie sees through the ruse, he fools their parents, Katie and Tom. After learning Ferris has been absent nine times that semester, the school's dean, Edward R. Rooney, and his secretary Grace resolve to expose Ferris's chronic truancy. Ferris hacks into the school's computer system and reduces his absence count to two, making it appear that he attends school regularly.

To excuse Ferris's girlfriend Sloane Peterson from school, he persuades his hypochondriac best friend Cameron Frye to impersonate Sloane's father and call the school with claims that her grandmother died. Knowing Sloane is dating Ferris, Rooney feels suspicious and responds dismissively. Ferris simultaneously calls the school to confirm his absence, fooling Rooney into believing he offended Sloane's father. When picking up Sloane, Ferris disguises himself as her father and borrows the prized possession of Cameron's father, a 1961 Ferrari 250 GT California Spyder. However, Rooney becomes suspicious upon seeing Sloane kiss Ferris. Fearing his father's wrath, Cameron becomes paranoid when Ferris takes the car on a day trip into Chicago, even with assurances of preserving its condition and original odometer mileage.

Ferris, Cameron, and Sloane leave the car with two parking attendants, who promptly take it on a long joyride. The three visit the Sears Tower observatory, eat lunch at an upscale restaurant, visit the Chicago Mercantile Exchange and the Art Institute of Chicago, go to a Chicago Cubs baseball game, and attend the Von Steuben Day Parade, where Ferris jumps on a float and lip syncs to "Danke Schoen" by Wayne Newton and "Twist and Shout" by the Beatles. They manage to hide from his father, who works in the city.

Meanwhile, Rooney prowls the Bueller home for Ferris, becoming victim to some pratfalls and pursued by the family's pet Rottweiler. When Jeanie skips class and returns home to confront Ferris, she discovers a dummy in his bed, and finds Rooney there. Mistaking him for a burglar, she knocks him unconscious by kicking him in the face and calls the police. Rooney regains consciousness and leaves the house upon noticing his car being towed. The police arrest Jeanie, believing she prank called the police station. While detained, she befriends a young delinquent who advises her to worry less about Ferris's exploits and more about her own life.

Upon collecting the Ferrari and heading home, Ferris and Cameron discover that the car's mileage has significantly increased. Cameron enters semi-catatonic shock, later almost drowning in a pool before a worried Ferris helps him. At Cameron's house, Ferris jacks up the car and puts it in reverse gear to unsuccessfully attempt to rewind the odometer. Angry toward his domineering father, Cameron kicks the car's bumper until the jacks collapse and it crashes backward through the garage wall, suffering severe damage. Ferris offers to take the blame, but Cameron declines and insists on standing up to his father. After walking Sloane home, Ferris runs through the neighborhood to return home before his family does. He is nearly hit by Jeanie's car as she and Katie drive home from the police station. Ferris escapes Katie's notice, but Jeanie spots him and tries to beat him home, only to be pulled over and given a speeding ticket.

Ferris arrives home first, but Rooney confronts him before he can return indoors. Seeing both of them through the window, Jeanie has a change of heart and allows Ferris to come inside before their parents do, claiming that he was at the hospital for his illness. She also shows Rooney his wallet that had fallen from his pocket in the kitchen earlier, tosses it into a nearby puddle, and shuts the back door loud enough to wake up the Rottweiler, who attacks and chases Rooney away. Upon seeing Ferris in bed, Katie and Tom believe he has been home all day. Meanwhile, a humiliated Rooney reluctantly accepts a ride on a school bus filled with students who act derisively toward him.

== Cast ==
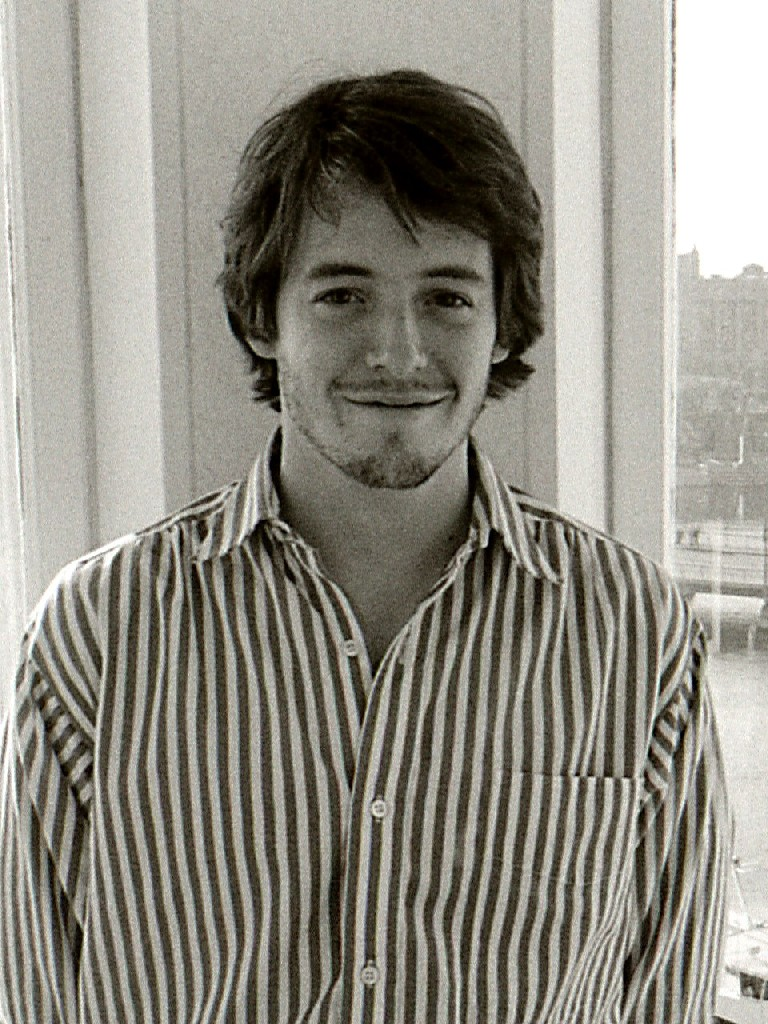
Broderick in Sweden during his promotion of Ferris Bueller's Day Off, June 1986

- Matthew Broderick as Ferris Bueller, a popular high school senior
- Alan Ruck as Cameron Frye, Ferris' best friend
- Mia Sara as Sloane Peterson, Ferris' girlfriend
- Jeffrey Jones as Edward "Ed" R. Rooney, the Dean of Students
- Jennifer Grey as Jeanie Bueller, Ferris' sister
- Cindy Pickett as Katie Bueller, Ferris' mother
- Lyman Ward as Tom Bueller, Ferris' father
- Edie McClurg as Grace Wheelberg, Rooney's secretary
- Charlie Sheen as Garth Volbeck, the juvenile delinquent who flirts with Jeanie in the police station
- Ben Stein as Ferris' sardonic economics teacher. Stein used his actual experience as an economist to improvise much of his dialogue.
- Del Close as the English teacher
- Virginia Capers as Florence Sparrow, the school nurse
- Richard Edson as a garage attendant
- Larry "Flash" Jenkins as the garage attendant's co-pilot
- Kristy Swanson as an economics student
- Max Perlich as an economics student
- Scott Coffey as an economics student
- Anne Ryan as Shermerite
- Jonathan Schmock as Chez Quis Maitre D'
- Louie Anderson as a flower delivery person
- Stephanie Blake as a singing telegram "nurse"
- Dee Dee Rescher as a bus driver who picks up Rooney during the end credits
- Joey D. Vieira as a pizza man

John Hughes made his final on-screen appearance in an uncredited cameo role as a man running between the cabs.

== Production ==
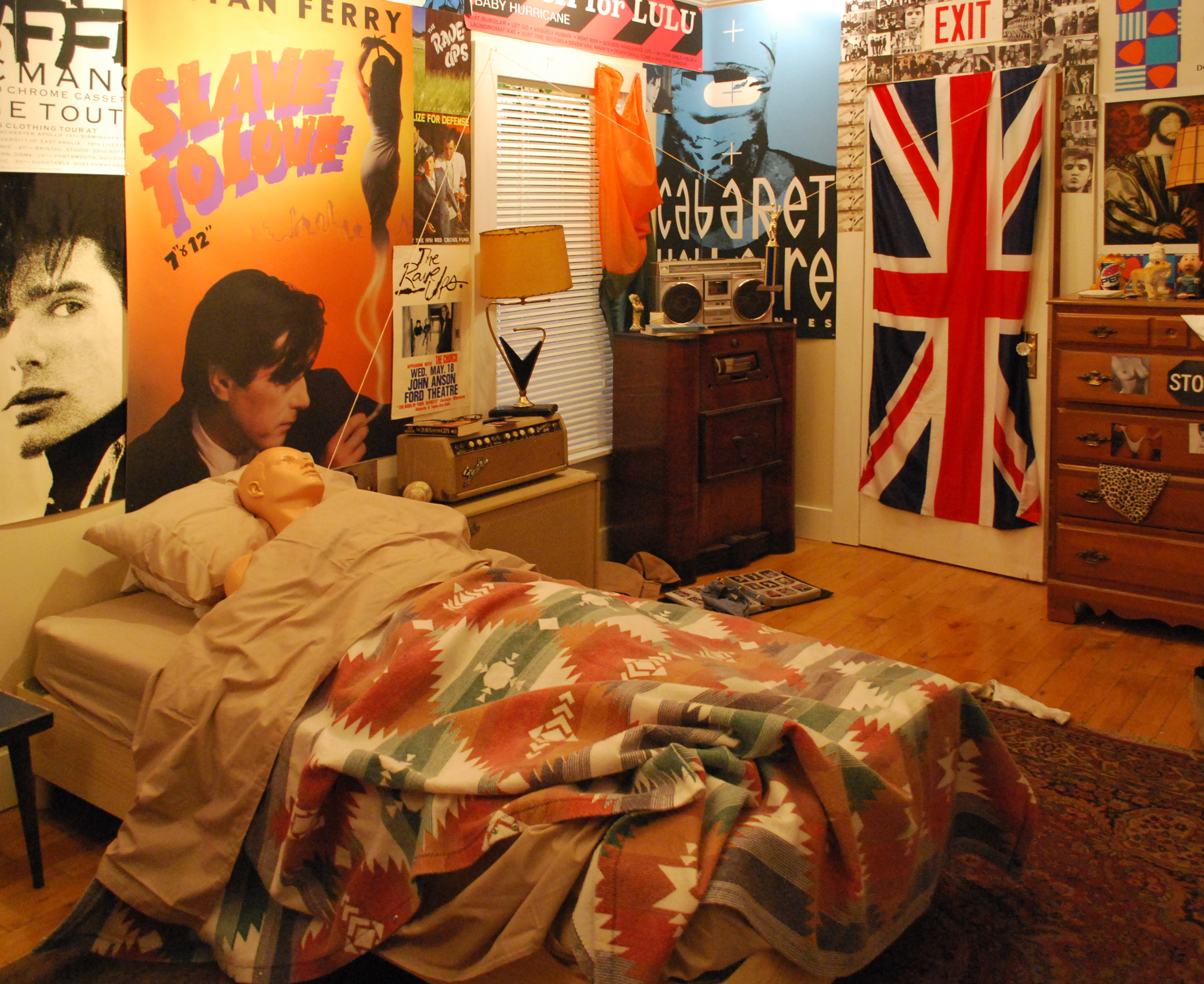
A replica of Ferris Bueller's bedroom recreated by Sarah Keenlyside at the Gladstone Hotel in 2016.

=== Writing ===
As he was writing the film in 1985, John Hughes kept track of his progress in a spiral-bound logbook. He noted that the basic storyline was developed on February 25 and was successfully pitched the following day to Paramount Studios chief Ned Tanen. Tanen was intrigued by the concept, but wary that the Writers Guild of America was hours away from picketing the studio. Hughes wrote the screenplay in less than a week.

Editor Paul Hirsch explained that Hughes had a trance-like concentration to his script-writing process, working for hours on end, and would later shoot the film on essentially what was his first draft of the script. "The first cut of Ferris Bueller's Day Off ended up at two hours, 45 minutes. The shortening of the script had to come in the cutting room", said Hirsch. "Having the story episodic and taking place in one day...meant the characters were wearing the same clothes. I suspect that Hughes writes his scripts with few, if any costume changes just so he can have that kind of freedom in the editing." Costume designer Marilyn Vance and Hughes came up with Bueller's signature outfit with some input from Broderick. "There's details you don’t even see," Broderick explained. "My socks had flags of all the nations on them. The rabbit’s foot in my pocket was just there. John thought Ferris's leather coat should be simple, like James Dean's red jacket (from Rebel Without a Cause) but we went very much the other way. The beret was my idea."

Hughes intended to focus more on the characters rather than the plot. "I know how the movie begins, I know how it ends", said Hughes. "I don't ever know the rest, but that doesn't seem to matter. It's not the events that are important, it's the characters going through the event. Therefore, I make them as full and real as I can. This time around, I wanted to create a character who could handle everyone and everything."

Edward McNally was rumored as the inspiration for the character Ferris Bueller. McNally grew up on the same street as Hughes, had a best friend named "Buehler", and was relentlessly pursued by the school dean over his truancy, which amounted to 27 days' absence, compared to Bueller's nine in the film.

=== Casting ===
Hughes said that he had Matthew Broderick in mind when he wrote the screenplay, saying Broderick was the only actor he could think of who could pull off the role, calling him clever and charming. "Certain guys would have played Ferris and you would have thought, 'Where's my wallet?'" Hughes said. "I had to have that look; that charm had to come through. Jimmy Stewart could have played Ferris at 15...I needed Matthew." Anthony Michael Hall, who had worked with Hughes on three previous films, was offered the part but turned it down as he was busy with other projects. Other actors who were considered for the role included Jim Carrey, John Cusack, Jon Cryer, Johnny Depp, George Clooney, Tom Cruise, and Michael J. Fox.

Mia Sara surprised Hughes when she auditioned for the role of Sloane Peterson. "It was funny," she said. "He didn't know how old I was and said he wanted an older girl to play the 17-year-old. He said it would take someone older to give her the kind of dignity she needed. He almost fell out of his chair when I told him I was only 18." Molly Ringwald, who had also wanted to play Sloane, said, "John wouldn't let me do it: he said that the part wasn't big enough for me."

Alan Ruck had auditioned for the role of Bender in The Breakfast Club that went to Judd Nelson, but Hughes remembered Ruck and cast him as the 17-year-old Cameron Frye. Hughes based the character of Cameron on a friend of his in high school: "He was sort of a lost person. His family neglected him, so he took that as license to really pamper himself. When he was legitimately sick, he actually felt good, because it was difficult and tiring to have to invent diseases but when he actually had something, he was relaxed." Ruck said the role of Cameron had been offered to Emilio Estevez, who turned it down. "Every time I see Emilio, I want to kiss him," said Ruck. "Thank you!" Prior to Ruck's casting, Cryer was also considered for the role.

Ruck, then 29, worried about the age difference (he was only six years younger than Hughes). "I was worried that I'd be 10 years out of step, and I wouldn't know anything about what was cool, what was hip, all that junk. But when I was going to high school, I didn't know any of that stuff then, either. So I just thought, well, hell—I'll just be me. The character, he's such a loner that he really wouldn't give a damn about that stuff anyway. He'd feel guilty that he didn't know it, but that's it." Ruck was not surprised to find himself cast young. "No, because, really, when I was 18, I sort of looked 12," he said. "Maybe it's a genetic imbalance."

Ruck and Broderick had previously acted together in the Broadway production of Biloxi Blues. Cameron's "Mr. Peterson" voice was an in-joke imitation of their former director Gene Saks. Ruck felt at ease working with Broderick, often sleeping in his trailer. "We didn't have to invent an instant friendship like you often have to do in a movie," said Ruck. "We were friends."

Jones was cast as Rooney based on his role in Amadeus, where he played the emperor; Hughes thought that character's modern equivalent was Rooney. "My part was actually quite small in the script, but what seemed to be the important part to me was that I was the only one who wasn't swept along by Ferris," recalls Jones. "So I was the only one in opposition, which presented a lot of opportunities, some of which weren't even in the script or were expanded on. John was receptive to anything I had to offer, and indeed got ideas along the way himself. So that was fun, working with him." "Hughes told me at the time—and I thought he was just blowing his own horn—he said, 'You are going to be known for this for the rest of your life.' And I thought, 'Sure'... but he was right." To help Jones study for the part, Hughes took him to meet his old vice principal. "This is the guy I want you to pay close attention to," Jones explained to Hughes's biographer Kirk Honeycutt. While meeting him, the VP's coat momentarily flew open revealing a holster and gun attached to the man's belt. This made Jones realize what Hughes had envisioned. "The guy was 'Sign up for the Army quick before I kill you!'" Jones exclaimed.

Stein says he got the role of Bueller's economics teacher through six degrees of separation. "Richard Nixon introduced me to a man named Bill Safire, who's a New York Times columnist. He introduced me to a guy who's an executive at Warner Brothers. He introduced me to a guy who's a casting director. He introduced me to John Hughes. John Hughes and I are among the only Republicans in the picture business, and John Hughes put me in the movie," Stein said. Hughes said that Stein was an easy and early choice for the role of the teacher: "He wasn't a professional actor. He had a flat voice, he looked like a teacher."

=== Filming ===
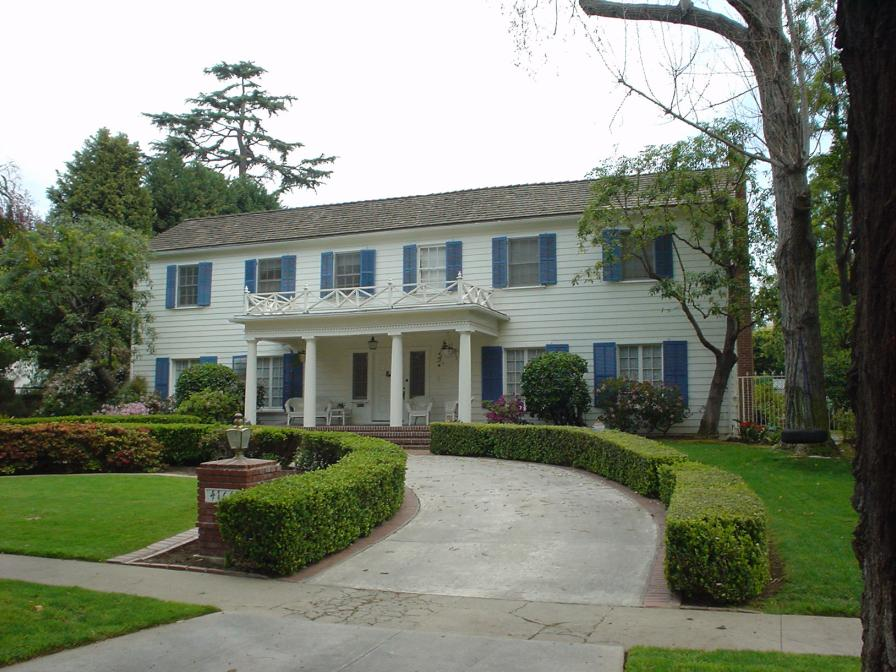
Northeast view of the house in Los Cerritos in Long Beach, California, used in the film

"Chicago is what I am," said Hughes. "A lot of Ferris is sort of my love letter to the city. And the more people who get upset with the fact that I film there, the more I'll make sure that's exactly where I film. It's funny—nobody ever says anything to Woody Allen about always filming in New York. America has this great reverence for New York. I look at it as this decaying horror pit. So let the people in Chicago enjoy Ferris Bueller."

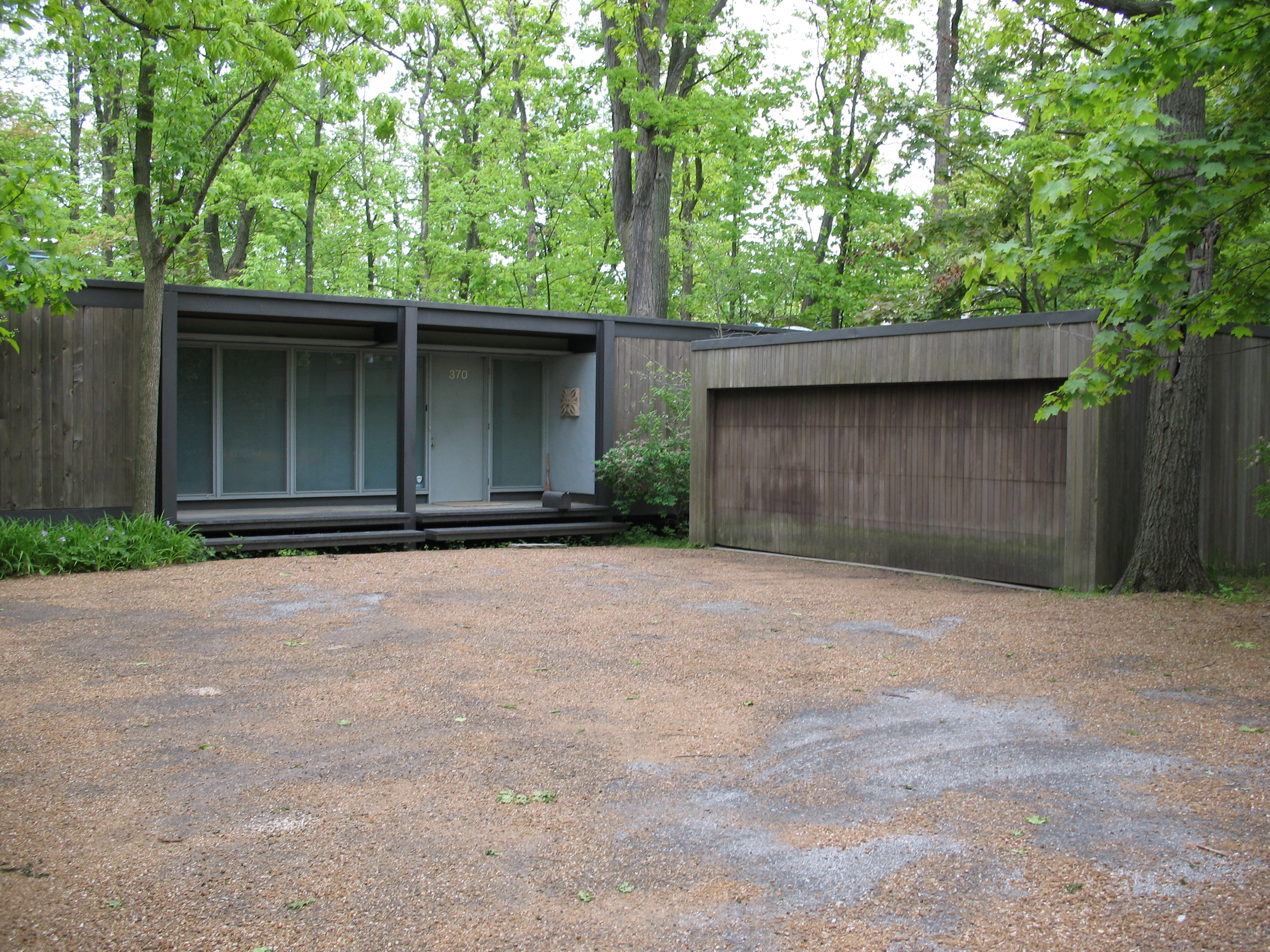
The Ben Rose House, in Highland Park, Illinois, served as the filming location for Cameron Frye's house.

For the film, Hughes got the chance to take a more expansive look at the city he grew up in. "We took a helicopter up the Chicago River. This is the first chance I'd really had to get outside while making a movie. Up to this point, the pictures had been pretty small. I really wanted to capture as much of Chicago as I could, not just the architecture and the landscape, but the spirit." Shooting began in Chicago on September 9, 1985. In late October 1985, the production moved to Los Angeles, and shooting ended on November 22. The Von Steuben Day Parade scene was filmed on September 28. Scenes were filmed at several locations in downtown Chicago and Winnetka (Ferris's home, his mother's real estate office, etc.). Many of the other scenes were filmed in Northbrook, Illinois, including at Glenbrook North High School. The exterior of Ferris's house is located at 4160 Country Club Drive, Long Beach, California, which, at the time of filming, was the childhood home of Judge Thad Balkman.

The modernist house of Cameron Frye is located in Highland Park, Illinois. Known as the Ben Rose House, the main building (1954) was designed by A. James Speyer, and the pavilion (1974) by David Haid. It was once owned by photographer Ben Rose, who had a car collection in the pavilion. In the film, Cameron's father is portrayed as owning a Ferrari 250 GT California in the same pavilion. According to Lake Forest College art professor Franz Shulze, during the filming of the scene where the Ferrari crashes out of the window, Haid explained to Hughes that he could prevent the car from damaging the rest of the pavilion. Haid fixed connections in the wall and the building remained intact. Haid said to Hughes afterward, "You owe me $25,000," and which Hughes paid. In the DVD commentary for the film, Hughes mentions that they had to remove every pane of glass from the house to film the car crash scene, since every pane was weakened by age and had acquired a similar tint, hence replacement panels would be obvious. Hughes added that they were able to use the house because producer Ned Tanen knew the owner because they were both Ferrari collectors.

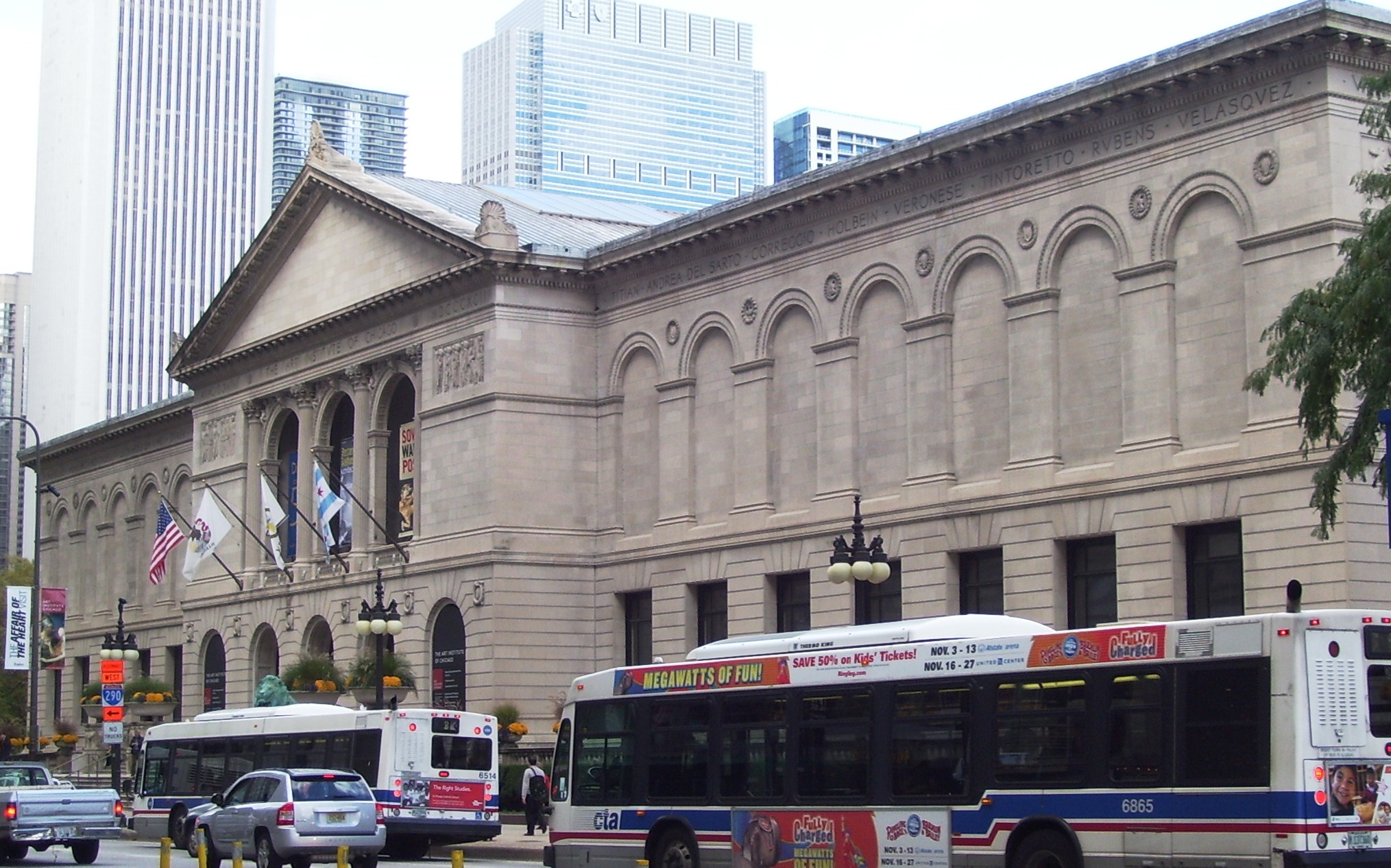
Hughes says The Art Institute of Chicago was a "place of refuge" in his youth.

According to Hughes, the scene at the Art Institute of Chicago was "a self-indulgent scene of mine—which was a place of refuge for me, I went there quite a bit, I loved it. I knew all the paintings, the building. This was a chance for me to go back into this building and show the paintings that were my favorite." The museum had not been shot in, until the producers of the film approached them. "I remember Hughes saying, 'There are going to be more works of art in this movie than there have ever been before,'" recalled Jennifer Grey. Among notable works featured in this scene include A Sunday Afternoon on the Island of La Grande Jatte (Georges Seurat, 1884), during which Cameron struggles to find his identity in the face of one of the children in the painting, and America Windows (Marc Chagall, 1977), in front of which Ferris and Sloane have a romantic moment.

A passionate Beatles fan, Hughes makes multiple references to them and John Lennon in the script. While filming, Hughes listened to their self-titled 1968 album every single day for 56 days. Hughes also pays tribute to his childhood hero Gordie Howe with Cameron's Detroit Red Wings jersey. "I sent them the jersey," said Howe. "It was nice seeing the No. 9 on the big screen." Ruck later explained the significance of Cameron wearing the Detroit Red Wings jersey. "John [Hughes] had spent some of his boyhood in Detroit...(and) had decided that Cameron had a horrible relationship with his father, but a great relationship with his grandfather, who lived in Detroit and would take Cameron to Red Wings games," Ruck said. "That's all it was, and it was never explained in the movie."

==== Ferrari ====
The 1961 Ferrari GT California in the film was actually a replica specially built by Modena Design & Development, as seen on display at The Henry Ford .

In the film, Ferris convinces Cameron to borrow his father's rare 1961 Ferrari 250 GT California Spyder. "The insert shots of the Ferrari were of the real 250 GT California," Hughes explains in the DVD commentary. "The cars we used in the wide shots were obviously reproductions. There were only 100 of these cars, so it was way too expensive to destroy. We had a number of replicas made. They were pretty good, but for the tight shots I needed a real one, so we brought one in to the stage and shot the inserts with it."

Prior to filming, Hughes learned about Modena Design and Development that produced the Modena Spyder California, a replica of the Ferrari 250 GT. Hughes saw a mention of the company in a car magazine and decided to research them. Neil Glassmoyer recalls the day Hughes contacted him to ask about seeing the Modena Spyder:

The first time he called I hung up on him because I thought it was a friend of mine who was given to practical jokes. Then he called back and convinced me it really was him, so Mark and I took the car to his office. While we were waiting outside to meet Hughes this scruffy-looking fellow came out of the building and began looking the car over; we thought from his appearance he must have been a janitor or something. Then he looked up at a window and shouted, 'This is it!' and several heads poked out to have a look. That scruffy-looking fellow was John Hughes, and the people in the window were his staff. Turned out it was between the Modena Spyder and a Porsche Turbo, and Hughes chose the Modena.

Automobile restorationist Mark Goyette designed the kits for three reproductions used in the film and chronicled the whereabouts of the cars today:

1. "Built by Goyette and leased to Paramount for the filming. It's the one that jumps over the camera, and is used in almost every shot. At the end of filming, Paramount returned it to Goyette, with the exhaust crushed and cracks in the body. "There was quite a bit of superficial damage, but it held up amazingly well," he said. He rebuilt it, and sold it to a young couple in California. The husband later ran it off the road, and Goyette rebuilt the front end for him. That owner sold it in the mid-90s, and it turned up again around 2000, but hasn't emerged since."
2. "Sold to Paramount as a kit for them to assemble as their stunt car, they did such a poor job that it was basically unusable, aside from going backwards out the window of Cameron's house. Rebuilt, it ended up at Planet Hollywood in Minneapolis and was moved to Planet Hollywood in Cancún when this one was closed." The car was later sold by Heritage Auctions on December 17, 2022, for $337,000 and is now in a private collection in Massachusetts.
3. "Another kit, supposed to be built as a shell for the out the window scene, it was never completed at all, and disappeared after the film was completed. Goyette thinks he once heard it was eventually completed and sold off, but it could also still be in a back lot at Paramount."

One of the "replicars" was sold by Bonhams on April 19, 2010, at the Royal Air Force Museum at Hendon, United Kingdom for £79,600 (equivalent to £122,960 in 2025) and is on display at the Henry Ford Museum in Dearborn, Michigan. Another "replicar" used in the movie, serial number 001, referenced as the "hero car" that Goyette stated "hasn't emerged since" was sold at the 2020 Scottsdale Barrett-Jackson Collector Car Auction on January 18, 2020, for US$396,000 (equivalent to $492,645 in 2025).

The "replicar" was "universally hated by the crew," said Ruck. "It didn't work right." The scene in which Ferris turns off the car to leave it with the garage attendant had to be shot a dozen times because it would not start. The car was built with a real wheel base, but used a Ford V8 engine instead of a V12.

At the time of filming, the original 250 GT California model was worth $350,000. Since the release of the film, it has become one of the most expensive cars ever sold, going at auction in 2008 for $10,976,000 (equivalent to $16,413,107 in 2025) and more recently in 2015 for $16,830,000 (equivalent to $22,859,785 in 2025).

The vanity plate of Cameron's dad's Ferrari spells NRVOUS and the other plates seen in the film are homages to Hughes's earlier works, VCTN (National Lampoon's Vacation), TBC (The Breakfast Club), MMOM (Mr. Mom), as well as 4FBDO (Ferris Bueller's Day Off).

==== Economics lecture ====
Ben Stein's famous monotonous lecture about the Smoot–Hawley Tariff Act was not originally in Hughes's script. Stein, by happenstance, was lecturing off-camera to the amusement of the student cast. "I was just going to do it off camera, but the student extras laughed so hard when they heard my voice that (Hughes) said do it on camera, improvise, something you know a lot about. When I gave the lecture about supply-side economics, I thought they were applauding. Everybody on the set applauded. I thought they were applauding because they had learned something about supply-side economics. But they were applauding because they thought I was boring. ... It was the best day of my life," Stein said.

==== Parade scene ====
The parade scene took multiple days of filming; Broderick spent some time practicing the dance moves. "I was very scared," Broderick said. "Fortunately, the sequence was carefully choreographed beforehand. We worked out all the moves by rehearsing in a little studio. It was shot on two Saturdays in the heart of downtown Chicago. The first day was during a real parade, and John got some very long shots. Then radio stations carried announcements inviting people to take part in 'a John Hughes movie'. The word got around fast and 10,000 people showed up! For the final shot, I turned around and saw a river of people. I put my hands up at the end of the number and heard this huge roar. I can understand how rock stars feel. That kind of reaction feeds you."

Broderick's moves were choreographed by Kenny Ortega (who later choreographed Dirty Dancing). Much of it had to be scrapped, though, for Broderick had injured his knee badly during the scenes of running through neighbors' backyards. "I was pretty sore", Broderick said. "I got well enough to do what you see in the parade there, but I couldn't do most of Kenny Ortega's knee spins and things like that that we had worked on. When we did shoot it, we had all this choreography and I remember John would yell with a megaphone, 'Okay, do it again, but don't do any of the choreography', because he wanted it to be a total mess." "Danke Schoen" was somewhat choreographed but for "Twist and Shout", Broderick said, "we were just making everything up." Hughes explained that much of the scene was spontaneously filmed. "It just happened that this was an actual parade, which we put our float into—unbeknownst to anybody, all the people on the reviewing stand. Nobody knew what it was, including the governor."

==== Wrigley Field ====
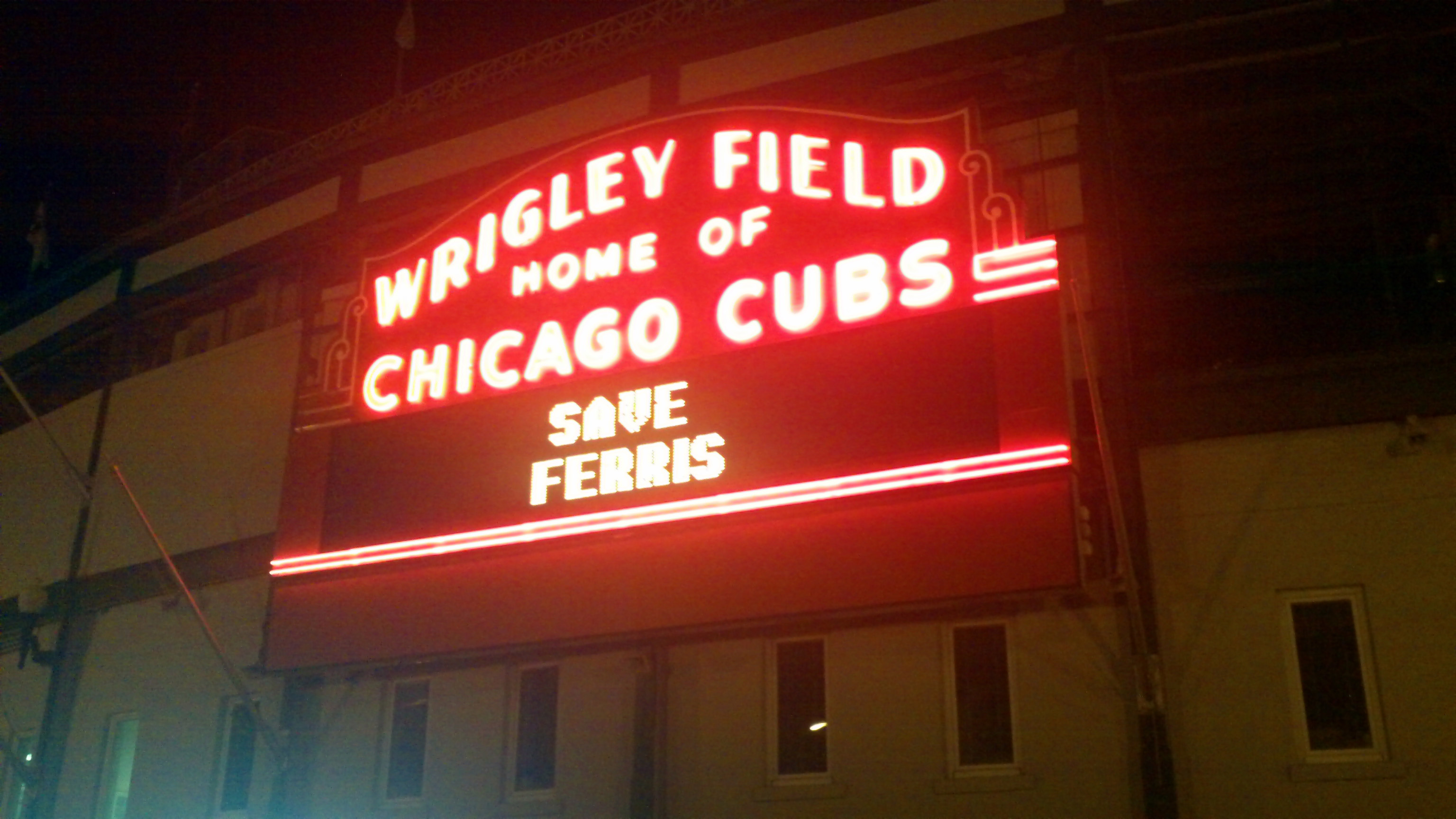
Ferris Bueller Night at Wrigley Field, October 1, 2011

Wrigley Field is featured in two interwoven and consecutive scenes. In the first scene, Rooney is looking for Ferris at a pizza joint while Harry Caray's voice announces the action of a ballgame that is being shown on TV. From the play-by-play descriptions, the uniforms, and the player numbers, this game has been identified as the June 5, 1985, game between the Atlanta Braves and the Chicago Cubs.

In the next scene, Sloane, Cameron, and Ferris are in the left field stands inside Wrigley. Ferris flexes his hand in pain after supposedly catching the foul ball. During this scene, the characters enjoy the game and joke about what they would be doing if they had played by the rules. All these "in the park" shots, including the one from the previous scene where Ferris catches the foul ball on TV, were filmed on September 24, 1985, at a game between the Montreal Expos and the Cubs. During the 1985 season, the Braves and the Expos both wore powder blue uniforms during their road games so, with seamless editing by Hirsch, it is difficult to distinguish that the game being seen and described in the pizza joint is not only a different game but also a different Cubs' opponent from the one filmed inside the stadium. On October 1, 2011, Wrigley Field celebrated the 25th anniversary of the film by showing it on three giant screens on the infield.

== Post-production ==
=== Editing ===
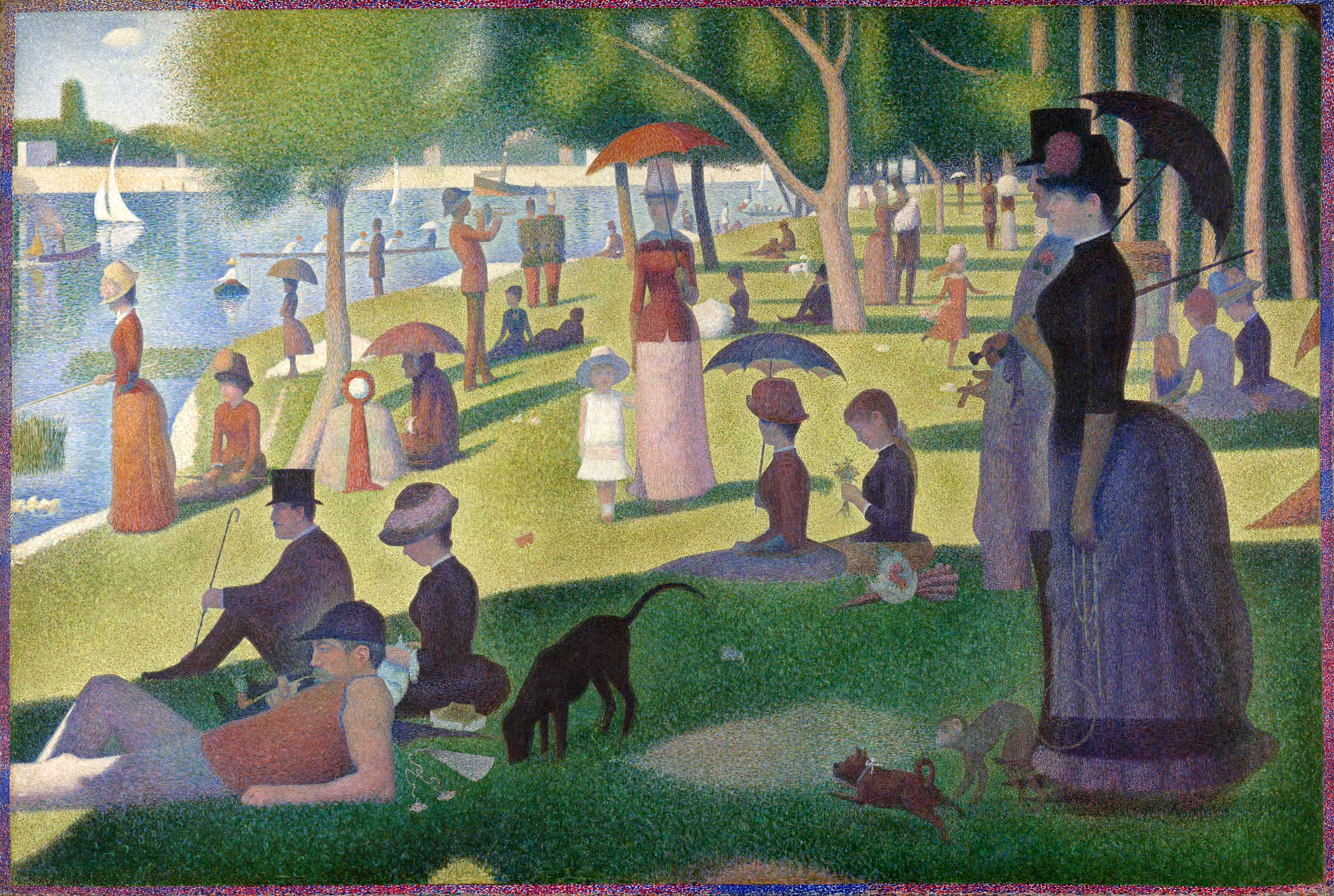
Cameron is transfixed by Georges Seurat's A Sunday Afternoon on the Island of La Grande Jatte.

According to editor Paul Hirsch, in the original cut, the museum scene fared poorly at test screenings until he switched sequences around and Hughes changed the soundtrack.

The piece of music I originally chose was a classical guitar solo played on acoustic guitar. It was nonmetrical with a lot of rubato. I cut the sequence to that music and it also became nonmetrical and irregular. I thought it was great and so did Hughes. He loved it so much that he showed it to the studio but they just went "Ehhh." Then after many screenings where the audience said, "The museum scene is the scene we like least," he decided to replace the music. We had all loved it, but the audience hated it. I said, "I think I know why they hate the museum scene. It's in the wrong place." Originally, the parade sequence came before the museum sequence, but I realized that the parade was the highlight of the day, there was no way we could top it, so it had to be the last thing before the three kids go home. So that was agreed upon, we reshuffled the events of the day, and moved the museum sequence before the parade. Then we screened it and everybody loved the museum scene! My feeling was that they loved it because it came in at the right point in the sequence of events. John felt they loved it because of the music. Basically, the bottom line is, it worked.

The music used for the final version of the museum sequence is an instrumental cover version of The Smiths' "Please Please Please Let Me Get What I Want", performed by The Dream Academy.

=== Deleted scenes ===
Several scenes were cut from the final film; one lost scene titled "The Isles of Langerhans" has the three teenagers trying to order in the French restaurant, shocked to discover pancreas on the menu (although in the finished film, Ferris still says, "We ate pancreas", while recapping the day). This is featured on the Bueller, Bueller Edition DVD. Other scenes were never made available on any DVD version. These scenes included additional screen time with Jeanie in a locker room, Ferris's younger brother and sister (both of whom were completely removed from the film), and additional lines of dialogue throughout the film, all of which can be seen in the original theatrical trailer. Hughes had also wanted to film a scene where Ferris, Sloane, and Cameron go to a strip club. Paramount executives told him there were only so many shooting days left, so the scene was scrapped.

According to former vice president of production for Paramount Pictures Lindsay Doran, an earlier version of the film included a line by Sloane to Cameron during the parade scene when they are discussing their future that resulted in very low scores from young female viewers during test screenings. In the scene, Sloane said, "A girl can always bail out and have a baby and get some guy to support her." "Girls hated that line," Doran recalls. "It was meant as an ironic criticism of gender politics," explained producer Tom Jacobson. "But it went over the heads of the audience and they thought maybe she was espousing them." After cutting the line, Doran said young female test scores skyrocketed approximately 40 points, which was the most dramatic test screening improvement through cutting a single line that she had ever seen.

The script also included more dialogue that would have explained Charlie Sheen's character and provided more context to his scene. Though Sheen's character was not named in the film, the script identified him as Garth Volbeck, a friend of Ferris from middle school with a difficult home life. Early in the script, Ferris spoke about how he tried to help Garth turn his life around, but was ultimately unsuccessful as Garth threw his life away due to his substance abuse. This ultimately led to Sheen's appearance in the police station, where he reveals that he is Garth. The scene provided extra context to Ferris's motivation as to why he wanted to show Cameron a memorable day – Garth represented Cameron's future if Ferris did not get involved. The backstory would have also given additional context as to why Garth was so complimentary towards Ferris in the scene with Jeanie – he still felt loyalty to Ferris from his time when they were friends.

== Music ==
=== Limited edition fan club soundtrack ===
An official soundtrack was not originally released for the film, since director John Hughes felt the songs would not work well together as a continuous album. However, according to an interview with Lollipop magazine, Hughes noted that he had sent 100,000 7" vinyl singles containing two songs featured in the film to members of his fan mailing list. Hughes gave further details about his refusal to release a soundtrack in the Lollipop interview:

The only official soundtrack that Ferris Bueller's Day Off ever had was for the mailing list. A&M was very angry with me over that; they begged me to put one out, but I thought "who'd want all of these songs?" I mean, would kids want "Danke Schoen" and "Oh Yeah" on the same record? They probably already had "Twist and Shout", or their parents did, and to put all of those together with the more contemporary stuff, like the (English) Beat—I just didn't think anybody would like it. But I did put together a seven-inch of the two songs I owned the rights to—"Beat City" on one side, and... I forget, one of the other English bands on the soundtrack... and sent that to the mailing list. By '86, '87, it was costing us $30 a piece to mail out 100,000 packages. But it was a labor of love.

=== Featured songs ===
Songs feature prominently in the film, often creating "de facto music videos". Tracks included are:

- "Love Missile F1-11" (extended version) by Sigue Sigue Sputnik
- "Jeannie" (theme from I Dream of Jeannie)
- "Beat City" by The Flowerpot Men
- "Main Title / Rebel Blockade Runner" by John Williams (from Star Wars)
- "Please Please Please Let Me Get What I Want" (instrumental) by The Dream Academy (a cover version of a song by The Smiths)
- "The Celebrated Minuet" by Luigi Boccherini (performed by the Zagreb Philharmonic Chamber Studio)
- "Danke Schoen" by Wayne Newton
- "Twist and Shout" by The Beatles
- "Radio People" by Zapp
- "I'm Afraid" by Blue Room
- "Taking the Day Off" by General Public
- "The Edge of Forever" by The Dream Academy
- "March of the Swivelheads" (a remix of "Rotating Heads") by The Beat
- "Oh Yeah" by Yello
- "BAD" by Big Audio Dynamite

"Danke Schoen" is one of the recurring motifs in the film and is sung by Ferris, Ed Rooney, and Jeanie. Hughes called it the "most awful song of my youth. Every time it came on, I just wanted to scream, claw my face. I was taking German in high school—which meant that we listened to it in school. I couldn't get away from it." According to Broderick, Ferris's singing "Danke Schoen" in the shower was his idea. "Although it's only because of the brilliance of John's deciding that I should sing "Danke Schoen" on the float in the parade. I had never heard the song before. I was learning it for the parade scene. So we're doing the shower scene and I thought, 'Well, I can do a little rehearsal.' And I did something with my hair to make that Mohawk. And you know what good directors do: they say; 'Stop! Wait until we roll.' And John put that stuff in."

Wayne Newton told the Chicago Sun-Times he was thrilled to have his song featured in the film. "It was really cool because I thought, okay, 'Danke Schoen' had run its gamut. When I saw [Broderick] doing an impression, lip syncing to my version of the song, I thought that was the coolest thing I had ever seen." Ferris Bueller's Day Off propelled the Beatles' 1963 recording of "Twist and Shout" back onto the Billboard Hot 100 chart, where it peaked at No. 23 on September 27, 1986, 22 years after its original issue in the US.

=== 2016 soundtrack ===
Ferris Bueller's Day Off

Soundtrack album by various artists
- Released: September 13, 2016
- Genre: New wave
- Length: 76:47
- Label: La-La Land Records

The soundtrack for the film, limited to 5,000 copies, was released on September 13, 2016, by La-La Land Records. The album includes new wave and pop songs featured in the film, as well as Ira Newborn's complete score, including unused cues. Due to licensing restrictions, "Twist and Shout," "Taking The Day Off," and "March of the Swivelheads" were not included, but are available elsewhere. The Flowerpot Men's "Beat City" makes its first official release on CD with a new mix done by The Flowerpot Men's Ben Watkins and Adam Peters that differs from the original 7" fan club release.

== Reception ==
=== Critical response ===
The film largely received positive reviews from critics. Roger Ebert gave it three out of four stars, calling it "one of the most innocent movies in a long time," and "a sweet, warm-hearted comedy." Richard Roeper called the film:

.. one of my favorite movies of all time. It has one of the highest 'repeatability' factors of any film I've ever seen... I can watch it again and again. There's also this, and I say it in all sincerity: Ferris Bueller's Day Off is something of a suicide prevention film, or at the very least a story about a young man trying to help his friend gain some measure of self-worth... Ferris has made it his mission to show Cameron that the whole world in front of him is passing him by, and that life can be pretty sweet if you wake up and embrace it. That's the lasting message of Ferris Bueller's Day Off.

Roeper pays homage to the film with a license plate that reads "SVFRRIS". Essayist Steve Almond called Ferris "the most sophisticated teen movie [he] had ever seen," adding that while Hughes had made a lot of good movies, Ferris was the "one film [he] would consider true art, [the] only one that reaches toward the ecstatic power of teendom and, at the same time, exposes the true, piercing woe of that age." Almond also applauded Ruck's performance, going so far as saying he deserved the Academy Award for Best Supporting Actor of 1986: "His performance is what elevates the film, allows it to assume the power of a modern parable." The New York Times reviewer Nina Darnton criticized Mia Sara's portrayal of Sloane for lacking "the specific detail that characterized the adolescent characters in Hughes's other films," asserting she "created a basically stable but forgettable character." Conversely, Darnton praised Ruck and Grey's performances:

The two people who grow in the movie—Cameron, played with humor and sensitivity by Alan Ruck, and Ferris's sister Jeanie, played with appropriate self-pity by Jennifer Grey—are the most authentic. Grey manages to play an insufferably sulky teen-ager who is still attractive and likable.

Co-star Ben Stein was exceptionally moved by the film, calling it "the most life-affirming movie possibly of the entire post-war period." "This is to comedies what Gone with the Wind is to epics," Stein added.

It will never die, because it responds to and calls forth such human emotions. It isn't dirty. There's nothing mean-spirited about it. There's nothing sneering or sniggering about it. It's just wholesome. We want to be free. We want to have a good time. We know we're not going to be able to all our lives. We know we're going to have to buckle down and work. We know we're going to have to eventually become family men and women, and have responsibilities and pay our bills. But just give us a couple of good days that we can look back on.

National Review writer Mark Hemingway lauded the film's celebration of liberty.

If there's a better celluloid expression of ordinary American freedom than Ferris Bueller's Day Off, I have yet to see it. If you could take one day and do absolutely anything, piling into a convertible with your best girl and your best friend and taking in a baseball game, an art museum, and a fine meal seems about as good as it gets.

Others were less enamored of Ferris, many taking issue with the film's "rebel without a cause" hedonism. David Denby of New York Magazine, called the film "a nauseating distillation of the slack, greedy side of Reaganism." Author Christina Lee agreed, adding it was a "splendidly ridiculous exercise in unadulterated indulgence," and the film "encapsulated the Reagan era's near solipsist worldview and insatiable appetite for immediate gratification—of living in and for the moment..." Gene Siskel panned the film from a Chicago-centric perspective, saying: "Ferris Bueller doesn't do anything much fun ... [t]hey don't even sit in the bleachers where all the kids like to sit when they go to Cubs games." Siskel did enjoy the chemistry between Jennifer Grey and Charlie Sheen. Ebert thought Siskel was too eager to find flaws in the film's view of Chicago.

On Rotten Tomatoes, the film has an approval rating of 85% based on 149 critics' reviews. The website's critical consensus reads: "Matthew Broderick charms in Ferris Bueller's Day Off, a light and irrepressibly fun movie about being young and having fun." Metacritic gave the film a score of 61 based on 13 reviews, indicating "generally favorable reviews". Audiences polled by CinemaScore gave the film an average grade of "A−" on an A+ to F scale.

=== Accolades ===
Broderick was nominated for a Golden Globe Award in 1987 for Best Actor – Motion Picture Musical or Comedy.

=== Box office ===
The film opened in 1,330 theaters in the United States, and had a total weekend gross of $6,275,647. Opening at No. 2., Ferris Bueller's Day Off's total gross in the United States was approximately $70,136,369, making it a box office success. It subsequently became the 10th-highest-grossing film of 1986.

=== Rankings ===
As an influential and popular film, Ferris Bueller's Day Off has been included in many film rating lists. The film is number 54 on Bravo's "100 Funniest Movies", came 26th in the British 50 Greatest Comedy Films and ranked number 10 on Entertainment Weekly's list of the "50 Best High School Movies".

== Cultural influence ==
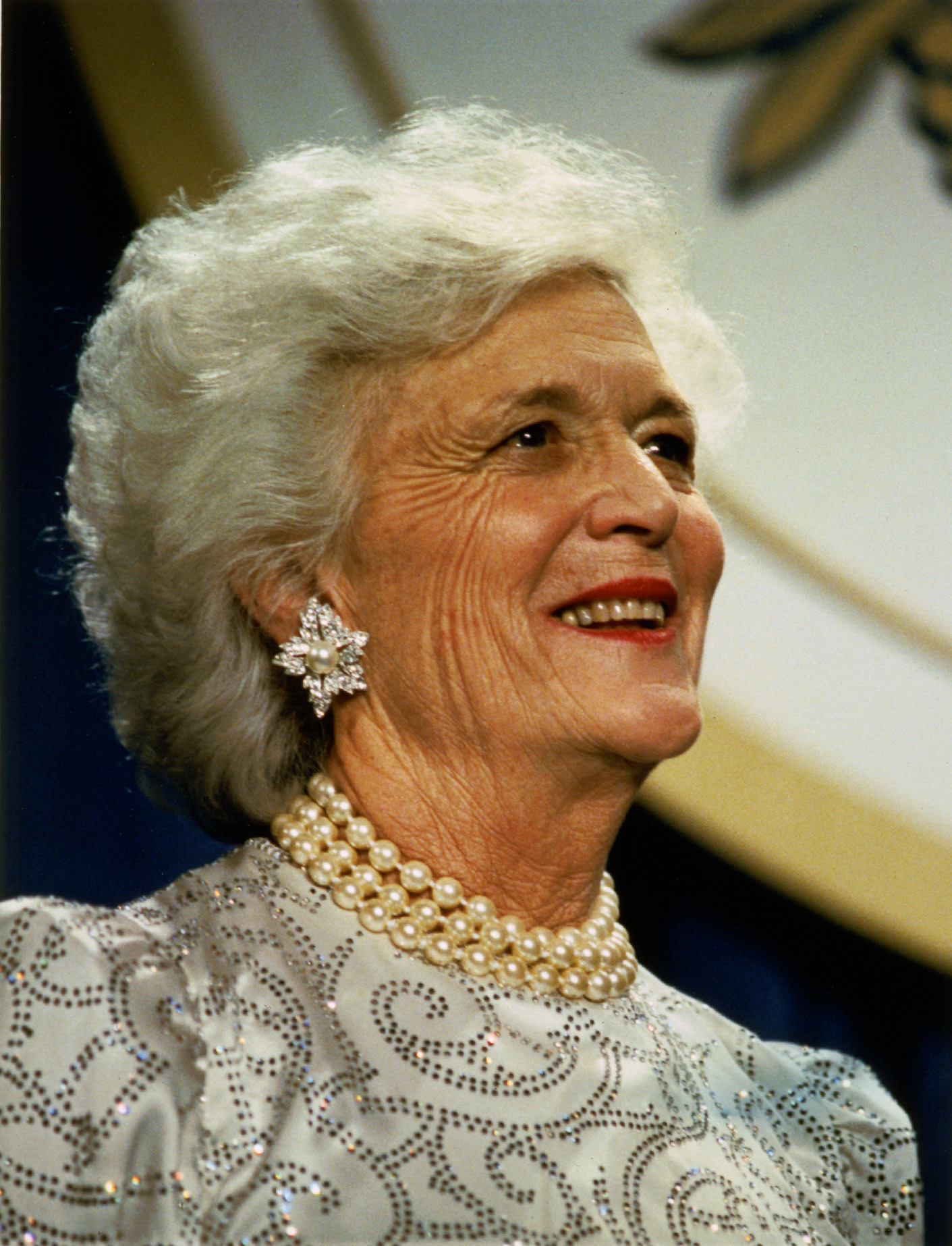
Barbara Bush used dialogue from the film at a commencement speech.

John Hughes said of Bueller, "That kid will either become President of the United States or go to prison." U.S. President Ronald Reagan viewed the film at Camp David on June 21, 1986. First Lady Barbara Bush paraphrased the film in her 1990 commencement address at Wellesley College: "Find the joy in life, because as Ferris Bueller said on his day off, 'Life moves pretty fast; if you don't stop and look around once in a while, you could miss it!'" Responding to the audience's enthusiastic applause, she added "I'm not going to tell George you clapped more for Ferris than you clapped for George."

Other phrases from Ferris Bueller's Day Off such as Stein's monotone-voiced "Bueller? ...Bueller? ...Bueller?" (while taking roll call in class), and "Anyone? Anyone?" (trying to probe the students for answers) as well as Kristy Swanson's cheerful "No problem whatsoever!" also permeated popular culture. In fact, Stein's monotone performance launched his acting career. In 2016, Stein reprised the attendance scene in a campaign ad for Iowa Senator Chuck Grassley; Stein intoned the last name of Grassley's opponent (Patty Judge), to silence, while facts about her missed votes and absences from state board meetings were listed. Stein then calls out "Grassley," which gets a response; Stein mutters, "He's always here."

Broderick said of the Bueller role, "It eclipsed everything, I should admit, and to some degree it still does." Later at the 2010 Oscar tribute to Hughes, he said, "For the past 25 years, nearly every day someone comes up to me, taps me on the shoulder and says, 'Hey, Ferris, is this your day off?'" In a 2023 interview, Broderick stated that the 1990s "were hard" after starring in the film. Matthew Broderick reprises his role of Bueller in the end credits for She's Having a Baby. He is among the people that pitch the names of Jake and Kristy's baby son. Alan Ruck reprises his role of Cameron Frye in Kickin' It Old Skool.

Ruck says that with Cameron Frye, Hughes gave him "the best part I ever had in a movie, and any success that I've had since 1985 is because he took a big chance on me. I'll be forever grateful." "While we were making the movie, I just knew I had a really good part", Ruck says. "My realization of John's impact on the teen-comedy genre crept in sometime later. Teen comedies tend to dwell on the ridiculous, as a rule. It's always the preoccupation with sex and the self-involvement, and we kind of hold the kids up for ridicule in a way. Hughes added this element of dignity. He was an advocate for teenagers as complete human beings, and he honored their hopes and their dreams. That's what you see in his movies."

Broderick starred in a television advertisement prepared by Honda promoting its CR-V for the 2012 Super Bowl XLVI. The ad pays homage to Ferris Bueller, featuring Broderick (as himself) faking illness to skip out of work to enjoy sightseeing around Los Angeles. Several elements, such as the use of the song "Oh Yeah", and a valet monotonously calling for "Broderick... Broderick...", appear in the ad. A teaser for the ad had appeared two weeks prior to the Super Bowl, which had created rumors of a possible film sequel. It was produced by Santa Monica-based RPA and directed by Todd Phillips. Adweek's Tim Nudd called the ad "a great homage to the original 1986 film, with Broderick this time calling in sick to a film shoot and enjoying another day of slacking." On the other hand, Jalopnik's Matt Hardigree called the spot "sacrilegious".

The film has been parodied in television series, with characters taking a day off from their normal routine to have a day of adventure. Examples include the episodes "Barry's Day Off" from The Goldbergs, "Brian Finch's Black Op" from Limitless, and "Turner's and Brenda's Day Off" from South Side. In March 2017, Domino's Pizza began an advertising campaign parodying the film, featuring actor Joe Keery in the lead role. Early in 2020, internet personality Zach King released a short film parody on his YouTube channel. In September 2020, LiftMaster released a commercial where two young boys attempt to drive a 1966 Jaguar E-Type owned by the father of one of the boys. The commercial, advertising the Liftmaster Secure View, a security system built into the device, features Alan Ruck as an older Cameron Frye, who warns the boys after catching them on camera. He then speaks to the audience "Been there, done that."

=== Music ===
The film's influence in popular culture extends beyond the film itself to how musical elements of the film have been received as well, for example, Yello's song "Oh Yeah". As Jonathan Bernstein explains, "Never a hit, this slice of Swiss-made tomfoolery with its varispeed vocal effects and driving percussion was first used by John Hughes to illustrate the mouthwatering must-haveness of Cameron's dad's Ferrari. Since then, it has become synonymous with avarice. Every time a movie, TV show or commercial wants to underline the jaw-dropping impact of a hot babe or sleek auto, that synth-drum starts popping and that deep voice rumbles, 'Oh yeah . . .'" Yello was unheard of in the United States at the time, but the inclusion of their song in Ferris Bueller and The Secret of My Success the following year sparked great interest in the song, where it reached the Billboard Hot 100 and US Dance charts in 1987. It often became referred to as "the Ferris Bueller song" due to its attachment with the movie. Dieter Meier of Yello was able to use the licensing fees from "Oh Yeah"'s appearance in Ferris Bueller and other films to start a series of investments and amassed a large fortune.

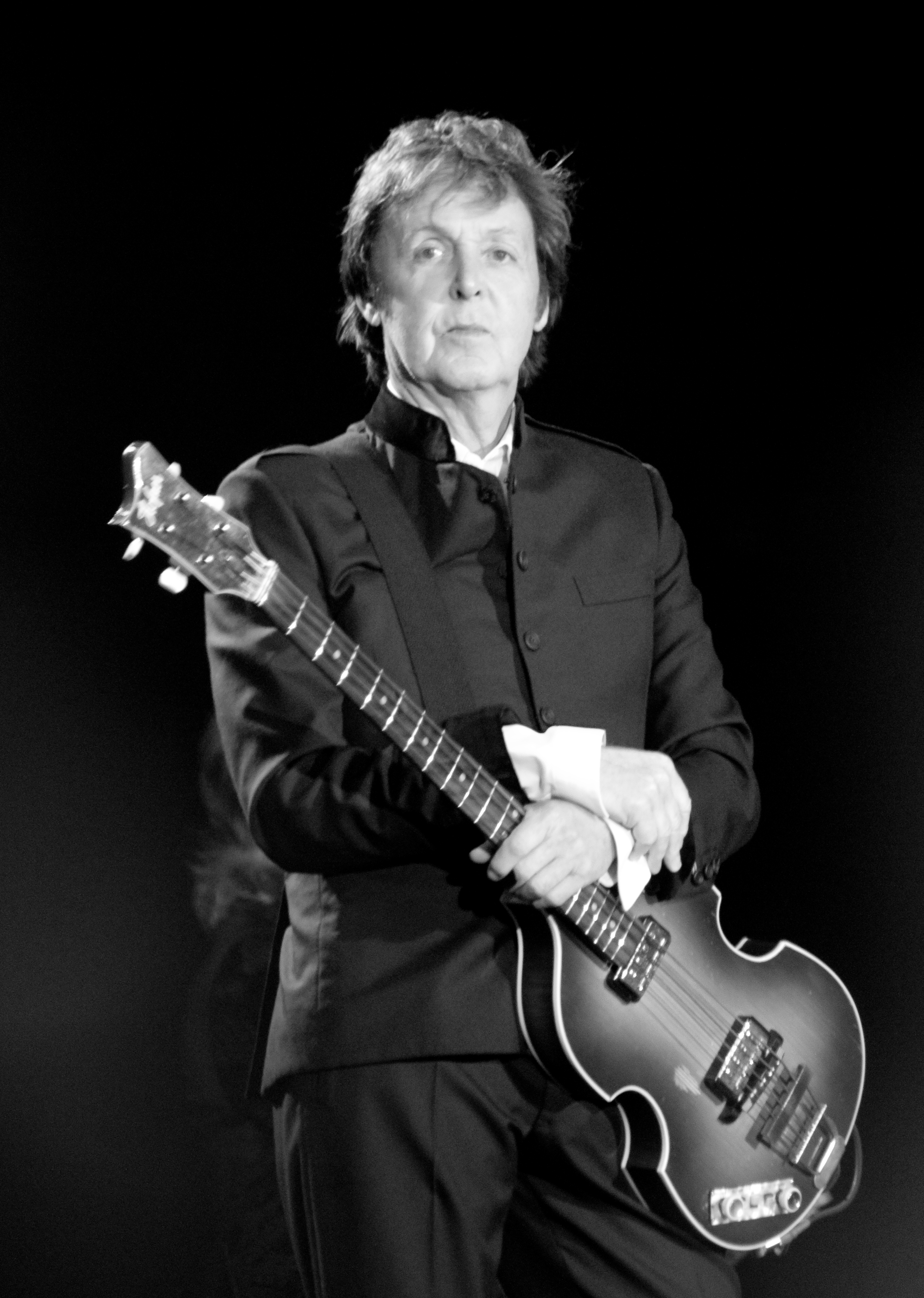
While Paul McCartney admitted that he liked the movie, he personally disliked the "Twist and Shout" sequence for its inclusion of brass instruments.

Concerning the influence of another song used in the film, Roz Kaveney writes that some "of the finest moments in later teen film draw on Ferris's blithe Dionysian fervour — the elaborate courtship by song in 10 Things I Hate About You (1999) draws usefully on the "Twist and Shout" sequence in Ferris Bueller's Day Off. "Twist and Shout" charted again, 16 years after the Beatles broke up, as a result of its prominent appearance in both this film and Back to School (where Rodney Dangerfield performs a cover version) which was released the same weekend as Ferris Bueller's Day Off. The re-released single reached No. 23 in the U.S; a US-only compilation album containing the track The Early Beatles, re-entered the album charts at No. 197. The version heard in the film includes brass overdubbed onto the Beatles' original recording, which did not go down well with Paul McCartney. "I liked [the] film but they overdubbed some lousy brass on the stuff! If it had needed brass, we'd had stuck it on ourselves!" Upon hearing McCartney's reaction, Hughes felt bad for "offend[ing] a Beatle. But it wasn't really part of the song. We saw a band [onscreen] and we needed to hear the instruments." The bands Save Ferris and Rooney were named in allusion to Ferris Bueller's Day Off.

== Academic analysis ==
Many scholars have discussed at length the film's depiction of academia and youth culture. For Martin Morse Wooster, the film "portrayed teachers as humorless buffoons whose only function was to prevent teenagers from having a good time." Regarding not specifically teachers, but rather a type of adult characterization in general, Art Silverblatt asserts that the "adults in Ferris Bueller's Day Off are irrelevant and impotent. Ferris's nemesis, the school disciplinarian, Mr. Rooney, is obsessed with 'getting Bueller.' His obsession emerges from envy. Strangely, Ferris serves as Rooney's role model, as he clearly possesses the imagination and power that Rooney lacks. ... By capturing and disempowering Ferris, Rooney hopes to ... reduce Ferris's influence over other students, which would reestablish adults, that is, Rooney, as traditional authority figures."

Nevertheless, Silverblatt concludes that "Rooney is essentially a comedic figure, whose bumbling attempts to discipline Ferris are a primary source of humor in the film." Thomas Patrick Doherty writes that "the adult villains in teenpics such as ... Ferris Bueller's Day Off (1986) are overdrawn caricatures, no real threat; they're played for laughs." Yet Silverblatt also remarks that casting "the principal as a comic figure questions the competence of adults to provide young people with effective direction—indeed, the value of adulthood itself."

Attempting to categorise the portrayal of school principals in movies and television, another author observed that they are consistently depicted being either an "authoritarian", "bureaucrat", or "numskull". It was noted that Rooney adheres to the last of these stereotypes, which relies on "caricature and exaggeration" to imply that "principals are dimwitted dolts who haven't the foggiest notion of what is transpiring in the[ir] school". Almost exclusively men, they are "easily taken in by outlandish schemes conceived by presumably far brighter and more creative students".

Adults are not the stars or main characters of the film, and Roz Kaveney notes that what "Ferris Bueller brings to the teen genre, ultimately, is a sense of how it is possible to be cool and popular without being rich or a sports hero. Unlike the heroes of Weird Science, Ferris is computer savvy without being a nerd or a geek—it is a skill he has taken the trouble to learn." In 2010, English comedian Dan Willis performed his show "Ferris Bueller's Way Of..." at the Edinburgh Festival, delving into the philosophy of the movie and looking for life answers within.

== Home media and other releases ==
The film was released on VHS on April 8, 1987, by Paramount Home Video. It has been released on DVD three times; including on October 19, 1999, on January 10, 2006, as the Bueller... Bueller edition, and the I Love the '80s edition August 19, 2008. The original DVD, like most Paramount Pictures films released on DVD for the first time, has very few bonus features, but it does feature a commentary by Hughes. Though this is no longer available for sale, the director's commentary is available.

The Bueller... Bueller DVD re-release has several more bonus features, but does not contain the commentary track of the original DVD release. The edition was released in the United States on January 10, 2006, Sweden on April 12, 2006, Spain on April 18, 2006, and the United Kingdom on May 29, 2006. The I Love the '80s edition is identical to the first DVD release (no features aside from commentary), but includes a bonus CD with songs from the 1980s. The songs are not featured in the film. The Bueller... Bueller edition has multiple bonus features such as interviews with the cast and crew, along with a clip of Stein's commentaries on the film's philosophy and impact.

The film was released in 4K to the Ultra HD Blu-ray format on August 1, 2023. This disc includes John Hughes' commentary track that was first found on the 1999 DVD release.

== Follow-ups ==
Broderick and Hughes stayed in touch for a while after production. "We thought about a sequel to Ferris Bueller, where he'd be in college or at his first job, and the same kind of things would happen again," said Broderick in a 2010 interview. "But neither of us found a very exciting hook to that. The movie is about a singular time in your life." "Ferris Bueller is about the week before you leave school, it's about the end of school—in some way, it doesn't have a sequel. It's a little moment. It's a lightning flash in your life. I mean, you could try to repeat it in college or something but it's a time that you don't keep. So that's partly why I think we couldn't think of another," Broderick added.

"But just for fun," said Ruck, "I used to think why don't they wait until Matthew and I are in our seventies and do Ferris Bueller Returns and have Cameron be in a nursing home. He doesn't really need to be there, but he just decided his life is over, so he committed himself to a nursing home. And Ferris comes and breaks him out. And they go to, like, a titty bar and all this ridiculous stuff happens. And then, at the end of the movie, Cameron dies."

=== Cancelled spin-off ===
In August 2022, a spin-off film entitled Sam & Victor's Day Off was announced to be in development for the streaming service Paramount+. Taking place during the events of Ferris Bueller's Day Off and focusing on the two titular valets who took Cameron's father's 1961 Ferrari 250 GT California Spyder on a joy ride (originally portrayed in the film by Richard Edson and Larry "Flash" Jenkins), the film would be produced by Jon Hurwitz, Hayden Schlossberg, and Josh Heald, and written by Bill Posley. David Katzenberg was also attached to direct the film. However, following the merger of Skydance Media and Paramount Global, the project was scrapped in December 2025.

=== Television series ===
In 1990, a television series titled Ferris Bueller started airing on NBC. It starred Charlie Schlatter as Ferris Bueller and Jennifer Aniston as Jeannie Bueller. Jennifer Aniston and Jennifer Grey would subsequently appear together in one episode of the sitcom Friends, their characters (Rachel and Mindy) being the former and current fiancée of Barry Farber. Mindy returns in one further episode but was played by another actress.

=== Lewis Hamilton ===
In March 2025, seven time Formula One Driver's Champion Lewis Hamilton released a short film, which featured Edward Norton and Hamilton himself being the role of garage attendants while the leading characters placed the Ferrari car to the garage, then spinning out the car themselves. With the help of Paramount Pictures, Dawn Apollo Films (film production company founded by Hamilton himself) used current technologies to fit both new characters into the actual film footage. Hamilton used this short film to salute his favorite film as a child, and commemorate his first racing season with Ferrari in 2025.

== See also ==
- List of cult films
