= A. James Speyer =

American art curator, architect, and academic

Abraham James Speyer
- Born: December 27, 1913; Pittsburgh, Pennsylvania, United States
- Died: November 9, 1986 (aged 72); Chicago, Illinois, United States
- Education: Carnegie Institute of Technology; Chelsea Polytechnic; Sorbonne University; Armour Institute of Technology
- Occupations: Architect, academic, art curator
- Notable work: Ben Rose House

Abraham James Speyer (December 27, 1913– November 9, 1986) was an American art curator and architect, who was considered one of the leading experts on American and European contemporary art in the United States. As an architect he is remembered for his modernist house designs. The best known of these is the Ben Rose House in Highland Park, Illinois, which featured in the 1986 film Ferris Bueller's Day Off. He also taught architecture at the Illinois Institute of Technology and the University of Athens.

== Life and career ==
Speyer was born in Pittsburgh on December 27, 1913, the fist child of Tillie (née Sunstein) and Alexander Crail Speyer, a private investor. He was educated at home until about the age of 12. He graduated with a bachelor's degree in architecture from the Carnegie Institute of Technology in 1934. Attracted to the International Style, during the next three years he studied at Chelsea Polytechnic in London and the Sorbonne University in Paris. In 1939, he obtained a master's degree from the Armour Institute of Technology as the first graduate student of Mies van der Rohe, whom he was so eager to study under that in the fall of the previous year he tracked down the newly-arrived émigré from Nazi Germany at the Stevens Hotel in Chicago.

In 1941, Speyer was drafted into the United States Army. In the South Pacific, he was in charge of a chemical warfare intelligence unit, which later became part of the Monuments, Fine Arts, and Archives program (the so-called "Monuments Men"). He was promoted to the rank of major in April 1945.

After returning to Chicago in 1946, Speyer embarked on an architectural career, which was focussed mainly on residential projects. He was offered teaching work at the Illinois (formerly, Armour) Institute of Technology later that year, and for the next decade combined this with his architectal work. He was made an associate professor in 1952. In 1957, through the Fulbright Program, he moved to the University of Athens in Greece.

Having been a regular correspondent for Artnews since 1955, in 1961 he accepted an appointment as Curator of Contemporary Art at the Art Institute of Chicago. In 1984, he was elected a trustee of the Hirshhorn Museum and Sculpture Garden in Washington, D.C..

Speyer died on November 9, 1986 at the Bernard A. Mitchell Hospital in Chicago. During the preceding nine years he had undergone numerous rounds of chemotherapy to combat lymphoma.
