= Oh Yeah (Yello song) =

1985 single by Yello

- Cover art for 1987 European release

Single by Yello

from the album Stella
- B-side: "La Habanera"; "Oh Yeah (Indian Summer Version)"
- Released: 12 July 1985 (US); 28 September 1987 (Europe)
- Studio: Yello Studio (Zurich, Switzerland)
- Genre: New wave; electronic
- Length: 3:08
- Label: Mercury
- Songwriters: Boris Blank; Dieter Meier
- Producer: Yello

Yello singles chronology
"Desire" (1985)	"Oh Yeah" (1985)	"Goldrush" (1986)

Music video
- "Oh Yeah (1987 version)" on YouTube

"Oh Yeah" is a single released in 1985 by the band Yello and featured on their album Stella. The song features a mix of electronic music and manipulated vocals. "Oh Yeah" became a staple in pop culture after being featured in the films Ferris Bueller's Day Off, The Secret of My Success, and being the theme for Duffman in The Simpsons, among others. The song was also used in a Twix commercial in the 1980s.

== Production ==
Oh Yeah
Opening seconds of the song

Describing the composition of "Oh Yeah," Boris Blank said:

First I did the music and then I invited Dieter to sing along, and he came up with some lines which I thought, 'no Dieter, it's too complicated, we don't need that many lyrics'. I had the idea of just this guy, a fat little monster sits there very relaxed and says, "Oh yeah, oh yeah". So I told him, 'Why don't you try just to sing on and on 'oh yeah'?... Dieter was very angry when I told him this and he said, 'are you crazy, all the time "Oh yeah"? Are you crazy?! I can't do this, no no, come on, come on.' And then he said, 'some lyrics, like "the moon... beautiful", is this too much?!' and I said, 'no, it's OK', and then he did this 'oh yeah' and at the end he thought, 'yeah it's nice', he loved it himself also. And also I wanted to install lots of human noises, all kind of phonetic rhythms with my mouth; you hear lots of noises in the background which are done with my mouth.

== Personnel ==
Yello

- Dieter Meier – lead and background vocals
- Boris Blank – Fairlight CMI, ARP Odyssey, background vocals

Additional personnel

- Petia Kaufman – glass harp

== Charts ==
Chart performance for "Oh Yeah"
Chart (1987–1988)	Peak position
Australia (Australian Music Report)	9
Germany	47
United States (Billboard Hot 100)	51
United States (Dance Club Songs chart)	36

The song has been wildly successful, and was the basis for Dieter Meier's investment fortune, which as of 2017 was valued at an estimated $175 million.

== Remix ==
A remix of the song, entitled, "Oh Yeah Oh Six" went to No. 1 on the US dance charts in 2006.

== Legacy ==
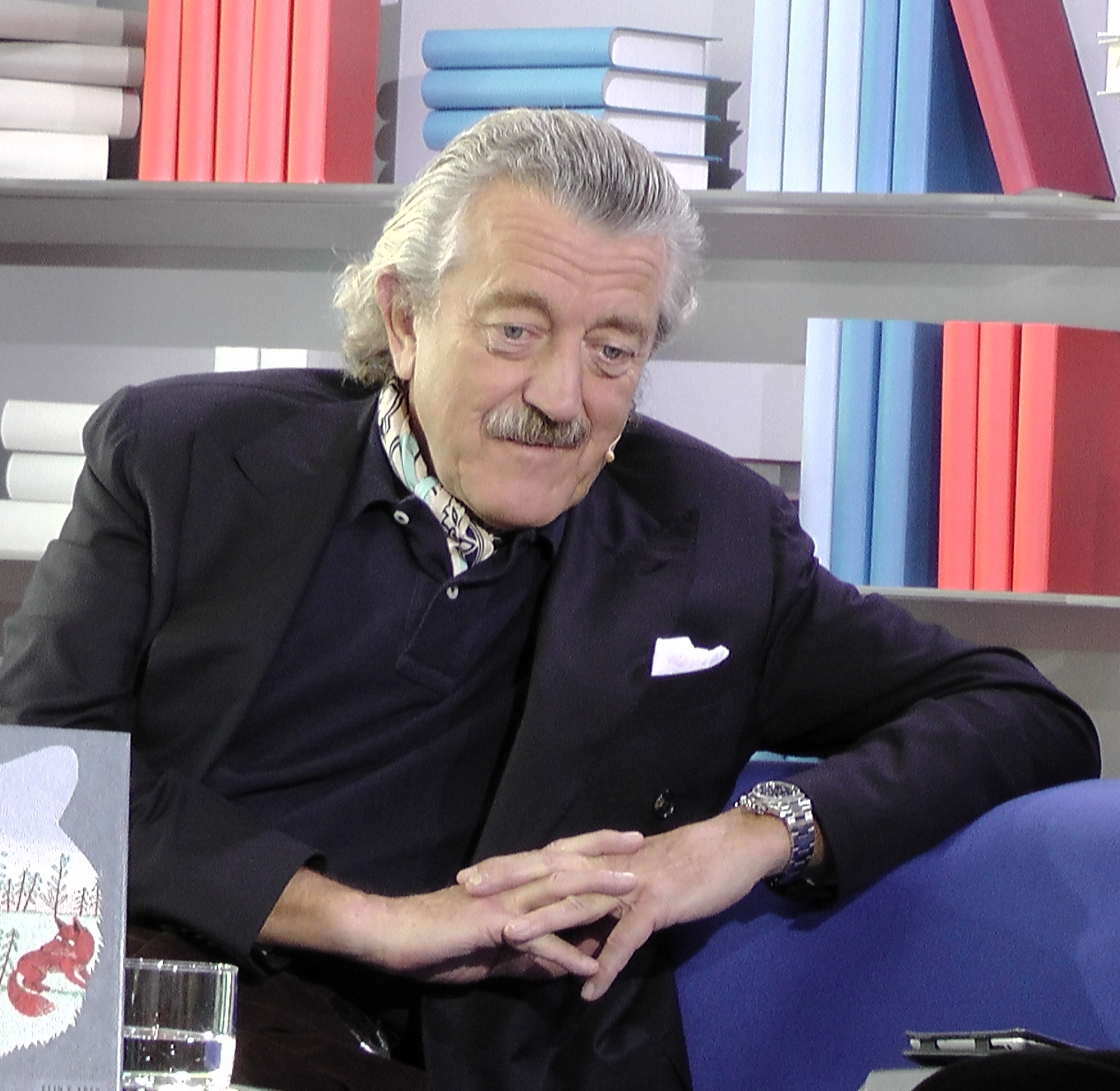
Dieter Meier, vocals

After its use in the 1986 film Ferris Bueller's Day Off — an "incredibly infectious song" from which it became virtually known as "the Ferris Bueller song"—the song was used in various other film soundtracks through the end of the decade and developed a reputation as a 1980s Hollywood cliche. It was prominently used in the 1987 film The Secret of My Success.

Film critic Jonathan Bernstein observed that despite never reaching hit status, the song "has become synonymous with avarice and lust. Every time a movie, TV show or commercial wants to underline the jaw-dropping impact of a hot babe or sleek auto, that synth-drum starts popping and that deep voice rumbles, 'Oh yeah…" A 2014 article on The Dissolve website, suggests the song is used to metaphorically represent lust (in various forms) and cocaine. The song became a conceit on The Simpsons, being used when Duffman appears; an idiomatic staple in video games; and a repeated choice in television advertisements.

Matthew Broderick reprised his Bueller role in a Honda commercial aired during the Super Bowl XLVI, in which "Oh Yeah" was featured. A teaser for the ad had appeared two weeks prior to the Super Bowl, which had created rumors of a possible film sequel. It was produced by Santa Monica–based RPA and directed by Todd Phillips. Adweek's Tim Nudd called the ad "a great homage to the original 1986 film, with Broderick this time calling in sick to a film shoot and enjoying another day of slacking." On the other hand, Jalopnik's Matt Hardigree called the spot "sacrilegious".

Oh Yeah!, a short documentary film about the song and its cultural impact, was released at the Tribeca Festival on June 7, 2025.
