= Ben Rose House =

Home in Highland Park, Illinois

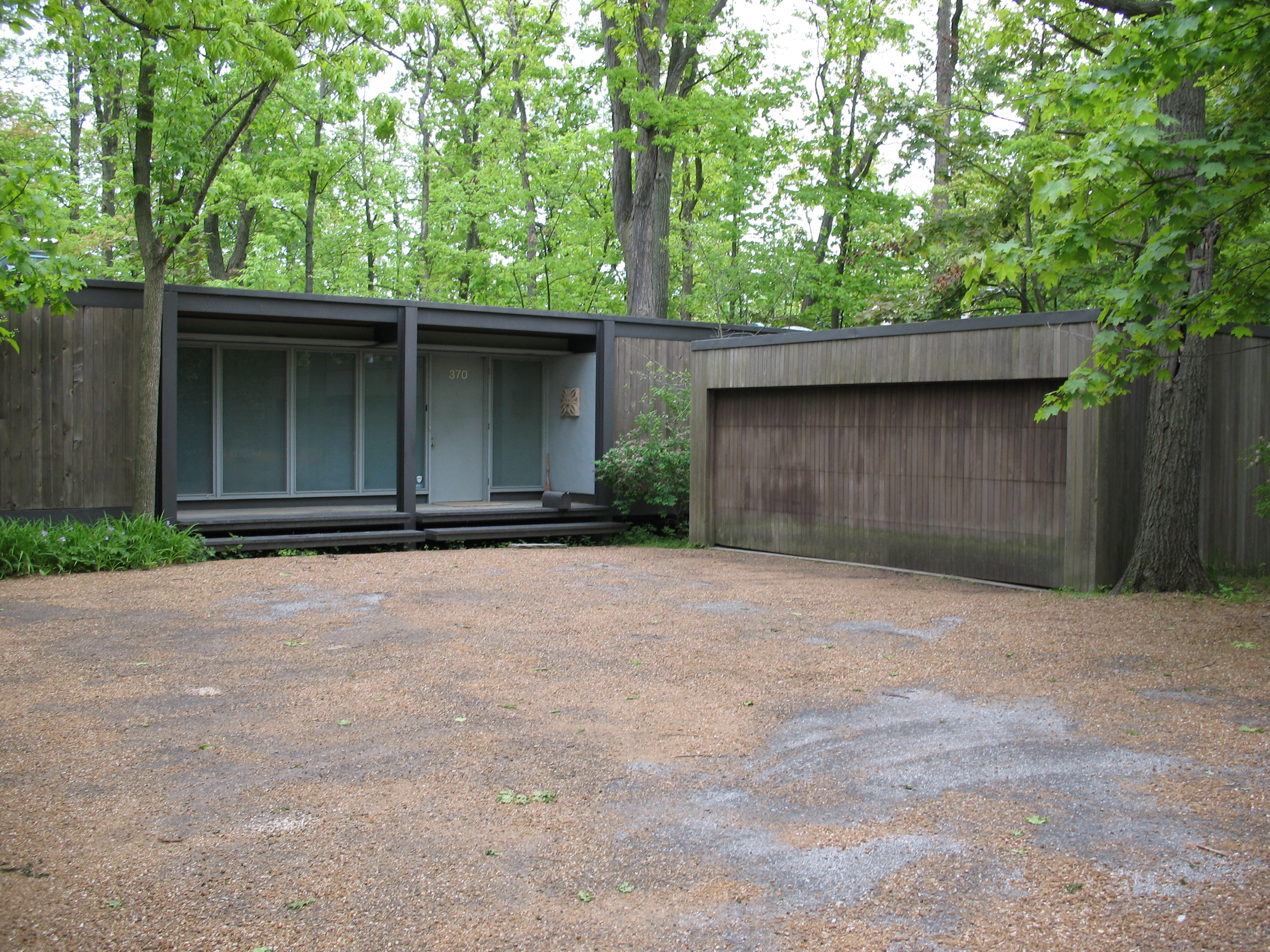
- Ben Rose House
- Interactive map of the Ben Rose House area

General information
- Type: Residential
- Architectural style: International Style, Modernist
- Location: 370 Beech; Highland Park, Illinois US
- Coordinates: 42°10′25″N 87°47′07″W
- Completed: 1953

Design and construction
- Architects: David Haid, A. James Speyer

The Ben Rose House is a private residence designed by modernist architect A. James Speyer, a student of Ludwig Mies van der Rohe. It was built in the Chicago suburb of Highland Park, Illinois, in 1953.

== History and description ==
The property sits "surrounded by trees in a ravine" and "was held up as a model for steel home craftsmanship." Textile artist Ben Rose and his wife, Francis, moved into the property the same year. An adjoining pavilion meant to showcase the Roses' collection of exotic sports cars was added by David Haid, Speyer's student, in 1974. The house was designated an official local landmark in 1987. The two buildings are steel framed, rectangular, glass-and-wood boxes, and similar to Mies' iconic Farnsworth House, are both lifted off the ground on pylons.

The house was featured in the 1986 film Ferris Bueller's Day Off after being selected by filmmaker John Hughes via studio executive Ned Tanen, a Ferrari collector and an acquaintance of Rose. In a famous scene from the movie, a red 1961 Ferrari 250 GT California is crashed through one of the auto pavilion's windows, in which sugar glass had been temporarily installed.

The Ben Rose House was priced at $2.3 million in 2009, but most of the serious inquires came from buyers looking to tear the residence down. It was briefly listed on preservation group Landmark Illinois' list of endangered buildings. It was finally purchased for $1.06 million in 2014.

In 2017, the new owners renovated the property, according to DNAinfo, "digging a 15-foot trench under the house that will become a two-car garage, children's play area, storage space and laundry room. However, its submerged configuration will keep it almost completely hidden" and the adjacent pavilion will be utilized as a guest house or for additional space.

== Gallery ==
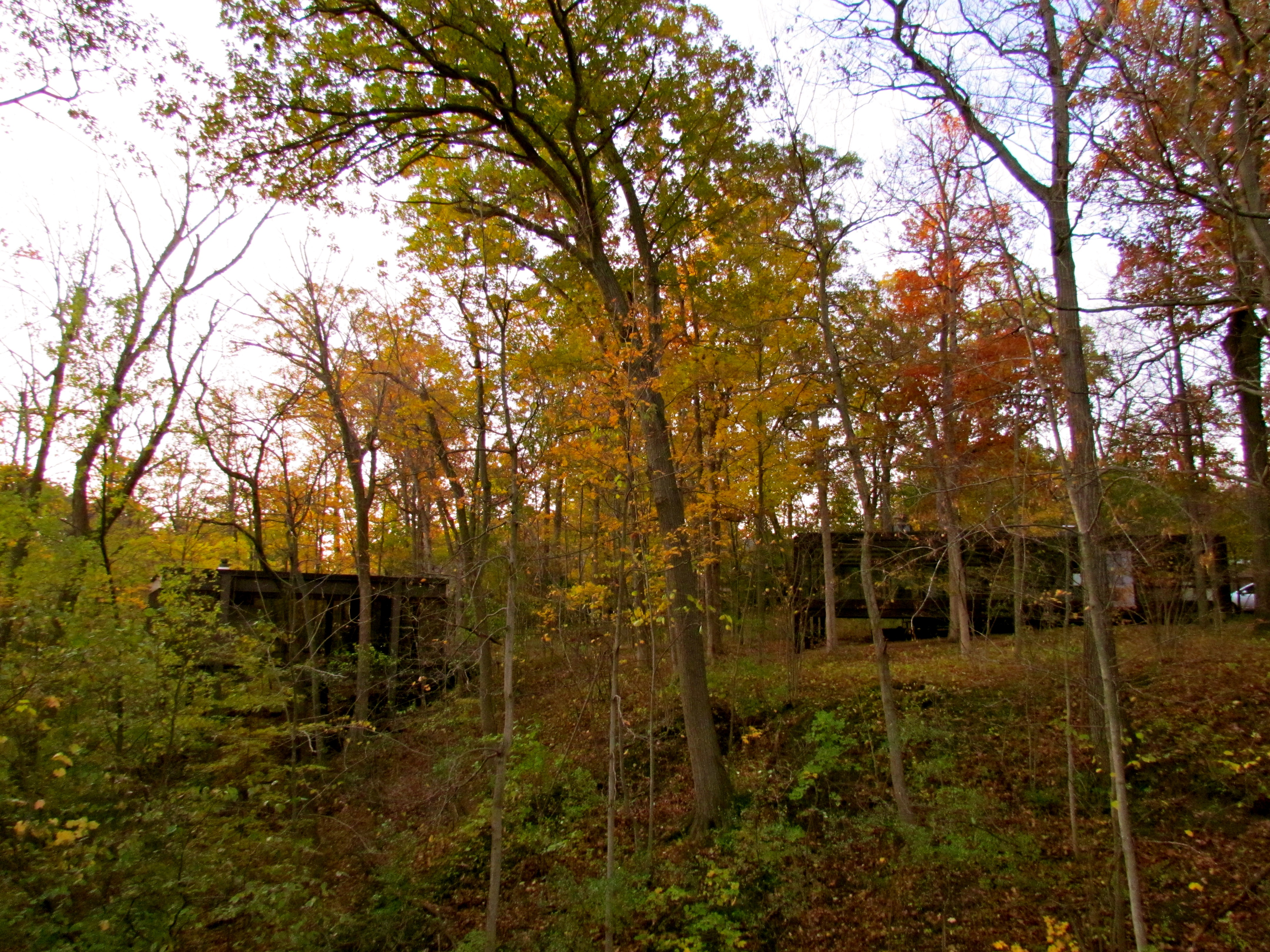

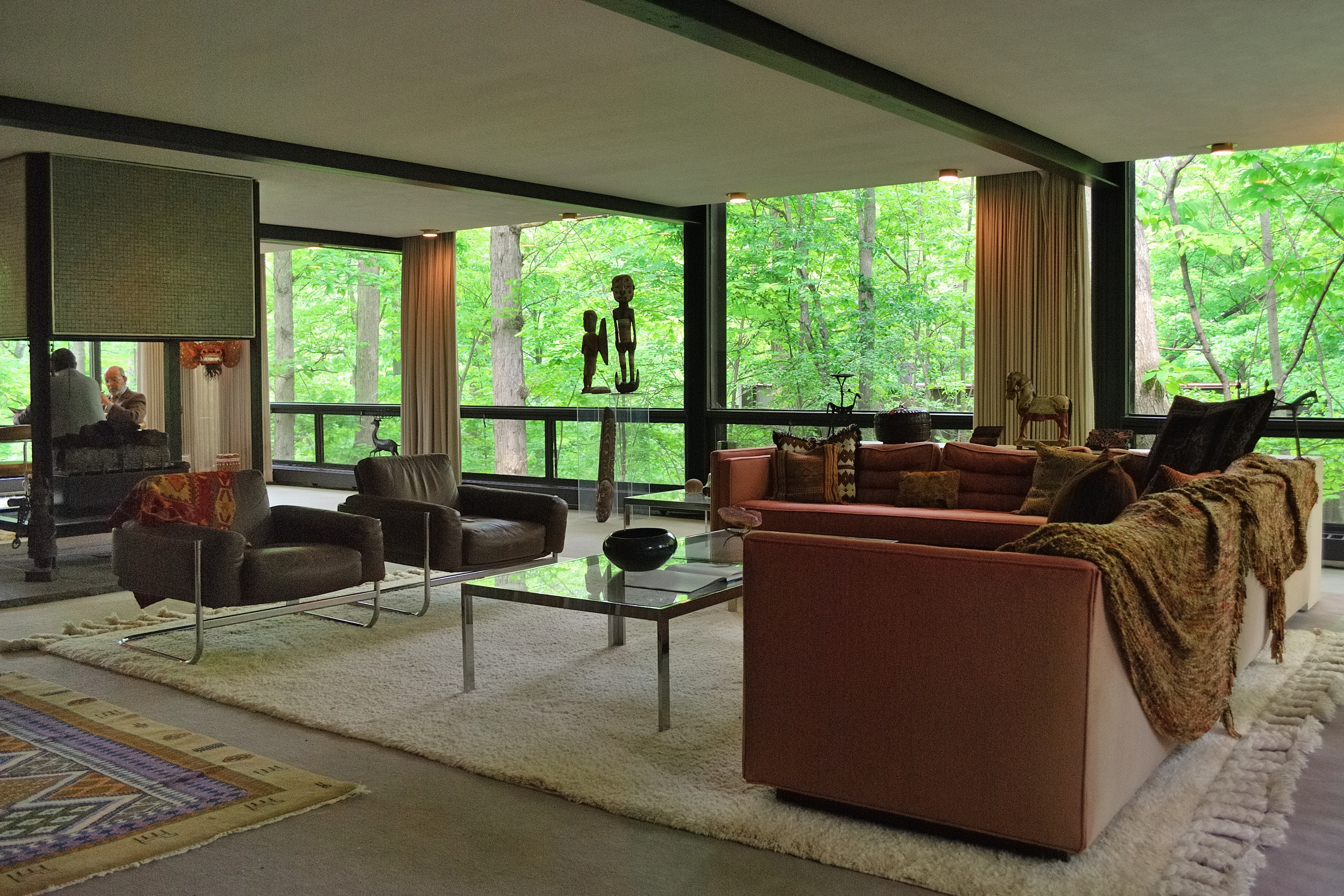

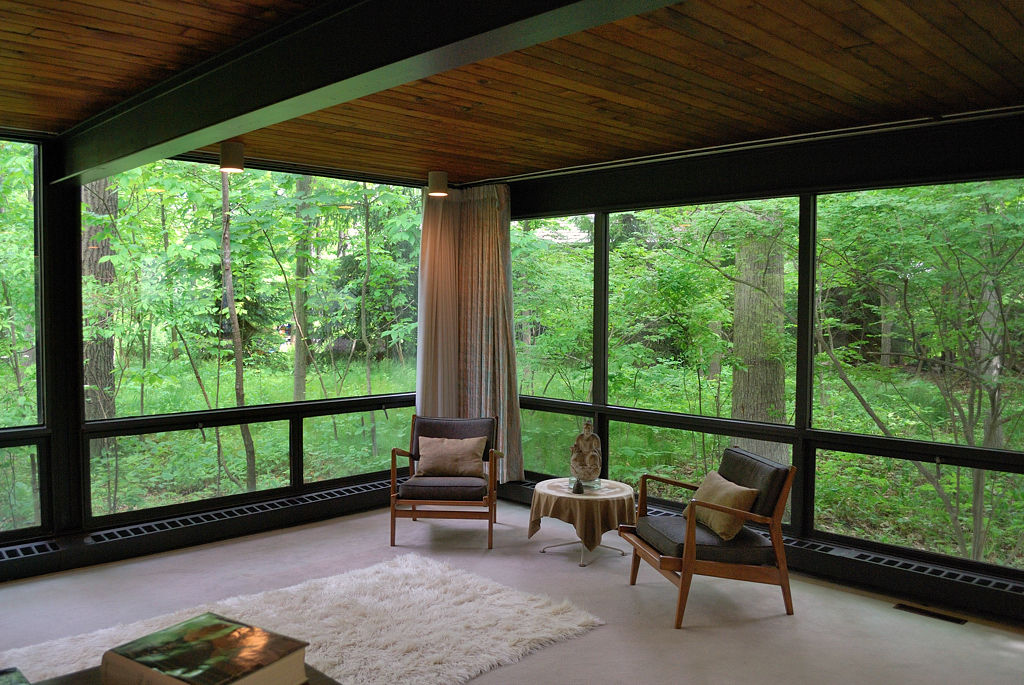

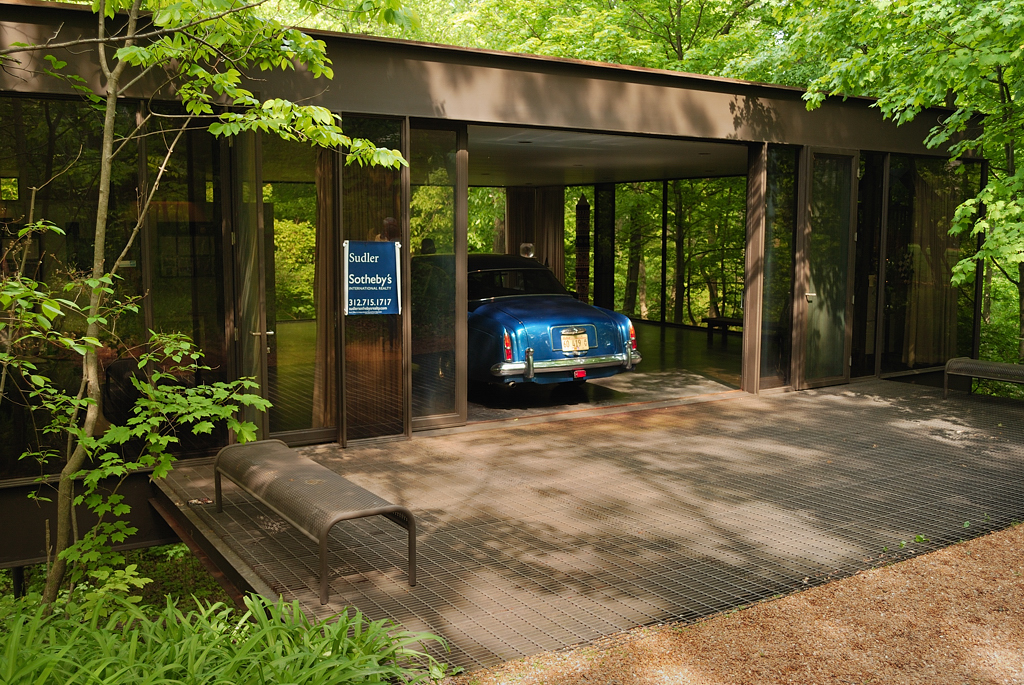

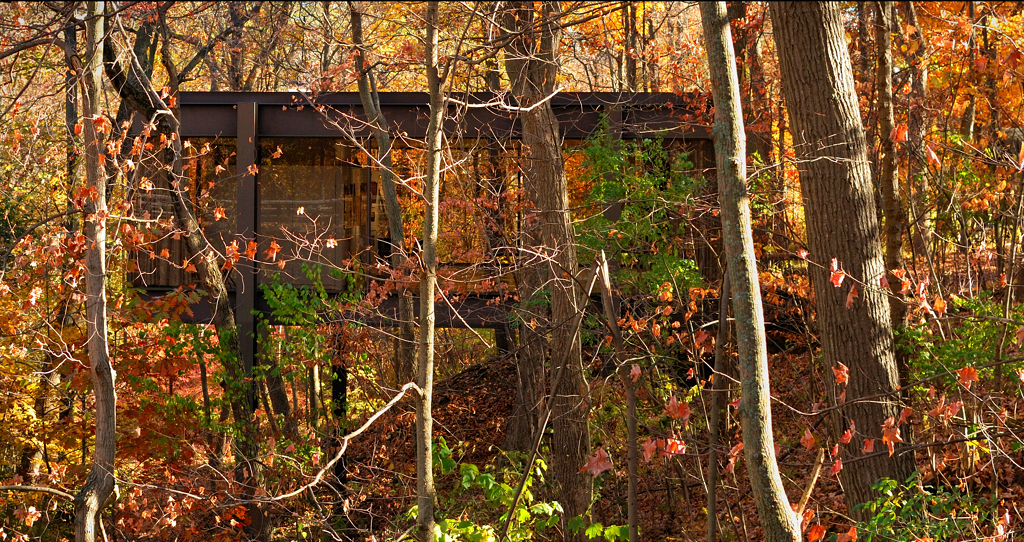

== See also ==
- Farnsworth House
