= Harrington jacket =

Type of jacket

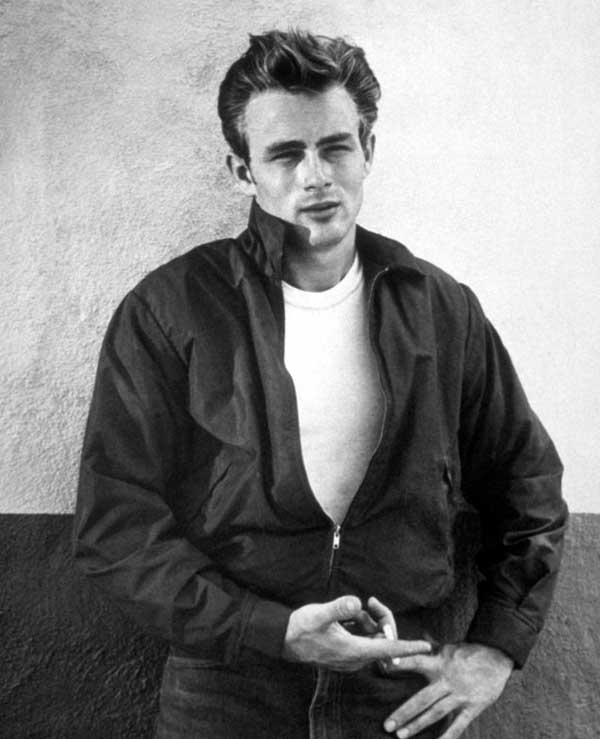
James Dean from the film Rebel Without a Cause wearing a Harrington jacket

A Harrington jacket (originally known only as a Baracuta jacket or a G9) or golf jacket is a type of lightweight, waist-length jacket made of cotton, polyester, wool or suede. Designs often incorporate traditional Fraser tartan or checkerboard-patterned lining.

== History ==
The first Harrington-style jackets were claimed to be made in the 1930s by the British clothing company, Baracuta by two brothers, John and Issac Miller. Baracuta's original design, the G9, is still in production.

The British company Grenfell, previously known as Haythornthwaite and Sons, also claims to have invented an identical jacket around the same time based on their golf jackets, which is also still in production using their own signature cotton. The Harrington from either original source is based on lightweight, roomy jackets worn to play golf hence the G in the G4 or G9 naming convention for Baracuta. Both versions were originally made in Lancashire, England. Baracuta originally manufactured their jacket in Manchester whereas Grenfell were based in Burnley then London.

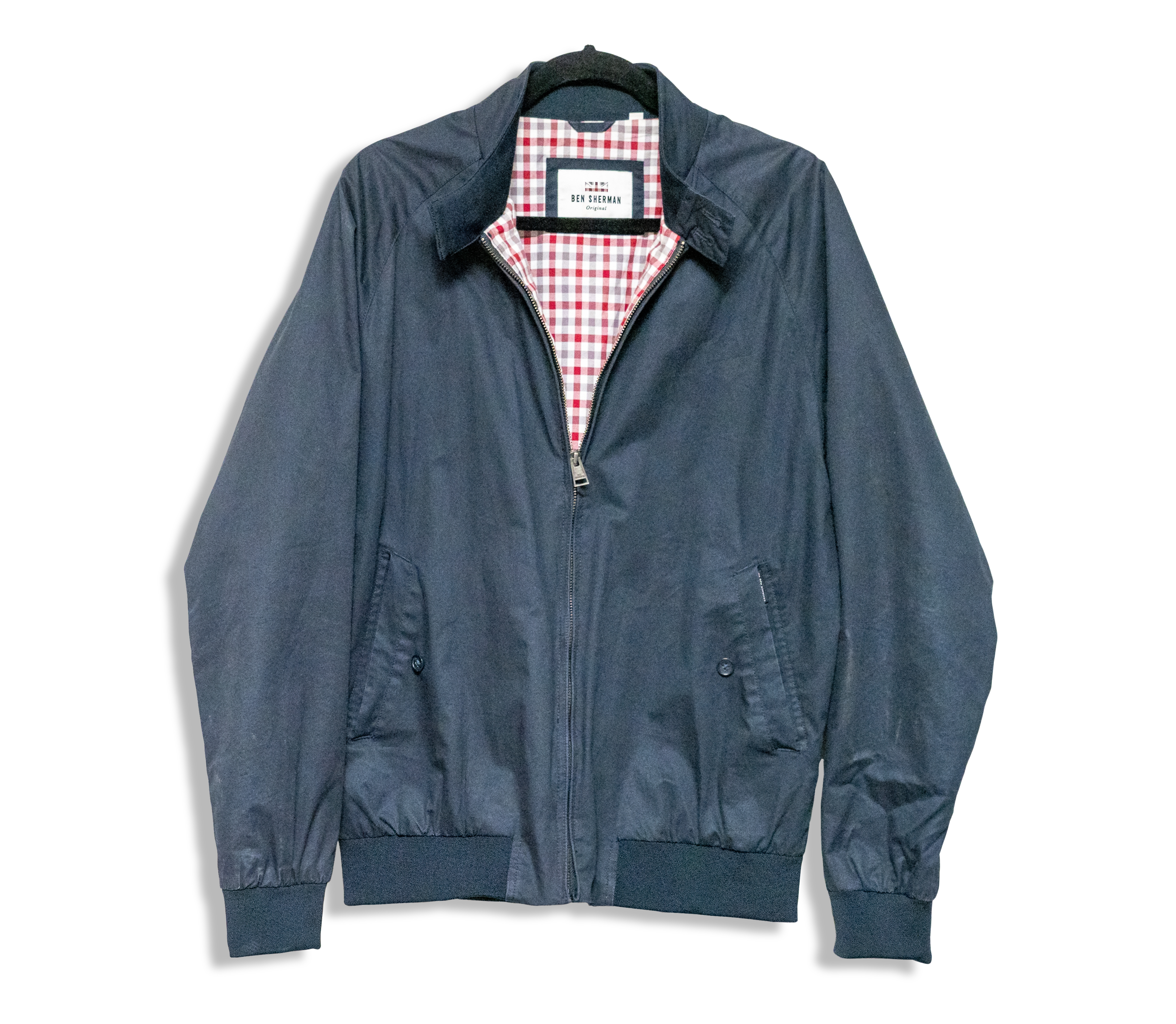
Harrington Jacket by Ben Sherman

The character Rodney Harrington from the television series Peyton Place was so frequently seen wearing Baracuta jackets that the style of jacket came to be named after him.

== Revival ==
During the 1990s during the Britpop culture, the jacket saw an increase in popularity. It was popularised by British groups who were influential in this fashion revival.

== Trademark ==
In France, HARRINGTON has been a registered trademark since 1985.
