= Desire (Yello song) =

Single by Yello

from the album Stella
- Released: June 4, 1985
- Genre: Synthpop
- Length: 3:42
- Label: Elektra
- Songwriter(s): Boris Blank; Dieter Meier
- Producer(s): Yello

Yello singles chronology
"Vicious Games" (1985)	"Desire" (1985)	"Oh Yeah" (1985)

Music video
- "Desire" on YouTube

"Desire" is a song by Swiss electronic band Yello, released in 1985 as the third single from their fourth studio album Stella. The song was written by Yello members Boris Blank and Dieter Meier and appears on the band's compilation album Essential Yello.

== Background ==
"Desire" was released on 4 June 1985. Meier's friend, Swiss TV station owner Paul Grau, had suggested that the video should be shot in Havana in Cuba to match the song's Latin sound, and the video, which included three orchestras and around 150 dancers, was filmed there in May 1985.

== In popular media ==
The song was later used in the Miami Vice episode "Killshot" in 1986, and in the film Dutch in 1991.

== Track listing ==
7" single

No.	Title	Writer(s)	Length
1.	"Desire"	Boris Blank, Dieter Meier	3:42
2.	"Oh Yeah (Indian Summer)"	Boris Blank, Dieter Meier	3:05

== Track listing ==
12" single

No.	Title	Writer(s)	Length
1.	"Desire (Club Mix)"	Boris Blank, Dieter Meier	6:51
2.	"Oh Yeah (Indian Summer Mix)"	Boris Blank, Dieter Meier	5:32

== Charts ==
Chart (1985)	Peak position
Switzerland Swiss Hitparade	19
Germany GfK Entertainment charts	16
