= Vicious Games =

Song by Yello

- Cover of the 12 inch single

Single by Yello

from the album Stella
- B-side: "Blue Nabou"
- Released: February 27, 1985
- Genre: Synthpop
- Length: 4:20
- Label: Elektra
- Songwriter(s): Boris Blank; Dieter Meier
- Producer(s): Yello

Yello singles chronology
"Let Me Cry" (1983)	"Vicious Games" (1985)	"Desire" (1985)

Music video
- "Vicious Games" on YouTube

"Vicious Games" is a song by Swiss electronic band Yello, released in 1985 as the second single from their fourth album Stella. The song also appears on the band's compilation album Essential Yello.

== Background ==
"Vicious Games" was released on 27 February 1985, with a video shot in Yello's Rote Fabrik (Red Factory) working space. The video features Boris Blank and actress Mirjam Montandon miming to Rush Winters' vocals (Winters was not available for the video shoot).

== Track listing ==
7" single

No.	Title	Writer(s)	Length
1.	"Vicious Games"	Boris Blank, Dieter Meier	4:20
2.	"Blue Nabou"	Boris Blank, Dieter Meier	3:19

12" single

No.	Title	Writer(s)	Length
1.	"Vicious Games (Club Mix)"	Boris Blank, Dieter Meier	6:00
2.	"Vicious Games (Instrumental)"	Boris Blank, Dieter Meier	4:12

== Charts ==
Chart (1985)	Peak position
Switzerland (Swiss Hitparade)	5
US Dance Club Songs	8
Australia ARIA Charts	60
Germany GfK Entertainment charts	15

== Re-releases ==
"Vicious Games" has been re-released a number of times over the years, with different remixes. In 1993, with remixes by Mark Picchiotti, Teri Bristol and Maurice Joshua. In 1998, a version released as by Yello vs. Hardfloor came with a plethora of remixes over three 12-inch vinyls, with an additional Art of Trance remix released in 1999 and reached Number 88 in the UK singles charts. Six more remixes of the Yello vs. Hardfloor version was released in 2010.

=== 1993 ===
- Vicious Games (Yello Belly Trippin' Trance Mix) – 6:38
- Vicious Games (Vicious Radio Mix) – 4:34
- Vicious Games (Mo's Dirty Ol Dub #1) – 7:15
- Vicious Games (Vicious Vocal Club Mix) – 7:14

=== 1995 ===
Three remixes by The Grid were released on different formats of the Hands on Yello compilation.

- Vicious Games (12" Edit) – 4:44
- Vicious Games (Ambient Mix) – 4:34
- Vicious Games (Instrumental Acid) – 8:15

=== 1998 ===
- Vicious Games (Hardfloor Remix) – 7:05
- Vicious Games (Slow Vocal Mix) – 6:05
- Vicious Games (Hardfloor Dub Mix) – 5:48
- Vicious Games (Slow Dub Mix) – 5:21
- Vicious Games (Boris Blank & Olaf Wollschläger Remix) – 6:34
- Vicious Games (Vorsprung Durch Technik Remix) – 8:34
- Vicious Games (Da Bomb Mix) – 6:49
- Vicious Games (Blank & Jones Mix) – 6:39
- Vicious Games (Headroom Mix) – 6:53
- Vicious Games (Gorgeous Mix) – 5:20

=== 1999 ===
- Vicious Games (Art of Trance Remix) – 8:07

=== 2010 ===
- Vicious Games (Koen Groeneveld Remix) – 7:41
- Vicious Games (Manuel de la Mare Remix) – 6:47
- Vicious Games (Addy van der Zwan & R3hab Remix) – 6:37
- Vicious Games (Markus Gardeweg Remix) – 7:22
- Vicious Games (Frank Ellrich Remix) – 6:11
- Vicious Games (Lemon Popsicle Remix) – 6:57
