= Rubin Postaer and Associates =

American advertising and marketing agency

RPA
- Type: Private
- Founded: October 1986
- Headquarters: Santa Monica, CA, United States
- Key people: Gerry Rubin, Larry Postaer
- Number of employees: 750
- Website: www.rpa.com

Rubin Postaer and Associates (RPA) is a full-service American advertising and marketing agency headquartered in Santa Monica, California. It was founded in 1986 by Gerry Rubin and Larry Postaer and currently employs more than 700 associates. The agency has regional offices in Portland, Denver, Dallas, Chicago, Atlanta, Boston and Moorestown, New Jersey.

RPA is a full service agency, providing digital, social media, marketing/creative services, branded content/entertainment, market research/consulting, marketing technologies/analytics, media buying/planning, strategy and planning services.

== History ==
Rubin Postaer and Associates (RPA) resulted from the merger of BBDO Worldwide, Doyle Dane Bernbach (DDB) and Needham Harper Worldwide, which together formed Omnicom Group in 1986. Under the merger, DDB and Needham Harper joined forces to become DDB Needham – a move that presented a conflict since the former worked on Volkswagen's advertising business, while the latter worked on Honda's account.

Gerry Rubin and Larry Postaer were heading up Needham Harper Worldwide's Los Angeles office, handling the Honda account. The news of Omnicom's plans to jettison Honda because of the account conflict caused the pair to develop a plan to break out the LA office into its own business so they could keep working with the automaker. When Rubin assured the president of Honda North America that the entire agency staff would stay the same, he was given the green light – and RPA was quickly formed in October 1986.

== Current Clients ==
The RPA website lists Acura, ampm, Apartments.com, ARCO, CKE, Cedars-Sinai, Farmers Insurance, Honda, La-Z-Boy, Los Angeles LGBT Center, Pediatric Brain Tumor Foundation, Pocky, Red Lobster, Southern California Edison, Southwest Airlines, Spectrum Business and TXU Energy as among its current clients.

== Notable campaigns ==
- Honda -- Paper: Emmy-nominated commercial that tells the history of the brand using a stop-motion paper-flipping technique.
- Honda -- Project Drive-in: A national movement to save drive-in theaters.
- Honda -- Matthew's Day Off: Super Bowl campaign teasing a remake of a famous movie.
- Honda -- Yearbooks: Super Bowl campaign for the 20th anniversary of the CR-V used celebrity yearbook photos to demonstrate the Power of Dreams.
- Farmers Insurance -- The More That You See: For Dr. Seuss Day, Farmers reimagined true claims into a Seussian tale.
- Farmers Insurance -- Dog Diving: A dog diving competition based on an actual insurance claim.
- Pediatric Brain Tumor Foundation -- Imaginary Friend Society: A series of animated short films that explore various cancer-related topics in a kid-friendly way.
- La-Z-Boy -- Live Life Comfortably: A long-running campaign to highlight the brand's wide range of furniture offerings.
- Apartments.com—A well-known spokesperson introduces the “Apartminternet”.
- Intuit -- Small Business Big Game: Super Bowl campaign that gave away a Super Bowl commercial to a well-deserving small business.
- ampm -- Toomgis: Spokescharacter whose name stands for “Too Much Good Stuff” and is made out of licorice, cheese curls, cinnamon rolls and hot dogs.
