= Yello discography =

- Studio albums: 15
- Live albums: 1
- Compilation albums: 4
- Singles: 49
- Video albums: 6
- Music videos: 44
- Remix albums: 3
- Box sets: 4
- Promotional albums: 6

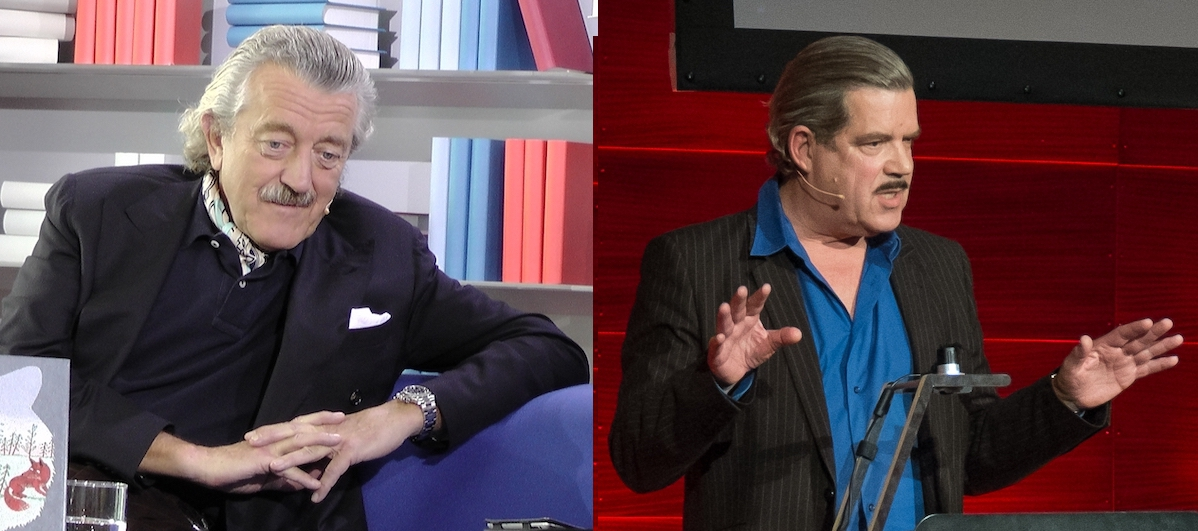
Dieter Meier and Boris Blank of the Swiss musical group Yello

This is the discography of Swiss electronic music band Yello.

== Albums ==
=== Studio albums ===
Title	Album details	Peak chart positions										Certifications
Title	Album details	SWI	AUS	AUT	GER	NL	NOR	NZ	SWE	UK	US	Certifications
Solid Pleasure	Released: 15 October 1980; Label: Ralph, Do It, Vertigo; Formats: LP, MC	—	146	—	—	—	—	—	—	—	—	
Claro Que Si	Released: 22 April 1981; Label: Ralph, Do It, Vertigo; Formats: LP, MC	—	—	—	—	—	—	—	—	—	—	
You Gotta Say Yes to Another Excess	Released: 19 April 1983; Label: Stiff, Elektra, Vertigo; Formats: LP, MC	13	—	—	26	36	—	—	44	65	184	
Stella	Released: 29 January 1985; Label: Elektra, Mercury, Vertigo; Formats: CD, LP, MC	1	—	23	6	—	—	—	26	92	—	GER: Gold
One Second	Released: 4 May 1987; Label: Elektra, Mercury, Vertigo; Formats: CD, LP, MC	4	95	6	11	64	—	36	24	48	92	SWI: Gold
Flag	Released: 31 October 1988; Label: Fontana, Mercury; Formats: CD, LP, MC	3	94	12	11	—	—	33	24	56	152	AUT: Gold; GER: Gold; UK: Silver
Baby	Released: 17 June 1991; Label: Mercury; Formats: CD, LP, MC	5	73	1	6	79	—	—	17	37	—	
Zebra	Released: 17 October 1994; Label: Mercury, 4th & Broadway; Formats: CD, LP, MC	4	197	—	34	—	12	—	19	—	—	SWI: Gold
Pocket Universe	Released: 24 February 1997; Label: Mercury; Formats: CD, 2xLP, MC	7	—	21	17	71	9	—	29	—	—	
Motion Picture	Released: 25 October 1999; Label: Mercury; Formats: CD, MC	13	—	—	23	—	21	—	—	—	—	
The Eye	Released: 3 November 2003; Label: Mercury, Motor; Formats: CD, MC	16	—	—	20	—	—	—	—	—	—	
Touch Yello	Released: 2 October 2009; Label: Polydor/Universal Music Group; Formats: CD	1	—	35	4	—	—	—	—	—	—	SWI: Gold
Toy	Released: 30 September 2016; Label: Polydor/Universal Music Group; Formats: CD, 2×LP, digital download	1	—	16	2	48	—	—	55	84	— (Note: Toy did not enter the Billboard 200, but it did peak at number 20 on the Top Dance/Electronic Albums.)	
Point	Released: 28 August 2020; Label: Polydor/Universal Music Group; Formats: CD, LP, digital download	1	—	5	6	73	—	—	—	—	—	
Time Lab	Scheduled: 30 October 2026; Label: Polydor/Universal Music Group	1	—	5	2	56	—	—	—	—	—	
"—" denotes releases that did not chart or were not released in that territory.

=== Live albums ===
Title	Album details	Peak chart positions
Title	Album details	GER
Live in Berlin	Released: 3 November 2017; Label: Polydor/Universal Music Group; Formats: 2xCD, digital download	38

=== Compilation albums ===
Title	Album details	Peak chart positions				
Title	Album details	SWI	AUS	AUT	GER	SWE
Essential	Released: 29 September 1992; Label: Mercury; Formats: CD, LP, MC	14	148	—	34	36
Yello by Yello – The Singles Collection Including the Videos 1980–2010	Released: 5 November 2010; Label: Polydor; Formats: CD+DVD	14	—	—	24	—
Jungle BIll – Reborn in Vinyl	Released: 29 October 2021; Label: Universal Music; Formats: 10" LP	60	—	—	—	—
Yello 40 Years	Released: 30 April 2021; Label: Polydor/Universal Music Group; Formats: 4xCD, 2xLP	5	—	16	6	—
"—" denotes releases that did not chart or were not released in that territory.

=== Box sets ===
Title	Album details
The 12" Collection	Released: 1988; Label: Mercury; Formats: 6xLP
The CD Single Collection	Released: 1989; Label: Mercury; Formats: 5xCD
Remaster Series	Released: 28 October 2005; Label: Vertigo; Formats: 6xCD
Yello by Yello – The Anthology	Released: 5 November 2010; Label: Polydor; Formats: 3xCD+DVD

=== Remix albums ===
Title	Album details	Peak chart positions				Certifications
Title	Album details	SWI	AUS	GER	NZ	Certifications
1980–1985 The New Mix in One Go	Released: 17 March 1986; Label: Mercury, Vertigo; Formats: CD, 2xLP, MC	18	99	20	40	GER: Gold; SWI: Gold
Hands on Yello	Released: 20 March 1995; Label: Urban; Formats: CD, 2xLP, MC	24	—	35	—	
Eccentrix Remixes	Released: 25 January 1999; Label: Mercury; Formats: CD, MC	30	—	—	—	
"—" denotes releases that did not chart or were not released in that territory.

=== Promotional albums ===
Title	Album details
Snowball and the Sound of Yello	Released: 19 March 1987; Label: Vertigo; Formats: CD
New Work in Progress	Released: 15 March 1994; Label: Mercury; Formats: CD; Work in progress for Zebra
Blame on Yello	Released: October 1994; Label: Mercury; Formats: CD; Steve Blame interview with Dieter Meier and Boris Blank
Progress and Perfection	Released: 21 September 2007; Label: Audi; Formats: CD; Promotional album for the Audi A5
Die besten Hörtest-Aufnahmen aus 30 Jahren Yello-Geschichte	Released: January 2010; Label: Universal Music Group; Formats: CD; Promotional supplement for the German magazine Stereoplay
The Key to Perfection	Released: 4 September 2012; Label: N/A; Formats: CD; Promotional album for the VW Golf 7

== Singles ==
Title	Year	Peak chart positions											Album
Title	Year	SWI	AUS	AUT	BEL (FL)	FIN	GER	NL	NZ	UK	US	US Dance	Album
"I.T. Splash"	1979	—	—	—	—	—	—	—	—	—	—	—	Non-album single
"Bimbo"	1980	—	—	—	—	—	—	—	—	—	—	—	Solid Pleasure
"Night Flanger" (France-only release)	1981	—	—	—	—	—	—	—	—	—	—	—	Solid Pleasure
"Bostich"	1981	—	—	—	—	—	—	—	—	—	—	23	Solid Pleasure
"She's Got a Gun"	1982	—	—	—	—	—	—	—	—	—	—	—	Claro Que Si
"Pinball Cha Cha"	1982	—	—	—	—	—	—	—	—	—	—	—	Claro Que Si
"Zensation" (UK-only release)	1982	—	—	—	—	—	—	—	—	—	—	—	Non-album single
"You Gotta Say Yes to Another Excess"	1982	—	—	—	—	—	—	—	—	—	—	42	You Gotta Say Yes to Another Excess
"I Love You"	1983	—	—	—	3	—	—	12	—	41	103	16	You Gotta Say Yes to Another Excess
"Let Me Cry"	1983	—	—	—	—	—	—	—	—	—	—	—	Stella
"Lost Again"	1983	10	—	—	—	—	26	—	—	73	—	—	You Gotta Say Yes to Another Excess
"Pumping Velvet"/"No More Words" (US and Canada-only release)	1983	—	—	—	—	—	—	—	—	—	—	12	You Gotta Say Yes to Another Excess
"Vicious Games"	1985	5	51	—	33	—	15	38	—	—	—	8	Stella
"Desire"	1985	19	—	—	—	—	16	—	—	—	—	—	Stella
"Oh Yeah"	1985	—	9	—	—	—	47	—	—	—	51	35	Stella
"Goldrush" (featuring Billy MacKenzie on backing vocals)	1986	9	—	—	29	—	20	—	—	54	—	—	One Second
"Call It Love"	1987	6	—	19	—	—	14	—	32	91	—	—	One Second
"The Rhythm Divine" (featuring Shirley Bassey, as well as Billy MacKenzie on backing vocals)	1987	21	—	19	—	—	47	24	—	54	—	—	One Second
"The Race"	1988	8	56	6	20	12	4	14	9	7	—	33 (Note: "The Race" and "Blazing Saddles" jointly charted on the Billboard Dance Club Songs.)	Flag
"Tied Up"	1988	—	—	—	—	—	38	—	—	60	—	9	Flag
"Of Course I'm Lying"	1989	30	123	—	—	—	48	—	—	23	—	—	Flag
"Blazing Saddles"	1989	—	—	—	—	—	78	—	—	47	—	33	Flag
"Unbelievable" (US-only release)	1990	—	—	—	—	—	—	—	—	—	—	22	The Adventures of Ford Fairlane
"Rubberbandman"	1991	9	156	—	—	21	29	—	—	58	—	—	Baby
"Who's Gone"	1991	—	—	—	—	—	—	—	—	—	—	—	Baby
"Jungle Bill"	1992	15	—	—	—	17	—	—	—	61	—	40	Baby
"The Race"/"Bostich" (reissue)	1992	—	—	—	—	—	—	—	—	55	—	—	Essential
"Drive/Driven"	1993	—	—	—	—	—	—	—	—	—	—	—	Essential
"Do It"	1994	32	—	—	—	—	—	—	—	—	—	46	Zebra
"How How"	1994	29	—	—	—	—	96	—	—	59	—	28	Zebra
"Tremendous Pain"	1995	—	—	—	—	—	—	—	—	—	—	7	Zebra
"Bostich" (WestBam's Hands on Yello Remix)	1995	—	—	—	—	2	35	—	—	—	—	—	Hands on Yello
"You Gotta Say Yes to Another Excess – Great Mission" (Jam & Spoon's Hands on Yello Remix)	1995	—	—	—	—	—	28	—	—	—	—	—	Hands on Yello
"Oh Yeah" (Plutone's Hands on Yello Remix)	1995	—	—	—	—	—	—	—	—	—	—	—	Hands on Yello
"Jingle Bells"	1995	34	—	—	—	7	—	—	—	—	—	44	Non-album single
"On Track"	1996	—	—	—	—	—	—	—	—	—	—	16	Pocket Universe
"To the Sea" (featuring Stina Nordenstam)	1996	23	—	—	—	—	83	—	—	—	—	—	Pocket Universe
"La Habanera" (Hands on Yello Remix)	1996	—	—	—	—	—	—	—	—	—	—	11	Hands on Yello
"Vicious Games" (vs Hardfloor)	1999	—	—	—	—	—	—	—	—	88	—	—	Eccentrix Remixes
"Squeeze Please"	1999	—	—	—	—	—	—	—	—	—	—	—	Motion Picture
"Planet Dada"	2003	75	—	—	—	—	—	—	—	—	—	—	The Eye
"Oh Yeah 'Oh Six"	2006	—	—	—	—	—	—	—	—	—	—	1	Non-album single
"Part Love"	2009	15	—	—	—	—	—	—	—	—	—	—	Touch Yello
"Mean Monday"	2011	—	—	—	—	—	—	—	—	—	—	—	Non-album single
"Limbo"	2016	—	—	—	—	—	—	—	—	—	—	—	Toy
"Tool of Love"	2016	—	—	—	—	—	—	—	—	—	—	—	Toy
"Waba Duba"	2020	—	—	—	—	—	—	—	—	—	—	—	Point
"Out of Sight"	2020	—	—	—	—	—	—	—	—	—	—	—	Point
"Spinning My Mind"	2020	—	—	—	—	—	—	—	—	—	—	—	Point
"Around the Sun"	2026	—	—	—	—	—	—	—	—	—	—	—	Time Lab
"Break Out"	2026	—	—	—	—	—	—	—	—	—	—	—	Time Lab
"—" denotes releases that did not chart or were not released in that territory.

== Videos ==
=== Video albums ===
Title	Album details
The Video Singles	Released: 1983; Label: Polygram Music Video; Formats: VHS, Betamax
The Video Race	Released: 1988; Label: Polygram Music Video/Mercury; Formats: VHS
Video Press Kit	Released: 3 May 1989; Label: N/A; Formats: VHS; US promo-only release
The Race Video Mixes	Released: November 1989; Label: RockAmerica; Formats: VHS; US promo-only release
The Yello Video Show – Live at the Roxy NY Dec 83	Released: 1989; Label: Polygram Music Video/Mercury; Formats: VHS
Live in Berlin	Released: 3 November 2017; Label: Polydor/Universal Music Group; Formats: DVD, Blu-ray

=== Music videos ===
Title	Year	Director
"Bostich"	1981	Dieter Meier
"The Evening's Young"	1981	Dieter Meier
"Pinball Cha Cha"	1982	Dieter Meier
"I Love You"	1983	Dieter Meier
"Lost Again"	1984	Dieter Meier
"Vicious Games"	1985	Dieter Meier
"Desire"	1985	Dieter Meier
"Goldrush"	1986	Dieter Meier
"Call It Love"	1987	Dieter Meier
"Rhythm Divine"	1987	Dieter Meier
"Oh Yeah"	1987	Dieter Meier
"The Race"	1988	Dieter Meier
"Tied Up"	1988	Dieter Meier
"Of Course I'm Lying"	1989	Dieter Meier
"Blazing Saddles"	1989	Dieter Meier
"Who's Gone"	1991	Dieter Meier
"Jungle BIll"	1992	Dieter Meier
"Do It"	1994	Dieter Meier
"How How"	1994	Dieter Meier
"Bostich" (WestBam's Hands on Yello)	1995	Unknown
"You Gotta Say Yes to Another Excess – Great Mission" (Jam & Spoon's Hands on Yello)	1995	Unknown
"Tremendous Pain"	1995	Dieter Meier
"On Track"	1997	Dieter Meier
"To the Seas"	1997	Paul Morgans
"Planet Dada"	2003	Dieter Meier and Daniel Cherbuin
"Bostich (Reflected)"	2009	Dieter Meier, Boris Blank and Kevin Blanc
"Tiger Dust"	2009	Dieter Meier, Boris Blank and Kevin Blanc
"The Expert"	2009	Dieter Meier, Boris Blank and Kevin Blanc
"Tangier Blue"	2010	Dieter Meier, Boris Blank and Kevin Blanc
"Mean Monday"	2011	Dieter Meier and Daniel Cherbuin
"Limbo"	2016	Unknown
"Waba Duba"	2020	Boris Blank
"Out of Sight"	2020	N/A (animation)
"Spinning My Mind"	2020	Dieter Meier
"Arthur Spark"	2020	Boris Blank (producer)
"Hot Pan"	2020	Boris Blank (producer)
"Way Down"	2020	Boris Blank (producer)
"Siren Singing"	2020	Boris Blank (producer)
"Basic Avenue"	2020	Boris Blank (producer)
"Rush for Joe"	2020	Boris Blank (producer)
"Meet My Angel"	2020	Fifi Rong
"Core Shift"	2020	Boris Blank (producer)
"Zephyr Calling – Part 1"	2020	Boris Blank (producer)
"Zephyr Calling – Part 2"	2020	Boris Blank (producer)
"The Pick Up (A Portrait)"	2021	EQAL Visual Productions
