= Yello by Yello =

Compilation album by Yello
- Released: 5 November 2010
- Genre: Electronic
- Label: Polydor 0602527531595
- Producer: Boris Blank

Yello chronology
Touch Yello (2009)	Yello by Yello (2010)	The Key to Perfection (2012)

Yello by Yello is a compilation album from Swiss electronic duo Yello. It was released on 5 November 2010 via Polydor label. There are two versions of the album:

- The singles collection 1980–2010 (1 CD and 1 DVD). This remastered album contains 20 tracks plus a new version of the song Vicious Games. It also includes a DVD with 23 videos from 1980–2009.
- The anthology box set (3 CDs and 1 DVD). This remastered box set contains The Singles Collection 1980–2010 and the two-CD The Anthology for which Dieter Meier and Boris Blank selected their favorite songs. A DVD with 23 videos and a 48-page booklet with photographs and personal commentary by Yello are included.

Some copies of The Singles Collection 1980–2010 have a production error. The song Lost Again (track 16) is missing, while the song Desire appears twice on the disc (tracks 16 and 20).

== The Singles Collection 1980–2010 ==
This disc is part of both versions of the album. It contains one new song: Vicious Games (2010).

No.	Title	Note	Length	Year	Album
1.	"Vicious Games 2010"	Feat. Heidi Happy	3:09	2010	-
2.	"Tremendous Pain"	-	3:32	1994	Zebra
3.	"The Race"	-	3:15	1988	Flag
4.	"To The Sea"	Feat. Stina Nordenstam	3:52	1997	Pocket Universe
5.	"Planet Dada"	Co-produced by Hakan Lidbo	3:06	2003	The Eye
6.	"Oh Yeah"	-	3:05	1985	Stella
7.	"The Expert"	-	2:54	2009	Touch Yello
8.	"Bimbo"	-	3:36	1980	Solid Pleasure
9.	"Bostich (Reflected)"	-	2:31	2009	Touch Yello
10.	"How How"	-	2:39	1994	Zebra
11.	"She's Got A Gun"	Live at the Palladium NY 1985	4:01	1985	Claro Que Si
12.	"Part Love"	-	3:38	2009	Touch Yello
13.	"Drive/Driven"	-	4:18	1991	Baby
14.	"Rubberbandman"	-	3:35	1991	Baby
15.	"Goldrush"	-	4:28	1987	One Second
16.	"Lost Again"	-	4:19	1983	You Gotta Say Yes to Another Excess
17.	"Who's Gone"	-	3:20	1991	Baby
18.	"Squeeze Please"	-	3:14	1999	Motion Picture
19.	"Of Course I'm Lying"	-	3:50	1988	Flag
20.	"Desire"	-	3:50	1985	Stella
21.	"The Rhythm Divine"	Feat. Shirley Bassey	4:20	1987	One Second

== The Anthology Vol. 1 ==
This disc has only been released as part of the anthology box set. It contains three new songs: Dialectical Kid, Liquid Lies (2010), and Tears Run Dry.

No.	Title	Note	Length	Year	Album
1.	"Dialectical Kid"	-	3:04	2010	-
2.	"Liquid Lies (2010)"	-	3:43	2010	-
3.	"Tears Run Dry"	Feat. Malia	3:42	2010	-
4.	"Out of Dawn"	-	3:10	2009	Touch Yello
5.	"Distant Solution"	Feat. Jade Davies	3:50	2003	The Eye
6.	"Soul On Ice"	-	3:12	2003	The Eye
7.	"Stay"	Feat. Heidi Happy	3:02	2009	Touch Yello
8.	"Junior B"	Feat. Jade Davies	3:59	2003	The Eye
9.	"S.A.X."	-	3:13	1994	Zebra
10.	"Tangier Blue"	-	2:39	2009	Touch Yello
11.	"Fat Cry"	-	4:11	1994	Zebra
12.	"Time Palace"	Feat. Jade Davies	3:43	2003	The Eye
13.	"Oh Yeah 2009"	-	2:27	2009	Touch Yello
14.	"Star Breath"	-	4:55	2003	The Eye
15.	"Tiger Dust"	The Virtual Concert	3:07	2003	The Eye
16.	"Get On"	-	3:18	1999	Motion Picture
17.	"Kiss In Blue"	-	3:33	2009	Touch Yello
18.	"Move Dance Be Born"	-	6:03	1994	Zebra
19.	"Poom Shanka"	-	3:26	1994	Zebra
20.	"Planet Dada (Flamboyant)"	-	4:40	2003	The Eye

Note: "Dialectical Kid" was later released on their 2016 album Toy.

== The Anthology Vol. 2 ==
This disc has only been released as part of the anthology box set. It contains no new songs.

No.	Title	Note	Length	Year	Album
1.	"Solar Driftwood"	-	1:51	1997	Pocket Universe
2.	"Time Freeze"	-	3:52	1999	Motion Picture
3.	"Moon On Ice"	Feat. Billy Mackenzie	4:15	1987	One Second
4.	"The Evening's Young"	-	3:10	1981	Claro Que Si
5.	"Angel No"	Feat. Rush Winters	3:06	1985	Stella
6.	"Base For Alec"	-	2:56	1983	You Gotta Say Yes to Another Excess
7.	"Capri Calling"	Feat. Billy Mackenzie	3:02	1991	Baby
8.	"Sometimes (Dr. Hirsch)"	-	3:34	1985	Stella
9.	"Otto Di Catania"	-	3:23	1988	Flag
10.	"Ciel Ouvert"	-	5:22	1985	Stella
11.	"Swing"	-	3:28	1983	You Gotta Say Yes to Another Excess
12.	"You Gotta Say Yes to Another Excess"	-	2:09	1983	You Gotta Say Yes to Another Excess
13.	"La Habanera"	-	3:39	1987	One Second
14.	"Koladi-ola"	-	2:57	1985	Stella
15.	"Daily Disco"	-	4:05	1981	Claro Que Si
16.	"Crash Dance"	-	2:10	1983	You Gotta Say Yes to Another Excess
17.	"Si Senor The Hairy Grill"	-	4:51	1987	One Second
18.	"Homer Hossa"	-	5:14	1981	Claro Que Si
19.	"Downtown Samba"	-	2:37	1980	Solid Pleasure
20.	"I.T. Splash"	-	2:37	1980	Solid Pleasure
21.	"Night Flanger"	-	4:53	1980	Solid Pleasure
