= Jungle Bill =

Single by Yello

from the album Baby
- B-side: "Blender"
- Released: 24 August 1992
- Genre: Synthpop
- Length: 6:12 (album version); 3:35 (single version); 3:53 (1992 version)
- Label: Mercury; Smash
- Songwriters: Boris Blank; Dieter Meier
- Producer: Yello

Yello singles chronology
"Who's Gone?" (1991)	"Jungle Bill" (1992)	"Drive/Driven" (1993)

Music video
- "Jungle Bill" on YouTube

"Jungle Bill" is a song by Swiss electronic band Yello, released in August 1992 by Mercury and Smash Records, as the third single from their seventh album, Baby (1991). The song was written by Yello members Boris Blank and Dieter Meier and also appears on the band's compilation album Essential Yello.

== Track listings ==
7" single

No.	Title	Writer(s)	Length
1.	"Jungle Bill"	Boris Blank, Dieter Meier	3:35
2.	"Blender"	Boris Blank, Dieter Meier	4:38

12" single

No.	Title	Writer(s)	Length
1.	"Jungle Bill (Big Pig Shuffle)"	Boris Blank, Dieter Meier	6:22
2.	"Jungle Bill (Voodoo Fudge Mix)"	Boris Blank, Dieter Meier	8:24
3.	"Jungle Bill (Chicken Dive Mix)"	Boris Blank, Dieter Meier	8:39
4.	"Jungle Bill (Space Shuffle)"	Boris Blank, Dieter Meier	7:59

CD single

No.	Title	Writer(s)	Length
1.	"Jungle Bill (Single Version)"	Boris Blank, Dieter Meier	3:50
2.	"Jungle Bill (Big Pig Shuffle)"	Boris Blank, Dieter Meier	6:22
3.	"Jungle Bill (Space Shuffle)"	Boris Blank, Dieter Meier	7:59

== Charts ==
Chart (1992)	Peak position
Switzerland (Swiss Hitparade)	15
Germany GfK Entertainment charts	29
UK Singles (OCC)	61
UK Dance (Music Week)	15
UK Club Chart (Music Week)	42
US Dance Club Songs (Billboard)	40
