= The Key to Perfection =

Studio album other by Yello
- Released: 4 September 2012
- Genre: Electronica, synthpop
- Length: 22:49
- Label: Not on label
- Producer: Yello

Yello chronology
Yello by Yello (2010)	The Key to Perfection (2012)	Toy (2016)

Singles from The Key to Perfection
- 1. "Mean Monday" Released: 30 September 2011

The Key to Perfection is a promo album by Swiss electronic duo Yello, released on 4 September 2012. It was not released on a label, and was distributed by Volkswagen officials at special events. The record contains additional vocals by Billy Mackenzie (on track 3), Heidi Happy (on track 4), and Malia (on track 7).

== Background ==
The Key to Perfection is a soundtrack for the new VW Golf 7. The album has all new remixed modern versions of celebrated songs: "The Race", "Oh Yeah/Goldrush", "Vicious Games", and "Desire". All the classic songs have been re-imagined in a new modern style.

== Track listing ==
All lyrics are written by Dieter Meier; all music is composed by Boris Blank, ℗ & © 2009 Yello

No.	Title	Length
1.	"The Key — Der Song zum Golf"	3:04
2.	"The Race"	2:45
3.	"Oh Yeah/Goldrush" (Additional vocals – Billy Mackenzie)	3:08
4.	"Vicious Games" (Additional vocals – Heidi Happy)	2:28
5.	"Desire"	4:23
6.	"Blue Horizon PM"	3:31
7.	"Mean Monday" (Additional vocals – Malia)	3:30
