= The Race (Yello song) =

1988 single by Yello

Single by Yello

from the album Flag
- B-side: "Another Race"
- Released: 11 April 1988
- Genre: Synth-pop; nu-jazz
- Length: 8:11 (album version); 3:22 (single version); 13:23 (12-inch mix)
- Label: Fontana
- Songwriters: Boris Blank; Dieter Meier
- Producer: Yello

Yello singles chronology
"Oh Yeah" (1987 version) (1987)	"The Race" (1988)	"Tied Up" (1988)

Music video
- "The Race" on YouTube

"The Race" is a song by Swiss electronic band Yello, released as the first single from their album Flag. The single was initially released on 11 April 1988 via the Fontana label.

== Release history ==
In 1988, the single was released on 7-inch, 12-inch and CD formats throughout the world, and additionally as a cassette single in some places. The limited edition single contained a remix by Paul Dakeyne. The following year, the track was remixed again by Carl Segal and released as a couple of promotional-only 12-inch singles, coupled with Emilio Pasquez's versions of "Blazing Saddles".

In 1992, "The Race" was released as a single a second time, to coincide with the greatest hits collection, Essential Yello.

"The Race" appeared in remix form again in 1999 for the Eccentrix Remixes compilation, following the release of their Pocket Universe album.

In 2003, the Tomcraft remixes of "The Race" appeared on the single for "Planet Dada", released from their album, The Eye.

Since its release, "The Race" has been very popular and played among marching bands across the United States.

In 2007, a new version of the track was created by the band in order to promote DHL and Formula 1 racing. Called "The Race II", the digital single was made available free for download, and released as a promo CD single.

== Promotional video ==
A stock footage–infused video was also created for the song, displaying an abstract race. It was directed by Dieter Meier. This video was released on the CD-Video format.

Yello have also been known to sponsor remixes of their work. For example, in 1989, RockAmerica created a video remix contest on behalf of Yello named "The Race (Video Remix Contest)" in which participants had to video mix the hit recording "The Race". The competition winners Jeff Consiglio and Vincent Zegna remixed the track and video, taking the main award and having the video released through RockAmerica.

== Charts ==
=== Weekly charts ===
Chart (1988)	Peak position
Australia (Australian Music Report)	56
Austria (Ö3 Austria Top 40)	6
Belgium (Ultratop 50 Flanders)	20
Ireland (IRMA)	8
Netherlands (Dutch Top 40)	20
Netherlands (Single Top 100)	14
New Zealand (Recorded Music NZ)	9
South Africa (Springbok Radio)	1
Switzerland (Schweizer Hitparade)	8
UK Singles (Official Charts)	7
West Germany (GfK)	4

=== Year-end charts ===
Chart (1988)	Position
Austria (Ö3 Austria Top 40)	14
Switzerland (Schweizer Hitparade)	28
UK Singles (OCC)	76
West Germany (Media Control)	20

== In popular culture ==
The song was used to open It's Academic on WRC-TV in Washington, D.C. from the 1990-91 season to June 2017 (it was replaced by a new theme starting with the 2017–18 season, which is used throughout the show). It was also the theme of Academic Challenge on WEWS-TV in Cleveland from 1996 to 1999 (the last years of its original run), by which time it was also known as It's Academic.

From 1988 onward, "The Race" was used as theme song for popular German video clip show Formel Eins.

The pan-European sports channel Eurosport commonly used the song in the early 90s.

It is also featured in the 1990 comedy films Nuns on the Run, For Richer or Poorer and Opportunity Knocks.

It was additionally used in the early 1990s as menu music on Grandstand, the long-running weekly Saturday afternoon BBC sports programme.

The song was used in the third episode of the fourth series of ITV sitcom Benidorm, during a Grand Prix race between Madge Harvey and Mr. Pink.

The song was used in the 1992 film The Cutting Edge as the ice skating pair's USA Nationals and Olympic Short Programs routine song.

The song was used in the 2006 film The Pink Panther.

The song was played just before the Norwegian politician Siv Jensen held her famous "morna Jens!" speech on the night of Norway's 2013 election.

An orchestral version of the song was used in Season 5 of the TV series Babylon Berlin.
