= Eccentrix Remixes =

Remix album by Yello
- Released: January 25, 1999
- Genre: Electronica
- Length: 63:49
- Label: Mercury/PolyGram Records; 538 584
- Producer: Yello

Yello chronology
Pocket Universe (1997)	Eccentrix Remixes (1999)	Motion Picture (1999)

Professional ratings
Review scores
Source	Rating
Allmusic	2.5/5 stars

Eccentrix Remixes is a 1999 remix album by Yello. It was released on January 25, 1999, on Mercury Records label.

== Track listing ==
1. "The Race" (Brake Light Mix)" – 6:50
2. "How How (Papa-Who-Ma-Mix)" (Remixer: Fluke) – 5:51
3. "More (Rockabilly Mix)" – 6:14
4. "Do It" (Marky P. & Teri B. Dub) – 7:46
5. "Topaz" (Insect Mix) – 3:36
6. "How How (In Silence Mix)" (Remixer: Plutone) – 4:32
7. "On Track (Doug Laurent's First Journey)" – 7:33
8. "Vicious Games" (Boris Blank & Olaf Wollschläger Mix) – 6:34
9. "Rubberbandman" (Rubber Mix) – 5:57
10. "She's Got a Gun (Live at the Palladium N.Y.)" – 4:08
11. "To the Sea (TSWL Mix)" (Remixer: Ian Pooley) – 4:48
