= Solid Pleasure =

Studio album by Yello
- Released: 15 October 1980
- Recorded: 1980
- Studios: Yello Studio, Zürich; Platinum One Studio, Zürich
- Genres: Synth-pop; electronic; experimental; ambient
- Length: 41:05
- Labels: Ralph (original US release), Mercury (1985 US reissue), Do It (original UK release), Vertigo (1984 European release)
- Producers: Yello, Ursli Weber

Yello chronology
Solid Pleasure (1980)	Claro Que Si (1981)

Singles from Solid Pleasure
- 1. "Bimbo" Released: 1980 (US & UK); 2. "Night Flanger" Released: 1980 (FR); 3. "Bostich" Released: 25 September 1981

Professional ratings
Review scores
Source	Rating
AllMusic	4/5 stars
The Guardian	4/5 stars
Mojo	3/5 stars

Solid Pleasure is the debut album by Swiss electronic band Yello. It was first released in 1980 and was reissued in 2005 in part of Yello Remaster Series with rare bonus tracks.

== Track listing ==
No.	Title	Writer(s)	Length
1.	"Bimbo"	Boris Blank, Dieter Meier	3:38
2.	"Night Flanger"	Blank, Meier	4:53
3.	"Reverse Lion"	Blank, Meier	1:21
4.	"Downtown Samba"	Blank, Meier	2:37
5.	"Magneto"	Blank	2:47
6.	"Massage"	Blank	1:37
7.	"Assistant's Cry"	Blank, Meier, Carlos Perón	1:40
8.	"Bostich"	Blank, Meier	2:13
9.	"Rock Stop"	Blank, Meier	2:31
10.	"Coast to Polka"	Blank	1:55
11.	"Blue Green"	Blank, Perón	5:26
12.	"Eternal Legs"	Blank	4:16
13.	"Stanztrigger"	Blank, Perón	2:49
14.	"Bananas to the Beat"	Blank, Meier	3:03
Total length:			41:05

2005 reissue bonus tracks
No.	Title	Writer(s)	Length
15.	"Thrill Wave"	Blank, Meier	2:05
16.	"I.T. Splash"	Blank, Meier	2:37
17.	"Gluehead"	Blank, Meier	2:53
18.	"Smirak's Train"	Blank	4:39
19.	"Bostich (N'est-ce Pas)"	Blank, Meier	4:35

== Personnel ==
Yello

- Dieter Meier – vocals
- Boris Blank – keyboards, sampling, vocals on "Eternal Legs"
- Carlos Perón – tape effects

with:

- Chico Hablas – guitar
- Felix Haug – drums
- Walt Keiser – drums

== Charts ==
Solid Pleasure was released in 1980, and later spent a solitary week on the Australian ARIA charts at number 146 in July 1991, with their album Baby debuting the same week.

Chart (1991)	Peak position
Australian Albums (ARIA Charts)	146
