= Lost Again =

Single by Yello

from the album You Gotta Say Yes to Another Excess
- B-side: "Base for Alec"
- Released: 18 October 1983
- Genre: Electronic, synthpop, new wave
- Length: 4:18
- Label: Stiff Records, Vertigo Records, Polydor Records
- Songwriter(s): Boris Blank, Dieter Meier
- Producer(s): Yello, Ursli Weber

Yello singles chronology
"Let Me Cry" (1983)	"Lost Again" (1983)	"Pumping Velvet" (1983)

Music video
- Lost Again on YouTube

"Lost Again" is a song by Swiss electronic band Yello, released by Stiff Records in 1983 as the fourth single from Yello's third album You Gotta Say Yes to Another Excess.

== Track listing ==
7" single

No.	Title	Writer(s)	Length
1.	"Lost Again"	Boris Blank, Dieter Meier	4:18
2.	"Base For Alec"	Boris Blank	2:53

== Track listing ==
12" single

No.	Title	Writer(s)	Length
1.	"Lost Again (Extended Version)"	Boris Blank, Dieter Meier	7:20
2.	"I Love You (Extended)"	Boris Blank, Dieter Meier	7:02
3.	"Bostich (N'est-ce pas)"	Boris Blank, Dieter Meier	4:30

== In popular media ==
The song was used in the Steve Martin and John Candy movie Planes, Trains and Automobiles, and also as the intro for the last series of BBC 2's Oxford Road Show.

== Charts ==
Chart (1983–84)	Peak position
Switzerland (Schweizer Hitparade)	10
Germany GfK Entertainment charts	26
UK Singles (OCC)	73
