= Progress and Perfection =

Studio album by Yello
- Released: 21 September 2007
- Genre: Electronica
- Length: 22:03
- Label: not on label
- Producer: Yello

Yello chronology
The Eye (2003)	Progress and Perfection (2007)	Touch Yello (2009)

Progress and Perfection is a promo album by Swiss electronic duo Yello, released on 21 September 2007. It was not released on a label, and was distributed by Audi officials on special events. The record was limited to 350 copies. Only the first two tracks have vocals; the others are instrumentals.

== Track listing ==
All lyrics are written by Dieter Meier; all music is composed by Boris Blank

No.	Title	Length
1.	"Countdown"	1:24
2.	"Distant Light"	3:42
3.	"Driving Force"	0:56
4.	"Umbria"	2:32
5.	"Kite Vision"	0:38
6.	"Chasing the Horizon"	1:57
7.	"Distant Light (Instrumental)"	1:24
8.	"Topaz"	3:33
9.	"Pacific Rim"	5:20
10.	"Kite One"	0:41

== Personnel ==
- Lyrics By, Vocals – Dieter Meier (tracks: 1, 2)
- Music By, Arranged By, Engineer – Boris Blank
- Producer – Yello
