= One Second (Yello album) =

Studio album by Yello
- Released: 4 May 1987
- Recorded: 1987
- Genre: Synth-pop
- Length: 53:01
- Labels: Mercury (original release), Vertigo (2005 CD reissue)
- Producer: Boris Blank

Yello chronology
1980–1985 The New Mix in One Go (1986)	One Second (1987)	Flag (1988)

Singles from One Second
- 1. "Goldrush" Released: August 1986; 2. "Call It Love" Released: 2 March 1987; 3. "The Rhythm Divine" Released: 24 June 1987

Audio sample
- "The Rhythm Divine": file; help

Professional ratings
Review scores
Source	Rating
AllMusic	3/5 stars

One Second is Yello's fifth original studio album, having been preceded by a 'new mix' compilation the previous year. Released in 1987, the album is noteworthy for featuring both Billy Mackenzie and Shirley Bassey, the latter singing vocals on "The Rhythm Divine".

The songs "Call It Love", "Si Senor The Hairy Grill", "Moon On Ice", "Hawaiian Chance" were used on episodes of Miami Vice and the song "Santiago" used as a sample from Dunya Yunis' "Abu Zeluf". A couple of songs were also used in the 1990 film Nuns on the Run.

The song "Si Senor The Hairy Grill" was used as theme song for the Fox TV show The Edge.

== Track listing ==
1. "La Habanera" - 5:10
2. "Moon on Ice" - 4:12
3. "Call It Love" - 5:05
4. "Le Secret Farida" - 3:17
5. "Hawaiian Chance" - 4:18
6. "The Rhythm Divine" - 4:10
7. "Santiago" - 5:48
8. "Goldrush" - 4:20
9. "Dr. Van Steiner" - 4:18
10. "Si Senor the Hairy Grill" - 4:30

+ Bonus on CD editions : L'Hôtel (B-side of Call it Love single)

"Oh Yeah" is an addition to the US version of the album, the track is originally on the previous album, Stella. On release LP830956-1 (1987), Oh Yeah is track #6 at the end of side A, and the rest of the tracks are in the same order. On other US releases it takes place between "Gold Rush" and "Dr. Van Steiner".

== Personnel ==
Yello

- Boris Blank – keyboards, synthesizers, samplers, programming, arranger, lead vocals on "Santiago", backing vocals on "La Habanera", "Call It Love", "The Rhythm Divine", "Goldrush", "Oh Yeah", and "Si Senor the Hairy Grill", spoken word on "Dr Van Steiner"
- Dieter Meier – lead and backing vocals on "La Habanera", "Call It Love", "Goldrush", "Oh Yeah", "Si Senor the Hairy Grill" spoken word on "La Habanera"

Additional personnel

- Beat Ash – drum machine on "Call it Love" "The Rhythm Divine"
- Chico Hablas – guitar on "Moon on Ice", "Call it Love", "Hawaiian Chance", "Goldrush" and "Si Senor the Hairy Grill"
- Philippe Kienholz – electric piano and theme on „Santiago“, accordion on "Le Secret Farida“
- Rush Winters – co-lead vocals on "La Habernera" and "Dr. Van Steiner"
- Billy MacKenzie – backing vocals on "La Habanera", "Moon on Ice", "Call It Love", "The Rhythm Divine", and "Goldrush" lead vocals on "Moon on Ice" and "Santiago", co-lead vocals on "Goldrush"
- Farida – spoken word on "Le Secret Farida"
- Shirley Bassey – lead vocals on "The Rhythm Divine"
- Steve Trop – trombone on "The Rhythm Divine"
- Don Randolph – bass trombone on "The Rhythm Divine"
- Santiago Alfonso – african spoken word on "Santiago"
- Petia Kaufman – glass harp on "Oh Yeah"
- Mick Karn - bass on "The Rhythm Divine" (uncredited)

Production

- Produced by Boris Blank and Yello
- Recorded and engineered by Boris Blank and Yello
- Mixed by Ian Tregoning

== Chart performance ==
Country	Peak position
Australia	95
Austria	6
New Zealand	36
Sweden	24
Switzerland	4
United Kingdom	48
United States	92

Singles – The Official UK Singles Chart / Gallup (United Kingdom)

Date	Single	Chart	Position
August 1986	"Goldrush"	The Official UK Singles Chart	54
August 1987	"The Rhythm Divine"	The Official UK Singles Chart	54

== 2005 remastered issue ==
1. "La Habanera"
2. "Moon on Ice"
3. "Call It Love"
4. "Le Secret Farida"
5. "Hawaiian Chance"
6. "The Rhythm Divine"
7. "Santiago"
8. "Goldrush"
9. "Dr. Van Steiner"
10. "Si Senor the Hairy Grill"
11. "L'Hôtel"
12. "Goldrush II (12" Mix)"
13. "The Rhythm Divine (1992 Version)"
14. "Call It Love (12" Mix)"
15. "Life Is a Snowball"
16. "Tool in Rose"

== Certifications ==
Region	Certification	Certified units/sales
Switzerland (IFPI Switzerland)	Gold	25,000^{^}
^{^} Shipments figures based on certification alone.
