= Goldrush (song) =

Single by Yello

from the album One Second
- B-side: "She's Got a Gun" (live)
- Released: August 1986
- Genre: Synthpop
- Length: 3:48
- Label: Mercury Records, Fontana Records, Vertigo Records
- Songwriter(s): Boris Blank, Dieter Meier
- Producer(s): Yello

Yello singles chronology
"Oh Yeah" (1985)	"Goldrush" (1986)	"Call It Love" (1987)

Music video
- "Goldrush" on YouTube

Goldrush is a song by Swiss electronic band Yello, released in 1986 from the album One Second.

== Track listing ==
7" single

No.	Title	Writer(s)	Length
1.	"Goldrush"	Boris Blank, Dieter Meier	3:48
2.	"She's Got A Gun" (Live at the Palladium, New York)	Boris Blank, Dieter Meier	4:09

12" single

No.	Title	Writer(s)	Length
1.	"Goldrush I"	Boris Blank, Dieter Meier	6:33
2.	"Goldrush II"	Boris Blank, Dieter Meier	6:13
3.	"She's Got A Gun" (Live at the Palladium N.Y.)	Boris Blank, Dieter Meier	4:09

== Charts ==
Chart (1986)	Peak position
Switzerland (Schweizer Hitparade)	9
Germany GfK Entertainment charts	20
UK Singles (OCC)	54
Belgium Ultratop	29
