= Bostich (song) =

Single by Yello

from the album Solid Pleasure
- B-side: "She's Got a Gun"; "Downtown Samba"; "Daily Disco"
- Released: 25 September 1981
- Genre: Synth-pop
- Length: 2:17 (single version); 4:30 (extended version)
- Label: Stiff America, Do It Records, Ralph Records
- Songwriter(s): Boris Blank, Dieter Meier
- Producer(s): Yello

Yello singles chronology
"Night Flanger" (1980)	"Bostich" (1981)	"She's Got a Gun" (1982)

Music video
- "Bostich" on YouTube

"Bostich" is a song by Swiss synthpop band Yello, released in 1981. It is the third and final single to be released from their debut studio album Solid Pleasure. "Bostich" appears on the band's compilation album Essential Yello. The song peaked at number 23 on the Billboard dance chart.

The song's title is a reference to stapler manufacturer Bostitch; in Swiss German, the verb "bostitchen" itself is a generic trademark for stapling.

== Track listing ==
No.	Title	Writer(s)	Length
1.	"Bostich"	Boris Blank, Dieter Meier	4:30
2.	"She's Got A Gun"	B. Blank, D. Meier	3:20
3.	"Downtown Samba"	B. Blank, D. Meier	2:17
4.	"Daily Disco"	B. Blank, D. Meier	4:27

== Personnel ==
Yello

- Electronics, backing vocals – Boris Blank
- Tape – Carlos Peron
- Vocals – Dieter Meier
- Percussion - Beat Ash

Production

- Producer, engineer – Boris Blank, Ursli Weber
