= Flag (Yello album) =

Studio album by Yello
- Released: 31 October 1988
- Recorded: 1987–1988
- Genre: Synth-pop
- Length: 49:01
- Label: Fontana
- Producer: Yello

Yello chronology
One Second (1987)	Flag (1988)	Baby (1991)

Singles from Flag
- 1. "The Race" Released: 11 April 1988; 2. "Tied Up" Released: 28 November 1988; 3. "Of Course I'm Lying" Released: 23 March 1989; 4. "Blazing Saddles" Released: 21 August 1989

Professional ratings
Review scores
Source	Rating
AllMusic	2.5/5 stars

Flag is the sixth studio album by Swiss electronic duo Yello, released in 1988. It features an eight-minute version of "The Race", the edited version of which reached number 7 in the UK Singles Chart in August of that year. "The Race" was used as a trailer for Eurosport, and the opening theme to the US quiz show It's Academic.

An early cut of the album was used as the soundtrack for the film Nuns on the Run and is played during many of the chase scenes.

== Track listing ==
All tracks written by Dieter Meier and Boris Blank.

1. "Tied Up" – 6:05
2. "Of Course I'm Lying" – 5:56
3. "3rd of June" – 4:50
4. "Blazing Saddles" – 3:53
5. "The Race" – 8:08
6. "Alhambra" – 3:38
7. "Otto di Catania" – 3:20
8. "Tied Up in Red" (CD bonus track) – 8:23
9. "Tied Up in Gear" – 3:58
10. "The Race (Break Light Mix)" *
11. "Wall Street Bongo" *
12. "The Race (12″ Mix)" *

(*) Bonus tracks on the 2005 remastered release

== Chart performance ==
Country	Peak position
Switzerland	3
Australia	94
Austria	12
Sweden	24
New Zealand	33
United Kingdom	56
United States	152

Singles – UK Singles Chart / Millward Brown (United Kingdom)

Date	Single	Chart	Position
August 1988	"The Race"	The Official UK Singles Chart	7
December 1988	"Tied Up"	The Official UK Singles Chart	60
March 1989	"Of Course I'm Lying"	The Official UK Singles Chart	23
July 1989	"Blazing Saddles"	The Official UK Singles Chart	47

== Personnel ==
Yello

- Dieter Meier – lyrics, vocals
- Boris Blank – music composition, arrangements, vocals on "Blazing Saddles"

with:

- Billy Mackenzie – backing chorus on "Of Course I'm Lying" and "Otto di Catania"
- Leoš Gerteis – clarinet on "Otto di Catania"
- Chico Hablas – guitars on "Otto di Catania" and "Tied Up in Gear"
- Beat Ash – drums, percussion on 1, 2, 5, 8, 9
- Ernst Gamper – cover

== Production ==
- Arranged, produced, engineered and mixed by Yello
- Mastered by Kevin Metcalfe

== Certifications ==
Region	Certification	Certified units/sales
Austria (IFPI Austria)	Gold	25,000^{*}
Germany (BVMI)	Gold	250,000^{^}
United Kingdom (BPI)	Silver	60,000^{^}
^{*} Sales figures based on certification alone.^{^} Shipments figures based on certification alone.
