= The Rhythm Divine =

Single by Yello and Shirley Bassey

from the album One Second
- B-side: "Dr. Van Steiner"; "Tool In Rose"
- Released: 1987
- Recorded: 1987
- Genre: Pop
- Length: 3.30
- Label: Mercury
- Songwriters: Boris Blank; Dieter Meier; Billy Mackenzie
- Producers: Yello; Hubertus Von Hohenlohe

Shirley Bassey singles chronology
| "There's No Place Like London" (1986) | "The Rhythm Divine" (1987) | "Love Is No Game" (1988) |

The Rhythm Divine
- Alternative European cover

Audio sample
- "The Rhythm Divine": file; help

"The Rhythm Divine" is a song by Swiss electro group Yello, featuring vocals from Shirley Bassey. The song was written by Boris Blank, Dieter Meier and Billy Mackenzie, and appears on the group's fifth studio album One Second (1987).

== Single release ==
The single was released by Yello and Shirley Bassey in 1987, and was the first CD single by Bassey. Dieter Meier approached Bassey in 1987 regarding a possible collaboration. "The Rhythm Divine" was said to have been written specially with her voice in mind. The track was produced by Yello with Hubertus Von Hohenlohe as co-producer. The song appears on the 1987 Yello album One Second, and a remastered and remixed version was released in 1992 on the compilation Essential Yello. This version also appeared in 2003 on the Netherlands album release Het Beste Van Shirley Bassey. In 1989 Yello released a remix medley of several of their songs on the CD single "Of Course I'm Lying", known as the "Metropolitan Mixdown 1989 Part II"; the medley also contains a fragment of "The Rhythm Divine".

Billy MacKenzie, lead singer of The Associates, who had previously worked with Yello on several occasions, provided lyrics and backing vocals. A previously unreleased 12" version of the song, featuring Mackenzie on lead vocals, was issued in 1990 on The Associates compilation Popera.

Bassey's vocals were recorded at Yello's studio in Zurich. The song blends the electro-pop sound of the 1980s with a classic big Bassey ballad and introduced Shirley Bassey to a younger generation. A video featuring both Bassey and Yello was released the Essential Yello compilation in 1992. The song was regularly performed live by Bassey in the following year, albeit with a different orchestral arrangement.

The single was also released in the US and Canada on the Polygram Vertigo label, on a double 12" single, which included the 12" version.

== Chart performance ==
| Country | Peak position |
|---|---|
| Austria | 19 |
| Switzerland | 21 |
| Netherlands | 24 |
| Poland | 26 |
| Germany | 47 |
| United Kingdom | 54 |

== Track listing ==
UK 7" single

Issued on Some Bizzare Label Mer 253 and European 7" single Mercury 888 746-7

- A: "The Rhythm Divine" (single version) - 3.30
- B: "Dr. Van Steiner" (Boris Blank) (Instrumental) - 3.55

UK 12" single

Issued on Some Bizzare Label (Mercury Merx 2531987).

- A: "The Rhythm Divine" (Version Two) (featuring Billy Mckenzie on vocals)
- B1: "Dr. Van Steiner" (Boris Blank) (Instrumental)
- B2: "The Rhythm Divine" (Original 7" version) (Boris Blank)

European 12" single

Issued on Mercury 888 746-12 (1987).

- A: "The Rhythm Divine" (12" version) - 5.05 (featuring Shirley Bassey on vocals)
- B1: "Dr. Van Steiner" (Boris Blank) (Instrumental) - 3.55
- B2: "Tool In Rose" (Boris Blank) - 5.38

European CD single

Issued on Mercury 888 746-2

1. "The Rhythm Divine" (12" version) - 5.05
2. "Dr. Van Steiner" (Boris Blank) (Instrumental) - 3.55
3. "Tool In Rose" (Boris Blank) - 5.38
