= The Eye (Yello album) =

Studio album by Yello
- Released: December 9, 2003
- Recorded: 2003
- Genre: Electronica
- Length: 55:58
- Label: Motor
- Producer: Yello; Håkan Lidbo

Yello chronology
Motion Picture (1999)	The Eye (2003)	Progress and Perfection (2007)

Singles from The Eye
- 1. "Planet Dada" Released: 20 October 2003

Professional ratings
Review scores
Source	Rating
AllMusic	2/5 stars
Uncut	1/5 stars

The Eye is the eleventh studio album by the Swiss electronic duo Yello. It was released on 9 December 2003 through Motor Music. The album peaked at number 16 in Switzerland and number 20 in Germany.

== Track listing ==
All lyrics are written by Dieter Meier.

No.	Title	Producer(s)	Length
1.	"Planet Dada"	Yello; Håkan Lidbo	3:08
2.	"Nervous"	Yello	2:53
3.	"Don Turbulento"	Yello; Hubertus von Hohenlohe (co.)	4:51
4.	"Soul on Ice"	Yello	3:12
5.	"Junior B"	Yello; Hubertus von Hohenlohe (co.)	4:05
6.	"Tiger Dust"	Yello	5:00
7.	"Distant Solution"	Yello; Hubertus von Hohenlohe (co.)	4:43
8.	"Hipster's Delay"	Yello	4:38
9.	"Time Palace"	Yello; Hubertus von Hohenlohe (co.)	4:19
10.	"Indigo Bay"	Yello	5:50
11.	"Unreal"	Yello; Hubertus von Hohenlohe (co.)	4:02
12.	"Bougainville"	Yello	3:55
13.	"Star Breath"	Yello	5:18
14.	"Planet Dada (Flamboyant)"	Yello	4:40
Total length:			55:58

== Personnel ==
- Yello – producers
  - Dieter Meier – lyrics, vocals
  - Boris Blank – composer, arranger, engineering, remixing (track 13)
- Jade Davies – vocals (tracks: 3, 5, 7, 9, 11)
- Pogo – additional bass (track 5)
- Nils Johan Håkan Lidbo – producer (track 1)
- Hubertus von Hohenlohe – vocal co-producer (tracks: 3, 5, 7, 9, 11)
- Ian "Pooley" Pinnekamp – mixing (tracks: 3, 7)
- Marc "Akufen" Leclair – re-mixing (track 14)
- Christoph Stickel – mastering
- Martin Wanner – cover design
- Beat Pfändler – photography

== Charts ==
Chart (2003)	Peak position
German Albums (Offizielle Top 100)	20
Swiss Albums (Schweizer Hitparade)	16
