= Claro Que Si =

Studio album by Yello
- Released: 1981
- Recorded: 1981
- Studios: Yello Studio, Zürich; Powerplay Studio, Maur, Switzerland
- Genre: Synth-pop
- Length: 37:54
- Labels: Ralph (original US release), Mercury (1985 US reissue), Do It (original UK release), Vertigo (1984 European release)
- Producers: Boris Blank, Ursli Weber

Yello chronology
Solid Pleasure (1980)	Claro Que Si (1981)	You Gotta Say Yes to Another Excess (1983)

Singles from 1982
- 1. "She's Got a Gun" Released: January 1982 (UK & FR); 2. "Pinball Cha Cha" Released: 28 May 1982 (UK & GER)

Professional ratings
Review scores
Source	Rating
AllMusic	3/5 stars
Sputnikmusic	3.4/5

Claro Que Si is Yello's second album, released in 1981. "Claro que si" is Spanish for "Yes of course" and was reissued in 2005 in part of Yello Remaster Series with rare bonus tracks.

== Track listing ==
All tracks are written by Boris Blank and Dieter Meier.

No.	Title	Length
1.	"Daily Disco"	4:32
2.	"No More Roger"	3:18
3.	"Take It All"	1:48
4.	"The Evening's Young"	4:53
5.	"She's Got a Gun"	3:40
6.	"Ballet Mecanique"	3:44
7.	"Ouad el Habib"	3:24
8.	"The Lorry"	3:35
9.	"Homer Hossa"	5:16
10.	"Pinball Cha Cha"	3:40
Total length:		37:54

2005 reissue bonus tracks
No.	Title	Length
11.	"Tub Dub"	1:45
12.	"She's Got a Gun" (live at the Palladium, New York City, September 1985)	4:01
13.	"Daily Disco" (1985 version)	4:05
14.	"The Evening's Young" (1985 version)	3:11
15.	"Pinball Cha Cha" (12" mix)	5:22
16.	"Desire for Desire"	4:16

== Personnel ==
Yello

- Boris Blank – electronics, backing vocals
- Dieter Meier – vocals
- Carlos Perón – tapes

Additional personnel

- Beat Ash – drums
- Chico Hablas – guitars
- Zine el Abedine – vocals on "Ouad el Habib"

Cover Design / Illustration

- Jim Cherry
