= You Gotta Say Yes to Another Excess =

Studio album by Yello
- Released: June 1983
- Recorded: 1983
- Genre: Synth-pop
- Length: 37:35
- Labels: Elektra (original US release); Mercury (1988 US reissue); Stiff (original UK release); Polydor (original French release); Vertigo (Europe)
- Producers: Yello, Ursli Weber

Yello chronology
Claro Que Si (1981)	You Gotta Say Yes to Another Excess (1983)	Stella (1985)

Singles from You Gotta Say Yes to Another Excess
- 1. "You Gotta Say Yes to Another Excess" Released: 22 October 1982; 2. "I Love You" Released: 30 May 1983; 3. "Heavy Whispers" Released: 1983; 4. "Lost Again" Released: 18 October 1983; 5. "Pumping Velvet" Released: 22 October 1983

Professional ratings
Review scores
Source	Rating
AllMusic	4/5 stars

You Gotta Say Yes to Another Excess is the third studio album by Swiss electronic band Yello, released in June 1983. It was the last Yello album to feature founding member Carlos Perón. It charted in several countries across Europe, and also peaked at No. 184 on the U.S. Billboard 200.

== Track listing ==
All tracks are written by Boris Blank and Dieter Meier.

No.	Title	Length
1.	"I Love You"	3:14
2.	"Lost Again"	4:18
3.	"No More Words"	3:58
4.	"Crash Dance"	2:08
5.	"Great Mission"	2:56
6.	"You Gotta Say Yes to Another Excess"	2:08
7.	"Swing"	3:26
8.	"Heavy Whispers"	3:56
9.	"Smile on You"	3:09
10.	"Pumping Velvet"	3:18
11.	"Salut Mayoumba"	4:40
12.	"Two Worlds" (bonus track on some cassette releases)	4:12
Total length:		37:35

2005 reissue bonus tracks
No.	Title	Length
12.	"Base for Alec"	2:54
13.	"Rubber West"	3:26
14.	"You Gotta Say Yes to Another Excess" (UK promo 12" version)	4:44
15.	"Live at the Roxy NY Dec. 1983"	3:41
16.	"Pumping Velvet (12" mix)"	4:58
17.	"I Love You (12" mix)"	5:14

== Charts ==
Chart (1983)	Peak position
Switzerland Swiss Hitparade	13
Germany GfK Entertainment charts	26
Netherlands Dutch Charts	36
Swedish Sverigetopplistan	44
United Kingdom UK Albums Chart	65

Singles – UK Singles Chart / Gallup (United Kingdom)

Year	Single	Chart	Position
June 1983	"I Love You"	UK Singles Chart	41
November 1983	"Lost Again"	UK Singles Chart	73

== Critical reception ==
It was ranked at number 6 among the "Albums of the Year" for 1983 by NME, and the single "I Love You" was ranked at number 17 among "Tracks of the Year".

== Other ==
In 2006, South African ceramicist Elton Harding translated the opening track "I Love You" into a ceramic tactile sculpture. The entire song was mapped out onto a rectangular spiral, with each second of the track taking up 1 cm. Samples were then represented by unique shapes allowing for the song to be 'read' either by sight or touch.
