= I Love You (Yello song) =

Single by Yello

from the album You Gotta Say Yes to Another Excess
- B-side: "Rubber West"
- Released: 1983
- Genre: Synth-pop; electronic
- Length: 3:11
- Label: Stiff; Electra; Vertigo
- Songwriters: Boris Blank; Dieter Meier
- Producers: Yello; Ursli Weber

Yello singles chronology
"You Gotta Say Yes to Another Excess" (1983)	"I Love You" (1983)	"Heavy Whispers" (1983)

Music video
- "I Love You" on YouTube

"I Love You" is a 1983 song by Swiss electronic music band Yello from their third studio album You Gotta Say Yes to Another Excess. The song reached No. 41 on the UK singles chart and No. 16 on the U.S. Billboard Dance Club Songs chart. The song was also accompanied by a music video which was directed by Dieter Meier. AllMusic's John Bush stated the song has "deep-throated vocals".
