= Pocket Universe (disambiguation) =

A pocket universe is a concept in inflationary theory.

Pocket Universe may also refer to:

- Pocket Universe, an album by Yello
- Pocket Universe (DC Comics), a location in DC Comics stories featuring the Legion of Super-Heroes and Superman
