= Rubber Band Man (disambiguation) =

Rubber Band Man is a 2003 song by American rapper T.I.

Rubber Band Man may also refer to:

- "The Rubberband Man", a 1976 song by American vocal group the Spinners
- "Rubberbandman", a song from the 1991 album Baby by Yello
- "Rubber Band Man" (ASAP Ferg song), a song from the 2017 ASAP Ferg album Still Striving
- Rubber-Band Man, a character from the superhero television series Static Shock
- "Rubber Band Man", a 2025 song by Mumford & Sons and Hozier
