= Toy (Yello album) =

Studio album by Yello
- Released: 30 September 2016
- Genre: EDM
- Length: 61:04
- Label: Universal
- Producer: Yello

Yello chronology
The Key to Perfection (2012)	Toy (2016)	Point (2020)

Singles from Toy
- 1. "Limbo" Released: 22 July 2016; 2. "Tool of Love" Released: 12 August 2016; 3. "Blue Biscuit" Released: 16 September 2016

Professional ratings
Aggregate scores
Source	Rating
Metacritic	74/100
Review scores
Source	Rating
AllMusic	3.5/5 stars
The Guardian	3.0/5 stars
The Independent	4/5 stars
The Line of Best Fit	7.5/10
Mixmag	8/10
Mojo	4/5 stars
MusicOMH	3.5/5 stars
Q	3/5 stars
Record Collector	3/5 stars
The Times	4.0/5 stars

Toy is the thirteenth studio album by the Swiss electronic duo Yello. It was released on 30 September 2016 on Universal Music.

In order to promote the album, Yello performed four sold-out shows at Berlin's Kraftwerk during the last week of October 2016, their first live shows ever.

== Reception ==
A reviewer of Mixmag stated, "On this showing, they’re just as weird and just as wonderful as ever. The first thing that’s noticeable is just how inventive Blank’s synth work still is: whether for floating sunrise ballads, darkly rippling ambient pieces or pumping glam-pop, his sounds bubble and blurt in super surprising ways." Ben Hogwood of musicOMH wrote, " Their latest return from the wilderness feels as though in the wake of a long absence, but in reality the duo have kept at close quarters, plotting their next album even while pursuing solo ventures. And here it is, the brightly coloured Toy – where after a brief intro we alight on planet Yello with some vintage Meier vocals, given from the soles of his boots." A review by the Record Collector commented, "Dieter Meier’s vocals are a little grizzled but retain their dark chocolate vibes. He’s the bohemian who’s seen it all but can’t stop partying, reflecting this in the lyrics. He does however need a few disco naps, these being filled adequately by party guests." Chris Todd of The Line of Best Fit noted, "It all results in their strongest album for over two decades... they're one of those acts who, despite sounding the same throughout their career, have managed to avoid ever sound boring."

== Track listing ==
=== Standard edition ===
No.	Title	Writer(s)	Length
1.	"Frautonium Intro"	Boris Blank, Dieter Meier	1:10
2.	"Limbo"	Blank, Meier	3:23
3.	"30'000 Days"	Blank, Meier	4:05
4.	"Cold Flame" (featuring Malia)	Blank, Malia, Meier	4:02
5.	"Kiss the Cloud" (featuring Fifi Rong)	Blank, Meier, Fifi Rong	3:14
6.	"Pacific AM"	Blank, Meier	3:23
7.	"Starlight Scene"	Blank, Malia, Meier	3:17
8.	"Give You the World" (featuring Malia)	Blank, Malia, Meier	3:32
9.	"Tool of Love"	Blank, Meier	3:12
10.	"Dialectical Kid"	Blank, Heidi Happy, Meier	3:18
11.	"Dark Side"	Blank, Meier, Rong	4:15
12.	"Blue Biscuit"	Blank, Meier	3:36
13.	"Magma"	Blank, Meier	6:27
14.	"Frautonium"	Blank, Meier	4:21

=== Deluxe edition ===
Deluxe edition
No.	Title	Writer(s)	Length
1.	"Frautonium Intro"	Blank, Meier	1:09
2.	"Limbo"	Blank, Meier	3:22
3.	"30'000 Days"	Blank, Meier	4:05
4.	"Electrified II"	Blank, Malia, Meier	2:49
5.	"Cold Flame" (featuring Malia)	Blank, Malia, Meier	4:02
6.	"Kiss the Cloud" (featuring Fifi Rong)	Blank, Meier, Rong	3:13
7.	"Starlight Scene"	Blank, Malia, Meier	3:16
8.	"Tool of Love"	Blank, Meier	3:12
9.	"Give You the World" (featuring Malia)	Blank, Malia, Meier	3:32
10.	"Dialectical Kid"	Blank, Heidi Happy, Meier	3:18
11.	"Dark Side"	Blank, Meier, Rong	4:15
12.	"Pacific AM"	Blank, Meier	3:22
13.	"Blue Biscuit"	Blank, Meier	3:35
14.	"Lost in Motion" (featuring Fifi Rong)	Blank, Meier, Rong	3:32
15.	"Magma"	Blank, Meier	6:26
16.	"Toy Square"	Blank, Meier	3:08
17.	"Frautonium"	Blank, Meier	4:20

== Personnel ==
Band

- Jeremy Baer – guitar
- Boris Blank – vocals
- Heidi Happy – vocals
- Malia – vocals
- Dieter Meier – vocals
- Fifi Rong – vocals

Production

- Helen Sobiralski – photography
- Martin Wanner – photography
- Ursli Webser – mastering

== Charts ==
=== Weekly charts ===
Chart (2016)	Peak position
Austrian Albums (Ö3 Austria)	16
Belgian Albums (Ultratop Flanders)	80
Belgian Albums (Ultratop Wallonia)	82
Dutch Albums (Album Top 100)	48
German Albums (Offizielle Top 100)	2
Hungarian Albums (MAHASZ)	13
Scottish Albums (Official Charts)	75
Swedish Albums (Sverigetopplistan)	55
Swiss Albums (Schweizer Hitparade)	1
UK Albums (Official Charts)	84

=== Year-end charts ===
Chart (2016)	Position
Swiss Albums (Schweizer Hitparade)	59
