= Love Is No Game =

Single by Shirley Bassey
- Released: 1988
- Recorded: 1984
- Genre: Pop
- Length: 3.59
- Label: Indisc
- Songwriter(s): Pino Marchese, Charles McLoughlin

Shirley Bassey singles chronology
"The Rhythm Divine" (1987)	"Love Is No Game" (1988)	"Sin Ti" (1989)

Love Is No Game is a single released by Shirley Bassey in 1988. Composed by Pino Marchese, Charles McLoughlin who later worked together on the film soundtrack of the French movie Parole de Flic. The same team had previously provided the 1983 European hit "Thought I'd Ring You" (duet with Alain Delon), which charted at #13 in the Dutch charts. The song is a remix of a song that was previously released in 1984, then known as "That's Right". The single was released in the wake of the recent hit single "The Rhythm Divine" a collaboration with the electro-pop group Yello, which revived Bassey's career and chart success in otherwise a rather barren period in her recording career and introduced her to a whole new generation. The song has never been included on a Shirley Bassey album or compilation. The 7" single release features. on the b-side, the original Shirley Bassey recording of "Memory", 'from the musical Cats recorded in 1984. She went on to re-record the song in 1993 for the album Sings the Songs of Andrew Lloyd Webber. Shirley Bassey did not promote this single and no video was released. The single was only released in the Netherlands, Belgium and Germany where it failed to chart.

== Track listing ==
Benelux 7" single Issued on Indisc DICD 127891 and German 7" single on Koch Records 145.585 AS

A:"Love Is No Game" (single version) - 3.59

B: "Memory" (Andrew Lloyd Webber, Trevor Nunn, based on work from T.S. Eliot) -3.34 (Previously released in 1984)

Benelux CD single Issued on Indisc DICD 127891 and German CD single on Koch Records 350 043 B3

1. "Love Is No Game" (long version) - 5.14
2. "Love Is No Game" (single version) - 3.59
