= Point (Yello album) =

Studio album by Yello
- Released: 4 September 2020
- Genre: EDM
- Length: 39:26
- Label: Universal
- Producer: Yello

Yello chronology
| Toy (2016) | Point (2020) | Time Lab (2026) |

Professional ratings
Review scores
| Source | Rating |
|---|---|
| The Arts Desk | 5/5 stars |
| Laut.de | 4/5 stars |
| Mojo | 4/5 stars |
| MusicOMH | 4/5 stars |
| Q | 4/5 stars |

Point is the fourteenth studio album by the Swiss electronic duo Yello. It was released on 4 September 2020 on Universal Music.

== Reception ==
Joe Muggs of The Arts Desk wrote, "And so, another Yello album, and yes, it sounds like classic Yello. Maier’s vocals were always predicated on an eerie inhumanity – electronic cut-ups and processing making him infernally robotic, a kind of ludic counterpoint to fellow synthpop pioneers Kraftwerk’s deadpanning." Ben Hogwood of musicOMH commented, "Pop music is supposed to be fun. That was the immediate reaction on listening to Point, the 14th album from Swiss electronic music pioneers Yello. The two – Dieter Meier and Boris Blank – could never be accused of taking themselves too seriously, and it is a pleasure to report nothing has changed."

== Track listing ==
All tracks are written by Boris Blank, lyrics by Dieter Meier.

| No. | Title | Length |
|---|---|---|
| 1. | "Waba Duba" | 3:07 |
| 2. | "The Vanishing of Peter Strong" | 3:22 |
| 3. | "Way Down" | 3:19 |
| 4. | "Out of Sight" | 3:03 |
| 5. | "Arthur Spark" | 3:35 |
| 6. | "Big Boy's Blues" | 3:27 |
| 7. | "Basic Avenue" | 2:55 |
| 8. | "Core Shift" | 3:00 |
| 9. | "Spinning My Mind" | 3:19 |
| 10. | "Hot Pan" | 3:17 |
| 11. | "Rush for Joe" | 3:25 |
| 12. | "Siren Singing" (featuring Fifi Rong) | 3:43 |
| Total length: | | 39:26 |

Dolby Atmos Edition bonus tracks
| No. | Title | Length |
|---|---|---|
| 13. | "Insane" | 3:49 |
| 14. | "Zephyr Calling" | 3:16 |
| 15. | "Meet My Angel" (featuring Fifi Rong) | 3:48 |
| Total length: | | 50:19 |

== Personnel ==
- Jeremy Baer – guitar
- Boris Blank – vocals
- Dieter Meier – vocals

== Charts ==
| Chart (2020) | Peak position |
|---|---|
| Austrian Albums (Ö3 Austria) | 5 |
| Dutch Albums (Album Top 100) | 73 |
| German Albums (Offizielle Top 100) | 6 |
| Swiss Albums (Schweizer Hitparade) | 1 |
