= Touch Yello =

Studio album by Yello
- Released: 2 October 2009
- Genre: Electronica
- Length: 54:39
- Label: Polydor 0602527194851
- Producer: Yello

Yello chronology
Progress and Perfection (2007)	Touch Yello (2009)	Yello by Yello (2010)

Singles from Touch Yello
- 1. "Part Love" Released: September 2009

Professional ratings
Review scores
Source	Rating
AllMusic	3/5 stars
Laut.de	4/5 stars

Touch Yello is the 12th studio album by Swiss electronic band Yello. The record was released on October 2, 2009, through Polydor Records label.

== Track listing ==
All music is composed by Boris Blank.

No.	Title	Lyrics	Length
1.	"The Expert"	Dieter Meier	2:55
2.	"You Better Hide (feat. Heidi Happy)"	Heidi Happy	4:15
3.	"Out of Dawn"	Dieter Meier	3:13
4.	"Bostich (Reflected)"	Dieter Meier	3:57
5.	"Till Tomorrow (feat. Till Brönner)"		4:17
6.	"Tangier Blue"	Boris Blank	2:42
7.	"Part Love"	Dieter Meier	3:42
8.	"Friday Smile"	Dieter Meier	3:36
9.	"Kiss in Blue (feat. Heidi Happy)"	Boris Blank, Heidi Happy	3:34
10.	"Vertical Vision (feat. Till Brönner)"		4:18
11.	"Trackless Deep"	Boris Blank	3:20
12.	"Stay (feat. Heidi Happy)"	Heidi Happy	3:02
13.	"Electric Frame (feat. Till Brönner)"		3:36
14.	"Takla Makan (feat. Dorothee Oberlinger)"		8:33
Total length:			54:39

== Track listing: Re-released on 2009, December 4, with 6 bonus tracks + the DVD The Virtual Concert ==
All music is composed by Boris Blank.

No.	Title	Lyrics	Length
1.	"The Expert"	Dieter Meier	2:55
2.	"You Better Hide (feat. Heidi Happy)"	Heidi Happy	4:15
3.	"Out of Dawn"	Dieter Meier	3:13
4.	"Bostich (Reflected)"	Dieter Meier	3:57
5.	"Till Tomorrow (feat. Till Brönner)"		4:17
6.	"Tangier Blue"	Boris Blank	2:42
7.	"Part Love"	Dieter Meier	3:42
8.	"Friday Smile"	Dieter Meier	3:36
9.	"Kiss in Blue (feat. Heidi Happy)"	Boris Blank, Heidi Happy	3:34
10.	"Vertical Vision (feat. Till Brönner)"		4:18
11.	"Trackless Deep"	Boris Blank	3:20
12.	"Stay (feat. Heidi Happy)"	Heidi Happy	3:02
13.	"Electric Frame (feat. Till Brönner)"		3:36
14.	"Takla Makan (feat. Dorothee Oberlinger)"		8:33
15.	"X-Race"		4:12
16.	"Petro Oleum"		3:03
17.	"Oh Yeah 2009"		2:27
18.	"Umbria"		2:35
19.	"Bostich (Duck Mobile)"		3:20
20.	"Scorpio Rising"		4:32

== Personnel ==
- Composed, Arranged, Engineered by Boris Blank
- Lyrics by Dieter Meier
- Vocals, Composed [Vocal Melodies] by Boris Blank, Dieter Meier
- Mastered by Ursli Weber
- Photography by Dieter Meier, Johannes Ritter, Martin Wanner, Roman Lehmann
- Design [Cover] by Martin Wanner
- Producer – Yello

℗ & © 2009 Yello, under exclusive license to Universal Music Domestic Pop, a division of Universal Music GmbH.

== Charts ==
2009 chart performance for Touch Yello
Chart (2009)	Peak position
Austrian Albums (Ö3 Austria)	35
Belgian Albums (Ultratop Wallonia)	67
German Albums (Offizielle Top 100)	20
Hungarian Albums (MAHASZ)	40
Swiss Albums (Schweizer Hitparade)	1

2025 chart performance for Touch Yello
Chart (2025)	Peak position
German Albums (Offizielle Top 100)	4

== Certifications ==
Region	Certification	Certified units/sales
Switzerland (IFPI Switzerland)	Gold	15,000^{^}
^{^} Shipments figures based on certification alone.
