= Essential Yello =

Compilation album by Yello
- Released: 1992
- Recorded: 1980–1992
- Genre: Synth-pop
- Length: 62:31
- Labels: Mercury (original release), Vertigo (Canada), Smash (1993 US reissue)
- Producer: Boris Blank

Yello chronology
Baby (1991)	Essential Yello (1992)	Zebra (1994)

Professional ratings
Review scores
Source	Rating
AllMusic	4.5/5 stars

Essential Yello, or simply Essential is a compilation album by Swiss electronic duo Yello. It was first released in 1992 and also available as a sell-through video release (on VHS and later on DVD).

== Track listing ==
1. "Oh Yeah" – 3:05
2. "The Race" – 3:15
3. "Drive/Driven" – 4:11
4. "Rubberbandman" – 3:35
5. "Vicious Games" – 4:19
6. "Tied Up" – 3:32
7. "Lost Again" – 4:19
8. "I Love You" – 4:05
9. "Of Course I'm Lying" – 3:50
10. "Pinball Cha Cha" – 3:33
11. "Bostich" – 4:35
12. "Desire" – 3:40
13. "Jungle Bill" – 3:35
14. "Call It Love" – 4:05
15. "Goldrush" – 4:20
16. "The Rhythm Divine" (featuring Shirley Bassey) – 4:20
- An edition with "Tremendous Pain" and "Jingle Bells" as bonus tracks also exists.
- In its video releases (both VHS and DVD) the song "Drive/Driven" is replaced by the video "Who's Gone?" (from their 1991 Baby album).

== Charts ==
Chart (1992)	Peak position
Australian Albums (ARIA Charts)	148

== Certifications ==
Region	Certification	Certified units/sales
Norway (IFPI Norway)	Gold	25,000^{*}
^{*} Sales figures based on certification alone.
