= Motion Picture (album) =

Studio album by Yello
- Released: December 14, 1999
- Recorded: 1999
- Genre: Electronica
- Length: 53:30
- Label: Mercury
- Producer: Yello

Yello chronology
Pocket Universe (1997)	Motion Picture (1999)	The Eye (2003)

Singles from Motion Picture
- 1. "Squeeze Please" Released: 1 November 1999

Professional ratings
Review scores
Source	Rating
AllMusic	3/5 stars

Motion Picture is the tenth studio album by Swiss electronic duo Yello. It was released on 14 December 1999 via Mercury Records. The album peaked at number 13 in Switzerland, number 21 in Norway and number 23 in Germany.

== Track listing ==
No.	Title	Length
1.	"Get On"	4:28
2.	"Houdini"	4:12
3.	"Prisoner of His Mind"	4:08
4.	"Distant Mirror"	5:17
5.	"Time Freeze"	5:06
6.	"Croissant Bleu"	3:24
7.	"Liquid Lies"	3:16
8.	"Squeeze Please"	3:14
9.	"Shake and Shiver"	4:31
10.	"Bubbling Under"	5:15
11.	"Point Blank"	6:12
12.	"Cyclops"	4:27
Total length:		53:30

== Personnel ==
- Boris Blank — producer, composer, arrangement, engineering
- Dieter Meier — lyrics, vocals, producer
- Gino Todesco — Rhodes electric piano (tracks: 5, 11)
- Kevin Metcalfe — mastering
- Martin Wanner — photography

== Charts ==
Chart (1999)	Peak position
German Albums (Offizielle Top 100)	23
Norwegian Albums (VG-lista)	21
Swiss Albums (Schweizer Hitparade)	13
