= Zebra (Yello album) =

Studio album by Yello
- Released: 17 October 1994
- Recorded: 1993–1994
- Genre: Electronica
- Length: 45:53
- Label: Mercury
- Producer: Yello

Yello chronology
Essential Yello (1992)	Zebra (1994)	Hands on Yello (1995)

Singles from Zebra
- 1. "Do It" Released: 25 April 1994; 2. "How How" Released: 16 September 1994; 3. "Tremendous Pain" Released: 29 May 1995

Professional ratings
Review scores
Source	Rating
AllMusic	2/5 stars
NME	6/10

Zebra is the eighth studio album by the electronica Swiss band Yello. The record was released on 17 October 1994 through 4th & B'way and Mercury labels.

== Track listing ==
=== CD edition ===
All songs by Blank/Meier.

1. "Suite 909" – 6:16
2. "How How" – 2:39
3. "Night Train" – 3:36
4. "Do It" – 3:08
5. "I … I'm in Love" – 3:28
6. "S.A.X." – 3:12
7. "Fat Cry" – 4:11
8. "Tremendous Pain" – 3:58
9. "Move Dance Be Born" – 6:03
10. "The Premix" – 5:54
11. "Poom Shanka" – 3:28

=== Vinyl edition ===
All songs by Blank/Meier.

Side 1

1. "Suite 909" – 6:16
2. "How How" – 2:39
3. "Night Train" – 3:36
4. "I … I'm in Love" – 3:28
5. "S.A.X." – 3:12
6. "Fat Cry" – 4:11

Side 2

1. "Tremendous Pain" – 3:58
2. "Do It" – 3:08
3. "Move Dance Be Born" – 6:03
4. "The Premix" – 5:54
5. "Poom Shanka" – 3:28

== Personnel ==
Yello

- Boris Blank – background vocals, arranger, engineer
- Dieter Meier – lyricist, vocals

with:

- Ian Shaw – background vocals
- Marco Colombo – guitar
- Rene Chico Hablas – guitar
- Kevin Metcalfe – mastering
- LWS – illustrations

== Charts ==
Chart (1994/5)	Peak position
Australian Albums (ARIA Charts)	197
Hungarian Albums (MAHASZ)	39

== Certifications ==
Region	Certification	Certified units/sales
Switzerland (IFPI Switzerland)	Gold	25,000^{^}
^{^} Shipments figures based on certification alone.
