= Hands on Yello =

Hands On Yello

Remix album by Yello
- Released: 20 March 1995
- Genre: Electronica
- Length: 68:01
- Label: Urban/Motor Music
- Producer: Yello

Yello chronology
| Zebra (1994) | Hands On Yello (1995) | Pocket Universe (1997) |

Professional ratings
Review scores
| Source | Rating |
|---|---|
| AllMusic | 3/5 stars |

Hands on Yello is a remix album by Swiss electronica band Yello, released in 1995.

== Track listings ==
=== Hands on Yello ===
The initial version was released on 20 March 1995, as single CD, double LP or single cassette.

All tracks are written by Blank/Meier.

| No. | Title | Remixer(s) | Length |
|---|---|---|---|
| 1. | "Dr. Van Steiner" | Cosmic Baby (& Jens Wojnar) | 5:40 |
| 2. | "Bostich" | Klaus Jankuhn & WestBam | 3:06 |
| 3. | "Ciel ouvert" | Jens | 5:17 |
| 4. | "You Gotta Say Yes to Another Excess – Great Mission" | Jam & Spoon | 3:58 |
| 5. | "Crash Dance" | Oliver Lieb | 5:50 |
| 6. | "Vicious Games (12" Edit)" | The Grid | 4:44 |
| 7. | "Oh Yeah" | Plutone | 5:38 |
| 8. | "Live at the Roxy" | Ilsa Gold | 5:00 |
| 9. | "I Love You" | Hardsequencer | 5:34 |
| 10. | "L'Hotel" | Carl Cox | 5:04 |
| 11. | "La habanera" | Carl Craig | 5:50 |
| 12. | "Excess" | The Orb | 5:39 |
| 13. | "Lost Again" | Moby | 6:04 |

=== Hands on Yello – The Updates ===
"The Updates" were released on 26 June 1995 as a limited double CD.

All tracks are written by Blank/Meier.

CD1
| No. | Title | Remixer(s) | Length |
|---|---|---|---|
| 1. | "Live at the Roxy" | Ilsa Gold | 7:23 |
| 2. | "Bostich (Machine Mix)" | Klaus Jankuhn & WestBam | 6:33 |
| 3. | "L'hotel (Long Version)" | Carl Cox | 7:31 |
| 4. | "You Gotta Say Yes to Another Excess – Great Mission (Uff die 12-Mix)" | Jam & Spoon | 10:55 |
| 5. | "Crash Dance" | Oliver Lieb | 5:53 |
| 6. | "I Love You" | Hardsequencer | 5:35 |
| 7. | "Desire (V2)" | Oliver Lieb | 9:05 |
| 8. | "Oh Yeah" | Plutone | 4:25 |

CD2
| No. | Title | Remixer(s) | Length |
|---|---|---|---|
| 1. | "Dr. Van Steiner" | Cosmic Baby (& Jens Wojnar) | 5:44 |
| 2. | "Ciel ouvert" | Jens Mahlstedt & Gerret Frerichs | 7:44 |
| 3. | "La habanera" | Carl Craig | 5:47 |
| 4. | "Vicious Games (Ambient Mix)" | The Grid | 4:34 |
| 5. | "Lost Again" | Moby | 6:05 |
| 6. | "You Gotta Say Yes to Another Excess (Long Version)" | The Orb | 12:59 |
| Total length: | | | 1:40:19 |

Compared to the initial release, The Updates contains an extra remix by Oliver Lieb, different remixes by The Grid and Plutone, and longer versions of the remixes by Westbam, Jens, Jam & Spoon, Ilsa Gold, Carl Cox and The Orb.

=== Hands on Yello (vinyl box set) ===
Box with six 12" vinyls, two slipmats and a booklet, limited to 1000 numbered copies. Contains the exclusive "Instrumental Acid" remix of "Vicious Games" by The Grid.

| Side | Title | Remixer(s) | Length |
|---|---|---|---|
| A | "Dr. Van Steiner" | Cosmic Baby (& Jens Wojnar) | 5:40 |
| B | "You Gotta Say Yes to Another Excess (Long Version)" | The Orb | 12:58 |
| C | "Bostich (Machine Mix)" | Klaus Jankuhn & WestBam | 6:34 |
| D | "Bostich (Rush Push Mix)" | Klaus Jankuhn & WestBam | 5:04 |
| E | "You Gotta Say Yes to Another Excess – Great Mission (Uff die 12-Mix)" | Jam & Spoon | 10:55 |
| F | "You Gotta Say Yes to Another Excess – Great Mission (Hausmix)" | Jam & Spoon | 7:40 |
| G1 | "Ciel ouvert" | Jens (Jens Mahlstedt & Gerret Frerichs) | 7:55 |
| G2 | "Lost Again" | Moby | 6:00 |
| H1 | "Live at the Roxy" | Ilsa Gold | 7:20 |
| H2 | "I Love You" | Hardsequencer | 5:34 |
| I | "L'hotel" | Carl Cox | 7:33 |
| J1 | "Oh Yeah" | Plutone | 6:00 |
| J2 | "La habanera" | Carl Craig | 5:50 |
| K | "Crash Dance" | Oliver Lieb | 5:53 |
| L1 | "Desire" | Oliver Lieb | 9:03 |
| L2 | "Vicious Games (Instrumental Acid)" | The Grid | 8:15 |

== Singles ==
=== Westbam's Hands on Yello "Bostich" ===

| No. | Title | Appears on | Length |
|---|---|---|---|
| 1. | "Bostich (Machine Mix)" | 12"/CD-single | 6:34 |
| 2. | "Bostich (Rush Push Mix)" | 12"/CD-single | 5:08 |
| 3. | "Bostich (Video Cut)" | CD-single | 3:06 |

Remixed by Klaus Jankuhn & WestBam.
The "Video Cut" is a shorter version of the "Machine Mix".

=== Jam & Spoon's Hands on Yello "You Gotta Say Yes to Another Excess – Great Mission" ===

| No. | Title | Appears on | Length |
|---|---|---|---|
| 1. | "You Gotta Say Yes to Another Excess – Great Mission (Uff die 12-mix)" | 12"/CD-single | 10:54 |
| 2. | "You Gotta Say Yes to Another Excess – Great Mission (Haus Mix)" | 12"/CD-single | 7:21 |
| 3. | "You Gotta Say Yes to Another Excess – Great Mission" | CD-single | 3:57 |

Remixed by Jam El Mar & Mark Spoon.
Track 3 is a shorter version of track 1, the "Uff die 12-mix".

=== Plutone's Hands on Yello "Oh Yeah" ===

| No. | Title | Appears on | Length |
|---|---|---|---|
| 1. | "Oh Yeah (Video Edit)" | CD-single | 3:34 |
| 2. | "Oh Yeah (Experimental Mix)" | 12"/CD-single | 5:14 |
| 3. | "Oh Yeah (Plutone Remix)" | 12"/CD-single | 6:12 |
| 4. | "Oh Yeah (Sun + Moon Mix)" | 12"/CD-single | 5:18 |

Remixed by Plutone.
The "Video Edit" is a shorter version of the "Experimental Mix". The version on the Hands on Yello CD is different from the version on the Hands on Yello – the Updates 2xCD, neither are similar to the versions on this single.

== Personnel ==
- Artwork by – KM7
- Lyrics by – Dieter Meier
- Music by – Boris Blank
- Photography – Serge Höltschi
