= Baby (Yello album) =

Studio album by Yello
- Released: 17 June 1991
- Recorded: 1990–1991
- Genre: Electronic
- Length: 38:54
- Labels: Mercury (most of the world); Vertigo (Canada)
- Producer: Yello

Yello chronology
Flag (1988)	Baby (1991)	Essential Yello (1992)

Singles from Baby
- 1. "Rubberbandman" Released: 13 May 1991; 2. "Who's Gone?" Released: 2 September 1991; 3. "Jungle Bill" Released: 24 August 1992; 4. "Drive/Driven" Released: 1993

Professional ratings
Review scores
Source	Rating
AllMusic	2.5/5 stars
Calgary Herald	B

Baby is the seventh studio album by the band Yello, released in 1991 under the label Mercury. An early cut of the album was used as the incidental soundtrack for the film The Adventures of Ford Fairlane.

== Track listing ==
All tracks by Blank/Meier except where noted.

1. "Homage to the Mountain" – 0:35
2. "Rubberbandman" – 3:37
3. "Jungle Bill" – 6:12
4. "Ocean Club" – 3:29
5. "Who's Gone?" – 3:41
6. "Capri Calling" (Blank, Mackenzie, Meier) – 3:02
7. "Drive/Driven" – 4:16
8. "On the Run" – 4:39
9. "Blender" – 4:36
10. "Sweet Thunder" – 5:27

== Personnel ==
Yello

- Boris Blank – background vocals, arrangements, engineering, mixing
- Dieter Meier – vocals

with:

- Billy Mackenzie – vocals, background vocals
- Marco Colombo – guitar
- Ernst Gamper – guitar, cover design
- Rolf Aschwander – accordion
- Beat Ash – percussion
- Kevin Metcalfe – mastering
- En Soie Zurich – wardrobe

== Charts ==
=== Weekly charts ===
Weekly chart performance for Baby
Chart (1991)	Peak position
Australian Albums (ARIA)	73
Austrian Albums (Ö3 Austria)	1
Dutch Albums (Album Top 100)	79
German Albums (Offizielle Top 100)	6
Swedish Albums (Sverigetopplistan)	17
Swiss Albums (Schweizer Hitparade)	5
UK Albums (Official Charts)	37

=== Year-end charts ===
Year-end chart performance for Baby
Chart (1991)	Position
German Albums (Offizielle Top 100)	84
Swiss Albums (Schweizer Hitparade)	31

=== Singles ===
Single	Chart (1993)	Peak position
"Jungle Bill"	US Hot Dance Music/Club Play	40
