= Håkan Lidbo =

Swedish music producer

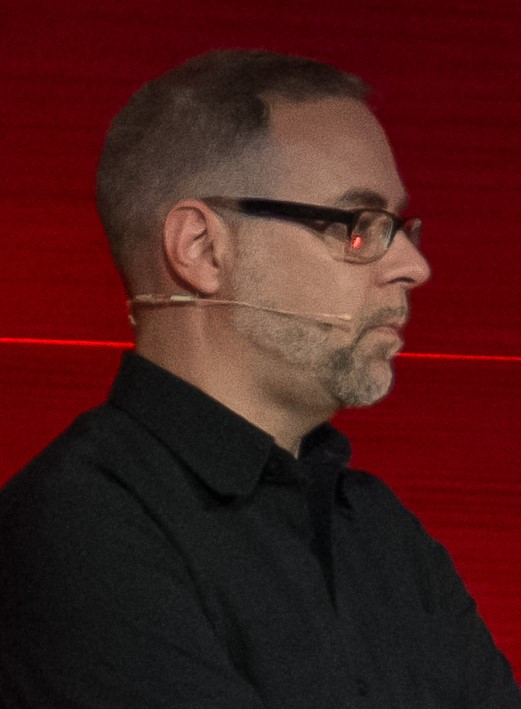
- Lidbo in 2013

Background information
- Born: 20 July 1965 (age 59); Sweden
- Genres: electronica
- Occupation: music producer

Håkan Lidbo (born 20 July 1965) is a Swedish music producer, primarily active in electronica, but also other genres. He has published over 350 records on a variety of record labels, is the editor of the radio show Power and operates Volt Festival in Uppsala. He is also behind the music project Pay TV that participated in the Swedish Melodifestivalen twice.

Lidbo was born in Malmö, Sweden.
