= Carlos Perón =

Swiss musician (born 1952)

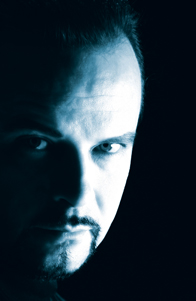
- Born: 9 June 1952 (age 74); Zürich, Switzerland
- Occupation: Musician
- Years active: 1979–present

Carlos Perón (born 9 June 1952) is a Swiss musician, composer, electronic music producer and sound designer. He is known as a co-founder of the electronic music group Yello, as well as for his subsequent solo work in electronic, experimental and industrial music. His career has also included film and television music, sound design, music production and work with independent record labels.

== Biography ==
Perón was born in Zürich, Switzerland, on 9 June 1952. He received classical flute training during childhood and developed an interest in electronic music during the 1960s. His early musical interests included the work of German composer Karlheinz Stockhausen and the techniques of electronic music and musique concrète.

His interest in electronic sound developed through experimentation with recording equipment, tape manipulation and electronic instruments. These experiments subsequently led to studio-based production and sound design.

== Career ==
=== Early Zürich music scene ===
Before the formation of Yello, Perón was involved in the Zürich new wave and experimental music scene. He played keyboards in the group Urland, where he worked with musicians including Boris Blank. After the group dissolved, Perón and Blank continued their collaborative experiments with electronic sound.

=== Tranceonic Studio ===
Perón and Boris Blank established the experimental Tranceonic Studio in Zürich. The studio served as a setting for their experiments with electronic instruments, tape, effects and recording techniques and became an important precursor to their later work with Yello.

In 1978, Perón and Blank travelled to the United States in an attempt to present their music to the American music industry. They visited RCA Records in Los Angeles and Ralph Records in San Francisco, the label associated with the experimental group The Residents.

=== Yello ===
Following the return to Switzerland, Dieter Meier became involved with Perón and Blank, and the three formed Yello. The group's early releases combined electronic instrumentation, sampling, experimental sound construction and vocals. Its first maxi-single included the tracks I.T. Splash and Glue Head and was released on Periphery Perfume Records.

Perón participated in Yello's early albums, including Solid Pleasure (1980), Claro Que Si (1981), and You Gotta Say Yes to Another Excess (1983).

Perón left Yello in the early 1980s to pursue independent work in music production and sound design.

=== Solo career ===
Perón began his solo recording career while still associated with Yello. His first solo album, Impersonator, was released in 1981.

His subsequent work developed independently of Yello and explored electronic, experimental and industrial forms. His releases include the Impersonator series and a number of projects incorporating synthesized sound, sampling, sound effects and studio experimentation.

Perón's solo work has continued into the 21st century. His catalogue includes later recordings and reissues such as Impersonator IV, CPRI – Carlos Perón Rex Industrialis, Miles of Perón, La Salle Blanche, Frigorex and Commando Leopard.

=== Film and television music ===
Perón has composed and produced music and soundtracks for film and television. His soundtrack work includes music associated with the films Die schwarze Spinne and Commando Leopard and the television program Schmidteinander.

=== Experimental and orchestral work ===
In addition to electronic music, Perón has produced experimental works that draw on broader musical and conceptual forms. Die Schöpfung der Welt; oder 7 Tage Gottes was released in 1985 by Milan Disques.

Record labels and production

Following his departure from Yello, Perón became involved in music production and independent record-label activities. He established Kristall Sound and later worked under the Eisenberg name, combining recording, production and label activities.

From the early 1990s, he worked with Strange Ways Records and its head Lothar Gärtner. His activities included solo releases and production work involving artists and groups associated with the label, including Wolfsheim, Sielwolf and The Cain Principle.

Fetish soundtracks

Perón has also released a series of works described as fetish soundtracks. Among these are Terminatrix and La Salle Blanche. These recordings form part of his experimental work with electronic sound and audiovisual themes.

=== Mastering ===
In addition to his work in music production and audio engineering, Perón has developed expertise in the field of audio mastering. His mastering work encompasses the technical and artistic preparation of recordings for commercial release, including tonal balance, dynamics, stereo imaging, loudness, and sonic consistency.

His approach to mastering combines critical listening with detailed technical analysis, with particular attention to preserving the character and musical intent of the original production. His knowledge includes both analogue and digital mastering techniques, as well as the preparation of masters for different distribution formats and playback environments.

=== Later career ===
Perón continued recording and performing after his work with Yello and his activities during the 1980s and 1990s. His later catalogue includes reissues of earlier material alongside new recordings and projects.

Among his later releases are BABY BOOMER REVOLTE, Go deeper within yourself, From the Stars They Came (3i Atlas), Coke from Columbia and ultra haunted overdrive. Streaming catalogues list releases under his name continuing into 2026.

=== Der Eisenberg Sampler ===
Since 1991, Perón has produced Der Eisenberg Sampler, a compilation series featuring electronic musicians. The series was established to provide exposure to emerging electronic artists. The sixteenth volume, released through EISENBERG/subculture, is scheduled for 2 October 2026, marking the 36th anniversary of the series.

=== Record labels ===
Perón has operated several independent labels, including DARK DAZE music INC., YellowSunshineBeat, antiK, Hochofen 8, adamáh, and EISENBERG. He has also worked with record labels and imprints including Teldec, Zeitgeist, Dark Star, Strange Way Records, Vertigo, Polydor, PIAS, Milan, Revisited Records, SPV, Phonag, Erdenklang, and subculture.

== Musical style ==
Perón's work is characterized by the use of electronic instruments, sampling, tape manipulation, effects processing and studio-based composition. His musical output has encompassed electronic music, experimental music, industrial music and sound design.

His early work with Yello combined electronic experimentation with rhythm-oriented compositions and unconventional studio techniques. His subsequent solo work has generally placed greater emphasis on experimental sound, electronic textures and the use of recording technology as a compositional tool.

== Discography ==
=== With Yello ===
- Solid Pleasure (1980)
- Claro Que Si (1981)
- You Gotta Say Yes to Another Excess (1983)

=== Solo albums and projects ===
- Impersonator (1981)
- Die Schöpfung der Welt; oder 7 Tage Gottes (1985)
- Impersonator IV
- CPRI – Carlos Perón Rex Industrialis
- Miles of Perón
- La Salle Blanche
- Frigorex
- Commando Leopard
- Terminatrix
- BABY BOOMER REVOLTE
- Go deeper within yourself
- From the Stars They Came (3i Atlas)
- Coke from Columbia
- ultra haunted overdrive
- Switched-on Bosch
- The dark side of Syd (DARK DAZE music INC./The Orchard)
- Geisterstunde Liveset RHIZOM Festival (DARK DAZE music INC./The Orchard)
- Paranormal (DARK DAZE music INC./The Orchard)
- Yellow Sunshine Beat/The Orchard Collection Volume 1
- Night of the death Halloween Set (subculture/The Orchard)
- The YELLO remixes 1978-2021
- Das Alte und Neue Testament (adamah/The Orchard)
- Closer & Closer (It comes) (YellowSunshineBeat/The Orchard)

== Filmography ==
Year	Title	Medium	Role
1981	Jetzt und alles	Film	Performer (with Yello)
1983	Kommando Leopard		Director
1983	Die schwarze Spinne	Film	Composer
1984	Olley: Lost Again	Music video Director	
1990–1991	Schmidteinander	Television series	Composer; sound effects
1991	Wolfsheim: The Sparrows and the Nightingales	Music video	Director
2011	Der Komtur	Music video	Director
2012	Daniel Sannwald – The Absence of Anything	Music Video	Composer
2014	Olley: By the River	Music video	Director
