= Malia (singer) =

Malawian musician (born 1978)

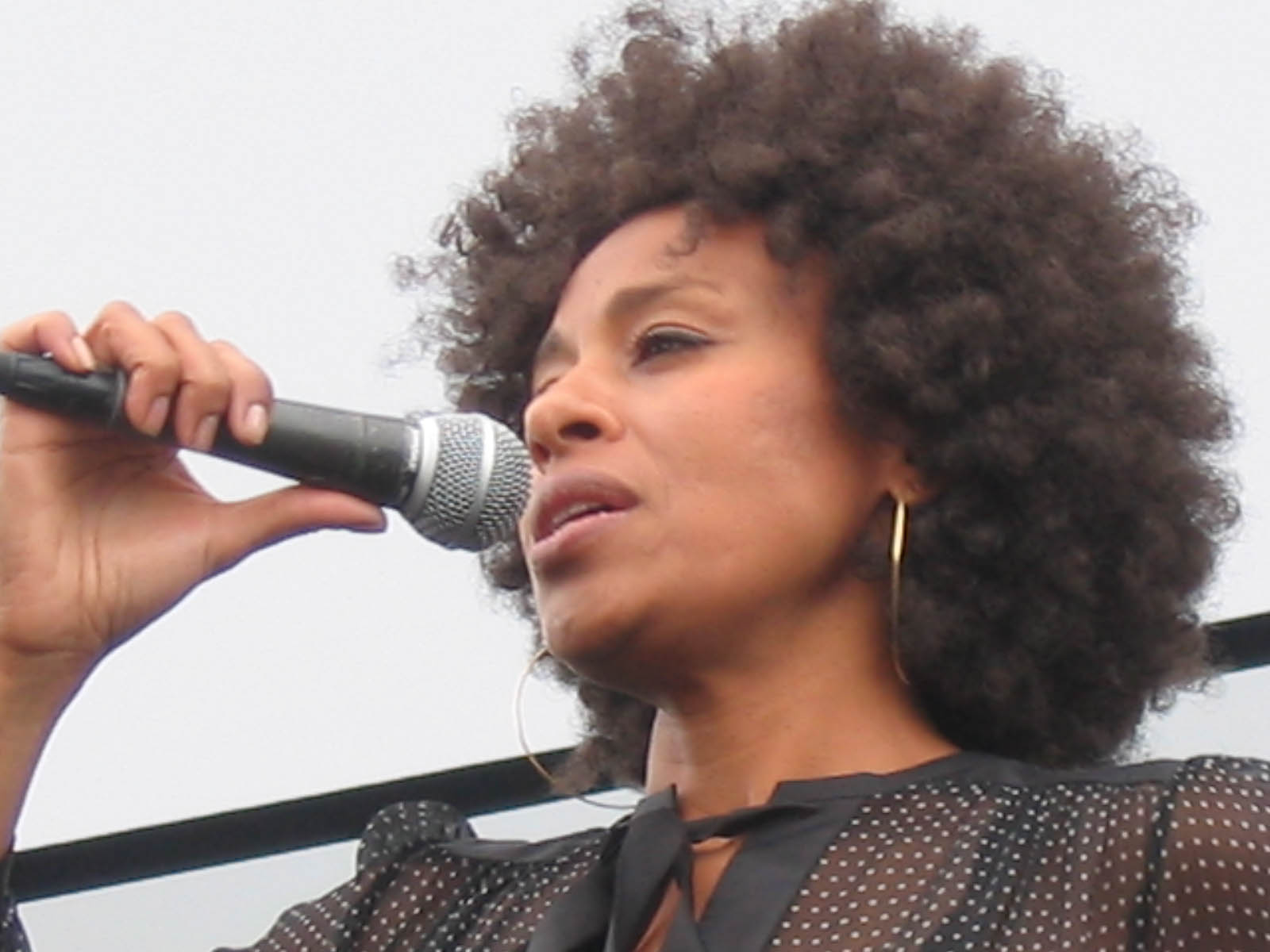
- Born: January 1, 1978 (age 48); Malawi
- Occupations: Jazz musician; singer

Malia (born 1978) is a singer from Malawi. She has released seven studio albums.

She also has a lengthy collaboration with Yello, making guest appearances on their Toy and Time Lab albums in addition to making a complete album with Boris Blank in 2014, Convergence.

== Biography ==
Malia's mother is Malawian and her father is from the United Kingdom. She moved to London when she was a teenager. After finishing school, Malia pursued a career in music.

== Discography ==
Year	Album	Peak positions			
Year	Album	AUT	FR	GER	SWI
2002	Yellow Daffodils	51	64	74	–
2004	Echoes of Dreams	–	100	–	–
2007	Young Bones	–	36	–	–
2012	Black Orchid	–	94	45	92
2014	Convergence (credited to Malia & Boris Blank)	39	107	24	12
2016	Malawi Blues / Njira	–	–	–	–
2020	The Garden of Eve	–	–	–	–
