= Pocket Universe =

Studio album by Yello
- Released: February 24, 1997
- Recorded: 1996
- Genre: Electronica
- Length: 1:13:33
- Labels: Mercury, 534 353-2
- Producers: Yello; Carl Cox

Yello chronology
Zebra (1994)	Pocket Universe (1997)	Motion Picture (1999)

Singles from Pocket Universe
- 1. "To the Sea" Released: 3 February 1997

Professional ratings
Review scores
Source	Rating
AllMusic	2.5/5 stars
Uncut	4/5 stars

Pocket Universe is the ninth studio album by the Swiss band Yello. It was released on 24 February 1997 through Mercury Records. Production was handled by Yello and Carl Cox, with Ian Tregoning and Leos Gerteis serving as vocal co-producers. It features a lone guest appearance from Stina Nordenstam.

The album peaked at number 7 in Switzerland, number 9 in Norway, number 17 in Germany, number 21 in Austria, number 29 in Sweden and number 71 in the Netherlands.

Its lead single, "To the Sea", made it to number 23 in Switzerland, number 48 in Sweden and number 83 in Germany. The song "On Track" reached number 16 on the US Hot Dance Music/Club Play chart.

== Track listing ==
No.	Title	Writer(s)	Producer(s)	Length
1.	"Solar Driftwood"	Boris Blank; Dieter Meier	Yello	1:51
2.	"Celsius"	Blank; Meier	Yello	5:59
3.	"More"	Blank; Meier	Yello	6:39
4.	"On Track"	Blank; Meier	Yello	5:33
5.	"Monolith"	Blank; Meier	Yello	6:21
6.	"To the Sea"	Blank; Kristina Ulrika Nordenstam	Yello	5:46
7.	"Magnetic"	Blank; Meier	Boris Blank; Carl Cox	5:53
8.	"Liquid Mountain"	Blank; Meier	Yello	2:58
9.	"Pan Blue"	Blank; Meier	Yello	5:31
10.	"Resistor"	Blank; Meier	Yello	7:13
11.	"Beyond Mirrors"	Blank; Meier	Yello	5:49
12.	"To the Sea (Remix by Steve B‐Zet)"	Blank; Nordenstam		4:06
Total length:				1:13:33

Notes

- Track 12 is a bonus track not mentioned on track list.

== Personnel ==
- Boris Blank — producer, composer, arrangement, engineering
- Dieter Meier — lyrics & vocals (tracks: 1–5, 7–11), producer (tracks: 1–6, 8–11)
- Kristina Ulrika "Stina" Nordenstam — lyrics & vocals (track 6)
- Carl Cox — producer (track 7)
- Ian Tregoning — vocal co-producer
- Leoš Gerteis — vocal co-producer
- Steffen "Stevie B-Zet" Britzke — re-mixing (track 12)
- Kevin Metcalfe — mastering
- Martin Wanner — cover
- Peter Zumsteg — management

== Charts ==
Chart (1997)	Peak position
Austrian Albums (Ö3 Austria)	21
Dutch Albums (Album Top 100)	71
German Albums (Offizielle Top 100)	17
Hungarian Albums (MAHASZ)	24
Norwegian Albums (VG-lista)	9
Swedish Albums (Sverigetopplistan)	29
Swiss Albums (Schweizer Hitparade)	7
