= Nuns on the Run =

1990 British comedy film by Jonathan Lynn

- Promotional release poster
- Directed by: Jonathan Lynn
- Written by: Jonathan Lynn
- Produced by: Michael White
- Starring: Eric Idle; Robbie Coltrane; Janet Suzman; Camille Coduri
- Cinematography: Michael Garfath
- Edited by: David Martin
- Music by: Yello; Hidden Faces; (Frank Fitzpatrick and David Kitay)
- Production company: HandMade Films
- Distributed by: 20th Century Fox
- Release dates: March 16, 1990 (United States); May 4, 1990 (London); May 26, 1990 (United Kingdom)
- Running time: 89 minutes
- Country: United Kingdom
- Language: English
- Budget: £3 million
- Box office: $11 million (USA)

Nuns on the Run is a 1990 British comedy film starring Eric Idle and Robbie Coltrane, also featuring Camille Coduri and Janet Suzman. The film was written and directed by Jonathan Lynn and produced by HandMade Films. Many of the outdoor scenes were shot in Chiswick, White City and Kings Cross. The soundtrack was composed and performed by Yello and also features George Harrison's song "Blow Away" in addition to Steve Winwood's "Roll With It". The film was released on 16 March 1990.

== Plot ==
After their boss is killed during a bank robbery, London gangsters Brian Hope and Charlie McManus desire to lead more peaceful lives in Brazil, disapproving of their new younger and more brash boss, Casey. While planning to rob a local Triad gang of their ill-gotten drug money, Brian meets and falls in love with a waitress, Faith. During the robbery, Brian and Charlie betray their fellow gangsters, Abbott and Morley, steal the money and flee, but are forced to abandon their car when it runs out of petrol and seek refuge in a nearby nunnery during the ensuing gunfight. Faith, who had tried to warn Brian beforehand, is shot in the wrist by Abbott, while one of the triads is shot and hospitalised. After this, Casey places a bounty on Brian and Charlie's heads.

Disguising themselves as nuns, Brian and Charlie introduce themselves to the Sister Superior, Liz, as Sisters Inviolata and Euphemia, respectively. Faith, having witnessed the gunfight and Brian and Charlie fleeing into the nunnery, follows them and poses as a mature student to get inside. Her gunshot wound is exposed and she is taken to the infirmary. Brian pays her a secret visit and claims he is married in order to end their relationship for her safety. When Faith intends to go to church and confess, Charlie distracts the priest, Father Seamus, while Brian poses as him. Faith admits she still loves Brian, but Brian convinces Faith to keep silent. On her way out, she is abducted by the Triads and interrogated. She directs them to Casey and they set her free, but bumps into a lamppost and hits her head on the road, ending up in the hospital, where one Triad has infiltrated the staff as a cleaner. Brian and Charlie acquire tickets to Brazil, despite Brian's desire to take Faith with them.

Brian decides to tell Faith the truth, but discovers she has not returned to the nunnery. They go to her flat and only barely escape from Abbott and Morley, who had been sent to retrieve her by Casey. They sneak back into the nunnery and manage to slip into their spare habits after accidentally waking up an eccentric nun, Sister Mary. In conversation, Brian learns that Faith is in the hospital, with her father and brother who are protecting her from the gang. He visits her, but she is heartbroken, believing that Brian no longer loves her. They wake up and leave for the airport the next morning, but are caught and exposed by Sister Mary. In desperation, they steal a utility and drive to the airport pursued by Sisters Liz and Mary, Morley and Abbott, and eventually Casey and the Triads. Brian forces Charlie to go to the hospital, where Brian tells Faith the truth while Charlie stalls the gangsters. They manage to escape the hospital with Faith and Casey is arrested, though one briefcase of money is lost during the chase. Sister Liz and Sister Mary find the lost briefcase and, ignoring the police concerns, decide to use it to fund a drug rehabilitation clinic. Sister Liz then leads the nuns in prayer, thanking God for sending them Sisters Euphemia and Inviolata, and asking him to, "keep on eye on them, won't you? They need you."

Brian, Charlie and Faith reach the airport and check-in, when an airport policeman warns the attendant about Brian and Charlie. They board a British Airways Boeing 747-200 jumbo jet, disguised as attendants, and successfully escape the UK for Brazil.

== Cast ==
- Eric Idle as Brian Hope/Sister Euphemia of the Five Wounds
- Robbie Coltrane as Charlie McManus/Sister Inviolata of the Immaculate Conception
- Janet Suzman as Sister Liz, the Sister Superior of the nunnery
- Camille Coduri as Faith Thomas
- Robert Patterson as Mr. "Case" Casey
- Doris Hare as Sister Mary of the Sacred Heart
- Lila Kaye as Sister Mary of the Annunciation
- Tom Hickey as Father Seamus, the somewhat lecherous priest of the nunnery
- Colin Campbell as Norm
- Robert Morgan as Abbott, one of Casey's henchmen
- Winston Dennis as Morley, one of Casey's henchmen and the bouncer of his health club
- Gary Tang as Ronnie Chang, the head of the Triads
- David Forman as Henry Ho
- Ozzie Yue as Ernie Wong, the most senior of the Triads

== Production ==
The film was written by Jonathan Lynn, who showed it to Eric Idle - the two had known each other since Cambridge University. Idle agreed to make it and tried to get the film financed through Prominent Features, the film company formed by members of Monty Python in 1985 to produce their individual and group projects. Idle was unsuccessful and instead finance was raised through HandMade Films. Denis O'Brien of HandMade agreed to finance on the proviso that Idle was in the film.

In December 1987 a copy of the script was sent to Michael Palin "with Eric's blessing" indicating that Eric Idle was already attached. However Palin did not want to make it as he was busy making American Friends. Idle suggested Robbie Coltrane be cast instead.

Filming started in April 1989. Filming of the convent exterior took place at St. Michael & All Angels Church on Priory Avenue, Chiswick, west London. Interior shots were done at former Royal Masonic School for Boys at Bushey in Hertfordshire. Other locations include White City, Putney and other parts of central London.

Idle recalled making the movie as "a wonderful experience... I really had a great time. It was the right team, all together, no shitty people intervening and trying to say 'This is the way it should be'."

The movie was bought for distribution in the US by 20th Century Fox. Head of production Joe Roth requested a new ending be shot and offered $500,000 to finance it. Lynn wrote a new ending and also re-shot a love scene. Lynn's work impressed Fox so much the studio offered him My Cousin Vinny as a future project.

== Release ==
The film opened in the United States first on 16 March 1990. It opened at the Odeon Haymarket in London on 4 May 1990 before opening nationwide in the UK on 25 May 1990.

== Reception ==
The film received mixed reviews from critics, and was criticised in the United States for its lack of depth and excessive use of nuns for humour, and for the film's basic concept being a rehash of the 1959 classic Some Like It Hot. On Rotten Tomatoes, the film has a 42% rating based on reviews from 26 critics, with an average rating of 4.6/10.

Roger Ebert asked, "Why do filmmakers so often insist that nuns are funny? I'll bet there are some psychological reasons buried around here somewhere." Ebert and Gene Siskel had also ridiculed Fox's advertising campaign for the film; in retaliation, Fox's president of marketing, Bob Harper, announced that they would be barred from press screenings of future films released by the company, though he backed down after only three weeks under pressure from the Chicago Film Critics Association (of which neither Siskel nor Ebert was a member). Michael Wilmington of the Los Angeles Times noted that as far as drag comedies go, the film "has some bawdy class—but only because of its casting".

Vincent Canby wrote in The New York Times that "Nuns on the Run is a great leveler. It makes everyone in the audience feel a rascally 8 years old, the age at which whoopee cushions (when they work) seem the greatest invention since firecrackers." Owen Gleiberman wrote in one of Entertainment Weekly's first issues that the film "isn't a madcap-hysterical, end-of-the-empire drag farce; it doesn't hash over what Monty Python did definitively over 20 years ago. It's a cleverly directed caper comedy about two crooks on the lam, and it has its fair share of chuckles."

=== Box office ===
The movie was a hit in Britain and made £3.2 million at the UK box office.

The film was successful in the US on limited release, making $658,835 in its first screenings at 76 theatres. Nuns on the Run grossed US$10,959,015, according to Box Office Mojo. However according to Idle "They were really hoping for big things in America and it didn't happen... It did happen everywhere else - it happened in Europe, it was big in England, the video was big.It was nice but they didn't make a killing in the States like they wanted to do."

Idle felt Fox made a mistake opening the film on a few screens and letting word of mouth take effect, the technique used on A Fish Called Wanda. "They got confused and caught between two marketing plans," said Idle.

== Home media ==
The distribution rights for Nuns on the Run were initially held by Anchor Bay Entertainment for DVD release in the United Kingdom. The original DVD was made available on 8 April 2002. A second printing was released on 10 October 2005 under its subsidiary 'Bay View', while a third and final release came from Anchor Bay, alongside Time Bandits in a 'Double Disc Box Set' on 6 February 2006. After which, the then Optimum Releasing (now StudioCanal UK) released the film on 4 January 2010. Arrow Films currently hold distribution rights to the film as all previous releases are now out-of-print. Arrow released Nuns on the Run to DVD on 27 June 2016, with a reissue distributed on 17 April 2019.

== See also ==
- Cross-dressing in film and television

== Notes ==
- Johnson, Kim (1993). Life (before and) after Monty Python : the solo flights of the flying circus. St. Martin's Press.
