= Yello =

Swiss music group

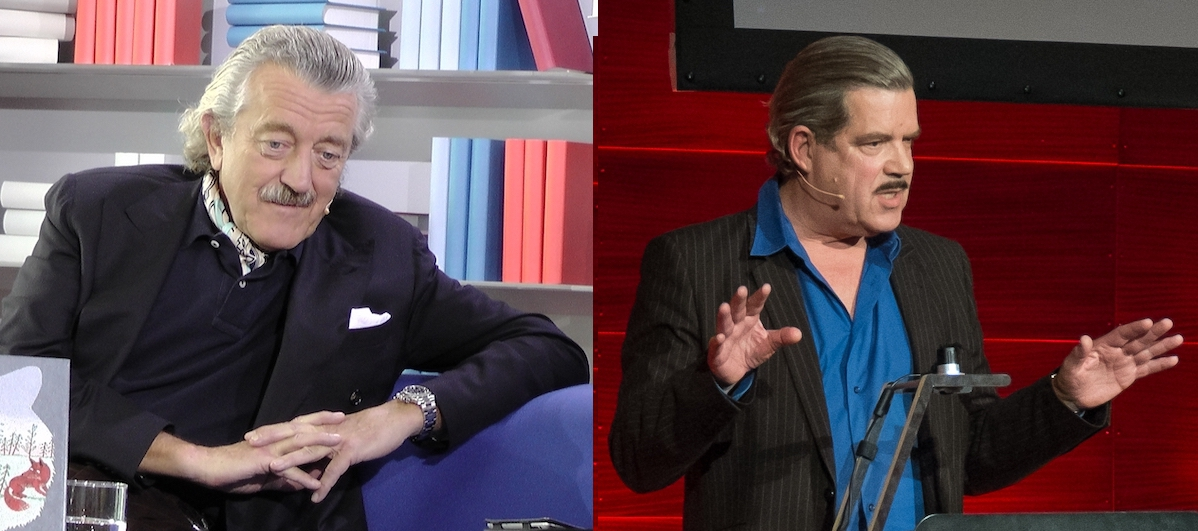
- Dieter Meier (left) and Boris Blank

Background information
- Origin: Zürich, Switzerland
- Genres: Synth-pop; new wave; electro-pop; techno; electronic
- Years active: 1979–present
- Labels: Polydor; Mercury; Vertigo; 4th & B'way; Smash; Elektra; Ralph; Do It; Stiff
- Members: Dieter Meier; Boris Blank
- Past members: Carlos Perón
- Website: www.yello.com

Yello is a Swiss electronic music band, which formed in Zürich in 1979. For most of the band's history, Yello has been a duo consisting of Dieter Meier and Boris Blank; founding member Carlos Perón left in 1983.

Their sound is often characterised by unusual music samples and a reliance on rhythm, with Meier as vocalist and lyricist and with Blank providing the music. Their 1985 single "Oh Yeah" has appeared in many films and television shows, including Ferris Bueller's Day Off, The Secret of My Success, Uncle Buck, and The Simpsons; and "The Race" (1988), which peaked at number 7 on the UK Singles Chart. The band has released 14 studio albums since 1980.

== History ==
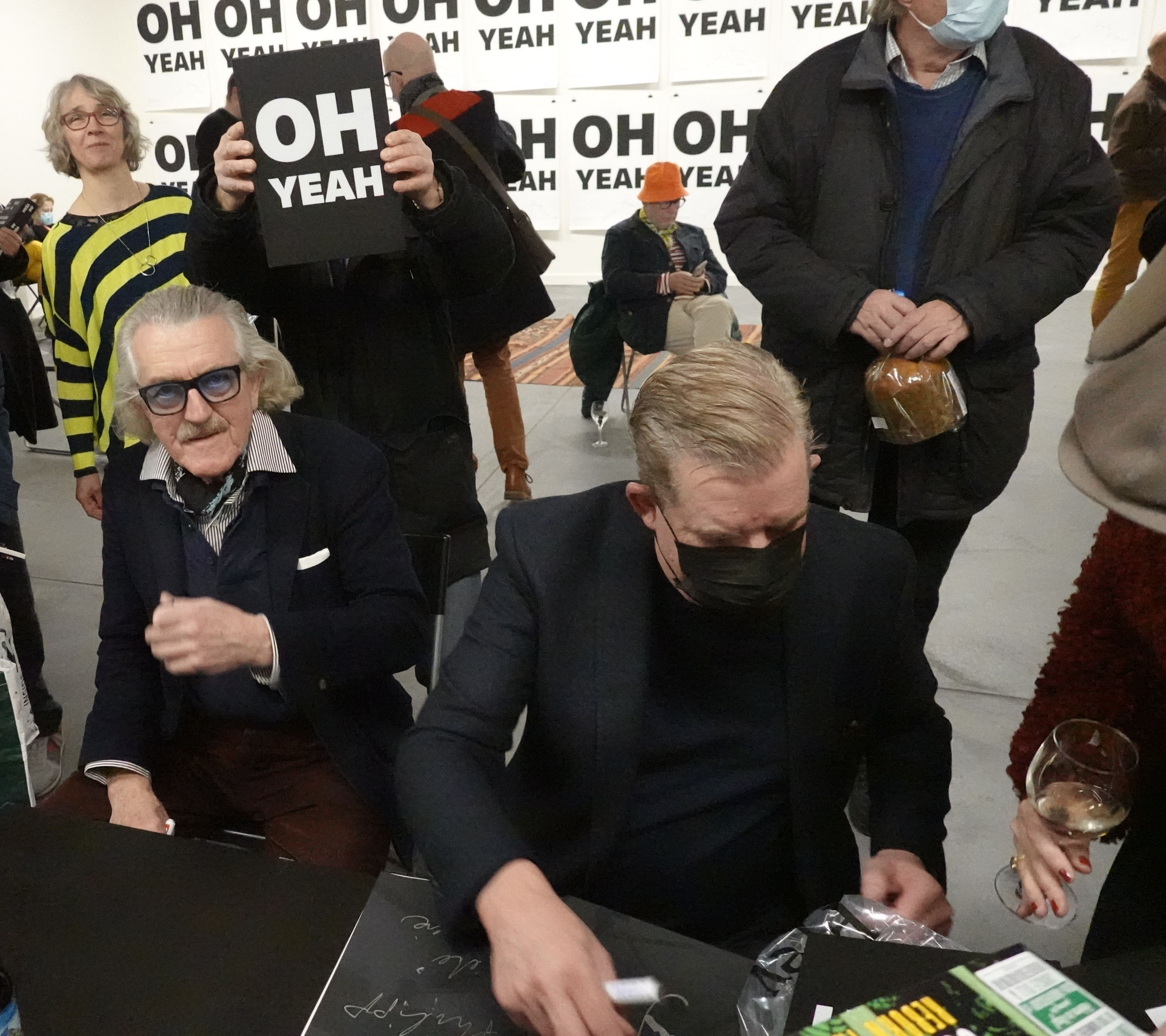
Yello's Dieter Meier & Boris Blank signing their book 2021 in Zurich

The band was formed by Boris Blank (keyboards, sampling, percussion, backing vocals) and Carlos Perón (tapes) in the late 1970s. Dieter Meier (vocals, lyrics), a millionaire investor and gambler, was brought in when the two founders realized that they needed a singer. The new band's name, Yello, was chosen as a neologism based on a comment made by Meier, "a yelled Hello".

Yello's first release was the 1979 single "I.T. Splash". The LP Solid Pleasure, featuring the original short version of "Bostich" (extended to a hit dance single in 1981), was released in November 1980. Yello's first video was made for the song "Pinball Cha Cha" in 1981; this was included in a 1985 video exhibit at Museum of Modern Art in New York. In early 1983, just after release of You Gotta Say Yes to Another Excess, Perón left Yello to pursue a solo career.

The band's fourth studio album Stella went No. 1 in Switzerland in 1985 as the first album ever by a Swiss group to top the Swiss album chart. It also appeared inside the German top 10, gaining gold status. The song "Oh Yeah" from the album gained the band worldwide attention the following year, after it prominently appeared in the 1986 film Ferris Bueller's Day Off and then a year later in The Secret of My Success. The song was released shortly after and became the band's only single to chart in the US, reaching No. 51, and their only top-50 hit in Australia, reaching No. 9.

In 1988, single "The Race" from the album Flag reached No. 7 in the UK as their only top-10 hit there. It featured in the film Nuns on the Run. In May 1990, Yello performed at the World Music Awards in Monaco and received an award for Best-Selling Swiss Group.

In 1990, they scored the background for the film The Adventures of Ford Fairlane.

In 1995, a tribute remix album Hands on Yello was released, featuring remixes by Moby, the Orb, Carl Craig, Carl Cox, the Grid and WestBam.

In 2005, Yello re-released their early albums Solid Pleasure, Claro Que Si, You Gotta Say Yes to Another Excess, Stella, One Second and Flag, all with bonus tracks, as part of the Yello Remaster Series.

A documentary on Yello, Electro Pop Made in Switzerland, directed by Anka Schmid, premiered at the Riff Raff cinema in Zürich in September 2005.

Yello was commissioned to produce music for the launch of the Audi A5 at the Geneva Motor Show in March 2007 and for the Audi A5 advertisement in May 2007.

== Style ==
Yello's sound is mainly characterized by unusual music samples, a heavy reliance on rhythm, and Dieter Meier's dark voice. Yello makes extensive use of sampling in the construction of rhythm tracks, such as in "The Race" from 1988. Boris Blank has taken a couple of vocal turns on "Swing" (from You Gotta Say Yes to Another Excess) and "Blazing Saddles" (from Flag). Guest vocalists have included Rush Winters, Billy Mackenzie, Stina Nordenstam, Jade Davies, Shirley Bassey, Heidi Happy, and FiFi Rong. The group has shared writing credit with Mackenzie, Winters, and Happy.

Yello rarely uses samples from previously released music; nearly every instrument has been sampled and re-engineered by Boris Blank, who over the years has built up an original sample library of thousands of named and categorised sounds.

Arts Desk critic Thomas H. Green wrote, "When Yello began at the end of the Seventies, they were members of an elite club – Kraftwerk, Human League, Gary Numan, OMD, Yellow Magic Orchestra, and the rest of that relatively small crew of innovators. Yello's use of sampling was ahead of its time, and singles such as 'Bostich' and 'I Love You' (and, a few years later, 'The Race') bridged the avant-garde, pop and techno (before the last had even been invented)."

== Discography ==
- Solid Pleasure (1980)
- Claro Que Si (1981)
- You Gotta Say Yes to Another Excess (1983)
- Stella (1985)
- One Second (1987)
- Flag (1988)
- Baby (1991)
- Zebra (1994)
- Pocket Universe (1997)
- Motion Picture (1999)
- The Eye (2003)
- Touch Yello (2009)
- Toy (2016)
- Point (2020)
- Time Lab (2026)

== Literature ==
- Boris Blank/Dieter Meier: Oh Yeah / Yello 40, Edition Patrick Frey, 2021, Zurich. ISBN 978-3-907236-35-2.

== Live performances ==
The band's first live performance was on 18 September 1978 at the Cinema Forum in Zurich titled "Dead Cat". The performance was originally 15 minutes long and only showed Meier, due to Blank's stage fright at the time. Out of the fifteen minutes of the performance, only four minutes have been publicly circulated on the internet. It has never been released on other formats.

Their second live performance was in December 1983 at the Roxy Club, where they played a more techno-like remix of "Bostich". It is another 15-minute performance hosted by Dianne Brill. This time Blank is showing himself too. The single is available as a clear vinyl in the remaster series.

Their most recent live performance was on 3 November 2017 in Berlin, where they played their older and newer songs with additional musicians and background vocalists.
