= Dieter Meier =

Swiss musician, vocalist, conceptual artist, and industrialist

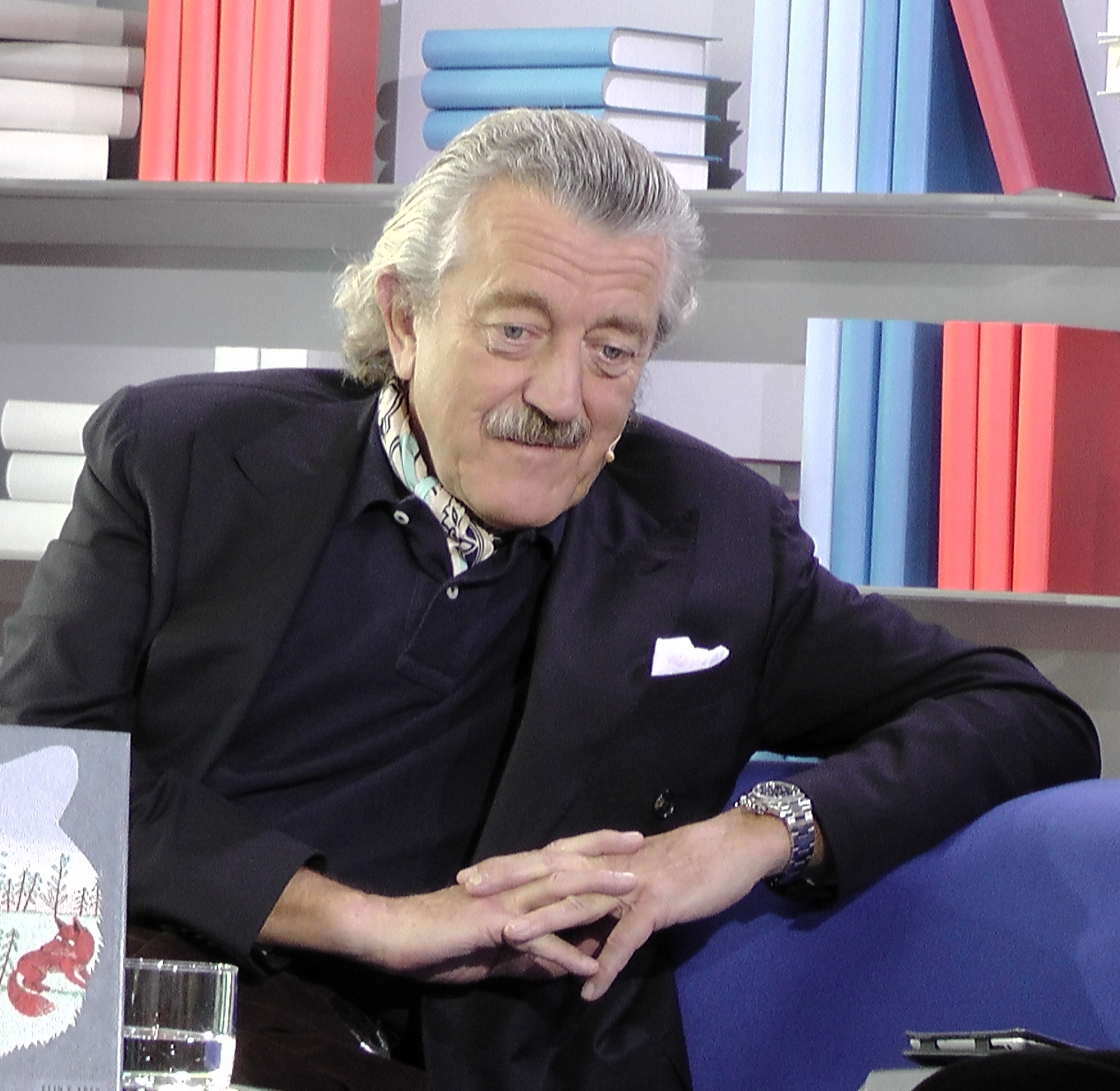
- Meier in 2011

Background information
- Born: 4 March 1945 (age 81); Zürich, Switzerland
- Genre: Electronic
- Occupations: Musician; conceptual artist
- Instrument: Vocals
- Years active: 1979–present
- Website: dietermeier.com

Dieter Meier (born 4 March 1945) is a Swiss musician, conceptual artist and entrepreneur. He is the frontman of the electronic music group Yello, which was co-founded (with ex-member Carlos Perón) by music producer Boris Blank. He is a vocalist and lyricist, as well as manager and producer of the group.

== Biography and career ==
=== Early life ===
Meier was born on 4 March 1945 in Zürich, Switzerland. He started studying law at university, but dropped out without a degree. After that, he tried working at a bank and as a professional gambler. Due to his father, who Meier claims rose from poor origins to become a successful private banker, by the time he went to university, Meier was already a millionaire.

=== Musical career ===
In the late 1970s, Meier was brought in when the two founders of the Swiss electronic band Yello required a singer. The band was originally formed by Boris Blank (keyboards, sampling, percussion, backing vocals) and Carlos Perón (tapes) in the late 1970s. Perón left the band in 1983 to pursue a solo career. Meier provided almost all vocals, backing vocals and lyrics for "Oh Yeah", Yello's most commercially successful single. The song appears in numerous films and television shows, including Ferris Bueller's Day Off and an episode of South Park "Hell on Earth 2006".

Along with Talking Heads vocalist David Byrne, Meier was a guest artist on the X-Press 2 album Muzikizum. He also performed lead vocals on the single "I Want You Back".

Prior to Yello in 1978 he recorded two punk singles "Jim For Tango" and "Cry For Fame".

=== Artist ===
As a conceptual artist, he exhibits at art exhibitions. He began his career as a performance artist in the late 1960s. In 1972 as part of Documenta 5 art exhibition, Meier installed a commemorative plaque at the railway station in Kassel (Germany) which read: "On 23 March 1994, from 3 to 4 pm, Dieter Meier will stand on this plaque". He honored the promise 22 years later.

Meier has directed films and videos, including German music group Alphaville's "Big in Japan" video. His wife Monique also took a part in the video.

In the 1990s Meier continued his performance art, designed silk scarves and was involved with ReWATCH, a company that recycles cans into watches. In the late nineties, he bought 2,200 hectares (5,400 acres) of land in Argentina, a four-hour drive away from Buenos Aires. The ranch is named "Ojo de Agua". His restaurant and store in Zürich has the same name from which he sells wine, meat, corn and soy products.

=== Acting ===
In 1989, Meier played a demimonde businessman in the Swiss drama-comedy Leo Sonnyboy by Rolf Lyssy, and in 1992, he had a part in the Daniel Schmid comedy, Hors Saison. In 2006, he acted in the bit part of 'Gamsie' in National Lampoon's Pledge This! In 2013, he played a furrier in the film Finsterworld.

=== Business ventures ===
Meier has invested in several companies in various industries. He acquired a controlling interest in Euphonix, a producer of digital mixing desks for recording studios, and became chairman of the board. In 2010 he sold the company at a loss to Avid Technology.

His successful investments in companies and business ventures during the last decades have brought Meier assets which are estimated around 150-200 million Swiss franc as of 2017.

== Personal life ==
Meier lives in Zürich with his wife Monique. He is the father of five children.

Around 2022, Meier contracted COVID-19; in a 2024 interview with Stereophile, Blank stated that Meier was struggling with chronic fatigue as a complication of the disease.
