= Boris Blank (musician) =

Swiss artist and musician

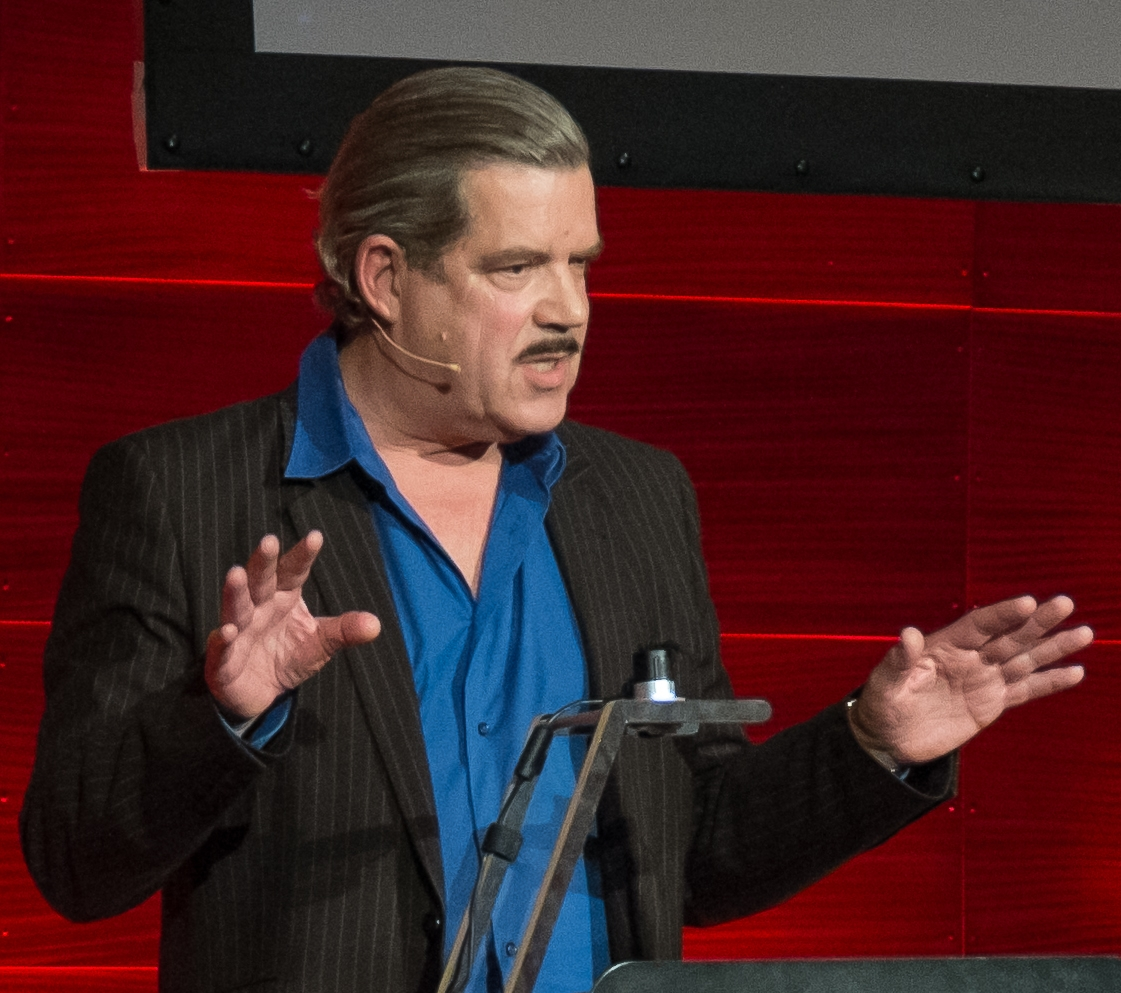
- Blank at TEDx Hamburg in 2013

Background information
- Born: 15 January 1952 (age 74); Bern, Switzerland
- Genres: Electronic
- Occupations: Musician; conceptual artist
- Instruments: Vocals; keyboards; synthesizers
- Years active: 1979–present
- Labels: Polydor; Mercury; Vertigo; 4th & B'way; Smash; Elektra; Ralph; Do It; Stiff
- Website: borisblank.com

Boris Blank (born 15 January 1952) is a Swiss artist and musician. He forms the musical duo Yello with Dieter Meier.

== Career ==
Boris Blank was born on 15 January 1952 in Bern, Switzerland. He is the musical part of Yello. He composes the songs and is responsible for the characteristic sound, having the reputation of a perfectionist. Blank considers himself as a constructor of music, starting composing with manipulation of self-recorded samples and finishing the tracks with the participation of invited professional musicians.

Prior to his musical career, Blank worked as a truck driver. As a child he was very interested in music, but had no formal training. He never learned to read musical notation but always was interested in producing new sounds and samples. Blank began experimenting with tape loops and echo effects as a teenager. He recorded water sounds from a bucket of water and played sounds on a homemade bamboo flute. It was in this period he met Carlos Perón. Later, they formed Yello, with Dieter Meier as a conceptualist, vocalist and lyricist.

He also composes and produces solo music, under the name Avant Garden, for licensing to the film and TV production industry. This music is handled by Extreme Music.

== Personal life ==
Blank is married to Italian-Swiss restaurateur Patrizia Fontana. They have a daughter, Olivia.

== Discography ==
=== Albums ===
Year	Album	Peak positions			
Year	Album	AUT	FR	GER	SWI
2024	Resonance	-	-	-	-
2014	Convergence (credited to Malia / Boris Blank)	39	107	24	12
2014	Electrified	-	-	-	-
