= The Associates discography =

Discography

- Studio albums: 5
- EPs: 2
- Compilation albums: 10
- Singles: 22
- Remix albums: 1

This is the discography of Scottish post-punk/new wave band the Associates.

== Albums ==
=== Studio albums ===
Title	Album details	Peak chart positions		
Title	Album details	UK	NL	NZ
The Affectionate Punch	Released: 1 August 1980; Label: Fiction; Formats: LP, MC	—	—	48
Sulk	Released: 14 May 1982; Label: Associates/Beggars Banquet; Formats: LP, MC	10	—	23
Perhaps	Released: 8 February 1985; Label: WEA; Formats: LP, MC	23	29	—
The Glamour Chase	Released: Commercially unavailable until 2002; A pre-release promo cassette was released on 15 September 1988, but the album was rejected for release by WEA	—	—	—
Wild and Lonely	Released: 24 March 1990; Label: Circa; Formats: CD, LP, MC	71	—	—
"—" denotes releases that did not chart or were not released in that territory.

=== Compilation albums ===
Title	Album details	Peak chart positions
Title	Album details	UK Indie
Fourth Drawer Down	Released: October 1981; Label: Situation Two; Formats: LP, MC	5
Popera – The Singles Collection	Released: November 1990; Label: EastWest; Formats: CD, LP, MC	—
The Radio 1 Sessions	Released: August 1994; Label: Nighttracks; Formats: CD	—
Double Hipness	Released: August 2000; Label: V2; Formats: 2xCD	—
The Glamour Chase & Perhaps	Released: 6 May 2002; Label: Warner; Formats: 2xCD set	—
The Radio One Sessions Volume One 1981–1983	Released: 24 February 2003; Label: Strange Fruit; Formats: CD	—
The Radio One Sessions Vol.2 1984–1985	Released: 30 June 2003; Label: Strange Fruit; Formats: CD	—
Singles	Released: 26 July 2004; Label: Warner; Formats: 2xCD	—
Sulk : Fourth Drawer Down	Released: 24 May 2004; Label: V2; Formats: 2xCD set	—
The Very Best Of	Released: 8 April 2016; Label: Union Square Music/Metro Select; Formats: 2xCD, digital download	—
"—" denotes releases that did not chart.

=== Remix albums ===
Title	Album details
The Affectionate Punch	Released: December 1982; Label: Fiction; Formats: LP, MC; Remix of their debut album

== EPs ==
Title	Album details
The Peel Sessions	Released: October 1989; Label: Strange Fruit; Formats: CD, 12"
Poperetta EP	Released: 14 January 1991; Label: EastWest; Formats: 7", 12"

== Singles ==
Title	Year	Peak chart positions					Album
Title	Year	UK	UK Indie	IRE	NL	US Dance	Album
"Boys Keep Swinging"	1979	—	—	—	—	—	Non-album single
"The Affectionate Punch"	1980	—	—	—	—	—	The Affectionate Punch
"Tell Me Easter's on Friday"	1981	—	8	—	—	—	Fourth Drawer Down
"Kites" (as 39 Lyon Street)	1981	—	—	—	—	—	Non-album single
"Q Quarters"	1981	—	5	—	—	—	Fourth Drawer Down
"Kitchen Person"	1981	—	9	—	—	—	Fourth Drawer Down
"A"	1981	—	—	—	—	—	The Affectionate Punch
"Message Oblique Speech"	1981	—	22	—	—	—	Fourth Drawer Down
"White Car in Germany"	1981	—	11	—	—	—	Fourth Drawer Down
"Party Fears Two"	1982	9	—	16	—	—	Sulk
"Club Country"	1982	13	—	22	—	—	Sulk
"18 Carat Love Affair"/"Love Hangover"	1982	21	—	21	—	—	Non-album single
"A Matter of Gender"	1982	—	—	—	—	—	The Affectionate Punch (remix)
"Those First Impressions"	1984	43	—	—	—	—	Perhaps
"Waiting for the Loveboat"	1984	53	—	—	—	—	Perhaps
"Breakfast"	1985	49	—	—	36	—	Perhaps
"Take Me to the Girl"	1985	95	—	—	—	—	Non-album single
"Heart of Glass"	1988	56	—	—	—	—	The Glamour Chase
"Country Boy'" (withdrawn)	1988	—	—	—	—	—	The Glamour Chase
"Fever"	1990	81	—	—	—	—	Wild and Lonely
"Fire to Ice"	1990	92	—	—	—	30	Wild and Lonely
"Just Can't Say Goodbye"	1991	79	—	—	—	—	Wild and Lonely
"—" denotes releases that did not chart or were not released in that territory.

=== Selected compilation appearances ===
- "Aggressive and Ninety Pounds" (as 'the Associates featuring Billy Mackenzie') on Mad Mix II cassette (1983), NME
