= Mike Hedges production discography =

This is the discography of record producer Mike Hedges.

== Discography ==
Year	Title	Artist	Label	Producer	Engineer	Mixing	Arranger	Ref(s).
1978	Evita: Original London Cast Recording	Various artists	MCA Records		(Note: Hedges was credited as an Assistant Engineer for this album)			liner
1977	Central Heating	Heatwave	GTO Records		check			liner
1978	Electric Glide	Gary Boyle	Esoteric Recordings		check			liner
1978	Hobo with a Grin	Steve Harley	BGO Records			check		
1978	Barbara Thompson's Paraphernalia	Barbara Thompson's Paraphernalia	MCA Records		check			liner
1979	Three Imaginary Boys	The Cure	Fiction Records		check			
1979	The Candidate	Steve Harley	EMI Records			(Note: On The Candidate, Hedges was the mixer for the song "Freedom's Prisoner")		liner
1979	The Mafia Stole My Guitar	Alex Harvey	RCA Records		check			
1980	I Just Can't Stop It	The Beat	Fiction Records		check			
1980	The Affectionate Punch	Associates	Fiction Records	check	check			
1980	Seventeen Seconds	The Cure	Fiction Records	check	check			
1980	Boys Don't Cry	The Cure	Fiction Records		check			
1981	Hit It!	The Beat	Go-Feet Records	check				
1981	A	Associates	Fiction Records	check				
1981	Fourth Drawer Down	Associates	Situation Two	check				
1981	Mask	Bauhaus	Beggars Banquet Records		check			
1981	"Charlotte Sometimes" (single)	The Cure	Fiction Records	check				
1981	Faith	The Cure	Fiction Records	check	check			
1981	...Happily Ever After	The Cure	A&M Records	check	check			
1982	"The Love Parade" (single)	The Undertones	Ardeck Records	check				
1982	Into the Rain	Music for Pleasure	Polydor Records	check				
1982	"The Story of the Blues" (single)	Wah!	Eternal Records	check				
1982	Sulk	Associates	Beggars Banquet Records	check				
1982	The Golden Age of Wireless	Thomas Dolby	Venice in Peril		check			
1982	Borrowed Time	Diamond Head	MCA Records	check	check			
1982	A Kiss in the Dreamhouse	Siouxsie and the Banshees	Polydor Records		check			
1983	The Sin of Pride	The Undertones	EMI Records	check				
1983	All Wrapped Up	The Undertones	Ardeck Records	check				
1983	What Is Beat?	The Beat	I.R.S. Records	check				
1983	Special Beat Service	The Beat	Go-Feet Records	check				
1983	Hope (I Wish You'd Believe Me) (single)	Wah!	Eternal Records	check				
1983	Technology	The Group	Jive Records	check				
1983	Haunted Cocktails	Intro	MCA Records	check				
1983	Feast	The Creatures	Polydor Records	check				
1983	The Southern Death Cult	Southern Death Cult	Beggars Banquet Records		check			
1983	Right Now (single)	The Creatures	Wonderland	check				
1983	Dear Prudence (cover)	Siouxsie and the Banshees	Wonderland	check				
1983	Nocturne	Siouxsie and the Banshees	Polydor Records	check				
1983	Dark Crash	Music for Pleasure	Polydor Records	check				
1984	The Way We Wah!	Wah!	Eternal Records	check				
1984	Advance Album Sampler	Marc Almond	Phonogram Inc.	check				
1984	"Careless" (single)	Bourgie Bourgie	MCA Records	check				
1984	Lady Christabelle	First Priority	MCA Records	check				
1984	Hyæna	Siouxsie and the Banshees	Polydor Records	check	check			
1984	Vermin in Ermine	Marc Almond	Some Bizzare Records	check				
1985	"Say Goodbye to No One" (single)	The Impossible Dreamers	RCA Records	check				
1985	Arrive Without Travelling	The Three O'Clock	I.R.S. Records	check	check			
1985	The House Is Haunted by the Echo of Your Last Goodbye	Marc Almond	Some Bizzare Records	check				
1985	Stories of Johnny	Marc Almond	Some Bizzare Records	check				
1986	A Woman's Story (Some Songs to Take to the Tomb – Compilation One)	Marc Almond	Virgin Records	check				
1986	Baby, the Stars Shine Bright	Everything but the Girl	Blanco y Negro Records	check	check			
1986	Staring at the Sea	The Cure	Fiction Records	check				
1986	Strange Cruise	Strange Cruise	EMI Records	check				
1986	Cher O'Bowlies – The Pick of the Undertones	The Undertones	EMI Records	check				
1986	Save Me	The Undertones	Ardeck Records	check				
1987
1987	Drop	The Shamen	Communion Label	check				
1987	Long Live the New Flesh	Flesh for Lulu	Beggars Banquet Records	check				
1987	Singles (1984–1987)	Marc Almond	Virgin Records	check				
1987	Mother Fist and Her Five Daughters	Marc Almond	Virgin Records	check	check			
1987	Through the Looking Glass	Siouxsie and the Banshees	Wonderland	check	check			
1987	Desire	Toyah	E.G. Records	check				
1988	Applehead Man	Trip Shakespeare	Gark	check				
1988	Peepshow	Siouxsie and the Banshees	Wonderland	check	check			
1989	Skin (Autogift)	Eat	Fiction Records	check				
1989	You Used To	Distant Cousins	DRO Records	check				
1989	From Under the Hill	And Also the Trees	none	check				
1989	Welcome to the Beautiful South	The Beautiful South	Go! Discs	check				
1989	"Song for Whoever" (single)	The Beautiful South	Go! Discs	check				
1989	Boomerang	The Creatures	Geffen Records	check	check			
1990	I Know You Well	Shack	Ghetto Recording Company	check				
1990	Popera: The Singles Collection	Associates	East West Records	check				
1990	I've Come for my Award	The Beautiful South	Elektra Records	check				
1990	Choke	The Beautiful South	Go! Discs	check				
1990	The La's	The La's	Go! Discs	check				
1990	I Want Too Much	A House	Sire Records	check				
1991	What You See is What You Get	The Beautiful South	Go! Discs	check				
1991	Tell Him	Michel Van Dyke	Chrysalis Records	check				
1991	Jealousy	Michel Van Dyke	Chrysalis Records	check				
1992	4-Cut Sampler	Siouxsie & The Banshees	Geffen Records	check				
1992	Lovely	The Senators	Go! Discs	check		check		
1992	Port in my Storm	The Senators	Go! Discs	check				
1992	Warm Hatred	Distant Cousins	Virgin Records	check				
1992	A Virgin's Tale – Volume I	Marc Almond	Virgin Records	check				
1992	A Virgin's Tale – Volume II	Marc Almond	Virgin Records	check				
1992	Twice Upon a Time: The Singles	Siouxsie and the Banshees	Polydor Records	check				
1992	Once Around the World	The Stunning	Solid Records	check				
1993	"That's Just Like Love" (single)	Black	Polydor Records	check				
1993	Are We Having Fun Yet?	Black	Polydor Records	check				
1993	"Don't Take the Silence Too Hard" (single)	Black	Polydor Records	check				
1994	"Love Me for a Reason" (cover)	Boyzone	Polydor Records	check				
1994	Interview And Tracks From Amplified Heart Plus A Ten Year Retrospective Of Songs	Everything but the Girl	Atlantic Records	check				
1994	Split	Lush	4AD	check	check			
1994	Beautiful Morning	Sensation	One Little Indian Records	check				
1994	Burger Habit	Sensation	One Little Indian Records	check				
1994	Mute	Catchers	Setanta Records	check		check		
1995	The Sound Of... McAlmont & Butler	McAlmont & Butler	Hut Records	check				
1995	Yes (single)	McAlmont & Butler	Hut Records	check				
1995	Carry on Up the Charts: The Best of the Beautiful South	The Beautiful South	Go! Discs	check				
1995	Child Star	Marc Almond	Mercury Records	check				
1995	Fantastic Star	Marc Almond	Some Bizzare Records	check				
1996	Our Colander Eyes	Alison Moyet	Columbia Records	check				
1996	No One Speaks	Geneva	Vox Magazine	check				
1996	Last Night	Lush	Reprise Records	check				
1996	When My Arms Wrap You Round	Briana Corrigan	East West Records	check				
1996	Strawberries & Cream	Boutique	Trade 2	check				
1996	I've Told You Before	Boutique	Trade 2	check				
1996	Everything Must Go	Manic Street Preachers	Epic Records	check				
1996	Best of Heatwave: Always & Forever	Heatwave	Epic Records		check			
1996	No More Apologies	A House	Setanta Records	check				
1997	A Bestiary Of	The Creatures	Polydor Records	check	check	check		
1997	Yesterday Tomorrow Today	Northern Uproar	Heavenly Recordings	check				
1997	How Free	Don	London Recordings	check				
1997	Heads High	Don	London Recordings	check				
1997	White on Blonde	Texas	Mercury Records	check				
1997	Further	Geneva	Nude Records	check				
1997	"Best Regrets" (single)	Geneva	Nude Records	check				
1997	Fluff	Atomic Swing	Sonet Records	check				
1998	"The Everlasting"	Manic Street Preachers	Epic Records	check				
1998	This Is My Truth Tell Me Yours	Manic Street Preachers	Epic Records	check				
1998	Theaudience	Theaudience	Mercury Records	check				
1998	Heart as Big as Liverpool	The Mighty Wah!	Columbia Records	check				
1998	Only Forever	Puressence	Island Records	check				
1999	Jumpcut	Man Jumping	Shaping the Invisible	check				
1999	Best of Diamond Head	Diamond Head	Epic Records	check	check			
1999	The Man Who	Travis	Independiente	check				
1999	Yeah	The Wannadies	RCA Records	check				
2000	To Hull And Back (The Past And A Preview Of Painting It Red)	The Beautiful South	Universal Music Canada	check				
2000	Abbey Road Live	Colin Vearncombe	Nero Schwarz	check				
2000	Si Je M'Abandonne À Toi	Noa	Metheny Group Productions	check				
2000	Blue Touches Blue	Noa	Metheny Group Productions	check				
2000	True Confessions (Singles = A's & B's)	The Undertones	Ardeck Records	check				
2000	All That You Can't Leave Behind	U2	Universal Music Group	check		check		
2000	The Greatest Hits	Texas	Mercury Records	check				
2000	Songs of Strength & Heartbreak	The Mighty Wah!	Castle Music	check				
2001	The Safety in Numbers EP	Idoru	Blanco y Negro Music	check				
2001	Home Movies	Everything but the Girl	Blanco y Negro Records	check				
2001	Ciao! Best of Lush	Lush	4AD	check				
2001	Know Your Enemy	Manic Street Preachers	Epic Records	check	check	check		
2001	Now and Forever: The Andrew Lloyd Webber Box Set	Andrew Lloyd Webber	Really Useful Records		check			
2001	Greatest Hits	The Cure	Universal Music Group	check				
2001	Listen and Learn	Screaming Orphans	Warner Music Group	check				
2001	Solid Bronze – Great Hits	The Beautiful South	Go! Discs	check				
2002	Wasting My Time	Kosheen	Moksha Records	check		check		
2002	Tracks from the '90s	U2	Interscope Records	check		check		
2002	Dive In	Darius	Mercury Records	check				
2002	The Way We Were: The Best Of A House 04.85–02.97	A House	Setanta Records	check				
2002	Loss	Mull Historical Society	Blanco y Negro Records	check		check		
2002	Under the Waves	Lorien	Instant Karma	check				
2002	The Best of Siouxsie and the Banshees	Siouxsie and the Banshees	Universal Music Group	check				
2002	Forever Delayed	Manic Street Preachers	Epic Records	check				
2002	Like the Deserts Miss the Rain	Everything but the Girl	Rhino Records	check				
2002	We're on the Ball (single)	Ant & Dec	Columbia Records	check			check	
2002	a1	a1	Columbia Records	check				
2002	Make It Good	a1	Columbia Records	check				
2002	Arrive Without Travelling/Ever After	The Three O'Clock	Collectors' Choice Music	check				
2002	The Best of 1990–2000	U2	Island Records	check		check		
2003	Kick Up the Fire, and Let the Flames Break Loose	The Cooper Temple Clause	Morning Records	check				
2003	Blind Pilots	The Cooper Temple Clause	Morning Records	check				
2003	"There by the Grace of God" (single)	Manic Street Preachers	Epic Records	check				
2003	Lipstick Traces	Manic Street Preachers	Sony Music	check				
2003	Life for Rent	Dido	BMG	check				
2003	Another Day	Lene Marlin	Virgin Records	check				
2003	Singles	Travis	Independiente	check				
2004	How to Dismantle an Atomic Bomb	U2	Island Records	check				
2004	Crazy World	Aslan	EMI Music Ireland	check		check		
2004	Downside Up	Siouxsie and the Banshees	Polydor Records	check				
2004	Join the Dots: B-Sides & Rarities 1978–2001 (The Fiction Years)	The Cure	Fiction Records	check		check		
2004	Don't Leave Home (single)	Dido	Cheeky Records	check				
2004	Morning Hero	Izabo	BMG			check		
2005	Love (cover)	The Cure	Amnesty International	check		check		
2005	There's One Thing	Robert Post	Mercury Records	check		check		
2005	Robert Post	Robert Post	Mercury Records	check		check		
2005	Red Book	Texas	Mercury Records			check		
2005	Forever Faithless – The Greatest Hits	Faithless	Sony BMG	check		check		
2005	No Pain No Gain: Live 1991	Revenge	LTM Recordings					
2006	Driveblind	Driveblind	Geffen Records	check				
2006	Heaven	Lorraine	Columbia Records	check				
2006	Renaissance 3D	Faithless	Renaissance Recordings	check				
2006	Sleep (single)	Texas	Mercury Records			check		
2007	Time Machine (The Best of Shack)	Shack	Sour Mash	check				
2007	"My Generation" (cover)	The Zimmers	Go! Discs	check				
2007	Soup	The Beautiful South; The Housemartins	Mercury Records	check				
2007	The Boy with No Name	Travis	Sony BMG	check	check			
2007	8060	Xanther	Xanther Records					
2008	The Priests	The Priests	Epic Records	check			check	
2008	An Anthology	The Undertones	Union Square Music	check				
2008	I Know You're Married But I've Got Feelings Too	Martha Wainwright	MapleMusic Recordings	check		check		
2009	The Best Of 1980–2000	U2	Island Records	check		check		
2009	Harmony	The Priests	Epic Records	check			check	
2009	Camilla Kerslake	Camilla Kerslake	Mercury Records	check			check	
2010	If All The Flies Were One Fly: A Collection Of Rare And Unreleased Dentistry 1984–1995	The Dentists	Bedroom 14	check				
2010	The Very Best of Glenn Miller	Glenn Miller	Sony Music	check				
2010	Those Thousand Seas	Claire Tchaikowski	Grá Mór Phonic Records	check				
2010	Noel	The Priests	Epic Records	check		check		
2010	La Voce	Russell Watson	Epic Records	check				
2010	Callin' All	The La's	Polydor Records	check				
2010	Too Hot to Handle/Central Heating	Heatwave	Edsel Records		check			
2012	Voice from Assisi	Friar Alessandro	Decca Records	check				
2012	The Light Between Us	Scouting for Girls	Epic Records	check				
2012	This Is Christmas	Katherine Jenkins	Warner Records	check				
2013	Dreamchaser	Sarah Brightman	Decca Records	check		check	check	
2013	Greatest Hits	Dido	RCA Records	check				
2014	The Complete Studio Recordings	The Beat	Edsel Records	check				
2014	Origami	Lush	4AD	check				
2018	Torn Down	The Cure	Polydor Records	check				
2020	West Bank Songs 1978–1989 (A Best Of)	The Undertones	BMG	check				

== Compilation albums ==
Year	Title	Artist	Song	Label	Producer	Engineer	Mixing	Arranger	Ref(s).
1981	Britannia Waives the Rules	Associates	A Matter of Gender	Stunn	check				
1981	Dancin' Master	The Beat	Hit It!	NME	check				
1982	Dance 2 It Vol. 1	The Cure	Primary	A&M Records	check				
1982	Fruitcakes & Furry Collars	Marc Almond	Indigo Blue	Record Mirror	check				
1989	Smash Hits Party 89	The Beautiful South	"Song for Whoever"	Dover Records	check				
1989	Now That's What I Call Music 15	The Beautiful South	"Song for Whoever"	EMI Records	check				
1990	Indie Top Video (Take Three)	Distant Cousins	You Used To	Picture Music International	check				
1990	Now That's What I Call Music! 18	The Beautiful South	A Little Time	EMI Records	check				
1990	The Awards 1990	The Beautiful South	"Song for Whoever"	Telstar Records	check				
1990	Now That's What I Call Music! 1980	The Cure	A Forest	Universal Music Group, Sony Music	check				
1990	Follow Our Trax, Vol. 5: Detour Over the Edge	Associates	Club Country	Warner Bros. Records	check				
1991	Q The Album Volume One	The Beautiful South	Let Love Speak Up Itself	Telstar Records	check				
1991	Hit Fascination 1/91	The Beautiful South	A Little Time	Top 13 Music-Club	check				
1991	Awesome!!	The Beautiful South	A Little Time	EMI Records	check				
1992	Maximum Bliss	Siouxsie And The Banshees	Peek-A-Boo (Silver Dollar Mix)	Select Magazine	check				
1992	Heart Rock, Vol. 2	The Beautiful South	"Song for Whoever"	BMG	check				
1993	Welcome to the Future 2	Sensation	Beautiful Morning (Fluke's Magimix)	One Little Indian	check				
1993	Now That's What I Call Music 1983	Siouxsie and the Banshees	Dear Prudence	EMI Records	check				
1993	That Loving Feeling Volume VI	The Beautiful South	A Little Time	Dino Entertainment	check				
1993	Deafening Divinities with Aural Affinities: The Beggars Banquet Collection	Southern Death Cult	Moya	Beggars Banquet Records	check				
1994	Best of Indie Top 20	Lush	Hypocrite	Beechwood Music Ltd.	check				
1995	Devolution (Alternative Rock Classics 1975–1985)	The Cure	A Forest	Big Life	check				
1995	The Help Album	Manic Street Preachers	Raindrops Keep Fallin' on My Head (cover)	Go! Discs	check				
1995	The Best... Album in the World...Ever!	McAlmont & Butler	Yes	Virgin Records	check				
1995	The Love Album II	The Beautiful South	A Little Time	Virgin Records	check				
1995	The Best 80's Album In The World...Ever!	The Beautiful South	"Song for Whoever"	Virgin Records	check				
1996	Best of Indie Top 20	Lush	Hypocrite	Beechwood Music	check				
1996	The Best... Album In The World...Ever!	McAlmont & Butler	You Do	Virgin Records	check				
1996	Wild CD/CD-ROM 06	Manic Street Preachers	"Everything Must Go"	Wild Magazine	check				
1996	The '96 Brit Awards	Manic Street Preachers	Raindrops Keep Fallin' on My Head (cover)	Columbia Records	check				
1996	Huge Hits 1996	Manic Street Preachers	"A Design for Life"	Sony Music	check				
1996	Our Friends Electric	Associates	Party Fears Two	Telstar Records	check				
1996	In Bed with Marina	Shack	Al's Vacation	Marina Records		check			
1997	Now That's What I Call Music! 37	Texas	Halo	Virgin Records, EMI Records	check				
1997	The Best...Anthems...Ever!	McAlmont & Butler	Yes	Virgin Records, EMI Records	check				
1997	Once in a Lifetime	The Mighty Wah!	The Story of the Blues	Telstar Records	check				
1997	The Spring Collection '97	Geneva	Into the Blue	Vox Magazine	check				
1998	4AD	Lush	Hypocrite	4AD	check				
1998	1998 The Album	Theaudience	"A Pessimist Is Never Disappointed"	Melody Maker	check				
1998	The Best of Indie Pop	Flesh for Lulu	Postcards from Paradise	Max Music	check				
1998	Now That's What I Call Music! Vol. 39			Universal Music Group, Sony Music	check				
1999	Now That's What I Call Music! 1980: The Millennium Series	The Cure	A Forest	EMI Records	check				
1999	Now That's What I Call Music! 1983: The Millennium Series	Siouxsie and the Banshees	Dear Prudence	Virgin Records	check				
1999	BSE Bangin' Summer Extravaganza	Travis	She's So Strange	Select Magazine	check				
1999	Spring Offensive	Travis	She's So Strange	NME	check				
2000	Dawn Of Electronica – Uncut	Associates	"White Car in Germany"	Uncut Magazine	check				
2000	Unconditionally Guaranteed 2000.4 (Uncut's Guide To The Month's Best Music)	The Mighty Wah!	Disneyland Forever	Uncut Magazine	check				
2000	The 2000 Brit Awards Double Album	Travis	"Why Does It Always Rain on Me?"	Columbia Records	check				
2000	The 2000 Brit Awards Double Album	Manic Street Preachers	"You Stole the Sun from My Heart"	Columbia Records	check				
2000	Tinsel Town	Manic Street Preachers	The Everlasting (Radio edit)	BBC Music	check				
2000	The Best Anthems... Ever! [2000]			EMI Records	check				
2001	The Album	Manic Street Preachers	"You Stole the Sun from My Heart"	Virgin Records	check				
2001	Hut Recordings: 1991-2001	McAlmont & Butler	Yes	Hut Recordings	check				
2002	Alternative Eighties	Associates	"Party Fears Two"	Columbia Records	check				
2002	Electric Dreams (80's Synth Pop Classics)	Associates	"Party Fears Two"	Virgin Records	check				
2002	The Best Bands...Ever!	Travis	Why Does It Always Rain on Me?	Virgin Records	check				
2002	Now Dance 2002 Part Two	A1	"Caught in the Middle"	Virgin Records	check				
2002	World Shut Your Mouth	The Cure	A Forest	Uncut Magazine	check				
2002	Huge Hits 2003 – The Very Best Of Hits	Manic Street Preachers	There by the Grace of God	BMG	check				
2002	Huge Hits 2003 – The Very Best Of Hits	A1	"Caught in the Middle"	BMG	check				
2002	Hits 53	A1	Make It Good	Telstar Records	check				
2002	Hits 53	Ant & Dec	We're on the Ball (single)	Telstar Records	check			check	
2002	The Best Summer Album 2002	A1	"Make It Good"	Warner Music Group	check				
2002	We're a Happy Family: A Tribute to Ramones	U2	Beat on the Brat (cover)	Columbia Records	check				
2003	Live Forever (The Best of Britpop)	Manic Street Preachers	"Everything Must Go"	Virgin Records	check				
2003	Hot City Nights	Texas	Halo	Columbia Records	check				
2003	Rock'N'Roll Riot (Vol 1 Kicking Off!)	The Cooper Temple Clause	The Same Mistakes	NME	check				
2003	The Best of 80s Movies	Flesh for Lulu	I Go Crazy	Universal Music	check				
2004	Ave Marina™	Shack	I Know You Well	Marina Records	check				
2004	Rough Trade Shops: Indiepop	Lush	Hypocrite	Mute Records	check				
2004	Heroes [Sony]			Sony Music	check				
2004	Q Awards: The Album	Travis	Why Does It Always Rain on Me?	EMI	check				
2004	Best of Acoustic	Travis	Why Does It Always Rain on Me?	The Echo Label, V2 Records	check				
2005	The Album	Travis	Why Does It Always Rain on Me?	EMI Records	check				
2005	Make Some Noise EP	The Cure	Love (cover)	Amnesty International	check				
2005	Little Steven's Underground Garage Presents CBGB Forever	U2	Beat on the Brat (cover)	Wicked Cool Records	check				
2005	World's Best Dad – The Ultimate Gift for Dad	Manic Street Preachers	"You Stole the Sun from My Heart"	Sony BMG	check				Liner
2005	12"/80s/2	Associates	Party Fears Two	Family Recordings	check				
2006	England The Album 2006	Ant & Dec	We're on the Ball (single)	Virgin Records	check				
2006	John Peel: Right Time Wrong Speed	The Cure	A Forest	Warner Music TV	check				
2006	Senses Working Overtime (Circa 80)	The Cure	All Cats Are Grey	Rhino Entertainment	check				
2006	Life Less Lived: The Gothic Box	The Cure	Charlotte Sometimes	Rhino Entertainment	check				
2006	Life Less Lived: The Gothic Box	Southern Death Cult	Fatman	Rhino Entertainment	check				
2006	Ave Marina: Ten Years of Marina Records	Shack	I Know You Well	Marina Records	check				
2006	Cavern: The Most Famous Club in the World	Travis	Why Does It Always Rain on Me?	EMI	check				
2006	Headliners: The Ultimate Festival Line-Up	Travis	Closer	BMG		check			
2006	CBGB Forever	U2	Beat on the Brat (cover)	Wicked Cool Records	check				
2006	Mute Audio Documents	Robert Görl	Darling Don't Leave Me	Mute Records	check				
2006	Mute Audio Documents	Robert Görl	A Ist Wieder Da	Mute Records	check				
2007	Make Some Noise – The Amnesty International Campaign To Save Darfur	The Cure	Love (cover)	Amnesty International, Warner Bros. Records	check				
2008	The Edge of the 80's	Associates	Party Fears Two	BMG	check				
2008	The Edge of the 80's	Siouxsie and the Banshees	Dear Prudence	BMG	check				
2009	Match of the Day: The Album	Manic Street Preachers	"A Design for Life"	Sony Music	check				
2009	Hallelujah: Songs of Love, Hope & Inspiration			Sony Music	check				
2009	Essential Great Voices			Sony Music				check	
2010	Passione Vol. 2	The Priests	Plegaria	Sony Music	check			check	
2010	Essential: The 90s	Manic Street Preachers	"A Design for Life"	Sony Music	check				
2011	Anthems Indie	Travis	Why Does It Always Rain on Me?	Ministry of Sound	check				
2012	........Anthems .........Electronic 80s 3	Siouxsie and the Banshees	Dear Prudence	Ministry of Sound	check				
2012	........Anthems .........Electronic 80s 3	Associates	Party Fears Two	Ministry of Sound	check				
2013	The Best of War Child	Manic Street Preachers	Raindrops Keep Fallin' on My Head (Warchild Version) (cover)	Parlophone	check				
2017	101 No.1 Hits	The Beautiful South	A Little Time	Universal Music Catalogue	check				

== Soundtrack mixing ==
Year	Film	Role	Songs and tracks	Ref(s).
1983	A Night in Heaven soundtrack	Producer	"Which Side of the Bed" by The English Beat	liner
1992	Valley of the Stereos	Sound Mixer		
1995	The Doom Generation – Music from the Motion Picture	Producer	"Undertow (The Spooky Mix)" by Lush	liner
2005	Harry Potter and the Goblet of Fire soundtrack	Producer	"Hogwarts' Hymn", "Do the Hippogriff", "This Is the Night"	liner
