= Split (Lush album) =

Studio album by Lush
- Released: 13 June 1994
- Recorded: October – December 1993
- Studios: Rockfield, Wales; Berry House, Sussex; Abbey Road, London
- Genres: Shoegaze; dream pop; noise pop
- Length: 52:06
- Label: 4AD
- Producers: Mike Hedges; Lush

Lush chronology
Spooky (1992)	Split (1994)	Lovelife (1996)

Singles from Split
- 1. "Hypocrite" Released: 30 May 1994; 2. "Desire Lines" Released: 30 May 1994

Split is the second studio album by English rock band Lush, released on 4AD on 13 June 1994 in the United Kingdom and a day later in the US. Unusually, the two singles from the album, "Desire Lines" and "Hypocrite", were both released on the same day: 30 May 1994. Split was reissued by 4AD on CD in July 2001.

== Background and recording ==
Lush chose to work with producer Mike Hedges because they "loved" his work on Sulk by the Associates, A Kiss in the Dreamhouse by Siouxsie and the Banshees, and Seventeen Seconds by the Cure, according to Miki Berenyi. They first recorded at Rockfield in Wales and then mixed at Hedges's house in France, but as Phil King remembered it, "it sounded as flat as a pancake, no dynamics at all". They finally decided to have the entire album remixed by Alan Moulder, because he had already worked with My Bloody Valentine and Ride. Berenyi's verdict was positive, "Alan was brilliant". However, the band members have since described the process of the album's creation as "traumatic" and "agonizing."

== Music and lyrics ==
Stylistically, Split has been described as being in "the space between shoegaze and Britpop, the moonlit zone where guitars and windchimes suddenly had wonderful pop hooks to hang onto." Lyrical themes explored on the album include child abuse, infidelity, voyeurism, and death.

== Packaging ==
The album was released with three different front covers, depending on the format: CD releases pictured four lemons on a red surface with black background, the vinyl versions featured various sticks on a blue surface with a red background, while cassette version had four trolley wheels on a yellow surface with a red background. Both the CD and vinyl covers featured the lyrics of the first two songs on the right side. The cassette version eschewed the lyrics in favour of the personnel listing.

== Reception and legacy ==
Professional ratings
Review scores
Source	Rating
AllMusic	4.5/5 stars
Chicago Sun-Times	2.5/4 stars
Entertainment Weekly	B+
NME	6/10
Pitchfork	8.2/10
Q	4/5 stars
Rolling Stone	4/5 stars
Select	2/5
Uncut	9/10
Vox	8/10

Select's Roy Wilkinson gave the album a negative review, describing it as "mid-paced stuff, flitting between melancholy and listlessness." The review went on to state, "There's nothing wrong with a dose of heavyweight introspection per se. But a pretty deft touch is needed to translate it movingly to the recording studio."

In a retrospective review, Andy Kellman, writing for AllMusic, was far more positive: "Split touches on most forms of emotional turbulence. Not necessarily a comeback but certainly a legitimizing stunner, the record prevented the band from being lost amidst the bunker of form-over-function dream pop bands. Split shattered every negative aspect of those failed acts with flying colors. A fantastic record within any realm." In 2018, Pitchfork ranked the album at number 27 on its list of "The 30 Best Dream Pop Albums". Staff writer Jeremy D. Larson wrote: "Thanks to the meticulous production of Mike Hedges, Split sounds so luxurious and so powerful, the essential sound of Lush. Berenyi and Anderson’s voices sky together in their clearest, most present harmonies. Songs last no longer than they need to, even the ones that stretch to eight minutes. Split is at once grounded and aloft—fiery, poppy, druggy, and alone."

== Track listing ==
No.	Title	Writer(s)	Length
1.	"Light from a Dead Star"	Miki Berenyi	3:15
2.	"Kiss Chase"	Berenyi	3:17
3.	"Blackout"	Emma Anderson	3:06
4.	"Hypocrite"	Berenyi	2:53
5.	"Lovelife"	Anderson	3:56
6.	"Desire Lines"	Anderson	7:37
7.	"The Invisible Man"	Anderson	2:14
8.	"Undertow"	Berenyi	4:57
9.	"Never-Never"	Anderson	8:04
10.	"Lit Up"	Anderson	4:00
11.	"Starlust"	Anderson; Berenyi	4:32
12.	"When I Die"	Anderson	4:17

== Release history ==
Country	Date	Label	Format	Catalogue #
United Kingdom	13 June 1994	4AD	CD	CAD 4011 CD
United Kingdom	13 June 1994	4AD	LP	CAD 4011
United Kingdom	13 June 1994	4AD	Cassette	CAD C 4011
United States	14 June 1994	4AD/Reprise	CD	9 45578-2
Japan	1 July 1994	Nippon Columbia	CD	COCY-78078
Japan	20 March 1996	Nippon Columbia	CD (reissue)	COCY-80093
United Kingdom	2 July 2001	4AD	CD (reissue)	GAD 4011 CD

== Singles ==
- "Hypocrite" (30 May 1994)
  - CD (BAD 4008 CD); 12" vinyl (BAD 4008)
    1. "Hypocrite" – 2:58
    2. "Love at First Sight" – 5:12 (The Gist cover, written by Stuart Moxham)
    3. "Cat's Chorus" – 3:23
    4. "Undertow (Spooky Remix)" – 9:13
  - 7" vinyl (AD 4008)
    1. "Hypocrite" – 2:58
    2. "Cat's Chorus" – 3:23
- "Desire Lines" (30 May 1994)
  - CD (BAD 4010 CD); 12" vinyl (BAD 4010)
    1. "Desire Lines" – 7:29
    2. "White Wood" – 4:14
    3. "Girl's World" – 4:56
    4. "Lovelife (Suga Bullit Remix)" – 8:15
  - 7" vinyl (AD 4010)
    1. "Desire Lines" – 7:29
    2. "Girl's World" – 4:56
- "When I Die" (promo only, June 1994)
  - Radio promo CD (PRO-CD-7048)
    1. "When I Die (Scott Litt Remix)" – 4:20
    2. "Light from a Dead Star (Album Version)" – 3:17
    3. "Lovelife (Album Version)" – 3:57
- "Lovelife" (promo only, 1994)
  - Radio promo CD (PRO-CD-7092)
    1. "Lovelife (Album Version)" – 3:56
    2. "Lovelife (Suga Bullit Remix Edit)" – 5:28
    3. "Lovelife (Suga Bullit Remix)" – 8:15

== Personnel ==
Personnel credits adapted from the album's liner notes.

Lush

- Chris Acland – drums
- Emma Anderson – guitars, vocals
- Miki Berenyi – vocals, guitars
- Phil King – bass

Additional personnel

- Chris Bigg – art direction, design
- Richard Caldicott – photography
- Martin Ditcham – percussion
- Mike Hedges – engineering, production
- Chris Ludwinski – engineering
- Martin McCarrick – string arrangements (6, 12)
- Melodie McDaniel – photography
- Alan Moulder – mix engineering
- Vaughan Oliver – art direction, design
- Lance Phillips – engineering
- Paul Read – engineering
- Audrey Riley – string arrangements (1, 9)
- Curtis Schwartz – engineering
- Ronen Tal – engineering assistance

== Charts ==
Chart (1994)	Peak position
Scottish Albums (Official Charts)	76
UK Albums (Official Charts)	19
UK Independent Albums (OCC)	2
US Billboard 200	195
US Heatseekers Albums (Billboard)	23

Chart (2023)	Peak position
Scottish Albums (Official Charts)	53
