= The Affectionate Punch =

1980 album by the Associates

Studio album by the Associates
- Released: 1 August 1980
- Studio: Morgan Studios (London)
- Genres: Post-punk; new wave; soul
- Length: 41:25
- Label: Fiction
- Producers: Mike Hedges; Chris Parry

The Associates chronology
The Affectionate Punch (1980)	Fourth Drawer Down (1981)

Singles from The Affectionate Punch
- 1. "The Affectionate Punch" Released: 1980; 2. "A" Released: 1981

The Affectionate Punch is the debut studio album by the Scottish post-punk and new wave band the Associates. It was released on 1 August 1980 on the Fiction label.

The song title "Even Dogs in the Wild" became the title of a novel by Scottish mystery writer Ian Rankin, and the song figured briefly in the story.

== Release ==
The Affectionate Punch was released on 1 August 1980. Michael Dempsey and John Murphy featured in promotional shots and the accompanying tour but did not perform on the record. Alan Rankine recalls that the whole album was recorded with only himself, Billy Mackenzie and a session drummer: "it was great fun. We just never stopped and the ideas just came and came and came."

"The Affectionate Punch" and "A" were released as singles to little commercial success.

The cover of the album features Alan Rankine (in the starting position) and Billy MacKenzie (standing) on the running track of Wormwood Scrubs Prison in the White City district of West London.

== Critical reception ==
Professional ratings
Review scores
Source	Rating
AllMusic	4/5 stars
Mojo	4/5 stars
Q	4/5 stars
Record Collector	4/5 stars
Smash Hits	6½/10
Sounds	5/5 stars
Uncut	8/10

Upon its release, The Affectionate Punch was declared "a kind of masterpiece" by Paul Morley of the NME, who described it as "a passionate cabaret soul music, a fulfillment of the European white dance music [David] Bowie was flirting with back then."

Retrospective reviews have also been favourable, with BBC Music reviewer Chris Jones writing, "Few bands today would dare to be so audacious".

== Remix and reworkings ==
The Affectionate Punch

Studio album by The Associates
- Released: 1982
- Recorded: 1980; 1982
- Studios: Morgan Studios, London (original recording); Basing Street Studios, London and Odyssey Studios, London (new recordings)
- Label: Fiction
- Producers: Mark Arthurworry; The Associates

The Associates chronology
Sulk (1982)	The Affectionate Punch (1982)	Perhaps (1985)

Singles from The Affectionate Punch
- 1. "A Matter of Gender" Released: 1982

The album was remixed and re-released in 1982 by order of the Associates' new record company Warner Bros. The remixed record retained all the old tracks but was given typical '80s production values such as new synthesizers as well as some re-recorded vocals by Billy Mackenzie. Both MacKenzie and Rankine expressed dissatisfaction with the results. For years this was the only version available on CD, as the master tapes for the original had been lost. However, a duplicate was later found and the album was reissued by Virgin in 2005.

The remixed version of "A Matter of Gender" was released as a single in 1982.

In 2019 and 2020 material from the album was performed live in Scotland by Band A with Audrey Redpath on vocals.

== Track listing ==
All tracks are written by Alan Rankine and Billy Mackenzie.

Side A
No.	Title	Length
1.	"The Affectionate Punch"	3.30
2.	"Amused as Always"	4.20
3.	"Logan Time"	4.12
4.	"Paper House"	4.54
5.	"Transport to Central"	5.02

Side B
No.	Title	Length
1.	"A Matter of Gender"	4.30
2.	"Even Dogs in the Wild"	3.23
3.	"Would I... Bounce Back"	3.59
4.	"Deeply Concerned"	3.38
5.	"A"	3.57

2005 CD reissue bonus tracks
No.	Title	Length
11.	"You Were Young"	4.04
12.	"Janice"	2.35
13.	"Boys Keep Swinging (Mono)"	3.40
14.	"Mona Property Girl"	3.27

=== 1982 Remixed Version ===
Side A
No.	Title	Length
1.	"Amused As Always"	4.20
2.	"The Affectionate Punch"	4.18
3.	"A Matter of Gender"	4.27
4.	"Would I... Bounce Back"	3.57
5.	"A"	3.49

Side B
No.	Title	Length
1.	"Logan Time"	4.13
2.	"Paper House"	4.54
3.	"Deeply Concerned"	4.03
4.	"Even Dogs in the Wild"	3.09
5.	"Transport to Central"	4.34

== Personnel ==
The Associates

- Billy Mackenzie – vocals, design concept
- Alan Rankine – guitar, bass, keyboards, other instruments

Additional personnel

- Robert Smith – backing vocals on "The Affectionate Punch" and "Even Dogs in the Wild"
- Nigel Glockler – drums

Technical

- Chris Parry – production
- Mike Hedges – production, engineering
- Mike J. Dutton – engineering assistance
- Graham and Flood – "strong tea"
- Cliff Lewis, David Baker, Gary Bidmead, Louis Austin, Nigel Mills, Paul Fisher, Phill Brown – re-recording and remixing engineers
- Bill Smith – sleeve artwork

== Charts ==
Chart performance for The Affectionate Punch
Chart (1981)	Peak position
New Zealand Albums (RMNZ)	23
Chart (2016)	Peak position
Scottish Albums (Official Charts)	77
UK Independent Albums (Official Charts)	25
