= Party Fears Two =

Single by the Associates

from the album Sulk
- B-side: "It's Better This Way"
- Released: 26 February 1982
- Recorded: 1981
- Studio: Playground Studios (London)
- Genre: Pop-soul
- Length: 4:05 (7-inch single version); 4:52 (album version); 5:04 (remix); 5:38 (12-inch extended version)
- Label: Associates; Beggars Banquet; WEA International (Europe)
- Songwriter(s): Billy Mackenzie; Alan Rankine
- Producer(s): Mike Hedges

The Associates singles chronology
"White Car in Germany" (1981)	"Party Fears Two" (1982)	"Club Country" (1982)

Music video
- "Party Fears Two" on YouTube

"Party Fears Two" is a song by the Scottish post-punk and pop band the Associates, written by Billy Mackenzie and Alan Rankine. It was included on their second studio album Sulk (1982) and released as both a 7-inch and 12-inch single with the preceding track on the album, "It's Better This Way" as its B-side.

== Release ==
The song was originally written in 1979, around a piano riff, but both Alan Rankine and Billy Mackenzie initially rejected it. Rankine stated: "This was the tail-end of punk and it was too tuneful, too pretty. It wasn't hip at that time." In an interview with Smash Hits magazine, Billy Mackenzie explained the origin of the song title, "My wee brother was at a party watching two girls who wanted to come in. They were smashing windows and attempting to kick the door in with their stiletto heels, which he admired, so he christened them the Party Fears Two and I pinched the title from him."

The lyrics begin and end with a reference to a brother but, like most of Mackenzie's lyrics, the words only seem to suggest a mood rather than give any precise meaning. Like a number of songs by Mackenzie, "Party Fears Two" finds the singer anxious about appearances, and uncertain of himself. Alan Rankine recalls that Mackenzie spent two years getting the lyrics right for this song. The end of the song features the sound of three cups being smashed and Mackenzie spitting out his chewing gum.

The song became their first Top 20 and best-known hit, peaking at No. 9 on the UK Singles Chart, as well as charting in Ireland at No. 16.

The band performed the song on the BBC record chart television programme Top of the Pops.

== Legacy ==
"Party Fears Two" has been covered by several artists, including the Divine Comedy, Heaven 17, King Creosote and Dan Bryk.

Between May 1982 and July 1993 the track was also the theme music for BBC Radio 4's long-running comedy satire programme Week Ending.

== Track listing ==
All tracks are written by Billy Mackenzie and Alan Rankine.

Side A
No.	Title	Length
1.	"Party Fears Two"	4:05

Side B
No.	Title	Length
2.	"It's Better This Way"	3:39

== Charts ==
Chart (1982)	Peak position
Ireland (IRMA)	16
UK Singles (OCC)	9
