= Breakfast (Associates song) =

Single by the Associates

from the album Perhaps
- Released: January 1985
- Genre: Pop
- Length: 5:33
- Label: WEA
- Songwriter(s): Billy Mackenzie
- Producer(s): Martin Rushent

The Associates singles chronology
"Waiting for the Loveboat" (1984)	"Breakfast" (1985)	"Take Me to the Girl" (1985)

Music video
- "Breakfast" on YouTube

"Breakfast" is a song by the Scottish pop band the Associates, released as both a 7" and 12" single from their third studio album, Perhaps (1985). Produced by Martin Rushent, "Breakfast" was released as the third single from the album, peaking at No. 49 on the UK singles chart, and No. 36 on the Dutch Single Top 100 chart.

The 12" version of the single features a cover version of the Simon Dupree and the Big Sound 1967 song "Kites" as its B-side. The band had previously released a version of "Kites" as a single under the name of 39 Lyon Street in 1981, but this is a re-recorded version exclusive to the single.

== Track listing ==
7" single

1. "Breakfast"
2. "Breakfast Alone"

12" single

1. "Breakfast"
2. "Breakfast Alone"
3. "Kites"

== Charts ==
Chart (1985)	Peak position
UK Singles (OCC)	49
Netherlands (Single Top 100)	36
