= Perhaps (album) =

Studio album by the Associates
- Released: 8 February 1985
- Recorded: 1983–1985
- Genres: Pop; alternative dance; dance-pop
- Length: 55:42
- Label: WEA
- Producers: Martyn Ware; Martin Rushent; Dave Allen; Greg Walsh

The Associates chronology
Sulk (1982)	Perhaps (1985)	Wild and Lonely (1990)

Singles from Perhaps
- 1. "Those First Impressions" Released: 1984; 2. "Waiting for the Loveboat" Released: 1984; 3. "Breakfast" Released: 1985

Perhaps is the third studio album by the Scottish post-punk and pop band the Associates, released on 8 February 1985 by WEA. It is their first album without founding member, keyboardist and guitarist Alan Rankine.

== Background ==
With the departure of Alan Rankine and bassist Michael Dempsey, the Associates were effectively a Billy Mackenzie solo project for this album. Mackenzie started work with Steve Reid, a guitarist from Dundee and L. Howard Hughes, an accomplished keyboardist in late 1982 after the departure of Rankine and came up with an album's worth of material.

== Recording ==
The recording sessions were chaotic, and the resulting album was deemed unreleasable by Warner Music Group, who demanded further work be carried out on the project. The master tapes for this version went missing over the Christmas period in 1982 (allegedly hidden by MacKenzie due to his own dissatisfaction with the record). The album was restarted from scratch and was finally finished after a further two years in early 1985, featuring four different producers and at a total final cost of approximately £250,000 to complete, an uncommonly major expense, even for a major label record, at that time.

== Release ==
Perhaps was released on 9 February 1985. The album was a commercial failure in comparison to their previous releases, peaking at No. 23 on the UK Albums Chart but only selling around 40,000 copies, putting Billy Mackenzie in significant debt to Warner Music Group. However, it was their only album to chart in the Netherlands, peaking at No. 29 on the Dutch Albums Chart.

The first single taken from the album was "Those First Impressions" which reached No. 43 on the UK singles chart, "Waiting for the Loveboat" peaked at No. 53, and "Breakfast" turned out to be their last Top 50 hit, peaking at No. 49. "Breakfast" was also their sole showing on the Dutch Single Top 100 chart, peaking at 36.

For years Perhaps was only available on vinyl and cassette. However, due to the reissue program of Associates material after Mackenzie's death, it was re-released along with the unreleased studio album The Glamour Chase in a double CD package in 2002. The bonus instrumentals included on the original cassette release were not included.

On 3 January 2020, it was announced via the Super Deluxe Edition website that a completely new remastered 'deluxe' edition of the album was to be released via pre order via Cherry Red Records on 31 January 2020 marking the first ever stand alone CD release of the album. This two-CD reissue features the original 10-track album on CD 1 along with the four cassette-only instrumentals from 1985. The second disc includes what the label describe as "all the related bonus tracks for which master tapes still exist". These comprise extended versions, edits, B-sides and instrumentals. 11 tracks are new to CD. This deluxe edition comes as a digipak with a 20-page booklet, with sleeve notes courtesy of Andy Davis.

== Critical reception ==
Professional ratings
Review scores
Source	Rating
AllMusic	3/5 stars
Smash Hits	8/10

Trouser Press wrote "To write it off with a snide 'perhaps not' would be a cheap shot, but more than generous", calling it "undanceable dance music with a few ho-hum twists. The lyrics include strange, gratuitous, incomprehensible non sequiturs; the music is at best uninvolving, even if you listen for sheer sound and ignore the pose."

== Track listing ==
All tracks are written by Billy Mackenzie, except where noted.

Side A
No.	Title	Writer(s)	Length
1.	"Those First Impressions"		4:43
2.	"Waiting for the Loveboat"		6:56
3.	"Perhaps"		6:33
4.	"Schampout"		6:03
5.	"Helicopter Helicopter"	music: Steve Reid	4:08

Side B
No.	Title	Writer(s)	Length
1.	"Breakfast"		5:33
2.	"Thirteen Feelings"	music: Steve Reid	4:39
3.	"The Stranger in Your Voice"	music: Steve Reid	6:17
4.	"The Best of You"	music: Mackenzie, Steve Reid	5:37
5.	"Don't Give Me That 'I Told You So' Look"	music: Steve Reid	5:13
Total length:			55:42

Cassette issues included instrumental versions of "Perhaps", "Thirteen Feelings", "The Stranger in Your Voice" and "Breakfast" (titled "Breakfast Alone")

=== 2020 Deluxe CD Issue ===
Disc one
No.	Title	Length
1.	"Those First Impressions"	4:43
2.	"Waiting for the Loveboat"	6:56
3.	"Perhaps" (Dave Allen remix)	6:33
4.	"Schampout"	6:03
5.	"Helicopter Helicopter"	4:08
6.	"Breakfast"	5:33
7.	"Thirteen Feelings"	4:39
8.	"The Stranger in Your Voice"	6:17
9.	"The Best of You" (Billy Mackenzie & Dave Allen remix)	5:37
10.	"Don't Give Me That 'I Told You So' Look"	5:13
11.	"Perhaps" (Instrumental – Bonus track)	7:11
12.	"Breakfast Alone" (Instrumental – Bonus track)	5:45
13.	"Thirteen Feelings" (Instrumental – Bonus track)	4:37
14.	"The Stranger in Your Voice" (Instrumental – Bonus track)	6:19

Disc two
No.	Title	Length
1.	"Those First Impressions" (Extended version)	8:06
2.	"Waiting for the Loveboat" (Single version)	4:26
3.	"Waiting for the Loveboat" (Extended version)	8:16
4.	"Waiting for the Loveboat" (Slight Return)	4:17
5.	"Perhaps Perhaps"	4:15
6.	"Schampout" (Edit)	4:13
7.	"Breakfast" (Single version)	4:24
8.	"Breakfast" (Edit)	5:04
9.	"Kites"	5:52
10.	"Take Me to the Girl" (Single version)	4:25
11.	"Take Me to the Girl" (12" mix)	6:30
12.	"Take Me to the Girl" (Instrumental)	4:23
13.	"The Girl That Took Me"	4:49

== Personnel ==
Credits are adapted from the Perhaps liner notes.

- Billy Mackenzie – vocals
- Steve Reid – guitar; backing vocals on "Perhaps"
- L. Howard Hughes – keyboards; backing vocals on "Perhaps"
- Roberto Soave – bass guitar on "Thirteen Feelings", "The Stranger in Your Voice" and "The Best of You"
- Steve Goulding – drums on "Schampout" and "Helicopter Helicopter"
- Gaspar Lawal – percussion on "Schampout"
- Jim Russell – extra percussion on "Schampout"
- Ian McIntosh – guitar on "Those First Impressions"
- Simon House – electric violin on "Perhaps"
- Alan Whetton – saxophone on "Waiting for the Loveboat"
- Eddi Reader – guest lead vocals on "The Best of You"
- Christine Beveridge – backing vocals on "Perhaps"
- Martyn Ware – backing vocals on "Perhaps"
- Lynton Naiff – string arrangements on "Breakfast" and "Thirteen Feelings"

Production and artwork

- Martin Rushent – production (tracks A2, B1–B4)
- Dave Allen – production (tracks A4, A5, B5)
- Martyn Ware and Greg Walsh – production (tracks A1, A3)
- Achim Elsner – mastering engineer
- Richard Haughton — photography

== Charts ==
Chart performance for Perhaps
Chart (1985)	Peak position
Dutch Albums (Album Top 100)	29
UK Albums (Official Charts)	23
Chart (2020)	Peak position
Scottish Albums (Official Charts)	42
UK Independent Albums (Official Charts)	20
