= Wild and Lonely =

Studio album by the Associates
- Released: 24 March 1990
- Genre: Dance-pop; synth-pop; Eurodisco
- Length: 47:17
- Label: Circa
- Producer: Julian Mendelsohn; Billy Mackenzie

The Associates chronology
Perhaps (1985)	Wild and Lonely (1990)	The Glamour Chase (2002)

Singles from Wild and Lonely
- 1. "Fever" Released: April 1990; 2. "Fire to Ice" Released: August 1990; 3. "Just Can't Say Goodbye" Released: January 1991

Wild and Lonely is the fourth studio album by the Scottish act the Associates, whose sole member by this point was singer/songwriter Billy Mackenzie. The album was released on 24 March 1990 by AVL/Virgin subsidiary Circa Records, a label MacKenzie had signed to after WEA/Warner rejected the fourth Associates album The Glamour Chase (with only MacKenzie's cover of Blondie's "Heart of Glass" emerging from this album while under contract to WEA, when it was released as a single and put on the Vaultage From The Electric Lighting Station compilation). Wild and Lonely was produced by Australian record producer Julian Mendelsohn, it peaked at No. 71 on the UK Albums Chart. Three singles were released from the album: "Fever", "Fire to Ice" and "Just Can't Say Goodbye", all of which failed to chart in the UK Top 40, peaking at numbers 81, 92 and 79 respectively.

== Critical reception ==
Professional ratings
Review scores
Source	Rating
AllMusic	2/5 stars
Entertainment Weekly	D+

Wild and Lonely was poorly received by critics.

Ira Robbins, writing for Entertainment Weekly, wrote "Scotland's Associates have ended a lengthy recording hiatus with a glossy, shallow album that sounds seriously out of step. Where most high-tech dance-pop now follows the soothing groove of Soul II Soul, the Associates — more precisely, singer-songwriter Billy Mackenzie plus a load of session players — cling to a dramatic delivery and chattering, generally overloaded arrangements." In a retrospective review for AllMusic, critic Ned Raggett wrote, "There's some of the same relative musical ennui, where everything is perfectly pleasant but rarely striking. Even more distressing, more than once, said music is little more than late-'80s glossy yup-funk that is singularly unappealing in its boredom, often saved only by Mackenzie's performing bravura and nice production touches [...] Happily, the worse moments don't define the album, and when at its best, Wild and Lonely serves up a fine selection of new Mackenzie classics."

== Track listing ==
All tracks are written by Billy Mackenzie.

Side A
No.	Title	Length
1.	"Fire to Ice"	4:35
2.	"Fever"	4:49
3.	"People We Meet"	4:25
4.	"Just Can't Say Goodbye"	5:33
5.	"Calling All Around the World"	4:20

Side B
No.	Title	Length
6.	"Where There's Love"	4:44
7.	"Something's Got to Give"	4:53
8.	"Strasbourg Square"	4:41
9.	"Ever Since That Day"	4:48
10.	"Wild and Lonely"	4:29
Total length:		47:17

== Personnel ==
Credits are adapted from the Wild and Lonely liner notes.

Musicians

- Billy MacKenzie – vocals
- Blair Booth – keyboards, strings, programming, vocals
- Philipp Erb – keyboards, strings, programming
- Gary Maughan – keyboards, programming
- L. Howard Hughes – piano, strings
- Mimi Izumi Kobayashi – piano
- Chester Kamen – guitar
- J.J. Belle – guitar
- Mark Rutherford – guitar
- Guy Pratt – bass guitar
- Kevin Hutchison – bass guitar
- Danny Cummings – percussion
- Moritz von Oswald – percussion
- Malcolm Duncan – saxophone
- Neil Sidwell – saxophone
- Martin Drover – trumpet
- Lennie Costa – bouzouki
- Anne Dudley – strings
- Gavyn Wright – strings
- Carol Kenyon – backing vocals
- Carroll Thompson – backing vocals
- Juliet Roberts – backing vocals

Production and artwork

- Julian Mendelsohn – producer
- Billy MacKenzie – producer, sleeve design
- Ren Swan – engineer
- Richard Haughton – photography
- Colin Williams – painting

== Charts ==
Chart	Peak position
UK Albums (OCC)	71
