= Music for Pleasure (band) =

English new wave band

- Origin: Leeds, England
- Genres: New wave; post-punk; synth-pop
- Years active: 1979–1985
- Labels: Rockburgh; Rage; Polydor; Whirlpool
- Past members: Mark Copson; Martin King; Christopher Oldroyd; Alan Peace; Ivor Roberts; Sean Wheatley; David Whitaker

Music for Pleasure were a new wave band from Leeds, England, active in the first half of the 1980s.

Music for Pleasure were founded in 1979 by Martin King (bass guitar), Alan Peace (lead vocal), Sean Wheatley (drums) and David Whitaker (keyboards). The band were originally signed to Rockburgh Records and contributed the song "The Human Factor" to Rockburgh's seminal Northern bands compilation Hicks from the Sticks (1980). In 1980, Peace and Wheatley were replaced by Mark Copson (lead vocal) and Christopher Oldroyd (drums – formerly a member of fellow Leeds band Girls at Our Best!). This line-up released a couple of singles on the indie label Rage Records – a re-recorded version of "The Human Factor" (1980) and the John Leckie produced "Fuel to the Fire" (1981).

King was replaced by Ivor Roberts (bass guitar) in 1982, and Music for Pleasure then signed to Polydor Records. The first Polydor release was the single "Switchback" (1982) produced by Mike Hedges, followed by the band's first album Into the Rain (1982) which was co-produced by Hedges and the band. The band released two more singles from the album, "Light" (1982) and a re-recorded version of "Time" (1983), followed by the Hedges produced single "Dark Crash" (1983), before being dropped by Polydor.

Without having a record deal, Music for Pleasure continued to release records on their own Whirlpool label, the Colin Richardson co-produced single "Disconnection" (1984), the John Porter produced EP Chrome Hit Corrosion (1984) and the album Blacklands (1985). However, following the release of Blacklands the band disbanded.

Keyboard player Whitaker went on to join the Danse Society (1985–1986), while drummer Oldroyd appeared on Red Lorry Yellow Lorry's second album Paint Your Wagon (1987).

== Discography ==
=== Albums ===
- Into the Rain (1982)
- Blacklands (1985)

=== Singles ===
- "The Human Factor" (1980)
- "Fuel to the Fire" (1981)
- "Switchback" (1982)
- "Light" (1982)
- "Time" (1983)
- "Dark Crash" (1983)
- "Disconnection" (1984)

=== EPs ===
- Chrome Hit Corrosion (1984)

=== Compilation appearances ===
- Hicks from the Sticks (1980)
- Off the Street (1993)

All discography information from Discogs.
