= Into the Rain =

Studio album by Music for Pleasure
- Released: 1982
- Genre: New wave
- Length: 36:28
- Label: Polydor
- Producer: Mike Hedges/Music for Pleasure

Music for Pleasure chronology
| Into the Rain (1982) | Blacklands (1985) |

Singles from Into the Rain
- 1. "Switchback" Released: 1982; 2. "Light" Released: 1982; 3. "Time" Released: 1983

Professional ratings
Review scores
| Source | Rating |
|---|---|
| Sounds | 4.5/5 stars |

Into the Rain is the first album by Music for Pleasure and was released in 1982.

== Release ==
"Switchback" is the first single taken from Into the Rain. It was released in 1982. The second single, "Light", released in 1982. The third single, "Time", was released in 1983.

== Track listing ==
=== Polydor Records LP: POLS 1070 ===
All tracks are written by Mark Copson, Christopher Oldroyd, Ivor Roberts and David Whitaker, except where noted.

Side A
| No. | Title | Length |
|---|---|---|
| 1. | "Light" | 3:35 |
| 2. | "Switchback" | 3:24 |
| 3. | "Nostalgia" | 3:19 |
| 4. | "Time" | 3:27 |
| 5. | "New Day" | 5:18 |
| Total length: | | 19:03 |

Side B
| No. | Title | Writer(s) | Length |
|---|---|---|---|
| 1. | "Lost Detail" | | 3:07 |
| 2. | "Winterscene" | | 3:25 |
| 3. | "Aim to Life" | Copson, Martin King, Oldroyd, Whitaker | 2:58 |
| 4. | "Warehouse" | | 2:53 |
| 5. | "Underworld" | | 5:02 |
| Total length: | | | 17:25 |

== Personnel ==
- Mark Copson - vocals
- Christopher Oldroyd - drums and percussion
- Ivor Roberts - bass guitar
- David Whitaker - keyboards and synthesizers

== Production ==
- Mike Hedges/Music for Pleasure - producer
- Graham Carmichael - assistant engineer
- Rob O'Connor/Stylorouge - sleeve
- Tony Stone Associates - photo
