= Richard Caldicott =

Richard Caldicott (born 1962, Leicester, England) is an interdisciplinary artist who lives and works in London, England. After achieving global recognition as a photographer in the 1990s for a series of abstract photographs he took of Tupperware products, Caldicott embarked on a process of expanding his body of work, adding painting, drawing, inkjet printing and photogram to his studio practice.

== Education and awards ==
Caldicott attended the College of Art and Design at Loughborough University, Leicestershire, England, in 1980–81. He received his Bachelor of Arts degree in 1984 from Middlesex Polytechnic (now Middlesex University) in London, and earned his Master of Arts degree from the Royal College of Arts (RCA) in London in 1987. From 1988 through 1992 he was a Research Fellow at the RCA. While studying at the RCA, Caldicott was the recipient of the Venice Studio Award in 1985, and the Cité International des Arts – Paris Studio Award in 1986. In 1991, he was a recipient of an artist's grant from the British Council.

== Critical reception ==
The work of Richard Caldicott has been extensively critically reviewed, most notably in The Village Voice, The Guardian weekend edition, Architectural Digest, The New York Times, The New Yorker, which stated about Caldicott's work, "Although the work is light and unpretentious, echoes of Kasimir Malevich, Ellsworth Kelly, and Robert Mangold give it some weight," and Wallpaper (magazine), which stated, "His work is photographic, yet it is not figurative. By using the camera to record collages and constructions, Caldicott has carved himself a unique aesthetic niche that manages to reference iconic modernism without reverting to familiar forms."

== Collections ==
Work by Richard Caldicott is included in the permanent collections of multiple museums, including that of the Museo of Electrographie in Cuenca, Spain, the Davis Museum of Contemporary Art in Barcelona, Spain, the Kunstmuseum Bonn in Bonn, Germany, and the Museum im Kulturspeicher Würzburg in Würzburg, Northern Bavaria, Germany. His work is also included in multiple global institutional collections, including that of BP, Goldman Sachs, and Merrill Lynch. Works by Caldicott are also included in multiple high-profile private collections, including that of Sir Elton John, David Kronn and Simon Le Bon.
