= Michael Dempsey =

British bassist

- Born: Michael Stephen Dempsey; 29 November 1958 (age 67); Salisbury, Southern Rhodesia (Now Harare, Zimbabwe)
- Origin: Crawley, England
- Genres: Punk rock; post-punk; new wave; gothic rock; alternative rock
- Occupations: Musician; composer
- Instruments: Bass guitar; guitar; keyboards; vocals
- Years active: 1972–present
- Member of: Levinhurst
- Formerly of: The Cure; the Associates; the Lotus Eaters; Presence; Malice; Easy Cure; Maxus

Michael Stephen Dempsey (born 29 November 1958) is an English musician, best known as the bassist for the Cure and the Associates.

== Biography ==
Dempsey was born on 29 November 1958 in Salisbury, Southern Rhodesia (now known as Harare, Zimbabwe). His family later settled in Crawley, West Sussex, where he was a school friend of future bandmates Robert Smith and Lol Tolhurst. Along with various classmates, the three first formed a band called the Obelisk in 1972, which eventually evolved into the Easy Cure and finally the Cure, the original lineup of which consisted of Dempsey on bass guitar, alongside Smith and Tolhurst.

Upon the official formation of the Cure in 1978, Dempsey was the band's bassist starting with their first single "Killing an Arab" and then their debut album Three Imaginary Boys in 1979. Dempsey has the distinction of being the only member of the Cure other than Smith to perform lead vocals on a released track, doing so for their cover of the Jimi Hendrix song "Foxy Lady" on the 1979 album. During this period he contributed to the brief Cure side project Cult Hero.

During sessions for the band's second album Seventeen Seconds, Dempsey criticized the shift in Smith's songwriting toward gloomy gothic rock. He left the Cure in November 1979 and was replaced by Simon Gallup. He returned to the band briefly in 1986 to appear in a new video for the re-released 1979 song "Boys Don't Cry".

During his later days with the Cure, Dempsey had been filling in for the Associates on bass, and officially joined that band soon after leaving the Cure. He was a member of the Associates until 1983, appearing on the albums Fourth Drawer Down and Sulk. During this period he also served briefly as a session and touring bassist for Roxy Music. Following the death of Associates frontman Billy Mackenzie in 1997, Dempsey now serves as the band's archivist.

Dempsey next joined the new wave band the Lotus Eaters and was a member from 1983 to 1985. In the early 1990s, Dempsey made several guest appearances with band Presence, which featured his former Cure bandmate Lol Tolhurst. He later composed music for the animated TV series PB Bear and Friends and scored the short animated film Swan Song. In 2008 he toured with an orchestral group assembled by Ron Geesin to perform the Pink Floyd album Atom Heart Mother. During this period he was also briefly a member of Levinhurst, another project headed by Tolhurst. Dempsey now works in audio production and restoration for various companies, and founded his own firm MDM Media. In 2019, he was inducted into the Rock and Roll Hall of Fame as a member of the Cure.

== Discography ==
The Cure

- Three Imaginary Boys (1979)
- Boys Don't Cry (1980)
- Standing on a Beach (1986)
- Greatest Hits (2001)

The Associates

- Fourth Drawer Down (1981)
- Sulk (1982)

The Lotus Eaters

- No Sense of Sin (1984)

Levinhurst

- Blue Star (2009)
