= Carole Morin =

British writer

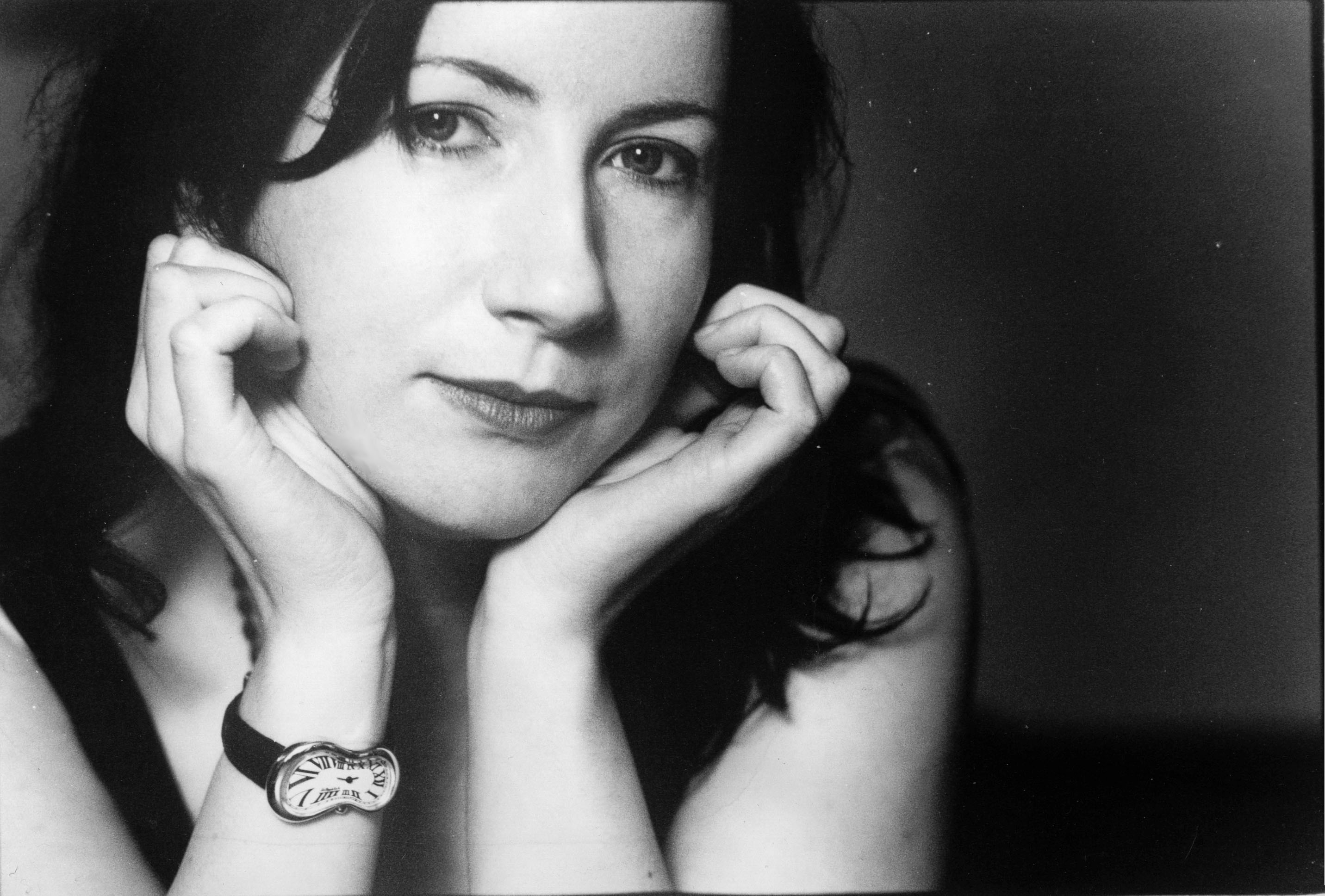
- Born: Glasgow, Scotland
- Occupation: Novelist
- Years active: 1983–present

Carole Morin is a Glasgow-born novelist who lives in Soho, London. She has had five novels published: Lampshades, Penniless in Park Lane, Dead Glamorous, Spying on Strange Men and Fleshworld.

Morin's fiction is critically acclaimed and has been described as 'Sylvia Plath with a sense of humour' and 'A Scottish nihilistic Catcher in the Rye'.

Paul Golding in The Sunday Times compared her favourably to Françoise Sagan, writing 'Morin exploits the same obsessively introspective, whimsically punctuated stream-of-consciousness technique, but she is a much finer plotter and a hell of a better swearer'.

Jackie McGlone of The Scotsman describes her 'wickedly entertaining pitch black novels' as being 'an ingenious blend of fact and fiction (full of epigrams and authorial apercus).’ She writes the 'Shallow Not Stupid' column in New York Arts and Fashion magazine Hint as Vivien Lash, the name of the main character in her fourth novel Spying on Strange Men.

== Biography ==
Carole Morin was born in Glasgow. At 16 she became a 'Junior Diplomat' to the United States on an AFS Scholarship. She was Literary Fellow at the University of East Anglia. She was Associate Editor of Granta magazine and writer-in-residence at Wormwood Scrubs prison. She has had weekly columns in both the right of centre The Spectator and left of centre New Statesman; according to The Scotsman she is the only novelist to achieve this. She has contributed to the Financial Times, The Telegraph, The Scotsman and The Herald. She has lived in Kampala and Beijing and now lives in London.

== Latest novel: Fleshworld ==
Carole Morin's latest novel Fleshworld was described by The Times as 'science fiction as Frenzy-era Alfred Hitchcock might have conceived it... a funfair slide through Clockwork Orange's purgatorial milk bar into the seminal ... experimentations of Michael Moorcock and George Zebrowski'. The reviewer, Simon Ings goes on to conclude that 'Carole Morin understands what the young-uns have forgot: that politeness has no place in science fiction'.

Alistair Mabbot, writing in The Herald, was equally enthusiastic. 'From its very first page, Carole Morin's darkly disorientating dystopia puts its readers on edge, plunging them into a strange and seemingly unknowable future that only gets more discomforting the more she reveals of it.'.

Describing it as 'dark and transgressive' and 'shot through with disturbing sexual imagery', Mabbot goes on to say 'this provocative, skilfully-written novel is a compelling take on guilt, self-loathing, the acceptance of penance and the longing for redemption'.

The Scotsman, calling it 'a compelling and elegantly crafted novel' describes the world it is set in as 'a dystopian future London which has been split into two halves, one puritanical, the other hedonistic. The first of Morin's novel to have a male protagonist it is largely narrated by Rich Powers, a wealthy immunologist. When Power's perfect wife Ice goes missing, the ghosts of his troubled past become more intrusive and he develops an ambiguous relationship with Trash White, who The Times describes as 'an innocent(ish) schoolgirl'.

Although Powers is the main narrator, the triangle which emerges between him, Ice and Trash is given an extra dimension by sections narrated first by Ice and then by Trash. The apocalyptic climax of the novel unfolds in the shadow of the figure The Times calls 'the mysterious, shape-shifting Chairman Luck'.

A short film based on the book was produced by filmmaker and photographer Andrew Catlin.

== Early career ==
Morin's first impact as a writer was as a prize winner of the Bridport short story competition in 1984. John Fowles described her entry Thin White Girls as 'an intriguing blend of sophistication and innocence'. She followed this by winning the Stand short story competition, judged by Angela Carter, in 1987. Thin White Girls was subsequently published by Faber & Faber in their First Fictions collection along with her Stand-prize-winning short story "Hotel Summer" later republished in The Herald newspaper.

Thin White Girls, like much of Morin's subsequent fiction, is narrated by a young female with a ruthless and unusual sense of humour. 'I think about toilets a lot,' she tells us, 'and how awful it must be to be a toilet.' This leads to the narrator writing a story at school from the point of view of a toilet. 'It was one of those stories where it's about the person telling it, so everything's "I", except the "I" hasn't to be yourself, if you see what I mean.' Her teacher is angry, 'But really I know my idea was much better' she continues, 'and when I'm out of her school I'll write about toilets as much as I like.' Patrick Gale called it a "witty recreation of the fierce ambitions and divided loyalties of childhood".

== First novel: Lampshades ==
Carole Morin's first novel Lampshades was published by Secker and Warburg in 1991. Largely set in a London and Glasgow that is almost, but not quite, recognisable as the landscape of the late Eighties, it tells the tale of a brave, verbally venomous but ultimately vulnerable sociopath called Sophira Van Ness. Sophira was described by Alexander Linklater "psychologically unhinged and fixated on Hitler". Linklater also called the novel 'strange to the point of uniqueness' with a 'powerful and at times compulsive appeal'. Sebastian Beaumont writing in the Gay Times (Feb 1992) says 'the invective is so rich and relentless that it is not offensive, but amusing instead. Morin has, by describing completely over-the-top prejudice, shown how absurd prejudice really is. ' He continues, 'This is a fascinating and macabrely funny book about misguided obsessions, and misplaced, erroneous concepts of purity. It is also extremely readable.' Grace Ingoldby, writing in The Independent, said, 'It is hard to resist quoting Lampshades at length, for Morin's first novel is so salty, has such stinging style. The worse she makes her Hitler-loving heroine..the more we like her.' Michael Porter reviewing the American edition in The New York Times, however, found the novel disquieting. '[Morin] seems intent on subverting any expectation that Sophira will abandon her ways or be punished for them'.

== Second novel: Dead Glamorous ==
Carole Morin's second book, Dead Glamorous was published in 1996. Opinion differs as to whether this book is an autobiography, a novel or somewhere in between. Maureen Cleave writing in the Daily Telegraph implies that it inclines more towards fiction, 'She quotes Rudolph Valentino.' writes Cleave, '"There's no substitute for what you really want." Except he never said that – she made it up.'

'Carole Morin has enough autobiography to last her a lifetime,' wrote Allan Brown in the Sunday Times, '90 per cent of it comprises Dead Glamorous – or at least the 90 per cent she claims to be true. The rest is obfuscation and exaggeration, designed to give her already improbable tale the sheen of some glorious myth.' Morin, in the same interview claims that critics' attempts to identify which part was invention were usually wayward. 'The clues are definitely in the book,' she said, 'but none of the reviewers got it right. They say, how can she expect us to believe this bit is true, when I know that it is.'

Dead Glamorous tells the story of Maria Money and her relationship with her acquisitive mother and suicidal brother and with the alternative reality of the cinematic imagination. As Maureen Cleave puts it John's suicide 'haunts the book' as it builds towards a life-affirming conclusion.

Alex Clark, writing in the TLS, said 'Her narrative voice is flippant, wise-cracking, streetsmart and hard as nails. Its brittleness sometimes stretches the reader to an almost unbearable degree before a compensatory piece of warmth, in the form of an abrupt confession, a piece of apparently unmediated emotion, is forthcoming.'

== Third novel: Penniless in Park Lane ==
Carole Morin's third book Penniless in Park Lane was published by John Calder in 2001. In a satirical depiction of London as the love affair with New Labour starts to cool, it tells the story of Astrid Ash.

'Astrid Ash is a bitch of the highest order,' says Paul Dale, writing in The List. 'Part-time model, full-time swinging micro celeb, she lives with her millionaire boyfriend and corrupt New Labour MP Ginger. When he dumps her, she returns to her native Glasgow with her moaning mum and mealy-mouthed friend. Going stir crazy..she works out a ruse to smooth a return to Ginger's penthouse and wreak horrid revenge.'

Mark Stanton, writing in the Glasgow Herald describes Ash as 'a vulnerable yet tough woman who rails against the mediocrity and hypocrisy which surround her.'

Stanton quotes Ash, in a scene in which she visits an orphanage, as striving for a 'reason to organise a happy ending', going on to say 'It is well worth hanging on to find out if Astrid's own ending is to be a happy one.'

'What a talented, funny and downright addictive writer Carole Morin is, says Paul Dale, describing Penniless in Park Lane as 'perfectly structured' and seeing in it 'shades of Wilde and Plath'. Friend and editor of Sylvia Plath, Al Alvarez described the book as 'funny, troublesome, rude, vindictive, sharp as a knife and elegantly written'.

Amanda Blinkhorn, writing in the Hampstead and Highgate Express described Penniless in Park Lane as a 'sharply observed modern satire on New Labour.'

'Carole Morin gave up guilt for Lent,' Blinkhorn continues, 'and has no intention of succumbing to the temptation of wallowing in it again. In a world where women particularly are almost required to be overworked, overtired and overwrought, she is a refreshing, not to say alarming, beacon of decadence...with a teenager's bafflement about the modern obsession with trying and failing to have it all....'

Kim Millar, writing in the Evening Times described Penniless in Park Lane as 'Hard, cynical and so funny it actually made me cry,' going on to describe it as, 'a brilliant but strangely bleak book'.

== Fourth novel: Spying on Strange Men ==
Carole Morin's fourth novel, Spying on Strange Men, was published by Dragon Ink in 2013. It tells the story of Vivien Lash, a glamorous artist with a mysterious diplomat husband who adores her. She spends her time gleefully tracking her 'installation', which is what she calls her 'creepy neighbour'.

Jackie McGlone in the Scotsman describes it as "Double Indemnity without the insurance policy, a love story gone very, very wrong".

'It's a twisted love triangle about a woman who loves her husband but wants to kill him,' Morin expands 'She's insuring her heart against him. And her boyfriend is really rich so they don't need the money to escape.'

Richard Godwin describes the book as 'a compelling, unsettling Noir novel written in sharp, elegant prose with scenes that move between surreal humour and a sudden darkness.' He goes on to praise 'Morin's ability to write characters whose identities are partly self-fiction or who are on the verge of psychosis'.

== Performances ==
Morin made her performance debut at the South Bank Centre and has appeared there several times. Performances of Spying on Strange Men, the first of which was at the Beijing Bookworm in June 2012, were always marked by an announcement that she would be reading in character as her "evil twin Vivien Lash".

Other performance venues include the Society Club Soho and the Glasgow University Literary Society, Resonance FM and on the Soho Radio programme hosted by Jim Sclavunos of Nick Cave & the Bad Seeds.
