= Alan Rankine =

Scottish musician (1958–2023)

- Born: 17 May 1958; Bridge of Allan, Stirlingshire, Scotland
- Died: 2 January 2023 (aged 64)
- Genres: Post-punk; synth-pop; experimental pop; new wave
- Occupations: Musician; composer; record producer
- Instruments: Keyboards; guitar
- Years active: 1970s–2023
- Labels: Les Disques du Crépuscule; Virgin
- Formerly of: The Associates

Alan Rankine (17 May 1958 – 2 January 2023) was a Scottish musician and record producer best known as keyboardist and guitarist for rock band the Associates, which he co-founded with lead vocalist Billy MacKenzie in the late 1970s.

== Early life ==
Alan Rankine was born on 17 May 1958 in Bridge of Allan, Stirlingshire. He lived in "the posh part of Dundee" until around the age of 11, followed by Glasgow and then Linlithgow. His father, Jim Rankine, was a school inspector and his mother was a secretary. As a youth, he was a national-level tennis player, but as racket technology developed, he knew that he was too short (5 ft 8 in; 1.73 m) to continue competing. After he heard the guitar sound on the 1969 song "Spirit in the Sky" by Norman Greenbaum, he said, "I want that". Once Rankine stopped playing tennis, he practised the guitar up to five or six hours a day.

== Career ==
Rankine began his career with the cabaret band Caspian, which became the Associates. Together they recorded three albums: The Affectionate Punch (1980), the singles compilation Fourth Drawer Down (1981) and Sulk (1982). Rankine left the band in 1982 on the eve of what would have been the Sulk tour, due to Billy MacKenzie's reluctance to travel.

While MacKenzie continued with other associates, Rankine established himself as a producer, working with artists such as Paul Haig, Cocteau Twins, and the Pale Fountains. He signed a recording contract with Belgian label Les Disques du Crépuscule in 1986 and embarked on a solo career. He recorded three solo studio albums: The World Begins to Look Her Age (1986), She Loves Me Not (1987), and the fully instrumental The Big Picture Sucks (1989).

Rankine later worked as a lecturer in Stow College in Glasgow until 2010, when he left to return to music production. While working as a lecturer he helped students to set up their own inhouse record label Electric Honey, which went on to launch the careers of bands such as Belle and Sebastian, Snow Patrol and Biffy Clyro.

== Death ==
Rankine died on 2 January 2023, at the age of 64. He died peacefully in his home after spending Christmas with his family. The cause of death was later confirmed to be heart disease.

== Solo discography ==
=== Albums ===
- The World Begins to Look Her Age (1986), Les Disques du Crépuscule
- She Loves Me Not (1987), Virgin/Les Disques du Crépuscule
- The Big Picture Sucks (1989), Les Disques du Crépuscule

=== Compilation album ===
- The Big Picture Sucks/The World Begins to Look Her Age (1989), Crépuscule au Japon/JVC Victor

=== Singles ===
- "The Sandman" (1986), Les Disques du Crépuscule
- "Last Bullet" (1986), Les Disques du Crépuscule
- "Days and Days" (1987), Les Disques du Crépuscule
- "The World Begins to Look Her Age" (1987), Virgin/Les Disques du Crépuscule
- "The Sandman" (1987), Virgin/Les Disques du Crépuscule
