= Billy MacKenzie =

Scottish singer (1957–1997)

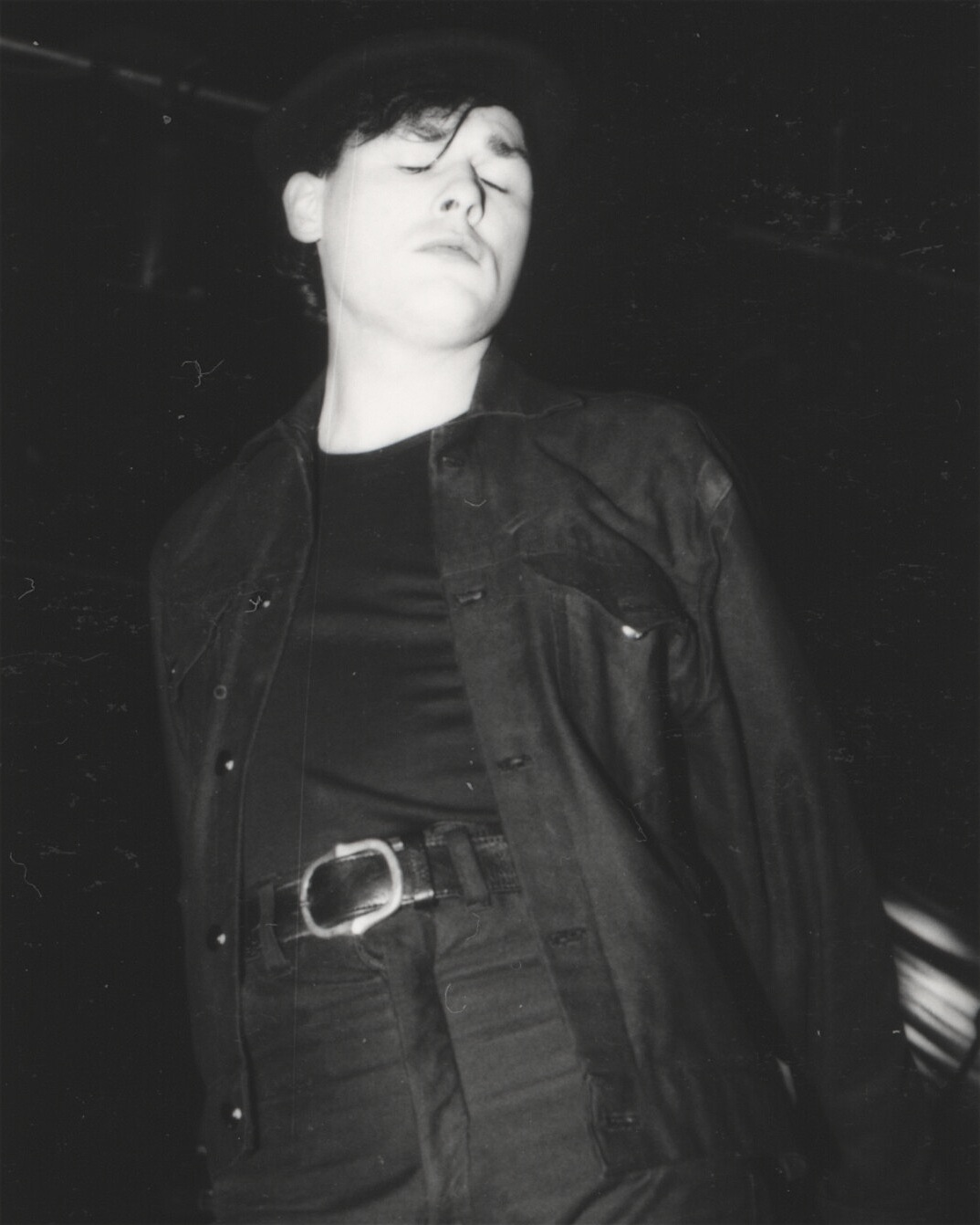
- MacKenzie performing at the University of Dundee in 1985

Background information
- Born: William MacArthur MacKenzie; 27 March 1957; Dundee, Scotland
- Died: 22 January 1997 (aged 39) Auchterhouse, Angus, Scotland
- Genres: Post-punk; synth-pop; experimental pop; new wave
- Occupations: Singer; songwriter
- Instrument: Vocals
- Years active: 1976–1997
- Labels: MCA; Fiction; Situation Two; WEA; Circa; Virgin; Nude; One Little Indian
- Formerly of: The Associates

William MacArthur MacKenzie (27 March 1957 – 22 January 1997) was a Scottish singer and songwriter, known for his distinctive high tenor voice. He was the co-founder and lead vocalist of the post-punk and pop band the Associates. He also had a brief solo career releasing his debut studio album, Outernational, in 1992, his only solo album released during his lifetime.

== Early life ==
William MacArthur MacKenzie was born on 27 March 1957 in Dundee, Scotland. As a child, he lived on Park Avenue in the Stobswell area of the city. He attended St Mary's Forebank Primary School and St Michael's Secondary School. He led a peripatetic lifestyle, decamping to New Zealand at the age of 16, and travelling across America aged 17. Here he married Chloe Dummar, the sister-in-law of his Aunt Veronica. While MacKenzie was quoted as saying the marriage was made to stave off deportation so that he could sing with the New Orleans Gospel Choir – calling his wife a 'Dolly Parton type' – Dummar still believes the pair were in love. He left her after three months of marriage and returned to Dundee, and the two never had contact again. Chloe Dummar filed for divorce in 1980, and MacKenzie did not contest the filing. Chloe was the sister of Melvin Dummar, who claimed to be a beneficiary of Howard Hughes' will and was the subject of the movie Melvin and Howard.

== Career ==
=== The Associates ===
MacKenzie returned to Scotland where he met guitarist Alan Rankine and in 1976 formed the Ascorbic Ones. They changed the name to Mental Torture and finally the Associates in 1979. Rankine left the Associates in 1982, but MacKenzie continued to work under the name for several years until he began releasing material under his own name in the 1990s.

=== Collaborations ===
MacKenzie collaborated with many other artists during his career. He had a fruitful partnership with the Scottish indie musician Paul Haig of the post-punk band Josef K, the result being low key dates in Glasgow and Edinburgh during the mid-1980s, which mixed their own best known songs with covers of songs such as Sly and the Family Stone's 1971 song "Running Away" and Yoko Ono's 1981 song "Walking on Thin Ice". Later the pair united to perform "Amazing Grace" on a Scots Hogmanay television programme, and each donated a song to the other's forthcoming studio album. "Chained" proved a highlight on the next Haig album, although MacKenzie's version of "Reach the Top" remained unreleased after the Associates' The Glamour Chase project was shelved by WEA. Following MacKenzie's untimely death in 1997 an entire album of Haig and MacKenzie material, Memory Palace, appeared on Haig's own label Rhythm of Life.

In 1987, he wrote lyrics for two tracks on Yello's fifth studio album One Second: "Moon on Ice", which he sang himself, and "The Rhythm Divine", which was sung by the Welsh singer Shirley Bassey and was released as a single. A version sung by MacKenzie was released on the cassette and CD versions of Associates' compilation album Popera. MacKenzie also collaborated with B.E.F. (British Electric Foundation), a band and production company that span-off Heaven 17, for their two studio albums Music of Quality and Distinction Volume One (1982), and Volume Two (1991). In 1991, he returned as a guest singer for the track Capri Calling on Yello's new album Baby. His final recording was the song "Pain in Any Language", with the English electronic music group Apollo 440. The band made a dedication to MacKenzie in the album notes to their second studio album Electro Glide in Blue (1997).

== Personal life ==
=== Sexuality and gender ===
During a 1996 interview with Gary Mulholland in Time Out magazine, when presumed by Mulholland to be gay and asked about the ongoing speculation regarding his sexual orientation, MacKenzie clarified, saying: "Well, it's something that... how would you say? My background is that I'm more interested in individuals and if I've got an affection towards them, then I don't really see hang-ups or boundaries coming into things. So if you're honest and you like either sex, if you're comfortable with that, that's OK." Later in the same interview, he added, "It's what's behind somebody's gender that appeals to me and what they are in essence." This would be the first time MacKenzie spoke candidly about his bisexuality to the press.

Rankine noted in a 2016 interview with the online talk show Dangerous Minds, "A lot of his songs are about his struggling with his gender and his sexuality." In his lifetime, MacKenzie did not publicly label his gender identity, but in the aforementioned Time Out interview, he stated: "I'm just waiting for the day when we're all what we were intended to be... hermaphrodites." MacKenzie made allusions to androgyny and cross-dressing in his solo songs "Falling Out with the Future" and "Velvet", as well as an unreleased demo with Steve Aungle, "Gender Illusionist". In a 1982 interview with Smash Hits, he mused about getting a sex change to avoid having to go to war. Music journalist Ned Raggett presented A Matter of Gender: The Fluid Life of Billy Mackenzie, an analysis of MacKenzie's quotes on gender and the personal observations of others in his life.

== Death and legacy ==
On 22 January 1997, MacKenzie died by suicide, overdosing on a combination of paracetamol and prescription medication in a shed in his father's garden at Auchterhouse, Angus. He was 39 years old. Clinical depression and the death of his mother are believed to have contributed to his suicide.

He was the subject of a biography by Tom Doyle, The Glamour Chase, in 1998.

Siouxsie Sioux, a friend of MacKenzie, wrote the song "Say", revealing in the lyrics that they were going to meet just before his death. The song was released as a single by Siouxsie's second band the Creatures in 1999. The Cure song "Cut Here" in 2001, written by Robert Smith, a friend of MacKenzie, is about the regret Smith felt about seeing MacKenzie a few weeks before his death backstage at a Cure concert, and not giving him any of his "precious time" and fobbing him off. For her fifth studio album Medúlla (2004), the Icelandic singer Björk considered singing a beyond the grave duet with MacKenzie using recordings given to her by his father, but eventually decided against it. In 2006, the Norwegian singer Jenny Hval, under the name Rockettothesky, released her debut single "Barrie for Billy MacKenzie" as a tribute. In the immediate aftermath of his death, his bandmate Alan Rankine and the label briefly considered resurrecting the band under the name the Associate.

Between 9 and 27 June 2009, a play entitled Balgay Hill about the story of MacKenzie's life was showing at Dundee Repertory Theatre, in MacKenzie's home town. It tells the story of his life through the eyes of four fictional characters, and the title of the play derives from the name of the Dundee cemetery where MacKenzie was buried.

The novel Spying on Strange Men (2012) by Carole Morin, contains the following section:

"I checked my face in the mirror, opened the book about Billy Mackenzie.
One day at Billy's house his dad brought in a cake and Billy said, 'That cake is like your aunty's hat.'
'That image kept replaying in my mind, another memory of something I didn't witness, as James came out of the bathroom.
'What are you reading?' he asked.
'A book,' I said, flicking to the end where Billy kills himself and goes to sleep for ever in the dog basket."

Morin said in an interview:

I was devastated by his death which is odd because I didn't know him. My husband did. Mackenzie's death affected me in a way that Ian Curtis's didn't. Curtis seemed born to die. Mackenzie should have outgrown his gloom and become an eccentric old man. I think our work is similar. It's the duality of glamour and spirituality in his voice that attracts me. His toughness and fragility; darkness and laughter. He could be a character from one of my books. I always meant to send him a copy of Dead Glamorous.

== Discography ==
=== With the Associates ===
- The Affectionate Punch (1980)
- Fourth Drawer Down (1981)
- Sulk (1982)
- Perhaps (1985)
- Wild and Lonely (1990)
- The Glamour Chase (2002)

=== Solo ===
==== Albums ====
- Outernational (1992), Circa
- Beyond the Sun (1997), Nude – UK No. 64
- Memory Palace (credited with Paul Haig) (1999), Rhythm of Life
- Eurocentric (credited with Steve Aungle) (2001), Rhythm of Life
- Auchtermatic (2005), One Little Indian
- Transmission Impossible (2005), One Little Indian

==== Singles ====
- "Baby" (1992), Circa – UK No. 88
- "Colours Will Come" (1992), Circa – UK No. 95
- "Pastime Paradise" (1992), Circa – promotional release only

=== Guest vocals ===
==== Lead vocals ====
- B.E.F.'s Music of Quality and Distinction Volume One album: "Secret Life of Arabia" and "It's Over" (1982)
- Stephen Emmer's Vogue Estate album: duet with Martha Ladly on "Wish On" (1982)
- Sweden Through the Ages EP: It Helps to Cry (1986)
- Yello's Snowball and the Sound of Yello: "Life Is a Snowball" (1987); unreleased promo CD
- Yello's One Second album: "Moon on Ice" (1987) †
- Yello "The Rhythm Divine" (version 2): special limited edition 12" single (MERXR253) featuring MacKenzie's lead vocals in place of Shirley Bassey's (1987); the same recording later appeared on the Popera album (1990). "Norma Jean", a variation of "The Rhythm Divine" song with different lyrics originally recorded for an unfinished project by Yello's Dieter Meier about Marilyn Monroe, was released as track 9 from his Auchtermatic CD compilation (One Little Indian – TPLP442CD, 2004)
- Uno's self-titled album: Cinemas of the World (1987), as well as the single of the same name
- Holger Hiller's album Oben Im Eck (1986): title track and version, "We Don't Write Anything on Paper or So", and "Whippets" single (1987)
- Yello's Baby album: "Capri Calling" (1991)
- B.E.F.'s Music of Quality and Distinction Volume Two album: "Free". (1991) "Free" also appears on the 1998 B.E.F. 'Best Of' album, later reissued by Disky in 2001
- Loom's "Anacostia Bay" single (1996) † ‡
- Barry Adamson's Oedipus Schmoedipus album: "Achieved in the Valley of the Dolls" (1996) ‡
- Apollo 440's Electro Glide in Blue album: "Pain in Any Language" (1997) † ‡
- "Put This Right" – Co-written by Laurence Jay Cedar and Billy MacKenzie. (1996)
- "Deamanda" – Co-written by Laurence Jay Cedar and Billy MacKenzie. (1996)

† lyrics by MacKenzie ‡ also appear on Auchtermatic

- Unreleased tracks "Sinking Deeper" and "The Hungry Look" recorded 1980 under the name Strange News. Billy, Steve Reid and rhythm section Andy and Gavin. Only copies of tracks exist.

==== Backing vocals ====
- The track "Fields" on the Joy album by the fellow Scottish band Skids: "Fields" single (7" and 12" mixes) (Virgin, 1981) also released on Skids' Dunfermline CD (1987)
- Yello's One Second album: the singles "Call It Love", "The Rhythm Divine", and 'Goldrush' (1987)
- Yello's Flag album:, the single "Of Course I'm Lying", and "Otto Di Catania" (1988)
- Jih's Take Me to the Girl single >, title track plus "Come Summer Come Winter" and "Wake Up" (1988)
- Boris Grebenshchikov's Radio Silence album/single: "That Voice Again" (1989)
- Yello's Baby album: "Drive/Driven" and the single "Rubberbandman" (1991)

(Six of MacKenzie's Yello tracks later released on the Essential Yello album) (1992)

- Siobhan Fahey: "Do I Scare You" (1996) unreleased until 2004 when it first appeared on Shakespears Sister's 'Best Of' double CD, and then on the "3" album in 2005
- Peach – Audiopeach album: "Deep Down Together" and "Give Me Tomorrow" credited as the MacArthurettes with Caragh McKay (1998)
- Paul Haig – "Listen to Me" single (1997)> = lyrics by MacKenzie

=== Other credits ===
- Orbidöig's "Nocturnal Operations" single: MacKenzie played tubular bells (1981) – this single was reissued in 1984, credited as the Sensational Creed
- Sweden Thru the Ages – "It Helps to Cry" single, produced by MacKenzie (1986)
- Paul Haig Chain album: "Chained", lyrics by MacKenzie, performed by Haig (1989)
