= Fourth Drawer Down =

Compilation album by the Associates
- Released: October 1981
- Genres: Post-punk; new wave; experimental
- Length: 1:04:26 (reissue)
- Label: Situation Two
- Producers: Mike Hedges; Flood

The Associates chronology
The Affectionate Punch (1980)	Fourth Drawer Down (1981)	Sulk (1982)

Singles from Fourth Drawer Down
- 1. "Tell Me Easter's on Friday" Released: 1981; 2. "Q Quarters" Released: 1981; 3. "Kitchen Person" Released: 1981; 4. "Message Oblique Speech" Released: 1981; 5. "White Car in Germany" Released: 1981

Fourth Drawer Down is a compilation album by the Scottish post-punk and new wave band the Associates, released in October 1981 by independent record label Situation Two. It compiles the A- and B-sides from the five singles the band released that year on the label. The album was re-issued in 2000 by V2 Records, containing five bonus tracks.

== Recording ==
In July 1981 the Associates appeared in Smash Hits magazine with lead vocalist Billy Mackenzie announcing his plan to release ten singles over the remainder of the year. His ambition was founded on a plan to use competing label money to record new material then release previously recorded material. Many of the songs that appeared on Fourth Drawer Down had a notably darker and more experimental edge than their debut studio album The Affectionate Punch (1980), although MacKenzie's lyrics often defied literal interpretation. An early single "Tell Me Easter's on Friday" is propelled by a somber pulsing beat with a cycling mournful guitar line. The song "Q Quarters" — called "desolately beautiful" by Smash Hits — ends with the striking lines: "Washing down bodies / Seems to me a dead-end chore / Floors me completely / Beauty drips from every pore". Washing down bodies was a job that Billy MacKenzie said his grandmother did during World War II. The song "Kitchen Person" features a rhythm taken from an electric typewriter and MacKenzie singing down the tube of a vacuum cleaner (an effort that earned them Single of the Week in Melody Maker).

The album title had a literal origin: the fourth drawer down in a chest in the band's flat at the time contained their supply of "over the counter herbal relaxant tablets that when taken by the handful... would acts as a sleeping aid as well as producing a pleasant bedtime buzz." The cover photograph was taken in the swimming pool of the recording studio they used in Oxfordshire.

== Critical reception ==
Professional ratings
Review scores
Source	Rating
AllMusic	4.5/5 stars
Mojo	4/5 stars
Q	3/5 stars
Record Collector	3/5 stars
Smash Hits	7/10
Uncut	8/10

Fourth Drawer Down has been well received by music critics, with reviewers commenting on the band's increased experimentalism. NME journalist Richard Cook wrote that the Associates "brutalise form with a purpose," continuing: "In trying to dismantle the accepted notions of organised playing and reconstructing with uncaring regard for accessibility – all these tracks are cluttered, confused and strewn with near-random noise – The Associates reassert their humanity in electric music."

Andy Kellman of AllMusic observed "Those who are familiar with Associates know this because of Mackenzie's operatically soulful voice, [Alan] Rankine's wildly experimental production, and, when used, his atonal utilitarian guitar playing that seems like it's playing the multi-instrumentalist more than he's playing it. Just as there are Smiths fans who listen intently to Johnny Marr's guitar playing and attempt to block out Morrissey's flamboyance, there surely are numerous beings who tune out Mackenzie's crooning to hone[sic] in on Rankine's actions. Those who can appreciate both are in for a real feast, and those who prefer one over the other still have much to sink their teeth into."

In a 2016 review, Alastair McKay of Uncut called Fourth Drawer Down "an extraordinary document on which the sense of mystery deepens, and the commitment to sonic experiment becomes more pronounced." Trouser Press noted an overall sense of "determined experimentation" on the album, despite finding it "lessened by the exclusion of certain B-sides in favor of later tracks which reveal Mackenzie's growing preference for pose over accomplishment."

== Track listing ==
All tracks are written by Billy Mackenzie and Alan Rankine, except where noted.

Side one
No.	Title	Length
1.	"White Car in Germany"	5:28
2.	"A Girl Named Property"	4:56
3.	"Kitchen Person"	4:53
4.	"Q Quarters"	4:55

Side two
No.	Title	Writer(s)	Length
5.	"Tell Me Easter's on Friday"		4:29
6.	"The Associate"	Billy Mackenzie; Alan Rankine; Michael Dempsey	5:00
7.	"Message Oblique Speech"		5:35
8.	"An Even Whiter Car"		4:45

2000 CD reissue bonus tracks
No.	Title	Length
9.	"Fearless (It Takes a Full Moon)"	3:37
10.	"Point Si"	5:15
11.	"Straw Towels"	5:16
12.	"Kissed"	6:11
13.	"Blue Soap"	3:52

== Personnel ==
Credits are adapted from the Fourth Drawer Down liner notes.

The Associates

- Billy Mackenzie – vocals; one-string guitar
- Alan Rankine – guitars; keyboards; other instruments
- Michael Dempsey – bass guitar; keyboards
- John Murphy – drums; marimba

Production and artwork

- Mike Hedges – production; engineering
- Flood – production
- Antoine Giacomoni – sleeve photography
