= The Associates (band) =

Scottish post-punk band

- Billy Mackenzie (left) and Alan Rankine in a Sire promotional image, c. 1981

Background information
- Origin: Dundee, Scotland
- Genres: Post-punk; synth-pop; experimental pop; new wave
- Years active: 1979–1990; 1993 (reunion)
- Labels: MCA (1979); Fiction (1980–1981); Situation Two (1981); WEA (1982–1988); Circa (1989–1990); Virgin (reissues)
- Past members: Billy Mackenzie; Alan Rankine; John Sweeney; Ty Jeffries; John Murphy; Michael Dempsey; Steve Goulding; Martha Ladly; Martin Lowe; Ian McIntosh; Steve Reid; Roberto Soave; Jim Russell; Stephen Knight; L. Howard Hughes; Moritz von Oswald

The Associates (or simply Associates) were a Scottish post-punk band, formed in Dundee in 1979 by lead vocalist Billy MacKenzie and guitarist Alan Rankine. The band released an unauthorized cover version of David Bowie's "Boys Keep Swinging" as their debut single in 1979, which landed them a recording contract with Fiction Records. They followed with their debut studio album The Affectionate Punch in 1980 and the compilation album Fourth Drawer Down in 1981, both to critical praise.

They achieved commercial success in 1982 with their UK Top 10 studio album Sulk and UK Top 20 singles "Party Fears Two" and "Club Country", during which time they were associated with the new pop movement. Rankine left the group that year, leaving MacKenzie to record under the Associates name until 1990. They briefly reunited in 1993. MacKenzie's suicide in 1997 was the band's end; Rankine died twenty-six years later in 2023.

== History ==
=== 1976–1982: Formation and independent success ===
Billy MacKenzie and guitarist Alan Rankine met in Edinburgh, Scotland in 1976. Rankine was in a prog rock band called Caspian and recruited MacKenzie to become the band's new singer after seeing him performing at a nightclub in Edinburgh. Unhappy with the band's approach, MacKenzie and Rankine soon opted to continue as a duo. They were said to have formed the cabaret duo the Ascorbic Ones, although Rankine claimed that this was "a fantasy band that Bill and I dreamt up to give ourselves a past".

Disappointed that their early recordings were not getting picked up, MacKenzie concocted the stunt of doing a cover version of David Bowie's "Boys Keep Swinging", without copyright permission, just six weeks after Bowie's version hit the UK Top 10. Released in June 1979, this debut Associates single reached No. 15 in Record Mirror's Scottish chart and gained them airplay on John Peel's Radio One show. MacKenzie later said that the band recorded the Bowie song "to prove the point. It was a strange way of proving it, but it worked. People said, 'That is awful. How dare they!'" The ensuing attention earned them a recording contract with Fiction Records, and their debut studio album, The Affectionate Punch, followed on 1 August 1980. By this time the duo of MacKenzie and Rankine had been joined by bassist Michael Dempsey and drummer John Murphy, though in most promotional material the group were still marketed as a duo.

A string of 1981 non-album singles on the label Situation Two were compiled as Fourth Drawer Down, released that October. These releases saw the band develop an interest in experimenting with unorthodox instrumentation and recording techniques, including sounds being amplified through the tube of a vacuum cleaner on the track "Kitchen Person". Also in 1981, Rankine and MacKenzie released a version of "Kites" under the name 39 Lyon Street, with Christine Beveridge on lead vocals. The B-side, "A Girl Named Property" (a remake of "Mona Property Girl" from the "Boys Keep Swinging" single), was credited to the Associates.

=== 1982–1988: WEA/Warner years ===
As Situation Two's parent label Beggars Banquet had a labels deal with WEA International at the time (primarily for Gary Numan), the Associates found themselves signed to Warner with their releases now going out on their own Associates record label. The band's breakthrough came in 1982 with the release of the single "Party Fears Two". Buoyed along by the popularity of synth-pop at the time, the song reached No. 9 on the UK singles chart with the band becoming one of the leading acts of the new pop movement. Two other hits followed, "Club Country" and "18 Carat Love Affair", a vocal version of the instrumental track "Nothinginsomethingparticular". On 14 May 1982, the band released their most commercially successful studio album, Sulk. Martha Ladly, of the Canadian rock band Martha and the Muffins, contributed backing vocals and keyboards to this album.

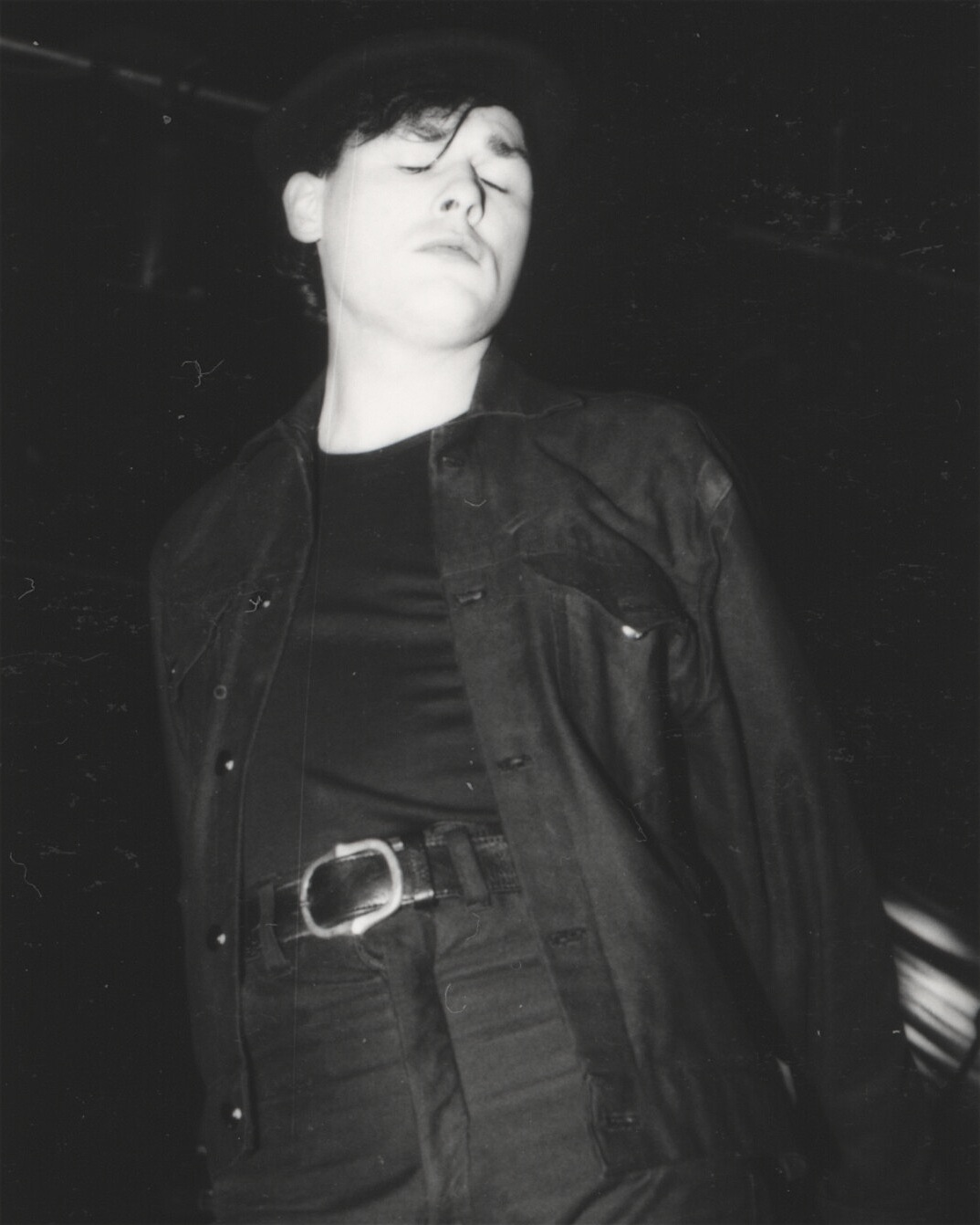
MacKenzie performing at the University of Dundee in 1985

At the last minute, MacKenzie refused to proceed with the extensive tour that had been planned to promote the release of Sulk. This proved disastrous for the band's career; the band was being courted by Seymour Stein of Sire Records, but without MacKenzie's willingness to tour, Stein lost interest. In the aftermath of MacKenzie's refusal, Rankine left the band. MacKenzie continued to write and record music under the name Associates until 1990.

Their third studio album Perhaps was released on 9 February 1985. It was a commercial failure in comparison to their previous releases, peaking at No. 23 on the UK Albums Chart but only selling around 40,000 copies, putting Billy MacKenzie in significant debt to Warner Music Group. However, it was their only album to chart in the Netherlands, peaking at No. 29 on the Dutch Albums Chart. The first single taken from the album was "Those First Impressions" which reached No. 43 on the UK singles chart, "Waiting for the Loveboat" peaked at No. 53, and "Breakfast" turned out to be their last Top 50 hit, peaking at No. 49. "Breakfast" was also their sole showing on the Dutch Single Top 100 chart, peaking at 36.

The non-album single "Take Me to the Girl" was also released around this time, but only made No. 95 on the UK singles chart.

In 1988, WEA/Warner rejected the band's fourth studio album The Glamour Chase, considering it not commercially viable (it was later released on a two-disc set with Perhaps). However, they decided to release MacKenzie's synth-pop cover version of Blondie's 1979 single "Heart of Glass" as a single and also put the track on the record label's compilation album Vaultage from the Electric Lighting Station. This track was to be MacKenzie's last release whilst under contract to WEA in the United Kingdom, as he signed to AVL/Virgin subsidiary Circa Records (still under the Associates name at this point). "Heart of Glass" was released in September 1988 on a number of formats including a twelve-inch single with an anaglyphic 3D cover (which came with 3D glasses) and a CD single. It reached number 56 on the UK singles chart.

The track was included on Popera: The Singles Collection by WEA in 1990, alongside withdrawn follow-up single "Country Boy", and a version of the MacKenzie and Boris Blank song, "The Rhythm Divine".

Between 1987 and 1992, MacKenzie worked with Blank and musical partner Dieter Meier of the Swiss electronic music band Yello. MacKenzie wrote the lyrics of the song "The Rhythm Divine", which can also be found on Yello's fifth studio album, One Second, with lead vocals by the Welsh singer Shirley Bassey and MacKenzie singing backing vocals. During these years MacKenzie contributed to three Yello studio albums: One Second (1987), Flag (1988) and Baby (1991), whilst tracks for The Glamour Chase and Outernational (1992) were recorded with Blank at Yello's recording studio.

=== 1989–1997: Circa and solo years ===
After his fourth studio album was rejected and "Country Boy" single scrapped, MacKenzie signed to AVL/Virgin subsidiary Circa Records, to release the fifth Associates album Wild and Lonely (the fourth studio album to be released during Billy MacKenzie's lifetime). The album was released on 24 March 1990 and was produced by the Australian record producer Julian Mendelsohn. It peaked at No. 71 on the UK Albums Chart and had three singles charting in the lower parts of the UK singles chart with "Fever", "Fire to Ice" and "Just Can't Say Goodbye", peaking at numbers 81, 92 and 79 respectively. Wild and Lonely was the last album that MacKenzie recorded under the name the Associates, as from this point his releases would go out under his own name. However, recordings were sporadic and subsequent records failed to reach the UK chart and sold far fewer than their/his early albums. In 1992, MacKenzie released an electronica-influenced solo studio album, Outernational, for Circa Records with limited success.

In 1993, MacKenzie and Alan Rankine began working on new material together. News of an Associates revival generated hype and speculation of a tour, and the demos recorded by the two were promising. However, MacKenzie was not fully committed to the reunion and especially touring with it, so the Associates broke up for a final time. MacKenzie went back to his solo work, signing a recording contract with Nude Records and finding a new collaborative partner in Steve Aungle.

Rankine later became a lecturer in music at Stow College in Glasgow, and worked with the Scottish indie pop band Belle and Sebastian on their debut studio album, Tigermilk (1996).

=== 1997–present: Legacy releases ===
MacKenzie committed suicide in 1997 at age 39, shortly after the death of his mother. He had been suffering from clinical depression. He was contemplating a comeback at the time with material co-written with Aungle. The studio albums Beyond the Sun (1997) and Eurocentric (2000) were released posthumously and, in 2005, reconstructed and expanded with new unreleased songs into the two studio albums Auchtermatic and Transmission Impossible.

Before MacKenzie's death, almost all Associates records had been deleted. Former band member Michael Dempsey and the MacKenzie estate began a reissue programme to make sure the band's legacy continued, reissuing almost every Associates album, including a 25th anniversary edition of The Affectionate Punch in 2005. In addition to the original albums, two compilation albums were released: Double Hipness (2000), a collection of early tracks with the 1993 reunion demos; and Singles (2004), an extended version of Popera – The Singles Collection which caught up with post-1990 material and included the cover version of Bowie's "Boys Keep Swinging". In 2002, The Glamour Chase (recorded in the years 1985–87) was finally released as a set titled The Glamour Chase & Perhaps. Finally, Wild and Lonely and MacKenzie's solo studio album Outernational were repackaged with bonus tracks in 2006.

The Tom Doyle book The Glamour Chase: The Maverick Life of Billy MacKenzie, first published in 1998 and reissued in 2011, documented the band's career and MacKenzie's subsequent life.

Rankine died on 3 January 2023 at the age of 64.

== Legacy and influence ==
The Associates drew stylistically on a variety of genres, including art rock, disco, glam, minimalism, balladry and cabaret. Their music has been described as post-punk, synth-pop, new wave and experimental pop. They have been described as part of the new pop movement. The group was hailed by the likes of Björk and U2's lead vocalist Bono. Björk stated that her "love affair with the Associates started when I was fifteen [...], it was Sulk I really got into". "I really admired the way Billy used and manipulated his voice on that record". Bono said about the Associates: "We ripped them off. Billy was a great singer: I couldn't rip him off". Artists who have covered "Party Fears Two", include the Divine Comedy, Dan Bryk, King Creosote and Heaven 17. Journalist Simon Reynolds called the group "great should-have-beens of British pop". Chris Tighe wrote that the band have "been belated acknowledged as one of the '80s' most inspired pop groups".

The Scottish crime writer and philanthropist Ian Rankin took the title of his twentieth instalment of the Inspector Rebus series for his novel, Even Dogs in the Wild (2015), from a track on The Affectionate Punch, and the song itself has a role in the story.

Upon news of Rankine's passing, the English electronic band Ladytron wrote on social media, "No Associates = No Ladytron" while saying that he was the "creator of amongst the most joyous magnificent pop music of all time."

== Band members ==
- Billy MacKenzie – lead vocals (1979–1990, 1993) (died 1997)
- Alan Rankine – guitars, keyboards (1979–1982, 1993) (died 2023)
- John Sweeney – drums (1979–1980)
- John Murphy – drums (1980–1981) (died 2015)
- Michael Dempsey – bass guitar (1980–1982)
- Steve Goulding – drums (1982–1983)
- Martha Ladly – keyboards, backing vocals (1982–1986)
- Miffy Smith – keyboards, saxophone (1983–1984)
- Martin Lowe – live guitar (1982)
- Ian McIntosh – live and radio session guitar (1982–1985)
- Steve Reid – guitar (1982–1984)
- Roberto Soave – bass guitar (1983–1985)
- Jim Russell – drums (1984)
- L. Howard Hughes – keyboards (1982–1990)
- Moritz von Oswald – drums, percussion (1985–1990)

== Discography ==
Studio albums

- The Affectionate Punch (1980)
- Sulk (1982)
- Perhaps (1985)
- Wild and Lonely (1990)
