= Sulk =

- Cover photography by Peter Ashworth

Studio album by the Associates
- Released: 14 May 1982
- Recorded: 1982
- Studio: Playground (Camden Town)
- Genre: Synth-pop; post-punk; art rock
- Length: 41:11
- Label: Associates/Beggars Banquet; WEA (Europe); Sire (US)
- Producer: The Associates; Mike Hedges

The Associates chronology
Fourth Drawer Down (1981)	Sulk (1982)	Perhaps (1985)

Singles from Sulk
- 1. "Party Fears Two" Released: 29 January 1982; 2. "Club Country" Released: 30 April 1982

Sulk is the second studio album by the Scottish post-punk and pop band the Associates. It was released on 14 May 1982 on their own Associates imprint of Beggars Banquet Records for the UK and throughout the rest of Europe on WEA Records and in the US on 4 October by Sire Records.

It stayed in the UK Albums Chart for 20 weeks, peaking at No. 10, and it was crowned the album of the year by the British weekly music magazine Melody Maker. Although it was the group's breakthrough record both critically and commercially, it was to be the last studio album recorded by the original pairing of Alan Rankine and Billy Mackenzie, as Rankine departed four months after its release.

== Recording ==
Signing a distribution deal with WEA Records at the end of 1981 on the strength of the demos for "Party Fears Two" and "Club Country", Associates were given a £60,000 advance by the record label. Having spent half of the advance immediately on block-booking a studio for an indefinite period of time, the band moved into individual rooms at the Swiss Cottage Holiday Inn in London, including an extra room for MacKenzie's pet whippets, which he fed on smoked salmon ordered from the hotel's room service. The band also spent large amounts of money on other items such as clothing and drugs. In a 2007 interview bassist Michael Dempsey recalled that "we were all ridiculously profligate. But it wasn't entirely ridiculous to be doing things that way because Bill would coax money out of record companies in a kind of mesmeric way. He thought that the more money we owed them, the more obligation on their part to make this work to get their investment back." Rankine said that the excessive spending influenced the sound of the album: "If we hadn't spent the money, the album wouldn't have got made in the way it did. It was mental, but there was also a self-assured cockiness, because we knew we had these songs."

Sulk was recorded at record producer Mike Hedges' self-built Playground studio, in a former warehouse in nearby Camden Town, and cost £33,000 to make. The stories regarding the recording sessions for this album have been well documented over the years. Rankine said that "I don't think there's been any exaggeration about what went on. If anything, I think people have been holding back a bit in their recollections. It was madness." He confirmed that the sessions included stunts such as urinating in a guitar and filling drums with water to see how it affected their sound, but that the story that the band had filled the studio with helium balloons was an exaggeration, stating that they had fooled around with a helium balloon that had been brought in one day, but no more than that. However, both Rankine and Dempsey said that despite the heavy spending and antics in the studio, the band worked long hours and were completely focused on the record they were making. Drummer John Murphy left the band shortly after completing the recording of the album, unable to cope with MacKenzie and Rankine's behaviour.

== Writing and composition ==
The bulk of Sulk was written and recorded in the same sessions as for the compilation album Fourth Drawer Down (1981), and the bizarre antics in the studio were a result of the band experimenting with ways of creating new sounds. Rankine said, "We were constantly thinking of what we could do to make this sound different, what can we do with the tools that we've got—which was the musicians. We were the tools. It wasn't just for the sake of being different. But we'd look up lists of instruments and go, 'What the hell is a jangle piano?' The next day this piano would suddenly arrive with all these little metal bits. And that's what we used on 'Party Fears Two', for the intro." He also described their restructuring of the traditional drum kit to create an attention-grabbing sound: "What we did on ["Bap de la Bap"] and quite a lot of the songs on Sulk was take away all the tom-toms and make the whole drum kit out of snare drums. So there'd be a seven-inch metal snare drum as the snare and a five-inch copper snare as one of the toms, and then maybe a real deep nine-inch black beauty made out of ebony as another tom-tom. So it made the whole thing really explosive."

Mackenzie's lyrics on Sulk are often cryptic and ambiguous. Speaking to NME at the time of the album's release about the band's biggest hit single, Mackenzie said, "'Party Fears' could be about a whole lot of things. It could be about a husband and wife arguing with each other. It could be about communism and conservatism, political party extremes. It could be about schizophrenics. The lyrics of a song like that go deliberately to the extremes to get something across, like an actor using a heavy hand gesture when he speaks a line."

According to Rankine, "'Nude Spoons' was about an acid trip Bill had had when he was fifteen or sixteen. Apparently, the spoons were copulating and there was a war going on between the spoons and the plastic flowers in the pot next to them." Rankine believed that "Club Country" was Mackenzie's response to attending the New Romantic clubs at the time and finding the scene to be very superficial.

== Cover ==
The stylised cover of the album was designed and shot by the English music photographer Peter Ashworth in an out-of-season summer house in South London, with Mackenzie and Rankine sitting on park benches covered by dust sheets. Regarding the shoot, Alan Rankine was quoted in an interview by The Guardian, 'Its cover featured Rankine pulling what he later described as a "mental" face, in an attempt to convey "the sort of sultry sumptuousness of the music".'

A digitised version of the image was chosen for inclusion in the National Portrait Gallery's permanent collection.

== Release and promotion ==
The first single released from the album was "Party Fears Two". It became the band's breakthrough single, reaching number 9 on the UK singles chart in March 1982. A second single, "Club Country", was almost as successful, reaching number 13 in May 1982. The singles' success owed greatly to Associates' memorable appearances on the UK's best known and most watched television music show of the time, Top of the Pops (TOTP). The group took the opportunity to subvert the family-friendly nature of the programme with absurdist practical jokes: on their second appearance performing "Party Fears Two", Rankine played the banjo while dressed in a fencing suit and wearing samurai make-up with chopsticks in his hair, while Mackenzie spent much of the song singing to the image of himself in the television monitors rather than face the audience or the cameras. For their final Top of the Pops appearance, Rankine had two chocolate guitars made by the London luxury department store Harrods which he played during their performance of "18 Carat Love Affair", one of which he broke up and gave to audience members halfway through the song. Rankine said that the reason for their stunts was that "partly it was just a response to the boredom of having to be there at the BBC studio from half eight in the morning and not getting out until ten at night".

Following the chart success of "Party Fears Two" and "Club Country", the band released the double A-sided single "18 Carat Love Affair"/"Love Hangover" in July 1982, which reached number 21 in the UK charts. "18 Carat Love Affair" was a version of Sulk's closing instrumental track "nothinginsomethingparticular" with added vocals, while "Love Hangover" was a cover of Diana Ross's 1976 hit single. Problems started to surface within the group the following month when they began rehearsals with a nine-piece band for an upcoming tour of the US and Canada to promote the forthcoming release of Sulk in North America. The demands placed on Mackenzie's voice caused him to develop pharyngitis, resulting in the cancellation of a string of August concert dates across the UK, including three planned headline shows at the Edinburgh Festival. In September Mackenzie pulled out of the tour the night before the band were due to travel, claiming that he did not feel the musicians were up to the standards required. This was the final straw for Rankine, who felt Mackenzie had thrown away the group's best chance to become famous in the US, and he quit the band.

The album was issued in the US by Sire Records on 4 October 1982 with a significantly different track listing. Along with an overall different track sequence, the UK LP tracks "Bap de la Bap", "Nude Spoons" and "nothinginsomethingparticular" were replaced with both sides of the "18 Carat Love Affair"/"Love Hangover" single and two tracks from the compilation album Fourth Drawer Down, "The Associate" and "White Car in Germany". "It's Better This Way" and "Party Fears Two" appeared as versions remixed by Mark Arthurworrey, and "Club Country" was replaced by the 7" edited single version.

The original UK and European CD release of Sulk, released in 1988, also followed the US track listing, but contained edited versions of "Club Country", "Love Hangover" and "The Associate".

The remastered version of Sulk, issued in June 2000, finally reverted to the versions and track listing on the original UK release, apart from replacing "Club Country" with a different version from those on all previous releases. The remastered CD also included seven bonus tracks, including both "18 Carat Love Affair" and "Love Hangover".

== Critical reception ==
Professional ratings
Review scores
Source	Rating
AllMusic	4.5/5 stars
Mojo	4/5 stars
Q	4/5 stars
Record Collector	5/5 stars
Smash Hits	8/10
Sounds	5/5 stars
Uncut	9/10

Ian Pye of Melody Maker stated that the group's "melodramatic aspirations" needed a voice like Mackenzie's to be able to carry them out successfully, and said, "In parts, Sulk is really over-produced, the stamp of perfectionists, and while there's nothing to match the commercial appeal of their two [singles], this record has an almost timeless majesty that can only make Billy Mackenzie's rapturous grin grow wider still". Paul Morley of NME wrote "Sulk deals with everything, in its hectic, drifting way ... There is an uninterruptible mix-up of cheap mystery, vague menace, solemn farce, serious struggle, arrogant ingenuity, deep anxiety, brash irregularity, smooth endeavour ... Sometimes Sulk is simply enormous: and then again it is fantastically unlikely."

Reviewing the 2000 reissue David Peschek of Mojo called Sulk "their florid, hysterical masterpiece" and observed, "This remains extraordinarily potent music, a repository of the otherness contemporary pop so lacks". Simon Reynolds stated in Uncut that "Sulk is so lovely it's harrowing... Associates crammed all the derangement and texture-saturated voluptuousness of psychedelia into pop". David Quantick's review of the deluxe edition in 2016 observed that "Sulk appears at first to be a pop album—and there are few greater pop singles than 'Party Fears Two'—but its glossy sound and high budget disguise the fact that it's actually very odd".

Ned Raggett of AllMusic said that Sulk was "very much the Associates at probably the best period of their career. Mackenzie's impossibly piercing cabaret falsetto rivals that of obvious role model Russell Mael from Sparks, while Rankine's ear for unexpected hooks and sweeping arrangements turns the stereotypes of early-'80s synth music on their heads. The bass work from ex-Cure member Michael Dempsey isn't chopped liver either, and the result is a messy but wonderful triumph no matter what version is found."

=== Accolades ===
Sulk was named album of the year for 1982 in Melody Maker and was placed at number 18 in the NME critics' list of albums of the year. The album was also included in the book 1001 Albums You Must Hear Before You Die (2006).

== Track listing ==
All songs written and composed by Alan Rankine and Billy Mackenzie, except where indicated.

=== Original UK and Canada release ===
Side one

1. "Arrogance Gave Him Up" – 2:57
2. "No" – 5:41
3. "Bap de la Bap" – 4:13
4. "Gloomy Sunday" (Rezső Seress, Sam M. Lewis) – 4:09
5. "Nude Spoons" – 4:15

Side two

1. "Skipping" (Rankine, Mackenzie, Michael Dempsey) – 3:57
2. "It's Better This Way" – 3:22
3. "Party Fears Two" – 5:45
4. "Club Country" – 5:29
5. "nothinginsomethingparticular" – 2:16

=== Original US and Europe release ===
Side one

1. "It's Better This Way" (remix) – 3:30
2. "Party Fears Two" (remix) – 5:08
3. "Club Country" – 5:33
4. "Love Hangover" (Marilyn McLeod, Pam Sawyer) – 6:09
5. "18 Carat Love Affair" – 3:47

Side two

1. "Arrogance Gave Him Up" – 3:00
2. "No" – 5:45
3. "Skipping" (Rankine, Mackenzie, Dempsey) – 4:00
4. "White Car in Germany" – 4:50
5. "Gloomy Sunday" (Seress, Lewis) – 4:08
6. "The Associate" – 5:00

=== 2000 remastered CD ===
Tracks 1 to 10 as original UK and Canada version, except that the edits of "Party Fears Two" and "Club Country" are 5:11 and 4:48 long, respectively.

11. "Love Hangover" (McLeod, Sawyer) (12" version of double A-sided single, released July 1982) – 6:15
12. "18 Carat Love Affair" (double A-sided single, released July 1982) – 3:42
13. "Ulcragyceptimol" (B-side of 12" of "Club Country") – 4:32
14. "And Then I Read a Book" (previously unreleased) – 4:28
15. "Australia" ^{1} – 3:20
16. "Grecian 2000" (previously unreleased) – 3:29
17. "The Room We Sat in Before" ^{2} – 3:31

=== 2016 2-CD Deluxe Edition ===
CD1 The same as the original UK and Canada version, except that the edit of "Party Fears Two" is 5:35 long.

CD2

1. "18 Carat Love Affair" – 3:42
2. "Love Hangover" (McLeod, Sawyer) – 6:11
3. "Club Country" (12" Version) – 6:58
4. "Party Fears Two" (Instrumental) (previously unreleased) – 4:41
5. "It's Better This Way" (Alt Version) – 3:41
6. "And Then I Read a Book" (previously unreleased) – 3:48
7. "Ulcragyceptimol" – 4:33
8. "Skipping" (Alt Version) (Rankine, Mackenzie, Dempsey) (previously unreleased) – 3:49
9. "Australia" ^{1} (previously unreleased) – 3:31
10. "Me, Myself and the Tragic Story" ^{3} (previously unreleased) – 3:17
11. "I Never Will" ^{4} (Demo) – 3:51
12. "Club Country" (Demo) – 4:05
13. "Grecian 2000" – 3:28
- ^{1} "Australia" is a version of the instrumental track "Voluntary Wishes", which appeared on the 12" single of "18 Carat Love Affair"/"Love Hangover", with a different arrangement and with vocals.
- ^{2} "The Room We Sat in Before" is a demo version of "It's Better This Way" featuring just electric guitars and vocals, and was produced by Chris Parry, owner of the Associates' previous record label Fiction Records.
- ^{3} "Me, Myself and the Tragic Story" is an alternative version of "Arrogance Gave Him Up".
- ^{4} "I Never Will" is an early version of "Party Fears Two", with different lyrics.

Note: the versions of "And Then I Read a Book" and "Australia" are different on the 2000 and 2016 releases.

== Personnel ==
The Associates

- Billy Mackenzie – vocals
- Alan Rankine – guitar, keyboards, other instruments
- Michael Dempsey – bass guitar
- John Murphy – drums

Additional personnel

- Martha Ladly – backing vocals, keyboards on "Club Country", "Love Hangover" and "18 Carat Love Affair"
- Steve Goulding – drums on "Love Hangover" (uncredited)

Technical

- Mike Hedges – production
- John Leckie – production on "Australia" and "Me, Myself and the Tragic Story" on 2016 deluxe edition
- Peter Ashworth – sleeve photography

== Release history ==
Region	Date	Label	Format	Catalog
United Kingdom	14 May 1982	Associates/ Beggars Banquet	LP	ASCL1
United Kingdom	14 May 1982	Associates/ Beggars Banquet	Cassette	ASCC1
Europe	14 May 1982	WEA	LP	240 005-1
United States	4 October 1982	Sire	LP	1-23727
Canada	4 October 1982	Beggars Banquet	LP	XBEG 54861
Germany	4 October 1982	WEA	Long-play cassette (featuring both UK and US versions of the album)	240 005-4
United Kingdom	4 October 1982	WEA	Long-play cassette (featuring both UK and US versions of the album)	WX 24 C
United Kingdom and Europe	July 1988	WEA	CD	240 005-2
United Kingdom and Europe	19 June 2000	V2	Remastered CD with extra tracks	VVR1012012
United Kingdom	6 May 2016	BMG	2-CD deluxe edition	BMGCAT2CD53
United Kingdom	6 May 2016	BMG	Remastered LP	BMGCATLP53
