= Show (The Cure album) =

Live album by the Cure
- Released: 13 September 1993
- Recorded: 18–19 July 1992
- Venue: The Palace of Auburn Hills (Auburn Hills, Michigan)
- Length: 128:34
- Label: Fiction; Elektra
- Producer: Robert Smith

The Cure chronology
Wish (1992)	Show (1993)	Paris (1993)

Professional ratings
Review scores
Source	Rating
AllMusic	3/5 stars
Calgary Herald	C
NME	7/10
Rolling Stone	4/5 stars
Select	4/5 medals

Show is a live album released in 1993 by the English alternative rock band the Cure. It was recorded live over two nights at The Palace of Auburn Hills, Auburn Hills, Michigan (a suburb of Detroit) in 1992, during the successful Wish tour. Show was also released as a concert video.

This live album was released along with Paris, which was recorded in Paris. Show leaned somewhat more towards the band's poppier and more recent material such as "Just Like Heaven", "Pictures of You" and "Friday I'm in Love" while Paris skewed towards their older cult-classics.

The album was re-issued on vinyl as a double LP in the UK as part of Record Store Day on 22 April 2023. This release was remastered by Robert Smith and Miles Showell at Abbey Road Studios.

== Track listing ==
Show is a double-CD release in most cases. There are various versions with differing track listings. The US version is the only one-disc edition. The songs that did not fit onto the US disc ("Tape", "Fascination Street", "The Walk" and "Let's Go to Bed") were released as the EP Sideshow. The video version, released on VHS, CD-i and LaserDisc, contains extra tracks.

Disc one

1. "Tape" – 2:25
2. "Open" (Wish) – 7:18
3. "High" (Wish) – 3:31
4. "Pictures of You" (Disintegration) – 7:38
5. "Lullaby" (Disintegration) – 4:25
6. "Just Like Heaven" (Kiss Me, Kiss Me, Kiss Me) – 3:37
7. "Fascination Street" (Disintegration) – 5:00
8. "A Night Like This" (The Head on the Door) – 4:46
9. "Trust" (Wish) – 5:15

Disc two

1. "Doing the Unstuck" (Wish) – 4:20
2. "The Walk" (Japanese Whispers) – 3:32
3. "Let's Go to Bed" (Japanese Whispers) – 3:41
4. "Friday I'm in Love" (Wish) – 3:45
5. "In Between Days" (The Head on the Door) – 3:12
6. "From the Edge of the Deep Green Sea" (Wish) – 7:54
7. "Never Enough" (Mixed Up) – 4:52
8. "Cut" (Wish) – 5:25
9. "End" (Wish) – 7:58

Single-disc release:

1. "Open" (Wish) – 7:20
2. "High" (Wish) – 3:31
3. "Pictures of You" (Disintegration) – 7:38
4. "Lullaby" (Disintegration) – 4:15
5. "Just Like Heaven" (Kiss Me, Kiss Me, Kiss Me) – 3:34
6. "A Night Like This" (The Head on the Door) – 4:45
7. "Trust" (Wish) – 5:14
8. "Doing the Unstuck" (Wish) – 4:00
9. "Friday I'm in Love" (Wish) – 3:34
10. "In Between Days" (The Head on the Door) – 2:55
11. "From the Edge of the Deep Green Sea" (Wish) – 7:54
12. "Never Enough" (Mixed Up) – 4:45
13. "Cut" (Wish) – 5:32
14. "End" (Wish) – 8:04

Sideshow EP:

1. "Tape (intro) – 3:07
2. "Just Like Heaven" (Kiss Me, Kiss Me, Kiss Me) – 3:47
3. "Fascination Street" (Disintegration) – 5:01
4. "The Walk" (Japanese Whispers) – 3:32
5. "Let's Go to Bed" (Japanese Whispers) – 3:38

=== CD-i release (2-disc music video) ===
==== CD-i disc one ====
1. "Tape"
2. "Open" (Wish)
3. "High" (Wish)
4. "Pictures of You" (Disintegration)
5. "Lullaby" (Disintegration)
6. "Just Like Heaven" (Kiss Me, Kiss Me, Kiss Me)
7. "Fascination Street" (Disintegration)
8. "A Night Like This" (The Head on the Door)
9. "Trust" (Wish)
10. "Doing the Unstuck" (Wish)
11. "The Walk" (Japanese Whispers)
12. "Let's Go to Bed" (Japanese Whispers)
13. "Friday I'm in Love" (Wish)

==== CD-i disc two ====
1. "In Between Days" (The Head on the Door)
2. "From the Edge of the Deep Green Sea" (Wish)
3. "Never Enough" (Mixed Up)
4. "Cut" (Wish)
5. "End" (Wish)
6. "To Wish Impossible Things" (Wish)
7. "Primary" (Faith)
8. "Boys Don't Cry" (Boys Don't Cry)
9. "Why Can't I Be You?" (Kiss Me, Kiss Me, Kiss Me)
10. "A Forest" (Seventeen Seconds)

== Personnel ==
- Robert Smith – vocals, guitar, 6-string bass
- Simon Gallup – bass guitar
- Porl Thompson – guitar, keyboards
- Boris Williams – drums, percussion
- Perry Bamonte – keyboards, guitar, 6-string bass

== Charts ==
Chart performance for Show
Chart (1993)	Peak position
Australian Albums (ARIA)	16
Austrian Albums (Ö3 Austria)	16
Dutch Albums (Album Top 100)	71
European Albums (Music & Media)	63
German Albums (Offizielle Top 100)	37
New Zealand Albums (RMNZ)	36
Swedish Albums (Sverigetopplistan)	34
Swiss Albums (Schweizer Hitparade)	37
UK Albums (OCC)	29
US Billboard 200	42

Chart performance for Show (30th anniversary edition)
Chart (2023)	Peak position
Belgian Albums (Ultratop Wallonia)	30
German Albums (Offizielle Top 100)	17
Scottish Albums (OCC)	35
UK Albums Sales (OCC)	21
UK Physical Albums (OCC)	21
UK Vinyl Albums (OCC)	12
US Billboard 200	77
US Top Alternative Albums (Billboard)	11
US Top Catalog Albums (Billboard)	26
US Top Rock Albums (Billboard)	12
US Indie Store Album Sales (Billboard)	4

== Certifications ==
Certifications for Show
Region	Certification	Certified units/sales
United Kingdom (BPI)	Silver	60,000^{‡}
^{‡} Sales+streaming figures based on certification alone.
