= Paris (The Cure album) =

Live album by the Cure
- Released: 25 October 1993
- Recorded: 19–21 October 1992
- Venue: Le Zénith de Paris, France
- Length: 57:37
- Label: Fiction; Elektra

The Cure chronology
Show (1993)	Paris (1993)	Wild Mood Swings (1996)

Professional ratings
Review scores
Source	Rating
AllMusic	3.5/5 stars
Calgary Herald	B+
Hot Press	(favourable)
Rolling Stone	(favourable)
The Rolling Stone Album Guide	2/5 stars
Vox	8/10

Paris is a live album recorded by the British band the Cure at Zénith de Paris in October 1992 during the band's Wish tour. The band announced the album in July 1993 and released it that October.

Paris was released at the same time as Show, which was recorded in the United States.

In mid-1996, Billboard reported that Paris had sold 95,000 copies in the United States by that point, much less than the 213,000 copies of Show sold there by the same point. The magazine described the release of the album "within a few weeks" of Show as exemplifying the "unorthodox career path" that the band had taken.

== Reception ==
Stephen Thomas Erlewine of AllMusic praised the album, observing "Show featured mostly hit singles; Paris features the songs that built their cult, including "Close to Me" and "Letter to Elise." Consequently, most fans will find this the more interesting of the two live albums, and, out of the two records, it is the more consistent and satisfying."

Patrick Brennan of Hot Press was also positive on the song choices and felt it was "for die-hard Cure fans it's a gorgeous treat and for other acolytes of the lukewarm or lapsed variety it might well re-recruit them back into Bob Smith's sometimes wacky, ofttimes gloomy and always idiosyncratic world."

Michele Kirsch of Vox praised the album's "top shelf sound engineers" and "good editing". Rating the album eight out of ten, he noted "there's nothing here that doesn't work."

== Track listing ==
Paris - 1992 Original Release

1. "The Figurehead" (Pornography) – 7:26
2. "One Hundred Years" (Pornography) – 7:15
3. "At Night" (Seventeen Seconds) – 6:39
4. "Play for Today" (Seventeen Seconds) – 3:50
5. "Apart" (Wish) – 6:37
6. "In Your House" (Seventeen Seconds) – 3:59
7. "Lovesong" (Disintegration) – 3:31
8. "Catch" (Kiss Me, Kiss Me, Kiss Me) – 2:41
9. "A Letter to Elise" (Wish) – 4:50
10. "Dressing Up" (The Top) – 2:49
11. "Charlotte Sometimes" (stand-alone single) – 3:58
12. "Close to Me" (The Head on the Door) – 3:57

Paris - 30th Anniversary Edition

LP 1

Side A

1. "Shake Dog Shake" (The Top) – 5:05
2. "The Figurehead" (Pornography) – 7:26
3. "Play for Today" (Seventeen Seconds) – 3:50

Side B

1. "At Night" (Seventeen Seconds) – 6:39
2. "In Your House" (Seventeen Seconds) – 3:59
3. "One Hundred Years" (Pornography) – 7:15

LP 2

Side A

1. "Apart" (Wish) – 6:37
2. "Lovesong" (Disintegration) – 3:31
3. "A Letter to Elise" (Wish) – 4:50

Side B

1. "Catch" (Kiss Me, Kiss Me, Kiss Me) – 2:41
2. "Charlotte Sometimes" (stand-alone single) – 3:58
3. "Dressing Up" (The Top) – 2:49
4. "Close to Me" (The Head on the Door) – 3:57
5. "Hot Hot Hot!!!" (Kiss Me, Kiss Me, Kiss Me) – 3:53

== Personnel ==
- Robert Smith – vocals, guitar
- Simon Gallup – bass guitar
- Porl Thompson – guitar
- Boris Williams – drums
- Perry Bamonte – keyboard, guitar

=== Production ===
- Robbie Williams – production manager
- Howard Hopkins – stage manager
- Tom Wilson – keyboard tech and backstage coordinator

== Charts ==
1993 chart performance for Paris
Chart (1993)	Peak position
Australian Albums (ARIA)	72
UK Albums (OCC)	56
US Billboard 200	118

2024 chart performance for Paris
Chart (2024)	Peak position
Austrian Albums (Ö3 Austria)	42
Belgian Albums (Ultratop Flanders)	34
Belgian Albums (Ultratop Wallonia)	12
Croatian International Albums (HDU)	14
German Albums (Offizielle Top 100)	11
Hungarian Physical Albums (MAHASZ)	20
Polish Albums (ZPAV)	97
Swiss Albums (Schweizer Hitparade)	20
