= Concert: The Cure Live =

Live album by The Cure
- Released: 26 October 1984
- Recorded: 5 May 1984, 8–10 May 1984
- Venue: in Oxford and at the Hammersmith Odeon (London)
- Studio: The Manor Mobile
- Genre: Gothic rock
- Length: 42:27
- Label: Fiction (UK); Elektra (Canada)
- Producer: Dave Allen, The Cure

The Cure chronology
The Top (1984)	Concert: The Cure Live (1984)	The Head on the Door (1985)

Professional ratings
Review scores
Source	Rating
AllMusic	3/5 stars
The Rolling Stone Album Guide	2/5 stars

Concert: The Cure Live is the first live album by English rock band the Cure. It was recorded in 1984 at the Hammersmith Odeon in London and in Oxford during The Top tour. The cassette tape edition featured, on the B-side, a twin album of anomalies, titled Curiosity (Killing the Cat): Cure Anomalies 1977–1984.

== Track listing ==
Tracks written by Robert Smith, Simon Gallup and Lol Tolhurst, except as noted.

1. "Shake Dog Shake" (Smith) – 4:14
2. "Primary" – 3:29
3. "Charlotte Sometimes" – 4:06
4. "The Hanging Garden" – 4:05
5. "Give Me It" (Smith) – 2:49
6. "The Walk" (Smith, Tolhurst) – 3:31
7. "One Hundred Years" – 6:48
8. "A Forest" (Smith, Matthieu Hartley, Gallup, Tolhurst) – 6:46
9. "10:15 Saturday Night" (Smith, Michael Dempsey, Tolhurst) – 3:44
10. "Killing an Arab" (Smith, Dempsey, Tolhurst) – 2:51

== Cassette tape edition ==
The B-side of the cassette tape edition of Concert contained a twin album titled Curiosity (Killing the Cat): Cure Anomalies 1977–1984, a set of Cure rarities recorded from 1977 to 1984:

1. "Heroin Face" (later included on Disc 2 of the remastered Three Imaginary Boys)
2. "Boys Don't Cry" (later included on Disc 2 of the remastered Three Imaginary Boys)
3. "Subway Song" (later included on Disc 2 of the remastered Three Imaginary Boys)
4. "At Night" (later included on Disc 2 of the remastered Seventeen Seconds)
5. "In Your House" (later included on Disc 2 of the remastered Seventeen Seconds)
6. "The Drowning Man" (later included on Disc 2 of the remastered Faith)
7. "Other Voices" (later included on Disc 2 of the remastered Faith)
8. "The Funeral Party" (later included on Disc 2 of the remastered Faith)
9. "All Mine" (later included on Disc 2 of the remastered Pornography)
10. "Forever (Version)" (later included on Disc 2 of the remastered The Top)

== Personnel ==
Personnel taken from Concert: The Cure Live liner notes.

- Robert Smith – vocals, guitar
- Porl Thompson – guitar, keyboards, saxophone
- Andy Anderson – drums
- Phil Thornalley – bass guitar
- Lol Tolhurst – keyboards
