= If Only Tonight We Could Sleep =

Song by the Cure

from the album Kiss Me Kiss Me Kiss Me
- Released: 26 May 1987
- Genre: Neo-psychedelia; raga rock
- Length: 4:50
- Label: Fiction
- Composers: Robert Smith; Simon Gallup; Porl Thompson; Boris Williams; Lol Tolhurst
- Lyricist: Robert Smith
- Producers: David M. Allen; Robert Smith

"If Only Tonight We Could Sleep" is a song by English rock band the Cure. It is fourth song on the band's seventh studio album Kiss Me, Kiss Me, Kiss Me (1987). Mike Turner of God Is in the TV found the song saw the band "returning to the Indian-inspired textures and tones" present on the band's fifth studio album The Top (1984) and disputed the perception that the song's lyrics address suicide finding this to be dismissed by the line which asks for a "deathless spell".

Frontman and singer Robert Smith listed the song in a list of songs he felt would be appropriate for Songs of a Lost World (2024), stating that he enjoys playing the song live and there's "lovely kind of moods to it when it’s played well."

== Composition and themes ==
Ned Raggett, reviewing for AllMusic, felt it was representative of the album's schizophrenic nature, describing it as an "extreme, narcotic track, a slow mood-out that brings the Cure's psychedelic tendencies to the fore" which is followed by the "ripping pop blast" of "Why Can't I Be You?". He described Boris Williams' drums as "trancy, slow semi-tribal drums", calling it "one of Williams' most creatively snaky drum performances". He noted the song "conjures up images of sleeping "on a bed made of flowers" and wanting to "slide into deep black water," the heavy echo and reverb on his vocals making everything sound even more like an opium den come to life."

Andrew Unterberger of Billboard noted the song "dips into Eastern instrumentation", with use of electronically emulated sitars which he felt "proved an invaluable texture in the song’s rich psychedelic stew". BBC described the song as "sheer elegance", while Jon Kean of God Is In The TV felt the song "breathes a sense of exoticism" and admired how the song "embrace[s] the notions of 'blissful' and 'tortured' simultaneously".

== Legacy ==
The song is featured on the band's double live video album Trilogy (2003) as an encore along with "The Kiss".

In 2004, American heavy metal band Deftones covered the song on the band's MTV Icon special.They also covered the song again in 2018 when they performed at Robert Smith's curated Meltdown Festival.

== Personnel ==
- Robert Smith – guitar, keyboards, vocals
- Simon Gallup – bass guitar
- Porl Thompson – guitar, keyboards
- Lol Tolhurst – keyboards
- Boris Williams – drums, percussion
