= Catch (The Cure song) =

Single by The Cure

from the album Kiss Me, Kiss Me, Kiss Me
- B-side: "Breathe"; "A Chain of Flowers"
- Released: 22 June 1987
- Genre: Pop; psychedelic folk
- Length: 2:43
- Label: Fiction Records
- Composers: Robert Smith, Simon Gallup, Porl Thompson, Boris Williams, Lol Tolhurst
- Lyricist: Robert Smith
- Producers: Robert Smith; Dave Allen

The Cure singles chronology
"Why Can't I Be You?" (1987)	"Catch" (1987)	"Just Like Heaven" (1987)

"Catch" is a song by English rock band The Cure released on 22 June 1987 as the second single from their album Kiss Me, Kiss Me, Kiss Me (1987). It was only released as a single in the UK, where it charted at No. 27, and Europe. Uproxx called it "a psych-folk gem that spotlights the band’s ’60s British pop side"

== Background ==
The music video was shot at the home of Gisèle Tissier in Villa Beau Site, France. Tim Pope, who directed the majority of the band's videos through the 80s and 90s, recalled, “The whole location in Nice, France, stank of dog shit,'... 'Tortoises were everywhere, cooking in the sun like boil-in-a-bag crustaceans, and we found another room that was just like something Miss Havisham would have lived in. It was filled with rotting ballerinas’ dresses and rag dolls with maggots in. The elderly lady who owned the joint came down the spiral staircase, like Gloria Swanson in Sunset Boulevard.”

Robert Smith, however, claimed that he only disliked one scene in the video claiming that former drummer and keyboardist Lol Tolhurst 'ruined it', saying, "We made this beautiful video and this old bastard in coal miner’s jeans wanders down the spiral staircase not even bothering to pretend he’s playing the violin.”

== Track listing ==
=== 7": Fiction / Fics 26 (UK) ===
1. "Catch" (2:43)
2. "Breathe" (4:47)

=== 12": Fiction / Ficsx 26 (UK) ===
1. "Catch" (2:43)
2. "Breathe" (4:47)
3. "A Chain of Flowers" (4:55)

=== 12": Polydor/ 888 728-1 (Germany) ===
1. "Catch" (2:43)
2. "Breathe" (4:47)
3. "Kyoto Song [Live in Orange]" (5:23)
4. "A Night Like This [Live in Orange]" (4:30)

=== CDV: Fiction / 080 186-2 (UK) ===
1. "Catch" (2:43)
2. "Breathe" (4:47)
3. "A Chain of Flowers" (4:55)
4. "Icing Sugar [New Mix]" (3:20)
5. "Catch" (2:43) [Video]

== Personnel ==
- Robert Smith - vocals, guitars
- Lol Tolhurst - keyboards
- Porl Thompson - guitars
- Simon Gallup - basses
- Boris Williams - drums, percussion

== Charts ==
=== Weekly charts ===
Chart (1987)	Peak position
Italy Airplay (Music & Media)	17
