= Presence (band) =

British rock band

- Gary Biddles, Rob Steen, Chris Youdell, Roberto Soave, Alan Burgess, Lol Tolhurst

Background information
- Origin: England
- Genres: Gothic rock; new wave
- Years active: 1990–1993
- Labels: Reality Records, Smash Records, Island Records
- Past members: Gary Biddles; Michael Dempsey; Lol Tolhurst; Chris Youdell; Alan Burgess; Roberto Soave; Rob Steen; Paul Redfern; Kevin Kipnis

Presence were a British rock band formed in 1990, best known for its associations with the Cure. They released the album Inside in 1992 and split the following year.

== History ==
Presence was formed by keyboardist Lol Tolhurst, a founding member of the Cure who had left that band in 1989; and singer Gary Biddles, a former member of Fools Dance who had also served as a member of the Cure's road crew in the early 1980s. Two other former members of the Cure, bassist Michael Dempsey and guitarist Porl Thompson, contributed to Presence's early demo recordings, with Dempsey receiving some songwriting credits.

The band's lineup was eventually completed with bassist Roberto Soave, guitarist Rob Steen, keyboardist Chris Youdell (formerly of Then Jericho), and drummer Alan Burgess. This lineup first released the single "In Wonder", followed by the album Inside in 1992, which despite some favorable reviews was not successful.

A second album titled Closer (produced by John Porter) was recorded during this period, but was not released because Tolhurst decided to end the band for personal reasons. Closer was finally released in 2014, shortly after the death of Gary Biddles.

Following the breakup of Presence, several members remained associated with the Cure. Roberto Soave occasionally filled in for Cure bassist Simon Gallup in the mid-1990s. Soave and Rob Steen were later members of the band Babacar with another former Cure member, Boris Williams. Tolhurst later formed the electronic band Levinhurst.

== Members ==
- Lol Tolhurst – keyboards
- Gary Biddles – vocals
- Chris Youdell – keyboards
- Alan Burgess – drums
- Roberto Soave – bass
- Rob Steen – guitar
- Michael Dempsey – bass (early recording sessions)
- Paul Redfern – bass (later recording sessions)
- Kevin Kipnis – bass (later recording sessions)

== Discography ==
- Inside (1992)
- Closer (2014)
