= Charlotte Sometimes (song) =

1981 single by The Cure

Single by The Cure
- B-side: "Splintered in Her Head"
- Released: 9 October 1981
- Recorded: 16–17 July 1981 at Playground Studio, England
- Genre: Gothic rock; post-punk
- Length: 4:13
- Label: Fiction, Polydor
- Songwriters: Robert Smith, Simon Gallup, Lol Tolhurst
- Producers: Mike Hedges, the Cure

The Cure singles chronology
"Primary" (1981)	"Charlotte Sometimes" (1981)	"The Hanging Garden" (1982)

Official video
- "Charlotte Sometimes" on YouTube

"Charlotte Sometimes" is a song by English rock band the Cure, recorded at producer Mike Hedges' Playground Studios and released as a non-album single on 9 October 1981 by Polydor Records, following the band's third studio album Faith. The titles and lyrics to both sides were based on the book Charlotte Sometimes by Penelope Farmer.

The single reached No. 44 on the UK Singles Chart.

== Content ==
The song "Charlotte Sometimes" was based on Charlotte Sometimes, a children's novel by English writer Penelope Farmer, published in 1969. According to Cure frontman Robert Smith: "There have been a lot of literary influences through the years; 'Charlotte Sometimes' was a very straight lift." Many lines in the song reflect lines directly from the book, such as "All the faces/All the voices blur/Change to one face/Change to one voice" from the song, compared to the first sentence of the book, "By bedtime all the faces, the voices, had blurred for Charlotte to one face, one voice". The song continues: "Prepare yourself for bed/The light seems bright/And glares on white walls", and the book continues, "She prepared herself for bed... The light seemed too bright for them, glaring on white walls". The title of the single's B-side, "Splintered in Her Head", was also taken from a line in the novel. The Cure later released another song based on the novel, "The Empty World", from their 1984 album The Top.

The mood of B-side "Splintered in Her Head" is overall more disquieting, with metallic, distorted vocals and heavy percussion, foreshadowing the sound and feel of the band's next studio album, Pornography. The 10-minute live version of "Faith" on the B-side of the 12" version of the single was recorded at the Sydney Capitol Theatre in August 1981 by the then-Australian Broadcasting Commission's youth radio station 2JJJ. This version was also included on the second disc of the deluxe reissue of the album Faith.

The cover of the single is a distorted picture of Mary Poole, Smith's then-girlfriend and later wife. The same picture was used again as the cover of the Cure's 1990 single "Pictures of You", but with the picture clear and undistorted.

== Recording ==
The single was recorded over 16 and 17 July 1981 at Mike Hedges' Playground Studio, named by Robert Smith, in between European festival dates and an upcoming North American tour. Production was overseen by Hedges and the band themselves.

== Music video ==
On advice by Fiction label owner Chris Parry, the music video for "Charlotte Sometimes" was filmed at Holloway Sanatorium. It features an actress portraying a schoolgirl and the character of Charlotte recreating scenes from the story in the presence of the band, while Smith mimes the words of the song.

== Release ==
The song reached No. 44 on the UK Singles Chart. It was later included on the bonus disc of the deluxe edition of Faith, released in 2005.

Live takes were included on the Concert and Paris albums.

== Reception ==
The book The Rough Guide to Cult Pop called the song "a goth masterpiece of doomed beauty and ruined elegance".

== Track listings ==
7" vinyl

All tracks are written by the Cure (Robert Smith, Simon Gallup and Lol Tolhurst).

Side A
No.	Title	Length
1.	"Charlotte Sometimes"	4:15

Side B
No.	Title	Length
1.	"Splintered in Her Head"	5:15

12" vinyl

Side A
No.	Title	Length
1.	"Charlotte Sometimes"	4:14
2.	"Splintered in Her Head"	5:16

Side B
No.	Title	Length
1.	"Faith (recorded live)"	10:33

== Personnel ==
- Robert Smith – vocals, electric guitar and synthesiser, harmonica on "Splintered in Her Head"
- Simon Gallup – bass guitar
- Lol Tolhurst – electronic drums
