= Cult Hero =

Cult Hero may refer to:

- a pseudonym used by an extended lineup of The Cure to release the 1979 single "I'm a Cult Hero"
- Cult Hero (film), a 2022 Canadian thriller film
- Cult Hero Records, an independent record label owned and operated by the rock band Voxtrot
- Hero cult
- a term utilized in sports, particularly association football, to describe a player or manager that has gained a cult following
