= Fools Dance =

English rock band, 1983–1987

- Fools Dance as pictured on their 1985 EP (L-R: Pete Gardner, Ron Howe, Gary Biddles, Simon Gallup, Stuart Curran)

Background information
- Origin: Horley, Surrey, England
- Genres: Punk rock, gothic rock, new wave
- Years active: 1983–1987
- Labels: Top Hole; Contorsion; Lambs to the Slaughter; Prism
- Past members: Gary Biddles; Stuart Curran; Simon Gallup; Pete Gardner; Ron Howe; Jean-Jacques Burnel; Campbell MacKellar; Paul Thompson

Fools Dance were an English rock band active from 1983 to 1987, primarily known for their connections to The Cure.

== History ==
In 1982, Simon Gallup was bassist for The Cure, and Gary Biddles was a member of the band's road crew who was occasionally invited to sing onstage. During the tour for the album Pornography, band relations had become contentious, and during a performance in Belgium, Biddles criticized other Cure members Robert Smith and Lol Tolhurst from the stage. Gallup then left the Cure acrimoniously and took Biddles with him.

Gallup formed a new band in 1983, originally known as The Cry, with singer Ian Fuller, guitarist Stuart Curran (formerly of The Magazine Spies), drummer Paul Thompson (formerly of Roxy Music), and keyboardist Matthieu Hartley (another former member of The Cure). This band only performed one gig in April 1983, after which all members other than Gallup and Curran quit.

The band was reformed under the name Fools Dance with Biddles on vocals, plus saxophonist Ron Howe, and (after using drum machines for a short period) drummer Pete Gardner. This lineup found little success in their native England, but developed a strong following in the Low Countries. At one show they were supported by The Cult. Frequent travel to Europe left the band little time for recording. An EP was recorded in 1983 but was not released until 1985, and was re-released several times in following years with minor alterations to the track list.

In late 1984, Biddles brokered a reconciliation between Gallup and Robert Smith. This resulted in Gallup leaving Fools Dance and rejoining the Cure, where he has remained ever since. Subsequently, Fools Dance broke up, with Biddles retaining the band name. Ron Howe later made a guest appearance on the Cure album The Head on the Door in 1985.

In 1987, Biddles reformed Fools Dance with bassist Jean-Jacques Burnel from The Stranglers, a returning Paul Thompson on drums, and guitarist Campbell McKellar. This lineup released the single "They'll Never Know" before the band dissolved once again. Biddles later joined the band Presence which had been formed by another former member of the Cure, Lol Tolhurst. Biddles died in 2013.

== Members ==
The Cry

- Stuart Curran – guitar
- Simon Gallup – bass
- Paul Thompson – drums
- Matthieu Hartley – keyboards
- Ian Fuller – vocals

Fools Dance

- Gary Biddles – vocals
- Stuart Curran – guitar
- Simon Gallup – bass
- Pete Gardner – drums
- Ron Howe – saxophone
- Jean-Jacques Burnel – bass
- Campbell MacKellar – guitar
- Paul Thompson – drums

== Discography ==
Cover of the 1987 single "They'll Never Know"

- Fools Dance (EP, 1985) – first released by Universal Productions, re-released with minor alterations by Top Hole Records in 1986, Contorsion in 1986, and Lambs to the Slaughter Records in 1987
- "They'll Never Know" (single, 1987) – released by Lambs to the Slaughter Records
