= House by the Sea =

House by the Sea can refer to:

- House by the Sea (album), a 2007 album by Levinhurst
- The House by the Sea (1924 film), a 1924 German film
- The House by the Sea (2017 film), a 2017 French film
- "House by the Sea", a song by Iron & Wine from the 2007 album The Shepherd's Dog
