= The Hanging Garden (song) =

Single by the Cure

from the album Pornography
- B-side: "Killing an Arab" (live); "A Forest" (live)
- Released: 12 July 1982
- Genre: Gothic rock
- Label: Fiction
- Songwriters: Robert Smith; Simon Gallup; Lol Tolhurst
- Producers: Chris Parry; Phil Thornalley; The Cure

The Cure singles chronology
"Charlotte Sometimes" (1981)	"The Hanging Garden" (1982)	"Let's Go to Bed" (1982)

"The Hanging Garden" is a song by English rock band the Cure, released as the sole single from their fourth studio album, Pornography. The release is sometimes referred to as A Single. The single reached No. 34 on the UK Singles Chart.

== Release ==
In addition to being issued as a 7-inch single with a live version of the Cure's earlier single "Killing an Arab" on the B-side, "The Hanging Garden" was also released in a deluxe edition known as A Single, formatted both as a gatefold double pack of 7-inch singles with a total of four tracks, and also as a 10-inch EP including a live recording of "Killing an Arab" and the studio version of "A Forest" from the group’s second album.

== Music video ==
The video shows the band playing in the York House Gardens in London, England. The band also wears masks, which is similar to the concept of the Pornography album. Robert Smith recalled: "For the 'Hanging Garden' video we got two people who did Madness videos but it was a really awful video. They wanted to make us look serious and we wanted them to make us look like Madness". The video was directed by Chris Gabrin.

== Reception ==
At the time of its release, NME writer Adrian Thrills was not impressed with the single, writing, "The Cure have drifted disappointingly and indulgently from the idyllic pop invention of their younger days". BBC Radio 1 DJ John Peel went on to include the song at No. 25 in his Festive Fifty list for 1982.

In a retrospective review for AllMusic, Stewart Mason wrote that the song was heavily influenced by Siouxsie and the Banshees. "The urgent, thundering drums that underpin 'The Hanging Garden' are clearly some sort of homage to Budgie, who provided very similar drum patterns to years' worth of Siouxsie & the Banshees songs. Similarly, Simon Gallup's bass borrows something from Steven Severin's insistent throb, and Smith's own guitar is primarily used for drones and ornamentation, much as it was in the Banshees".

== Popular culture ==
The live music and art precinct in central Hobart, 'In the Hanging Garden', was named after the song.

== Track listing ==
1. "The Hanging Garden"
2. "Killing an Arab" (live)

Double pack

Side A

1. "The Hanging Garden"
2. "One Hundred Years"

Side B – recorded April 27, 1982, at the Manchester Apollo

1. "A Forest" (live)
2. "Killing an Arab" (live)

== Personnel ==
- Simon Gallup – bass
- Robert Smith – guitar, keyboard, vocals
- Lol Tolhurst – drums
