= Primary (song) =

Single by the Cure

from the album Faith
- B-side: "Descent"
- Released: 28 March 1981
- Genre: Post-punk; gothic rock
- Length: 3:39 (7"); 5:56 (12")
- Label: Fiction
- Songwriters: Robert Smith; Simon Gallup; Lol Tolhurst
- Producers: Mike Hedges; Robert Smith

The Cure singles chronology
"A Forest" (1980)	"Primary" (1981)	"Charlotte Sometimes" (1981)

Music video
- "Primary" on YouTube

"Primary" is a song by the English rock band the Cure, released as the sole single from their third studio album, Faith, on 27 March 1981. It reached number 43 in the UK Singles Chart.

== Background ==
The song is unusual in that both Simon Gallup and Robert Smith play bass, with the effects pedals on Smith's giving the leads a unique sound. There are no guitars or keyboards played in the song.

== Release ==
"Primary" was the first song by The Cure to be remixed as a separate extended mix for release on 12" single (and not co-released on other formats, in the way the 12" version of "A Forest" was also the album version appearing on Seventeen Seconds, for example). In fact, the original 12" extended mix is, to this day, still only available on the original 12" single, which has never been reproduced on any other album, making it quite a rare item. The main difference between the 7" mix (also the album mix) and the 12" mix is that the extended mix lengthens the instrumental introductions to the song's verses.

== Critical reception ==
Upon the single release David Hepworth of Smash Hits expressed his admiration for Robert Smith and wondered "how long The Cure can continue to prop their songs against the same chord progression, with its clambering bass and deadpan drums."

== Track listing ==
7"

1. "Primary"
2. "Descent"

12"

1. "Primary (Extended)"
2. "Descent"

== Musicians ==
- Robert Smith – vocals, bass
- Simon Gallup – bass
- Lol Tolhurst – drums
