= The Peel Sessions (The Cure EP) =

EP by The Cure
- Released: 1988
- Recorded: 4 December 1978
- Genre: Post-punk
- Label: Strange Fruit
- Producer: Tony Wilson

The Cure chronology
Kiss Me, Kiss Me, Kiss Me (1987)	The Peel Sessions (1988)	Disintegration (1989)

Professional ratings
Review scores
Source	Rating
Allmusic	3/5 stars

The Peel Sessions was the 1988 EP release of the session The Cure recorded on 4 December 1978 for BBC Radio 1's John Peel show. The session was broadcast on 11 December 1978. The recordings were released on 12" vinyl, CD and cassette in 1988. Music journalist Jeff Apter has called the session "just the seal of credibility the band needed".

The EP reached number 7 on the UK Independent Singles Chart.

== Track listing ==
All songs were written by Smith, Tolhurst and Dempsey.

1. "Killing an Arab" – 2:31
2. "10.15 Saturday Night" – 3:48
3. "Fire in Cairo" – 3:20
4. "Boys Don't Cry" – 2:47

== Personnel ==
Personnel adapted from The Peel Sessions liner notes.

The Cure

- Robert Smith – lead vocals, guitar
- Mick Dempsey – bass, backing vocals
- Laurence Tolhurst – drums, backing vocals

Production

- Tony Wilson – production
