= Inside (Presence album) =

Studio album by Presence
- Released: 1992; 1993
- Recorded: 1991–1992
- Genres: Gothic rock; dream pop
- Length: 51:18 (1992 UK release); 55:45 (1993 US/Canada release); 1:31:05 (2011 MP3 version)
- Labels: Smash, Island
- Producer: Presence

Presence chronology
Inside (1992)	Closer (2014)

Alternative cover
- 1993 US version cover

Professional ratings
Review scores
Source	Rating
AllMusic	4/5 stars

Inside is the debut studio album released by British rock band Presence, released in the UK through Reality Records in 1992, and in the US and Canada through Smash Records, a subsidiary of Island Records, in 1993. Although Inside was well received by critics, it was a commercial failure, and the band dissolved shortly afterwards. Nevertheless, this band does spark interest among some Cure fans because of the involvement of Lol Tolhurst.

Tolhurst believes that Presence would may had a better chance of achieving commercial success had his reputation not been tied to that of The Cure. In his autobiography, Cured: The Tale of Two Imaginary Boys. Tolhurst writes:

"I believe the biggest impediment to us succeeding was the baggage that came with me. If it had been a new band that nobody knew, I think we might have got a different reaction. We were either too much like The Cure (surprise, surprise) or not enough. We couldn’t win.”

In December 2011, this album was made available in MP3 format through Amazon and iTunes.

== Reception ==
Staff writer Dave Thompson of AllMusic gave the album four out of five stars, writing "for anybody still reeling from the horrors of the Cure's own most recent releases, if Wish was the cure, then Inside was the plague with the built-in immunity."

In 2026, Uncut ranked Inside at number 114 on their list of "The 200 Greatest Goth Albums". The magazine described it as "inevitably" similar to the Cure but added that it "also contained plenty of Bunnymen glower, shoegaze groove and an arena-goth charm all its own."

== Track listing ==
All tracks written by Biddles, Tolhurst, and Youdell, except where noted.

UK version
No.	Title	Writer(s)	Length
1.	"Never"		4:23
2.	"Fragments"	Biddles, Dempsey, Tolhurst, Youdell	3:44
3.	"Act of Faith"		4:14
4.	"Revolve"		4:33
5.	"Highest Peak"	Biddles, Dempsey, Tolhurst, Youdell	5:34
6.	"Pause"		5:04
7.	"Raindown"		3:36
8.	"Missing"		4:19
9.	"On Ocean Hill"	Biddles, Burgess, Tolhurst, Youdell	4:58
10.	"All I See" (Omitted from vinyl version.)		5:02
11.	"Inside"		5:45

North American version
No.	Title	Writer(s)	Length
1.	"Never"		4:24
2.	"Fragments"	Biddles, Dempsey, Tolhurst, Youdell	3:40
3.	"Act of Faith"		4:02
4.	"On Ocean Hill"	Biddles, Burgess, Tolhurst, Youdell	5:05
5.	"Revolve"		4:29
6.	"Highest Peak"	Biddles, Dempsey, Tolhurst, Youdell	5:30
7.	"Pause"		5:00
8.	"Raindown"		3:38
9.	"Missing"		4:17
10.	"In Wonder"		4:16
11.	"All I See"		4:56
12.	"Inside"		5:43

2011 MP3 bonus tracks
No.	Title	Writer(s)	Length
12.	"Earthquake" (B-side of "Act of Faith")	Biddles, Dempsey, Tolhurst	4:42
13.	"In Wonder" (Stand-alone single in UK but included in the North American version.)		4:22
14.	"Distortion" (B-side of "All I See")		4:17
15.	"Soft" (B-side of both "Act of Faith" and "In Wonder")	Biddles, Dempsey, Tolhurst	5:14
16.	"Tomorrow" (B-side of "Act of Faith")	Biddles, Dempsey, Tolhurst	3:00
17.	"Amazed" (B-side of "All I See")	Biddles, Dempsey, Tolhurst	4:39
18.	"All I See (Butler/Walsh Mix)" (B-side of "All I See")		6:30
19.	"In Wonder (Millie Mix)" (B-side of "In Wonder")		7:08

== Personnel ==
Presence

- Gary Biddles — vocals
- Alan Burgess — drums
- Roberto Soave — bass guitar
- Rob Steen — guitar
- Laurence Tolhurst — keyboard
- Chris Youdell — keyboard

Production

- Produced by Presence
- Engineered by Jim Russell, assisted by Alex Byrd
- Mixed by Ingmar Kiang, assisted by Anthony Fisher
- Mastered by Greg Calbi
- Art direction – Deborah Melian
- Design and Logo – Rob Steen
- Artwork and Photography – Jeremy Baile and Darryl Schiff
