= Perfect Life =

Perfect Life may refer to:

- Perfect Life (Levinhurst album), 2004
- Perfect Life (Yoga Lin album), 2011
- "Perfect Life" (Levina song), 2017
- "Perfect Life", a song by Red from Release the Panic
- Perfect Life (film), a 2008 Chinese-Hong Kong film by Emily Tang
- The Perfect Life, a 2011 Italian comedy film
- Perfect Life (TV series), Spanish TV series (2019–).
