= Friday I'm in Love =

1992 single by the Cure

Single by the Cure

from the album Wish
- B-side: "Halo"; "Scared as You"
- Released: 15 May 1992
- Genre: Jangle pop; pop rock; indie pop; alternative rock
- Length: 3:38
- Label: Fiction
- Songwriters: Perry Bamonte; Boris Williams; Simon Gallup; Robert Smith; Porl Thompson
- Producers: David Allen; the Cure

The Cure singles chronology
"High" (1992)	"Friday I'm in Love" (1992)	"A Letter to Elise" (1992)

Music video
- "Friday I'm in Love" on YouTube

"Friday I'm in Love" is a song by British rock band the Cure. Released in May 1992 by Fiction Records as the second single from their ninth studio album, Wish (1992), the song became a worldwide hit, reaching number six in the UK and number 18 in the United States, where it also topped the Billboard Modern Rock Tracks chart. The accompanying music video was directed by Tim Pope, depicting the band performing on a soundstage. It also won the award for European Viewer's Choice for Best Music Video at the 1992 MTV Video Music Awards.

Robert Smith, the song's primary writer, described it in 1992 as both "a throw your hands in the air, let's get happy kind of record" and "a very naïve, happy type of pop song."

== Production ==
During the writing process, Robert Smith became convinced that he had inadvertently stolen the chord progression from somewhere, and this led him to a state of paranoia where he called everyone he could think of and played the song for them, asking if they had heard it before. None of them had, and Smith realised that the melody was indeed his. "It's always been paradoxical that it's pushed down people's throats that we're a goth band," Smith observed. "Because, to the general public, we're not. To taxi drivers, I'm the bloke that sings 'Friday I'm in Love'. I'm not the bloke who sings 'Shake Dog Shake' or 'One Hundred Years'."

The song was written to be a slower number than its upbeat final rendition. While the track was recorded in D major, the commercially released version sounds a quarter-tone higher (halfway between D and E-flat) due to Smith forgetting to disengage the vari-speed function on the multi-track recorder after toying with it before the final mixing process took place. When played live, the song is performed in its original intended key as opposed to the pitch discrepancy heard on the record. The track was produced by David M. Allen and the Cure.

== Release ==
"Friday I'm in Love" was the second single taken from the band's ninth studio album, Wish, and was released in the United Kingdom on 15 May 1992. Unusually, two formats of the song were released on a Friday instead of a Monday, so it debuted on the UK Singles Chart at a low number 31 on the chart week beginning 17 May. The following week, after the other two formats went on sale, the single rose to number eight and peaked at number six during its third week on the chart. As of 2026, it is the group's last UK top-10 hit. In the United States, the song reached number 18 on the Billboard Hot 100, giving the band their last American top-40 hit to date. It was also the band's last song (in a string of four) to top the Billboard Modern Rock Tracks chart, matching the success of their previous single, "High", with a four-week stint at number one.

== Music video ==
The music video for "Friday I'm in Love", directed by Tim Pope, features the band performing the song in front of various backdrops on a soundstage, in homage to French silent filmmaker Georges Méliès: the video features the appearance of characters from his The Eclipse, or the Courtship of the Sun and Moon. Throughout the video the band play with various props and costumes while several extras wander around, causing chaos and ultimately trashing the set.

Tim Pope makes a cameo at the beginning, riding a rocking horse and yelling out high-pitched stage directions through a plastic megaphone after inhaling helium from a balloon. The band's Japanese make-up artist also makes an appearance. The final shot is of bassist Simon Gallup crouching and peering into the camera while wearing a bridal veil and holding some champagne. The producer of "Friday I'm in Love", Dave M. Allen, makes an appearance in the background, also holding up props.

A notable oddity is the band's name on the drum—a scrawled "The Cures" rather than the band's singular name.

== Track listing ==
7-inch vinyl
No.	Title	Length
1.	"Friday I'm in Love"	3:36
2.	"Halo"	3:47

12-inch vinyl
No.	Title	Length
1.	"Friday I'm in Love" (Strangelove Mix)	5:29
2.	"Halo"	3:47
3.	"Scared as You"	4:12

CD
No.	Title	Length
1.	"Friday I'm in Love"	3:36
2.	"Halo"	3:47
3.	"Scared as You"	4:12
4.	"Friday I'm in Love" (Strangelove Mix)	5:29

== Personnel ==
- Robert Smith – vocals, guitar
- Simon Gallup – bass
- Porl Thompson – guitar
- Boris Williams – drums
- Perry Bamonte – six-string bass, keyboards

== Charts ==
=== Weekly charts ===
Weekly chart performance for "Friday I'm in Love"
Chart (1992–1993)	Peak position
Australia (ARIA)	39
Austria (Ö3 Austria Top 40)	13
Canada Top Singles (RPM)	3
Europe (Eurochart Hot 100)	20
Europe (European Hit Radio)	4
Germany (GfK)	16
Ireland (IRMA)	4
Netherlands (Single Top 100)	32
New Zealand (Recorded Music NZ)	7
Norway (VG-lista)	7
Sweden (Sverigetopplistan)	17
Switzerland (Schweizer Hitparade)	17
UK Singles (Official Charts)	6
UK Airplay (Music Week)	2
US Billboard Hot 100	18
US Alternative Airplay (Billboard)	1
US Dance Club Songs (Billboard)	32
US Dance Singles Sales (Billboard)	29
US Cash Box Top 100	18

=== Year-end charts ===
Year-end chart performance for "Friday I'm in Love"
Chart (1992)	Position
Brazil (Crowley)	83
Canada Top Singles (RPM)	42
Europe (Eurochart Hot 100)	97
Europe (European Hit Radio)	25
Germany (Media Control)	52
UK Airplay (Music Week)	36
US Billboard Hot 100	71
US Modern Rock Tracks (Billboard)	3

== Certifications ==
Certifications for "Friday I'm in Love"
Region	Certification	Certified units/sales
Denmark (IFPI Danmark)	Platinum	90,000^{‡}
Italy (FIMI)	Platinum	100,000^{‡}
New Zealand (RMNZ)	3× Platinum	90,000^{‡}
Spain (Promusicae)	2× Platinum	120,000^{‡}
United Kingdom (BPI)	3× Platinum	1,800,000^{‡}
^{‡} Sales+streaming figures based on certification alone.

== Release history ==
Release history for "Friday I'm in Love"
Region	Date	Label(s)	Ref.
United Kingdom	15 May 1992	Fiction	
Europe	18 May 1992	Fiction	
United States	28 May 1992	Elektra	
Japan	25 June 1992	Fiction	

== See also ==
- List of Billboard Modern Rock Tracks number ones of the 1990s
