= Levinhurst =

UK musical group

- Genres: Electronic, indie
- Years active: 2002–present
- Members: Cindy Levinson; Lol Tolhurst; Eric Bradley; Michael Dempsey
- Past members: Dayton Borders

Levinhurst is an English electronic band formed by keyboardist/drummer Lol Tolhurst, a founding member of the Cure, and his wife Cindy Levinson on vocals. The band's name is a portmanteau of their surnames. To date, Levinhurst has released three studio albums.

== History ==
The band was formed in 2002, with Tolhurst and Levinson assisted by guitarist/keyboardist Dayton Borders. Their debut album, Perfect Life, was released in 2004. This was followed in 2006 by an EP called The Grey, which featured a cover of the early Cure song "All Cats Are Grey". Their second full-length album, House by the Sea, was released in 2007. By this point, guitarist/bassist Eric Bradley had joined the band.

In 2009, Levinhurst was joined by another former member of the Cure, Michael Dempsey, on bass and keyboards. This lineup released the album Blue Star in 2009, with a guest appearance by Tolhurst and Levinson's then 16-year-old son Gray Tolhurst on guitar.

== Members ==
=== Current members ===
- Cindy Levinson - vocals (2002–present)
- Lol Tolhurst - drums, synthesizer, keyboards (2002–present)
- Eric Bradley - guitar, bass, backing vocals (2007–present)
- Michael Dempsey - bass, keyboards, guitar, string arrangements (2009–present)

=== Former members ===
- Dayton Borders - guitar, keyboards (2002–2005)

== Discography ==
=== Albums ===
- Perfect Life (2004)
- House by the Sea (2007)
- Blue Star (2009)

=== EPs ===
- The Grey (2006)
- Somewhere, Nothing Is Everything (2014)
