= I'm a Cult Hero =

Single by Cult Hero
- B-side: "I Dig You"
- Released: November 1979
- Recorded: 1979
- Genre: Post-punk
- Length: 6:24
- Label: Fiction
- Songwriter: Robert Smith
- Producer: Chris Parry

The Cure singles chronology
"Jumping Someone Else's Train" (1979)	"I'm a Cult Hero" (1979)	"A Forest" (1980)

"I'm a Cult Hero" is a song by an extended lineup of the Cure under the name Cult Hero. It was released as a single in November 1979.

== History ==
The single was conceived by Robert Smith (singer/guitarist of the Cure) and Simon Gallup (then bassist of the Magspies) as a way to test their musical compatibility. Smith was considering Gallup as a prospective replacement for Michael Dempsey (the Cure's bassist at the time), "whose personality and ambitions for the band were seriously at odds" with those of Smith.

The songs were written for, and feature on vocals, local Horley postman Frank Bell, who is also depicted on the single's artwork. They also feature Malice/Easy Cure guitarist Porl Thompson and Magspies keyboardist Matthieu Hartley amongst an extended lineup of friends and family, including Robert's sisters Janet and Margaret and local band the Obtainers.

=== After Cult Hero ===
Following the recording of the single in 1979, Gallup left the Magspies and joined the Cure, replacing Dempsey. At the same time, Matthieu Hartley also left the Magspies and joined the Cure as the group's first keyboardist.

Hartley ultimately left the Cure in 1980, after only one album, Seventeen Seconds, and its subsequent tour. Gallup also left the Cure in 1982, but then rejoined the band in 1984 and remains a member to the present day. Porl Thompson also rejoined the Cure between 1983 and 1992, and then again from 2005 to 2011.

== Releases ==
"I'm a Cult Hero" was originally released in December 1979 in the UK with the song "I Dig You" on the B-side.

Upon release in 1980 in Canada, and in 1981 in New Zealand, the tracks were flipped, with "I Dig You" as the A-side. The track "I'm a Cult Hero" was also included in the Australian compilation album Britannia Waives the Rules in 1981.

Both tracks are included in their original order in the 2005 deluxe edition of Seventeen Seconds. Also included are previously unreleased live recordings of both tracks, but in reverse order.

== Track listing ==
(Both tracks written by Robert Smith)

UK single

1. "I'm a Cult Hero" – 3:00
2. "I Dig You" – 3:24

Canadian/New Zealand single

1. "I Dig You" – 3:24
2. "I'm a Cult Hero" – 3:00

== Personnel ==
- Frank Bell – vocals
- Robert Smith – guitar
- Porl Thompson – guitar
- Simon Gallup – bass
- Lol Tolhurst – drums
- Michael Dempsey – keyboard
- Matthieu Hartley – keyboard
- Janet Smith – keyboard
- Margaret Smith – backing vocals
- The Obtainers – backing vocals
