= Why Can't I Be You? =

Single by the Cure

from the album Kiss Me, Kiss Me, Kiss Me
- B-side: "A Japanese Dream"
- Released: 6 April 1987
- Genre: New wave; pop; R&B
- Length: 3:14
- Label: Fiction
- Composers: Robert Smith; Simon Gallup; Porl Thompson; Boris Williams; Lol Tolhurst
- Lyricist: Robert Smith
- Producers: Robert Smith; Dave Allen

The Cure singles chronology
"Boys Don't Cry (New Voice)" (1986)	"Why Can't I Be You?" (1987)	"Catch" (1987)

Music video
- "Why Can't I Be You" (TopPop, 1987) on YouTube

"Why Can't I Be You?" is a song by the English rock band the Cure, released as the lead single on the 6 April 1987 from their album Kiss Me, Kiss Me, Kiss Me.

== History ==
"Why Can't I Be You?" was the first single released from the album Kiss Me, Kiss Me, Kiss Me—the band's seventh LP. On 14 April 1987, it peaked at number 21 on UK Singles Chart. In the United States that same year, the song reached number 54 on the Billboard Hot 100, while a remix of the track charted at numbers eight and 27 on the Hot Dance Music/Maxi-Singles Sales and the Dance Music/Club Play Singles charts, respectively.

== Music video ==
The video for "Why Can't I Be You?" was filmed in early 1987, in between rehearsals for the Cure's first South American tour. It was directed by Tim Pope, a past video collaborator of the group's. Filmed in a Ardmore Studios in Bray, County Wicklow, Ireland, the video featured the band members performing what biographer Jeff Apter referred to as "some of the most poorly choreographed dancing ever seen on MTV". All five band members wore costumes: Robert Smith dressed as a bear and as school-girl in a pinafore dress, Simon Gallup was costume as both a crow and a Morris dancer, Porl Thompson was a Scotsman as well as cross-dressed, Boris Williams was a schoolgirl & a vampire and Lol Tolhurst wore blackface and then a bumblebee costume. Pope referred to the clip as "the video I've always wanted to make".

== Reception ==
In the NME's review of the single, writer Donald McRae singled out Smith's voice as the sole element of the song that "doesn't shout 'TEEN FUN'". Nonetheless, he praised the band, and concluded, "Shameless and cheap enough to steal Wham's 'Young Guns' riff, this ditty will soon be another Top of the Pops cracker".

Stewart Mason of AllMusic described the song as having "the remarkable ability to be simultaneously incredibly catchy and frankly rather annoying", noting it as an " antic, herky-jerky" successor to previous singles such as "Let's Go to Bed" and "The Love Cats". Stephen Thomas Erlewine, also of Allmusic, called it "deceptively bouncy" and noted it as a high point of the album and helps make it "one of the group's very best". Michael Gallucci of Diffuser called the song "a whole lotta fun, dispelling the myth that the Cure are a bunch of moody sad sacks."

== Track listing ==
7"
Fiction / Fics 25 (UK)

1. "Why Can't I Be You?" (3:12)
2. "A Japanese Dream" (3:27)

2x7"
Fiction / Ficsg 25 (UK)

1. "Why Can't I Be You?" (3:13)
2. "A Japanese Dream" (3:30)
3. "Six Different Ways (Live)" (3:32)
4. "Push (Live)" (4:42)

Live tracks taken from the concert film The Cure in Orange

12"
Fiction / Ficsx 25 (UK)

1. "Why Can't I Be You? (12" Remix)" (7:58)
2. "A Japanese Dream (12" Remix)" (5:42)

Remixed by François Kevorkian and Ron St. Germain

CD Video / 080 184-2 (UK)

1. "Why Can't I Be You? (12" Remix)" (8:10)
2. "A Japanese Dream (12" Remix)" (5:52)
3. "Hey You!!!" (2:23)
4. "Why Can't I Be You? (Video)" (3:31)

Video directed by Tim Pope

== Personnel ==
- Robert Smith - Vocals, Guitar
- Porl Thompson - Guitar
- Simon Gallup - Bass
- Boris Williams - Drums
- François Kevorkian, Ron St. Germain - Remix

== Charts ==
=== Weekly charts ===
Chart (1987)	Peak position
Italy Airplay (Music & Media)	6
UK Singles Chart	21
Billboard Hot 100	54
Hot Dance Music/Maxi-Singles Sales	8
Dance Music/Club Play Singles	27
