= Kiss Me, Kiss Me, Kiss Me =

1987 studio album by the Cure

Studio album by the Cure
- Released: 26 May 1987
- Recorded: August 1986 – January 1987
- Studios: Miraval (Correns, France); Compass Point (Nassau, Bahamas) (Note: Saxophone parts)
- Genres: Alternative rock; new wave; pop; post-punk; gothic rock; neo psychedelia
- Length: 74:35
- Label: Fiction
- Producers: David M. Allen; Robert Smith

The Cure chronology
| Standing on a Beach (1986) | Kiss Me, Kiss Me, Kiss Me (1987) | The Peel Sessions (1988) |

Singles from Kiss Me Kiss Me Kiss Me
- 1. "Why Can't I Be You?" Released: 6 April 1987; 2. "Catch" Released: 22 June 1987; 3. "Just Like Heaven" Released: 5 October 1987; 4. "Hot Hot Hot!!!" Released: 8 February 1988

"Just Like Heaven" (1987)
Sample of The Cure song "Just Like Heaven"

Kiss Me, Kiss Me, Kiss Me is the seventh studio album by the English rock band the Cure, released on 26 May 1987 by Fiction Records. This double album was recorded at Studio Miraval in Correns, France. Robert Smith described the album as "like an end to what we've been doing for the last 10 years. It seemed to be like the singles album—literally a retrospective album. This one is taking bits from everything we've done, all the bits that I've liked. But there's a single album's worth of that and a single album's worth of stuff we've never really attempted before."

The album helped bring the Cure into the mainstream in the United States, becoming the band's first album to reach the top 40 of the Billboard 200 chart and achieving platinum certification. Like its predecessor, The Head on the Door, it was also a great international success, reaching the top 10 in numerous countries. Four singles were released from the album, including "Just Like Heaven", becoming the band's first top 40 hit in the United States and one of the band's most popular songs.

The album received mixed-to-positive reviews upon release, with praise for its eclectic nature, but criticism for its runtime. Retrospectively, the album has received critical acclaim, and is regarded by some as one of their best albums. In 2000, the album was voted number 256 in Colin Larkin's All Time Top 1000 Albums.

== Background ==
After the release of the band's prior album, The Head on the Door, the band continued to gain international popularity, spurred by the album's two singles, "In Between Days" and "Close to Me". Capitalising on this success, the band released the singles compilation Standing on a Beach in three formats (each with a different track listing and a specific title) in 1986, accompanied by a VHS and LaserDisc Staring at the Sea, which featured videos for each track on the compilation. The compilation entered the top 50 in the US, and peaked at number 4 in the UK, and saw the re-issue of three previous singles: "Boys Don't Cry", "Let's Go to Bed", and "Charlotte Sometimes". The band toured to support the compilation and released a live concert VHS and LaserDisc of the show, filmed in the south of France and called The Cure in Orange. In the meantime, in order to develop material for their next album, Kiss Me, Kiss Me, Kiss Me, Smith forced himself to write music for 15 days of each month, eventually creating the song that would become "Just Like Heaven".

== Writing, recording, and production ==
In August of 1986, the band moved to Jean Costa's studio in Draguignan for a two-week pre-production session to refine demos recorded earlier that summer in London. Smith recounted that the demos were the result of soliciting each band member for their own musical ideas and getting "six or seven songs from each one" on a series of cassettes, before winnowing down to a shortlist via full-band vote, marking a shift from Smith's previous top-down control over composition.

After Draguignan, The Cure decamped to the residential setting of Studio Miraval for the three-month album recording session, where according to Smith they emphasized spontaneity, "almost jamming the songs to get the right feel", experimenting with Mediterranean sounds, and recording in one or two takes with minimal rehearsal. The band decided during the course of the session that they had an adequate surplus of strong material to justify releasing a double LP. Smith mixed the album with co-producer David M. Allen and engineer Michel Dierickx during sessions in December 1986 at Compass Point, Bahamas and January 1987 at ICP Recording Studios, Belgium, respectively.

== Sleeve design and art direction ==
The band collaborated with Andy Vella again, who designed all of their previous album covers starting with Faith (1981). While the band were touring in Brazil, Vella was asked to fly to Rio de Janeiro before he had finished the cover, in order to get it approved for the album. The cover is a photo of Robert Smith's lipstick covered lips. While on a taxi to the airport, Vella experimented with the layout of the cover, deciding on the placement of the handwritten words, which were on a separate clear plastic sheet. However, due to a speed bump jolting the taxi, the sheet was placed on the top middle of the sleeve. Vella was not certain of the placement, but sellotaped them there as a last minute option. Despite his uncertainties, when he arrived in Brazil to show Robert Smith the design, Smith said he loved the sleeve and the placement of the type.

== Release ==
Kiss Me, Kiss Me, Kiss Me was released on 26 May 1987 by Fiction Records in the UK and on 3 June 1987 by Elektra in the USA and Canada. Though a double album in its vinyl issue, it was released as a single CD and single cassette. One track, "Hey You!!!", was omitted from the original CD release because of the 74:33 Red Book CD time restriction, but was included on all cassette releases. A limited vinyl edition came with a bonus six-track, orange 12" featuring the songs "Sugar Girl", "Snow in Summer", "Icing Sugar" (Weird Remix), "A Japanese Dream", "Breathe" and "A Chain of Flowers".

The album appeared in August 2006 in both single-disc and deluxe double-disc CD editions as part of a Cure reissue campaign. All editions notably included "Hey You!!!", marking the first time a complete version of the album was made available on CD. The second disc of the deluxe edition is composed of demos and live versions of album tracks, including a recording of "Why Can't I Be You?" from the final show of the Kissing Tour at the Wembley Arena. Robert Smith stated on his website that there was so much material to draw from that he initially compiled a three-disc edition, with the third disc containing alternate studio versions of the album's songs. However, after discussing with family and friends, he decided that the two-disc edition was a better choice for release. Smith said that it was possible that his proposed third disc may surface as a leak or in a future release.

== Critical reception ==
Professional ratings
Review scores
| Source | Rating |
|---|---|
| AllMusic | 4/5 stars |
| Blender | 5/5 stars |
| Chicago Sun-Times | 3/4 stars |
| Los Angeles Times | 3/4 stars |
| Pitchfork | 9.4/10 |
| Q | 4/5 stars |
| The Rolling Stone Album Guide | 4/5 stars |
| Sounds | 4.5/5 stars |
| Uncut | 4/5 stars |
| The Village Voice | B |

=== Contemporary ===
In a contemporary review, Mark Coleman of Rolling Stone praised the album for its developed sound saying "The Cure is trying to deepen and refine an existing sensibility rather than reach outward to expand it" and noted the whole band's greater contribution to the album, concluding "Kiss Me is a breakthrough all right. For the first time, the Cure's music is relatively unfettered by pretension and indulgence, and the results are remarkable." Chris Heath of Q praised the album for its variety, saying, "It covers so much ground that people used to music that carefully steers you on a clear path through sweeping gestures and bold statements -like, say, U2-might find Kiss Me... a bit of a mess. They might even be right-but what a remarkable mess it is."

Chris Willman of Los Angeles Times observed, "For all its unevenness, “Kiss Me” is a welcome step away from the existential gloom-monster image the Cure has cultivated. The band still sounds like the Velvet Underground meeting Emo Philips in a dimly lit post-punk disco, but with an even wider variety of influences and instrumentation in the mix.", citing "Why Can't I Be You?" and "Just Like Heaven" as highlights, but was critical of the songs with longer running times. Robert Christgau of The Village Voice criticised the album for its repetitive song structures, but noted "Because Smith hasn't veered this far pop since he was a boy, most of the themes stick with you, and in a few cases--my pick is "Just Like Heaven", which gets off to a relatively quick start--his romantic vagaries have universal potential."

=== Retrospective ===
In a retrospective review, Stephen Thomas Erlewine of AllMusic wrote that the record was "more accessible and ambitious". He further opined that: "Even if Kiss Me doesn't quite gel, its best moments ... are remarkable and help make the album one of the group's very best." Barry Walsh of Slant Magazine was mostly positive of the album, saying "with Kiss Me Kiss Me Kiss Me, the Cure gives the listener the kind of roller-coaster rush that only great pop can provide." Douglas Wolk of Blender praised its sound and noted the newfound success the band were embracing at the time, saying "they beefed up their production (orchestral synths! horns!) and made this double-album monument to teenage hormones, with just the right proportion of romance and revulsion" and concluding, "almost every song is a neatly arranged bouquet of roses or a bag of thorns." Ian Wade of the BBC described it as "one of only two listenable double albums in 1987 – the other being Prince's seismic Sign o' the Times – it cemented Robert Smith and chums' position", as well as calling it "a true delight". Ned Raggett of The Quietus also claimed "1987 really was a great year for double albums – just ask Prince. And Kiss Me Kiss Me Kiss Me is right up there." Raggett also noted Smith's lyricism as "able to move beyond strict personal/autobiographical depictions or I/you interactions to consider something a little more complicated, perhaps a touch more 'real' if you like."

Retrospectively, Uproxx ranked the album the second best album by the Cure, while NME ranked it their fifth best album. Nitsuh Abebe of Pitchfork called it the band's greatest and most definitive work, saying, "Every major mode of the Cure is here, and sounding better than ever, each one a realm of its own" and arguing that the album encompassed "the whole breadth of the Cure—and what seems like the whole head of Smith—in one glorious package". The Toronto Star also called it the band's "definitive statement", saying "It's also the toughest argument one can mount that there has never been a single 'Cure sound', but rather a steady, restless collage of – to borrow a later album title – 'wild mood swings' that all found their finest expressions here." Slant Magazine included it on their 2003 list of 50 Essential Pop Albums.

== Track listing ==
All lyrics are written by Robert Smith; all music is composed by the Cure (Smith, Simon Gallup, Porl Thompson, Lol Tolhurst and Boris Williams).

Side A
| No. | Title | Length |
|---|---|---|
| 1. | "The Kiss" | 6:17 |
| 2. | "Catch" | 2:42 |
| 3. | "Torture" | 4:13 |
| 4. | "If Only Tonight We Could Sleep" | 4:50 |

Side B
| No. | Title | Length |
|---|---|---|
| 1. | "Why Can't I Be You?" | 3:11 |
| 2. | "How Beautiful You Are..." | 5:10 |
| 3. | "The Snakepit" | 6:56 |
| 4. | "Hey You!!!" | 2:22 |

Side C
| No. | Title | Length |
|---|---|---|
| 1. | "Just Like Heaven" | 3:30 |
| 2. | "All I Want" | 5:18 |
| 3. | "Hot Hot Hot!!!" | 3:32 |
| 4. | "One More Time" | 4:29 |
| 5. | "Like Cockatoos" | 3:38 |

Side D
| No. | Title | Length |
|---|---|---|
| 1. | "Icing Sugar" | 3:48 |
| 2. | "The Perfect Girl" | 2:34 |
| 3. | "A Thousand Hours" | 3:21 |
| 4. | "Shiver and Shake" | 3:26 |
| 5. | "Fight" | 4:27 |
| Total length: | | 74:35 |

2006 Deluxe Edition bonus disc: Rarities 1986 – 1987
| No. | Title | Notes | Length |
|---|---|---|---|
| 1. | "The Kiss" (RS Home Demo) | 3/86; Instrumental | 3:40 |
| 2. | "The Perfect Girl" (Studio Demo) | Beethoven St. Studio Demo 6/86; Instrumental | 3:26 |
| 3. | "Like Cockatoos" (Studio Demo) | Beethoven St. Studio Demo 6/86; Instrumental | 2:11 |
| 4. | "All I Want" (Studio Demo) | Beethoven St. Studio Demo 6/86; Instrumental | 3:33 |
| 5. | "Hot Hot Hot!!!" (Studio Demo) | Beethoven St. Studio Demo 6/86; Instrumental | 3:49 |
| 6. | "Shiver and Shake" (Studio Demo) | Jean Costas Studio Demo 8/86; Instrumental | 2:55 |
| 7. | "If Only Tonight We Could Sleep" (Studio Demo) | Jean Costas Studio Demo 8/86; Instrumental | 3:16 |
| 8. | "Just Like Heaven" (Studio Demo) | Jean Costas Studio Demo 8/86; Instrumental | 3:26 |
| 9. | "Hey You!" (Studio Demo) | Jean Costas Studio Demo 8/86; Instrumental | 2:32 |
| 10. | "A Thousand Hours" (Studio Alt Mix) | Miraval Studio Guide Vocal/Rough Mix 10/86 | 3:27 |
| 11. | "Icing Sugar" (Studio Alt Mix) | Miraval Studio Guide Vocal/Rough Mix 10/86 | 3:20 |
| 12. | "One More Time" (Studio Alt Mix) | Miraval Studio Guide Vocal/Rough Mix 10/86 | 4:36 |
| 13. | "How Beautiful You Are..." (Live Bootleg) | County Bowl Santa Barbara 7/87 | 5:22 |
| 14. | "The Snakepit" (Live Bootleg) | County Bowl Santa Barbara 7/87 | 7:30 |
| 15. | "Catch" (Live Bootleg) | NEC Birmingham 12/87 | 2:32 |
| 16. | "Torture" (Live Bootleg) | NEC Birmingham 12/87 | 4:04 |
| 17. | "Fight" (Live Bootleg) | audience recording – Bercy Paris 12/87 | 4:30 |
| 18. | "Why Can't I Be You?" (Live Bootleg) | audience recording – Wembley Arena London 12/87 | 7:43 |

== Personnel ==
- Robert Smith – vocals, guitar, keyboards, production
- Simon Gallup – bass guitar
- Porl Thompson – guitar, keyboards, saxophone
- Lol Tolhurst – keyboards
- Boris Williams – drums, percussion
- Andrew Brennen – saxophone on "Icing Sugar"
- Roger O'Donnell – keyboards on live tracks from the deluxe edition
- David M. Allen – production
- Sean Burrows – assistant production
- Jacques Hermet – assistant production
- Bob Clearmountain – remixing for single version of "Just Like Heaven"

== Charts ==
=== Weekly charts ===
Weekly chart performance for Kiss Me, Kiss Me, Kiss Me
| Chart (1987) | Peak position |
|---|---|
| Australian Albums (Kent Music Report) | 9 |
| Austrian Albums (Ö3 Austria) | 4 |
| Canada Top Albums/CDs (RPM) | 30 |
| Dutch Albums (Album Top 100) | 3 |
| European Albums (Music & Media) | 4 |
| Finnish Albums (Suomen virallinen lista) | 25 |
| German Albums (Offizielle Top 100) | 4 |
| Italian Albums (Musica e dischi) | 13 |
| New Zealand Albums (RMNZ) | 14 |
| Swedish Albums (Sverigetopplistan) | 13 |
| Swiss Albums (Schweizer Hitparade) | 3 |
| UK Albums (Official Charts) | 6 |
| US Billboard 200 | 35 |

| Chart (2026) | Peak position |
|---|---|
| Greek Albums (IFPI) | 17 |

=== Year-end charts ===
Year-end chart performance for Kiss Me, Kiss Me, Kiss Me
| Chart (1987) | Position |
|---|---|
| Australian Albums (Kent Music Report) | 63 |
| Austrian Albums (Ö3 Austria) | 29 |
| Dutch Albums (Album Top 100) | 41 |
| European Albums (Music & Media) | 21 |
| German Albums (Offizielle Top 100) | 40 |
| Swiss Albums (Schweizer Hitparade) | 25 |
| US Billboard 200 | 100 |

== Certifications and sales ==
Certifications and sales for Kiss Me, Kiss Me, Kiss Me
| Region | Certification | Certified units/sales |
|---|---|---|
| France (SNEP) | Gold | 100,000^{*} |
| New Zealand (RMNZ) | Gold | 7,500^{‡} |
| Portugal (AFP) | Gold | 20,000^{^} |
| United Kingdom (BPI) | Gold | 100,000^{^} |
| United States (RIAA) | Platinum | 1,000,000^{^} |
Summaries
| Worldwide | — | 2,000,000 |
^{*} Sales figures based on certification alone.^{^} Shipments figures based on certification alone.^{‡} Sales+streaming figures based on certification alone.
