= High (The Cure song) =

1992 single by the Cure

Single by the Cure

from the album Wish
- B-side: "This Twilight Garden"; "Play"
- Released: 16 March 1992
- Genre: Alternative pop
- Length: 3:34
- Label: Fiction
- Songwriters: Boris Williams; Perry Bamonte; Simon Gallup; Robert Smith; Porl Thompson
- Producers: David Allen; the Cure

The Cure singles chronology
"Close to Me" (remix) (1990)	"High" (1992)	"Friday I'm in Love" (1992)

"High" is a song by English rock band the Cure, released on 16 March 1992 by Fiction Records as the lead single from their ninth album, Wish (1992). The track received mostly positive reviews and was commercially successful, reaching number one on the US Billboard Modern Rock Tracks chart, number six on the Irish Singles Chart, and number eight on the UK Singles Chart. It charted within the top five in Australia, Italy, New Zealand and Portugal.

== Critical reception ==
An article published by Evening Standard ranked "High" as the 11th-best Cure song, calling its lyrics "dexterous and playful" and describing the song in its entirety as a "lovable thing". Larry Flick of Billboard magazine also gave the song a positive review, calling it "subtle but infectious". Conversely, Michael Gallucci of Diffuser described the song as "kinda blah".

== Track listings ==
- 7-inch single

A. "High" – 3:34
B. "This Twilight Garden" – 4:43

- 12-inch single

A1. "High" (Higher mix)
B1. "This Twilight Garden"
B2. "Play"

- Maxi-CD single
1. "High" (single mix)
2. "This Twilight Garden"
3. "Play"
4. "High" (Higher mix)
- US CD single
1. "High" (single mix) – 3:34
2. "Open" – 6:51

== Personnel ==
- Robert Smith – vocals, 6-string bass, keyboards
- Simon Gallup – bass
- Porl Thompson – guitar
- Boris Williams – drums
- Perry Bamonte – 6-string bass, keyboard
- Mark Saunders – remixing

== Charts ==
=== Weekly charts ===
Weekly chart performance for "High"
Chart (1992)	Peak position
Australia (ARIA)	5
Austria (Ö3 Austria Top 40)	27
Belgium (Ultratop 50 Flanders)	21
Canada Top Singles (RPM)	41
Europe (Eurochart Hot 100)	13
France (SNEP)	11
Germany (GfK)	14
Ireland (IRMA)	6
Italy (Musica e dischi)	4
Netherlands (Dutch Top 40)	35
Netherlands (Single Top 100)	37
New Zealand (Recorded Music NZ)	4
Portugal (AFP)	2
Spain (AFYVE)	19
Sweden (Sverigetopplistan)	18
Switzerland (Schweizer Hitparade)	14
UK Singles (Official Charts)	8
UK Singles (Official Charts) "High" (remix)	44
UK Airplay (Music Week)	19
US Billboard Hot 100	42
US Alternative Airplay (Billboard)	1
US Dance Club Songs (Billboard)	22
US Dance Singles Sales (Billboard)	27
US Cash Box Top 100	33

=== Year-end charts ===
Year-end chart performance for "High"
Chart (1992)	Position
Europe (Eurochart Hot 100)	75
US Modern Rock Tracks (Billboard)	24

== Release history ==
Release dates and formats for "High"
Region	Date	Format(s)	Label(s)	Ref(s).
United Kingdom	16 March 1992	7-inch vinyl; 12-inch vinyl; CD; cassette	Fiction	
United States	16 March 1992	Modern rock radio; CD	Fiction; Elektra	
Japan	25 April 1992	CD	Fiction	

== See also ==
- Number one modern rock hits of 1992
