= House by the Sea (album) =

Studio album by Levinhurst
- Released: April 17, 2007
- Genre: Electronica
- Length: 36:01
- Label: What Are Records?

Levinhurst chronology
The Grey (2006)	House by the Sea (2007)	Blue Star (2009)

Professional ratings
Review scores
Source	Rating
Allmusic	3/5 stars

House by the Sea is the second studio album of Levinhurst, released in 2007.

== Reception ==
Margaret Reges of Allmusic gave it 3 out of 5 stars, writing "House by the Sea is graced with a continuity and vision that surpasses its predecessor. Unfortunately, there's a fine line between continuity and humdrum homogeneity, and House by the Sea bumbles into the realm of sleep-inducing monotony by the time the fifth track rolls around."

== Track listing ==
1. "Nobody Cares" (4:27)
2. "Never Going to Dream Again" (3:57)
3. "Beautiful Lie" (5:35)
4. "Unreality" (1:35)
5. "I Am" (2:59)
6. "Heart and Soul" (4:22)
7. "Another Way" (4:19)
8. "Forgiven" (4:38)
9. "House by the Sea" (4:09)

== Personnel ==
- Cindy Levinson - vocals
- Lol Tolhurst - keyboards, drums, synthesizer
- Eric Bradley - acoustic, electric, and bass guitars
- Gray Tolhurst - guitar
