= Matthieu Hartley =

British keyboardist

- Born: 4 February 1960 (age 65); Smallfield, Surrey, England
- Genres: Punk rock; post-punk; gothic rock; alternative rock
- Occupation: Musician
- Instrument: Keyboards
- Years active: 1979–present
- Formerly of: Lockjaw (1977–1978); The Magazine Spies (1978–1979); The Cure (1979–1980); Fools Dance (1983)
- Website: www.thecure.com

Matthieu Hartley (born 4 February 1960) is an English musician, best known as the keyboardist for The Cure from 1979–1980.

== Biography ==
Hartley was born in Smallfield, England, near Crawley, and was a childhood friend of future bandmate Simon Gallup. Hartley and Gallup were both members of the punk bands Lockjaw and the Magazine Spies in the late 1970s. These bands often played alongside early versions of the Cure.

Near the end of 1979, The Cure needed a new bassist following the departure of founding member Michael Dempsey, and recruited Gallup for the position. Gallup suggested adding Hartley as the band's first full-time keyboardist to broaden their sound.

Hartley was a full member of the Cure for their 1980 album Seventeen Seconds and the ensuing tour. During this period he contributed to the brief Cure side project Cult Hero. He left the band later that year due to disagreements with group leader Robert Smith, and dissatisfaction with the minimalist keyboard requirements in Smith's songs.

After leaving the Cure, Hartley remained friends with Gallup and was an early member of the band that became Fools Dance. He released a solo album under the name Matthieu in 1987, and in 2005 joined the psychedelic rock band The Speak.
