= Villa Beau Site =

Coordinates: 43.6896°N 7.2958°E

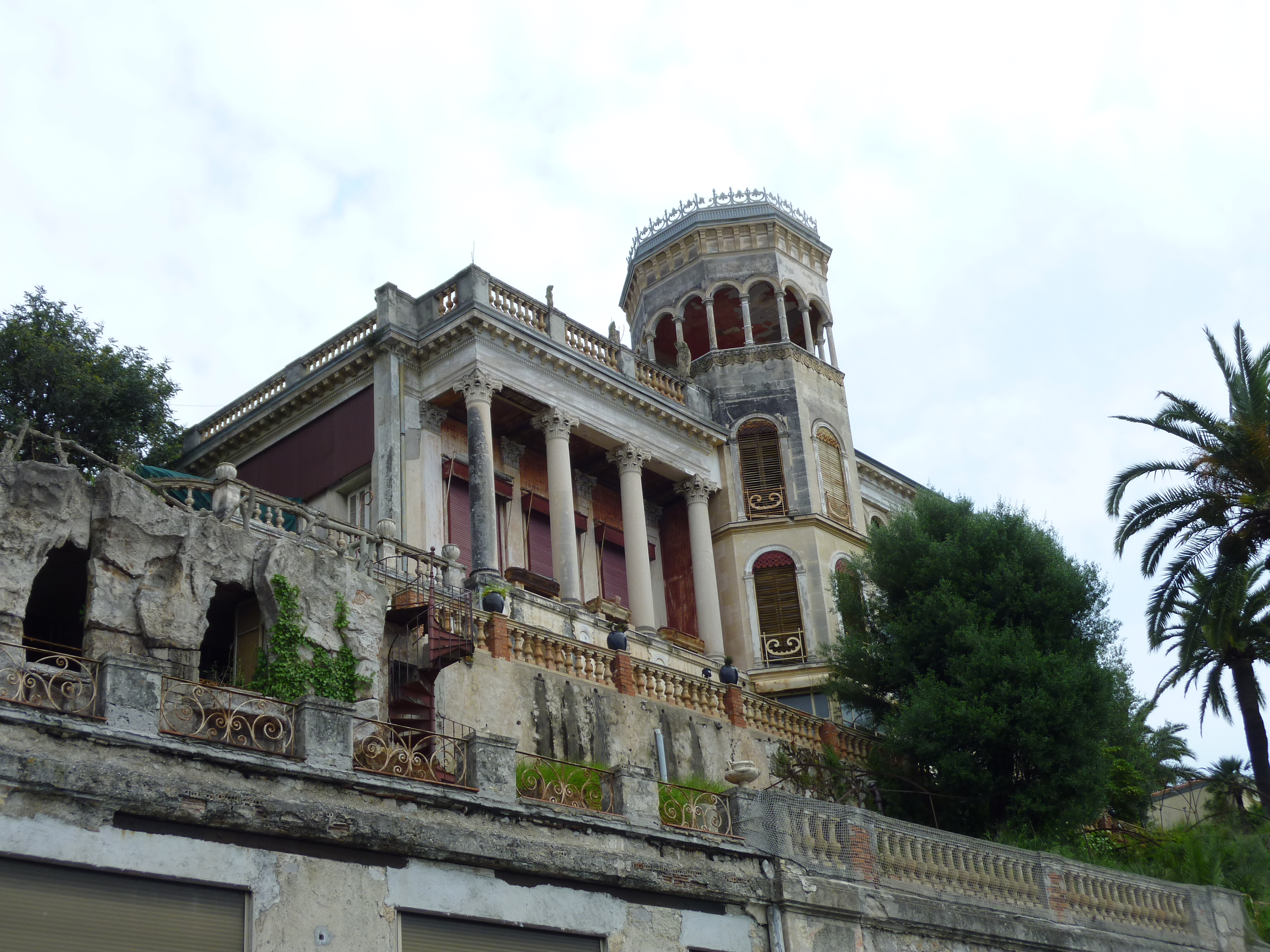
Villa Beau Site.

Villa Beau Site is a historic mansion in Nice, Alpes-Maritimes, France. It was built from 1885 to 1890, and it was designed by architect Sébastien-Marcel Biasini. The mansion was the temporary home of Czech composer Bohuslav Martinů, after his return to Europe from the USA in 1954. It has been listed as an official national monument since July 27, 1987.
