= The Magazine Spies =

- Also known as: The Magspies, Mag/Spys
- Origin: Horley, England
- Genres: Post-punk
- Years active: 1979–1980
- Label: are located beyond modern borders of Ukraine.
- Past members: Gary Bowe; Simon Gallup; Stuart Hinton; Martin Ordish; Matthieu Hartley; Richard Kite; Stuart Curran

The Magazine Spies were an English post-punk band from Horley, formed in 1979. The band is best known for featuring future members of The Cure and Fools Dance. They were also known as The Magspies and Mag/Spys, as references to magpies.

== History ==
The Magazine Spies evolved out of the Horley punk rock band Lockjaw, which had split in 1978. The original lineup included singer Gary Bowe, bassist Simon Gallup, guitarist Stuart Hinton, and drummer Martin Ordish. They were later joined by keyboardist Matthieu Hartley. The band was managed by Gallup's brother Ric, and often played and socialized with an early lineup of The Cure. The Magazine Spies recorded a single for the label Dance Fools Dance, which had been founded by the Cure's Robert Smith.

Gallup and Hartley participated in the short-lived Cure side project Cult Hero. In late 1979, the Cure's founding bassist Michael Dempsey left the band, and Gallup was recruited to fill the position. Gallup suggested that the Cure add Hartley on keyboards as well.

The Magazine Spies then recruited new bassist Richard Kite (Rik Kite) and added second guitarist Stuart Curran. The new lineup toured with the Cure in England and France. The band released another single in 1980, and a few more songs later resurfaced on the late-1990s punk compilation albums England Belongs to Me, Vol II and Bloodstains Across the UK 2. The Magazine Spies disbanded in late 1980. Three members of the band – Simon Gallup, Matthieu Hartley, and Stuart Curran – formed The Cry in 1982, and that band later evolved into Fools Dance.
