= Wish (The Cure album) =

1992 studio album by the Cure

Studio album by the Cure
- Released: 21 April 1992
- Recorded: Fall 1991 – January 1992
- Studios: The Manor (Shipton-on-Cherwell, England)
- Genres: Alternative rock; gothic rock; jangle pop; shoegaze
- Length: 66:23
- Label: Fiction
- Producers: David M. Allen; the Cure

The Cure chronology
Entreat (1991)	Wish (1992)	Show (1993)

Singles from Wish
- 1. "High" Released: 16 March 1992; 2. "Friday I'm in Love" Released: 15 May 1992; 3. "A Letter to Elise" Released: 5 October 1992

Wish is the ninth studio album by the English rock band the Cure (Note: The album cover omits the definite article entirely, opting to use “Cure” in all lowercase instead.), released on 21 April 1992 by Fiction Records in the United Kingdom and Elektra Records in the United States. Wish was the most commercially successful album in the band's career, debuting at number one in the UK and number two in the US.

On 25 November 2022, a remastered 30th-anniversary deluxe edition of Wish was released, containing four previously unreleased demos with vocals, instrumental demos, the Lost Wishes instrumental cassette and remix versions.

== Recording ==
The record is the final studio album by the Cure to feature drummer Boris Williams and the first to feature guitarist/keyboardist Perry Bamonte, who previously worked as a roadie for the band, as well as being the last album to feature guitarist Porl Thompson for 16 years.

Whilst retaining their trademark gothic rock sound and mood on some tracks, Wish often found the band emphasizing the lighter, broader guitar-driven alternative rock direction that was hinted on their previous three records. After recording several demos in early 1991, the official recording sessions for the album commenced in September 1991 and lasted around six months. According to Thompson, Wish was recorded on 48 tracks and "almost everything was used". Robert Smith also revealed the hit song "Friday I'm in Love" was accidentally sped up a quarter-tone sharp on the tape, halfway between D and E-flat. Smith commented on the speeding up of the tape of the song in a 1993 interview: "[…] that was an accident. I was playing with the vari-speed and forgot to turn it off. But the whole feel changed, and the fact that it's the only song on Wish that's not in concert pitch really lifts it out and makes it sound different. After working on the record for months, hearing something a quarter-tone off makes your brain take a step backwards." Smith also revealed that the "detuning" of the guitars played a role in the unique "sound" of the album, as did the subliminal overdubs and the extensive use of feedback. "A lot of things on our record that sound like heavy chorusing are actually just detuned instruments. The only drawback to that is onstage it's very confusing sometimes, especially with lots of phasing effects going on. It turns into this overwhelming pulsing sound, and you can't hear anything."

Smith also revealed that the songs "Mesmerise" by Chapterhouse and "Human" by The Human League were an influence on the album, commenting on both songs in 1993: "For every album we do, I assemble a bunch of songs that have something that I'm trying to capture. For Wish, I would listen to 'Mesmerise' by Chapterhouse for its feeling of abandon and 'Human' by The Human League. You couldn't spot anything sonically or structurally that would influence anything we did, but there's an indefinable something that I'm trying to capture. One night I must have played 'Mesmerise' 20 times, drinking and turning it louder and louder, putting myself into a trance."

== Release ==
Professional ratings
Review scores
Source	Rating
AllMusic	4/5 stars
Chicago Tribune	3/4 stars
Christgau's Consumer Guide	C+
Entertainment Weekly	B
Los Angeles Times	2/4 stars
NME	8/10
Pitchfork	8.4/10
Q	4/5 stars
Rolling Stone	4/5 stars
Select	5/5

The album's lead single was "High", released on 16 March 1992. The single peaked at number eight on the UK Singles Chart, number 42 on the US Billboard Hot 100, and number one on the Billboard Modern Rock Tracks chart. The album's second single, "Friday I'm in Love", was released on 15 May 1992, a Friday, later reaching number six on the UK Singles Chart, number 18 on the Billboard Hot 100, and number one on the Modern Rock Tracks chart. The final single was "A Letter to Elise", issued on 5 October 1992. This song reached number 28 in the UK and number two on the Modern Rock Tracks chart.

Wish was released on 21 April. It received positive reviews upon release, including a four-star review in Rolling Stone that stated: "For its cult of millions, the Cure offers the only kind of optimism that makes sense." Wish was also the band's overall highest-charting album, and most commercially successful in the band's career. Upon release, Wish would soon debut at number one on the UK Albums Chart, and number two on the US Billboard 200. It also reached number one on Cash Box's Top 200 Pop Albums chart in the US on 16 May 1992. Wish was nominated for the Grammy Award for Best Alternative Music Album in 1993.

On 16 November 1993, a limited-edition EP titled Lost Wishes was released on cassette with four new tracks on it. In 1995, Q included Wish in its publication "In Our Lifetime: Q's 100 Best Albums 1986–94", a list compiled to celebrate its 100th issue. In 2000 it was voted number 646 in Colin Larkin's All Time Top 1000 Albums.

== Reissues ==
On 13 April 2018, in an interview with BBC Radio 6 Music, Robert Smith confirmed that the deluxe edition of Wish had been finished. On 28 July 2022, the band announced a remastered and expanded 30th-anniversary deluxe edition of Wish, releasing it on 25 November 2022. The 30th-anniversary edition contains 24 previously unreleased demos, out-takes, the Lost Wishes EP and a collection of 12-inch remixes of all three singles from the Wish period. The recordings were remastered by Smith and Miles Showell at Abbey Road Studios.

== Track listing ==
All songs written by the Cure (Perry Bamonte, Simon Gallup, Robert Smith, Porl Thompson, Boris Williams).

No.	Title	Length
1.	"Open"	6:51
2.	"High"	3:37
3.	"Apart"	6:40
4.	"From the Edge of the Deep Green Sea"	7:44
5.	"Wendy Time"	5:13
6.	"Doing the Unstuck"	4:24
7.	"Friday I'm in Love"	3:39
8.	"Trust"	5:33
9.	"A Letter to Elise"	5:14
10.	"Cut"	5:55
11.	"To Wish Impossible Things"	4:43
12.	"End"	6:45

=== 2022 deluxe edition ===
Disc 2: Demos
No.	Title	Details	Length
1.	"The Big Hand" (1990 demo)	final version on B-side to "A Letter to Elise" 7-inch	4:38
2.	"Cut" (1990 demo aka "Away")	final version appears on Wish	3:31
3.	"A Letter to Elise" (1990 demo, aka "Cut")	final version appears on Wish	5:01
4.	"Wendy Time" (1990 demo)	final version appears on Wish	5:13
5.	"This Twilight Garden" (instrumental demo)	final version on B-side to "High" 7-inch	3:25
6.	"Scared as You" (instrumental demo)	final version on B-side to "Friday I'm in Love" 12-inch	2:33
7.	"To Wish Impossible Things" (instrumental demo)	final version appears on Wish	3:33
8.	"Apart" (instrumental demo)	final version appears on Wish	3:38
9.	"T7" (instrumental demo)	previously unreleased	2:40
10.	"Now Is the Time" (instrumental demo)	previously unreleased	2:20
11.	"Miss van Gogh" (instrumental demo)	previously unreleased	2:48
12.	"T6" (instrumental demo)	previously unreleased	3:14
13.	"Play" (instrumental demo)	final version on B-side to "High" 12-inch	2:28
14.	"A Foolish Arrangement" (instrumental demo)	final version on B-side to "A Letter to Elise" 12-inch	2:28
15.	"Halo" (instrumental demo)	final version on B-side to "Friday I'm in Love" 7-inch	3:06
16.	"Trust" (instrumental demo)	final version appears on Wish	4:02
17.	"Abetabw" (instrumental demo)	previously unreleased	2:26
18.	"T8" (instrumental demo)	previously unreleased	2:17
19.	"Heart Attack" (instrumental demo)	previously unreleased	2:41
20.	"Swing Change" (instrumental demo)	previously unreleased	2:10
21.	"Frogfish" (instrumental demo)	previously unreleased	2:35

Disc 3: Lost Wishes, studio out-takes, 12-inch remixes, live, rare, previously unreleased
No.	Title	Details	Length
1.	"Uyea Sound" (Instrumental Dim-D Mix)	from Lost Wishes Cassette, 1993	5:28
2.	"Cloudberry" (Instrumental Dim-D Mix)	from Lost Wishes Cassette, 1993	5:22
3.	"Off to Sleep..." (Instrumental Dim-D Mix)	from Lost Wishes Cassette, 1993	3:47
4.	"The Three Sisters" (Instrumental Dim-D Mix)	from Lost Wishes Cassette, 1993	4:12
5.	"A Wendy Band" (Instrumental)	previously unreleased	3:47
6.	"From the Edge of the Deep Green Sea" (Partscheckruf Mix)	previously unreleased version	7:36
7.	"Open" (Fix Mix)	B-side to "High" 12-inch	6:51
8.	"High" (Higher Mix)	"High" 12-inch	7:15
9.	"Doing the Unstuck" (Extended 12-inch Mix)	Join the Dots: B-Sides & Rarities box set	5:54
10.	"Friday I'm in Love" (Strangelove Mix)	"Friday I'm in Love" 12-inch	5:29
11.	"A Letter to Elise" (Blue Mix)	"A Letter to Elise" 12-inch	6:36
12.	"End" (Paris Live 92)	previously unreleased version	8:38

== Personnel ==
All credits taken from liner notes.

The Cure

- Robert Smith – vocals, guitars, six-string bass, keyboards
- Porl Thompson – guitars
- Perry Bamonte – guitars, six-string bass, keyboards
- Simon Gallup – bass, keyboards
- Boris Williams – drums, percussion

Additional musicians

- Kate Wilkinson – viola on "To Wish Impossible Things"

Production

- Producers: Dave Allen, the Cure
- Engineers: Dave Allen, Steve Whitfield
- Assistant engineer: Chris Bandy
- Mixing: Mark Saunders
- Mixing assistants: Andy Baker, William Parry, Danton Supple, Mark Warner
- Album cover: Parched Art (Porl Thompson and Andy Vella)

== Charts ==
=== Weekly charts ===
Weekly chart performance for Wish
Chart (1992)	Peak position
Australian Albums (ARIA)	1
Austrian Albums (Ö3 Austria)	14
Belgian Albums (IFPI)	2
Canada Top Albums/CDs (RPM)	12
Danish Albums (Hitlisten)	7
Dutch Albums (Album Top 100)	22
European Albums (Music & Media)	6
Finnish Albums (Suomen virallinen lista)	18
German Albums (Offizielle Top 100)	6
Hungarian Albums (MAHASZ)	28
Irish Albums (IFPI)	2
Italian Albums (Musica e dischi)	7
New Zealand Albums (RMNZ)	3
Norwegian Albums (VG-lista)	7
Portuguese Albums (AFP)	7
Spanish Albums (AFYVE)	17
Swedish Albums (Sverigetopplistan)	10
Swiss Albums (Schweizer Hitparade)	8
UK Albums (Official Charts)	1
US Billboard 200	2
US Top 200 Pop Albums (Cash Box)	1

Weekly chart performance for Wish (30th anniversary edition)
Chart (2022)	Peak position
Australian Albums (ARIA)	37
Belgian Albums (Ultratop Flanders)	9
Belgian Albums (Ultratop Wallonia)	5
Danish Albums (Hitlisten)	23
Dutch Albums (Album Top 100)	18
Finnish Albums (Suomen virallinen lista)	17
German Albums (Offizielle Top 100)	4
Hungarian Albums (MAHASZ)	7
Irish Albums (IRMA)	21
Italian Albums (FIMI)	30
Polish Albums (ZPAV)	23
Scottish Albums (Official Charts)	7
Spanish Albums (Promusicae)	21
Swedish Albums (Sverigetopplistan)	42
Swiss Albums (Schweizer Hitparade)	5
UK Albums (Official Charts)	9
US Billboard 200	45
US Top Alternative Albums (Billboard)	5
US Top Catalog Albums (Billboard)	22
US Top Rock Albums (Billboard)	8
US Indie Store Album Sales (Billboard)	1

=== Year-end charts ===
Year-end chart performance for Wish
Chart (1992)	Position
Canada Top Albums/CDs (RPM)	62
European Albums (Music & Media)	28
German Albums (Offizielle Top 100)	35
New Zealand Albums (RMNZ)	32
UK Albums (OCC)	82
US Billboard 200	55

== Certifications and sales ==
Certifications and sales for Wish
Region	Certification	Certified units/sales
Australia (ARIA)	Platinum	70,000^{^}
Canada (Music Canada)	Gold	50,000^{^}
New Zealand (RMNZ)	Gold	7,500^{^}
Switzerland (IFPI Switzerland)	Gold	25,000^{^}
United Kingdom (BPI)	Gold	100,000^{^}
United States (RIAA)	Platinum	1,000,000^{^}
Summaries
Worldwide	—	3,000,000
^{^} Shipments figures based on certification alone.
