= Perfect Life (Levinhurst album) =

Studio album by Levinhurst
- Released: March 23, 2004
- Genre: Electronica

Levinhurst chronology
Perfect Life (2004)	The Grey (2006)

Professional ratings
Review scores
Source	Rating
Allmusic	4/5 stars

Perfect Life is the debut studio album of Levinhurst, released in 2004.

Lol Tolhurst later said that working on the album allowed him to creatively return to his best:

“It was great to be finally working with my own agenda in place and a newfound confidence, born in part from finding out that my wife had a wonderful singing voice.”

== Reception ==
Jo-Ann Greene of Allmusic gave Perfect Life 4 out of 5 stars, calling it "a highly coherent selection of electro numbers that range from clubby dance songs to more ambient soundscapes, some instrumental, others given added atmospheres by Cindy Levinson's dreamy vocals."

== Track listing ==
1. "Vinti" (1:13)
2. "Let's Go" (3:39)
3. "Sorrow" (3:30)
4. "Sadman" (5:41)
5. "Lost" (4:13)
6. "Insomniac" (1:33)
7. "Despair" (3:47)
8. "Hope" (3:03)
9. "Behind Me" (4:09)
10. "Perfect Life" (1:30)
11. "More/Mad" (7:05)

== Personnel ==
- Cindy Levinson - vocals
- Lol Tolhurst - keyboards, drums, synthesizer
- Dayton Borders - guitar, keyboard
