= Pornography (album) =

1982 album by the Cure

Studio album by the Cure
- Released: 3 May 1982
- Recorded: January–April 1982
- Studios: RAK, London
- Genres: Gothic rock; post-punk; neo-psychedelia
- Length: 43:30
- Label: Fiction
- Producers: Phil Thornalley; The Cure

The Cure chronology
Faith (1981)	Pornography (1982)	Japanese Whispers (1983)

Singles from Pornography
- 1. "The Hanging Garden" Released: 12 July 1982

Pornography is the fourth studio album by the English rock band the Cure, released on 3 May 1982 by Fiction Records. Preceded by the non-album single "Charlotte Sometimes", it was the band's first album with new producer Phil Thornalley, and was recorded at RAK Studios from January to April 1982. The sessions saw the band on the brink of collapse, with heavy drug use, band in-fighting, and frontman Robert Smith's depression fueling the album's musical and lyrical content. Pornography represents the conclusion of the Cure's early dark, gloomy musical phase, which began with their second album Seventeen Seconds (1980).

Following its release, bassist Simon Gallup left the band, and the Cure switched to a much brighter and more radio-friendly new wave sound. Although it was poorly received by critics at the time of release, Pornography was the Cure's most popular album to date, reaching number eight on the UK Albums Chart. It has since gone on to gain acclaim from critics, and is now considered an important milestone in the development of the style of music known as gothic rock.

== Background and recording ==
Following the band's previous album, 1981's Faith, the non-album single "Charlotte Sometimes" was released. The single, in particular its B-side "Splintered in Her Head", would hint at what was to come on Pornography.

In the words of Robert Smith, regarding the album's conception, "I had two choices at the time, which were either completely giving in [committing suicide] or making a record of it and getting it out of me". He also claims he "really thought that was it for the group. I had every intention of signing off. I wanted to make the ultimate 'fuck off' record, and then sign off [the band]". Smith was mentally exhausted during that period of time: "I was in a really depressed frame of mind between 1981 and 1982". The band "had been touring for about 200 days a year and it all got a bit too much because there was never any time to do anything else".

The band, Smith in particular, wanted to make the album with a different producer than Mike Hedges, who had produced Seventeen Seconds and Faith. According to Lol Tolhurst, Smith and Tolhurst briefly met with the producer Conny Plank at Fiction's offices in the hopes of having him produce the album since they were both fans of his work with Kraftwerk, however, the group soon settled on Phil Thornalley. Pornography is the last Cure album to feature Tolhurst as the band's drummer (he then became the band's keyboardist), and also marked the first time he played keyboards on a Cure release. The album was recorded at RAK Studios from January to April 1982.

On the album's recording sessions, Smith noted "there was a lot of drugs involved". The band took LSD and drank a lot of alcohol, and to save money, they slept in the office of their record label. The musicians usually turned up at eight, and left at midday looking "fairly deranged". Smith related: "We had an arrangement with the off-licence up the road, every night they would bring in supplies. We decided we weren't going to throw anything out. We built this mountain of empties in the corner, a gigantic pile of debris in the corner. It just grew and grew". According to Tolhurst, "we wanted to make the ultimate, intense album. I can't remember exactly why, but we did". The recording sessions commenced and concluded in three weeks. Smith noted, "At the time, I lost every friend I had, everyone, without exception, because I was incredibly obnoxious, appalling, self-centred". He also noted that with the album, he "channelled all the self-destructive elements of my personality into doing something". He would later say in a 1987 Spin interview that, "lyrically, content-wise. Pornography is just a very odd record that was made by a very odd group. I don't think I would recognize myself around that time. I was undergoing a lot of mental stress. But it had nothing to do with the group, it just had to do with what I was like, my age and things. I think I got to my worst round about Pornography. Looking back and getting other people's opinions of what went on, I was a pretty monstrous sort of person at that time."

Polydor Records, the company in charge of Fiction, was initially displeased with the album's title, which it saw as being potentially offensive.

== Music and influences ==
Regarding the album's musical style, NME reviewer Dave Hill wrote, "The drums, guitars, voice and production style are pressed scrupulously together in a murderous unity of surging, textured mood". Hill further described it as "Phil Spector in Hell". Trouser Press said about the track "A Short Term Effect": it "stresses ephemeralness with Smith's echo-laden voice decelerating at the end of each phrase". Ira Robbins observed that "the song closest to basic pop" is "A Strange Day": It "has overdubbed backing vocals plus a delineated verse and chorus wrapped in some strangely consonant guitar figures". The journalist also commented: the song "Cold" "gets the full gothic treatment", with "grandiose minor-mode organ swells". Describing the title track, writer Dave McCullough said that it "tries to copy Cabaret Voltaire, all shuddering tape noise".

Smith said that "the reference point" for Pornography was the Psychedelic Furs' self-titled debut album, which he noted "had, like, a density of sound, really powerful". Smith also said: Siouxsie and the Banshees, "they were a massive influence on me... They were the group who led me towards doing Pornography. They drew something out of me". In 1982, Smith also said that the "records he'd take into the bunker after the big bang", were Desertshore by Nico, Music for Films by Brian Eno, Are You Experienced and Axis: Bold as Love by Jimi Hendrix, Twenty Golden Greats by Frank Sinatra and the Early Piano Works by Erik Satie.

== Release and reception ==
Contemporary professional ratings
Review scores
Source	Rating
Rolling Stone	1.5/5 stars
Sounds	3/5 stars
The Village Voice	C

Pornography was released on 3 May 1982. The album debuted and peaked at No. 8 on the UK Albums Chart, staying on the chart for nine weeks. Fiction owner Chris Parry found "The Hanging Garden" to be the album's only potential single, and after being "polished" by Thornalley and Smith, it was released as a single on 12 July, reaching No. 32 on the UK Singles Chart.

Despite the commercial performance of the album, Pornography was not well received by most music critics upon its release. NME reviewer Dave Hill was ambivalent towards the album, writing that while he found the lyrics "tiresomely self-analytical," the album "portrays and parades its currency of exposed futility and utterly naked fear with so few distractions or adornments, and so little sense of shame. It really piles it on. The Cure have applied themselves to catching a related collection of the very purest feelings endemic to their age, and holding them right on the spot in their intangible, unspecified, unmanageable and most unpleasantly real form." Adam Sweeting of Melody Maker wrote: "It's downhill all the way, into ever-darkening shadows... passing through chilly marbled archways to the final rendezvous with the cold comfort of the slab".

Dave McCullough of Sounds felt that despite a "genuine talent still at work", Pornography "has too much music too cluttered a backing for Smith's well-intended observance [...] Robert Smith seems locked in himself, a spiralling nightmare that leaves The Cure making a pompous sounding music that is, when all's said and done, dryly meaningless". Robert Christgau, writing in The Village Voice, derided Smith's "glum" lyrics: "Cheer up; look on the bright side. You got your contract, right? And your synthesizers, bet you'll have fun with them. Believe me, kid, it will pass."

Rolling Stone critic J. D. Considine commented that the lyrics seem "stuck in the terminal malaise of adolescent existentialism", concluding, "Pornography comes off as the aural equivalent of a bad toothache. It isn't the pain that irks, it's the persistent dullness". Trouser Press' Charles McCardell, on the other hand, found that the Cure "imposes an order that at first seems contrary to the basic preconceptions of rock 'n' roll" – noting that "for them, lyrics are everything" and that instruments had been relegated to "merely creating atmosphere" – and hailed Pornography as an "uncompromising and challenging" work.

== Legacy ==
Retrospective professional ratings
Review scores
Source	Rating
AllMusic	3.5/5 stars
Blender	5/5 stars
Entertainment Weekly	B
The Guardian	2/5 stars
Mojo	5/5 stars
Pitchfork	8.4/10
Q	4/5 stars
Rolling Stone	4/5 stars
The Rolling Stone Album Guide	3/5 stars
Uncut	5/5 stars

Retrospective views of Pornography have been far more favourable. In 1995, Mark Coleman of Rolling Stone noted that Pornography had come to be "revered by Cureheads as a masterstroke", while noting that "normal listeners will probably find it impenetrable". Stewart Mason of AllMusic found it to be "much better than most mainstream critics of the time thought", but at the same time "not the masterpiece some fans have claimed it to be" and "just a bit too uneven to be considered a classic". In 2004, Jaime Gill of BBC Music singled out the album's "sonic depth and sheer relentless conviction" for praise, adding that without these qualities, its "extraordinary misanthropy would be laughable". Uncut called Pornography "a masterpiece of claustrophobic self-loathing."

In 2000, Pornography was voted No. 183 in Colin Larkin's All Time Top 1000 Albums. In 2005, Spin cited the album as a "high-water mark for goth's musical evolution". NME described Pornography as "arguably the album that invented goth". Slant Magazine listed the album at No. 79 on its list of the best albums of the 1980s. In 2011, NME listed Pornography at No. 6 on its "50 Darkest Albums Ever" list. Mojo placed it at No. 83 on its list of "100 Records That Changed the World". In his review for AllMusic, Stewart Mason also described the record as "one of the key goth rock albums of the '80s".

According to Apter, Pornography would prove to be "enormously influential", and has been cited as an influence by bands such as Deftones and System of a Down.

In 2017, Damnation A.D. released a cover version of the entire album. Xiu Xiu and Chelsea Wolfe covered "One Hundred Years" on Xiu Xiu's 2021 album Oh No. Another cover version of the entire album was released by Leaether Strip in 2024.

== Live performances ==
In the period preceding and following the release of Pornography, the group started to develop their trademark image of big hair, smudged makeup and black clothes. Smith applied lipstick smeared around the eyes and the mouth. Under the lights, the lipstick melted, making it look, as Smith later put it "like we'd been smacked in the face". It was supposed to symbolise the violence of the new material but backstage, another kind of violence had begun to surface from the first dates of the tour.

The group performed in the UK in April 1982. NME considered that the show "was all very skillfully deployed: a bruisingly clear sound of scathing force, a clockwork, Pavlovian lightshow, a variegation of light and shade in the song order that builds to the unmitigating force of 'Pornography' itself as the climax". However, the mood on stage was not good: The journalist noted that Smith looked "dejected and tired" for his birthday. Behind the scenes, Smith's relationship with Gallup was deteriorating. When the tour reached Europe, tensions were so high between the two musicians that they had a fight after a concert in Strasbourg. Tolhurst found out the next day that his two partners "had both gone back to England". At home, Smith heard his father telling him: "Get right back out on that tour! People have bought tickets!" After two more weeks of touring, the group played their final show in Brussels. Tolhurst later related: "I remember sitting in the dressing room thinking, 'oh well, that's the end of the band, then' [...] I went off to France for a bit. I guess I ran away. Escaping from the reality of The Cure". Back in England, Smith took a rest with a month's camping holiday to the Lake District to "clean up".

== Track listing ==
All tracks are written by the Cure (Robert Smith, Simon Gallup and Lol Tolhurst).

Side one
No.	Title	Length
1.	"One Hundred Years"	6:40
2.	"A Short Term Effect"	4:22
3.	"The Hanging Garden"	4:33
4.	"Siamese Twins"	5:29

Side two
No.	Title	Length
1.	"The Figurehead"	6:15
2.	"A Strange Day"	5:04
3.	"Cold"	4:26
4.	"Pornography"	6:27

2005 Deluxe Edition bonus disc: Rarities 1981–1982
No.	Title	Length
1.	"Break" (Group Home Instrumental Demo 11/81)	2:11
2.	"Demise" (Studio Instrumental Demo 12/81)	2:09
3.	"Temptation" (Studio Instrumental Demo 12/81)	4:00
4.	"The Figurehead" (Studio Demo 12/81)	6:12
5.	"The Hanging Garden" (Studio Demo 12/81)	5:29
6.	"One Hundred Years" (Studio Demo 12/81)	7:00
7.	"Airlock: The Soundtrack" (3/82)	13:07
8.	"Cold" (Live at Hammersmith Odeon 5/82 - bootleg audience recording)	3:54
9.	"A Strange Day" (Live at Hammersmith Odeon 5/82 - bootleg audience recording)	4:05
10.	"Pornography" (Live at Hammersmith Odeon 5/82 - bootleg audience recording)	5:55
11.	"All Mine" (Live at Hammersmith Odeon 5/82)	2:54
12.	"A Short Term Effect" (Live in Brussels 6/82)	4:05
13.	"Siamese Twins" (Live in Brussels 6/82)	6:03
14.	"Temptation Two (AKA Let's Go to Bed)" (RS Studio Demo 7/82)	3:57

== Personnel ==
The Cure

- Robert Smith – vocals, guitar, keyboards, production, engineering
- Simon Gallup – bass guitar, keyboards, production
- Lol Tolhurst – drums, keyboards, production

Technical

- Phil Thornalley – production, engineering assistance
- Mike Nocito – engineering
- Michael Kostiff – sleeve photography
- Ben Kelly – sleeve design

== Charts ==
1982 chart performance for Pornography
Chart (1982)	Peak position
Australian Albums (Kent Music Report)	39
Dutch Albums (Album Top 100)	17
New Zealand Albums (RMNZ)	9
Swedish Albums (Sverigetopplistan)	47
UK Albums (Official Charts)	8

Chart performance for Pornography (2005 deluxe edition)
Chart (2005)	Peak position
Belgian Albums (Ultratop Wallonia)	70
French Albums (SNEP)	81
Italian Albums (FIMI)	89

2021 weekly chart performance for Pornography
Chart (2021)	Peak position
Greek Albums (IFPI)	3

Chart performance for Pornography (40th anniversary edition)
Chart (2022)	Peak position
Scottish Albums (Official Charts)	23
UK Albums Sales (OCC)	14
UK Physical Albums (OCC)	13
UK Vinyl Albums (OCC)	9
US Billboard 200	133
US Top Alternative Albums (Billboard)	17
US Top Catalog Albums (Billboard)	50
US Top Rock Albums (Billboard)	24
US Indie Store Album Sales (Billboard)	4

2023 chart performance for Pornography
Chart (2023)	Peak position
Belgian Albums (Ultratop Flanders)	89

== Certifications ==
Certifications for Pornography
Region	Certification	Certified units/sales
United Kingdom (BPI)	Silver	60,000^{‡}
^{‡} Sales+streaming figures based on certification alone.
