= Faith (The Cure album) =

Studio album by the Cure
- Released: 14 April 1981
- Recorded: September 1980 – March 1981
- Studios: Morgan, London
- Genres: Gothic rock; post-punk; dark wave
- Length: 36:54
- Label: Fiction
- Producers: The Cure; Mike Hedges

The Cure chronology
Seventeen Seconds (1980)	Faith (1981)	Pornography (1982)

Singles from Faith
- 1. "Primary" Released: 27 March 1981

Faith is the third studio album by the English rock band the Cure, released on 14 April 1981 by Fiction Records. It is the first album recorded after the departure of former keyboardist Matthieu Hartley.The album saw the band continuing in the gloomy vein of their previous effort Seventeen Seconds (1980). This stylistic theme would conclude with their next album Pornography (1982).

Preceded by the single "Primary", the album was well received by critics and was a commercial success in the UK, peaking at number fourteen on the UK Albums Chart and staying on the chart for eight weeks.

== Background ==
Following the tour for Seventeen Seconds, the Cure returned to Morgan Studios on 27 September 1980 to record a new album, minus Matthieu Hartley, who had departed due to disagreement with the musical direction of the band. During this session, recordings of songs "All Cats Are Grey" and "Primary" were attempted, but neither ended up on the album. Robert Smith was hoping the tracks would sound "funereal", but instead he said "they just sounded dull". Several other studios were tried: Red Bus, Trident, The Roundhouse and Abbey Road.

Much of Faith was written in the studio. Tolhurst says: "We had been on the road constantly, switching between recording an album and touring." At least two songs on the album, "All Cats Are Grey" and "The Drowning Man", were inspired by the Gormenghast novels of Mervyn Peake. Faith was the first album by the Cure to feature a six-string bass guitar; "All Cats Are Grey" (for which drummer Laurence Tolhurst has claimed a rare lyric-writing credit) features Smith on keyboards and piano, with no guitar at all.

The instrumental piece "Carnage Visors" (i.e., an antonym for "rose-coloured spectacles"; originally available only on the long-play cassette release) is the soundtrack to Carnage Visors, a short film by Ric Gallup, Simon Gallup's brother, that was screened at the beginning of shows in place of a support band on the 1981 Picture Tour, and featured animation of several dolls in different positions and stances. The film has since disappeared, and only Smith, Lol Tolhurst and Simon Gallup own copies of it, though during a televised interview in the mid-1980s, the host of the program surprised the band by playing a clip of the film on set.

The album's cover, designed by former and future member Porl Thompson, is a veiled picture of the church Bolton Priory, in the fog.

== Release and re-issues ==
Faith was released on 17 April 1981. It reached No. 14 in the UK Albums Chart. The album was remastered in 2005 as part of Universal Music's Deluxe Edition series. The new edition featured "Carnage Visors", demos and live tracks as well as the non-album single "Charlotte Sometimes". It also included a few never-before-released tracks (in demo form, all instrumentals). In 2021, a 40th anniversary vinyl picture disc was released for Record Store Day.

== Critical reception and legacy ==
Professional ratings
Review scores
Source	Rating
AllMusic	3.5/5 stars
Blender	3/5 stars
Entertainment Weekly	B+
The Guardian	3/5 stars
Mojo	4/5 stars
Pitchfork	8.8/10
The Rolling Stone Album Guide	3/5 stars
Smash Hits	7/10
Sounds	4.5/5 stars
Uncut	4/5 stars

Faith divided critics upon release. Sounds reviewer John Gill wrote that while the more uptempo songs "Primary" and "Doubt" were reminiscent of the Cure's previous work, with a "sense of strong, haunting melody", the remainder of the album marked a stark departure for the band; he noted a "Neu!-ish sense of smudged melody, soft tones flowing around a languorous, groaning bass", and found that the band's new sound evoked 1960s acts such as Pink Floyd and the Doors. Gill remarked that "listening to Faith requires a personal act of involvement, the reward being a sense of belonging."

Melody Maker deemed the record "impressive", praising its "richness and deceptive power". Writer Adam Sweeting described Faith as "a sophisticated exercise in atmosphere and production", adding, "It's gloomy but frequently majestic, never using brute force where auto-suggestion will do. You may not love it, but you'll become addicted to it." David Hepworth of Smash Hits said that "despite some rather stilted lyrics", the Cure "continue to develop one of the most individual and pleasing styles around." NME's review of the album, written by Ray Lowry, was accompanied by a picture of the band and a caption reading: "Gloomy? Gothic? Us?". Lowry wrote that the album "says absolutely nothing meaningful" and dismissed it as "just the modern face of Pink Floydism." Record Mirror's Mike Nicholls found that "The Cure remain stuck in the hackneyed doom-mongering that should have died with Joy Division" and panned Faith as "hollow, shallow, pretentious, meaningless, self-important and bereft of any real heart or soul".

In a retrospective review, Chris True of AllMusic called Faith "a depressing record, certainly, but also one of the most underrated and beautiful albums the Cure put together." In 2010, Fact ranked the album as one of the 20 best "goth records ever made".

== Track listing ==
All lyrics are written by Robert Smith; all music is composed by The Cure (Smith, Simon Gallup and Lol Tolhurst).

Side A
No.	Title	Length
1.	"The Holy Hour"	4:25
2.	"Primary"	3:35
3.	"Other Voices"	4:28
4.	"All Cats Are Grey"	5:28

Side B
No.	Title	Length
5.	"The Funeral Party"	4:14
6.	"Doubt"	3:11
7.	"The Drowning Man"	4:50
8.	"Faith"	6:43

Cassette/2005 CD Deluxe Edition bonus track
No.	Title	Length
9.	"Carnage Visors: The Soundtrack"	27:51

2005 CD Deluxe Edition bonus disc: Rarities 1980–1981
No.	Title	Length
1.	"Faith" (Robert Smith home instrumental demo 8/80)	2:56
2.	"Doubt" (Robert Smith home instrumental demo 8/80)	1:09
3.	"Drowning" (group home instrumental demo 9/80)	1:52
4.	"The Holy Hour" (group home demo 9/80)	4:48
5.	"Primary" (Morgan studio out-take 9/80)	4:22
6.	"Going Home Time" (Morgan studio guide vox out-take 9/80)	3:31
7.	"The Violin Song" ('Faith' studio guide vox out-take 2/81)	3:38
8.	"A Normal Story" ('Faith' studio guide vox out-take 2/81)	3:04
9.	"All Cats Are Grey" (live "somewhere", "Summer 1981")	5:37
10.	"The Funeral Party" (live "somewhere", "Summer 1981")	4:38
11.	"Other Voices" (live "somewhere", "Summer 1981")	4:45
12.	"The Drowning Man" (live "Australasia", "Summer 1981")	5:48
13.	"Faith" (live at Capitol Theatre, Sydney, August 1981)	10:23
14.	"Forever" (live "somewhere", "Summer" 1981)	9:19
15.	"Charlotte Sometimes"	4:13

== Personnel ==
The Cure

- Robert Smith – vocals, guitars, keyboards, Bass VI, production
- Simon Gallup – bass guitar, production
- Lol Tolhurst – drums, production

Production

- Mike Hedges – production, engineering
- David Kemp – engineering
- Graham Carmichael – engineering
- Porl Thompson – album cover design

== Charts ==
=== Weekly charts ===
1981 weekly chart performance for Faith
Chart (1981)	Peak position
Australian Albums (Kent Music Report)	38
Dutch Albums (Album Top 100)	9
New Zealand Albums (RMNZ)	1
Swedish Albums (Sverigetopplistan)	38
UK Albums (Official Charts)	14

Weekly chart performance for Faith (2005 deluxe edition)
Chart (2005)	Peak position
Belgian Albums (Ultratop Wallonia)	73
French Albums (SNEP)	84

2008 weekly chart performance for Faith
Chart (2008)	Peak position
Italian Albums (FIMI)	74

Weekly chart performance for Faith (40th anniversary edition)
Chart (2021)	Peak position
Scottish Albums (Official Charts)	18
UK Albums Sales (OCC)	18
UK Physical Albums (OCC)	16
UK Vinyl Albums (OCC)	8
US Billboard 200	196
US Top Alternative Albums (Billboard)	25
US Top Rock Albums (Billboard)	41
US Indie Store Album Sales (Billboard)	11

=== Year-end charts ===
Year-end chart performance for Faith
Chart (1981)	Position
New Zealand Albums (RMNZ)	17

== Certifications ==
Region	Certification	Certified units/sales
New Zealand (RMNZ)	Gold	7,500^{^}
United Kingdom (BPI)	Silver	60,000^{^}
^{^} Shipments figures based on certification alone.
