= Seventeen Seconds =

Studio album by the Cure
- Released: 18 April 1980
- Recorded: January 1980
- Studios: Morgan, London
- Genres: Post-punk; gothic rock; new wave; dark wave
- Length: 35:40
- Label: Fiction
- Producers: Mike Hedges; Robert Smith

The Cure chronology
Boys Don't Cry (1980)	Seventeen Seconds (1980)	Faith (1981)

Singles from Seventeen Seconds
- 1. "A Forest" Released: 28 March 1980

Seventeen Seconds is the second studio album by the English rock band the Cure, released on 18 April 1980 by Fiction Records. The album marked the first time frontman Robert Smith co-produced with Mike Hedges. After the departure of original bassist Michael Dempsey, Simon Gallup became an official member along with keyboardist Matthieu Hartley. The single "A Forest" was the band's first entry in the top 40 of the UK Singles Chart.

== History ==
At the end of the Cure's 1979 UK tour supporting Siouxsie and the Banshees, Robert Smith spoke less and less with bassist Michael Dempsey. Early versions of "Play for Today" and "M" had been performed at a few concerts, but Dempsey did not like the new musical direction that Smith wanted to take. Smith commented: "I think the final straw came when I played Michael the demos for the next album and he hated them. He wanted us to be XTC part 2 and – if anything – I wanted us to be the Banshees part 2. So he left". Smith would go on to say that "Seventeen Seconds was the most personal record that we’ve ever done, strangely enough".

Playing guitar with the Banshees for two months and learning their songs opened up another horizon to Smith. "It allowed me to think beyond what we were doing. I wanted to have a band that does what Steven Severin and Budgie do, where they just get a bassline and the drum part and Siouxsie wails". Smith was also particularly influenced by Nick Drake, Pink Floyd, and Captain Beefheart at the time. The records to which Smith was frequently listening during the composition of the album were Five Leaves Left by Nick Drake, Isle of Wight by Jimi Hendrix, Astral Weeks by Van Morrison and Low by David Bowie.

Smith wrote the lyrics and music for most of the record at his parents' home, on a Hammond organ with a built-in tape recorder. Interviewed in 2004, producer Mike Hedges did not recall any demo tracks, with the band generally playing the track in the studio before laying down a backing track to which overdubs were added.

Two members of the Magazine Spies, bass guitarist Simon Gallup and keyboardist Matthieu Hartley, were added to the band's lineup. Gallup replaced Dempsey, which relieved Smith as he felt Dempsey's basslines were too ornate. Hartley's synth work added a new dimension to the band's newly ethereal sound, although he would later clash with Smith over complexity; Hartley enjoyed complex chords but Smith wanted single notes.

Money was short, so the album was recorded and mixed in seven days between 13 and 20 January on a budget of between £2,000 and £3,000, which resulted in the band working 16 or 17 hours a day. Smith stated that as a result, the track "The Final Sound", which was planned to be much longer, was cut down to 53 seconds because the tape ran out while recording and the band could not record it again. The album, mostly a collection of downbeat tracks, features ambient echoing vocals with the sonic direction driven by its drum sound.

== Musical style ==
Retrospectively, Seventeen Seconds has been considered an early example of gothic rock. Its "gloomscapes" are considered to be "a sonic touchstone" for the forthcoming movement. The track "The Final Sound" is "so positively gothic you could almost be fooled into believing that it was lifted from the soundtrack of some Hammer horror gorefest". The album has also been described as new wave and dark wave.

== Release and reissue ==
Seventeen Seconds was released on 18 April 1980. It reached No. 20 on the British album charts. It was also released in Australia on 7 Records. The record was repackaged in the US in 1981 (on the A&M label) with Faith as Happily Ever After, available as a double LP. In 2005, the album was remastered as part of Universal's Deluxe Edition series, featuring bonus live tracks and demos as well as studio material by Cult Hero, a 1970s-style progressive rock band along the lines of Easy Cure that featured Smith's postman Frank Bell as lead singer. Seventeen Seconds charted in the United States for the first time in September 2020, when it debuted at No. 186 on the Billboard 200 album chart.

== Reception and legacy ==
Professional ratings
Review scores
Source	Rating
AllMusic	3/5 stars
Blender	3/5 stars
Entertainment Weekly	B
The Guardian	4/5 stars
Mojo	3/5 stars
Pitchfork	7.5/10
The Rolling Stone Album Guide	3.5/5 stars
Smash Hits	8/10
Sounds	4.5/5 stars
Uncut	4/5 stars

The album's songs have been described by critics as featuring vague, often unsettling lyrics and dark, spare, minimalistic melodies. Some reviewers, such as Nick Kent of NME, felt that Seventeen Seconds represented a far more mature Cure, who had come very far musically in less than one year. Ian Cranna of Smash Hits wrote that the band were creating more ambitious music, while still retaining their "powerful melodic intensity". Chris Westwood of Record Mirror was less enthusiastic, viewing the album as "a sidewards step" rather than a progression; he found the material "biteless, a bit distant", showcasing a "reclusive, disturbed Cure, sitting in cold, dark, empty rooms, watching clocks".

Simon Reynolds said the album was "translucent-sounding", with shades of the Durutti Column, Young Marble Giants and Another Green World by Brian Eno. AllMusic writer Chris True said that while Seventeen Seconds had come to be largely overlooked in later years apart from its single "A Forest", it nonetheless represented an important development for the Cure, capturing them becoming "more rigid in sound, and more disciplined in attitude", and anticipating the bleak lyrical themes that would become more apparent on subsequent Cure albums.

Seventeen Seconds was included in the book 1001 Albums You Must Hear Before You Die. The authors note: "Like the album's cover art, which is little more than an abstract blur, the bleak, minimalist sound of Seventeen Seconds-era Cure is subtly suggestive." Attention is drawn to the "beguiling bleakness, both in its brief instrumentals and the more pop-oriented tracks (such as the sharp, hook-laden 'Play for Today') that hark back to their earlier work." In 2020, Rolling Stone included Seventeen Seconds in their "80 Greatest albums of 1980" list.

== Track listing ==
All lyrics are written by Robert Smith; all music is composed by the Cure (Smith, Matthieu Hartley, Simon Gallup and Lol Tolhurst).

Side A
No.	Title	Length
1.	"A Reflection"	2:12
2.	"Play for Today"	3:40
3.	"Secrets"	3:20
4.	"In Your House"	4:07
5.	"Three"	2:36

Side B
No.	Title	Length
6.	"The Final Sound"	0:52
7.	"A Forest"	5:55
8.	"M"	3:04
9.	"At Night"	5:54
10.	"Seventeen Seconds"	4:00

2005 CD Deluxe Edition bonus disc
No.	Title	Length
1.	"I'm a Cult Hero" (vinyl single by Cult Hero, December 1979)	2:59
2.	"I Dig You" (vinyl single by Cult Hero, December 1979)	3:40
3.	"Another Journey by Train (AKA 44F)" (group home instrumental demo, January 1980)	3:12
4.	"Secrets" (group home instrumental demo, January 1980)	3:40
5.	"Seventeen Seconds" (live in Amsterdam, January 1980)	3:59
6.	"In Your House" (live in Amsterdam, January 1980)	3:32
7.	"Three" (alternate studio mix, February 1980)	2:45
8.	"I Dig You" (Cult Hero live at the Marquee Club, London, March 1980)	3:36
9.	"I'm a Cult Hero" (Cult Hero live at the Marquee Club, London, March 1980)	3:21
10.	"M" (live in Arnhem, May 1980)	2:56
11.	"The Final Sound" (live in France, June 1980)	0:26
12.	"A Reflection" (live in France, June 1980)	1:39
13.	"Play for Today" (live in France, June 1980)	3:46
14.	"At Night" (live in France, June 1980)	5:37
15.	"A Forest" (live in France, June 1980)	6:28

== Personnel ==
Personnel taken from Seventeen Seconds liner notes.

The Cure

- Robert Smith – guitars, vocals
- Simon Gallup – bass
- Matthieu Hartley – keyboards
- Lol Tolhurst – drums

Production

- Robert Smith – production
- Mike Hedges – production, engineering
- Chris Parry – production assistance
- Matthieu Hartley – production assistance
- Lol Tolhurst – production assistance
- Simon Gallup – production assistance
- Mike Dutton – engineering
- Nigel Green – engineering assistance
- Andrew Warwick – engineering assistance
- Andrew Douglas – photography
- Bill Smith and the Cure – cover art

== Charts ==
=== Weekly charts ===
1980–1981 weekly chart performance for Seventeen Seconds
Chart (1980–1981)	Peak position
Australian Albums (Kent Music Report)	39
Dutch Albums (Album Top 100)	15
New Zealand Albums (RMNZ)	9
UK Albums (Official Charts)	20

2005 weekly chart performance for Seventeen Seconds
Chart (2005)	Peak position
Belgian Albums (Ultratop Wallonia)	78
French Albums (SNEP)	80

2020–2026 weekly chart performance for Seventeen Seconds
Chart (2020–2026)	Peak position
Belgian Albums (Ultratop Flanders)	144
Greek Albums (IFPI)	9
Scottish Albums (Official Charts)	28
UK Albums (Official Charts)	78
US Billboard 200	186
US Top Alternative Albums (Billboard)	21
US Top Rock Albums (Billboard)	36

=== Year-end charts ===
1980 year-end chart performance for Seventeen Seconds
Chart (1980)	Position
New Zealand Albums (RMNZ)	35

1981 year-end chart performance for Seventeen Seconds
Chart (1981)	Position
New Zealand Albums (RMNZ)	22

== Certifications and sales ==
Region	Certification	Certified units/sales
France (SNEP)	Gold	100,000^{*}
New Zealand (RMNZ)	Platinum	15,000^{^}
United Kingdom (BPI) Sales since 2005	Silver	60,000^{‡}
^{*} Sales figures based on certification alone.^{^} Shipments figures based on certification alone.^{‡} Sales+streaming figures based on certification alone.
