= Lol Tolhurst =

British drummer and keyboardist

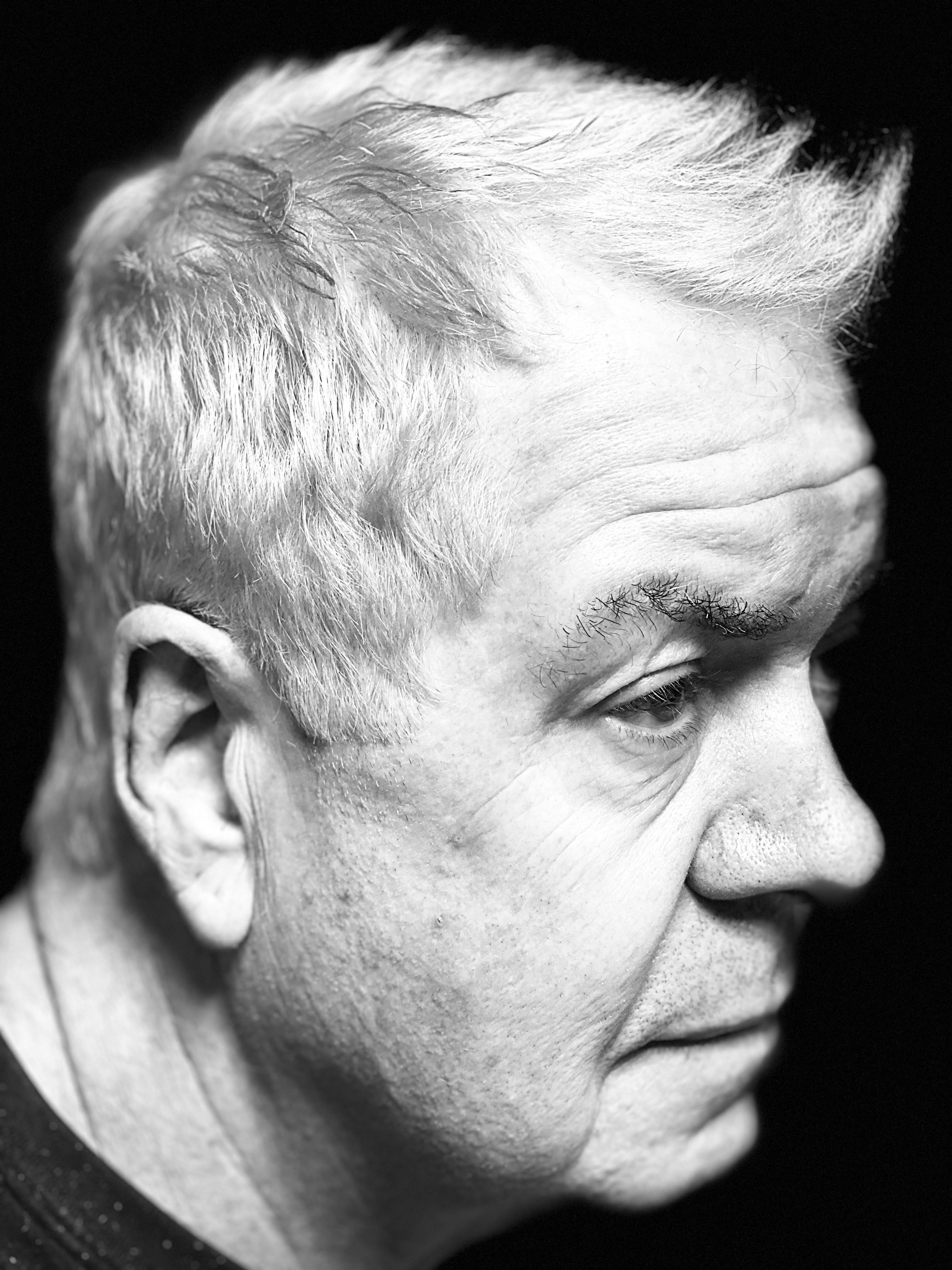
- Tolhurst in 2020

Background information
- Born: Laurence Andrew Tolhurst; 3 February 1959 (age 67)
- Origin: Horley, Surrey, England
- Genres: Post-punk; gothic rock; alternative rock; new wave; electronic
- Occupation: Musician
- Instruments: Drums; keyboards
- Years active: 1976–present
- Member of: Levinhurst
- Formerly of: The Cure; Presence
- Website: loltolhurst.com

Laurence "Lol" Andrew Tolhurst (born 3 February 1959) is an English musician, songwriter, producer, and author. He was a founder member of the Cure, for which he first played drums before switching to keyboards. He left the Cure in 1989, and later formed the bands Presence and Levinhurst. He has also published two books and developed the Curious Creatures podcast. His most recent studio release is the album Los Angeles (2023), in collaboration with Budgie and Jacknife Lee.

== Career ==
=== Early years ===
Lol is an English abbreviation of Laurence. Tolhurst was born in Horley, Surrey and is the fifth of six children to William and Daphne Tolhurst. He states in his memoir Cured that his father was an alcoholic with unpredictable moods. The Tolhurst family later moved to nearby Crawley, where he first met future bandmate Robert Smith when they were both five years old. Tolhurst's grandmother lived next door to Smith's family, and Tolhurst and Smith attended St. Francis Primary and Junior Schools together. During their teen years, the two played together in several early bands, with Tolhurst on drums. These bands eventually evolved into the Cure in 1978.

Tolhurst and future bandmate Pearl Thompson were present at the outbreak of the 1976 Notting Hill Carnival Riot and ran away as the riot began.

=== The Cure ===
Tolhurst played drums and occasionally keyboards for the Cure on their first four albums. After the tour for the Pornography album in 1982, Tolhurst decided to abandon the drums and switch to keyboards and synthesisers full time. During this period he also produced two singles and one album for the band And Also the Trees.

By 1985, Tolhurst's contributions to the Cure were diminishing due to his alcoholism, and during live performances some of his keyboard parts had to be supplemented by guitarist Pearl Thompson. Shortly after the release of Kiss Me Kiss Me Kiss Me in 1987, Tolhurst's apparent lack of preparation for the album's upcoming tour caused the band to recruit a second keyboardist, Roger O'Donnell.

During the recording of the following album Disintegration in 1989, Tolhurst's alcoholism became so severe that the other members of the band threatened to quit, and Tolhurst contributed very little to the album even though he was credited as a co-writer on all songs. While it was later revealed that Tolhurst contributed to the song "Homesick", his contributions to the rest of the album were nearly nonexistent, and he was ultimately credited with "other instruments" in the album's liner notes. Tolhurst was fired by Robert Smith shortly before the album's release.

=== After the Cure ===
Following his departure from the Cure, in 1989 Tolhurst formed the band Presence with singer Gary Biddles, who had been an early member of the Cure's road crew and was previously a member of Fools Dance. Presence released the album Inside in 1993; a second album titled Closer was recorded during this period but was not released until 2014. Meanwhile, Tolhurst had moved to Los Angeles in the United States and overcame his alcoholism. His son was born in 1991.

In 1994, Tolhurst sued Robert Smith and Fiction Records for unpaid royalties, claiming that he had been coerced into signing an unfavourable contract in the mid-1980s while debilitated by his alcohol problem. That contract had removed him as an equal partner in the Cure with Smith and relegated him to a paid employee. Tolhurst also claimed part ownership with Smith in the Cure's name. Tolhurst lost this lawsuit and was ordered by the court to pay Smith's legal expenses. Smith refunded the money to Tolhurst years later after they reconciled their friendship.

In 2002, Tolhurst and his wife Cindy Levinson formed the electronica band Levinhurst. This band released the albums Perfect Life in 2004 and House by the Sea in 2007. For their third album Blue Star in 2009 they were joined by another former member of the Cure, bassist Michael Dempsey. Tolhurst also composed music for the film 9000 Needles, which won the Best Documentary award at several prestigious film festivals.

In 2011, Tolhurst contacted Robert Smith to suggest a collaboration to honour the 30th anniversary of the Cure album Faith. Tolhurst had also discussed the possibility with another former bandmate, Roger O'Donnell. The Cure decided to organize a short tour commemorating three of their early albums. Tolhurst temporarily appeared with the band for several shows, first at the Sydney Opera House in Australia, playing keyboards and percussion. However, he did not officially rejoin the band.

=== Recent activities: writing and Los Angeles ===
In 2016, Tolhurst published his memoir Cured: The Tale of Two Imaginary Boys, largely recounting his childhood friendship with Robert Smith and the early years of the Cure. Tolhurst undertook an extensive book tour of the United Kingdom and United States. In 2018, he was featured in an episode of the BBC Radio 4 series Soul Music, in which he discussed the history of the Cure song "Boys Don't Cry". In 2019, he was inducted into the Rock and Roll Hall of Fame as a member of the Cure.

In 2021, Tolhurst developed the podcast Curious Creatures with Budgie, a member of longtime Cure associates Siouxsie and the Banshees, in which they explore "post punk's enduring legacy and contemporary relevance" along with invited guests. Tolhurst's second book Goth: A History was published in 2023. The Guardian wrote that the book "traces the genre from its 18th-century literary roots to its flourishing as a music subculture".

During this period, Tolhurst took up drumming again and teamed up with Budgie and Jacknife Lee on the album Los Angeles, released in November 2023. The album features guest appearances by James Murphy, the Edge, Bobby Gillespie, and Isaac Brock. Mojo praised the album as "thrilling", saying that "Los Angeles lands with a visceral impact, rich texturing and smart distortions adding a destabilising wobble". The album was issued on vinyl, CD, and digital. Tolhurst and Budgie toured in the US in spring 2024.

== Discography ==
With the Cure

- Three Imaginary Boys (1979)
- Boys Don't Cry (1980)
- Seventeen Seconds (1980)
- Faith (1981)
- Pornography (1982)
- Japanese Whispers (1983)
- The Top (1984)
- Concert: The Cure Live (1984)
- The Head on the Door (1985)
- Standing on a Beach (1986)
- Kiss Me, Kiss Me, Kiss Me (1987)
- Disintegration (1989)

With Presence

- Inside (1992)
- Closer (2014)

With Levinhurst

- Perfect Life (2004)
- The Grey (EP, 2006)
- House by the Sea (2007)
- Blue Star (2009)
- Somewhere, Nothing Is Everything (EP, 2014)

With Budgie and Jacknife Lee

- Los Angeles (2023)
