= Simon Gallup =

British bassist

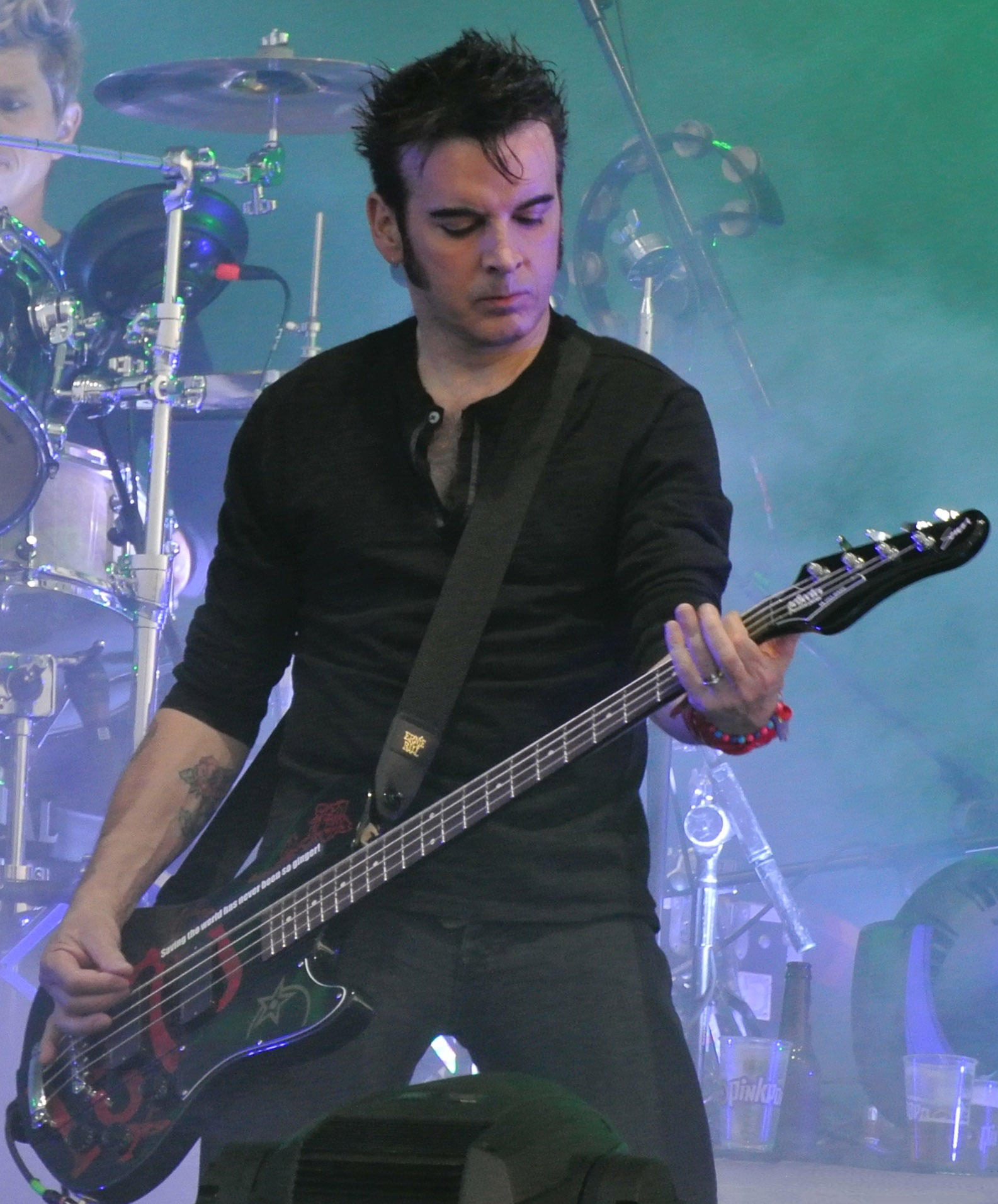
- Gallup performing in 2012

Background information
- Born: Simon Johnathon Gallup; 1 June 1960 (age 65); Duxhurst, Surrey, England
- Genres: Post-punk, gothic rock, new wave, alternative rock
- Occupation: Musician
- Instruments: Bass; keyboard
- Years active: 1975–present
- Member of: The Cure

Simon Johnathon Gallup (born 1 June 1960) is an English musician who is best known as bassist for The Cure, which he first joined in 1979 and for which he has played through most of the band's history. Gallup is the second-longest-serving member of the band, after vocalist and leader Robert Smith.

== Career ==
=== Early years ===
Gallup was born in Duxhurst, Surrey, and his family soon moved to Horley. Starting in 1976, he frequented the music scene in nearby Crawley, where his older brother Ric worked in a record shop and knew many local musicians. In 1977, Gallup formed the punk band Lockjaw, which later evolved into the post-punk band the Magazine Spies (also known as Mag/Spys). Those bands frequently played and socialized with early versions of The Cure.

In late 1979, Gallup participated in the short-lived Cure side project Cult Hero. A short time later, original Cure bassist Michael Dempsey left the band, and Gallup was recruited as his replacement. Gallup played on the albums Seventeen Seconds, Faith, and Pornography; and on the second of those he began to play keyboards occasionally in addition to his full-time bass duties.

=== Departure from the Cure ===
During the tour supporting the Pornography album in 1982, band relations within The Cure became contentious. After a performance in Strasbourg, France, on 27 May 1982, Gallup and Robert Smith got into a fistfight reportedly over a disputed bar tab. The tour continued, and at another performance in Brussels, Belgium, on 11 June, the band invited roadie Gary Biddles (a friend of Gallup's) on stage to sing one song, during which Biddles criticized the other members Smith and Lol Tolhurst. This further exacerbated tensions among the members of the band.

Gallup soon left the Cure and did not speak to Robert Smith again for about eighteen months. Gallup formed a new band called The Cry, which evolved into Fools Dance (with Biddles on vocals) by 1983. That band recorded an early EP featuring Gallup that was not released until 1985. He sang on the tracks "The Ring" and "Happy Families Waiting (At the Skylab Landing Bay)", the only released recordings in which he ever performed lead vocals.

=== Return to the Cure ===
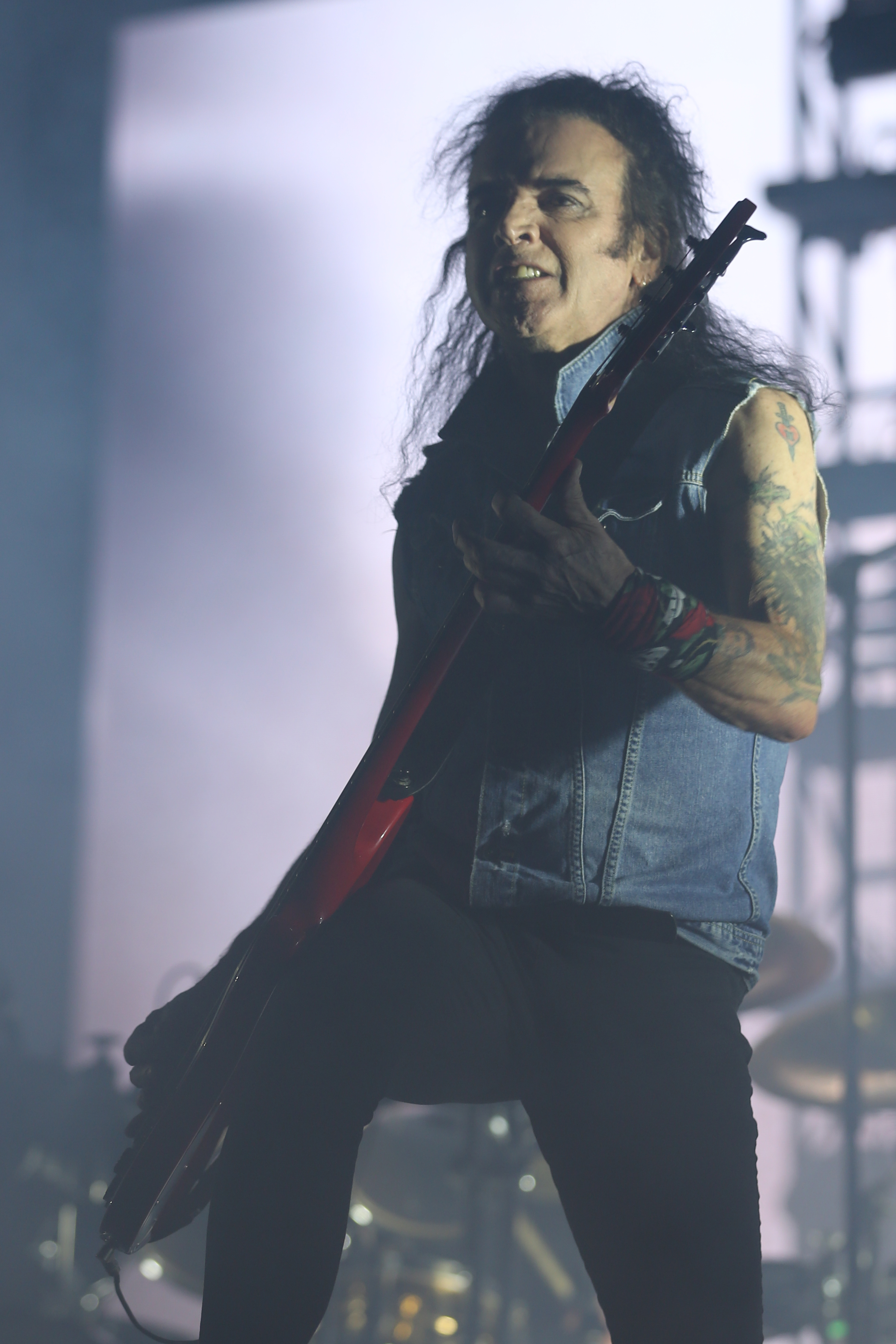
Gallup with The Cure in 2019

In late 1984, Biddles brokered a reconciliation between Gallup and Smith. The Cure was in need of a bassist after the departure of Phil Thornalley, and Smith invited Gallup to rejoin the band. Biddles later reformed Fools Dance with a new lineup, while Gallup has remained with the Cure ever since.

In 1992, Gallup was stricken with pleurisy and had to take a medical leave of absence from the Cure for several months. This caused him to miss several dates of the tour for the Wish album, at which time bassist Roberto Soave filled in temporarily. Gallup's son Eden became a member of the Cure's road crew and has occasionally filled in during gigs when his father was unable to appear for personal reasons. In 2019, Gallup was inducted into the Rock and Roll Hall of Fame as a member of the Cure.

In an unexplained incident in August 2021, Gallup announced on Facebook that he had left the Cure after 37 years, stating that he "just got fed up of betrayal." The Cure made no official statement about Gallup's departure, and he later deleted the Facebook post. In October 2021, Gallup issued another Facebook post to clarify that he is still a member of the band.

== Personal life ==
Gallup's older brother David Gallup was the manager for his early band Lockjaw. His other brother Ric Gallup has created promotional artwork for Lockjaw, the Magazine Spies, and the Cure; and created the short independent film Carnage Visors which the Cure showed at concerts in 1981.

Simon Gallup's first marriage was to Carol Joy Thompson in 1987; they had two children together before they divorced in 1992. In 1988, Gallup was best man at Robert Smith's wedding. Gallup married his second wife Sarah in 1997, and they have two children together. Sarah died in 2019 of pancreatic cancer.

== Gear ==
- Gallup's favourite bass is his Gibson Thunderbird. In 2004 Gibson created a special red Thunderbird bass for Gallup, to celebrate his 25th year as the bassist for the Cure.
- He has also played Fender Precision, Fender Jazz, Rickenbacker 4001, Music Man StingRay, Washburn AB10 acoustic, Kramer acoustic, custom Dick Knight, Epiphone Jack Casady, and Eccleshall 335 basses live.
- In 2011 Gallup started using a Schecter signature model based on their Ultra Spitfire bass.
- Gallup uses the following Boss guitar effect pedals: BF-2 Flanger, CE-5 Chorus Ensemble, MT-2 Distortion, DD-3 Digital Delay, and NS-2 Noise Suppressor.

== Discography ==
=== Lockjaw ===
- Radio Call Sign, The Young Ones (1977), – 7" single
- Journalist Jive, A Doong A Doong A, I'm A Virgin (1978), – 7" single

=== The Magazine Spies ===
- Life Blood, Bombs (1980), – Split 7" single with The Obtainers

=== The Cure ===
- Gallup has played on all albums by the Cure except Three Imaginary Boys (1979), Boys Don't Cry (1980), Japanese Whispers (compilation, 1983), The Top (1984), and Concert: The Cure Live (1984).

=== Fools Dance ===
- Fools Dance (1985) – EP
