= Join the Dots: B-Sides & Rarities 1978–2001 (The Fiction Years) =

Box set by The Cure
- Released: 27 January 2004
- Recorded: 1978–2001
- Length: 4:54:58
- Labels: Fiction (UK); Elektra/Rhino (US)
- Producers: The Cure, Robert Smith, Phil Thornalley, Chris Parry, Steve Nye, Mike Hedges, Dave Allen, Steve Lyon (Mixing), Paul Corkett

The Cure chronology
Greatest Hits (2001)	Join the Dots: B-Sides & Rarities 1978–2001 (The Fiction Years) (2004)	The Cure (2004)

Professional ratings
Aggregate scores
Source	Rating
Metacritic	69/100
Review scores
Source	Rating
AllMusic	4.5/5 stars
Blender	3/5 stars
Entertainment Weekly	B+
The Guardian	3/5 stars
NME	6/10
Pitchfork	6.8/10
Rolling Stone	3/5 stars
Stylus Magazine	A−
Uncut	3/5 stars
Yahoo! Music UK	7/10 stars

Join the Dots: B-Sides & Rarities 1978–2001 (The Fiction Years) is a box set of The Cure, released on 26 January 2004, by their former record label Fiction. (Elektra and Rhino co-released the compilation in North America.) This box set is a four-disc compilation of B-sides and rarities, digitally remastered by Chris Blair at Abbey Road Studios from their original tapes. The box set includes all B-sides by the band, apart from a number of remixes, as well a number of unreleased songs and songs that had been out of physical circulation for years. Many of the songs had not appeared on CD before. The set includes a booklet with track-by-track commentary and an extensive overview of the band's history up to 2004, followed by an extensive list of The Cure's discography.

The B-side "I'm Cold" features singer Siouxsie Sioux on backing vocals; the collaboration came at the time when The Cure were supporting Siouxsie and the Banshees on their 1979 British tour.

Some of the B-sides released between 1982 and 1983 were first compiled on the Japanese Whispers compilation album issued in late 1983.

The boxset includes an early version of "Lament", initially recorded with Siouxsie and the Banshees's co-founder Steven Severin as co-producer, to be released as a free single for Flexipop magazine in August 1982.

== Track listing ==
=== Disc 1 (1978–1985) ===
No.	Title	Writer(s)	Original release	Length
1.	"10:15 Saturday Night"	Michael Dempsey • Robert Smith • Lol Tolhurst	"Killing an Arab" (1978)	3:43
2.	"Plastic Passion"	Dempsey • Smith • Tolhurst	"Boys Don't Cry" (1979)	2:16
3.	"Pillbox Tales"	Dempsey • Smith • Tolhurst	"Boys Don't Cry" re-release (1986) (Originally recorded in 1979)	2:56
4.	"Do the Hansa"	Dempsey • Smith • Tolhurst	"Boys Don't Cry" re-release (1986) (Originally recorded in 1979)	2:40
5.	"I'm Cold"	Dempsey • Smith • Tolhurst	"Jumping Someone Else's Train" (1979)	2:49
6.	"Another Journey by Train"	Simon Gallup • Matthieu Hartley • Smith • Tolhurst	"A Forest" (1980)	3:06
7.	"Descent"	Gallup • Smith • Tolhurst	"Primary" (1981)	3:09
8.	"Splintered in Her Head"	Gallup • Smith • Tolhurst	"Charlotte Sometimes" (1981)	5:17
9.	"Lament"	Smith	Flexipop bonus 7" (1982)	4:36
10.	"Just One Kiss"	Smith • Tolhurst	"Let's Go to Bed" (1982)	4:10
11.	"The Dream"	Smith	"The Walk" (1983)	3:12
12.	"The Upstairs Room"	Smith • Tolhurst	"The Walk" (1983)	3:31
13.	"Lament"	Smith	"The Walk" (1983)	4:25
14.	"Speak My Language"	Smith • Tolhurst	"The Love Cats" (1983)	2:43
15.	"Mr. Pink Eyes"	Smith • Tolhurst	"The Love Cats" (1983)	2:45
16.	"Happy the Man"	Smith	"The Caterpillar" (1984)	2:47
17.	"Throw Your Foot"	Smith	"The Caterpillar" (1984)	3:33
18.	"New Day"	Smith • Tolhurst	"Close to Me" (1985)	4:10
19.	"The Exploding Boy"	Smith	"In Between Days" (1985)	2:54
20.	"A Few Hours After This..."	Smith	"In Between Days" (1985)	2:28
21.	"A Man Inside My Mouth"	Smith	"Close to Me" (1985)	3:07
22.	"Stop Dead"	Smith	"Close to Me" (1985)	4:02

=== Disc 2 (1987–1990) ===
No.	Title	Writer(s)	Original release	Length
1.	"A Japanese Dream"	Gallup • Smith • Porl Thompson • Tolhurst • Boris Williams	"Why Can't I Be You?" (1987)	3:29
2.	"Breathe"	Gallup • Smith • Thompson • Tolhurst • Williams	"Catch" (1987)	4:48
3.	"A Chain of Flowers"	Gallup • Smith • Thompson • Tolhurst • Williams	"Catch"	4:55
4.	"Snow in Summer"	Gallup • Smith • Thompson • Tolhurst • Williams	"Just Like Heaven" (1987)	3:27
5.	"Sugar Girl"	Gallup • Smith • Thompson • Tolhurst • Williams	Kiss Me, Kiss Me, Kiss Me bonus 7" (1987)	3:23
6.	"Icing Sugar (Remix)"	Gallup • Smith • Thompson • Tolhurst • Williams	Kiss Me, Kiss Me, Kiss Me bonus 7" (1987)	3:23
7.	"Hey You! (12" Extended Mix)"	Gallup • Smith • Thompson • Tolhurst • Williams	"Hot Hot Hot!!!" (1987)	4:08
8.	"How Beautiful You Are... (Bob Clearmountain Remix)"	Gallup • Smith • Thompson • Tolhurst • Williams	Kiss Me, Kiss Me, Kiss Me radio sampler (1987)	4:25
9.	"To the Sky"	Gallup • Smith • Thompson • Tolhurst • Williams	Stranger Than Fiction label sampler (1989)	5:15
10.	"Babble"	Gallup • Roger O'Donnell • Smith • Thompson • Tolhurst • Williams	"Lullaby" (1989)	4:18
11.	"Out of Mind"	Gallup • O'Donnell • Smith • Thompson • Tolhurst • Williams	"Lullaby" (1989)	3:51
12.	"2 Late"	Gallup • O'Donnell • Smith • Thompson • Tolhurst • Williams	"Lovesong" (1989)	2:41
13.	"Fear of Ghosts"	Gallup • O'Donnell • Smith • Thompson • Tolhurst • Williams	"Lovesong" (1989)	6:51
14.	"Hello, I Love You (Psychedelic Version)"	Densmore • Krieger • Manzarek • Morrison	Previously unreleased	6:04
15.	"Hello, I Love You"	Densmore • Krieger • Manzarek • Morrison	Rubáiyát: Elektra's 40th Anniversary	3:31
16.	"Hello, I Love You (Slight Return Mix)"	Densmore • Krieger • Manzarek • Morrison	Rubáiyát: Elektra's 40th Anniversary	0:13
17.	"Harold and Joe"	Gallup • Smith • Thompson • Williams	"Never Enough" (1990)	5:09
18.	"Just Like Heaven (Dizzy Mix)"	Gallup • Smith • Thompson • Tolhurst • Williams	"Close to Me" re-release (1990)	3:43

=== Disc 3 (1992–1996) ===
No.	Title	Writer(s)	Original release	Length
1.	"This Twilight Garden"	Perry Bamonte • Gallup • Smith • Thompson • Williams	"High" (1992)	4:45
2.	"Play"	Bamonte • Gallup • Smith • Thompson • Williams	"High" (1992)	4:36
3.	"Halo"	Bamonte • Gallup • Smith • Thompson • Williams	"Friday I'm in Love" (1992)	3:47
4.	"Scared as You"	Bamonte • Gallup • Smith • Thompson • Williams	"Friday I'm in Love" (1992)	4:12
5.	"The Big Hand"	Bamonte • Gallup • Smith • Thompson • Williams	"A Letter to Elise" (1992)	4:53
6.	"A Foolish Arrangement"	Bamonte • Gallup • Smith • Thompson • Williams	"A Letter to Elise" (1992)	3:51
7.	"Doing the Unstuck (Saunders 12" Remix)"	Bamonte • Gallup • Smith • Thompson • Williams	Previously unreleased	5:55
8.	"Purple Haze (Virgin Radio Version)"	Jimi Hendrix	Previously unreleased	3:18
9.	"Purple Haze"	Jimi Hendrix	Stone Free: A Tribute to Jimi Hendrix (1993)	5:22
10.	"Burn"	Bamonte • Gallup • Smith • Williams	The Crow: Original Motion Picture Soundtrack (1994)	6:37
11.	"Young Americans"	David Bowie	104.9 XFM compilation (1995)	6:23
12.	"Dredd Song"	Bamonte • Jason Cooper • Gallup • O'Donnell • Smith	Judge Dredd soundtrack	4:25
13.	"It Used to Be Me"	Bamonte • Cooper • Gallup • O'Donnell • Smith	"The 13th" (1996)	6:50
14.	"Ocean"	Bamonte • Cooper • Gallup • O'Donnell • Smith	"The 13th" (1996)	3:29
15.	"Adonais"	Bamonte • Cooper • Gallup • O'Donnell • Smith	"The 13th" (1996)	4:11

=== Disc 4 (1996–2001) ===
No.	Title	Writer(s)	Original release	Length
1.	"Home"	Bamonte • Cooper • Gallup • O'Donnell • Smith	"Mint Car" (1996)	3:24
2.	"Waiting"	Bamonte • Cooper • Gallup • O'Donnell • Smith	"Mint Car" (1996)	3:34
3.	"A Pink Dream"	Bamonte • Cooper • Gallup • O'Donnell • Smith	"Mint Car" (1996)	3:44
4.	"This Is a Lie (Ambient Mix)"	Bamonte • Cooper • Gallup • O'Donnell • Smith	"Gone!" (1996)	4:32
5.	"Wrong Number (P2P Remix)"	Smith	"Wrong Number" (1997)	8:14
6.	"More Than This"	Smith	The X-Files: The Album (1998)	5:11
7.	"World in My Eyes"	Martin Gore	For the Masses	4:52
8.	"Possession"	Bamonte • Cooper • Gallup • O'Donnell • Smith	Previously unreleased	5:17
9.	"Out of This World (Oakenfold Remix)"	Bamonte • Cooper • Gallup • O'Donnell • Smith	Previously unreleased	7:01
10.	"Maybe Someday (Hedges Remix)"	Bamonte • Cooper • Gallup • O'Donnell • Smith	"Maybe Someday" promo single (2000)	4:59
11.	"Coming Up"	Bamonte • Cooper • Gallup • O'Donnell • Smith	Bloodflowers (Australasian version) (2000)	6:27
12.	"Signal to Noise (Acoustic Version)"	Bamonte • Cooper • Gallup • O'Donnell • Smith	Previously unreleased	3:36
13.	"Signal to Noise"	Bamonte • Cooper • Gallup • O'Donnell • Smith	"Cut Here" (2001)	4:07
14.	"Just Say Yes (Curve Remix)"	Bamonte • Cooper • Gallup • O'Donnell • Smith	Previously unreleased (Originally made in 2001)	3:18
15.	"A Forest (Plati and Slick Version)"	Bamonte • Cooper • Gallup • O'Donnell • Smith	Previously unreleased (Originally made in 2001)	6:41

== Charts ==
Chart performance for Join the Dots: B-Sides & Rarities 1978–2001 (The Fiction Years)
Chart (2004)	Peak position
Belgian Albums (Ultratop Flanders)	60
Belgian Albums (Ultratop Wallonia)	46
French Albums (SNEP)	29
Italian Albums (FIMI)	50
UK Albums (Official Charts)	98
UK Rock & Metal Albums (Official Charts)	13
US Billboard 200	106
