= Perfect as Cats: A Tribute to the Cure =

Perfect As Cats: A Tribute to the Cure

Compilation album by various artists
- Released: October 28, 2008
- Label: Manimal Vinyl

Perfect as Cats: A Tribute to the Cure is a charity record released by Los Angeles indie label Manimal Vinyl on October 28, 2008. It features covers of the Cure favourites by the Dandy Warhols, Bat for Lashes, Kaki King, the Devastations, ex-Godflesh frontman, Justin Broadrick's Jesu, Rio en Medio, Lewis & Clarke, Sarabeth Tucek, Mariee Siou, Xu Xu Fang, Blackblack, Gangi, Rainbow Arabia and over 20 more artists and bands. The record was mastered by Xu Xu Fang's Bobby Tamkin. The proceeds of the album went to the Invisible Children charity which works with the war-torn youth in Sudan.

Pitchfork rated the album a 3.9.

== Track listing ==
Disc one

No.	Title	Artist	Length
1.	"Fascination Street" (from Disintegration, 1989)	Xu Xu Fang	5:37
2.	"A Forest" (from Seventeen Seconds, 1980)	Bat for Lashes	3:23
3.	"Killing an Arab" (from Boys Don't Cry, 1980)	Hecuba	2:57
4.	"The Walk 1" (single, 1983)	Indian Jewelry	5:47
5.	"The Walk 2" (single, 1983)	Geneva Jacuzzi	3:40
6.	"The Caterpillar" (from The Top, 1984)	Astrid Quay and Ariel Pink	3:52
7.	"Six Different Ways" (from The Head on the Door, 1985)	Rainbow Arabia	2:45
8.	"Why Can't I Be You?" (from Kiss Me, Kiss Me, Kiss Me, 1987)	We Are the World	3:30
9.	"In Between Days" (from The Head on the Door, 1985)	Blackblack	2:50
10.	"10:15 Saturday Night" (from Three Imaginary Boys, 1979)	Aquaserge with Laure Briard	5:19
11.	"Fire in Cairo" (from Three Imaginary Boys, 1979)	Gangi	4:09
12.	"Pictures of You" (from Disintegration, 1989)	Rio en Medio	4:35
13.	"Kyoto Song" (from The Head on the Door, 1985)	Joker's Daughter	3:57
14.	"The Drowning Man" (from Faith, 1981)	Caroline Weeks	3:54
15.	"The Hanging Garden" (from Pornography, 1982)	Ex Reverie	4:53
16.	"M" (from Seventeen Seconds, 1980)	Voyager One	3:33
17.	"All Cats Are Grey" (from Faith, 1981)	The Devastations	6:39

Disc two

No.	Title	Artist	Length
1.	"Primary" (from Faith, 1981)	The Dandy Warhols	4:23
2.	"The Upstairs Room" (from "The Walk" B-side, 1983)	Veil Veil Vanish	3:30
3.	"Charlotte Sometimes" (single, 1981)	Wolfkin	4:25
4.	"Jumping Someone Else's Train" (single, 1979)	Army Navy	5:31
5.	"Grinding Halt" (from Three Imaginary Boys, 1979)	The Muslims	2:49
6.	"The Exploding Boy" ("In Between Days" B-side, 1985)	Lemon Sun	3:26
7.	"Close to Me" (from The Head on the Door, 1985)	Kaki King	3:37
8.	"Hot Hot Hot!!!" (from Kiss Me, Kiss Me, Kiss Me, 1987)	Les Bicyclettes Blanches	3:52
9.	"Sugar Girl" ("Just Like Heaven" B-side, 1987)	Buddy	4:07
10.	"The Lovecats" (single, 1983)	Katrine Ottosen	4:42
11.	"Lovesong" (from Disintegration, 1989)	Mariee Siou	3:51
12.	"The Kiss" (from Kiss Me, Kiss Me, Kiss Me, 1987)	Corridor	7:06
13.	"Let's Go to Bed" (single, 1982)	Tara Busch	4:16
14.	"The Funeral Party" (from Faith, 1981)	Jesu	6:52
15.	"Three Imaginary Boys" (from Three Imaginary Boys, 1979)	Sarabeth Tucek	3:42
16.	"Disintegration" (from Disintegration, 1989)	Lewis & Clarke	8:48

Additionally, several more tracks were available as iTunes exclusives:

No.	Title	Artist	Length
1.	"A Strange Day" (from Pornography, 1982)	Ich Bin Aiko	4:11
2.	"A Night Like This" (from The Head on the Door, 1985)	Silver Summit	4:39
3.	"The Baby Screams" (from The Head on the Door, 1985)	Black Hole Oscillators	2:42
4.	"One Hundred Years" (from Pornography, 1982)	The Holy Kiss	7:11
