= Mixed Up (The Cure album) =

1990 remix album by the Cure

Remix album by the Cure
- Released: 20 November 1990
- Recorded: 1989–1990
- Studio: Outside (England)
- Length: 73:04
- Label: Fiction
- Producers: Robert Smith; Chris Parry; Mark Saunders; Dave Allen

The Cure chronology
Disintegration (1989)	Mixed Up (1990)	Entreat (1991)

Singles from Mixed Up
- 1. "Never Enough" Released: 17 September 1990; 2. "Close to Me (remix)" Released: 22 October 1990; 3. "A Forest (Tree Mix)" Released: 6 December 1990

Professional ratings
Review scores
Source	Rating
AllMusic	2/5 stars
Entertainment Weekly	C
NME	3/5 stars
Record Mirror	2.5/5 stars
The Rolling Stone Album Guide	1/5 stars
Stylus Magazine	Positive
Pitchfork	8.0/10

Mixed Up is a remix album by the English rock band the Cure, released on 20 November 1990 by Fiction Records. The songs are remixes of some of their hits, reflecting the popularity of remixing of existing songs and dance culture of the late 1980s and early 1990s. In 2018, a sequel remix album was released, titled Torn Down.

Most of the songs are extended mixes. Several had been previously released on 12" singles, but some are completely remade, with Smith recutting vocals due to the original tapes not being available. The record closes with the extended version of a new single, "Never Enough". The remix of "Pictures of You" was originally released under the title "(Strange Mix)". In an interview featured on the Trilogy DVD, singer Robert Smith described the remix album as something "fun after the doom and gloom of Disintegration".

The Cure also released some other new mixes as the B-sides of the singles from Mixed Up: the first single, "Never Enough", featured a remix of "Let's Go to Bed", titled "Let's Go to Bed" (Milk Mix) on the 12", cassette and CD versions, as well as a new song, "Harold and Joe", while the second single, "Close to Me" (Remix) contained "Just Like Heaven" (Dizzy Mix) on all formats and "Primary" (Red Mix) on the 12", CD and cassette versions as B-sides; the third single, "A Forest" (Tree Mix), contained the original version of the song and "In Between Days" (Shiver Mix) only on 5-inch CD as B-sides.

== Reception ==
Ira Robbins of Entertainment Weekly saw the band as trying to stay relevant and their "attempt to join in the trendy dance style known as house music", and thought some of the songs were poor choices, saying they "really don't need the rhythmic charge they get from added drum tracks." and concluded "Fans will need the one new song, ''Never Enough", and two rerecorded oldies, but Mixed Up is a pause that confuses in a career otherwise known for rampant creativity."

Stephen Thomas Erlewine described the remixes as "quite radical" and "leaving only the bare bones of the original song.". He felt that the album featured " enough oddities and rare tracks" to satisfy fans, but was " too specialized for casual listeners."

Steve Lamacq of NME said, "I can see Cure purists, the Smith disciples who enjoy his searching lyricism and uneven vocals, hating this record intensely. A weird, teasing record which marks the latest contrary twist in the band's history."

== Release ==
On 21 April 2018, Mixed Up was released as a 2-LP remastered deluxe edition. The accompanying statement read: "Robert Smith has remastered The Cure's remix album from 1990. Now presented for the first time as double picture disc set in a gatefold sleeve with a download voucher."

A 3-CD remastered deluxe edition of Mixed Up was released on 15 June 2018. and included the original album, a second disc of remixes from 1981 up to 1990, while the third disc would contain a new remix album called Torn Down (2018).

In an interview with BBC Radio 6, Robert Smith confirmed that this release marks the continuation of The Cure's deluxe edition re-release campaign, and that the deluxe edition of Wish had been completed and would follow.

== Track listing ==
=== LP edition ===
Side A
No.	Title	Length
1.	"Lullaby" (Extended Mix)	7:43
2.	"Close to Me" (Closer Mix)	5:44
3.	"Fascination Street" (Extended Mix)	8:47

Side B
No.	Title	Length
4.	"The Walk" (Everything Mix)	5:27
5.	"Lovesong" (Extended Mix)	6:19
6.	"A Forest" (Tree Mix)	6:55

Side C
No.	Title	Length
7.	"Pictures of You" (Extended Dub Mix)	6:41
8.	"Hot Hot Hot!!!" (Extended Mix)	7:01
9.	"Why Can't I Be You?" (Extended Remix; appears on the French 5-CD version, LP and cassette versions only)	8:07

Side D
No.	Title	Length
10.	"The Caterpillar" (Flicker Mix)	5:40
11.	"In Between Days" (Shiver Mix)	6:22
12.	"Never Enough" (Big Mix)	6:07
Total length:		81:12

=== CD edition ===
No.	Title	Length
1.	"Lullaby" (Extended Mix)	7:43
2.	"Close to Me" (Closer Mix)	5:44
3.	"Fascination Street" (Extended Mix)	8:47
4.	"The Walk" (Everything Mix)	5:27
5.	"Lovesong" (Extended Mix)	6:19
6.	"A Forest" (Tree Mix)	6:55
7.	"Pictures of You" (Extended Dub Mix)	6:41
8.	"Hot Hot Hot!!!" (Extended Mix)	7:01
9.	"The Caterpillar" (Flicker Mix)	5:40
10.	"In Between Days" (Shiver Mix)	6:22
11.	"Never Enough" (Big Mix)	6:07
Total length:		73:04

Notes

- CD editions do not include "Why Can't I Be You?" (Extended Remix), this was due to the 74-minute (later 80-minute) limit necessary to be compliant with the Compact Disc standard.
- As the original master tapes could not be found, "A Forest" and "The Walk" are not remixes, they are re-recordings.
- Over time, the CD edition has slightly changed. At the time of release, the words "Mixed Up" at the bottom of the cover were white in a box, but have since changed to black in a box. Also, the order of text on the CD disc has slightly been rearranged. Also, the track listing on the back cover, text in the liner notes and the text on the album cover (bar the small "Mixed Up" at the bottom) were originally a metallic. Now they are grey.

=== 2018 remastered reissue ===
==== CD 1: Mixed Up (remastered by Robert Smith 2018) ====
No.	Title	Length
1.	"Lullaby" (Extended Mix)	7:43
2.	"Close to Me" (Closer Mix)	5:44
3.	"Fascination Street" (Extended Mix)	8:47
4.	"The Walk" (Everything Mix)	5:27
5.	"Lovesong" (Extended Mix)	6:19
6.	"A Forest" (Tree Mix)	6:55
7.	"Pictures of You" (Extended Dub Mix)	6:41
8.	"Hot Hot Hot!!!" (Extended Mix)	7:01
9.	"The Caterpillar" (Flicker Mix)	5:27
10.	"In Between Days" (Shiver Mix)	6:22
11.	"Never Enough" (Big Mix)	6:07

==== CD 2: Remixes 1982–1990: Mixed Up Extras 2018 ====
No.	Title	Length
1.	"Let's Go to Bed" (Extended Mix 1982)	7:44
2.	"Just One Kiss" (Extended Mix 1982)	7:15
3.	"Close to Me" (Extended Mix 1985)	6:31
4.	"Boys Don't Cry" (New Voice Club Mix 1986)	5:29
5.	"Why Can't I Be You?" (Extended Mix 1987)	8:07
6.	"A Japanese Dream" (12" Remix 1987)	5:47
7.	"Pictures of You" (Extended Version 1990)	8:06
8.	"Let's Go to Bed" (Milk Mix 1990)	7:13
9.	"Just Like Heaven" (Dizzy Mix 1990)	3:42
10.	"Primary" (Red Mix 1990)	7:10
11.	"The Lovecats" (TC & Benny Mix 1990)	4:39

==== CD 3: Torn Down: Mixed Up Extras 2018 ====
All songs remixed by Robert Smith.

No.	Title	Album	Length
1.	"Three Imaginary Boys" (Help Me Mix)	Three Imaginary Boys	3:21
2.	"M" (Attack Mix)	Seventeen Seconds	3:07
3.	"The Drowning Man" (Bright Birds Mix)	Faith	4:29
4.	"A Strange Day" (Drowning Waves Mix)	Pornography	5:05
5.	"Just One Kiss" (Remember Mix)	Japanese Whispers	4:57
6.	"Shake Dog Shake" (New Blood Mix)	The Top	5:11
7.	"A Night Like This" (Hello Goodbye Mix)	The Head on the Door	4:24
8.	"Like Cockatoos" (Lonely in the Rain Mix)	Kiss Me, Kiss Me, Kiss Me	3:49
9.	"Plainsong" (Edge of the World Mix)	Disintegration	4:33
10.	"Never Enough" (Time to Kill Mix)	Mixed Up	3:34
11.	"From the Edge of the Deep Green Sea" (Love in Vain Mix)	Wish	6:21
12.	"Want" (Time Mix)	Wild Mood Swings	4:44
13.	"The Last Day of Summer" (31st August Mix)	Bloodflowers	5:44
14.	"Cut Here" (If Only Mix)	Greatest Hits	4:25
15.	"Lost" (Found Mix)	The Cure	3:59
16.	"It's Over" (Whisper Mix)	4:13 Dream	4:54

== Personnel ==
- Robert Smith – vocals, guitar, six-string bass, keyboards
- Simon Gallup – bass
- Porl Thompson – guitar, six-string bass
- Boris Williams – drums
- Roger O'Donnell – keyboards
- Andy Anderson – drums
- Lol Tolhurst – drums

== Charts ==
=== Weekly charts ===
Weekly chart performance for Mixed Up
Chart (1990)	Peak position
Australian Albums (ARIA)	12
Austrian Albums (Ö3 Austria)	24
Canada Top Albums/CDs (RPM)	29
Dutch Albums (Album Top 100)	51
European Albums (Music & Media)	16
German Albums (Offizielle Top 100)	19
Italian Albums (Musica e dischi)	24
New Zealand Albums (RMNZ)	16
Spanish Albums (AFYVE)	13
Swedish Albums (Sverigetopplistan)	31
Swiss Albums (Schweizer Hitparade)	26
UK Albums (Official Charts)	8
US Billboard 200	14

Weekly chart performance for Mixed Up (2018 remastered reissue)
Chart (2018)	Peak position
Austrian Albums (Ö3 Austria)	36
Belgian Albums (Ultratop Flanders)	35
Belgian Albums (Ultratop Wallonia)	36
German Albums (Offizielle Top 100)	18
Hungarian Albums (MAHASZ)	26
Italian Albums (FIMI)	72
Polish Albums (ZPAV)	47
Scottish Albums (Official Charts)	9
Spanish Albums (Promusicae)	87
Swiss Albums (Schweizer Hitparade)	37
UK Albums (Official Charts)	16
US Top Alternative Albums (Billboard)	15
US Top Catalog Albums (Billboard)	49
US Top Rock Albums (Billboard)	37
US Indie Store Album Sales (Billboard)	8

=== Year-end charts ===
Year-end chart performance for Mixed Up
Chart (1991)	Position
US Billboard 200	78

== Certifications ==
Certifications for Mixed Up
Region	Certification	Certified units/sales
Australia (ARIA)	Gold	35,000^{^}
France (SNEP)	Gold	100,000^{*}
Spain (Promusicae)	Gold	50,000^{^}
United Kingdom (BPI)	Gold	100,000^{^}
United States (RIAA)	Platinum	1,000,000^{^}
^{*} Sales figures based on certification alone.^{^} Shipments figures based on certification alone.
