= Standing on a Beach =

1986 greatest hits album by the Cure

Standing on a Beach Staring at the Sea

Greatest hits album by the Cure
- Released: 15 May 1986
- Recorded: 1978–1985
- Length: 45:44 (vinyl edition); 60:40 (CD edition); 85:37 (cassette edition)
- Label: Fiction
- Producer: The Cure

The Cure chronology
The Head on the Door (1985)	Standing on a Beach; Staring at the Sea (1986)	Kiss Me, Kiss Me, Kiss Me (1987)

Professional ratings
Review scores
Source	Rating
AllMusic	5/5 stars
Blender	5/5 stars
Robert Christgau	B+
The Rolling Stone Album Guide	5/5 stars
Sounds	5/5 stars

Standing on a Beach (titled Staring at the Sea in CD format in some countries) is a greatest hits album by the English rock band The Cure, released in the United States on 15 May 1986 by Elektra Records and in the United Kingdom on 19 May 1986 by Fiction Records, marking a decade since the band's founding in 1976. The album's titles are both taken from the opening lyrics of the Cure's debut single, "Killing an Arab".

The "New Voice – New Mix" of "Boys Don't Cry" (released as a single little over a fortnight before Standing on a Beach) was not included on the album; thus the album's singles span only from 1978 to 1985.

"A Forest" on this compilation is the album version (which was also on the 12-inch single) but with the first 59 seconds removed. It is not the 7-inch single edit (which removes a few bars between verses and fades out part way through the guitar solo ending).

The album was critically acclaimed. Stephen Thomas Erlewine of AllMusic called it "one of the finest albums of the '80s".

== Release formats ==
The album was released on vinyl record, compact disc, audio cassette.

The vinyl edition is a collection of all 13 of the Cure's commercially released singles up to that point in chronological order. "10:15 Saturday Night" was dropped though, possibly because it was only released in France.

The CD edition features the same tracks as the vinyl edition, but also includes an extra track from four of the band's albums. The four songs, although not released as singles, all had music videos made for them.

The cassette edition features the same tracks as the vinyl edition, but also contains all of the band's B-sides that had not, to that point, received a long-play release. This excludes "10:15 Saturday Night" from the "Killing an Arab" single, which was released on the Three Imaginary Boys album, "Plastic Passion" from the "Boys Don't Cry" single, which was released on the Boys Don't Cry album, and the five B-sides from the "Let's Go to Bed", "The Walk" and "The Love Cats" singles, which were released on the Japanese Whispers compilation album. However, the B-side "Mr. Pink Eyes" from the 12-inch version of "The Lovecats" was omitted from Japanese Whispers, and so was included on this release.

These releases were accompanied by a video release, a music video collection titled Staring at the Sea: The Images with the same setlist as the CD version of the album. This was released on Betamax and VHS videocassettes, LaserDisc (US and Japan only), Video CD (China only) and VHD (Japan only).

All the B-sides on the cassette edition were also later released on the first disc of the Join the Dots compilation in 2004.

The album has been certified 2× platinum in the US.

== Album art ==
The man featured on the album cover was not a member of the Cure; he was chosen because his appearance fit the desired aesthetic of the album. His name is John Button, and was at the time a retired fisherman. He also appeared in the music video for "Killing an Arab". According to the band's 2005 biography by Jeff Apter, when asked why he agreed to lend his face to the band's media, Button's answer was, "If I can help these youngsters break through, after all, why not?" He also reportedly said that he would buy a record player and listen to one of the band's songs "out of curiosity, just to see".

== Track listing ==
=== Vinyl edition ===
Side A
No.	Title	Writer(s)	Origin	Length
1.	"Killing an Arab"	Robert Smith, Lol Tolhurst, Michael Dempsey	Non-album single (1978)	2:22
2.	"Boys Don't Cry"	Smith, Tolhurst, Dempsey	Non-album single (1979)	2:35
3.	"Jumping Someone Else's Train"	Smith, Tolhurst, Dempsey	Non-album single (1979)	2:54
4.	"A Forest"	Smith, Tolhurst, Simon Gallup, Matthieu Hartley	Seventeen Seconds (1980)	4:53
5.	"Primary"	Smith, Tolhurst, Gallup	Faith (1981)	3:33
6.	"Charlotte Sometimes"	Smith, Tolhurst, Gallup	Non-album single (1981)	4:13
7.	"The Hanging Garden"	Smith, Tolhurst, Gallup	Pornography (1982)	4:21

Side B
No.	Title	Writer(s)	Origin	Length
1.	"Let's Go to Bed"	Smith, Tolhurst	Non-album single (1982)	3:33
2.	"The Walk"	Smith, Tolhurst	Non-album single (1983)	3:28
3.	"The Love Cats"	Smith	Non-album single (1983)	3:38
4.	"The Caterpillar"	Smith, Tolhurst	The Top (1984)	3:38
5.	"In Between Days"	Smith	The Head on the Door (1985)	2:56
6.	"Close to Me"	Smith	The Head on the Door	3:39

=== CD/video editions ===
CD and video edition track listing
No.	Title	Writer(s)	Origin	Length
1.	"Killing an Arab"	Smith, Tolhurst, Dempsey	Non-album single (1978)	2:22
2.	"10:15 Saturday Night"	Smith, Tolhurst, Dempsey	Three Imaginary Boys (1979)	3:37
3.	"Boys Don't Cry"	Smith, Tolhurst, Dempsey	Non-album single (1979)	2:35
4.	"Jumping Someone Else's Train"	Smith, Tolhurst, Dempsey	Non-album single (1979)	2:54
5.	"A Forest"	Smith, Tolhurst, Gallup, Hartley	Seventeen Seconds (1980)	4:53
6.	"Play for Today"	Smith, Tolhurst, Gallup, Hartley	Seventeen Seconds	3:41
7.	"Primary"	Smith, Tolhurst, Gallup	Faith (1981)	3:33
8.	"Other Voices"	Smith, Tolhurst, Gallup	Faith	4:27
9.	"Charlotte Sometimes"	Smith, Tolhurst, Gallup	Non-album single (1981)	4:13
10.	"The Hanging Garden"	Smith, Tolhurst, Gallup	Pornography (1982)	4:21
11.	"Let's Go to Bed"	Smith, Tolhurst	Non-album single (1982)	3:33
12.	"The Walk"	Smith, Tolhurst	Non-album single (1983)	3:28
13.	"The Love Cats"	Smith	Non-album single (1983)	3:38
14.	"The Caterpillar"	Smith, Tolhurst	The Top (1984)	3:38
15.	"In Between Days"	Smith	The Head on the Door (1985)	2:56
16.	"Close to Me"	Smith	The Head on the Door	3:39
17.	"A Night Like This"	Smith	The Head on the Door	4:11
Total length:				1:01:39

=== Cassette edition ===
==== Side 1: Standing on a Beach – The Singles ====
1. "Killing an Arab" (Smith, Tolhurst, Dempsey) – 2:22
2. "Boys Don't Cry" (Smith, Tolhurst, Dempsey) – 2:35
3. "Jumping Someone Else's Train" (Smith, Tolhurst, Dempsey) – 2:54
4. "A Forest" (Smith) – 4:53
5. "Primary" (Smith, Tolhurst, Gallup) – 3:33
6. "Charlotte Sometimes" (Smith, Tolhurst, Gallup) – 4:13
7. "The Hanging Garden" (Smith, Tolhurst, Gallup) – 4:21
8. "Let's Go to Bed" (Smith, Tolhurst) – 3:33
9. "The Walk" (Smith, Tolhurst) – 3:28
10. "The Lovecats" (Smith) – 3:38
11. "The Caterpillar" (Smith, Tolhurst) – 3:38
12. "In Between Days" (Smith) – 2:56
13. "Close to Me" (Smith) – 3:39

==== Side 2: Standing on a Beach – The B-Sides ====
1. "I'm Cold" (Smith, Tolhurst, Dempsey) – 2:47 (from "Jumping Someone Else's Train")
2. "Another Journey by Train" (Smith, Gallup, Tolhurst, Hartley) – 3:04 (from "A Forest")
3. "Descent" (Smith, Gallup, Tolhurst) – 3:07 (from "Primary")
4. "Splintered in Her Head" (Smith, Gallup, Tolhurst) – 5:16 (from "Charlotte Sometimes")
5. "Mr Pink Eyes" (Smith, Tolhurst) – 2:42 (from "The Love Cats")
6. "Happy the Man" (Smith) – 2:45 (from "The Caterpillar")
7. "Throw Your Foot" (Smith) – 3:33 (from "The Caterpillar")
8. "The Exploding Boy" (Smith) – 2:52 (from "In Between Days")
9. "A Few Hours After This" (Smith) – 2:26 (from "In Between Days")
10. "A Man Inside My Mouth" (Smith) – 3:05 (from "Close to Me"/Half an Octopuss)
11. "Stop Dead" (Smith) – 4:02 (from "In Between Days"/"Close to Me"/Half an Octopuss)
12. "New Day" (Smith, Tolhurst) – 4:08 (from "Close to Me"/ Half an Octopuss)

=== Comparison ===
Presented here is a comparison showing in what format each of the 29 songs on the album can be found, with the position number of that song on that particular format.

Comparison of songs on each edition
Song	Vinyl LP	CD and VHS	Cassette
"10:15 Saturday Night"		2	
"A Few Hours After This"			22
"A Forest"	4	5	4
"A Man Inside My Mouth"			23
"A Night Like This"		17	
"Another Journey By Train"			15
"Boys Don't Cry"	2	3	2
"The Caterpillar"	11	14	11
"Charlotte Sometimes"	6	9	6
"Close to Me"	13	16	13
"Descent"			16
"The Exploding Boy"			21
"The Hanging Garden"	7	10	7
"Happy the Man"			19
"I'm Cold"			14
"In Between Days"	12	15	12
"Jumping Someone Else's Train"	3	4	3
"Killing an Arab"	1	1	1
"Let's Go to Bed"	8	11	8
"The Love Cats"	10	13	10
"Mr Pink Eyes"			18
"New Day"			25
"Other Voices"		8	
"Play for Today"		6	
"Primary"	5	7	5
"Splintered in Her Head"			17
"Stop Dead"			24
"Throw Your Foot"			20
"The Walk"	9	12	9

== Personnel ==
- Robert Smith – vocals (all tracks); guitar (all except "Close to Me"); keyboards ("Charlotte Sometimes", "The Hanging Garden", "Let’s Go to Bed", "The Walk", "The Lovecats"); bass, violin ("The Caterpillar")
- Lol Tolhurst – drums ("Killing an Arab", "10:15 Saturday Night", "Boys Don’t Cry", "Jumping on Someone Else’s Train", "A Forest", "Play for Today", "Primary", "Other Voices", "Charlotte Sometimes", "The Hanging Garden"); keyboards ("Let’s Go to Bed", "The Walk", "The Caterpillar", "In Between Days", "Close To Me", "A Night Like This"); drum machine ("The Walk"); vibraphone ("The Lovecats")
- Michael Dempsey – bass ("Killing an Arab", "10:15 Saturday Night", "Boys Don’t Cry", "Jumping on Someone Else’s Train")
- Simon Gallup – bass ("A Forest", "Play for Today", "Primary", "Other Voices", "Charlotte Sometimes", "The Hanging Garden", "In Between Days", "Close to Me", "A Night Like This")
- Matthieu Hartley – keyboards ("A Forest", "Play for Today")
- Steve Goulding – drums ("Let’s Go to Bed")
- Andy Anderson – drums ("The Lovecats", "The Caterpillar")
- Phil Thornalley – double bass ("The Lovecats")
- Porl Thompson – keyboards ("In Between Days", "Close to Me", "A Night Like This")
- Boris Williams – drums ("In Between Days", "Close to Me", "A Night Like This")

== Charts ==
=== Weekly charts ===
1986 weekly chart performance for Standing on a Beach
Chart (1986)	Peak position
Australian Albums (Kent Music Report)	13
Canada Top Albums/CDs (RPM)	48
Dutch Albums (Album Top 100)	6
European Albums (Music & Media)	6
German Albums (Offizielle Top 100)	11
New Zealand Albums (RMNZ)	3
Swedish Albums (Sverigetopplistan)	27
Swiss Albums (Schweizer Hitparade)	11
UK Albums (Official Charts)	4
US Billboard 200	48

2016 weekly chart performance for Standing on a Beach
Chart (2016)	Peak position
French Albums (SNEP)	154

2025 weekly chart performance for Staring at the Sea
Chart (2025)	Peak position
Greek Albums (IFPI)	11

=== Year-end charts ===
Year-end chart performance for Standing on a Beach
Chart (1986)	Position
Australian Albums (Kent Music Report)	64
Dutch Albums (Album Top 100)	41
European Albums (Music & Media)	28
German Albums (Offizielle Top 100)	44
New Zealand Albums (RMNZ)	26
UK Albums (OCC)	54

== Certifications and sales ==
Certifications and sales for Standing on a Beach
Region	Certification	Certified units/sales
Australia (ARIA)	3× Platinum	210,000^{^}
France (SNEP)	2× Gold	200,000^{*}
Germany (BVMI)	Gold	250,000^{^}
Netherlands (NVPI)	Gold	50,000^{^}
New Zealand (RMNZ)	Platinum	15,000^{^}
Switzerland (IFPI Switzerland)	Gold	25,000^{^}
United Kingdom (BPI)	Gold	100,000^{^}
United States (RIAA)	2× Platinum	2,000,000^{^}
Summaries
Worldwide	—	4,000,000
^{*} Sales figures based on certification alone.^{^} Shipments figures based on certification alone.
