= The Cure in Orange =

Video by The Cure
- Released: 12 November 1987
- Recorded: August 8–10, 1986
- Length: 94:46
- Label: Fiction; Elektra
- Director: Tim Pope
- Producer: Gordon Lewis

The Cure in Orange is a concert film by English rock band the Cure released on 12 November 1987. It was shot on 35mm film at the Théâtre antique d'Orange in the French countryside Orange, Vaucluse, on 8, 9, and 10 August 1986. The film was the band's first concert film and was directed by Tim Pope.

== Release ==
The film was released on VHS and laserdisc in 1987 by Fiction in the UK and Elektra Entertainment in the US.

Robert Smith stated in 2009 that there was going to be a DVD release of the film due for release in 2010.However, there remains no official release on DVD.

== Critical reception ==
Time Out London described it as "An astonishingly lavish production number for one of the world's less dynamic live bands, rendered noteworthy by its setting against the magnificent backdrop of an ancient amphitheatre [...] for Cure fans this is as perfect and cinematographically compelling a record of a gig as could be asked for. [As] for the rest of us, it's a bit of a yawn."

Richard Cromelin of Los Angeles Times was more reserved in its praise, claiming it was "a Cure fan’s delight, but it could have been more if Pope had tried to find a story somewhere in the show." and said that other concert films, such as Talking Heads' Stop Making Sense (1984) and the Band's The Last Waltz, were greater than the Cure's performance, saying the group were "hardly in that league." He also criticised the band's performance, calling them "pretty drab as performers."

Ned Raggett of AllMusic gave it four out of five stars, praising the mixing and production as "pristine". He also claimed it "remains one of the last honest-to-goodness concert films before most such live documents became specifically video or later Internet-only releases. " and believed it, "would have made an excellent live album" and concluded, is ample testimony to both the Cure's excellence and Pope's ability to showcase them at their best."

== Set List ==
- "Introduction", Recording of "Relax", from the album Blue Sunshine by The Glove
- "Shake Dog Shake" (The Top)
- "Piggy in the Mirror" (The Top)
- "Play for Today" (Seventeen Seconds)
- "A Strange Day" (Pornography)
- "Primary" (Faith)
- "Kyoto Song" (The Head On The Door)
- "Charlotte Sometimes" (stand-alone single)
- "In Between Days" (The Head On The Door)
- "The Walk" (Japanese Whispers)
- "A Night Like This" (The Head On The Door)
- "Push" (The Head On The Door)
- "One Hundred Years"(Pornography)
- "A Forest" (Seventeen Seconds)
- "Sinking" (The Head On The Door)
- "Close to Me" (The Head On The Door)
- "Let's Go to Bed" (Japanese Whispers)
- "Six Different Ways" (The Head On The Door)
- "Three Imaginary Boys" (Three Imaginary Boys)
- "Boys Don't Cry" (Boys Don't Cry)
- "Faith" (Faith)
- "Give Me It" (The Top)
- "10:15 Saturday Night" (Three Imaginary Boys)
- "Killing an Arab" (Boys Don't Cry)
- "Sweet Talking Guy" (Performed by The Chiffons over credits.)

== Personnel ==
- Robert Smith – vocals, guitar, 6-string bass
- Lol Tolhurst – keyboards
- Simon Gallup – bass guitar
- Porl Thompson – keyboards, guitar, 6-string bass, saxophone
- Boris Williams – drums, percussion
