= Bestival Live 2011 =

Live album by The Cure
- Released: 2 December 2011
- Recorded: 2011
- Length: 140:40
- Producer: The Cure, Keith Uddin

The Cure chronology
4:13 Dream (2008)	Bestival Live 2011 (2011)	Torn Down (2018)

Professional ratings
Aggregate scores
Source	Rating
Metacritic	(77/100)
Review scores
Source	Rating
AllMusic	3.5/5 stars
BBC Music	(favorable)
Consequence of Sound	4.5/5 stars
Drowned in Sound	(7/10)
Entertainment Weekly	A−
Pitchfork	(5.8/10)
PopMatters	7/10 stars
Uncut	4/5 stars

Bestival Live 2011 is a live album recorded by the English rock band The Cure during Bestival 2011 music festival in September 2011. It was first released in Germany on 2 December 2011, before being released in the UK on 5 December 2011. It is the band's first live album since Paris, which was released in 1993.

All profits from the sale of the album went to the Isle of Wight Youth Trust.

== Reception ==
Ned Raggett of Allmusic gave the album three and a half stars and felt the album was "an understandably honest reflection of the Cure in the popular mind as their commercial high point recedes further into the past, but given Smith and the band's other contemporaneous activities, it's an incomplete portrait."

Popmatters praised the album, saying. "They've written material that holds up through the looking glass of time, and Bestival is ultimately a testament to a band running through the hits with some level of gusto and verve, making them seem fresh and exciting so many years removed from their gestation."

Pitchfork gave the album a score of 5.8, and criticised the fact the band chose to change the title of "Killing an Arab", due to controversy, ""Killing an Arab" was misinterpreted by the same people Smith lashed out against on Cure's very embarrassing political rant "Us or Them" as being racially insensitive post-9/11, but it's just profoundly depressing to hear the song rendered all but completely meaningless when the mass setting should make it all the more resonant." and thought, "the Cure feel like less of a band than a traveling museum or theme park celebrating their past with the occasional new exhibit or ride to stoke interest. In other words, a completely user-driven experience en masse"

== Track listing ==
=== Disc 1 ===
1. "Plainsong" – 5:10
2. "Open" – 6:53
3. "Fascination Street" – 4:58
4. "A Night Like This" – 4:10
5. "The End of the World" – 3:40
6. "Lovesong" – 3:35
7. "Just Like Heaven" – 3:47
8. "The Only One" – 4:14
9. "The Walk" – 3:31
10. "Push" – 4:37
11. "Friday I'm in Love" – 3:34
12. "In Between Days" – 2:58
13. "Play for Today" – 4:06
14. "A Forest" – 6:35
15. "Primary" – 4:20
16. "Shake Dog Shake" – 4:44

=== Disc 2 ===
1. "The Hungry Ghost" – 4:48
2. "One Hundred Years" – 6:50
3. "End" – 6:11
4. "Disintegration" – 8:31
5. "Lullaby" – 4:43
6. "The Lovecats" – 3:50
7. "The Caterpillar" – 3:56
8. "Close to Me" – 3:37
9. "Hot Hot Hot!!!" – 3:34
10. "Let's Go to Bed" – 3:36
11. "Why Can't I Be You?" – 3:27
12. "Boys Don't Cry" – 3:05
13. "Jumping Someone Else's Train" – 3:11
14. "Grinding Halt" – 3:11
15. "10:15 Saturday Night" – 3:41
16. "Killing Another" – 3:37

== Personnel ==
- Robert Smith – vocals, guitar
- Simon Gallup – bass guitar
- Jason Cooper – drums
- Roger O'Donnell – keyboard
