= Greatest Hits (The Cure album) =

Greatest hits album by the Cure
- Released: 7 November 2001
- Recorded: 1979–2001
- Genres: Alternative rock; post-punk; gothic rock; new wave; goth-pop
- Length: 68:08; 69:26 (bonus disc)
- Labels: Fiction; Polydor

The Cure chronology
Bloodflowers (2000)	Greatest Hits (2001)	Join the Dots (2004)

Singles from The Cure: Greatest Hits
- 1. "Cut Here" Released: October 2001; 2. "Just Say Yes" Released: December 2001

Professional ratings
Review scores
Source	Rating
AllMusic	3/5 stars
Alternative Press	4.5/5 stars
musicOMH	(average)
Q	4/5 stars
The Rolling Stone Album Guide	4/5 stars

Greatest Hits is a greatest hits album by the English rock band the Cure. It was first released in Japan on 7 November 2001, before being released in the UK and Europe on 12 November and then in the US the day after. The band's relationship with longtime label Fiction Records came to a close, and the Cure were obliged to release one final album for the label. Lead singer Robert Smith agreed to release a greatest hits album under the condition that he could choose the tracks himself. The band also recorded a special studio album released as a bonus disc to some versions of the album. The disc, titled Acoustic Hits, consists of the eighteen songs from the international release re-recorded using acoustic instruments.

== History ==
Greatest Hits features select singles from the Cure's then-25 year history, along with the two new tracks "Cut Here" and "Just Say Yes". All songs were newly remastered by Tim Young at Metropolis Mastering specifically for the collection.

The UK and international editions of the album feature a similar track listing, with the exception of three songs that only appear on one or the other: the international release features "The Walk", while the UK/Japan release excludes it in favour of "The Caterpillar" and "Pictures of You".

In an effort to provide something new for the hardcore fans who owned the previously released songs, Smith arranged for the band and former member Boris Williams to re-record acoustic versions of the Greatest Hits. Only the select first pressings of Greatest Hits were bundled with the bonus disc of Acoustic Hits.

Greatest Hits was also released on VHS and DVD. The video track listing mirrors that of the North American audio CD, with the exception of "The Caterpillar", "Pictures of You" and "Close to Me (Closest Mix)" which appear as hidden Easter eggs. Six of the acoustic performances also appear on the DVD.

The first vinyl version of this album was released on Record Store Day 2017 (22 April 2017) as two LP picture discs by the label Elektra Catalog Group. A quantity of 3250 were pressed. The release does not include the content of the Acoustic Hits disc, which was given its own standalone release on standard black vinyl. On 5 July 2019, the album reached a new peak of number 19 in the UK Albums Chart following the Cure's headline set at that year's Glastonbury Festival.

== Track listing ==
All lyrics are written by Robert Smith.

UK release
No.	Title	Music	Original album	Length
1.	"Boys Don't Cry"	Smith; Lol Tolhurst; Michael Dempsey	Non-album single (1979)	2:42
2.	"A Forest" (Shortened Edit)	Smith; Tolhurst; Simon Gallup; Matthieu Hartley	Seventeen Seconds (1980)	4:44
3.	"Let's Go to Bed"	Smith; Tolhurst	Non-album single (1982)	3:34
4.	"The Love Cats"	Smith	Non-album single (1983)	3:40
5.	"The Caterpillar"	Smith	The Top	3:40
6.	"In Between Days"	Smith	The Head on the Door (1985)	2:58
7.	"Close to Me" (Remix)	Smith	The Head on the Door	3:42
8.	"Why Can't I Be You?"	Smith; Gallup; Porl Thompson; Boris Williams; Tolhurst	Kiss Me, Kiss Me, Kiss Me (1987)	3:14
9.	"Just Like Heaven" (Remix)	Smith; Gallup; Thompson; Williams; Tolhurst	Kiss Me, Kiss Me, Kiss Me	3:32
10.	"Lullaby" (Remix)	Smith; Gallup; Thompson; Williams; Roger O'Donnell; Tolhurst	Disintegration (1989)	4:11
11.	"Lovesong" (Remix)	Smith; Gallup; Thompson; Williams; O'Donnell; Tolhurst	Disintegration	3:28
12.	"Pictures of You" (Remix)	Smith; Gallup; Thompson; Williams; O'Donnell; Tolhurst	Disintegration	4:46
13.	"Never Enough" (Single Mix)	Smith; Gallup; Thompson; Williams	Mixed Up (1990)	4:28
14.	"High" (Single Mix)	Smith; Gallup; Thompson; Williams; Perry Bamonte	Wish (1992)	3:35
15.	"Friday I'm in Love"	Smith; Gallup; Thompson; Williams; Bamonte	Wish	3:35
16.	"Mint Car" (Radio Mix)	Smith; Gallup; Bamonte; Jason Cooper; O'Donnell	Wild Mood Swings (1996)	3:29
17.	"Wrong Number" ((Single Mix))	Smith	Galore (1997)	6:01
18.	"Cut Here"	Smith; Gallup; Bamonte; Cooper; O'Donnell	Previously unreleased	4:10
19.	"Just Say Yes"	Smith; Gallup; Bamonte; Cooper; O'Donnell	Previously unreleased	3:29

International release

1. "Boys Don't Cry"
2. "A Forest" (Shortened Edit)
3. "Let's Go to Bed"
4. "The Walk" Non-album single (1983)
5. "The Lovecats"
6. "In Between Days"
7. "Close to Me" (Remix)
8. "Why Can't I Be You?"
9. "Just Like Heaven" (Bob Clearmountain Remix)
10. "Lullaby" (Remix)
11. "Lovesong" (Remix)
12. "Never Enough" (Single Mix)
13. "High" (Single Mix)
14. "Friday I'm in Love"
15. "Mint Car" (Radio Mix)
16. "Wrong Number" (Single Mix)
17. "Cut Here"
18. "Just Say Yes"

Bonus disc (Acoustic Hits)

Acoustic Hits, the bonus disc features newly recorded acoustic versions of songs.

1. "Boys Don't Cry"
2. "A Forest"
3. "Let's Go to Bed"
4. "The Walk"
5. "The Love Cats"
6. "In Between Days"
7. "Close to Me"
8. "Why Can't I Be You?"
9. "Just Like Heaven"
10. "Lullaby"
11. "Lovesong"
12. "Never Enough"
13. "High"
14. "Friday I'm in Love"
15. "Mint Car"
16. "Wrong Number"
17. "Cut Here"
18. "Just Say Yes"

Record Store Day 2017 release

Disc 1, Side A

1. "Boys Don't Cry"
2. "A Forest"
3. "Let's Go to Bed"
4. "The Walk"
5. "The Love Cats"

Disc 1, Side B

1. "In Between Days"
2. "Close to Me"
3. "Why Can't I Be You?"
4. "Just Like Heaven"
5. "Lullaby"

Disc 2, Side A

1. "Lovesong"
2. "Never Enough"
3. "High"
4. "Friday I'm in Love"

Disc 2, Side B

1. "Mint Car"
2. "Wrong Number"
3. "Cut Here"
4. "Just Say Yes"

== Personnel ==
The following is the personnel for the Greatest Hits disc, and does not apply to the Acoustic Hits bonus disc. Credits taken from UK release CD booklet.

- Robert Smith – vocals, guitar (all tracks); keyboards (tracks 3–11, 13–18); Bass VI (tracks 6, 9, 10, 13, 17); bass guitar (track 3, 16)
- Porl Thompson – guitar (tracks 6–14), keyboards (tracks 6–9)
- Reeves Gabrels – guitar (track 16)
- Michael Dempsey – bass guitar (track 1)
- Simon Gallup – bass guitar (tracks 2, 6–15, 17)
- Perry Bamonte – guitar (tracks 15, 17, 18), keyboards (tracks 13, 14)
- Matthieu Hartley – keyboards (track 2)
- Roger O'Donnell – keyboards (tracks 10, 11, 15, 17, 18)
- Lol Tolhurst – drums (tracks 1 and 2), keyboards (tracks 3, 6–9); drum machine (track 4); vibraphone (track 5); "other instrument" (tracks 10, 11)
- Steve Goulding – drums (track 3)
- Jason Cooper – drums (tracks 15–18)
- Boris Williams – drums (tracks 6–14)
- Andy Anderson – drums (track 5)
- Phil Thornalley – double bass (track 5)
- Saffron – backing vocals (track 18)
- Tim Young – remastering at Metropolis Mastering

== Charts ==
2001–2002 chart performance for Greatest Hits
Chart (2001–2002)	Peak position
Australian Albums (ARIA)	27
Austrian Albums (Ö3 Austria)	34
Belgian Albums (Ultratop Flanders)	5
Belgian Albums (Ultratop Wallonia)	8
Danish Albums (Hitlisten)	38
European Albums (Music & Media)	30
German Albums (Offizielle Top 100)	22
Greek Albums (IFPI)	8
Irish Albums (IRMA)	11
Italian Albums (FIMI)	30
Norwegian Albums (VG-lista)	24
Polish Albums (ZPAV)	18
Scottish Albums (Official Charts)	47
Spanish Albums (AFYVE)	29
Swedish Albums (Sverigetopplistan)	48
Swiss Albums (Schweizer Hitparade)	24
UK Albums (Official Charts)	33
US Billboard 200	58

2016 chart performance for Greatest Hits
Chart (2016)	Peak position
Australian Albums (ARIA)	27
New Zealand Albums (RMNZ)	17

Chart performance for Greatest Hits (2017 remastered reissue)
Chart (2017)	Peak position
Irish Albums (Official Charts)	17
Portuguese Albums (AFP)	33
Scottish Albums (Official Charts)	58
UK Albums (Official Charts)	48
US Indie Store Album Sales (Billboard)	9

2019 chart performance for Greatest Hits
Chart (2019)	Peak position
Scottish Albums (Official Charts)	21
UK Albums (Official Charts)	19

2025 chart performance for Greatest Hits
Chart (2025)	Peak position
Greek Albums (IFPI)	4

2026 chart performance for Greatest Hits
Chart (2026)	Peak position
Croatian International Albums (HDU)	12

Chart performance for Acoustic Hits
Chart (2017)	Peak position
Belgian Albums (Ultratop Wallonia)	156
Dutch Albums (Album Top 100)	110
Irish Albums (IRMA)	65
UK Albums Sales (OCC)	65
UK Physical Albums (OCC)	53
UK Vinyl Albums (OCC)	10
US Indie Store Album Sales (Billboard)	22

== Certifications ==
Certifications for Greatest Hits
Region	Certification	Certified units/sales
Argentina (CAPIF)	Platinum	40,000^{^}
Australia (ARIA)	2× Platinum	140,000^{^}
Belgium (BRMA)	Gold	25,000^{*}
Germany (BVMI)	Platinum	300,000^{‡}
Italy (FIMI)	Gold	25,000^{*}
United Kingdom (BPI)	4× Platinum	1,200,000^{‡}
Summaries
Europe (IFPI)	Platinum	1,000,000^{*}
^{*} Sales figures based on certification alone.^{^} Shipments figures based on certification alone.^{‡} Sales+streaming figures based on certification alone.
