= Torn Down =

Remix album by The Cure
- Released: 21 April 2018
- Length: 72:57

The Cure chronology
| Bestival Live 2011 (2011) | Torn Down (2018) | Songs of a Lost World (2024) |

Torn Down is a 2018 remix album by the British alternative rock band The Cure, and a sequel to the 1990 remix album Mixed Up. It was released on Record Store Day 2018 (21 April, Robert Smith's 59th birthday), as was a remastered version of Mixed Up. A three-disc deluxe edition also includes Mixed Up Extras 2018: Remixes 1982–1990 on disc 2, featuring additional remastered material.

The project was announced in 2009, with Robert Smith saying in 2012 that the double album would consist of "our favourite bands remixing Cure songs", but the final product instead features sixteen new mixes done by Smith himself, selecting one song from each album in chronological order.

On 13 April 2018, the "Time Mix" of Want debuted on BBC Radio 6. Torn Down was intended to be the last disc in a 3-CD set, with the first being the newly remastered Mixed Up, followed by a "collection of rare 12 inches from '82 til 1990".

Smith said he "just fancied doing some remixes", with one from each album and "remix Cure songs that wouldn't normally be chosen for remixing, songs like "The Drowning Man" — the more sort of esoteric Cure songs."

He said the album continued The Cure's re-release campaign, and that the deluxe edition of Wish had been completed. A 3-disc remastered and expanded 30th-anniversary edition of Wish was released on 25 November 2022.

== Track listing ==
All songs remixed by Robert Smith.

| No. | Title | Album | Length |
|---|---|---|---|
| 1. | "Three Imaginary Boys" (Help Me Mix) | Three Imaginary Boys | 3:23 |
| 2. | "M" (Attack Mix) | Seventeen Seconds | 3:09 |
| 3. | "The Drowning Man" (Bright Birds Mix) | Faith | 4:31 |
| 4. | "A Strange Day" (Drowning Waves Mix) | Pornography | 5:07 |
| 5. | "Just One Kiss" (Remember Mix) | Japanese Whispers | 5:00 |
| 6. | "Shake Dog Shake" (New Blood Mix) | The Top | 5:13 |
| 7. | "A Night Like This" (Hello Goodbye Mix) | The Head on the Door | 4:26 |
| 8. | "Like Cockatoos" (Lonely in the Rain Mix) | Kiss Me, Kiss Me, Kiss Me | 3:51 |
| 9. | "Plainsong" (Edge of the World Mix) | Disintegration | 4:36 |
| 10. | "Never Enough" (Time to Kill Mix) | Mixed Up | 3:36 |
| 11. | "From the Edge of the Deep Green Sea" (Love in Vain Mix) | Wish | 6:24 |
| 12. | "Want" (Time Mix) | Wild Mood Swings | 4:46 |
| 13. | "The Last Day of Summer" (31st August Mix) | Bloodflowers | 5:46 |
| 14. | "Cut Here" (If Only Mix) | Greatest Hits | 4:28 |
| 15. | "Lost" (Found Mix) | The Cure | 4:02 |
| 16. | "It's Over" (Whisper Mix) | 4:13 Dream | 4:56 |
| Total length: | | | 72:57 |

== Personnel ==
- Robert Smith – vocals, guitar, six-string bass, keyboards
- Simon Gallup – bass
