= Never Enough (The Cure song) =

1990 single by the Cure

Single by the Cure

from the album Mixed Up
- B-side: "Harold and Joe"
- Released: 17 September 1990
- Genre: Alternative rock
- Length: 4:28
- Label: Fiction
- Songwriters: Simon Gallup; Robert Smith; Porl Thompson; Boris Williams
- Producers: Robert Smith; Mark Saunders

The Cure singles chronology
"Pictures of You" (1990)	"Never Enough" (1990)	"Close to Me" (remix) (1990)

"Never Enough" is a song by English rock band the Cure, released as a single in September 1990 by Fiction Records from their 1990 remix album, Mixed Up. The song topped the US Billboard Modern Rock Tracks chart, reached number three in Finland, and peaked within the top 20 in Germany, Ireland, Luxembourg, New Zealand, Spain, and the United Kingdom.

== Content ==
Unlike most other Cure songs of this era, the song was unexpectedly guitar-oriented, featuring no synthesizers. On the album, it is subtitled "Big Mix". Although Perry Bamonte is on the single cover and appears in the music video, he does not have a songwriting credit (as do the other four members). While containing no synthesisers, the song was nonetheless influenced by baggy music. The song's largely electronic B-side "Harold and Joe" was described by Chris Ott of Pitchfork as a "phenomenally adorable ecstasy tribute."

== Release ==
Upon release as a single, "Never Enough" topped the Billboard Modern Rock Tracks chart for three weeks, and reached number 13 in the United Kingdom. The song was re-recorded using acoustic guitars for the 2001 Acoustic Hits album, which contains re-recordings of songs by the band, and was released as a bonus disc to Greatest Hits.

== Track listings ==
- 7-inch
1. "Never Enough" – 4:28
2. "Harold and Joe" – 5:05
- 12-inch
1. "Never Enough" (Big Mix) – 6:07
2. "Harold and Joe" – 5:05
3. "Let's Go to Bed" (Milk Mix) – 7:16
- CD and cassette
1. "Never Enough" (Big Mix) – 6:07
2. "Harold and Joe" – 5:05
3. "Let's Go to Bed" (Milk Mix) – 7:16
4. "Never Enough" – 4:28

== Personnel ==
- Robert Smith – vocals, guitar
- Simon Gallup – bass guitar
- Porl Thompson – guitar
- Boris Williams – drums
- Mark Saunders – mixing, remixing

== Charts ==
=== Weekly charts ===
Chart (1990)	Peak position
Australia (ARIA)	22
Belgium (Ultratop 50 Flanders)	28
Europe (Eurochart Hot 100)	36
Finland (Suomen virallinen lista)	3
Germany (GfK)	17
Ireland (IRMA)	6
Luxembourg (Radio Luxembourg)	8
New Zealand (Recorded Music NZ)	11
Spain (AFYVE)	14
Switzerland (Schweizer Hitparade)	22
UK Singles (Official Charts)	13
US Billboard Hot 100	72
US Alternative Airplay (Billboard)	1
US Dance Club Songs (Billboard) with "Let's Go to Bed"	6
US Dance Singles Sales (Billboard) with "Let's Go to Bed"	25
US Mainstream Rock Airplay (Billboard)	33
US Cash Box Top 100	72

=== Year-end charts ===
Chart (1990)	Position
US Modern Rock Tracks (Billboard)	27

== Release history ==
Region	Date	Format(s)	Label(s)	Ref.
United Kingdom	17 September 1990	7-inch vinyl; 12-inch vinyl; CD; cassette	Fiction	
Australia	1 October 1990	7-inch vinyl; 12-inch vinyl; cassette	Fiction	
Japan	10 December 1990	Mini-CD	Polydor; Fiction	

== See also ==
- Number one modern rock hits of 1990
