= Live 2011 =

Live 2011 may refer to:

- Bestival Live 2011, live album recorded by The Cure during Bestival 2011 music festival
- Bring Me Home: Live 2011, live video album by English soul band Sade
- Bon Jovi Live, by Bon Jovi 2011
- Live 2011, by Jason Manford
