= Hot Hot Hot!!! =

Single by the Cure

from the album Kiss Me, Kiss Me, Kiss Me
- B-side: "Hey You!!!" (extended remix)
- Released: 8 February 1988
- Recorded: 1986
- Genre: Funk
- Length: 3:34
- Label: Fiction
- Composers: Robert Smith; Simon Gallup; Boris Williams; Porl Thompson; Lol Tolhurst
- Lyricist: Robert Smith
- Producers: Robert Smith; Dave Allen

The Cure singles chronology
"Just Like Heaven" (1987)	"Hot Hot Hot!!!" (1988)	"Lullaby" (1989)

"Hot Hot Hot!!!" is a single by the British rock band the Cure released on 8 February 1988. It is taken from their 1987 album Kiss Me, Kiss Me, Kiss Me. The song reached number 45 in the UK, and number 18 in Ireland.

== History ==
"Hot Hot Hot!!!" was the fourth single released from the album Kiss Me, Kiss Me, Kiss Me—the band's seventh LP. In early 1988, the song spent three weeks in the UK Singles Chart, peaking at number 45 on 20 February. In the United States, the song reached number 65 on the Billboard Hot 100, while a remix of the track by François Kevorkian charted at numbers 11 and 50 on the Dance Music/Club Play Singles and the Hot Dance Music/Maxi-Singles Sales charts, respectively. It was also a hit in Ireland, spending two weeks there and making number 18 on 18 February 1988. It spent three weeks on the Dutch charts, reaching number 79 there. As with many other singles, the video was directed by Tim Pope, and has been described as "intentionally ridiculous". Filmed in black and white, it featured the band as "dwarves" dressed in 1950s clothes. Notably, the song was omitted from the original CD release of Kiss Me, Kiss Me, Kiss Me, due to time limits with the Red Book CD that was standard at the time. Since 2006, it has been on all re-releases of Kiss Me, Kiss Me, Kiss Me, due to CD limits expanding to 80 minutes.

Before the song proper begins, Robert Smith can be heard singing "she may be the face I can't forget", the first line of "She" by Charles Aznavour.

== Reception ==
In a review of the single for NME in 1988, Steve Lamacq said that the song's dance mix was "spuriously welcoming, but basically a tragedy of trenchfoot" and concluded, "Even I know [Smith has] better stuff hidden in that mop of his". In an undated review, Stewart Mason of AllMusic described the song as the "weakest" of the singles from the album, adding that it has markedly dated and criticised both Smith's lyrics and his vocal performance.

== Re-recordings and cover versions ==
The song appears on disc two of the live album Bestival Live 2011.

== Track listing ==
=== 7-inch: Elektra / 7-69424 (United States) ===
1. "Hot Hot Hot!!!" (Remix) – 3:33
2. "Hey You!!!" (Remix) – 2:23

=== MC: Elektra / 9 66783-4 (United States) ===
1. "Hot Hot Hot!!!" (Remix) – 3:33
2. "Hey You!!!" (Extended Remix) – 4:06
- released in longbox

=== 12-inch: Fiction / Ficsx 28 (United Kingdom) ===
1. "Hot Hot Hot!!!" (Extended Remix) – 7:03
2. "Hot Hot Hot!!!" (Remix) – 3:33
3. "Hey You!!!" (Extended Remix) – 4:06
- All mixes by François Kevorkian
- also released on CD Fixcd 28

== Personnel ==
- Robert Smith – vocals, guitars, keyboards
- Lol Tolhurst – keyboards
- Porl Thompson – guitars
- Simon Gallup – bass
- Boris Williams – drums, percussion

Roger O'Donnell appears playing keyboards in the music video, but does not play on the studio recording.

== Charts ==
Chart performance for "Hot Hot Hot!!!"
Chart (1988)	Peak position
Ireland (IRMA)	18
Netherlands (Single Top 100)	79
UK Singles (Official Charts)	45
US Billboard Hot 100	65
US Dance Club Songs (Billboard)	11
