= Cut Here =

Single by The Cure

from the album Greatest Hits
- B-side: "Signal to Noise"
- Released: 29 October 2001
- Length: 4:10
- Label: Fiction
- Songwriters: Perry Bamonte; Jason Cooper; Simon Gallup; Roger O'Donnell; Robert Smith
- Producers: Robert Smith; Mark Plati

The Cure singles chronology
"Wrong Number" (1997)	"Cut Here" (2001)	"The End of the World" (2004)

"Cut Here" is a song by the English rock band The Cure, released as a single on 29 October 2001 from their best-of compilation Greatest Hits released the same year.

== Content ==
Cure frontman Robert Smith wrote the song in memory of his friend Billy Mackenzie, the lead singer of the new wave band Associates, who committed suicide in 1997. The title of the song does not relate directly to the lyrical content; it is an anagram of "The Cure".

Regarding its musical style, AllMusic wrote that the song "rises with early sounds of Madchester".

== Release ==
The track was released as a single from the band's 2001 Greatest Hits compilation, reaching number 54 on the UK Singles Chart. It is the band's last release for record label Fiction.

The song was re-recorded later in 2001 for the band's Acoustic Hits release, which contains eighteen re-recordings of previous songs by the band using acoustic guitars and was only released as a limited edition bonus disc to said greatest hits album.

== Track listing ==
1. "Cut Here" 4:11
2. "Signal to Noise" 4:06
3. "Cut Here (Missing Remix)" 5:51

== Versions and remixes ==
1. Cut Here 4:11
2. Cut Here (Missing Mix) 5:51
3. Cut Here (If Only Mix 2018 from Torn Down) 4:29
4. Cut Here (Acoustic Re-Recording) 4:11
5. Cut Here (Instrumental Demo 1997) 4:29

Note: The demo was originally called B46 V.3.

== Personnel ==
- Robert Smith – vocals, guitar, 6-string bass, keyboards
- Simon Gallup – bass guitar
- Perry Bamonte – guitar
- Roger O'Donnell – keyboards
- Jason Cooper – drums
