= A Forest =

1980 song by The Cure

Single by the Cure

from the album Seventeen Seconds
- B-side: "Another Journey by Train"
- Released: 8 April 1980
- Recorded: January 1980
- Genre: Gothic rock; post-punk
- Length: 7" – 3:54; 12" and album version – 5:55; Standing on a Beach version – 4:53
- Label: Fiction
- Songwriters: Simon Gallup, Robert Smith, Matthieu Hartley, Lol Tolhurst
- Producers: Mike Hedges, Robert Smith

The Cure singles chronology
"Jumping Someone Else's Train" (1979)	"A Forest" (1980)	"Primary" (1981)

Music videos
- "A Forest" on YouTube
- "A Forest" (TopPop, 1980) on YouTube

"A Forest" is a song by the English rock band the Cure. Co-produced by Mike Hedges and the band's Robert Smith, it was released as a single from the band's second album Seventeen Seconds on 8 April 1980. It was their debut entry on the UK Singles Chart, reaching number 31. The accompanying music video was first shown on BBC's Top of the Pops programme on 24 April 1980.

Recorded and mixed over seven days, along with the rest of the songs from the album, "A Forest" is representative of The Cure's 1980s gothic rock phase. The song has featured on the band's set lists for many years. Several versions have appeared on concert albums, and it was re-recorded, then subsequently remixed and released as a single from Mixed Up in 1990.

== Background and recording ==
Mike Hedges co-produced the album Seventeen Seconds as well as "A Forest" with The Cure's Robert Smith. Hedges had first worked with the band on the track "Killing an Arab." Interviewed in 2004, he did not recall any demos existing for Seventeen Seconds; the band generally played the track in the studio before laying down a backing track to which overdubs were added. At the time of the recording of the album, bass guitarist Simon Gallup and keyboardist Matthieu Hartley had been added to the band's lineup. Gallup had replaced Michael Dempsey, who had departed to join The Associates. Gallup and Hartley joined remaining Cure members Smith (vocals, guitar) and Lol Tolhurst (drums) in late 1979 during the group's Future Pastimes tour, on which "A Forest" was one of the new songs added to their set list.

Due to budgetary restraints, Seventeen Seconds was recorded and mixed in seven days on a budget of between £2,000 and £3,000, which resulted in the band working 16 or 17 hours a day to complete the album. Hedges and Robert Smith knew the song would take more work to complete than other songs on the album, and would require more overdubs. The song was one of the last tracks recorded; the backing tracks were recorded first, followed by touch-ups to the individual parts, then Smith's vocals. Fiction Records owner Chris Parry told Smith that the song had the potential to be a hit if they made it sound "radio-friendly", but Smith refused, stating the way the track sounded was the sound he envisioned in his head. Work on mixing "A Forest" took up much of the final day of sessions for the album.

== Composition and lyrics ==
"A Forest" and its parent album Seventeen Seconds are representative of The Cure's gothic rock phase in the late 1970s and 1980s. The song has also been described as a post-punk track. Cure biographer Jeff Apter refers to "A Forest" as "the definitive early Cure mood piece" and argues the song is the centrepiece of the album. Smith's intention with "A Forest" was to make a song that was "really atmospheric". He has stated it was a pivotal recording for the group, representing "the archetypal Cure sound".

"A Forest" is performed in the key A minor. Initially only the synth, guitar and drums are heard, followed by the introduction of the bass guitar and a second guitar part. The song initially follows an Am–C–F–Dm progression. Later on the track, its bridge contains a B–C–F♯m–C–B–C sequence, which ends with a chromatic movement to the F chord before returning to Am. Following the echoing repetition of the word "again", a guitar solo appears which avoids string bends and moving in a pentatonic manner. The single version of the song fades out at around four minutes, while on the longer (album) version the instruments exit one by one, concluding with the sound of the bass guitar at 5:46". The sound of Smith's guitar was a departure from that prevalent in the 1970s. Mike Hedges favored the use of flanging at the time, and he estimated that there were seven flanger devices used on "A Forest." Rikky Rooksby said that the slow phase effect heard on the guitar in "A Forest" "almost became a Smith trademark for a while". Simon Gallup said his playing on the track was intended to be reminiscent of the bass work in the music of The Stranglers, whose bassist Jean-Jacques Burnel was a major influence on him.

Smith has given varying explanations of his lyric for "A Forest." He has said the lyric was based upon a dream he had as a child where he was lost in the woods unable to escape, but later denied it and stated, "It's just about a forest."

== Release and promotion ==
"A Forest" was released as a single on 8 April 1980. Its B-side was "Another Journey by Train," an instrumental remake of The Cure's "Jumping Someone Else's Train." The single received a mixed critical reception, though commercially its sales were an improvement for the band. Entering the chart on 12 April, it spent eight weeks in the UK Singles Chart, peaking at No. 31 on 17 May. It was the highest they had placed on the chart by that point in their career. In the United States, the song reached No. 47 on the Billboard Dance Music/Club Play Singles chart.

The version included on 1986 compilation Standing on a Beach/Staring at the Sea is neither the album version (which was also on the 12" single) nor the 7" single edit (which removes a few bars between verses and fades out part-way through the guitar solo ending).

== Reception ==
"A Forest" is widely regarded as one of the Cure's best songs. In 2019, Billboard ranked the song number eight on their list of the 40 greatest Cure songs, and in 2023, Mojo ranked the song number one on their list of the 30 greatest Cure songs.

== Legacy ==
"A Forest" has become the song most performed by the Cure, with over 1,225 live appearances as of 2025. A live version of "A Forest" appeared on a four-song edition of The Hanging Garden released in July 1982. It was performed with a "rough, punk-edged" sound on the 1984 live album Concert: The Cure Live. A performance appears on the live video The Cure in Orange, highly regarded by AllMusic reviewer Ned Raggett, while other live versions of the song appear on the concert film Show, and on disc one of the live album Bestival Live 2011.

In 1990, the track was re-recorded (as the original master had been lost) and remixed by Mark Saunders for The Cure's Mixed Up album, which presented new remixes of classic Cure tracks. The "Tree mix" version of "A Forest" was released as a single on 6 December 1990, a few weeks after the album release on 20 November. The song was redone for the second time on the Join the Dots box set, this time remixed by Mark Plati and featuring Earl Slick on guitar. This version was described as "awful" and "instantly dated" by reviewer Chris Ott. An acoustic version was recorded and released on the bonus disc that came with some copies of the 2001 Greatest Hits CD. Robert Smith sang on a Blank & Jones cover version of the song, which appeared on their 2004 album Monument.

The song was covered by Norwegian black metal band Carpathian Forest as a re-issue bonus track from their album, Black Shining Leather.

The song was also covered by Polish blackened death metal band Behemoth in an eponymous EP released in 2020.

== Music video ==
The promotional video for "A Forest" was the first that featured the band visually. It was created by David Hiller, who mixed studio performance with a forest montage. Smith said the group "came across looking very morose and disinterested" in the video because that is how they felt at the time. He recalled he had been in pain at the time of the shoot as he had broken his thumb trying to change a tyre a few days previously. Smith's bandaged left thumb can be seen in the video.

== Track listing ==
7" – Fiction/Polydor (UK) (1980)

1. "A Forest" – 3:54
2. "Another Journey by Train" – 3:03

12" – Fiction/Polydor (UK) (1980)

1. "A Forest" – 5:55
2. "Another Journey by Train" – 3:00

CD/12" – Fiction (UK) (1990)

1. "A Forest" (Tree Mix) – 6:55
2. "A Forest" (Original) – 5:56
3. "In Between Days" (Shiver Mix) – 6:24

== Personnel ==
- Robert Smith – guitars, vocals
- Simon Gallup – bass
- Matthieu Hartley – synthesiser
- Lol Tolhurst – drums

== Charts ==
Weekly chart performance for "A Forest"
Chart (1980)	Peak position
Belgium Singles Chart	20
Netherlands (Dutch Top 40)	31
Netherlands (Single Top 100)	26
New Zealand Singles Chart	38
UK Singles Chart	31
US Billboard Dance Music/Club Play Singles	47

== Certifications ==
Certifications and sales for "A Forest"
Region	Certification	Certified units/sales
New Zealand (RMNZ)	Gold	15,000^{‡}
United Kingdom (BPI)	Silver	200,000^{‡}
^{‡} Sales+streaming figures based on certification alone.
