= Bloodflowers =

2000 studio album by the Cure

Studio album by the Cure
- Released: 2 February 2000
- Studio: St Catherine's Court (Bath, England); RAK (London)
- Genre: Gothic rock; indie rock; folk rock
- Length: 64:29
- Label: Fiction; Polydor
- Producer: Robert Smith; Paul Corkett

The Cure chronology
Galore (1997)	Bloodflowers (2000)	Greatest Hits (2001)

Bloodflowers is the eleventh studio album by the English rock band the Cure. It was first released in Japan on 2 February 2000, before being released in the UK and Europe on 14 February 2000 and then the day after in the US by Fiction Records and Polydor Records. Initially the album was to be released in 1999, as it had been completed by May that year, but the record company wanted it to be released "post millennial fever".

Singer and frontman Robert Smith chose to not release any singles from the album, against the will of the record company, which Smith has said was an act of "revenge" due to his dissatisfaction towards the lack of promotion the band's previously released compilation Galore (1997) received from the record company due to conflicts of interests. However, "Maybe Someday" and "Out of This World" were issued as promotional singles to radio in the UK, US, Canada and numerous territories in Europe.

== Background ==
According to Robert Smith, "Bloodflowers was the best experience I've had since doing the Kiss Me album. I achieved my goals, which were to make an album, enjoy making it, and end up with something that has real intense, emotional content. And I didn't kill myself in the process." He also said that "at the demo stage" they had more commercial songs in mind for the album but "they just sounded so shallow".

Smith also took more control of the album's sound, directing the band to produce a certain sound and mood for the album. The only song that had direct input from another member was "The Last Day of Summer", which was composed by bassist Simon Gallup. This led to more strict recording sessions than their previous album Wild Mood Swings (1996), due to Smith dominating the creative decisions on the albums. "I saw them both (Simon and Roger) looking at each other murmuring 'Oh shit, this thing is happening again...' but I think the result justifies this. Therefore we had a lot of stress in the band and in the end I stood there alone. All the others were gone because they got the feeling I wouldn't listen to them. So I had to record the vocals alone. As they came back and listened to it they thought it was fantastic."

Smith also had a shorter running time in mind, due to Wild Mood Swings having a run time of over an hour, saying, "I find that seventy minutes of one artist is, almost without exception, too much." However, he struggled to reach his planned run time of 45 minutes due to his satisfaction with the sound of the songs.

"I edited the first track, 'Out of This World', down from 6:30 to 4:45, but I was told that the introduction was still too long for radio. But I like that slow development, and I didn't want to impose the three-and-a-half-minute structure on anything I was writing, because it just felt stupid.”

Smith realised "in hindsight, that it's the songs themselves that probably need trimming back, but I think that they benefit from their length. I've done an edit of 'Watching Me Fall' at home, and I got it down to under six minutes [from eleven minutes, thirteen seconds], but it’s just not the same song."

The only song that was not initially written for the album was "There Is No If...", which was written when Smith was 19. It never made it onto an album due to Smith's initial reluctance to use the song, calling it "hippy-like", although he felt that the rendition that he recorded for Bloodflowers suited the feel of the album.

== Release and promotion ==
No commercial singles were released from Bloodflowers, but two promotional singles were released to DJs and radio stations: "Out of This World", in January (Europe) and May (US), and "Maybe Someday", in January (US) and April (Europe). "Maybe Someday" managed to peak at No. 10 on the Alternative Airplay chart. Bloodflowers was a moderate success, debuting at number 16 on the US Billboard 200. It was nominated for a Grammy Award for Best Alternative Music Album in 2001. In subsequent years, Smith identified it as his favourite Cure album in a 2004 Rolling Stone interview.

The second track on the album, "Watching Me Fall" was featured in the end credits of the 2000 horror film American Psycho.

== Reception ==
Professional ratings
Aggregate scores
Source	Rating
Metacritic	69/100
Review scores
Source	Rating
AllMusic	3/5 stars
Entertainment Weekly	A−
The Guardian	4/5 stars
Los Angeles Times	2.5/4 stars
Melody Maker	1.5/5 stars
NME	7/10
Pitchfork	7.5/10
Q	3/5 stars
Rolling Stone	2.5/5 stars
Uncut	3/5 stars

Bloodflowers received mixed reviews from critics. Entertainment Weekly called it "one of the band's most affecting works". Pitchfork gave a positive review of the album scoring it a 7.5/10, praising the album's sound and concluded, "Bloodflowers contains some classic Cure material, which is more than can be said of their catalog since Disintegration."

Melody Maker titled their review "Goth-Awful!", rating the album 1.5 out of 5. Rolling Stone criticized the quality of the compositions, saying, "[Smith] can write four bad songs in a row, and Cure albums tend to leak filler like an attic spilling insulation" and concluded, "Bloodflowers, is half dismissible droning, an unforgivable ratio considering it's only nine tracks long." Similarly, Trouser Press stated in their review: "The album sounds completely uninspired, as Smith and company go through the motions of Cure-ness."

Les Inrockuptibles wrote that the album featured "endless songs" with "dated sounds". AllMusic noted that although Bloodflowers contained all the Cure's musical trademarks, "morose lyrics, keening vocals, long running times", "the album falls short of the mark, largely because it sounds too self-conscious".

== Track listing ==
All tracks are written by Robert Smith.

No.	Title	Length
1.	"Out of This World"	6:44
2.	"Watching Me Fall"	11:13
3.	"Where the Birds Always Sing"	5:44
4.	"Maybe Someday"	5:04
5.	"Coming Up" (only on vinyl and Australian, Japanese, Colombian CD editions)	6:27
6.	"The Last Day of Summer"	5:36
7.	"There Is No If..."	3:44
8.	"The Loudest Sound"	5:09
9.	"39"	7:20
10.	"Bloodflowers"	7:31

Bonus track only available through the Internet
No.	Title	Length
11.	"Spilt Milk"	4:53

== Personnel ==
The Cure

- Robert Smith – vocals, guitar, 6-string bass guitar, keyboard
- Simon Gallup – bass guitar
- Perry Bamonte – guitar, 6-string bass guitar
- Jason Cooper – drums, percussion
- Roger O'Donnell – keyboards

Production

- Robert Smith – production, mixing
- Paul Corkett – production, engineer, mixing
- Sacha Jankovich – engineer
- Ian Cooper – mastering
- Daryl Bamonte – project coordinator
- Perry Bamonte – photography
- Paul Cox – photography
- Alex Smith – photography
- Alexis Yraola – logo

== Charts ==
2000 chart performance for Bloodflowers
Chart (2000)	Peak position
Australian Albums (ARIA)	11
Austrian Albums (Ö3 Austria)	22
Belgian Albums (Ultratop Flanders)	11
Belgian Albums (Ultratop Wallonia)	9
Canadian Albums (Billboard)	15
Czech Albums (ČNS IFPI)	7
Danish Albums (Hitlisten)	2
Dutch Albums (Album Top 100)	50
European Albums (Music & Media)	2
Finnish Albums (Suomen virallinen lista)	15
French Albums (SNEP)	3
German Albums (Offizielle Top 100)	5
Greek Albums (IFPI)	8
Irish Albums (IRMA)	32
Italian Albums (FIMI)	8
New Zealand Albums (RMNZ)	41
Norwegian Albums (VG-lista)	5
Scottish Albums (OCC)	52
Spanish Albums (AFYVE)	18
Swedish Albums (Sverigetopplistan)	5
Swiss Albums (Schweizer Hitparade)	3
UK Albums (OCC)	14
US Billboard 200	16

2020 chart performance for Bloodflowers
Chart (2020)	Peak position
Portuguese Albums (AFP)	42
US Top Alternative Albums (Billboard)	20
US Top Rock Albums (Billboard)	31
US Indie Store Album Sales (Billboard)	9

== Certifications and sales ==
Certifications and sales for Bloodflowers
Region	Certification	Certified units/sales
Switzerland (IFPI Switzerland)	Gold	25,000^{^}
United States	—	285,000
^{^} Shipments figures based on certification alone.
