= Japanese Whispers =

Compilation album by The Cure
- Released: 16 December 1983
- Recorded: November 1982 – April 1983
- Genres: New wave; gothic rock; pop; post-punk
- Length: 28:27
- Labels: Fiction (UK); Sire (US)
- Producers: Chris Parry; Steve Nye; Robert Smith; Phil Thornalley

The Cure chronology
Pornography (1982)	Japanese Whispers (1983)	The Top (1984)

Professional ratings
Review scores
Source	Rating
AllMusic	3/5 stars
The Rolling Stone Album Guide	4/5 stars

Japanese Whispers is the second compilation album by the English group The Cure. It was released in late 1983 by Fiction Records. The title is a play on the children's game Chinese whispers.

It includes the singles "Let's Go to Bed", "The Walk" and "The Love Cats". The other tracks are the B-sides of these singles, although "Mr. Pink Eyes" (the second B-side for "The Love Cats") was not included. The songs were recorded when the band was in a transitional phase after bassist Simon Gallup left following a tour to promote the previous album, Pornography. Beginning with these singles, Lol Tolhurst switched from drums to keyboards, a role he kept until his departure in 1989.

For the tracks from the "Let's Go to Bed" and "The Walk" singles, the Cure were a duo consisting of Tolhurst and Robert Smith, with the addition of session drummer Steve Goulding (a member of Graham Parker and the Rumour) for the tracks from "Let's Go to Bed". For "The Love Cats" single, a full band was assembled with the addition of bassist/producer Phil Thornalley, who had worked with the band on Pornography, and drummer Andy Anderson, a lineup which would continue for the Concert live album.

In 1986, the singles' lead tracks were included on the Standing on a Beach compilation album, while all of the B-sides were included on the 2004 B-sides and rarities box set Join the Dots.

Japanese Whispers was the first Cure album to enter the Billboard 200 in the US, in early 1984.

== Track listing ==
All tracks written by Robert Smith and Laurence Tolhurst except as noted.

1. "Let's Go to Bed" – 3:34
2. "The Dream" (Smith) – 3:13
3. "Just One Kiss" – 4:09
4. "The Upstairs Room" – 3:31
5. "The Walk" – 3:30
6. "Speak My Language" – 2:41
7. "Lament" (Smith) – 4:20
8. "The Love Cats" (Smith) – 3:40

== Personnel ==
- Robert Smith – vocals, guitars, keyboards, bass guitar
- Lol Tolhurst – keyboards, drum machine, vibraphone (6, 8)
- Steve Goulding – drums (1, 3)
- Phil Thornalley – double bass (6, 8)
- Andy Anderson – drums (6, 8)

== Charts ==
Chart performance for Japanese Whispers
Chart (1984)	Peak position
Australian Albums (Kent Music Report)	18
German Albums (Offizielle Top 100)	46
New Zealand Albums (RMNZ)	8
UK Albums (Official Charts)	26
US Billboard 200	181

== Certifications ==
Certifications for Japanese Whispers
Region	Certification	Certified units/sales
United Kingdom (BPI)	Silver	60,000^{^}
^{^} Shipments figures based on certification alone.
