= Boris Williams =

French/English drummer (born 1951)

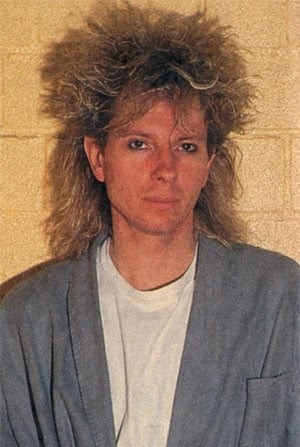
- Williams in the mid-1980s while a member of The Cure

Background information
- Born: Boris Peter Bransby Williams; 24 April 1951 (age 75); Versailles, France
- Genres: Punk rock; post punk; gothic rock; alternative rock; pop
- Occupation: Musician
- Instruments: Drums; percussion
- Formerly of: The Cure, Thompson Twins, Strawberry Switchblade, Shelleyan Orphan, Babacar
- Website: thecure.com

Boris Peter Bransby Williams (born 24 April 1951) is an English musician, best known as the drummer for The Cure from 1984 until 1994, and for forming the band Babacar in the late 1990s.

== Biography ==
Williams was born in 1951 (some sources mistakenly say 1957) in Versailles, France to English parents and his family moved to Farnham, England during his childhood. He learned drums with his mother's knitting needles and never had formal instruction. He first played drums in local bands with future Cure bandmate Roger O'Donnell and originally focused on jazz fusion. He then turned to alternative rock and served as a session and touring musician for Thompson Twins and Kim Wilde.

In 1984, The Cure needed a new drummer in the middle of an American tour, when previous drummer Andy Anderson was suddenly fired. Williams was recommended for the position by the Cure's then-bassist/producer Phil Thornalley, who had worked with Williams while engineering the Thompson Twins album Quick Step & Side Kick. Williams learned the Cure's set list in three days, and his first performance with the band was in November 1984. He was then invited to be the band's permanent drummer, and his first album as a full-time member was The Head on the Door in 1985.

Williams was present during the Cure's most successful period and is often cited by fans as the best drummer in the band's history. Known for experimenting with electronic percussion and loops, Williams was a primary contributor to the band's remix album Mixed Up in 1990. He was also known for his innovative drumming style, with Freaky Trigger saying: "[He] is a god among drummers due to his complete willingness to create an entire beat based on doing rolls on the various toms in his kit." Williams has been cited by Billboard for his subtle but forceful drumming, "improbably stealing the show from his bandmates"; and critics often praise his technical and timekeeping skills.

Williams is also credited with contributions to albums by Shelleyan Orphan, featuring his longtime partner Caroline Crawley. He left the Cure for personal reasons in 1994. Later in that decade, he formed the band Babacar with Crawley and various other associates of The Cure; his former Cure bandmate Porl Thompson made occasional contributions to the band. Babacar released a self-titled album in 1998. Williams contributed to new acoustic versions of Cure songs that were recorded for their Greatest Hits compilation in 2001, though he did not officially rejoin the band. In 2019, he was inducted into the Rock and Roll Hall of Fame as a member of the Cure.

== Discography ==
The Cure

- The Head on the Door (1985)
- The Cure in Orange (1986), VHS
- Standing on a Beach (1986)
- Kiss Me, Kiss Me, Kiss Me (1987)
- Disintegration (1989)
- Mixed Up (1990)
- Entreat (1991)
- Wish (1992)
- Paris (1993)
- Show (1993)
- Galore (1997)
- Greatest Hits (2001)

Thompson Twins

- Quick Step & Side Kick (1983)

Strawberry Switchblade

- Strawberry Switchblade (1985)

Robbie Nevil

- Robbie Nevil (1986)

Ian McCulloch

- Candleland (1989)

Shelleyan Orphan

- Humroot (1992)
- We Have Everything We Need (2008)

Babacar

- Babacar (1998)
