= Close to Me (The Cure song) =

1985 single by the Cure

Single by the Cure

from the album The Head on the Door
- B-side: "A Man Inside My Mouth"; "Stop Dead"
- Released: 13 September 1985
- Studio: Angel Recording Studios, London
- Genre: Folk-pop
- Length: 3:38
- Label: Fiction
- Songwriter: Robert Smith
- Producers: Robert Smith; Dave Allen

The Cure singles chronology
"In Between Days" (1985)	"Close to Me" (1985)	"Boys Don't Cry (New Voice • New Mix)" (1986)

Music video
- "Close To Me" on YouTube

"Close to Me" is a song by English rock band the Cure, released in September 1985 as the second and final single from their sixth album, The Head on the Door.

== Content ==
Three versions of "Close to Me" were released in 1985, including the original album version, the 7-inch single mix version and the 12-inch extended mix version. The two mixes include a brass section not heard on the album.

== Music video ==
The music video is written and directed by the band's frequent music video director Tim Pope. It consists of the band all inside a wardrobe on the edge of a cliff at Beachy Head.

Following the musical scheme of the song, which builds up instrumentally, all the band members are inside the wardrobe, but not playing instruments. Boris Williams is clapping to the beat, keyboardist Lol Tolhurst is playing a very small, handheld keyboard, and Porl Thompson on the top shelf is plucking a comb to represent the short high-pitched guitar notes. Bassist Simon Gallup does not play, and instead appears to be tied up. Tim Pope later revealed that Gallup had a light bulb in his mouth to create a "lit from within" feel, and the cloth was there to hide the wire.

Robert Smith then comes from the back of the wardrobe and sings, also playing with finger puppets, which appear to be voodoo dolls of the band members, as when he moves them, the corresponding member moves. He then becomes more violent with the dolls, shaking them around heavily, which in turn causes the band members to hit into the sides of the wardrobe, which eventually results in the wardrobe falling off the cliff and into the sea. As they go into the sea, the wardrobe fills up slowly with water, like a capsized ship, but the band members continue to play their "instruments." The video ends with the wardrobe full of water and a band member pushing a rubber duck across the screen.

The music video was rated 13th on the 20 to One TV show, aired on Australia's Nine Network on 4 March 2007, which rated the most distinctive music videos.

Robert Smith said of making the video: "It was the most uncomfortable 12 hours that I've ever spent. He [Tim Pope] ended up dropping the wardrobe – with us still in it – into a huge tank filled with 1000 gallons of water. Watching it you'd think it was fun, but all I could think about was dying a slow, painful death".

== Release ==
"Close to Me" was released on 13 September 1985 as the second single from the band's sixth album, The Head on the Door. The single peaked at number seven in Australia and number 24 in the UK singles chart. It was remixed in 1990 for their remix album Mixed Up, and the remix was released as a single, peaking at number 13 on the UK singles chart and number 97 on the Billboard Hot 100 chart in the US in January 1991.

== Track listings ==
7-inch single

1. "Close to Me" (remix) – 3:38
2. "A Man Inside My Mouth" – 3:07

10-inch single

1. "Close to Me" (remix) – 3:38
2. "A Man Inside My Mouth" – 3:07
3. "New Day" – 4:08
4. "Stop Dead" – 3:21

12-inch single

1. "Close to Me" (extended remix) – 6:35
2. "A Man Inside My Mouth" – 3:07
3. "Stop Dead" – 3:21

== Personnel ==
- Robert Smith – vocals
- Lol Tolhurst – keyboards
- Porl Thompson – keyboards
- Simon Gallup – bass guitar
- Boris Williams – drums
- Rent Party – horns

== Charts ==
=== Weekly charts ===
Chart (1985–1986)	Peak position
Australia (Kent Music Report)	7
Belgium (Ultratop 50 Flanders)	30
France (SNEP)	17
Ireland (IRMA)	19
Netherlands (Dutch Top 40)	21
Netherlands (Single Top 100)	16
New Zealand (Recorded Music NZ)	45
UK (Official Charts Company)	24
US Dance Club Songs (Billboard)	32
West Germany (GfK)	49

=== Year-end charts ===
Chart (1986)	Position
Australia (Kent Music Report)	56

== Certifications ==
Region	Certification	Certified units/sales
Italy (FIMI) sales since 2009	Gold	25,000^{‡}
New Zealand (RMNZ)	Platinum	30,000^{‡}
Spain (Promusicae)	Gold	30,000^{‡}
United Kingdom (BPI) sales since 2004	Platinum	600,000^{‡}
^{‡} Sales+streaming figures based on certification alone.

== Close to Me · Remix ==
"Close to Me · Remix"

Single by the Cure

from the album Mixed Up
- B-side: "Just Like Heaven" (Dizzy mix)
- Released: 22 October 1990
- Genre: Dance-pop
- Length: 4:28
- Label: Fiction
- Songwriter: Robert Smith
- Producers: Robert Smith; Chris Parry; Mark Saunders

The Cure singles chronology
"Never Enough" (1990)	"Close to Me · Remix" (1990)	"High" (1992)

Music video
- "Close To Me (Remix)" on YouTube

"Close to Me · Remix" is the name given to the remixed version of the song, released as a single on 22 October 1990 to promote the album Mixed Up. It was made available in two different versions, the "Closer Mix", included on the 12-inch and the limited edition CD single, and the "Closest Mix", included on the 7-inch and the regular edition CD single. Both versions were available together on the cassette release. The "Closest Mix" was also included on the singles compilation Galore in 1997. It reached number 13 in the UK and number four in Ireland. Both the "Closer Mix" and the "Closest Mix" were remixed by Paul Oakenfold and Steve Osborne for the 1990 album Mixed Up. The "Closest Mix" is the edited version of the "Closer Mix".

=== Music video ===
There is also a music video for the version of the song that appeared on Mixed Up. The video picked up where the original video ended, with the wardrobe crashing down the cliffside and sinking to the bottom of the sea. Robert exits first and is attacked by an octopus (seen playing the horns later in the video). After his struggle, the other band members try to flee as well, and are attacked by a starfish. The video ends without any of the band members reaching the surface, though they could see a boat overhead.

=== Track listings ===
7-inch

1. "Close to Me" (Closest mix)
2. "Just Like Heaven" (Dizzy mix)

12-inch and CD

1. "Close to Me" (Closer mix)
2. "Just Like Heaven" (Dizzy mix)
3. "Primary" (Red mix)

Cassette single

1. "Close to Me" (Closer mix)
2. "Just Like Heaven" (Dizzy mix)
3. "Close to Me" (Closest mix)
4. "Primary" (Red mix)

=== Charts ===
Chart (1990–1991)	Peak position
Australia (ARIA)	55
Europe (Eurochart Hot 100)	47
Ireland (IRMA)	4
Luxembourg (Radio Luxembourg)	10
New Zealand (Recorded Music NZ)	27
Portugal (AFP)	8
Spain (AFYVE)	18
UK Singles (Official Charts)	13
US Billboard Hot 100	97
US Dance Singles Sales (Billboard)	44
US Cash Box Top 100	64

=== Release history ===
Region	Date	Format(s)	Label(s)	Ref.
United Kingdom	22 October 1990	—N/a	Fiction	
Australia	14 January 1991	7-inch vinyl; 12-inch vinyl; cassette	Fiction	
