= In Between Days =

1985 song by The Cure

Single by the Cure

from the album The Head on the Door
- B-side: "The Exploding Boy"; "A Few Hours After This..."
- Released: 19 July 1985
- Recorded: 1985
- Studio: Angel Recording Studios, London
- Genre: Alternative rock; jangle pop
- Length: 2:57
- Label: Fiction
- Songwriter: Robert Smith
- Producers: Robert Smith; Dave Allen

The Cure singles chronology
"The Caterpillar" (1984)	"In Between Days" (1985)	"Close to Me" (1985)

Music video
- "In Between Days" on YouTube

"In Between Days" (sometimes listed as "Inbetween Days" or "In-Between Days") is a song by the English rock band the Cure, released on 19 July 1985 as the first single from the band's sixth album The Head on the Door.

The song was an international success. In the UK, it was the band's ninth chart single and their fourth consecutive Top 20 hit; while in the US it was their first single to reach the Billboard Hot 100, where it peaked at number 99. It was a Top 20 hit in Australia and New Zealand and also charted in several European countries, increasing the popularity of the band.

== Music video ==
The video was filmed on 18 June 1985 at Fulham Studios, London and created by Tim Pope. The video depicts the band playing, enhanced by 360-degree shots and drawn-in, colourful socks. Robert Smith had a camera, held by cables, which he could push away and hold at will; as did Porl Thompson, fixed on his guitar.

Tim Pope said of the video "I think Robert is a true English eccentric, you see. He's an absolute nutcase; he's absolutely mad. Therefore, the films are very easy because I just do a close-up of his face and let him go a bit mad." Smith has stated that it was one of his favourite Cure videos, feeling "it captures the song", saying "We wanted to make a video that portrayed us as we are, without looking glamorous or anything, because I got very fed up with seeing people strutting and preening in videos. I think it’s the most tedious thing in the world, seeing the same people with different faces."

== Reception ==
"In Between Days" is widely regarded as one of the Cure's best songs. It was ranked number 65 in Sounds list of top 100 singles of all time. In 2019, Billboard ranked the song number 3 on their list of the 40 greatest Cure songs, and in 2023, Mojo ranked the song number 2 on their list of the 30 greatest Cure songs.

John Leland at Spin said, "It has the bittersweet feel of a New Order record, with a hyperstrummed acoustic guitar for depth. The boys even offer a genuine glimmer of hope, and the tune fairly breezes by on its own momentum."

== Track listing ==
UK 7" single

1. "In Between Days"
2. "The Exploding Boy"

UK 12" single

1. "In Between Days"
2. "The Exploding Boy"
3. "A Few Hours After This"

U.S. 7" single

1. "In Between Days"
2. "Stop Dead"

U.S./Canadian 12" single

1. "In Between Days"
2. "In Between Days" (Extended version)
3. "Stop Dead"

UK CD

1. "In Between Days" (2:55)
2. "The Exploding Boy" (2:52)
3. "A Few Hours After This" (2:25)
4. "Six Different Ways (Live)" (3:24)
5. "Push (Live)" (4:33)
6. "In Between Days" (2:55) (video)

== Personnel ==
- Robert Smith – vocals, guitar, six-string bass
- Porl Thompson – keyboards
- Simon Gallup – bass
- Boris Williams – drums
- Lol Tolhurst – keyboards

== Charts ==
Chart (1985)	Peak position
Australia (Kent Music Report)	16
Netherlands (Dutch Top 40)	31
Netherlands (Single Top 100)	26
UK Singles Chart	15
U.S. Billboard Hot 100	99
U.S. Billboard Hot Dance Club Play	39

== Certifications ==
Region	Certification	Certified units/sales
New Zealand (RMNZ)	Gold	15,000^{‡}
United Kingdom (BPI)	Platinum	600,000^{‡}
^{‡} Sales+streaming figures based on certification alone.

== Cover versions ==
=== Studio versions ===
Year	Artist	Album
2005	Korn	Unplugged
2008	Blackblack	Perfect as Cats

=== Other versions ===
- The song was covered by Superchunk for the first season of The A.V. Club's A.V. Undercover web series.
