= The Head on the Door =

Studio album by the Cure
- Released: 30 August 1985
- Recorded: 1985
- Studios: Angel Recording, London
- Genres: Alternative rock; post-punk; art pop; new wave
- Length: 37:46
- Label: Fiction
- Producers: Robert Smith; David M. Allen

The Cure chronology
Concert: The Cure Live (1984)	The Head on the Door (1985)	Standing on a Beach (1986)

Singles from The Head on the Door
- 1. "In Between Days" Released: 19 July 1985; 2. "Close to Me" Released: 13 September 1985

The Head on the Door is the sixth studio album by the English rock band the Cure. It was released on 30 August 1985 by Fiction Records. Preceded by the single "In Between Days" which had reached No. 15 on the UK Singles Chart, The Head on the Door was described by Melody Maker as "a collection of pop songs". With its variety of styles, it allowed the group to reach a wider audience in both Europe and North America. In the United Kingdom it became their most successful album to date, entering the albums chart at No. 7 on 7 September.

The album is the first to feature drummer Boris Williams, while bassist Simon Gallup and guitarist Porl Thompson both returned to the band after several years' absence. The Head on the Door is the first Cure album where all the songs were composed solely by singer and guitarist Robert Smith. It is also the first Cure album to spawn multiple singles. (Note: Three Imaginary Boys spawned two singles, however, one was in France and the other was in the UK. With this album, both singles were released worldwide.)

== History and music ==
This album marks the return of Simon Gallup in the group; he had performed and composed with Robert Smith and Lol Tolhurst on the dark trilogy Seventeen Seconds, Faith and Pornography. Guitarist Porl Thompson, who had played guitar during the very early days of the band, and also played keyboards and saxophone during The Top tour, became an official member. Drummer Boris Williams, who had previously worked with Thompson Twins, finally joined the ensemble after playing with the band during the US leg of the 1984 tour.

During promotion for the record, Smith stated that The Head on the Door was inspired by the albums Kaleidoscope by Siouxsie and the Banshees and Dare by the Human League. He wanted the album to be eclectic with different styles and moods: "It reminds me of the Kaleidoscope album, the idea of having lots of different sounding things, different colours". "Kyoto Song" contains an oriental hook, while "The Blood" is played in a flamenco style. The piano tune of "Six Different Ways" had been previously used by Smith during his tenure with Siouxsie and the Banshees, for the single "Swimming Horses". The last song of the album, "Sinking", was reminiscent of the band's Faith era, while "Close to Me" (released as the album's second and final single) was described as a "disco thing" by critics. The opening track and first single, "In Between Days", was compared to New Order's material. "A Night Like This" contains a saxophone solo by Ron Howe from Fools Dance. The title of the album comes from a line in the chorus of "Close to Me".

When he was interviewed that year, Smith said that his five favourite albums were at that time Mirror Moves by the Psychedelic Furs, This Year's Model by Elvis Costello, Low by David Bowie, Kaleidoscope by Siouxsie and the Banshees and Rattus Norvegicus by the Stranglers.

== Release, reception and legacy ==
Professional ratings
Review scores
Source	Rating
AllMusic	4.5/5 stars
Blender	4/5 stars
Christgau's Record Guide	B
Mojo	4/5 stars
Pitchfork	8.7/10
Q	4/5 stars
Record Mirror	4/5
The Rolling Stone Album Guide	4/5 stars
Sounds	4/5 stars
Spin	4/5 stars

Released on 30 August 1985 in the UK and on 4 September in the US, The Head on the Door was the first big international success for the band, notably entering the top 75 in the US and reaching the top 20 in numerous other countries. The album is certified gold in the US, UK and France.

Upon its release, The Head on the Door was well received by the British press. In a very favourable review, Melody Maker's Steve Sutherland hailed the "liberty" that Smith took to conceive a multifaceted record. Chris Roberts of Sounds said that it "makes you wish more pop stars were hip enough to stay in bed all day". Record Mirror reviewer Andy Strickland wrote that The Head on the Door "may lack the swirls of chorused guitar that many adore, but there's a wider more mature musical approach". Mat Snow of NME found that the album "is really quite pop", and that "tunes abound". In December 1985 it was named the best album of the year by Melody Maker.

In 2000 it was voted number 833 in Colin Larkin's All Time Top 1000 Albums.

In a retrospective review, AllMusic critic Tim Sendra noted that The Head on the Door marked a new musical direction for the Cure in that Smith had managed to make the band's trademark "gloom and doom" style both "danceable and popular"; Sendra also found that the album's "inventive" arrangements provide "a musical depth previous efforts lacked". Writing for Q, Tom Doyle said that songs such as "In Between Days" and "Close to Me" showed Smith "bridging the brooding of yore with their recent pop highs". Nitsuh Abebe of Pitchfork deemed it the band's "most focused pop album" and "a tight, terrific package". PopMatters included The Head on the Door on its list of 12 essential alternative rock albums from the 1980s, calling the record "an outstanding example of Smith's ability to use pop music as a means to express angst while applying just a hint of the polish".

== Track listing ==
All tracks are written by Robert Smith.

Side one
No.	Title	Length
1.	"In Between Days"	2:57
2.	"Kyoto Song"	4:16
3.	"The Blood"	3:43
4.	"Six Different Ways"	3:18
5.	"Push"	4:31

Side two
No.	Title	Length
1.	"The Baby Screams"	3:44
2.	"Close to Me"	3:23
3.	"A Night Like This"	4:16
4.	"Screw"	2:38
5.	"Sinking"	4:57

2006 deluxe edition bonus disc
No.	Title	Length
1.	"In Between Days" (RS Instrumental Home Demo 12/84)	1:25
2.	"Inwood" (RS Instrumental Home Demo 12/84)	2:18
3.	"Push" (RS Instrumental Home Demo 12/84)	2:31
4.	"Innsbruck" (RS Instrumental Home Demo 12/84)	2:37
5.	"Stop Dead" (Fitz/F2 Studios Demo 2/85)	3:21
6.	"Mansolidgone" (Fitz/F2 Studios Demo 2/85)	4:06
7.	"Screw" (Fitz/F2 Studios Demo 2/85)	3:09
8.	"Lime Time" (Fitz/F2 Studios Demo 2/85)	2:56
9.	"Kyoto Song" (Fitz/F2 Studios Demo 2/85)	4:28
10.	"A Few Hours After This ..." (Fitz/F2 Studios Demo 2/85)	4:36
11.	"Six Different Ways" (Fitz/F2 Studios Demo 2/85)	3:00
12.	"A Man Inside My Mouth" (Fitz/F2 Studios Demo 2/85)	3:00
13.	"A Night Like This" (Fitz/F2 Studios Demo 2/85)	4:08
14.	"The Exploding Boy" (Fitz/F2 Studios Demo 2/85)	3:06
15.	"Close to Me" (Fitz/F2 Studios Demo 2/85)	4:03
16.	"The Baby Screams" (live bootleg Bercy Paris 12/85 – bootleg audience recording)	3:46
17.	"The Blood" (live bootleg Bercy Paris 12/85 – bootleg audience recording)	3:34
18.	"Sinking" (live bootleg Bercy Paris 12/85 – bootleg audience recording)	5:06

== Personnel ==
- Robert Smith – vocals, guitars, keyboards, production
- Lol Tolhurst – keyboards
- Porl Thompson – guitars, keyboards
- Simon Gallup – bass guitar
- Boris Williams – drums, percussion
- Ron Howe – saxophone on "A Night Like This"
- David M. Allen – production
- Howard Gray – production on "Kyoto Song", "Push" and "A Night Like This"
- Frank Barretta – engineer

== Charts ==
=== Weekly charts ===
1985–1986 weekly chart performance for The Head on the Door
Chart (1985–1986)	Peak position
Australian Albums (Kent Music Report)	6
Dutch Albums (Album Top 100)	3
European Albums (Eurotipsheet)	7
German Albums (Offizielle Top 100)	15
Italian Albums (Musica e dischi)	18
New Zealand Albums (RMNZ)	11
Swedish Albums (Sverigetopplistan)	24
Swiss Albums (Schweizer Hitparade)	14
UK Albums (Official Charts)	7
US Billboard 200	59

2006 weekly chart performance for The Head on the Door
Chart (2006)	Peak position
Italian Albums (FIMI)	96

2023–2025 weekly chart performance for The Head on the Door
Chart (2023–2025)	Peak position
Belgian Albums (Ultratop Flanders)	99
Belgian Albums (Ultratop Wallonia)	189
Croatian International Albums (HDU)	36

=== Year-end charts ===
1985 year-end chart performance for The Head on the Door
Chart (1985)	Position
Australian Albums (Kent Music Report)	65
Dutch Albums (Album Top 100)	49

1986 year-end chart performance for The Head on the Door
Chart (1986)	Position
Australian Albums (Kent Music Report)	43
European Albums (Music & Media)	71

== Certifications ==
Certifications for The Head on the Door
Region	Certification	Certified units/sales
France (SNEP)	Gold	100,000^{*}
New Zealand (RMNZ)	Gold	7,500^{‡}
United Kingdom (BPI)	Gold	100,000^{^}
United States (RIAA)	Gold	500,000^{^}
^{*} Sales figures based on certification alone.^{^} Shipments figures based on certification alone.^{‡} Sales+streaming figures based on certification alone.
