= The Caterpillar (song) =

Single by The Cure

from the album The Top
- B-side: "Happy the Man" "Throw Your Foot"
- Released: 26 March 1984
- Genre: Psychedelic rock; pop
- Length: 3:40
- Label: Fiction
- Songwriters: Robert Smith; Lol Tolhurst
- Producers: Robert Smith; Chris Parry; Dave Allen

The Cure singles chronology
"The Love Cats" (1983)	"The Caterpillar" (1984)	"In Between Days" (1985)

"The Caterpillar" is a song by English rock band The Cure, released as the sole single from their fifth studio album The Top (1984), on 30 March 1984. It was written by Robert Smith and Lol Tolhurst. It spent seven weeks in the UK Singles Chart, peaking at number 14 on 7 April of that year. It spent five weeks on the Dutch charts in June 1984, reaching number 35 there on 2 June. It reached number 51 on the Australian Kent Music Report chart.

== Reception ==
In a retrospective review for AllMusic, Ned Raggett wrote that "it's the Cure in freely pop mode, uncaring of what it's supposed to really sound like."

== Music video ==
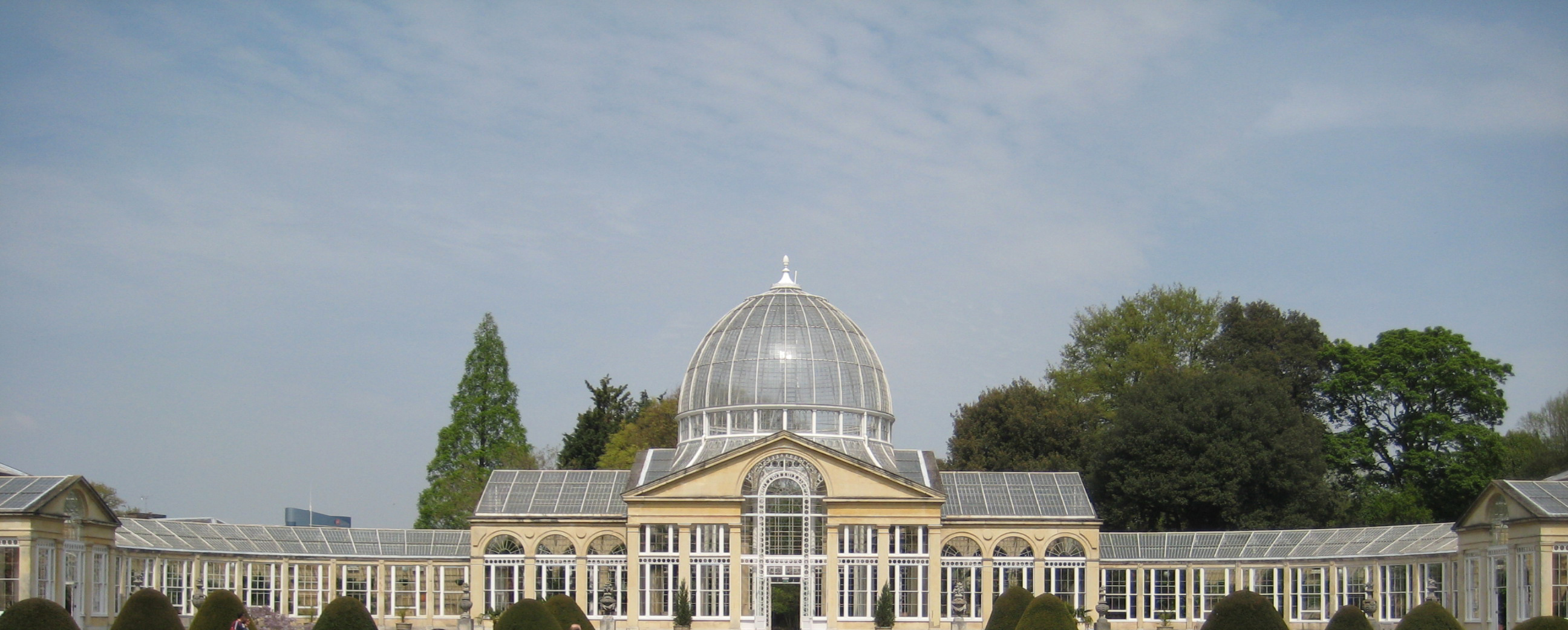
The music video was shot in the Great Conservatory, Syon Park.

As with many other singles, the song's music video was directed by Tim Pope. It was shot in the Great Conservatory in Syon Park, London. Phil Thornalley and Porl Thompson appear in the music video, but do not contribute to the song.

== Track listing ==
7"

1. "The Caterpillar" (3:40)
2. "Happy the Man" (2:45)

12"

1. "The Caterpillar" (3:40)
2. "Happy the Man" (2:45)
3. "Throw Your Foot" (3:32)

== Personnel ==
- Robert Smith – vocals, guitar, bass, violin
- Andy Anderson – percussion
- Lol Tolhurst – keyboards
