= The Walk (The Cure song) =

Single by the Cure
- B-side: "The Dream"; "The Upstairs Room"; "Lament"
- Released: June 1983
- Genre: Synth-pop; Eurodisco
- Length: 3:33
- Label: Fiction
- Songwriters: Robert Smith; Lol Tolhurst
- Producer: Steve Nye

The Cure singles chronology
"Let's Go to Bed" (1982)	"The Walk" (1983)	"The Love Cats" (1983)

Music video
- "The Walk" on YouTube

"The Walk" is a song by the English rock band the Cure, released as a stand-alone single in June 1983. It later appeared on their second compilation album Japanese Whispers. It was recorded when the band was briefly reduced to the two founder members Robert Smith and Lol Tolhurst upon the departure of bassist Simon Gallup in mid-1982, following the end of the band's tour in support of their fourth studio album, Pornography (1982). According to Tolhurst, they chose Steve Nye as producer at the time due to his work on the fifth and final studio album Tin Drum (1981) by the English new wave band Japan. Tolhurst later commented: "It was the first time we had worked with a 'proper' producer, as opposed to doing production with an engineer that we really liked. […] He was able to make electronic instruments sound more natural, and that's what we wanted."

== Content ==
One of the three B-sides of the single is "Lament", which is a re-recording of a promo single released in late 1982 for the Flexipop magazine. Unlike the earlier version which had been recorded with Siouxsie and the Banshees bassist Steven Severin, which was garbled and experimental, the lyrics are understandable and the music has a different composition.

== Release ==
Released as a single in June 1983, "The Walk" was something of a commercial breakthrough for the group with regard to their singles output, peaking at number 12 and giving them their first entry into the UK top 20. It was also the first of their 17 consecutive top 20 hits on the Irish chart between 1983 and 1992.

The Cure recorded a completely new version of "The Walk" for their remix album Mixed Up (1990), as the original master tapes could not be located. They later recorded an acoustic version for their compilation album, Greatest Hits (2001).

== Reception ==
In a retrospective review for AllMusic, Stewart Mason called the song "an anomaly in the Cure's career, their one true entry in the then-hot synth pop sweepstakes based on sequenced keyboards and chattering drum machine fills and featuring a naggingly catchy synth hook in place of a traditional chorus." Though he called the single "enjoyable enough single on its own slightly dated merits", Mason noted that it "sounds uncomfortably close to a complete ripoff of New Order's 'Blue Monday,' a fact that probably has as much to do with the limited abilities of early sequencers as it does with the phenomenal impact of that pioneering dance-rock single." Ranking it as the Cure's 20th best song in 2025, Mojo wrote that it "could've been just a whimsical one-off in the band's otherwise doomy discography. Yet The Walk unexpectedly, established the happy/sad aesthetic of the many smash singles that followed."

== Track listing ==
7"

1. "The Walk"
2. "The Dream"

12"

1. "The Upstairs Room”
2. "The Dream"
3. "The Walk"
4. "Lament"

US mini-LP

1. "The Upstairs Room"
2. "Just One Kiss"
3. "The Dream"
4. "The Walk"
5. "Lament"
6. "Let's Go to Bed (Extended Version)" (only available on some later European releases)

== Personnel ==
- Robert Smith – vocals; guitar; OB-8
- Lol Tolhurst – Oberheim DMX; DSX; OB-8
