= The Love Cats (song) =

Single by the Cure
- B-side: "Speak My Language"; "Mr. Pink Eyes"
- Released: 21 October 1983
- Recorded: August 1983
- Genre: Jazz; new wave; pop
- Length: 3:33
- Label: Fiction
- Songwriter: Robert Smith
- Producers: Phil Thornalley; Chris Parry; The Cure

The Cure singles chronology
"The Walk" (1983)	"The Love Cats" (1983)	"The Caterpillar" (1984)

Music video
- "The Love Cats" on YouTube

"The Love Cats" (sometimes rendered as "The Lovecats") is a song by English rock band the Cure, released as a stand-alone single in October 1983.

It was the band's first top 10 hit in the UK, peaking at number 7. It also reached number 6 on the Australian chart in early 1984. The single later appeared on the compilation album Japanese Whispers, released in December 1983.

== Inspiration and recording ==
At the time the song was written, Robert Smith was very interested in the work of Australian author Patrick White. According to a number of his fans, Smith was inspired to write "The Love Cats" after reading White's novel The Vivisector (1970), although this claim is difficult to verify. In the novel, the protagonist, Hurtle, is appalled when his lover's husband drowns a sack of stray cats. White draws a parallel between the way in which the cats are discarded, and the treatment of certain characters in the book; by extension, the cats symbolise the most innocent and vulnerable members of society, and the casual cruelty with which they sometimes meet their fate.

The recording session took place in Paris at Studio Des Dames after the band had played a one-off concert in the west of France, in Brittany, in the commune of Saint-Jacut-les-Pins in August 1983. The band recorded other songs there also in jazz rock style, "Speak My Language" and "Mr. Pink Eyes": both ended up on the b-side of the 12-inch vinyl. A fourth track ("A Hand Inside My Mouth (Des Dames Studio Demo 8/83)") also recorded in the same session, surfaced in 2006 on The Top deluxe CD reissue.

== Music video ==
The director of the video was Tim Pope. A 2026 article in The Guardian recounted: "For 'The Lovecats', he [Pope] came across the ideal location in an estate agent’s window. 'They let me view the house and gave me the keys', he sniggers. 'Next thing I know, I’m in there with the crew. Smithy and the boys piling out of the van. The neighbours must have heard 'The Lovecats' coming through the walls.' Pope handed back the keys and the clandestinely shot video went around the world."

The music video features a number of cats and a large lampshade falling on the head of bassist Phil Thornalley. There are many shots of a mansion which the band told a vendor they were interested in buying. They returned the keys in the morning. Real cats were supposed to be used but after proving to be troublesome, taxidermied ones were mostly used instead.

Smith said of the video: "'The Love Cats' is far from being my favourite song: composed drunk, video filmed drunk, promotion made drunk. It was a joke." The video features an early rough mix of the song done in Paris which is different from the one released on vinyl (the latter was done in London).

== Track listing ==
7"

1. "The Love Cats" – 3:33
2. "Speak My Language" – 2:39

UK & US 12"

1. "The Love Cats" (extended version) – 4:37
2. "Speak My Language" – 2:39
3. "Mr. Pink Eyes" – 2:45

== Personnel ==
- Robert Smith – vocals, guitar, piano,
- Lol Tolhurst – vibraphone
- Phil Thornalley – double bass
- Andy Anderson – drums

== Charts ==
=== Weekly charts ===
Weekly chart performance for "The Love Cats"
Chart (1983–1984)	Peak position
Australia (Kent Music Report)	6
Ireland (IRMA)	15
New Zealand (Recorded Music NZ)	23
UK Singles (CIN)	7
US Dance Club Songs (Billboard)	52

2009 weekly chart performance for "The Love Cats"
Chart (2009)	Peak position
Denmark (Tracklisten)	27

=== Year-end charts ===
Year-end chart performance for "The Love Cats"
Chart (1984)	Position
Australia (Kent Music Report)	73

== Certifications ==
Region	Certification	Certified units/sales
New Zealand (RMNZ)	Gold	15,000^{‡}
^{‡} Sales+streaming figures based on certification alone.
