= Pearl Thompson =

English musician

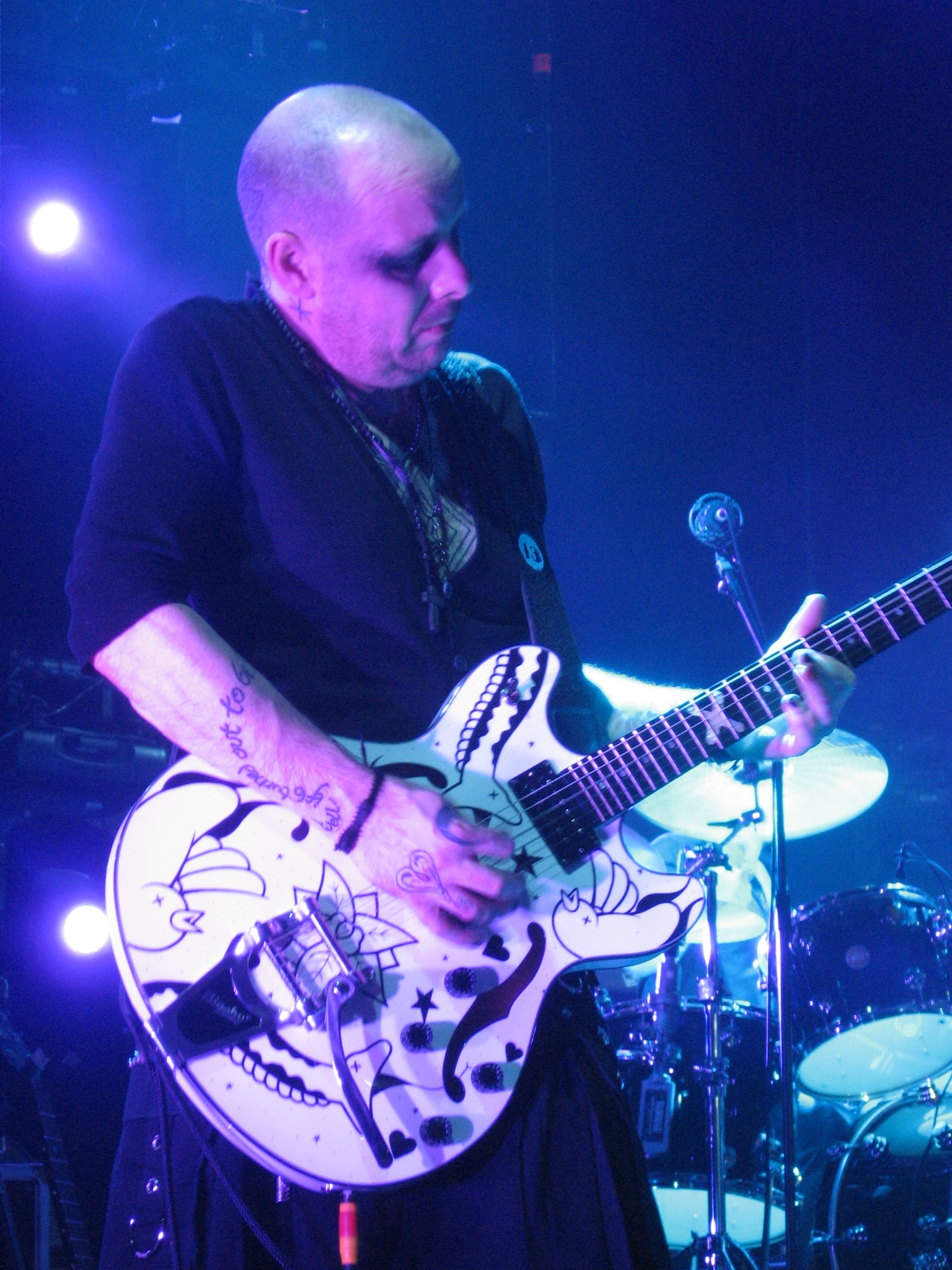
- Thompson performing with the Cure in Sweden in 2007

Background information
- Also known as: Porl Thompson
- Born: 8 November 1957 (age 68); Surrey, England
- Origin: Wimbledon, England
- Genres: Post-punk; gothic rock; new wave; alternative rock; psychedelic rock; lo-fi; experimental
- Occupations: Musician; visual artist
- Instruments: Guitar; keyboards; saxophone; banjo
- Years active: 1976–present
- Formerly of: The Cure; Page and Plant; Babacar

Pearl Thompson (born Paul Stephen Thompson, 8 November 1957) is an English musician and artist. Thompson is best known as a member of the English alternative rock band the Cure from 1983 to 1993 and from 2005 to 2011, during which he was credited as Porl Thompson and played mainly guitar with occasional keyboards and saxophone. After leaving the Cure he focused on a successful career as a visual artist.

== Career ==
Thompson spent his early childhood in London and his family later moved to Crawley. He was a school friend of Robert Smith, Michael Dempsey, and Lol Tolhurst and played with them in various local bands that eventually evolved into the Easy Cure. He adopted the stage name Porl Thompson to avoid confusion with Paul Thompson of Roxy Music. Thompson's guitar style did not mesh with Smith's post-punk songwriting, so he left the Easy Cure to go to art college; the band then changed their name to the Cure.

After art school, Thompson formed an artistic partnership with Andy Vella for music-related projects. Their company was later known as Parched Art. In 1981, Thompson volunteered his services for the Cure's single and album covers, with his first designs for the band being the "Primary" single and then the Faith album. Parched Art would design most of the Cure's album and single covers, along with various other merchandise, until the early 1990s. During this period, Thompson performed music part-time, as a member of the Exotic Pandas and as an occasional contributor for the Glove (a side project by Robert Smith and Steve Severin).

As an album cover artist, Thompson preferred to attend recording sessions so the mood of the music could inform his designs. While observing the Cure in the studio in late 1983, Thompson was invited by Smith to play saxophone on a song that would be included in The Top the following year. Thompson then officially joined the Cure, first appearing in videos and television performances for songs from The Top and playing guitar and keyboards on the ensuing tour, though he did not play on most of the album's studio recordings.

When Robert Smith revamped the Cure's lineup in 1984, Thompson became the band's lead guitarist and occasionally played keyboards and other instruments. He is often cited as the most technically proficient musician in the Cure's history. His first album as a full-time member of the band was The Head on the Door in 1985.

Thompson left the Cure in 1993 to spend more time with his young children. Starting in 1994, he joined the touring band for Page and Plant. In the late 1990s he made guest appearances on albums by Presence and Babacar, both founded by other former members of the Cure, and formed his own short-lived band called Quietly Torn. During this period, Thompson also expanded his artistic career and held his first exhibition in 1999.

In 2002, Thompson contributed to the album Dreamland by Robert Plant. He rejoined the Cure in 2005 and played on their 2008 album 4:13 Dream. During this period, Schecter Guitars released a Thompson signature model featuring graphics by artist Kev Grey. The guitar was featured in the book 108 Rock Star Guitars by photographer Lisa S. Johnson. In 2011 he left the Cure again to focus on art.

Thompson is featured on the 2016 album Callus by rapper Gonjasufi. In 2019, he was inducted into the Rock and Roll Hall of Fame as a member of the Cure.

=== As an artist ===
Thompson and Andy Vella began an artistic partnership in the early 1980s and later co-founded the design firm Parched Art. Known primarily for album and single covers for the Cure, the company's most recognizable sleeves were primarily drawn, painted, or photographed by Thompson. Turning to painting after his first departure from the Cure, Thompson began exhibiting his art in 1999. In 2002, he held an exhibition of paintings in England and Canada titled "100% Sky".

In 2015, Thompson held his first exhibition in the United States, with abstract landscape paintings displayed at MusicHead Art Gallery in Los Angeles under the title "...Through the Eyes of Birds". He then pursued an advanced art degree at the University of Brighton; while a student in 2020, he created the pictorial book Ways of Dying, illustrating types of deaths recorded in London in 1632. He earned a degree in illustration with honors from the university.

== Personal life ==
Friends had long used "Pearl" as a nickname for Thompson. He legally changed his name to Pearl Thompson in 2012 to signify his art career as opposed to his previous music career. Thompson is noted for being reclusive and private. From his early time in the Cure and its predecessor bands, he dated Janet Smith, the younger sister of bandmate Robert Smith. Thompson became Smith's brother-in-law when he married Janet, and the couple had four children before divorcing in 2000. Thompson married his second wife, Dali'esque Thompson, in 2014.

== Discography ==
=== The Cure ===
- Three Imaginary Boys (1979) (Disc 2 of 2004 deluxe issue only)
- The Top (1984)
- Concert (1984)
- The Cure Live in Japan (1984) VHS
- The Head on the Door (1985)
- Standing on a Beach (1986)
- The Cure in Orange (1986), VHS
- Kiss Me, Kiss Me, Kiss Me (1987)
- Disintegration (1989)
- Mixed Up (1990)
- Entreat (1990)
- Wish (1992)
- Show (1993)
- Paris (1993)
- Galore (1997)
- Greatest Hits (2001)
- Festival 2005 (2005), DVD
- 4:13 Dream (2008)

=== Gonjasufi ===
- Callus (2016)
- Mandela Effect (2017)

=== Page and Plant ===
- No Quarter: Jimmy Page and Robert Plant Unledded (1994)

=== Robert Plant ===
- Dreamland (2002)

=== Shelleyan Orphan ===
- Humroot (1992)

=== Babacar ===
- Babacar (1998)
