= Let's Go to Bed (The Cure song) =

Single by The Cure
- B-side: "Just One Kiss"
- Released: 15 November 1982
- Genre: New wave; pop; synth-pop
- Length: 3:33
- Label: Fiction
- Songwriters: Laurence Tolhurst; Robert Smith
- Producer: Chris Parry

The Cure singles chronology
"The Hanging Garden" (1982)	"Let's Go to Bed" (1982)	"The Walk" (1983)

Music video
- "Let's Go To Bed" on YouTube

"Let's Go to Bed" is a song by English rock band the Cure, released as a stand-alone single by Fiction Records in November 1982. In the aftermath of the dark Pornography, Robert Smith returned from a month-long detox in the Lake District to write the song, the antithesis to what the Cure currently represented. It was later included on the compilation album Japanese Whispers, which compiles the band's three singles from 1982 to 1983 and their five B-sides.

The single was only a minor success in the UK, peaking at No. 44, but became a Top 20 hit in Australia in 1983, reaching No. 15 in Australia (for two weeks) and No. 17 in New Zealand.

== History ==
In an interview with Rolling Stone, Robert Smith discussed the initial reaction when playing the song to Fiction Records:

When I took "Lets Go to Bed" to Fiction and played it to them, it was like silence. They looked at me, like, "This is it. He’s really lost it." They said, "You can’t be serious. Your fans are gonna hate it." I understood that, but I wanted to get rid of all that. I didn’t want that side of life anymore; I wanted to do something that’s really kind of cheerful. I thought, "This isn’t going to work. No one’s ever gonna buy into this. It’s so ludicrous that I’m gonna go from goth idol to pop star in three easy lessons."

However, the song became a success much to Smith’s surprise.

Suddenly, "Let’s Go to Bed" was turning into a big hit, on the West Coast particularly, and we had a young, predominantly female, teenage audience. It went from intense, menacing, psychotic goths to people with perfect white teeth. It was a very weird transition, but I enjoyed it. I thought it was really funny. We followed it up with "The Walk" and "Love Cats," and I just felt totally liberated.

On 15 March 1983, the song was the first broadcast for the pioneering Boston-based alternative rock radio station WFNX. When WFNX was sold and ceased broadcasting on 20 July 2012, "Let's Go to Bed" was selected as the station's final broadcast.

== Reception ==
Chris True of AllMusic described the song as "antic, herky-jerky new wave pop", while also observing it as 'poppier than former singles, but still maintains a dark edge. The moody atmospherics and percussive elements of the Cure of old are traded in for offbeat melodies and quirky dance beats." He also said "The song has an almost childlike approach". further stating that the "production feels like kids are trying out new toys."

Pitchfork called it "bratty, funky synthpop". In 2022, Rolling Stone ranked it 19 on their list "100 Best Songs of 1982".

== Music video ==
The song's music video was the band's first collaboration with Tim Pope, who would go on to direct several more videos for the group. The video features members Robert Smith and Lol Tolhurst, who at that point were the only members of the Cure – the only instance in the band's history where the band officially had a two-person lineup. Pope's video treatment displayed the band's more whimsical side, something absent from the band's early work. In his book, Tolhurst also recalls that he was dancing naked behind the screen as a shadowy silhouette.

== Track listing ==
7-inch vinyl

1. "Let's Go to Bed" – 3:35
2. "Just One Kiss" – 4:10

12-inch vinyl

1. "Let's Go to Bed" (Extended Mix) – 7:04
2. "Just One Kiss" (Extended Mix) – 7:02

US 7-inch vinyl

1. "Let's Go to Bed" – 3:34
2. "Boys Don't Cry" – 2:36

US 12-inch vinyl

1. "Let's Go to Bed" – 7:45
2. "Just One Kiss" – 7:18
3. "Let's Go to Bed" (edit) – 3:35

== Personnel ==
- Robert Smith – vocals, guitar, bass, keyboards
- Lol Tolhurst – keyboards
- Steve Goulding – drums

== Charts ==
=== Weekly charts ===
Weekly chart performance for "Let's Go to Bed"
Chart (1983)	Peak position
Australia (Kent Music Report)	15
New Zealand (RMNZ)	17
United Kingdom (OCC)	44
US Billboard Dance/Disco Top 80	32

=== Year-end charts ===
Year-end chart performance for "Let's Go to Bed"
Chart (1983)	Position
Australia (Kent Music Report)	94
