= The Top (album) =

Studio album by the Cure
- Released: 4 May 1984
- Recorded: 1983–1984
- Studios: Genetic Studios, West Berkshire; The Garden, London; Trident, London
- Genres: Post-punk; psychedelic rock; gothic rock; new wave
- Length: 40:55
- Label: Fiction
- Producers: Robert Smith; Chris Parry; David M. Allen

The Cure chronology
Japanese Whispers (1983)	The Top (1984)	Concert: The Cure Live (1984)

Singles from The Top
- 1. "The Caterpillar" Released: 30 March 1984

The Top is the fifth studio album by the English rock band the Cure, released on 4 May 1984 by Fiction Records. The album entered the UK Albums Chart at number ten on 12 May. Shortly after its release, the Cure embarked on a major tour of the United Kingdom, culminating in a three-night residency at the Hammersmith Odeon in London.

== Background and recording ==
After recording psychedelic album Blue Sunshine for the one-off project the Glove during summer 1983, Robert Smith finished off the year composing and working on two other studio albums at the same time: The Top for the Cure and Hyæna for Siouxsie and the Banshees. Smith was still the official guitarist of the Banshees while he wrote The Top.

For The Top, Smith teamed up with Cure co-founding member Lol Tolhurst, who had given up drums for keyboards, and new drummer Andy Anderson, who had previously performed on the UK top 10 single "The Lovecats". Porl Thompson was credited for playing saxophone on "Give Me It". All the songs are credited to Smith but three tracks were co-written with Tolhurst: "The Caterpillar", "Bird Mad Girl" and "Piggy in the Mirror".

== Music ==
The album's style is eclectic, with Smith using various instruments including violin and flute. "Bird Mad Girl" is in a Spanish style, while "Wailing Wall" contains Middle Eastern undertones. Sounds critic Jack Barron described the opening track "Shake Dog Shake" as "urbane metal".

== Promotion and release ==
Prior to its release, the Cure had been promoting the forthcoming album, performing live twice on UK television. In late February, they had played two songs on BBC Two's Oxford Road Show, "Shake Dog Shake" and "Give Me It" and in early April, they had appeared on Channel Four's The Tube to perform three other tracks, "Bananafishbones", "Piggy in the Mirror" and the title track of the record. The Top album was released on 4 May 1984 by record label Fiction. It was a commercial success in the UK, peaking at No. 10 on the UK Albums Chart. "The Caterpillar" was the sole single released from the album.

== Reception ==
Professional ratings
Review scores
Source	Rating
AllMusic	2/5 stars
The Austin Chronicle	2.5/5 stars
The Guardian	4/5 stars
Pitchfork	6.9/10
Q	2/5 stars
Record Mirror	4.5/5 stars
The Rolling Stone Album Guide	2.5/5 stars
Smash Hits	8/10
Sounds	2.5/5 stars
Uncut	4/5 stars

Upon its release, the reaction in the British press was mostly positive. Steve Sutherland of Melody Maker praised the album for its "psychedelia that can't be dated", while Andy Strike of Record Mirror called it "a record of wicked originality and wit". In Smash Hits, Mark Ellen deemed The Top a "weird and wonderful" album with songs that "seem both enticing and faintly dangerous". In contrast, Barron at Sounds noted that The Top is "too often not the true bottom line in reflected experience to be indisposable", but nevertheless prophesied, "In 20 years' time, when the next generation blush with excitement at the word 'Psychedelic', it'll be regarded as a classic". On a more skeptical note, NME reviewer Danny Kelly considered it self-indulgent, qualifying it as "an ambitious, difficult record".

In a retrospective review, Q writer Tom Doyle dismissed The Top as "a transitional record of forgettable songs". Thomas Inskeep of Stylus Magazine wrote that The Top "may well be the nadir of their catalog", concluding he would call it "a transitional album and leave it at that, for what came subsequently was an honest-to-goodness marvel". Chris True of AllMusic noted that while it is "an album obviously recorded under stress, drink, and drugs", Smith's ability "to fuse the paranoia and neuroses of former work with his newfound use of pop melody and outside influences" makes the record "a necessary step in the evolution of the band".

== Track listing ==
All songs written by Robert Smith, except where noted.

Side A
No.	Title	Writer(s)	Length
1.	"Shake Dog Shake"		4:55
2.	"Birdmad Girl"	Smith, Tolhurst	4:05
3.	"Wailing Wall"		5:17
4.	"Give Me It"		3:42
5.	"Dressing Up"		2:51

Side B
No.	Title	Writer(s)	Length
6.	"The Caterpillar"	Smith, Tolhurst	3:40
7.	"Piggy in the Mirror"	Smith, Tolhurst	3:40
8.	"The Empty World"		2:36
9.	"Bananafishbones"		3:12
10.	"The Top"		6:50

2006 Deluxe Edition bonus disc
No.	Title	Length
1.	"You Stayed..." (Robert Smith Home Demo 8/82)	2:21
2.	"Ariel" (Robert Smith Home Demo 8/82)	2:58
3.	"A Hand Inside My Mouth" (Des Dames Studio Demo 8/83)	3:40
4.	"Sadacic" (Olympic Studio Robert Smith Demo 12/83)	4:17
5.	"Shake Dog Shake" (Garden/Eden Studios Robert Smith and Andy Anderson Demo 12/83)	4:56
6.	"Piggy in the Mirror" (Garden/Eden Studios Robert Smith and Andy Anderson Demo 12/83)	3:40
7.	"Birdmad Girl" (Garden/Eden Studios Robert Smith and Andy Anderson Demo 12/83)	3:36
8.	"Give Me It" (Garden/Eden Studios Robert Smith and Andy Anderson Demo 12/83)	3:43
9.	"Throw Your Foot" (Garden/Eden Studios Robert Smith and Andy Anderson Demo 12/83)	3:31
10.	"Happy the Man" (Garden/Eden Studios Robert Smith and Andy Anderson Demo 12/83)	2:46
11.	"The Caterpillar" (Garden/Eden Studios Robert Smith and Andy Anderson Demo 12/83)	4:17
12.	"Dressing Up" (Genetic Studio Guide Vocal/Rough Mix 2/84)	2:14
13.	"Wailing Wall" (Genetic Studio Rough Mix 2/84)	4:59
14.	"The Empty World" (Live Bootleg – Hammersmith Odeon 5/84)	2:47
15.	"Bananafishbones" (Live Bootleg – Hammersmith Odeon 5/84)	2:57
16.	"The Top" (Live Bootleg – Hammersmith Odeon 5/84)	7:13
17.	"Forever" (Version; Live Bootleg – Zenith Paris 5/84)	4:58

== Personnel ==
The Cure

- Robert Smith – guitars, vocals, bass, keyboards, recorder (3), violin (6), harmonica (9)
- Lol Tolhurst – keyboards
- Andy Anderson – drums, percussion

Additional musicians

- Porl Thompson – saxophone (on disc 1 and 2), keyboards, guitars (on live tracks on disc 2)
- Phil Thornalley – bass (on live tracks on disc 2)

Production

- Robert Smith – production
- Dave Allen – production, engineering
- Chris Parry – production
- Howard Gray – engineering

== Charts ==
Chart (1984)	Peak position
Australian Albums (Kent Music Report)	55
Dutch Albums (Album Top 100)	12
German Albums (Offizielle Top 100)	44
New Zealand Albums (RMNZ)	23
Swedish Albums (Sverigetopplistan)	31
UK Albums (Official Charts)	10
US Billboard 200	180

== Certifications ==
Region	Certification	Certified units/sales
United Kingdom (BPI)	Silver	60,000^{^}
^{^} Shipments figures based on certification alone.
