= Entreat =

1991 live album by the Cure

Live album by the Cure
- Released: 25 March 1991
- Recorded: July 1989
- Venue: Wembley Arena (London)
- Genre: Gothic rock
- Length: 47:09 (1991); 69:26 (2010)
- Label: Fiction
- Producer: The Cure

The Cure chronology
| Mixed Up (1990) | Entreat (1991) | Wish (1992) |

Professional ratings
Review scores
| Source | Rating |
|---|---|
| AllMusic | 4/5 stars |
| Record Mirror | 7/10 |
| Sounds | 3/5 stars |

Entreat is a live album by the English rock band the Cure, recorded at London's Wembley Arena in July 1989. It consists entirely of songs performed from the band's 1989 record Disintegration while they were on their international Prayer tour. Initially, Entreat was distributed exclusively in France as a promotional tool in 1989 and then was given away free by HMV stores in the UK and Ireland to customers who purchased two CDs from the band's back catalogue in May 1990. It was then given a full commercial release in March 1991.

The last two tracks were released in 1989 as B-sides to the US version of "Lullaby". "Fascination Street", "Last Dance", "Prayers for Rain", and "Disintegration" were also included as B-sides on the "Pictures of You" CD single.

The re-release of Disintegration in 2010 featured a remastered version of Entreat remixed by Cure frontman Robert Smith, entitled Entreat Plus because it featured all twelve songs from the album, including the four excluded from the original. It was the first time the album was released worldwide, though it had already been released on CD before.

== Track listing ==
All songs written by Robert Smith, Simon Gallup, Boris Williams, Porl Thompson, Roger O'Donnell, and Lol Tolhurst.

1. "Pictures of You" – 7:08
2. "Closedown" – 4:23
3. "Last Dance" – 4:41
4. "Fascination Street" – 5:20
5. "Prayers for Rain" – 4:49
6. "Disintegration" – 7:41
7. "Homesick" – 6:49
8. "Untitled" – 6:33

=== Entreat Plus ===
1. "Plainsong" – 5:19
2. "Pictures of You" – 7:04
3. "Closedown" – 4:22
4. "Lovesong" – 3:24
5. "Last Dance" – 4:37
6. "Lullaby" – 4:14
7. "Fascination Street" – 5:10
8. "Prayers for Rain" – 4:50
9. "The Same Deep Water as You" – 10:03
10. "Disintegration" – 7:54
11. "Homesick" – 6:47
12. "Untitled" – 6:45

== Personnel ==
- Robert Smith – vocals, guitar, six-string bass
- Simon Gallup – bass guitar
- Porl Thompson – guitar
- Boris Williams – drums
- Roger O'Donnell – keyboards

== Charts ==
Chart performance for Entreat
| Chart (1991) | Peak position |
|---|---|
| Australian Albums (ARIA) | 25 |
| Austrian Albums (Ö3 Austria) | 19 |
| Dutch Albums (Album Top 100) | 88 |
| Finnish Albums (Suomen virallinen lista) | 29 |
| German Albums (Offizielle Top 100) | 15 |
| New Zealand Albums (RMNZ) | 8 |
| Swiss Albums (Schweizer Hitparade) | 31 |
| UK Albums (Official Charts) | 10 |
