= Untitled (The Cure song) =

Song by the Cure

from the album Disintegration
- Released: 2 May 1989
- Genre: Dream pop; folk rock
- Length: 6:30
- Songwriters: Robert Smith; Simon Gallup; Porl Thompson; Boris Williams; Roger O'Donnell; Lol Tolhurst
- Producers: David M. Allen; Robert Smith

"Untitled" is a song by English rock band the Cure. It serves as the twelfth and final track on the band's eight studio album Disintegration (1989). Frontman and singer Robert Smith has called the song one of his "favourite Cure songs".

A live version of the song features as the B-side on the Elektra releases of "Lullaby" (1989), this live version is also present on the live album Entreat (1991).

== Composition and themes ==
Unlike the rest of the album, frontman Robert Smith called the song "a hopeful song in a hopeless world", making it differ from the usual wholly pessimistic tone present on the album. The Quietus said along with the previous track "Homesick", the song served as a "comedown from a heavy dose of grief" that dominated the album's title track. Neil Crossley of Classic Pop felt the song had "a sense of completion and resolution" noting "Smith’s underplayed and perfectly judged vocal delivery resting easily amongst the chiming guitars, epic snare and almost upbeat melody.", calling it a "moving and enigmatic end to a landmark album." Far Out felt it was "folkier" than the rest of the album and demonstrated the band being "able to flip between moods and genres with ease". Paste called it "one of the greatest finales in all of rock ‘n’ roll, as the Cure let the melancholia become even more tragic".

Ed Jupp of God Is In The TV said the track featured "some of Smith’s most heartfelt lyrics ever", while Treblezine observed the lyrics describing "an incompleteness of a feeling that has yet to be resolved" and saw it as "an attempt – perhaps like most attempts at emotional closure where love is concerned, a misguided one – to say all the right words and charming things before putting away those photographs forever, or at least for a little while."

== Title ==
Robert Smith has stated that he liked the fact he decided to leave the song untitled, saying he "had the courage to not bother to think of a title". Kenneth Partridge of Billboard joked of the song's title that it was "a tune so depressing that Smith couldn’t even give it a name"

== Legacy ==
The song was covered by American hardcore band Together We Fall for the tribute album Disintegrated - A Cure Tribute Compilation (2000).

Silvi Wersing of Chorusgirl called it her favourite song by the Cure, saying "every instrument has space to breathe, and in the end a fade-out that just leaves the synth riff as a bookend" claiming it to be the "perfect album closer."

When the band performed the song as a part of Disintegration's 30th anniversary live shows, where they played the whole album and its B-side, Robert Smith said he found performing the song "actually quite difficult" as he says the song “has a lot of emotional … baggage isn’t the right word. It’s just that for me, it’s a very important song. It proved very difficult, actually, for me to sing it convincingly to myself because I had to put myself back into a time and a place where I was very, very unhappy."

== Personnel ==
- Robert Smith – guitars, vocals, keyboards, six string bass
- Simon Gallup – bass, keyboards
- Porl Thompson – guitars
- Boris Williams – drums, percussion
- Roger O'Donnell – keyboards
- Lol Tolhurst – other instruments
