= Homesick (The Cure song) =

Song by the Cure

from the album Disintegration
- Released: 2 May 1989
- Genre: Gothic rock
- Length: 7:06
- Label: Fiction
- Songwriters: Robert Smith; Simon Gallup; Porl Thompson; Boris Williams; Roger O'Donnell; Lol Tolhurst
- Producers: David M. Allen; Robert Smith

"Homesick" is a song by English rock band the Cure. It is the eleventh song on the band's eighth studio album Disintegration (1989), though it was omitted on the original vinyl releases of the album alongside "Last Dance", due to spacing issues. Both songs were called bonus tracks on CD releases by Elektra at the time of release, and were included on all vinyl pressing from the 2010 reissue onwards due to the album being released as a double vinyl.

A live version of the song features as the B-side on the Elektra releases of "Lullaby" (1989), this live version is also present on the live album Entreat (1991).

== Background ==
Unlike the rest of the songs on the album, according to keyboardist Roger O'Donnell the song's foundation was composed by Lol Tolhurst. This would be Tolhurst's only notable contribution, despite being credited on all songs on the album. Due to his increasing alcoholism, he was incapable of working with the band, which caused tension in the album's creation and was fired as the band began planning to tour. O'Donnell said if the band members mentioned Tolhurst's contribution to the song in the studio, frontman Robert Smith would get angry and threaten to take it off the album.

== Composition and themes ==
Many critics found the song notable for its emotional sound and inclusion of piano, which many felt added to its emotional weight. Classic Pop described the addition of piano as "plaintive" and described Robert Smith's vocals as "stripped bare with honesty and what seems like tired emotional resignation" finding Smith's singing had "beautiful delivery, almost atonal at times, which only heightens the intent of the lyrics". The Independent felt the song "cries out for attention, but seems to recognise in moments the benignity of the universe, as if to accept it." Billboard felt Smith lyrics portrayed him "still crying out for love, only this time, he doesn’t want safety or security". Ned Raggett, writing for The Quietus, said along with the following track "Untitled", the song served as a "comedown from a heavy dose of grief" that dominated the album's title track.

Far Out felt that it was the album's "most fully-realised deep cut" and that its "lovely interplay between piano and strings" showed "that the softer side of The Cure was still intact". Ed Jupp of God Is In The TV felt the song resembled the title track from the band fourth studio album Pornography (1982) saying "it sees the urge to finish things and yet seek resolution or absolution". Albumism described Smith's delivery as "strained and unsteady here, warbled against gleaming piano, as though, through tears, he’s singing himself to sleep."

== Legacy ==
Several artists covered the song:

- American hardcore band Home 33 for the tribute album Disintegrated - A Cure Tribute Compilation (2000)
- American post-metal band Rosetta for a split album with Year of No Light and East of the Wall (2009)
- Ukrainian stoner metal band Stoned Jesus performed the song live in concert

== Personnel ==
- Robert Smith – guitars, vocals, keyboards, six string bass
- Simon Gallup – bass, keyboards
- Porl Thompson – guitars
- Boris Williams – drums, percussion
- Roger O'Donnell – keyboards
- Lol Tolhurst – other instruments
