= Disintegration (The Cure song) =

- The sleeve for the Spanish promo single released in 1989.

Song by the Cure

from the album Disintegration
- Released: 2 May 1989
- Genre: Gothic rock; post-punk; dream pop
- Length: 8:18
- Label: Fiction
- Songwriters: Robert Smith; Simon Gallup; Porl Thompson; Boris Williams; Roger O'Donnell; Lol Tolhurst
- Producers: David M. Allen; Robert Smith

"Disintegration" is a song by English rock band the Cure. It is the tenth track from the band's eighth studio album Disintegration (1989) and is often cited as one of the band's strongest songs and a highlight on the album for its intense and repetitive sound. It is the second longest song on the album, clocking in a little over eight minutes. Ned Raggett, writing for The Quietus, referred to frontman Robert Smith's vocal delivery and lyrics as "a sprawling, reeling act of desperation, on which Smith unlocked a Pandora’s Box of self-loathing" finding the song "almost too much – too transparent and psychologically invasive". Paste called it "one of the greatest title tracks ever", saying "Smith sounds like he's, quite literally, on the verge of disintegrating".

The song was also released as a single, which was released in 1989 exclusively in Spain, featuring the album's opening track "Plainsong" as the B-side.

== Composition and themes ==
The song's repetitive structure was well received by critics, with Classic Pop noting that along with the rest of the album, it defied traditional song structures. He felt this was one of the song's strength, saying it "builds emotionally through repetition", while also acknowledging the song's dominant lyrics, which differed from the usually sparse lyrics across the rest of the album, describing Smith's delivery as a "relatively wordy succession of lines that are more direct, dealing head-on with defiance and emotional despair". The Independent said it "rattles through its eight minutes with feverish intent and increasingly desperate desolation".

Ned Raggett, writing for AllMusic, said it "in some ways encapsulates the album as a whole -- accessible but ultimately harrowing destruction" finding it "almost pitilessly portrays a relationship tearing itself to pieces in drama and soul-wrenching grief" and described the song as "Robert Smith's commanding lead guitar lines at once are scaled to epic heights while at the same time buried in the mix, almost as if they're trying to burst from behind the upfront rhythm assault. Roger O'Donnell's keyboards add both extra shade and melody, while Smith's singing is intentionally delivered in a combination of cutting clarity and low resignation, at times further distorted with extra vocal treatments."

The song has been compared to the song "One Hundred Years", which serves as the opening track to the band's fourth studio album Pornography (1982), due to their relentless pounding drums and repetitive structures. When Robert Smith was asked if this was intentional, he agreed they were musically similar as "there’s the same insistence in drum and bass" but said the lyrics were very different, with "Disintegration" being "about getting away from someone," and addressing, "the horrors of a relationship" while "One Hundred Years" addresses themes of "upset of everything" and "giving up". Ed Jupp of God Is In The TV stated it was "possibly" drummer Boris Williams’ "finest track" and that it was the only song on the album that could have appeared on Pornography.

The lyrics have been praised for their provocative and relentless nature, Far Out felt they were among Smith's greatest lyrics, citing "It’s easier for me to get closer to heaven than to ever feel whole again.” as staying with the listener and saw them as representing "Smith's parting words, a reminder that if he wants to leave, he has the right to." Rolling Stone claimed "Smith’s sense of madness keeps increasing as the song reaches its apex, making for, arguably, his greatest performance as a singer." Marie Ducote, writing for The Vermillion called it "one of the most tragic songs " and linked the song to "Pictures of You", observing "the photos Smith speaks of sound almost like he is confessing his wrongs: when he sings 'pictures of trickery' he knows it is his fault the relationship has ended, but in 'Pictures of You' the photographs are the last tangible reminder of the deep love he had." Rayna Khaitan of Albumism noted the "song follows the eddying journey of a relationship breaking, recounting all the arguments, mistakes and unfulfilled wishes in a vicious storm of emotion, until Smith arrives at the inevitably painful conclusion". NME claimed the song "tarnishes the promises made in ‘Lovesong’, the guitars snarling and Smith spitting out a stream of consciousness that talks of “treachery” and “trickery”".

== Legacy ==
The song was covered by American hardcore band Converge for the tribute album Disintegrated - A Cure Tribute Compilation (2000). American psychedelic folk band Big Blood covered the song, but changed the lyrics "babies and everything” to “babies and frequency”. In 2011 American dream pop band Snow & Voices covered the song as a part of their "Covers Project".

== Personnel ==
- Robert Smith – guitars, vocals, keyboards, six string bass
- Simon Gallup – bass, keyboards
- Porl Thompson – guitars
- Boris Williams – drums, percussion
- Roger O'Donnell – keyboards
- Lol Tolhurst – other instruments
