= The Truth in Me =

Studio album by Roger O'Donnell
- Released: 24 October 2006
- Recorded: Devon, England

Roger O'Donnell chronology
Grey Clouds, Red Sky (1994)	The Truth in Me (2006)	Songs from the Silver Box (2009)

The Truth in Me is the first released solo album by Cure keyboardist Roger O'Donnell. It was recorded in Devon, England using only the Minimoog Voyager synthesizer as a sound source, plus vocals by Erin Lang. MIDI and audio were captured in the software program Digital Performer. Mixing was done at Uphon Studios in Germany and mastered at The Exchange in London.

== Track listing ==
1. "My Days"
2. "For the Truth in You"
3. "The Truth in Me"
4. "Not Without You"
5. "He Sent You Angels"
6. "Treasure"
7. "This Is a Story"
8. "This Grey Morning"
9. "Tired of All This"
10. "...And So I Close My Eyes"

== Recording ==
Following inclusion of the song "Another Year Away" on the Moog Documentary Soundtrack, O'Donnell was encouraged by one of the producers of the film to do an entire album orchestrated with a Minimoog Voyager. Because O'Donnell had enjoyed working with it on the soundtrack, the idea appealed to him.

This record was released on O'Donnell's 99 Times Out of 10 Records.
