= Plainsong (song) =

- The sleeve for the Spanish promo single released in 1989.

Song by The Cure

from the album Disintegration
- Released: 2 May 1989
- Genre: Psychedelic rock; dream pop; gothic rock
- Length: 5:12
- Label: Fiction
- Songwriters: Robert Smith; Simon Gallup; Porl Thompson; Boris Williams; Roger O'Donnell; Lol Tolhurst
- Producers: David M. Allen; Robert Smith

"Plainsong" is a song by English rock band the Cure. It serves as the opening track to the band's eighth studio album, Disintegration (1989). The song is regarded as one of the band's greatest. It has been described as the "perfect opener" for the album and as one of the greatest opening tracks of all time. Vice described "Plainsong" and the song that follows it, "Pictures of You", as a one-two punch that is "one of the most evocative introductions ever committed to tape".

"Plainsong" was also released as the B-side to the single release of "Disintegration", which was released in 1989 exclusively in Spain. The song was also remixed on the remix album Torn Down (2018).

== Composition and themes ==
Reviewer Serg Childed referred to the lyrics of "Plainsong" as "a dialogue in which the first speaker describes natural phenomena such as darkness, cold, and rain while their companion dramatizes the situation by comparing each event to the end of the world and portending death". Another reviewer felt Robert Smith's age added "a sort-of oblivious sex appeal, a cool that wouldn't work had Smith been a few years older", while calling the song "incomparably epic in its intro".

The song is noted for its lengthy introduction, which starts with quiet wind chimes and then the crash of a drum followed by soaring synthesisers, pounding drums and heavy bass. The vocals are quiet and appear after two minutes into the song, which has been seen as "the voice [...] struggling to make itself heard through the distorted meteorology of a storm". Critic Neil Crossley stated that the song "immers[ed] the listener in Smith's turbulent, doom-laden world"; he opined that the lyrics portray "a girl who compares the weather to death and complains about feeling old". Biographer Jeff Apter described the song as "unravelling ever so slowly in a shower of synths and guitars". Treblezine said that the song was "a mesmerising opening statement that's gothic in the manner of a cathedral". John Freeman of The Quietus noted keyboardist Roger O'Donnell's "‘walls of synthesizers'" and called the song a "gothic funeral march".

== Legacy ==
The song was covered by American rock band Cave In for the tribute album Disintegrated - A Cure Tribute Compilation (2000). In 2010, Robert Smith donated handwritten and autographed lyrics of the song along with a promotional poster for deluxe edition of Disintegration to the "Art of the Song" auction, a fundraiser for the Teenage Cancer Trust.

The song plays a role in the climax of the film Ant-Man (2015), playing when an iPhone's Siri mishears the villain, Corey Stoll's Darren Cross, saying "I'm going to disintegrate you"; director Peyton Reed said that "Plainsong" is "such an epic song that it transcended the joke". In 2023, Smith was seen singing the last lines of the song to his wife, Mary Poole, who was backstage during one of their concerts on the Shows of a Lost World tour. He was also seen crying onstage while playing the song at a later date on the tour.

The song has featured on many song ranking lists for the band. The Ringer ranked it fourth on a list of the band's 50 best songs, stating that the introduction "is what it would sound like if the heavens were to suddenly burst open". Billboard ranked it fifth out of the Cure's 40 greatest songs, described it as "a slowly unfolding poem for the apocalypse", and compared it to the work of the Scottish rock band Cocteau Twins.

== Personnel ==
- Robert Smith – guitars, vocals, keyboards, six string bass
- Simon Gallup – bass, keyboards
- Porl Thompson – guitars
- Boris Williams – drums, percussion
- Roger O'Donnell – keyboards
- Lol Tolhurst – other instruments
