= Prayers for Rain (song) =

Song by the Cure

from the album Disintegration
- Released: 2 May 1989
- Genre: Post-punk; gothic rock
- Length: 6:05
- Label: Fiction
- Songwriters: Robert Smith; Simon Gallup; Porl Thompson; Boris Williams; Roger O'Donnell; Lol Tolhurst
- Producers: David M. Allen; Robert Smith

"Prayers for Rain" is a song by English rock band the Cure. It is the eighth track from the band's eighth studio album Disintegration (1989) and is often seen as one of the band's strongest songs, with many praising its atmosphere and depressing sound. Ned Raggett called it "the most extreme song on an extreme album" saying it was "the heart of Disintegration, an evocative, wounding portrayal of emotional desolation", while The Indiependent felt that alongside "Fascination Street", it saw the band "latch on to a moody post-punk tone, but deliver a more refined, adult meaning."

== Composition and themes ==
Many critics praised the songs depressing tone and also felt its lyrics reflected frontman Robert Smith's dominating fear of ageing, which was the fear that swayed Smith to bring a darker, more introspective tone to the album as a whole. Ned Raggett, writing for AllMusic, described the song's sound: "Robert Smith's guitar work takes prominence here, he and Porl Thompson amping up and treating their work to heavy duty flanging, delay, backwards-run tapes and more to set the slow, moody crawl of the track. Boris Williams' slow, start-stop drum work makes everything even creepier, while Roger O'Donnell adds both a prominent bit of doomy string synth and subtler, soft moans and notes throughout the mix." John Freeman also described the song, writing for The Quietus, as a "stark contrast" with the song "Fascination Street", saying "while the driving throb of 'Fascination Street' spoke of "Pull on your hair and pull on your pout" in an act of defiant showmanship and a mirror into Smith's view of his celebrity status", he said "Prayers for Rain" was "a beautiful sonic death mask". Billboard called it a "formless tune outfitted with a great hook" that "may be the disc's most over-the-top melodramatic moment". Albumism felt it "shows Smith in an abject state, desperately looking for a way out".

American Songwriter said that despite the song's "hopeless" sound it "feels warm and inviting" calling it a "shared lament between Smith and his audience", and also saw the "metaphor of nourishing rain finds him begging for a kind of rebirth". Far Out noted its "extra edge of aggression" brought the song "to desolate heights, making it a depressing yet highly affecting track". Treblezine called the song a "cavernous menace", while XS Noize said that it was "atmospheric and hypnotic" and felt the lyrics showed "desolation inspired by Smith's fears of failure and ageing are crystal clear and painful." The Ringer called it "Smith at his most desperate, calling out for a salvation that seems all but impossible" praising drummer Boris Williams for providing "cinematic drumrolls", which they felt "punctuated" the "sound of being sucked into the ocean of despair".

== Legacy ==
The song was covered by American hardcore band Compression for the tribute album Disintegrated - A Cure Tribute Compilation (2000). It was also covered by Halo In Reverse. There is a cover band for the Cure named Prayers for Rain.

== Personnel ==
- Robert Smith – guitars, vocals, keyboards, six string bass
- Simon Gallup – bass, keyboards
- Porl Thompson – guitars
- Boris Williams – drums, percussion
- Roger O'Donnell – keyboards
- Lol Tolhurst – other instruments
