= Freedom Lasso =

Studio album by Akala
- Released: 1 October 2007
- Recorded: 2007
- Genre: Hip hop, electro, alternative rock
- Length: 39:27
- Label: Illa State Records

Akala chronology
It's Not a Rumour (2006)	Freedom Lasso (2007)	DoubleThink (2010)

Singles from Freedom Lasso
- 1. "Bit by Bit" Released: 17 September 2007; 2. "Freedom Lasso" Released: 1 October 2007; 3. "Where I'm From" Released: 21 October 2007; 4. "Comedy Tragedy History" Released: 3 April 2008

Freedom Lasso is the second album by English rapper Akala, released on 1 October 2007 on Illa State Records.

"Love in my Eyes", featuring a sample with Siouxsie Sioux's voice, is a cover version of the Siouxsie and the Banshees' song "Love in a Void" while "I Don't Know" lifted the guitar riff of the Cure's single "Lullaby".

Upon release, the album was hailed by Metro for its "wittily constructed rhymes", "so bold and brassy".

== Track listing ==
#	Title	Featured guest(s)	Producer(s)	Length
1	"Electro Livin'"		Reza Safinia	3:11
2	"Freedom Lasso"		Reza Safinia	3:07
3	"Love in My Eyes"		Reza Safinia	2:49
4	"Comedy Tragedy History"	Violin by Annasara Lundgren	Reza Safinia	3:58
5	"You Put a Spell on Me"		Reza Safinia	4:14
6	"Where I'm From"		Reza Safinia	4:47
7	"Defeated"		Reza Safinia	3:08
8	"Bit by Bit"		Reza Safinia	3:38
9	"Something Inside My Head"		Reza Safinia	3:54
10	"I Don't Know"		Reza Safinia	3:58
11	"I'm Gone" (Rare Bonus Track)		Reza Safinia	2:49
