= Disintegration (The Cure album) =

Studio album by the Cure
- Released: 2 May 1989
- Recorded: November 1988 – February 1989
- Studios: Hookend (Checkendon, England)
- Genres: Gothic rock; dream pop; post-punk; alternative rock
- Length: 72:11
- Label: Fiction
- Producers: David M. Allen; Robert Smith

The Cure chronology
The Peel Sessions (1988)	Disintegration (1989)	Mixed Up (1990)

Singles from Disintegration
- 1. "Lullaby" Released: 10 April 1989; 2. "Fascination Street" Released: 18 April 1989; 3. "Lovesong" Released: 21 August 1989; 4. "Pictures of You" Released: 19 March 1990

Disintegration is the eighth studio album by the English rock band the Cure, released on 2 May 1989, by Fiction Records. The band recorded the album at Hookend Recording Studios in Checkendon, Oxfordshire, with co-producer David M. Allen from late 1988 to early 1989.

The album marks a return to the introspective gothic rock style the band had established in the early 1980s. As he neared the age of 30, vocalist and guitarist Robert Smith had felt an increased pressure to follow up on the band's pop successes with a more enduring work. This, coupled with a distaste for the group's newfound popularity, caused Smith to lapse back into the use of hallucinogenic drugs, the effects of which had a strong influence on the production of the album. Following the completion of the mixing, founding member Lol Tolhurst was fired from the band.

Disintegration became the band's highest charting album up to that point, reaching number three on the UK Albums Chart and number 12 on the US Billboard 200, and produced several hit singles, including "Lovesong", which peaked at number two on the Billboard Hot 100. It remains the band's highest-selling record to date, with more than four million copies sold worldwide. It was greeted with a warm critical reception before later being widely acclaimed, including being placed at number 116 on Rolling Stone magazine's list of the "500 Greatest Albums of All Time" in 2020. Stephen Thomas Erlewine of AllMusic called it the "culmination of all the musical directions the Cure were pursuing over the course of the '80s".

== Background ==
The band's 1987 double album Kiss Me, Kiss Me, Kiss Me was commercially successful, with a sold-out world tour booked in its wake. Despite the international success the band was now enjoying, internal friction was increasing due to Lol Tolhurst's increasing alcoholism at the time. Keyboardist Roger O'Donnell (who had recently been touring with The Psychedelic Furs), was soon hired as a second touring keyboardist. As Tolhurst's alcohol consumption increased, the other band members would tease Tolhurst, leading Smith to later comment that his behaviour was similar to that of "some kind of handicapped child being constantly poked with a stick". At the end of the Kissing Tour in support of the album, Smith became uncomfortable with the side effects of being a pop star and moved to Maida Vale (in West London) with fiancée Mary Poole. Regularly taking LSD to cope with his depression, Smith once again felt the band was being misunderstood and sought to return to its dark side with their next record.

== Recording and production ==
Smith's anguish prior to the recording of Disintegration gave way to the realisation on his 29th birthday that he would turn 30 in one year. This realisation was frightening to him, as he felt all the masterpieces in rock and roll had been completed well before its creators had reached such an age. Smith consequently began to write music without the rest of the band. The material he had written instantly took a dismal, depressing form, which he credited to "the fact that I was gonna be thirty". The band convened at drummer Boris Williams's home and compared their individual demos that each member recorded, and they rated them "1 to 10", then the group met later at a second session and recorded a total of 32 songs at Williams's house with a 16-track recorder by the end of the summer. Of these 32 songs, 12 would make it onto the final album.

When the band entered Hook End Manor Studios, their attitude had turned sour towards Tolhurst's escalating alcohol abuse, although Smith insisted that his displeasure was caused by a meltdown in the face of recording the band's career-defining album and reaching 30. Displeased with the swollen egos he believed his bandmates possessed, Smith entered what he considered to be "one of my non-talking modes" deciding "I would be monk-like and not talk to anyone. It was a bit pretentious really, looking back, but I actually wanted an environment that was slightly unpleasant". He sought to abandon the mood present on Kiss Me, Kiss Me, Kiss Me and the pop singles they had released, and rather recreate the atmosphere of the band's fourth album Pornography (1982). Despite the serious subject matter of the album, O'Donnell commented in 2009 that the atmosphere in the studio was still upbeat during the sessions: "I remember very clearly laughing and joking and fooling around in the control room while Robert was singing 'Disintegration', and then all of us trying to be serious when he came in to listen back.[...] It was never a serious atmosphere in the studio, and when you think about the album and how dark it is, I'm sure people think we were sitting around slitting our wrists with candles and chains hanging from the walls."

While Tolhurst had contributed to the foundation of the song "Homesick" (according to O'Donnell), his musical contributions to the album were marginal as his alcohol abuse rendered him more or less incapable of playing. The other members, finally, threatened to quit if Tolhurst was not fired before the end of the recording session. When Tolhurst arrived to the mixing of the album, and then became excessively drunk, a shouting match ensued and he left the building furious; three weeks later, Smith decided to terminate his tenure with the band prior to the band's upcoming tour. It was during this period that O'Donnell was asked by Smith to become a full-time member, instead of simply a touring musician. Despite Tolhurst's ejection from the group, Smith told NME in April 1989, "He'll probably be back by Christmas. He's getting married, maybe that's his comeback." Tolhurst briefly reunited with the band in 2011 during the Reflection tour.

== Music ==
Disintegration was Smith's thematic return to a dark and gloomy aesthetic that the Cure had explored in the early 1980s. Smith deliberately sought to record an album that was depressing, as it was a reflection of the despondency he felt at the time. The sound of the album was a shock to the band's American label Elektra Records; the label requested Smith shift the release date back several months. Smith recalled "they thought I was being 'wilfully obscure', which was an actual quote from the letter [Smith received from Elektra]. Ever since then I realised that record companies don't have a fucking clue what The Cure does and what The Cure means." Despite rumours that Smith was one of the only contributors to the record, he confirmed that more than half of the dozen tracks on Disintegration had substantial musical input from the rest of the band.

Disintegration is characterised by a significant usage of synthesizers and keyboards, slow, "droning" guitar progressions and Smith's introspective vocals. "Plainsong", the album's opener, "set the mood for Disintegration perfectly", according to biographer Jeff Apter, by "unravelling ever so slowly in a shower of synths and guitars, before Smith steps up to the mic, uttering snatches of lyrics ('I'm so cold') as if he were reading from something as sacred as the Dead Sea Scroll." Smith felt the song was a perfect opener for the record, describing it as "very lush, very orchestral". The album's third track, "Closedown", contains layers of keyboard texture complemented with a slow, gloomy guitar line. The track was written by Smith as a means to list his physical and artistic shortcomings. Despite the dark mood present throughout Disintegration, "Lovesong" was an upbeat track that became a hit in the United States. Ned Raggett of AllMusic noted the difference from other songs: "the Simon Gallup/Boris Williams rhythm section create a tight, serviceable dance groove, while Smith and Porl Thompson add further guitar fills and filigrees as well, adding just enough extra bite to the song. Smith himself delivers the lyric softly, with gentle passion." "Fascination Street" is based on a bassline with a "descending four-note arpeggio". The Cure biographer Simon Price remarked that the lead guitar on "Fascination Street" was "strikingly similar to one played by John McGeoch on "Israel" by Siouxsie and the Banshees", a song Smith had played a lot when stinting as a guitarist of the Banshees.

Much of the album made use of a considerable amount of guitar effects. "Prayers for Rain", a depressing track (Raggett noted: "the phrase 'savage torpor' probably couldn't better be applied anywhere else than to this song") sees Thompson and Smith "treating their work to heavy-duty flanging, delay, backwards-run tapes and more to set the slow, moody crawl of the track." Others, like the title track, are notable for "Smith's commanding lead guitar lines [that are] scaled to epic heights while at the same time buried in the mix, almost as if they're trying to burst from behind the upfront rhythm assault. Roger O'Donnell's keyboards add both extra shade and melody, while Smith's singing is intentionally delivered in a combination of cutting clarity and low resignation, at times further distorted with extra vocal treatments."

While the album mainly consists of sombre tracks, "Lovesong", "Pictures of You" and "Lullaby" were equally popular for their accessibility. Smith wanted to create a balance on the album by including songs that would act as an equilibrium with those that were unpleasant. Smith wrote "Lovesong" as a wedding present for Mary Poole. The lyrics had a noticeably different mood than the rest of the record, but Smith felt it was an integral component of the album: "It's an open show of emotion. It's not trying to be clever. It's taken me ten years to reach the point where I feel comfortable singing a very straightforward love song." The lyrics were a notable shift in his ability to reveal affection. In the past, Smith felt it necessary to disguise or mask such a statement. He noted that without "Lovesong", Disintegration would have been radically different: "That one song, I think, makes many people think twice. If that song wasn't on the record, it would be very easy to dismiss the album as having a certain mood. But throwing that one in sort of upsets people a bit because they think, 'That doesn't fit'." "Pictures of You", while upbeat, contained poignant lyrics ("Screamed at the make-believe/Screamed at the sky/You finally found all your courage to let it all go") with a "two-chord cascade of synthesizer slabs, interweaving guitar and bass lines, passionate singing and romantic lyrics." "Lullaby" is composed of what Apter calls "sharp stabs" of rhythmic guitar chords with Smith whispering the words. The premise for the song came to Smith after remembering lullabies his father would sing him when he could not sleep: "[My father] would always make them up. There was always a horrible ending. They would be something like 'sleep now, pretty baby or you won't wake up at all.'"

== Release ==
Disintegration was released on 2 May 1989 and peaked at number three on the UK Albums Chart, the highest position the band had placed on the chart at that point. In the UK, the lead single "Lullaby" became the Cure's highest-charting hit in their home country when it reached number five. In the US, due to its appearance in the film Lost Angels, the band's American label Elektra Records released "Fascination Street" as the first single. The international follow-up single to "Lullaby", "Lovesong", became the Cure's highest-charting hit in the United States, when it reached number two on the Billboard Hot 100. The success of Disintegration was such that the March 1990 final single "Pictures of You" reached number 24 on the British charts, despite the fact that the album had been released a year earlier. Disintegration was certified silver (60,000 copies shipped) in the United Kingdom, and by 1992 had sold more than three million copies worldwide.

== Critical reception ==
Professional ratings
Review scores
Source	Rating
AllMusic	5/5 stars
Blender	4/5 stars
Chicago Tribune	3.5/4 stars
Entertainment Weekly	A
Los Angeles Times	4/5 stars
NME	9/10
Pitchfork	10/10
Rolling Stone	3.5/5 stars
The Rolling Stone Album Guide	5/5 stars
The Village Voice	C+

In a contemporary review for Rolling Stone, music critic Michael Azerrad gave the album three-and-a-half out of five stars and felt that, "while Disintegration doesn't break new ground for the band, it successfully refines what the Cure does best". He concluded, "Despite the title, Disintegration hangs together beautifully, creating and sustaining a mood of thoroughly self-absorbed gloom. If, as Smith has hinted, the Cure itself is about to disintegrate, this is a worthy summation." Melody Maker reviewer Chris Roberts dismissed the claims that Disintegration was not a miserable record and, noting the tone of the album and its lack of melody ("You'll be lucky to find a tune on here. Or a gag"), he commented that "The Cure have almost invisibly stopped making pop records". Roberts summarised the album as "challenging and claustrophobic, often poignant, often tedious. It's nearly surprising." NME praised Disintegration for its tunes, "from the first track 'Plainsong', a swaying, slow narrative, paralysing the listener with sex-poison, to Disintegration's last 'Untitled' Smith's lyrical agony of indecision is remorseless". Reviewer Barbara Ellen noted the large range of emotions in Smith's lyrics, "from deep, loving pink to an ugly, violent maroon and almost back again". Although she found the two extra tracks superfluous, Ellen hailed Disintegration as "a mindblowing and stunningly complete album". Q gave the album a three-star rating out of five, mainly comparing it to Joy Division's work. Writer Mat Snow observed: "The Cure have studied well the art of the tragic bass line, the hesitant and melancholy guitar lick, the funereal keyboard coloration". He concluded: "Disintegration is thus well-crafted [...], just don't tell me it's original". Robert Christgau of The Village Voice gave the album a "C+" grade and felt that Smith attempts to appease a larger audience by broadening "gothic clichés" and "pumping his bad faith and bad relationship into depressing moderato play-loud keyb anthems far more tedious than his endless vamps".

In a retrospective review for AllMusic, Stephen Thomas Erlewine gave Disintegration four-and-a-half out of five stars, and applauded the band by saying, "The Cure's gloomy soundscapes have rarely sounded so alluring [and] the songs – from the pulsating, ominous 'Fascination Street' to the eerie, string-laced 'Lullaby' – have rarely been so well-constructed and memorable." Erlewine went on to praise Disintegration for being "darkly seductive", and "a hypnotic, mesmerizing record". Pitchfork praised the record, admitting "Disintegration stands unquestionably as Robert Smith's magnum opus." Writer Chris Ott noted that "scant few albums released in the 1980s can boast an opener as grand as 'Plainsong', the most breathtaking, shimmering anthem the band ever recorded."

Disintegration has been included in numerous "best of" lists. In 2000 it was voted number 94 in Colin Larkin's All Time Top 1000 Albums. Rolling Stone placed the record at number 326 on its 2003 list of the "500 Greatest Albums of All Time", maintaining the ranking in the 2012 update, and raising it to number 116 in the 2020 reboot of the list. The magazine's German counterpart placed Disintegration at number 184 on the same list. The album was considered to be the best album of 1989 by Melody Maker, 17th on Q magazine's "40 Best Albums of the '80s", and 38th on Pitchfork's "Best Albums of the 80s" and 9th in the 2018 version. The album placed at number 14 in Entertainment Weekly's "New Classics: The 100 Best Albums from 1983 to 2008." In 2012, Slant Magazine listed the album at number 15 on its list of "Best Albums of the 1980s". In a 2001 article in Rolling Stone, readers selected Disintegration as number 9 in the "10 Best Albums of the Eighties". The album was also included in the book 1001 Albums You Must Hear Before You Die. Paste named the album at tenth in their list "The 50 Best New Wave Albums." In 2024, the magazine ranked Disintegration number 2 on its list of the greatest albums of all time.

In the South Park episode "Mecha-Streisand", Kyle Broflovski called it "the best album ever"; the show's creators, Trey Parker and Matt Stone, are fans of the Cure, and had got Smith to voice himself in this episode. The album plays a role in the climax of the 2015 Marvel film Ant-Man, as "Plainsong" plays when an iPhone's Siri mishears the villain, Corey Stoll's Darren Cross, saying "I'm going to disintegrate you"; director Peyton Reed said that "It's such an epic song that it transcended the joke", and that Disintegration was the second album he ever bought.

== The Prayer Tour and aftermath ==
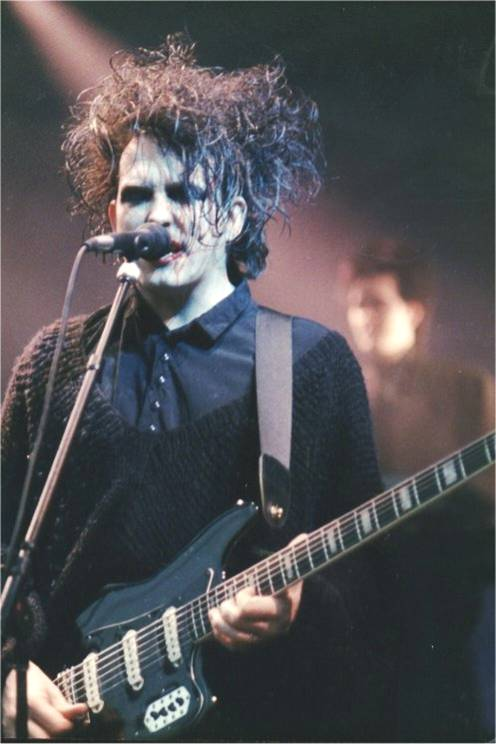
Robert Smith with the Cure during the 1989 Prayer Tour

Following completion of Disintegration, Smith noted that the Cure had "despite my best efforts, actually become everything that I didn't want us to become: a stadium rock band." Furthermore, Smith claimed the album's title was the most appropriate one he could think of: "Most of the relationship with the band outside of the band fell apart. Calling it Disintegration was kind of tempting fate, and fate retaliated. The family idea of the group really fell apart too after Disintegration. It was the end of a golden period."

The Prayer Tour began in Europe shortly after the release of the album. The band performed numerous high-profile concerts, including shows in front of more than 40,000 fans over two nights in Paris and their first performances in Eastern Europe. Following the European leg, the band elected to travel to North America for their upcoming US leg by boat, instead of plane. Smith and Gallup shared a fear of flight, and ultimately lamented the upcoming dates, wishing to reduce the number of concerts they booked. The record label and tour promoters strongly disagreed, and even proposed to add several new shows to the itinerary because of the success of Disintegration in the US. The first concert in the United States was at New Jersey's Giants Stadium, where 44,000 people attended; 30,000 tickets were purchased on the first day alone. Pixies and Love and Rockets were the special guests on the biggest concerts of that tour, in addition to the support act Shelleyan Orphan which was present on all the dates. The Cure were extremely displeased with the massive turnout; according to O'Donnell: "We had been at sea for five days. The stadium was too big for us to take it all in. We've decided that we don't like playing stadiums that large." Smith recalls that "it was never our intention to become as big as this".

The band's show at Los Angeles's Dodger Stadium attracted roughly 50,000 attendees, grossing over US$1.5 million (equivalent to $3.9 million in 2025). The band's notably greater popularity in the United States—virtually every concert in the leg was sold out—caused Smith to break down, and threatened the band's future: "It's reached a stage where I personally can't cope with it," he said, "so I've decided this is the last time we're gonna tour." Backstage, there were ongoing feuds between band members owing to the strife caused by Smith. He recalled that towards the end of the tour "I was tearing my hair out ... It was just a difficult tour." Cocaine use was prevalent, and it only ended up distancing Smith from his fellow band members.

Upon returning to the United Kingdom in early October, Smith wanted nothing more to do with recording, promoting and touring for an album. In 1990, "Lullaby" won Best Music Video of 1989 at the Brit Awards. The Cure also released a live album titled Entreat (1991), which compiled songs entirely off Disintegration from their performance at Wembley Arena, and despite claims that the Cure would never tour again, Smith accepted an invitation to headline the Glastonbury Festival. O'Donnell, after two years with the group, left to pursue a solo career, and was replaced by the band's guitar technician Perry Bamonte. Smith, who was influenced by the acid house movement that had exploded in London that summer, released a predominantly electronic remix album, Mixed Up, in 1990.

== Track listing ==
All lyrics are written by Robert Smith; all music is composed by Smith, Simon Gallup, Roger O'Donnell, Porl Thompson, Boris Williams.

Disintegration track listing
No.	Title	Length
1.	"Plainsong"	5:17
2.	"Pictures of You"	7:28
3.	"Closedown"	4:18
4.	"Lovesong"	3:29
5.	"Last Dance"	4:45
6.	"Lullaby"	4:09
7.	"Fascination Street"	5:16
8.	"Prayers for Rain"	6:08
9.	"The Same Deep Water as You"	9:22
10.	"Disintegration"	8:19
11.	"Homesick"	7:07
12.	"Untitled"	6:33

- UK Polydor CD and cassette copies of Disintegration listed "Last Dance" and "Homesick" as bonus tracks, as they were not included on the original vinyl issue of the album in any country. Vinyl reissues of the album 2010-onwards were expanded to double LPs and include these tracks.

=== 2010 Deluxe reissue ===
Disc 2: Rarities 1988 - 1989
No.	Title	Length
1.	"Prayers For Rain" (Robert Smith home demo – Instrumental – 4/88)	3:01
2.	"Pictures of You" (Robert Smith home demo – Instrumental – 4/88)	3:29
3.	"Fascination Street" (Robert Smith home demo – Instrumental – 4/88)	2:39
4.	"Homesick" (Band Rehearsal – Instrumental – 6/88)	3:12
5.	"Fear of Ghosts" (Band Rehearsal – Instrumental – 6/88)	2:57
6.	"Noheart" (Band Rehearsal – Instrumental – 6/88)	2:39
7.	"Esten" (Band Demo – Instrumental – 9/88)	3:13
8.	"Closedown" (Band Demo – Instrumental – 9/88)	2:48
9.	"Lovesong" (Band Demo – Instrumental – 9/88)	3:39
10.	"2Late" (Alternate Version, Band Demo – Instrumental – 9/88)	2:50
11.	"The Same Deep Water As You" (Band Demo – Instrumental – 9/88)	6:04
12.	"Disintegration" (Band Demo – Instrumental – 9/88)	6:34
13.	Untitled (Alternate Version, Studio Rough – Instrumental – 11/88)	3:37
14.	"Babble" (Alternate Version, Studio Rough – Instrumental – 11/88)	2:58
15.	"Plainsong" (Studio Rough – Guide Vocal – 11/88)	4:44
16.	"Last Dance" (Studio Rough – Guide Vocal – 11/88)	4:41
17.	"Lullaby" (Studio Rough – Guide Vocal – 11/88)	3:46
18.	"Out of Mind" (Studio Rough – Guide Vocal – 11/88)	2:58
19.	"Delirious Night" (Rough Mix – Vocal – 12/88)	4:30
20.	"Pirate Ships" (Robert Smith solo – Rough Mix – Vocal – 12/89)	3:38

Disc three: Entreat Plus – Live at Wembley 1989
No.	Title	Length
1.	"Plainsong"	5:19
2.	"Pictures of You"	7:04
3.	"Closedown"	4:21
4.	"Lovesong"	3:24
5.	"Last Dance"	4:36
6.	"Lullaby"	4:14
7.	"Fascination Street"	5:09
8.	"Prayers For Rain"	4:49
9.	"The Same Deep Water As You"	10:03
10.	"Disintegration"	7:54
11.	"Homesick"	6:46
12.	Untitled	6:44

== Personnel ==
The Cure

- Robert Smith – guitars, vocals, keyboards, Bass VI
- Simon Gallup – bass, keyboards
- Porl Thompson – guitars
- Boris Williams – drums, percussion
- Roger O'Donnell – keyboards
- Lol Tolhurst – "other instrument"

Production

- Robert Smith – production, engineering
- David M. Allen – production, engineering
- Richard Sullivan – engineering
- Roy Spong – engineering

== Charts ==
=== Weekly charts ===
1989 weekly chart performance for Disintegration
Chart (1989)	Peak position
Australian Albums (ARIA)	9
Austrian Albums (Ö3 Austria)	5
Belgian Albums (IFPI)	2
Canada Top Albums/CDs (RPM)	22
Dutch Albums (Album Top 100)	3
European Albums (Music & Media)	4
Finnish Albums (Suomen virallinen lista)	16
French Albums (IFOP)	3
German Albums (Offizielle Top 100)	2
Irish Albums (IFPI)	2
Italian Albums (Musica e dischi)	7
New Zealand Albums (RMNZ)	6
Norwegian Albums (VG-lista)	7
Spanish Albums (AFYVE)	4
Swedish Albums (Sverigetopplistan)	10
Swiss Albums (Schweizer Hitparade)	4
UK Albums (Official Charts)	3
US Billboard 200	12

Weekly chart performance for Disintegration (2010 deluxe edition)
Chart (2010)	Peak position
Belgian Albums (Ultratop Flanders)	84
Belgian Albums (Ultratop Wallonia)	41
French Albums (SNEP)	90
German Albums (Offizielle Top 100)	61
Irish Albums (IRMA)	78
Italian Albums (FIMI)	47
Mexican Albums (Top 100 Mexico)	98
Scottish Albums (Official Charts)	76
UK Albums (Official Charts)	68
US Billboard 200	92
US Top Catalog Albums (Billboard)	4
US Indie Store Album Sales (Billboard)	10

2022 weekly chart performance for Disintegration
Chart (2022)	Peak position
Greek Albums (IFPI)	1

=== Year-end charts ===
Year-end chart performance for Disintegration
Chart (1989)	Position
Australian Albums (ARIA)	69
Austrian Albums (Ö3 Austria)	18
Dutch Albums (Album Top 100)	59
European Albums (Music & Media)	15
German Albums (Offizielle Top 100)	13
US Billboard 200	35

== Certifications and sales ==
Certifications and sales for Disintegration
Region	Certification	Certified units/sales
France (SNEP)	2× Gold	200,000^{*}
Germany (BVMI)	Gold	250,000^{^}
Italy (FIMI) Sales since 2009	Platinum	50,000^{‡}
New Zealand (RMNZ)	Platinum	15,000^{‡}
Spain (Promusicae)	Platinum	100,000^{^}
Switzerland (IFPI Switzerland)	Gold	25,000^{^}
United Kingdom (BPI)	Gold	100,000^{^}
United States (RIAA)	2× Platinum	2,000,000^{^}
Summaries
Europe	—	1,000,000
Worldwide	—	4,000,000
^{*} Sales figures based on certification alone.^{^} Shipments figures based on certification alone.^{‡} Sales+streaming figures based on certification alone.

== See also ==
- List of 1989 albums
- List of 1980s albums considered the best

== Bibliography ==
- Apter, Jeff (2005). Never Enough: The Story of the Cure. Omnibus Press. ISBN 978-0-8256-7340-5.
