= The Thieves Banquet =

Studio album by Akala
- Released: 27 May 2013
- Recorded: 2012
- Genre: Hip hop, R&B
- Length: 57:53
- Label: Illa State Records

Akala chronology
DoubleThink (2010)	The Thieves Banquet (2013)	Knowledge Is Power II (2015)

Singles from The Thieves Banquet
- 1. "Lose Myself" Released: 20 May 2013; 2. "Malcolm Said It" Released: 20 May 2013

Professional ratings
Review scores
Source	Rating
The Observer	4/5 stars
Hit The Floor Magazine	4.5/5 stars

The Thieves Banquet is the fourth album from hip hop artist Akala. It was released on 27 May 2013 by Illa State Records.

== Track listing ==
- All lyrics written by Akala

No.	Title	Producer(s)	Length
1.	"Let It All Happen"	Lavar Bullard & Kingslee Daley	5:28
2.	"Lose Myself" (featuring Josh Osho)	Anthony Marshall	3:12
3.	"Another Reason" (featuring Megan Quashie)	Lavar Bullard & Kingslee Daley	4:48
4.	"Old Soul" (featuring Asheber)	Lavar Bullard & Kingslee Daley	4:34
5.	"Malcolm Said It"	Anthony Marshall	3:21
6.	"The Thieves Banquet"	Anthony Marshall Co-Produced by Lavar Bullard & Anthony Marshall	6:46
7.	"One More Breath"	Lavar Bullard & Kingslee Daley	3:49
8.	"Pissed Off"	Lavar Bullard & Kingslee Daley	4:48
9.	"Maangamizi"	Aaron 'Pantha' Cowan Co-Produced by Lavar Bullard	6:27
10.	"Our Way, the Way" (featuring Ayanna Witter-Johnson)	Lavar Bullard & Kingslee Daley	4:58
11.	"A Game Named Life" (featuring Mai Khalil)	Lavar Bullard & Kingslee Daley	4:18
12.	"The Thieves Banquet, Part 2" (Bonus Track)	Lavar Bullard & Kingslee Daley	5:16

== Personnel ==
Credits are adapted from the album's liner notes.

- Anthony Dorment, Niomi Daley – Executive-Producer
- Kingslee Daley – Producer (tracks: 1, 3, 4, 7, 8, 10, 11, 12)
- Lavar Bullard – Producer (tracks: 1, 3, 4, 7, 8, 10, 11, 12) Co-producer (tracks: 6, 9)
- Anthony Marshall – Producer (tracks: 2, 5) Co-producer (tracks: 6)
- Aaron 'Pantha' Cowan – Producer (tracks: 9)
- Artwork – Tokio Aoyama
- Design – Rob Dobrowolsky
