= Last Dance (The Cure song) =

Song by the Cure

from the album Disintegration
- Released: 2 May 1989
- Genre: Gothic rock
- Length: 4:42
- Label: Fiction
- Songwriters: Robert Smith; Simon Gallup; Porl Thompson; Boris Williams; Roger O'Donnell; Lol Tolhurst
- Producers: David M. Allen; Robert Smith

"Last Dance" is a song by English rock band the Cure. It is the fifth song on the band's eight studio album Disintegration (1989), though it was omitted on the original vinyl releases of the album alongside "Homesick", due to spacing issues. Both songs were called bonus tracks on CD releases by Elektra at the time of release, and were included on all vinyl pressing from the 2010 reissue onwards due to the album being released as a double vinyl.

== Composition and themes ==
Many critics have acknowledged the songs themes of ageing, with Albumism saying it drew "attention to the passage of time and how that can shape a relationship" which is a recurring theme on the album. Ed Jupp of God Is In The TV called it a "heartbreaking track" which "deals with a childhood love that does not survive into adulthood". Ned Raggett, writing for The Quietus, said it "ached with memories of fleeting happiness".

Frontman Robert Smith said the song was about "someone that you meet and you haven’t seen for a long time. And you used to have very strong feelings for and you don't anymore, you suddenly realise… it's a horrible sensation" Classic Pop said the highlights of the song were its "[e]pic melancholy, sweeping synths and a big snare sound", while addressing its themes as Smith recounting "a heartfelt tale of an imploding relationship, against the backdrop of winter". Billboard described the song's narrative as "Smith and his beloved are in the winter of their relationship, and after years together, the good times aren't so good anymore" referring to the lyric "But Christmas falls late now, flatter and colder" and said "a chill runs through the music, as those shimmering guitars heard on previous cuts turn suddenly shrill." Far Out cited Simon Gallup's bass line as "easily the best" moment of the song, saying it "switches between high plucked notes and low growls".

Just before the final verse, Smith whispers the line “Your name like ice into my heart”, which are directly lifted from the song "Cold" from the band's fourth studio album Pornography (1982). Paste liked this addition and felt whole the song "really captures the sting of connections that leave you at a loss when they are no longer around".

== Legacy ==
The song was covered by American hardcore band Neck for the tribute album Disintegrated - A Cure Tribute Compilation (2000). The song was also covered by Stolearm.

== Personnel ==
- Robert Smith – guitars, vocals, keyboards, six string bass
- Simon Gallup – bass, keyboards
- Porl Thompson – guitars
- Boris Williams – drums, percussion
- Roger O'Donnell – keyboards
- Lol Tolhurst – other instruments
