= Lullaby (The Cure song) =

1989 single by the Cure

Single by the Cure

from the album Disintegration
- B-side: "Babble"; "Out of Mind"
- Released: 10 April 1989
- Genre: Gothic rock
- Length: 4:10
- Label: Fiction
- Composers: Robert Smith; Simon Gallup; Porl Thompson; Roger O'Donnell; Boris Williams
- Lyricist: Robert Smith
- Producers: Robert Smith; Dave Allen

The Cure singles chronology
"Hot Hot Hot!!!" (1988)	"Lullaby" (1989)	"Fascination Street" (1989)

Music video
- "Lullaby" on YouTube

"Lullaby" is a song by English rock band the Cure and the lead single (Note: In North America, Elektra Records chose to release "Fascination Street" as the lead single for Disintegration, with "Lullaby" being released later.) from their eighth studio album, Disintegration (1989). It is co-written by Robert Smith and produced by him with Dave Allen. Released as a single on 10 April 1989 by Fiction Records, the song is the band's highest-charting single in their home country, reaching number five on the UK Singles Chart. It additionally reached number three in Ireland and West Germany while becoming a top-10 hit in several other European countries and New Zealand. The accompanying music video, directed by Tim Pope, won the British Video of the Year at the 1990 Brit Awards.

== Background ==
The meaning of "Lullaby" has been speculated by fans, including as a metonymy for addiction, depression, or sexual assault, and lead singer Robert Smith has offered multiple explanations as to its theme or content, such as childhood nightmares or abuse. One explanation by Smith follows that the song is about the disturbing songs his father sung to him as a kid, and the horrible ending they would always have. Tim Pope, a long-time collaborator of the Cure on many of its music videos, interprets "Lullaby" as an allegory for Smith's drug-addled past.

== Critical reception ==
Upon the release, a reviewer from Music & Media wrote, "Those of you who feared the worst for the Cure's artistic future after 1986's 'Why Can't I Be You?' and 'Hot Hot Hot', can stop worrying. Their new single is serious pop music at its best. The backing is a strong, infectious rhythm with subtle plucked violins and sweeping strings, completed by Robert Smith's whispering voice. Although this is not the easiest record to programme it has already become many European DJs' favourite." Jerry Smith from Music Week felt the Cure "are back in superb form with an enveloping marshmallow of a track, exuding atmosphere with soaring strings and breathy vocals. Sure to make a big impression on the charts and heighten anticipation for their new album, Disintegration." In their review of the album, People Magazine noted that the group "perks up sporadically" on songs like "Lullaby".

=== Retrospective response ===
In a 2019 retrospective review, Rayna Khaitan from Albumism wrote, "The thrillingly creepy "Lullaby" recalls a familiar sense of claustrophobia prevalent in the Cure's canon, only this time more than others, Smith seems a little intoxicated with the idea of surrender." Stephen Thomas Erlewine from AllMusic described the song as "eerie" and "string-laced". Another editor, Ned Raggett, stated that "Smith's detailing of the spiderman coming along to envelope [sic] and devour is classically Cure, while the tight, haunted-house vibe of the song is another winner."

== Chart performance ==
Upon its release, "Lullaby" became the Cure's highest-charting hit in their home country when it reached number five on the UK Singles Chart. It remains their only single to reach the top five in the United Kingdom. In Ireland, "Lullaby" became the band's third top-10 hit and highest-charting single, reaching number three. The song also reached the top 10 in Italy, Luxembourg, the Netherlands, New Zealand, Norway, and West Germany. In North America, the song was released as the third single from Disintegration instead ("Fascination Street" was the first), but did not match its predecessor's level of success, only reaching number 74 on the Billboard Hot 100 and number 23 on the Billboard Modern Rock Chart.

== Music video ==
The music video for "Lullaby" was filmed at a sound stage in London, England. It features Robert in bed, in a dream sequence, and the rest of the band playing tin soldiers who sporadically appear throughout the music video for a few seconds. The music video, during which Smith plays both the cannibalistic "spiderman" mentioned in the lyrics and his intended victim, concludes with Smith being swallowed by what appears to be a giant spider.

The music video, directed by Tim Pope and edited by Peter Goddard, won British Video of the Year at the 1990 Brit Awards.

== Track listing ==
The US-only single "Fascination Street" included the B-sides from the UK release of "Lullaby". Therefore, the US release needed some new B-sides. The two live cuts, "Homesick" and "Untitled", are from the limited edition live album Entreat, which was recorded during the Disintegration Tour. The song was remixed for single release, giving it more of an electronic feel.

- 7-inch: Fiction / FICS 29 (UK)
1. "Lullaby" (remix) – 4:08
2. "Babble" – 4:16
- 7-inch: Elektra / 7-69249 (US)
1. "Lullaby" (remix)
2. "Homesick" (live version)

* also released on cassette (9 46924-9)

- 12-inch: Fiction / ficsx 29 (UK)
1. "Lullaby" (extended remix)
2. "Babble"
3. "Out of Mind"
- 12-inch: Elektra / 0 66664 (US)
1. "Lullaby" (extended remix)
2. "Homesick" (live version)
3. "Untitled" (live version)
- CD: Fiction / ficcd 29 (UK)
1. "Lullaby" (remix)
2. "Babble"
3. "Out of Mind"
4. "Lullaby" (extended remix)

* gatefold 3" CD

- CD: Elektra / 9 66664-2 (US)
1. "Lullaby" (remix)
2. "Lullaby" (extended remix)
3. "Homesick" (live version)
4. "Untitled" (live version)

== Personnel ==
- Robert Smith – vocals, six-string bass, keyboards
- Simon Gallup – bass guitar
- Porl Thompson – guitar
- Boris Williams – drums, percussion
- Roger O'Donnell – keyboards
- Lol Tolhurst – "other instruments" (Tolhurst does not actually play on the record.)
- Mark Saunders – remix

== Charts ==
=== Weekly charts ===
Chart (1989)	Peak position
Australia (ARIA)	28
Austria (Ö3 Austria Top 40)	5
Belgium (Ultratop 50 Flanders)	15
Europe (Eurochart Hot 100)	7
Finland (Suomen virallinen lista)	17
France (SNEP)	22
Ireland (IRMA)	3
Italy (Musica e dischi)	5
Italy Airplay (Music & Media)	3
Luxembourg (Radio Luxembourg)	3
Netherlands (Dutch Top 40)	9
Netherlands (Single Top 100)	8
New Zealand (Recorded Music NZ)	7
Norway (VG-lista)	5
Spain (AFYVE)	4
Switzerland (Schweizer Hitparade)	14
UK Singles (Official Charts)	5
US Billboard Hot 100	74
US Alternative Airplay (Billboard)	23
US Dance Club Songs (Billboard)	31
West Germany (GfK)	3

=== Year-end charts ===
Chart (1989)	Position
Austria (Ö3 Austria Top 40)	25
Europe (Eurochart Hot 100)	27
Netherlands (Dutch Top 40)	98
Netherlands (Single Top 100)	90
West Germany (Media Control)	12

== Certifications ==
Region	Certification	Certified units/sales
Italy (FIMI)	Gold	25,000^{‡}
New Zealand (RMNZ)	Platinum	30,000^{‡}
United Kingdom (BPI) Sales since 2004	Gold	400,000^{‡}
^{‡} Sales+streaming figures based on certification alone.

== Other versions ==
Lullaby
Sample of Lullaby

An extended mix appears on the Cure's 1990 remix album Mixed Up.

The song has been sampled by various artists, including Just Jack in the song "Snowflakes" for his 2002 album The Outer Marker, Rachel Stevens in the song "It's All About Me" from her 2005 album Come and Get It, Sono in the song "Someday" from the 2007 album Panoramic View, and by metalcore outfit Motionless In White, in the song "Black Damask (The Fog), for their 2012 album Infamous. It was also sampled by hip hop artist Akala in the song "I Don't Know" on his 2007 album Freedom Lasso. It has been covered by British post-punk revival band Editors on the compilation Radio 1: Established 1967. Editors' version reappeared on Pictures of You – a tribute to Godlike Geniuses The Cure, which came with the 28 February 2009 issue of NME. "'Lullaby' is the greatest dark pop song... possibly of all years," said bassist Russell Leetch.

It was heavily sampled on the 2007 Faithless track "Spiders, Crocodiles & Kryptonite", which featured on their album To All New Arrivals. Smith provided a new recording of the part of "Lullaby"'s verses, greatly increasing their clarity compared with mix of the original Cure recording.

"Lullaby" was played live during Page & Plant's 1995 No Quarter Tour; the duo's backing band included Porl Thompson on guitar.

== In popular culture ==
The track was used as the backing to the trailer to the TV show The Secret Circle and was featured in the British TV shows Misfits, Fresh Meat, Being Human, as well as Episode 7 of American Horror Story: Hotel.
