= It's Not a Rumour =

Studio album by Akala
- Released: 24 April 2006
- Recorded: 2006
- Genre: Hip hop, grime, rap rock
- Length: 44:50
- Label: Illa State Records

Akala chronology
It's Not a Rumour (2006)	Freedom Lasso (2007)

Singles from It's Not a Rumour
- 1. "Roll Wid Us" Released: 16 May 2005; 2. "Bullshit" Released: 24 October 2005; 3. "The Edge (featuring Niara)" Released: 10 April 2006; 4. "Shakespeare" Released: 3 July 2006

Professional ratings
Review scores
Source	Rating
BBC	(favourable)
musicomh	4/5 stars
rapreviews	(8.5/10)

It's Not a Rumour is the debut studio album by English rapper Akala, released on 24 April 2006 on Illa State Records.

== Track listing ==
#	Title	Featured guest(s)	Producer(s)	Length
1	"Stand Up"		Blak Jack	3:40
2	"Yeah Yeah Yeah"		Reza Safinia	3:51
3	"The Edge"	Niara	Reza Safinia	3:15
4	"Shakespeare"		Reza Safinia	4:37
5	"Carried Away"		Reza Safinia	3:35
6	"This Is London"		Daniel Langsman Additional Production by Reza Safinia	3:21
7	"Bullshit"		Reza Safinia	3:18
8	"Roll Wid Us"		Dash	4:08
9	"Cold"		Reza Safinia Co-Produced by Ari Gold	3:19
10	"Hold Your Head Up"	Selah	Danny Langsman	3:22
11	"Why Do"	Ms. Dynamite	Reza Safinia	4:05
12	"The Edge (Mikey J Remix)"		Mikey J	4:21

== Singles chart positions ==
Year	Song	Chart positions
Year	Song	UK Single Chart
2005	"Roll Wid Us"	#72
