= DoubleThink =

Studio album by Akala
- Released: 3 May 2010
- Recorded: 2009/2010
- Genre: Hip hop, electro, alternative rock
- Length: 62:08
- Label: Illa State Records

Akala chronology
Freedom Lasso (2007)	DoubleThink (2010)	The Thieves Banquet (2013)

Singles from DoubleThink
- 1. "XXL" Released: 19 April 2010; 2. "Yours and My Children" Released: 18 October 2010; 3. "Find No Enemy" Released: 31 March 2011

Professional ratings
Review scores
Source	Rating
soulculture	4/5 stars
spudnikmusic	4/5 stars
LIME Magazine	4/5 stars

DoubleThink is the third album from hip hop artist Akala. It was released on 3 May 2010 by Illa State Records. The title refers to doublethink, a plot element in George Orwell's dystopian novel, Nineteen Eighty-Four. Akala noted this novel, Aldous Huxley’s Brave New World and Yevgeny Zamyatin’s We as stimulus for the album's dystopian qualities.

== Track listing ==
No.	Title	Length
1.	"Intro"	1:09
2.	"Welcome to Dystopia"	3:49
3.	"Faceless People"	3:23
4.	"Marathon Man"	3:40
5.	"Psychosis" (Interlude)	0:27
6.	"Psycho"	4:12
7.	"XXL"	3:53
8.	"I Don't Need"	2:37
9.	"Thick Skin"	3:28
10.	"Peace"	1:58
11.	"Yours and My Children"	4:23
12.	"Find No Enemy"	5:46
13.	"Tree Without Root" (Interlude)	1:03
14.	"What Is Real" (featuring illAudio)	5:24
15.	"Face Down"	4:35
16.	"God?"	3:53
17.	"It's Not That Serious"	4:53
18.	"Outro"	3:46
19.	"Can U Tell Me" (Bonus Track)	4:57
