= Pictures of You (The Cure song) =

1990 single by the Cure

Single by the Cure

from the album Disintegration
- Released: 19 March 1990
- Genre: Gothic rock; synth-rock; synth-pop; alternative rock
- Length: 7:29 (album version); 4:48 (7-inch)
- Label: Fiction
- Composers: Robert Smith; Simon Gallup; Porl Thompson; Roger O'Donnell; Boris Williams; Lol Tolhurst
- Lyricist: Robert Smith
- Producers: Robert Smith; Dave Allen

The Cure singles chronology
"Lovesong" (1989)	"Pictures of You" (1990)	"Never Enough" (1990)

Music video
- "Pictures of You" on YouTube

"Pictures of You" is a song by English rock band the Cure. It was released on 19 March 1990 by Fiction Records as the fourth and final single from the band's eighth studio album, Disintegration (1989). The song has a single version which is a shorter edit of the album version. The single reached No. 24 on the UK Singles Chart.

There are also two different remixes on two UK 12-inch singles, and other singles released around the world, one of which later appeared on Mixed Up as the Extended Dub Mix and differs significantly from the album version in arrangement in that incorporates wholly original drum and bass arrangements. The other is an extended remix of the original album version which, at 7:59, runs slightly longer than the album version. There is also an edit which was released on 12-inch in the US, titled "extended remix" as in the European and Australasian releases, but which runs for 6:40 rather than 7:59.

In 2011, the song was voted number 283 on Rolling Stone's "The 500 Greatest Songs of All Time" list. In 2019, Billboard ranked the song number nine on their list of the 40 greatest Cure songs, and in 2023, Mojo ranked the song number 11 on their list of the 30 greatest Cure songs.

== Background ==
According to interviews, the inspiration of the song came when a fire broke loose in Robert Smith's home. After that day, Smith was going through the remains and came across his wallet which had pictures of his wife, Mary. The cover of the single is one of the pictures. The same picture was used as the cover of the "Charlotte Sometimes" single, but that image was heavily warped and distorted.

The song is composed in the key of A major.

== Music video ==
The Tim Pope–directed video was shot using three Super-8 cameras at the foot of Buachaille Etive Mòr in Glencoe, Scotland, during the February 1990 "week of the big snow", with Robert Smith mentioning that he had never been colder before.

== Notable cover versions ==
- A version by Angie Hart was used for a Transport Accident Commission ad campaign aimed at combatting speeding drivers.

== Track listing ==
7-inch single (1)

1. "Pictures of You" (Remix) – 4:46
2. "Last Dance" (live) – 4:42

7-inch single (2)

1. "Pictures of You" (Remix) – 4:46
2. "Prayers for Rain" (live) – 4:48

12-inch single (1)

1. "Pictures of You" (Extended version) – 8:07
2. "Last Dance" (live) – 4:41
3. "Fascination Street" (live) – 5:23

12-inch single (2)

1. "Pictures of You" (Strange mix) – 6:45
2. "Prayers for Rain" (live) – 4:48
3. "Disintegration" (live) – 7:54

CD single

1. "Pictures of You" (Remix) – 4:46
2. "Last Dance" (live) – 4:45
3. "Fascination Street" (live) – 5:19
4. "Prayers for Rain" (live) – 4:48
5. "Disintegration" (live) – 7:54

CD single (2)

1. "Pictures of You" (Remix) – 4:46
2. "Last Dance" (live) – 4:45
3. "Fascination Street" (live) – 5:19

== Charts ==
Chart (1990)	Peak position
Australia (ARIA)	89
Europe (Eurochart Hot 100)	51
Germany (GfK)	18
Ireland (IRMA)	9
Netherlands (Single Top 100)	77
UK Singles (Official Charts)	24
US Billboard Hot 100	71
US Alternative Airplay (Billboard)	19
US Cash Box Top 100	67

== Certifications ==
Region	Certification	Certified units/sales
New Zealand (RMNZ)	Gold	15,000^{‡}
United Kingdom (BPI)	Silver	200,000^{‡}
^{‡} Sales+streaming figures based on certification alone.

== Personnel ==
- Robert Smith – vocals, Bass VI, keyboards, producer
- Porl Thompson – guitar
- Simon Gallup – bass
- Boris Williams – drums
- Roger O'Donnell – keyboards
- Lol Tolhurst – credited with "other instruments"; does not actually play on this track
