= Akala (rapper) =

British rapper, journalist, author, and activist

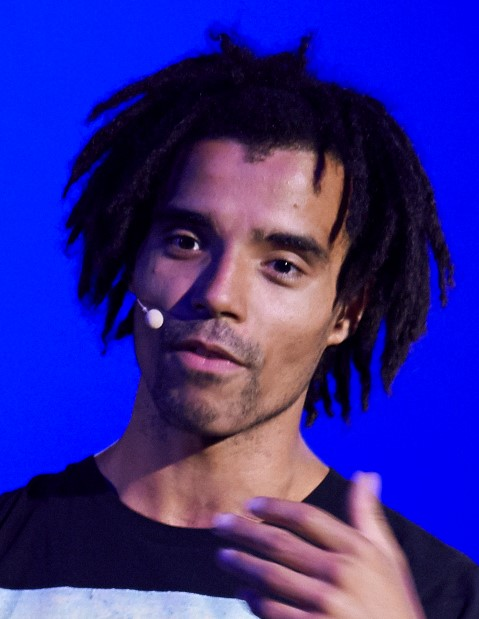
- Akala in 2014

Background information
- Born: Kingslee James McLean Daley; 1 December 1983 (age 42); Crawley, West Sussex, England
- Origin: Kentish Town, London, England
- Genre: British hip hop
- Occupations: Rapper, writer and activist
- Works: Akala discography
- Years active: 2003–present
- Label: Immovable Ltd (Illa State Records)
- Website: akalamusic.com

Kingslee James McLean Daley (born 1 December 1983), known professionally as Akala, is a British rapper, writer and activist. In 2006, he was voted the Best Hip Hop Act at the MOBO Awards and has been included on the annual Powerlist of the 100 most influential Black British people in the UK, most recently making the 2021 edition.

== Early life and education ==
Daley was born in Crawley, in 1983 to a Scottish mother and Jamaican father who separated before he was born, and grew up with his mother in Kentish Town. He has recalled the day he realised that his mother was white, and was embarrassed by her whiteness. His mother had educated him about black history and introduced him to radical black thinkers, yet there would always remain a racial dimension to those relationships. Daley's older sister is rapper Ms. Dynamite.

His stepfather was a stage manager at the Hackney Empire theatre, and he often visited it before his teens. His mother enrolled him in a pan-African Saturday school, about which he states "I benefited massively from a specifically black community-led self-education tradition that we don't talk about very much because it doesn't fit with the image [of black families]". When accepting honorary degrees, he thanked "the entire Caribbean pan-African community that helped me through school and encouraged an intellectual curiosity and self development from a very young age."

At age six, Daley's state primary school put him in a special needs group for pupils with learning difficulties and English as a second language. He attended Acland Burghley School for secondary education. Daley saw a friend attacked with a meat cleaver to the skull when he was 12, and carried a knife himself for a period. He went on to achieve ten GCSEs and took maths a year early. He has said he "was in the top 1 per cent of GCSEs in the country. [I] got 100 per cent in [my] English exam." As a teenager, Daley focused on football, being on the schoolboy books of both West Ham United and AFC Wimbledon, and dropped out of college. He is a fan of Arsenal. Daley did not attend university, but has said he often envies those who do.

Daley has two honorary degrees in recognition of his educational work. On 23 June 2018, he received an honorary doctorate from Oxford Brookes University as a Doctor of Art. On 31 July 2018, he received an honorary degree from Brighton University.

== Musical career ==
=== 2003–2009: Early years and breakthrough ===
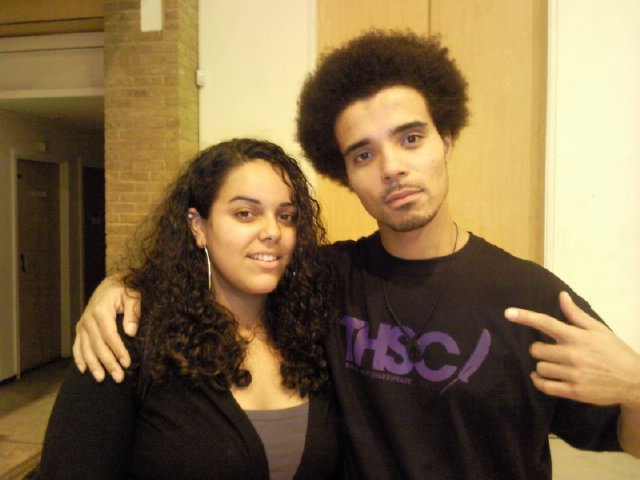
Akala (right) in 2009.

Daley got his stage name from Acala, a Buddhist term for "immovable", and started releasing music in 2003 from his own independent music label, Illa State Records. He released his first mixtape, The War Mixtape, in 2004.

In 2006, he released his first album, It's Not a Rumour. This proved to be his breakthrough album, containing the single "Shakespeare" (a reference to his self-proclaimed title "The Black Shakespeare") which made the BBC Radio 1 playlist. His work was recognised with the MOBO Award for Best Hip Hop Act. Additionally in 2006, a mixtape, A Little Darker, was released under the name "Illa State", featuring Akala and his sister, Ms. Dynamite, as well as cameo appearances by many other artists.

Daley appeared for a live session on BBC Radio 1Xtra where he was challenged to come up with a rap containing as many Shakespeare play titles as he could manage, he wrote and performed a minute-long rap containing 27 different Shakespeare play titles in under half an hour and later recorded these lyrics in the studio and turned it into the single "Comedy Tragedy History".

In 2007, Daley released his second album, Freedom Lasso, containing the "Comedy Tragedy History" track. The song "Love in my Eyes" heavily sampled Siouxsie and the Banshees' song "Love in a void" with the voice of Siouxsie Sioux. In 2008, The War Mixtape Vol. 2 was released, along with an EP of acoustic remixes.

=== 2010–present: Doublethink, Knowledge Is Power, and beyond ===
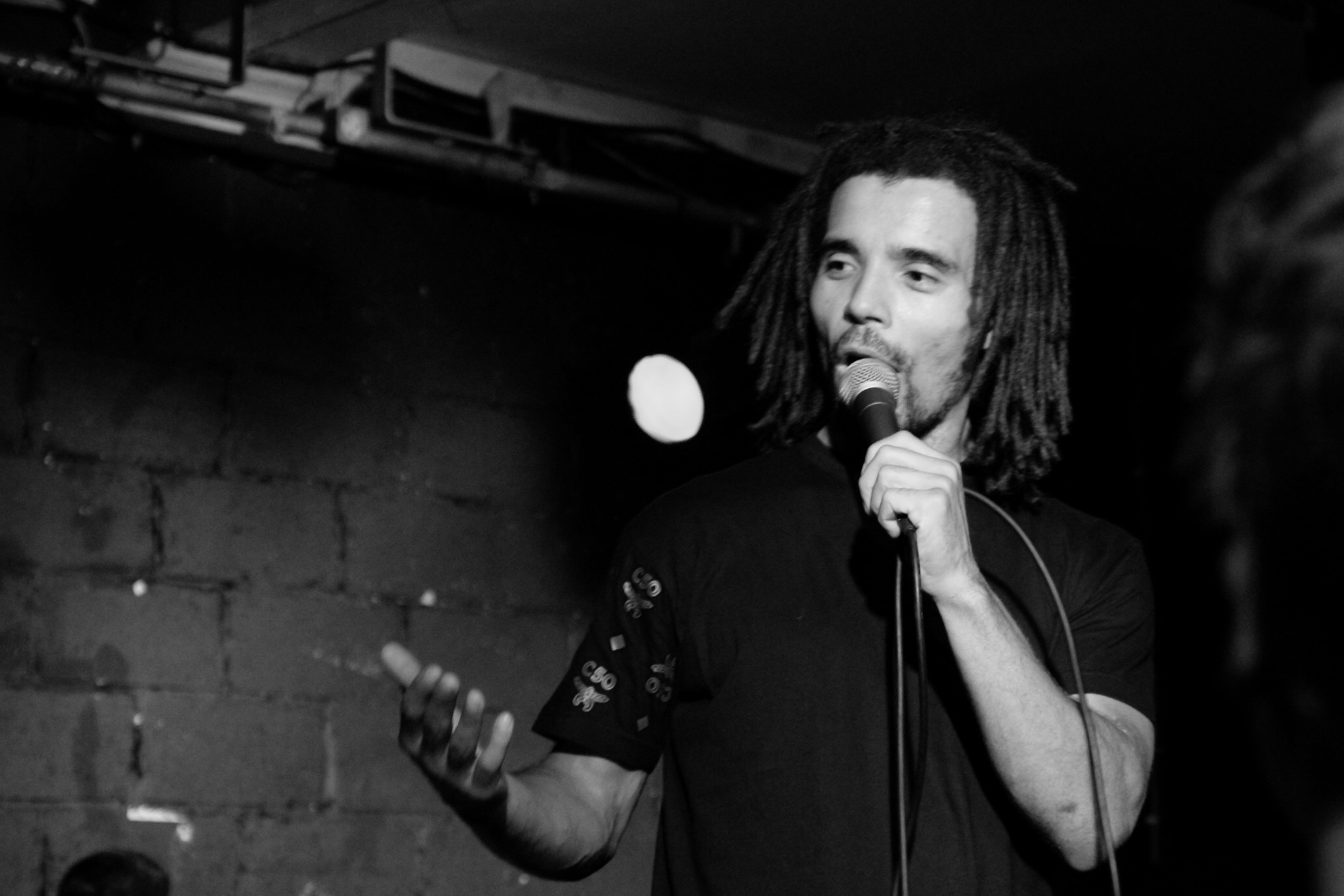
Akala at the Hull Jazz Festival 2015.

Daley's third studio album, DoubleThink, was released in 2010, and holds a strong theme of George Orwell's popular novel Nineteen Eighty-Four. DoubleThink contains tracks such as "Find No Enemy" and "Yours and My Children" detailing some of the sights he saw on his trip to Brazil. In November 2010, Daley headlined a live performance at the British Library, to launch the "Evolving English" exhibition and featured performances by British poet Zena Edwards, comedian Doc Brown and British rapper Lowkey which also included Daley taking part in a hip hop panel discussion alongside Saul Williams, U.S professor M. K. Asante and Lowkey. Daley appeared on Charlie Sloth's show on Radio 1Xtra on 18 July 2011, performing "Fire in the Booth", and after the great reception it received he returned again in May 2012 and provided "Part 2".

In May 2012, Daley released a two-part mixtape, Knowledge Is Power, containing "Fire in the Booth", and followed the release with a promotional tour in the autumn of 2012. In March 2013, Daley announced via his social media feeds that his fourth album would be released in May 2013, pushing back the future EP The Ruin of Empires to later in 2013. His fourth album, The Thieves Banquet, was released on 27 May 2013, including the songs "Malcolm Said It", "Maangamizi" and "Lose Myself" (feat. Josh Osho).

=== Live performances ===
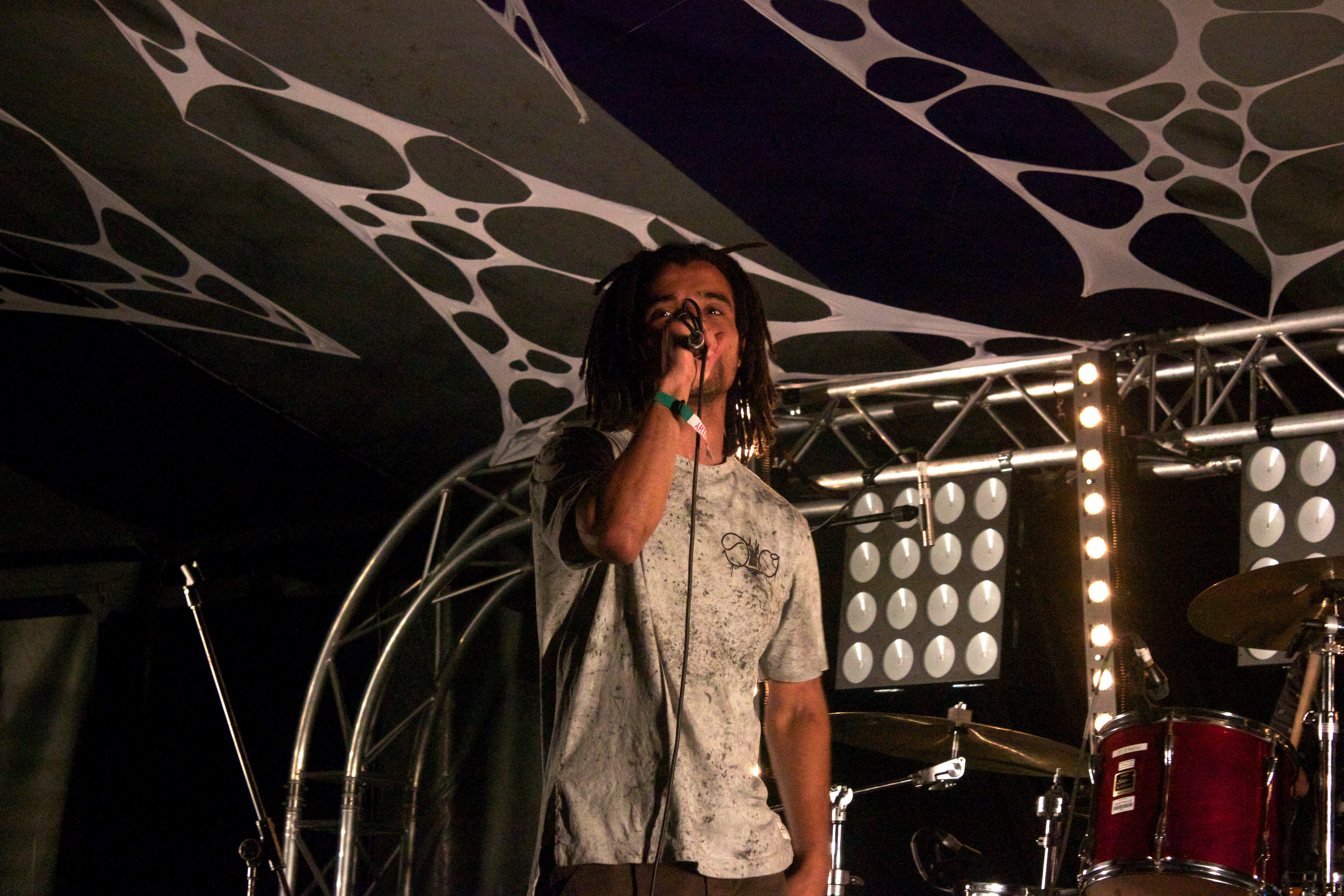
Akala performing at Blissfields 2015.

In 2007, Daley was the first hip hop artist to perform his own headline concert in Vietnam. He has performed at various U.K. festivals, including V Festival, Wireless, Glastonbury, Reading and Leeds Festivals, Parklife, Secret Garden Party and Isle of Wight, and has supported artists such as Christina Aguilera, MIA, Richard Ashcroft, Audiobullys, DJ Shadow, The Gotan Project and Scratch Perverts on their U.K/European tours.

In 2008, Daley featured at the South by Southwest music festival in Texas and in 2010 he toured the UK with Nas and Damian Marley on the "Distant Relatives" tour, which included the British rapper Ty.

In November 2010, Daley embarked on his own headline tour of the UK, with 20 dates overall. He was present at the "One Love:No Borders Hip Hop" event held in Birmingham, England in April 2011, with Iron Braydz from London, Lowkey, Logic and other up-and-coming UK artists. In August 2012, he performed at the Outlook Festival and in November 2012, he performed at the second edition of NH7 Weekender music festival in Pune, India.

== Writing ==
=== Natives ===
In May 2018, Daley published Natives: Race and Class in the Ruins of Empire. The book is part biography, and part polemic on race and class. The overall ideological framework of the book is a pragmatic, socialist-oriented Pan-Africanism that claims to seek the liberation of all humanity from oppression and exploitation. At the same time, Daley highlights what he believes are shared problems faced by African communities worldwide in what he describes as a global system of imperialism.

Daley attributes his escape from poverty not to personal exceptionalism but to the vagaries and chaotic injustice of race, class and privilege. Daley asserts that Britain is not a meritocracy where the barriers of race and class can be simply overcome through hard work and perseverance. He explains his success as the absurd and unexpected consequence of an unequal system that allows the rise of a few while leaving behind the many, no matter how brilliant they are. He claims several times in the book that some of his friends could have been academics or scientists if the obstacles of what he terms 'structural racism' and 'class oppression' had not been there.

=== Visions ===
In 2016 Akala published a graphic novel/comic book called Visions. Akala's own comic deals with his interests, and references. It is a semi-autobiographical journey into magical realism, which begins with him smashing a television with a teapot, then takes us through altered states of consciousness, reincarnation, hallucinations, and themes of indigenous spiritualities and ancestral memory.

== Political views ==
In June 2016, Daley supported Labour Party leader Jeremy Corbyn after mass resignations from his shadow cabinet and a leadership challenge. He tweeted: "The way these dickhead Labour MP's [sic] are snaking @jeremycorbyn eediat ting."

In May 2017, he endorsed Corbyn in the 2017 UK general election. He wrote in The Guardian: "So why will I be voting now? Jeremy Corbyn. It's not that I am naïve enough to believe that one man (who is, of course, powerless without the people that support him) can fundamentally alter the nature of British politics, or that I think that if Labour wins that the UK will suddenly reflect his personal political convictions, or even that I believe that the prime minister actually runs the country. However, for the first time in my adult life, and perhaps for the first time in British history, someone I would consider to be a fundamentally decent human being has a chance of being elected."

In November 2019, along with 34 other musicians, Daley signed a letter endorsing Corbyn in the 2019 UK general election with a call to end austerity.

Daley acknowledges institutionalised racism: "My analysis of institutionalised racism is not 'oh, this is an excuse to fail' – quite the opposite. The earlier you're aware of the hurdles, the easier they are to jump over."

== Lectures, speeches and interviews ==
=== Lectures ===
Daley has given guest lectures at East 15 Acting School, University of Essex, Manchester Metropolitan University, Sydney University, Sheffield Hallam University, Cardiff University, and the International Slavery Museum, as well as a workshop on songwriting at the School of Oriental and African Studies. He has also spoken at the Oxford Union. He has also been involved in campaigns to "decolonise" the curriculum including giving a talk at the University of Leicester.

== Activism ==
=== The Hip-hop Shakespeare Company ===
Founded in 2009 by Daley, The Hip-hop Shakespeare Company (THSC) is a music theatre production company aimed at exploring the social, cultural and linguistic parallels between the works of William Shakespeare and that of modern day hip-hop artists.

== Discography ==
=== Albums ===
Album Information
It's Not a Rumour
- Released: 1 May 2006
- Singles: "Roll Wid Us" "Bullshit" "The Edge" "Shakespeare"
Freedom Lasso
- Released: 1 October 2007
- Singles: "Bit By Bit" "Freedom Lasso" "Electro Livin" "Comedy Tragedy History"
DoubleThink
- Released: 3 May 2010
- Singles: "XXL" "Yours and My Children" "Find No Enemy"
The Thieves Banquet
- Released: 27 May 2013
- Singles: "Lose Myself" "Malcolm Said It"
Knowledge Is Power II
- Released: 30 March 2015
- Singles: "Mr. Fire in the Booth" "Murder Runs the Globe"

=== Compilation ===
Album Information
10 Years of Akala
- Released: 23 September 2016
- Singles: "Giants"

=== EPs ===
EP Information
Acoustic Remixes - EP
- Released: 13 October 2008
Visions - EP
- Released: 28 July 2017

=== Mixtapes ===
Mixtape Information
The War Mixtape
- Released: 1 August 2004
- Singles: "Welcome to England" "War"
A Little Darker (with Ms. Dynamite)
- Released: 4 September 2006
The War Mixtape Vol. 2
- Released: 22 September 2008
Knowledge Is Power Volume 1
- Released: 28 May 2012

=== Singles ===
- "Welcome to England" (2003)
- "War" (2004)
- "Roll Wid Us" (2005) – UK No. 72
- "Bullshit" (2005)
- "The Edge" (featuring Niara) (2006)
- "Dat Boy Akala" (featuring Low Deep) (2006)
- "Shakespeare" (2006)
- "Doin' Nuffin" / "Hold Your Head Up" (2006)
- "Bit By Bit" (2007)
- "Freedom Lasso" (2007)
- "Where I'm From" (2007)
- "Comedy Tragedy History" (2008)
- "XXL" (2010)
- "Yours and My Children" (2010)
- "Find No Enemy" (2011)
- "Lose Myself" (featuring Josh Osho) (2013)
- "Mr. Fire in the Booth" (2015)
- "Giants" (featuring Kabaka Pyramid & Marshall) (2016)

== Songs used in other media ==
- The song "Roll Wid Us", was used in the 2006 British film Kidulthood.
- The song "The Edge", from It's Not A Rumour, was used in the NBA 2K10 video game.
- The song "Shakespeare" was used on a Channel 4 advert for their Street Summer.
