= Lovesong (The Cure song) =

1989 single by the Cure

Single by the Cure

from the album Disintegration
- B-side: "2 Late"; "Fear of Ghosts"
- Released: 21 August 1989
- Genre: Gothic rock; post-punk; psychedelic pop
- Length: 3:28
- Label: Fiction
- Composers: Robert Smith; Simon Gallup; Boris Williams; Porl Thompson; Roger O'Donnell; Lol Tolhurst
- Lyricist: Robert Smith
- Producers: Robert Smith; Dave Allen

The Cure singles chronology
"Fascination Street" (1989)	"Lovesong" (1989)	"Pictures of You" (1990)

Music video
- "Lovesong" on YouTube

"Lovesong" (sometimes written as "Love Song") is a song by English rock band the Cure, released as the third single from their eighth studio album, Disintegration (1989), on 21 August 1989. The song saw considerable success in the United States, where it reached the number-two position in October 1989 and became the band's only top-10 entry on the Billboard Hot 100. In the United Kingdom, the single charted at number 18, and it peaked within the top 20 in Canada and Ireland.

The song has been covered by several artists, with notable cover versions by American rock band 311, recorded for the soundtrack for the film 50 First Dates and also released as a single. This song was also performed by Adele on her 2011 album 21.

== Content ==
"Lovesong" (1989)
Sample of "Lovesong" by the Cure

The song is performed in A minor and is built around a distinctive bass riff. The verses follow an Am/G/F/Em chord progression, which changes to F/G/Am/C in the choruses. The lyrics are simple, with each verse having the same structure ("Whenever I'm alone with you / you make me feel like I am ... again"). Speaking of its simplicity and unusually upbeat nature compared to the other tracks on Disintegration, Robert Smith stated, "It's an open show of emotion. It's not trying to be clever. It's taken me ten years to reach the point where I feel comfortable singing a very straightforward love song."

The single version of the song is almost exactly the same as the album version, yet the mix differs slightly, with extra reverb and harmonies added to Smith's vocals. In addition, in the instrumental section between the first two verses, the guitar does not join the keyboards as it does on the album.

== Title ==
Similar to the title variations of the Cure song "In Between Days", there is not a universally agreed-upon spacing method of the title of "Lovesong", as it varies between "Lovesong" and "Love Song" on many official Cure releases. The original 1989 artwork for the album Disintegration uses "Love Song" on the track listing and "Lovesong" on the lyrics sheet; the revised art for the 2010 remaster of the album consistently uses "Lovesong". When released as a single in 1989, the cover artwork displayed the title as "Lovesong", while the printing on the disc itself read "Love Song" all three times. Subsequent releases of Paris and Galore both use "Lovesong" exclusively, while 2001's Greatest Hits compilation uses "Lovesong" on the track listing and "Love Song" within the liner notes. 2004's Join the Dots also uses "Lovesong" within the booklet presentation.

== Release ==
Upon release as a single, the song received worldwide success, and peaked at number two on the US Billboard Hot 100, making it the group's most successful single in the United States. The song also charted at number two on the Billboard Modern Rock Tracks chart, number 30 on the Billboard Mainstream Rock Tracks chart and number 18 on the UK Singles Chart. Smith originally wrote the song for his long-time girlfriend and then fiancée, Mary, as a wedding present.

The extended mix version of the song was included on the band's 1990 remix album Mixed Up. An instrumental demo version recorded by the band was featured on the second disk of the 2010 re-release of Disintegration. A music video featuring the band performing inside a cave was also released with the single.

== Track listings ==
7-inch single

1. "Lovesong" – 3:24
2. "2 Late" – 2:40

12-inch single

1. "Lovesong" (extended mix)
2. "2 Late"
3. "Fear of Ghosts"

CD single

1. "Lovesong" (remix) – 3:24
2. "Lovesong" (extended remix) – 6:18
3. "2 Late"
4. "Fear of Ghosts"

== Personnel ==
- Robert Smith – vocals, guitar, keyboards
- Simon Gallup – bass guitar
- Porl Thompson – guitar
- Boris Williams – drums, percussion
- Roger O'Donnell – keyboards
- Lol Tolhurst – (officially, in album credits) "other instrument"
- Mark Saunders – remix

== Charts ==
=== Weekly charts ===
Chart (1989)	Peak position
Australia (ARIA)	82
Belgium (Ultratop 50 Flanders)	38
Canada Top Singles (RPM)	10
Europe (Eurochart Hot 100)	32
Ireland (IRMA)	13
Netherlands (Dutch Top 40 Tipparade)	17
Netherlands (Single Top 100)	48
New Zealand (Recorded Music NZ)	39
UK Singles (Official Charts)	18
US Billboard Hot 100	2
US Alternative Airplay (Billboard)	2
US Dance Club Songs (Billboard)	8
US Dance Singles Sales (Billboard)	16
US Mainstream Rock Airplay (Billboard)	27
West Germany (GfK)	21

=== Year-end charts ===
Chart (1989)	Position
US Billboard Hot 100	68
US Modern Rock Tracks (Billboard)	5

== Certifications ==
Region	Certification	Certified units/sales
New Zealand (RMNZ)	Platinum	30,000^{‡}
United Kingdom (BPI) Sales since 2004	Gold	400,000^{‡}
^{‡} Sales+streaming figures based on certification alone.

== 311 version ==
"Love Song"

Single by 311

from the album 50 First Dates Soundtrack and Greatest Hits '93–'03
- Released: 13 February 2004
- Length: 3:28
- Label: Volcano
- Songwriters: Robert Smith; Simon Gallup; Boris Williams; Porl Thompson; Roger O'Donnell; Lol Tolhurst

311 singles chronology
"Beyond the Gray Sky" (2003)	"Love Song" (2004)	"First Straw" (2004)

Music video
- "Love Song" on YouTube

"Love Song" was released as a single by the band 311 and is featured on the soundtrack of the 2004 film 50 First Dates. It is also featured on 311's greatest hits album, Greatest Hits '93–'03. While the Cure's original version peaked at number two on the Alternative Songs chart, 311's cover peaked at number one. This cover also entered the Billboard Hot 100—peaking at number 59—becoming the band's only song to reach the chart. 311's cover was also successful in the adult contemporary radio market, peaking within the top ten of the Mainstream Top 40—at number seven.

=== Music video ===
The music video, directed by Mark Kohr, features 311 playing the song in a bar. While not featured in the version on YouTube, the version initially released for the song in conjunction with, and featuring footage from, 50 First Dates, features a cameo from former Cure member Lol Tolhurst as a bartender. His appearance is at 2:22 in the video.

=== Charts ===
==== Weekly charts ====
Chart (2004)	Peak position
US Billboard Hot 100	59
US Alternative Airplay (Billboard)	1
US Adult Pop Airplay (Billboard)	7

==== Year-end charts ====
Chart (2004)	Position
US Adult Top 40 (Billboard)	24

=== Certifications ===
Region	Certification	Certified units/sales
United States (RIAA)	Platinum	1,000,000^{‡}
^{‡} Sales+streaming figures based on certification alone.

== Other versions ==
American trance singer Jes has covered the song in various trance and acoustic styles, releasing her own cover version in 2009, and included in her 2010 album High Glow. The song was covered by the Brunettes for the 2008 American Laundromat Records tribute album Just Like Heaven – a tribute to The Cure. It has also been covered by the bands A Perfect Circle (as a mashup with "Diary of a Madman"), Good Charlotte, the Deluxtone Rockets, Jack Off Jill, Snake River Conspiracy, Azam Ali/Niyaz, Death Cab for Cutie, Anberlin, Seafood (who released their cover of the song as a single in June 2007) and Fordirelifesake. Canadian musical duo Dala recorded their cover of the song on the 2005 album Angels & Thieves. Canadian psychobilly band the Brains recorded their version of the song in 2014 on their The Cover Up EP. Dutch indie band This Beautiful Mess recorded a version for a compilation of 80's cover hits.

Other solo artists have performed covers as well, such as Tori Amos during several live performances, most famously on the radio station KROQ-FM. Naimee Coleman included an interpretation of the song on her 2001 album Bring Down The Moon. Voltaire released an acoustic cover on his album Then and Again. It was also covered by Maltese singer Ira Losco, found on her 2007 unplugged album Unmasked. Japanese singer Immi included a cover of the song on her debut album Switch. American folk singer Mariee Sioux covered the song for the tribute album Perfect as Cats: A Tribute to The Cure in 2008. British singer Adele included a bossa nova cover of the song on her second album, 21, which peaked at #18 on Billboard's Smooth Jazz Songs chart. Nina Sky covered this song on their 2010 EP The Other Side.

The song was covered by Captain during a BBC Radio 2 live session with Dermot O'Leary. The American Indie-pop band Koufax covered it in several live apparitions.

The Big Pink provided a cover of "Lovesong" for The Cure tribute album Pictures of You: A Tribute to Godlike Geniuses The Cure, which was made available with the 25 February 2009 issue of NME.

=== Certifications (Adele version) ===
Region	Certification	Certified units/sales
New Zealand (RMNZ)	Gold	15,000^{‡}
United Kingdom (BPI)	Silver	200,000^{‡}
Streaming
Greece (IFPI Greece)	Gold	1,000,000^{†}
^{‡} Sales+streaming figures based on certification alone.^{†} Streaming-only figures based on certification alone.
