= Snow & Voices =

American dream pop band

Snow & Voices was an American, Los Angeles–based dream pop band featuring the duo of singer-songwriter Lauri Kranz and multi-instrumentalist Jebin Bruni in collaboration with other contributors. The group's first album, the eponymous Snow & Voices, was released in 2005 on Bird Song, a new label created by Ric Menck of Velvet Crush. Their sophomore effort, What the Body Was Made For, was released in July 2008. They released their third album, Anything That Moves, in May 2010 on Elastic Ruby Records, their own independent label.

As of December 2013, Snow & Voices was recording its fourth album. However, as of February 2019, the fourth album had not been released.

== Reception ==
=== Snow & Voices (2005) ===
A 2005 Los Angeles Times review of Snow & Voices said, "Kranz's music is elevated from her often-frail solo recordings, her brittle vocals buoyed by co-writer Jebin Bruni's arrangements and contributions from Buddy Judge, Greg Leisz and Menck, among others." The review also noted "the tenderness in her wistful bouquets to basic emotions".

Similarly, The Sacramento Bee said, "Every time Lauri Kranz's songs veer toward the overly precious, her band mates in Snow & Voices manage to pull her back to an earthier atmosphere." Comparing her "lovely, ethereal voice" to Lori Carson, the review said that "The overall effect, however, is often claustrophobic and cloying". According to critic Rachel Leibrock, a "true gem" on the album was the song "Good Night New York", while "Ordinary Girl" and "In Pieces through the Door" were "intriguing" due to their use of "found noise and ghostly effects".

=== Anything That Moves (2010) ===
In 2010, music critic Kevin Bronson described Anything That Moves as "a delicate flower, meticulously nurtured". Christine N. Ziemba writing for LAist described the album as "a moody, sonic palate that hints at the work of Mazzy Star or Aimee Mann, just with fewer guitars and more electronic flouishes". According to the review, the "melancholy, dreamy pop tunes" provided "perfect chill out music – or a great breakup album". Meanwhile, American Songwriter said that while it was tempting to describe the music as "warm, ethereal and ambient", "there is something inherently edgier here that reminds us of the more interesting and unpredictable aunts of the Lilith’s: Maria McKee, Johnette Napolitano, ‘Til Tuesday, The Hotels".

Critic Gregg Shapiro wrote in the Wisconsin Gazette called "Maybe Finland", "Everything Coming Apart" and "Blue" "a gorgeous trio of songs that lull the listener without putting them to sleep", while "I Am A Storm" "blows in to kick your ass". While less enthusiastic about "Maybe Finland", critic Chuck Campbell writing in The Knoxville News-Sentinel also highlighted "Everything Coming Apart" for "[capturing] the fear and dread" and "Blue" where Kranz "seems swarmed in disbelief as she succumbs to the impossible sadness of the ballad". In addition, Campbell rated "Please Be My Lover", saying it "will haunt many listeners long after the song ends".

== Discography ==
- Snow & Voices (Bird Song Recordings, 2005)
- What The Body Was Made For (Elastic Ruby Records, 2008)
- Anything That Moves (Elastic Ruby Records, 2010)
