= Erin Lang =

Canadian musician (born 1979)

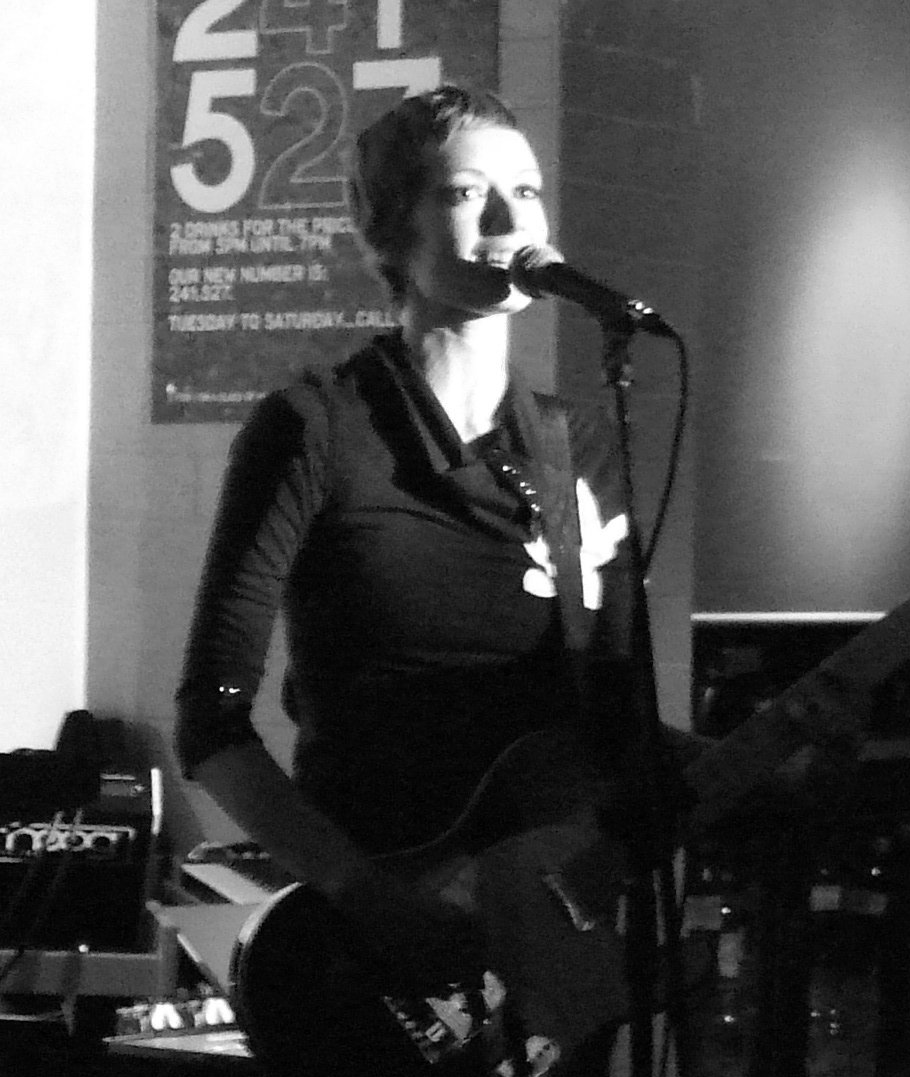

Background information
- Born: May 11, 1979 (age 47)
- Origin: Montreal, Quebec, Canada
- Genres: Electronic, alternative
- Occupation: Musician
- Instruments: Guitar, vocals
- Years active: 2000–present
- Website: erinlang.com

Erin Lang (born May 11, 1979) is a Canadian musician. She is the founder of musical group Feral & Stray, Erin Lang & The Foundlings and its earliest inversion The Tail Lights.

== Early life ==
Lang was born in Montreal; her father is Steve Lang, bassist with 1970s Canadian rock band April Wine. Her mother, Dale Lang, was a puppeteer and make up artist. She grew up in the Toronto suburb of Mississauga. Her younger brother, Robin Lang, is a filmmaker.

== Career ==
After high school, Lang played keyboard for local Toronto band Tuuli. She played bass in Canadian bands Jimmy Allen's Ant Farm, and Sixty Six Kicks before starting her own project.

In the summer of 2000, she met the English musician Roger O'Donnell, then keyboard player with The Cure; the two worked together as co-writers on Lang's first album and continue to collaborate on some projects. In 2005, Lang and O'Donnell formed their own independent record label 99 Times out of 10 with the intention of releasing material by previously unsigned bands. They made their debut album with Mario Thaler at his studio in Weilheim, south of Munich, Germany. Under this label Lang released an EP. Choose Your Own Adventure.

Lang sang on O'Donnell's 2006 album The Truth in Me and on two tracks of his 2009 album Songs From The Silver Box.

In 2011, Lang began working on her second album Between You And The Sea in the countryside of Quebec Canada in various recording spaces, churches, meeting halls and artists lofts. The album was produced by Marc Lawson (Arcade Fire, Owen Palett, Timber Timbre) and featured members of Timber Timbre and Elfin Saddle. In between recording sessions, Lang did some touring; she performed in the USA, South America and Canada, and made a tour of Europe, including a performance at the Le Guess Who? festival in Utrecht. The album was finally released in Germany Austria and Switzerland in November 2013 by the Berlin-based label mikrokleinstgarten.

In 2014, Lang toured solo as Feral & Stray supporting Danish singer Agnes Obel, on her European and Canadian tours for the release of the record Aventine.

In 2018, she performed on David Georgos' second album, Confidence.

== Discography ==
- Choose Your Own Adventure (EP, 2005)
- Foundlings And Strays (EP, 2008)
- You Are Found (LP, 2010)
- Between You and the Sea (LP, 2013) (as 'Feral & Stray'; produced by Mark Lawson & Erin Lang)
