= Fascination Street =

1989 single by The Cure

Single by the Cure

from the album Disintegration
- B-side: "Babble"; "Out of Mind"
- Released: 18 April 1989
- Genre: Gothic rock; alternative rock
- Length: 5:16 (album version); 4:20 (single version)
- Label: Elektra
- Composers: Robert Smith; Simon Gallup; Boris Williams; Porl Thompson; Roger O'Donnell; Lol Tolhurst
- Lyricist: Robert Smith
- Producers: Robert Smith; Dave Allen

The Cure singles chronology
"Lullaby" (1989)	"Fascination Street" (1989)	"Lovesong" (1989)

Music video
- "Fascination Street" on YouTube

"Fascination Street" is a song by English rock band the Cure from their eighth studio album, Disintegration (1989). It was issued as a single only in North America, as the band's American record company refused to release the band's original choice, "Lullaby", as the first single (it was the lead single in the UK and was released in the US later). The song became the band's first number-one single on the US Billboard then-newly created Modern Rock Tracks chart, staying on top for seven weeks.

An extended mix, notable for its lengthy 4:00 instrumental introduction, was produced by Robert Smith, Chris Parry and Mark Saunders and released as the lead track on the 12-inch vinyl and maxi-CD singles. A shorter radio edit of the remix was used for the 7-inch vinyl and cassette single releases. The extended mix was later included on the Cure's 1990 remix album Mixed Up, and the short remix has since been released worldwide on 1997's Galore (The Singles 1987-1997).

== Background ==
"Fascination Street" was inspired by an alcoholic night in New Orleans.

In the liner notes for the compilation Galore, Robert Smith describes “Fascination Street” as:

A ‘generic’ song about the (often cynical) delights of exploring a new city nightlife; based loosely on one particular ‘band adventure’ in New Orleans 1985 – Bourbon Street, the cliche perhaps.

Smith has additionally commented, "I was getting ready to go there, and I thought, 'What the fuck do I think I'm going to find?' It's about the incredulity that I could still be fooled into looking for a perfect moment."

== Track listings ==
7-inch and cassette: Elektra / 7 69300; 9 469300

1. "Fascination Street" (remix) (4:17)
2. "Babble" (4:16)

12-inch: Elektra / 96 67040 (CDN)

1. "Fascination Street" (extended remix) (8:48)
2. "Babble" (4:16)
3. "Out of Mind" (3:51)

12-inch: Elektra / 0-66704

1. "Fascination Street" (extended remix) (8:48)
2. "Babble" (4:16)
3. "Out of Mind" (3:51)

CD: Elektra / 66702-2

1. "Fascination Street" (remix) (4:17)
2. "Babble" (4:16)
3. "Out of Mind" (3:51)
4. "Fascination Street" (extended remix) (8:48)

== Personnel ==
Band

- Simon Gallup – bass guitar
- Robert Smith – lead guitar, keyboards, vocals, producer, engineer
- Porl Thompson – guitar
- Boris Williams – drums
- Roger O'Donnell – keyboards
- Lol Tolhurst – other instruments

Production

- Mark Saunders – remix
- Robert Smith – remix, producer, engineer
- Chris Parry – remix
- David M. Allen – producer, engineer

== Charts ==
=== Weekly charts ===
Chart (1989)	Peak position
US Billboard Hot 100	46
US Alternative Airplay (Billboard)	1
US Dance Club Songs (Billboard)	7
US Dance Singles Sales (Billboard)	13
US Mainstream Rock (Billboard)	24

=== Year-end charts ===
Chart (1989)	Position
US Modern Rock Tracks (Billboard)	2

== See also ==
- List of Billboard Modern Rock Tracks number ones of the 1980s
