= Roger O'Donnell =

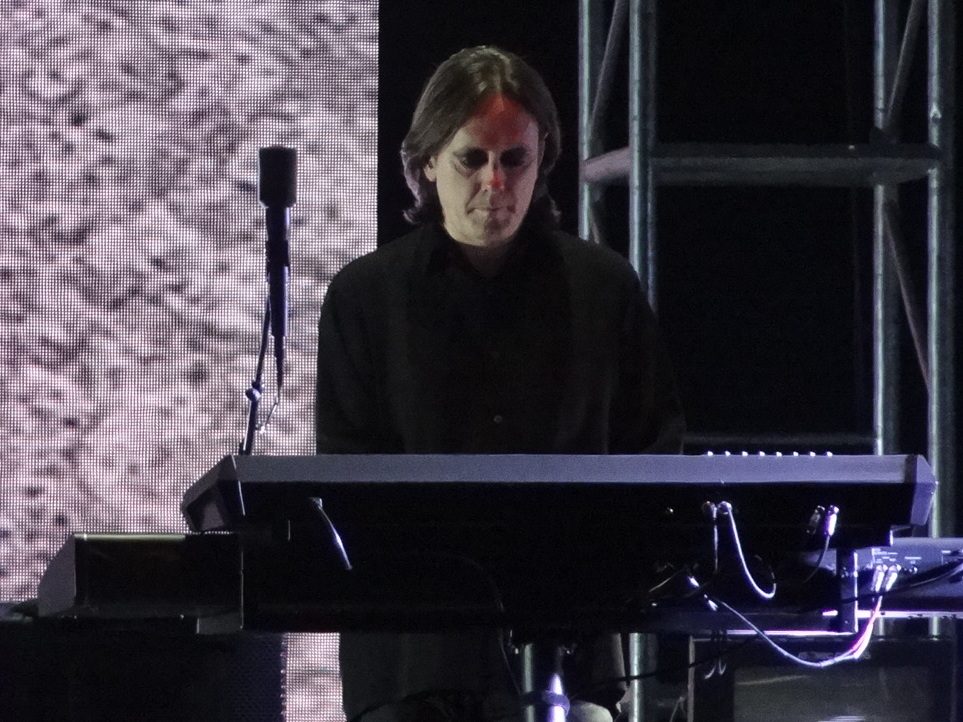
- O'Donnell performing in 2013

Background information
- Born: 29 October 1955 (age 70); East London, England
- Genres: Post-punk, gothic rock, dark wave, alternative rock, new wave, synthpop
- Occupations: Musician; composer
- Instruments: Keyboards; tambourine
- Years active: 1976–present
- Member of: The Cure
- Formerly of: The Psychedelic Furs; Berlin

Roger O'Donnell (born 29 October 1955) is an English keyboardist best known as a longtime member of The Cure, which he first joined in 1987 and for which he has served three different tenures. O'Donnell has also performed as a touring and session keyboardist for many artists and maintains an active solo career.

== Career ==
O'Donnell was born in East London into a musical family, next to the piano in his parents' home. O'Donnell briefly attended art school but left to pursue a career as a professional musician; his first paying gig was in 1976, backing Arthur Brown. He also played in local bands, primarily in the jazz fusion genre, with future Cure bandmate Boris Williams.

O'Donnell joined Thompson Twins as touring keyboardist in 1983, playing alongside Williams. During this period he also served as a session and touring keyboardist for Berlin and the Psychedelic Furs. O'Donnell began a long association with synthesizers produced by Sequential Circuits, and while performing with the Psychedelic Furs he set a record for having the most Sequential models onstage at one time.

In 1987, O'Donnell was recruited to join The Cure as touring keyboardist, at the recommendation of Williams who had been the band's drummer since 1984. The Cure needed an additional keyboardist to supplement founding member Lol Tolhurst, who had become unreliable due to alcohol abuse. O'Donnell joined just before the release of the album Kiss Me Kiss Me Kiss Me and appeared in the videos for two of that album's singles, though he did not play on the studio recordings.

At the end of the ensuing tour, group leader Robert Smith invited O'Donnell to join the Cure as an official member. O'Donnell was a major contributor to their 1989 album Disintegration. Unhappy with the large stadium-sized shows that the Cure played during that album's tour, and with personal differences among bandmates, O'Donnell left the band for the first time in 1990.

O'Donnell self-released the solo album Grey Clouds Red Sky in 1994. During this period, Smith revamped the lineup of the Cure due to multiple recent departures and invited O'Donnell to rejoin in early 1995. O'Donnell played on the band's next three albums: Wild Mood Swings, Bloodflowers, and The Cure. He was dismissed by Smith in 2005 in another revamping of the band's lineup.

O'Donnell released three solo albums in the following years, including The Truth in Me, and formed a record label called 99X/10 with longtime partner Erin Lang. He also contributed to a documentary about synthesizer pioneer Bob Moog. In 2011, he and former Cure bandmate Lol Tolhurst discussed a collaboration to commemorate the band's early albums. The Cure themselves had been discussing such a project of their own, and O'Donnell and Tolhurst joined the band onstage at the Sydney Opera House in Australia. O'Donnell then officially rejoined the Cure and remains with the band to the present day.

In 2019, O'Donnell was inducted into the Rock and Roll Hall of Fame as a member of the Cure. Since rejoining the band, he has continued to release solo works regularly, most recently the album 7 Different Words for Love in 2022; he has also composed a classical suite called "Quieter Trees" for orchestral performance.

== Personal life ==
On 1 September 2024, it was revealed that O'Donnell was diagnosed with lymphoma the previous year. O'Donnell posted a lengthy thread on X for Blood Cancer Awareness Month, stating that in September of the previous year he had been diagnosed with a “very rare and aggressive form of lymphoma” and that while he initially ignored the symptoms until his “devastating” lymphoma diagnosis, “the prognosis is amazing.”

== Discography ==
=== Albums and compositions ===
- Grey Clouds, Red Sky (1994, re-released 2005)
- The Truth in Me (2006)
- Songs from the Silver Box (2009)
- Piano Formations (2010)
- Love and Other Tragedies (2015)
- 2 Ravens (2020)
- 7 Different Words for Love (2022)
- Projections (2025)

=== EPs ===
- Charlie Crow – Trains on Bridges (2009)

=== Songs and scores ===
- "Another Year Away", song to the film score for the documentary Moog (2004)
- "Another Name" from Nothing Concrete – 99X/10 Label Sampler (2006)
- "Quieter Trees" (2011)
- Requiem (2012)
- The Bernhard Suite (2013)
