= MTV Icon =

Television specials by MTV

The MTV Icon series logo

MTV Icon (stylized as mtv:ICON) is a series of annual television specials produced by MTV between 2001 and 2004, each paying homage to a musical artist or band selected as a cultural icon, in a format similar to the network's annual Video Music Awards and Movie Awards events. A live audience of musicians, celebrities, and fans would view a biographical film depicting the career of that year's chosen icon, interspersed by celebrity introductions and live performances of popular artists playing cover versions of the icon's songs. The iconic artist would then accept an award and perform a live set of their own at the close of the show. The series celebrated Janet Jackson in 2001, Aerosmith in 2002, Metallica in 2003, and The Cure in 2004.

== 2001: Janet Jackson ==
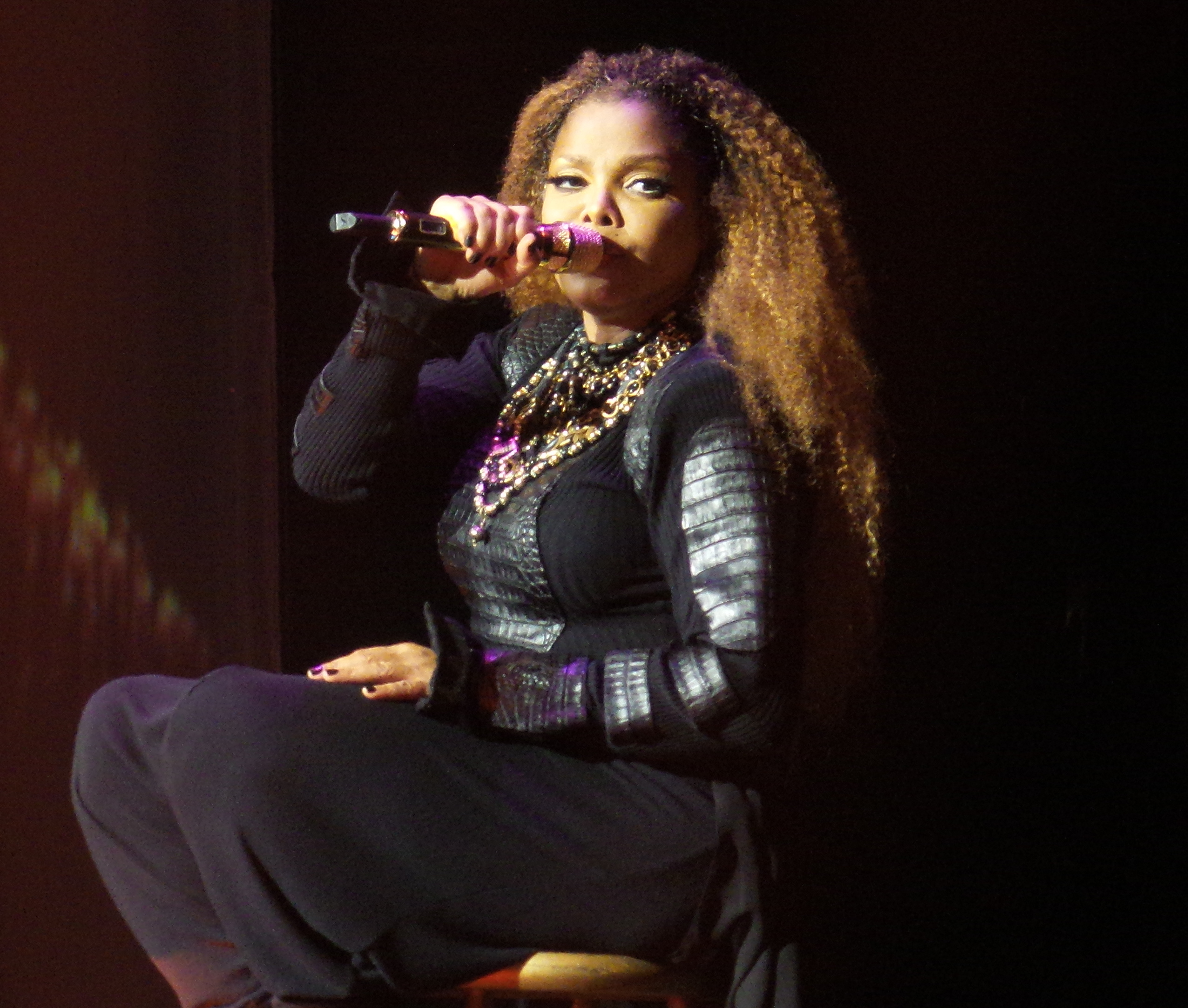
Janet Jackson was the first artist to be named an "MTV Icon".

American pop singer Janet Jackson was selected as MTV's inaugural Icon, in an event held in Los Angeles, California. Performers at the ceremony included 'N Sync, Pink, Usher, Outkast, Destiny's Child, Macy Gray, Mýa and Buckcherry. Celebrity presenters included Britney Spears, Jessica Simpson, Jennifer Lopez, Aaliyah, Christina Aguilera, Stevie Wonder, Michael Jackson, and record producers Jimmy Jam and Terry Lewis. Jackson herself concluded the event with a performance of her Billboard Hot 100 number-one single "All for You". The event was the highest rated television show of the night among the female 12-24 demographic, ahead of all broadcast and cable programs. MTV decided to develop the special as an annual franchise for other artists following the event's success. The show was held at Sony Pictures Studios in Culver City.

Performances

Performer(s)	Song(s)
Outkast	"Ms. Jackson"
Destiny's Child	"Let's Wait Awhile"
Macy Gray	"Love Will Never Do (Without You)"
'N Sync	"That's the Way Love Goes"
Pink, Usher, and Mýa	Dance medley of "Miss You Much", "Alright", "The Pleasure Principle", "If" and "Rhythm Nation"
Buckcherry	"Nasty"
Janet Jackson	"All for You/You Ain't Right"

== 2002: Aerosmith ==
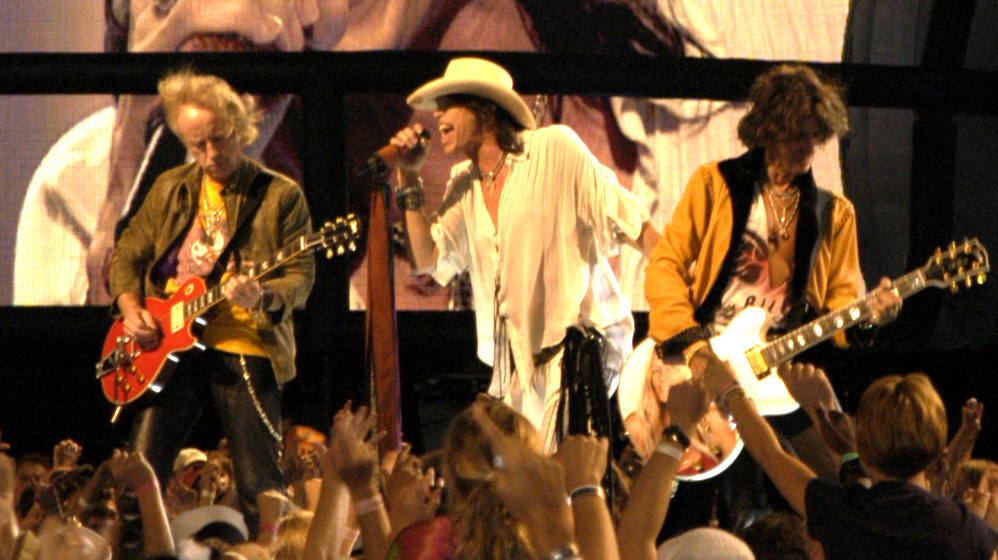
Aerosmith was chosen as the 2002 Icon.

In 2002 hard rock band Aerosmith was chosen as MTV's Icon. MTV Entertainment President Brian Graden remarked that "Aerosmith is one of those very few bands whose influence pre-dates and spans the entire history of MTV. They have become a fixture at the network, and we are thrilled to be able to honor them in this fashion for their continuing contributions to music and music video." The event began with the previous year's icon Janet Jackson delivering a testimonial about the band, and featured performances by The X-Ecutioners, Nelly, Ja Rule, DJ Clue, Sum 41, Pink, Shakira, Kid Rock, Train, and Papa Roach, concluding with a five-song set by Aerosmith themselves. The show was held at Sony Pictures Studios in Culver City.

Performances

Performer(s)	Song(s)
The X-Ecutioners	medley of "Sweet Emotion", "Dude (Looks Like a Lady)", "Love in an Elevator", and "Walk This Way"
Train	"Dream On"
Papa Roach	"Sweet Emotion"
Kid Rock	medley of "Mama Kin" and "Last Child"
Nelly, Ja Rule, DJ Clue, and Sum 41	"Walk This Way"
Shakira	"Dude (Looks Like a Lady)"
Pink	"Janie's Got a Gun"
Aerosmith	"Movin' Out", "Toys in the Attic", "Cryin'", "Girls of Summer", and "Train Kept A-Rollin'"

== 2003: Metallica ==
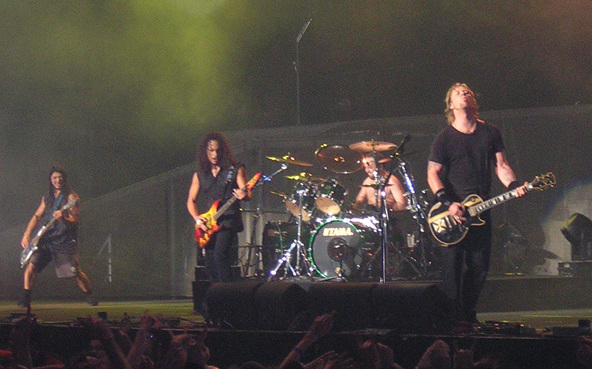
Metallica's performance on MTV Icon was their first television appearance with new bassist Robert Trujillo (left).

Heavy metal band Metallica was selected as MTV's Icon for 2003, with the event held in Universal City, California. It featured performances by Sum 41, Staind's Aaron Lewis and Mike Mushok, Avril Lavigne, Snoop Dogg, Korn, and Limp Bizkit, as well as celebrity appearances by Rob Zombie, Jillian Barberie, Travis Barker, Jolene Blalock, Iann Robinson, Jim Breuer, Shannon Elizabeth, Lisa Marie Presley, Chester Bennington, Wes Scantlin and Sean Penn. The special concluded with Metallica performing a medley of songs from their early albums, spanning 1983 to 1991, followed by their most recent single, "Frantic". It was their first television appearance with bassist Robert Trujillo, who had joined the band just a few months prior. MTV set up a website to promote the special, featuring testimonials by celebrities and musicians including Kelly Osbourne, Godsmack's Sully Erna, Ja Rule, and Linkin Park's Bennington and Dave "Phoenix" Farrell.

Performances

Performer(s)	Song(s)
Sum 41	medley of "For Whom the Bell Tolls", "Enter Sandman", and "Master of Puppets"
Aaron Lewis and Mike Mushok	"Nothing Else Matters"
Avril Lavigne	"Fuel"
Snoop Dogg	"Sad but True"
Jim Breuer	"If You're Happy and You Know It (In the Style of Metallica)"
Korn	"One"
Limp Bizkit	"Welcome Home (Sanitarium)"
Metallica	medley of "Hit the Lights", "Enter Sandman", "Blackened", "Creeping Death", and "Battery"; "Frantic"

== 2004: The Cure ==
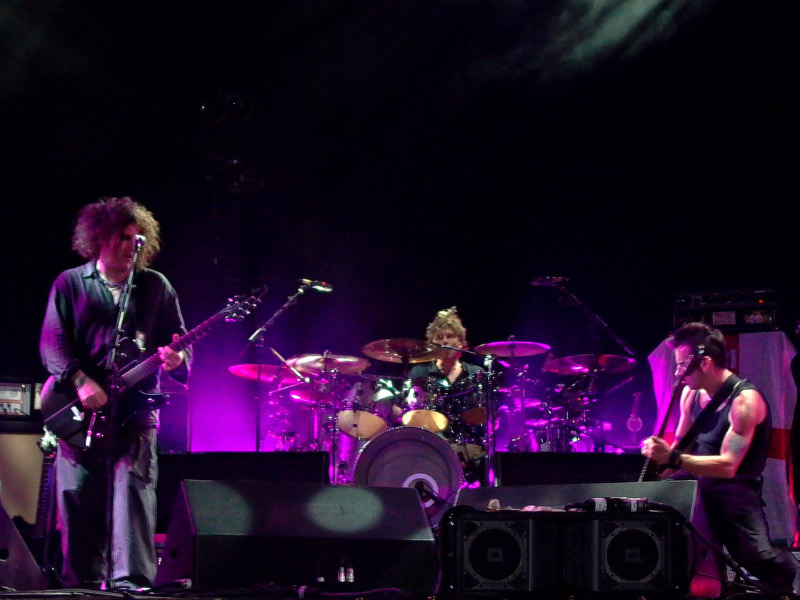
The Cure were the fourth and final act to be named an MTV Icon.

The 2004 MTV Icon special was held at the Old Billingsgate Market in London to a crowd of over 1,000 and named post-punk/gothic rock band The Cure as the icon of the year. Marilyn Manson hosted the event, which featured Blink-182, AFI, Razorlight, and Deftones performing cover versions of Cure songs. Cure frontman Robert Smith joined Blink-182 onstage to perform "All of This", a song he had sung on for their untitled 2003 album. During set changes the audience were shown many of the band's music videos from throughout their career. The Cure themselves closed the show by performing a number of songs including "Friday I'm in Love". Their performances of "Taking Off", and "10:15 Saturday Night" were selected to be shown in the final broadcast, representing bookends of their career ("Taking Off" being their most recent single while "10:15 Saturday Night" was the first track on their 1979 debut album). Tim Weber of BBC News remarked of the performance that "from the first riff it was obvious that they have managed to haul their music firmly into the 21st century. The Cure may still be the masters of mourning, but their performance had an edge and drive that would do any nu metal band proud. Even old favourites like 'Friday I'm in Love' were—almost—purged of the popcorn sound of the New Wave 1980s." MTV Icon: The Cure premiered October 31, 2004, on MTV2.

Performances

Performer(s)	Song(s)
Blink-182	"A Letter to Elise", "All of This" (with Robert Smith)
AFI	"Just Like Heaven"
Razorlight	"Boys Don't Cry"
Deftones	"If Only Tonight We Could Sleep"
The Cure	"Friday I'm in Love", "Taking Off", and "10:15 Saturday Night"
