= Chris Parry (producer) =

New Zealand drummer and record producer

- Born: John Christopher Parry; 7 January 1949 (age 77); Lower Hutt, New Zealand
- Occupations: Record producer; manager; musician
- Instrument: Drums
- Years active: 1967–2001; 2010
- Formerly of: The Fourmyula

John Christopher Parry (born 7 January 1949) is a New Zealand record producer and former musician, known for being the former manager and producer for the Cure and for founding Fiction Records.

== Early life ==
Parry was born in Lower Hutt, New Zealand; the son of Virginia and Thomas, who was British. He grew up with ten siblings: five sisters (Virginia, Margaret, Josephine, Annette and Helen) and five brothers (David, James Richard, Robin and Peter). In 1966, Parry was a management trainee at Philips Electrical.

== Career ==
In 1967, whilst studying at Silverstream College, Parry auditioned as drummer for a band called the Sine Waves, who later renamed themselves the Fourmyula. He has stated "I got the job because I had a truck driver's licence". Within a year, the band had hit the charts, reaching number 2 in New Zealand with "Come with Me" and reached number 1 in 1969 with "Nature". The band made two trips to the UK, but were not so successful there. After the band split in 1971, Parry returned to England and spent two years obtaining a diploma in marketing and advertising from the College for Distributive Trades in London. He then found a job in the International department at Phonogram Records, under fellow New Zealander John McCready.

In 1974, Parry was offered a job at Polydor in A&R. His first signing was the Chanter Sisters. Punk was in its early days but it was clear that it was going to be big, so Parry went to check out some of these bands. His requests to Polydor in 1976 to sign the Sex Pistols and the Clash were rejected. However, in January 1977, he got a tip from future-Pogues frontman Shane MacGowan to check out the Jam. Parry was convinced and signed them to Polydor in February. He also co-produced the Jam's first three albums as well as the eponymous sole album by the Jolt who he also signed. Later in 1977, he helped convince Polydor to sign Siouxsie and the Banshees after listening to "Hong Kong Garden" from the BBC's John Peel sessions.

In 1978, Parry began starting his own record label, which was later to be named Fiction, which was to be an imprint of Polydor, after becoming increasingly frustrated with Polydor not listening to his requests. He listened to a demo tape by the Cure and was particularly impressed with "10:15 Saturday Night" and also "Boys Don't Cry". He called them up and a meeting was arranged for August at Polydor's office in Stratford Place. After the meeting, Robert Smith invited Parry to watch them perform at the Laker's Hotel in Redhill on 27 August. After the gig, Parry invited them to a drink at a nearby pub, The Home Cottage, at which he told the Cure he wanted them to be his first signing, which they agreed to and they officially signed in September. Soon after, Parry signed Billy MacKenzie and Alan Rankine, who went on to form the Associates. Along with engineer Mike Hedges, Parry then recorded the Cure's first album Three Imaginary Boys at Morgan Studios, which was released in May 1979. The next four studio albums released were Purple Hearts' Beat That!, the Passions' Michael & Miranda, the Cure's Seventeen Seconds and the Associates' The Affectionate Punch, all in 1980. Parry managed the Cure until 1988 and Fiction released their music until 2001, when he sold the label to Universal Records. Parry says he "kind of retired from music if you like when I was 52 or 53 in 2001 when I sold everything out".

In 1992, along with Sammy Jacob, Parry launched radio station Xfm (rebranded as Radio X in 2015) in London. The left-field alternative station was a "mix between bFM and early Radio Hauraki" according to Parry, who was managing director. The station was sold to Capital Radio Group in 1998.

In 2010, the Fourmyula reformed in order to promote a box set release. With Parry reprising his role as drummer, they played two concerts, one in February in Auckland and the other in March in Upper Hutt. In September, as part of the Fourmyula, Parry was inducted into the New Zealand Music Hall of Fame.

== Personal life ==
In 1971, Parry first married a woman from Scotland, saying "we were way too young". In 1974, he became a father for the first time. Sometime before the 1990s, Parry had two more children with then-partner Elaine. In 1996, he bought a property on the Coromandel Peninsula, where he has been living since. He remarried in around 2010. In 2016, he met Susan Verkerk, who has since been his partner.

== Production credits ==
=== Albums ===
- In the City – The Jam (1977) (co-produced with Vic Coppersmith-Heaven)
- This Is the Modern World – The Jam (1977) (co-produced with Vic Coppersmith-Heaven)
- The Jolt – The Jolt (1978) (co-produced with Vic Coppersmith-Heaven)
- All Mod Cons – The Jam (1978) (co-produced with Vic Coppersmith-Heaven)
- Three Imaginary Boys – The Cure (1979)
- Boys Don’t Cry – The Cure (1980) (compilation album)
- Beat That! – Purple Hearts (1980)
- Michael & Miranda – The Passions (1980)
- The Affectionate Punch – The Associates (1980)
- The Top – The Cure (1984) (co-produced with David M. Allen and Robert Smith)
- Mixed Up – The Cure (1990) (remix album co-produced with David M. Allen, Robert Smith and Mark Saunders. Parry didn't produce the original songs)
- Suck It and See – Candyland (1991) (co-produced with Phil Chill all tracks apart from "Fountain O' Youth")
- No Love in Future – The Trial (1992)

=== Non-album singles and EPs ===
- "All Around the World" – The Jam (1977) (co-produced with Vic Coppersmith-Heaven)
- "News of the World" – The Jam (1978) (co-produced with Vic Coppersmith-Heaven)
- "Killing an Arab" – The Cure (1978)
- "All Sewn Up" – Patrik Fitzgerald (1979)
- "Boys Don't Cry" – The Cure (1979)
- "Million Hearts" – Purple Hearts (1979)
- "Your Side of Heaven" – Back to Zero (1979)
- "Jumping Someone Else's Train" – The Cure (1979)
- "Hunted" – The Passions (1979)
- "I'm a Cult Hero" – Cult Hero (extended lineup of The Cure) (1979)
- "Let's Go to Bed" – The Cure (1982)
- Fire in Reflection – Ellery Bop (1983) (EP; co-produced with Ian Broudie, who is credited as King Bird)
- "The Love Cats" – The Cure (1983) (co-produced with Phil Thornalley and The Cure)
- "I Want to Be a Tree" – Tim Pope (1984)
- Half an Octopuss & Quadpus – The Cure (1985/86) (EPs; only co-produced "New Day")
- "Spit" – NY Loose (1995)

== Awards ==
=== Aotearoa Music Awards ===
The Aotearoa Music Awards (previously known as New Zealand Music Awards (NZMA)) are an annual awards night celebrating excellence in New Zealand music and have been presented annually since 1965.

Year	Nominee / work	Award	Result	Ref.
2010	Chris Parry (as part of The Fourmyula)	New Zealand Music Hall of Fame	inductee	
