= All for You (Janet Jackson song) =

2001 song by Janet Jackson

Single by Janet Jackson

from the album All for You
- Released: March 6, 2001
- Studio: Flyte Tyme (Edina, Minnesota)
- Genre: Dance-pop; R&B
- Length: 6:31 (original/LP album version); 5:29 (CD album version); 4:24 (radio edit); 4:32 (video/single mix)
- Label: Virgin
- Songwriters: Janet Jackson; James Harris III; Terry Lewis; Wayne Garfield; David Romani; Mauro Malavasi
- Producers: Janet Jackson; Jimmy Jam; Terry Lewis

Janet Jackson singles chronology
"Doesn't Really Matter" (2000)	"All for You" (2001)	"Someone to Call My Lover" (2001)

Music video
- "All for You" on YouTube

"All for You" is a song by American singer-songwriter Janet Jackson, from her seventh studio album of the same name (2001). Written and produced by Jackson along with her collaborators Jimmy Jam and Terry Lewis, the song is a dance-pop and R&B track with influences of neo-disco and funk that heavily samples "The Glow of Love" by Change. Lyrically, it is about flirting with someone on the dance floor, being a reflection of the singer's state of mind at the time. The song was released to radio stations as the lead single from the record in the United States on March 6, 2001, by Virgin Records, becoming the first single to be added to every pop, rhythmic, and urban radio format within its first week of release.

"All for You" received positive reviews from music critics, who complimented the usage of the sample. In the US, the song peaked atop the Billboard Hot 100 for seven weeks, making it the longest-reigning hit of the year after setting the record for the highest debut of a song which was not commercially available in the country. To date, it is Jackson's tenth and last number one Hot 100 hit in the US, and was certified platinum by the Recording Industry Association of America (RIAA). The song also attained success worldwide, peaking at number one in Canada and South Africa, while reaching the top 10 in countries like Australia, France, and the United Kingdom.

An accompanying music video was directed by Dave Meyers and takes place in a colorful two-dimensional world. It received several nominations at the 2001 MTV Video Music Awards, and it won Best Dance Video at the 31st Annual International Dance Music Awards. Jackson performed the song several times, including on the inaugural MTV Icon special, which honored her legacy and influence in the music industry, and it was later added to setlists of all of her concert tours, the last being the Janet Jackson: Together Again tour (2023–2024). "All for You" won several accolades, including the prize for Best Dance Recording at the 44th Annual Grammy Awards, and was referenced on the track "Snow on the Beach" (2022) by Taylor Swift featuring Lana Del Rey.

== Background and release ==
In 2000, Janet Jackson was separated from René Elizondo Jr., exposing their secret nine-year marriage to the public as he filed for divorce, leading to intense media scrutiny. Amidst the divorce, Jackson started working on a new album, which was described as "upbeat, fun and carefree", in contrast to the dark and sexually explicit previous record The Velvet Rope (1997). The singer's producer Jimmy Jam stated, "This record now, even though it may not be the best of times in her personal life, she feels that the future is bright... She's excited about music and about life in general. She's excited about what the next year will hold for her", and revealed that it would continue her tradition of "happy records" which "have always traditionally been the more successful records", but "with kind of a nod to the dance music of the '80s". Jackson herself characterized the album, titled All for You, as being "about love, the different levels of love. It's a very happy album. I'm always writing about what is going on in my life, what I'm feeling at the moment."

Before starting a new project, Jackson and her longtime producers Jimmy Jam and Terry Lewis usually listen to older songs together to find inspiration. One of the tracks the producers played for the singer was Italo disco band Change's "The Glow of Love" (1980), with lead vocals by Luther Vandross. Jackson did not know the song, but Jam wanted to sample it as he used to play it when he was a DJ, and thought it was a perfect fit to her lyrics for "All for You". Jam wrote the line "All the girls at the party" after Jackson had done all the vocals for the track, which she appreciated. The line originally came in the middle of the number, but it was moved to the beginning after her manager suggested it would be cool if the song started like that. During a photo shoot for a magazine at Jam and Lewis' studio, she requested "All for You" to be played several times; after the fifth play, her makeup artist, the camera assistant, the hairstylist, and everybody involved was singing and dancing to the song, according to the producer. Although the recording sessions for All for You were not finished at that point, Jackson told the producers that she wanted to release the track as the first single from the project after the photo shoot, as it was the first song she wanted people to hear from her after being absent from the public eye for an extended period of time.

In February 2001, MTV News revealed that the first release from the album would be titled "All 4 U"; it would be sent to radio stations in the following weeks, with an accompanying video being filmed shortly thereafter. Jam described the track as an "'80s-sounding" dance number, which "epitomizes the disc's happy vibe". Re-titled as "All for You", the song was made available for download to radio stations on February 27, 2001, as the lead single from the album after being leaked the day prior. On March 6, Virgin Records officially sent the track to contemporary hit, rhythmic contemporary, and urban stations, followed by urban adult contemporary stations a week later. It was made available commercially as a 7-inch vinyl, 12-inch vinyl, cassette, and CD single on March 27, 2001. On April 2, "All for You" was sent to adult contemporary stations in the region, and was released as a maxi CD single in Australia on the same day. In the United Kingdom, the track received a commercial release on April 9, 2001. Afterwards, the song was included on Jackson's greatest hits albums Number Ones (2009) and Icon: Number Ones (2010).

== Recording and composition ==
"All for You" was recorded at Flyte Tyme Studios in Edina, Minnesota. It was co-written and produced by Jackson with Jam and Lewis. Due to the sample's usage, Wayne Garfield, David Romani, and Mauro Malavasi also received songwriting credits. Instrumentation included guitar by David Barry, and drums by Alex Richbourg, who also did MIDI programming; Jam and Lewis played all additional instruments on the track. It was recorded and mixed by Steve Hodge, with assistance by Brad Yost and Xavier Smith, and mastered by Brian "Big Bass" Gardner at Bernie Grundman Mastering in Hollywood, along with all tracks present on All for You.

"All for You"
A 30-second sample of "All for You", a song influenced by funk and neo-disco, lyrically depicting Jackson flirting with someone on a dance floor.

Musically, "All for You" is a dance-pop and R&B song with influences of funk and neo-disco. The track is set in common time with a moderate groove tempo of 112 beats per minute. Composed in the key of G major, Jackson's vocal range spans from G_{3} to E_{5}. It prominently samples Change's "The Glow of Love". Jackson did not know the track or its songwriter, but she found it "so beautiful" and made her dance, and for this reason she included the track on the record. For The Guardian's Michael Cragg, the track simultaneously references the 1970s, 1980s and 1990s decades musically, writing in another article for the same publication that it "feels like a throwback to the effortless, loved-up optimism of her 80s imperial phase". Eric Henderson from Slant Magazine described "All for You" as a "sex jam that sounds like a carnival ride". Tom Sinclair of Entertainment Weekly noted that the track "recalls the old McFadden & Whitehead positivity anthem 'Ain't No Stoppin' Us Now'", with some reviewers also comparing the composition to the work of Chic.

Lyrically, the song explores Jackson flirting with someone while she is in a night club: "All my girls at the party, look at that body, shakin' that thing like you never did see. Got a nice package alright, guess I'm gonna have to ride it tonight." However, she becomes disappointed by his inability to approach and ask her for a dance: "Can't be afraid or keep me waiting too long, before you know it I'll be outta here, I'll be gone". Shahzaib Hussain from Clash commented that the lyrics manifest "having the best night out with your girls", while Laura Sinagra wrote on the book The New Rolling Stone Album Guide that the track "conjures sexy girl-talk fun under a disco ball". Kovie Biakolo of Vulture said it characterizes the anticipation and "the thrill of flirting with someone who has caught your eye, from the dance floor", as well as the singer's state of mind at the time, as she let everyone know that she was single and ready for a new love. Jackson based the lyrics on her experiences seeing people at clubs who were attracted to her but too intimidated to approach her, which she described as "pretty funny".

== Critical reception ==
"All for You" was described by Chuck Taylor from Billboard as a "veritable vitamin shot in the arm for the airwaves", and "as playful and joyous as the best from Jackson's deep uptempo catalog". He also wrote that the song "audaciously ignores top 40's current trend toward strict R&B inflection" and was "mainstream party pop at its best". Laviea Thomas of Clash commented that "from the funky bass plucks to her smooth vocal delivery", the song was one of Jackson's signature up-tempo tracks. Mark Lindores from Classic Pop wrote that the track was part of the "feelgood songs which are the beating heart of the album". Rolling Stone's Anthony DeCurtis praised the song for "swirl[ing] on the dizzying energy of a disco-era sample". Ethan Brown from New York opined that Jackson was at her best "riding great samples" from the disco era, while Wall of Sound's Gary Gruff wrote that it employs "old-school conventions without lapsing into retrograde". According to Cragg of The Guardian, the track "luxuriates in its post-disco influences, while lyrically it's Jackson at her cheeky best". For Cyd Jaymes from Dotmusic, "All for You" was a "dreamy slice of supremely steamy R&B", as well as "the soundtrack to some sweaty summer lovin'".

Bianca Gracie, writing for Grammy.com, noted that Jackson's joyride was "near-tangible" on the song, and was "pure sunshine captured in a song". Stephen Thomas Erlewine, senior editor for AllMusic, said that the song would maintain Jackson and her producers' reputation as the "leading lights of contemporary urban soul". Piers Martin of NME called the song a "faultless funk affair", while Anthony Carew from Neumu described it as a "fine neo-disco/'80s-retro collage", Sinclair of Entertainment Weekly described it as "chirpy computer pop overlaid with a silky Jackson vocal", classifying the track as one of several 1970s-inspired songs that would please both old and new generations. David Browne from the same publication wrote that the song was "a frothy butt shaker and skilled throwback to old-school disco", calling it "another Jackson package with pretty ribbons but little inside". Henderson from Slant Magazine noted that what was striking about the song was not its "unabashed frankness", but "the atmosphere of airless frivolity around it". According to Stereogum's Tom Breiham, "All for You" was a "fairly slight, minor track" in comparison to Jackson's other number-one singles, but felt that "its charms are real", writing that he loves the way that Jackson sings on the track.

=== Accolades ===
At the 2001 Billboard Music Awards, "All for You" received a nomination for Top Hot 100 Single of the Year, and was also nominated at the Lady of Soul Awards for Best R&B/Soul Single, Solo, and at the Teen People Awards in the category of Hottest Song of 2001. The single won the Record of the Year at the Japan Radio Popular Disks Awards. In 2002, "All for You" went on to win the prize for Best Dance Recording at the 44th Annual Grammy Awards, while it won Most Played Song at the BMI Pop Awards, as well as an award for Best Dance Song of the Year at the ASCAP Rhythm & Soul Awards.

== Commercial performance ==
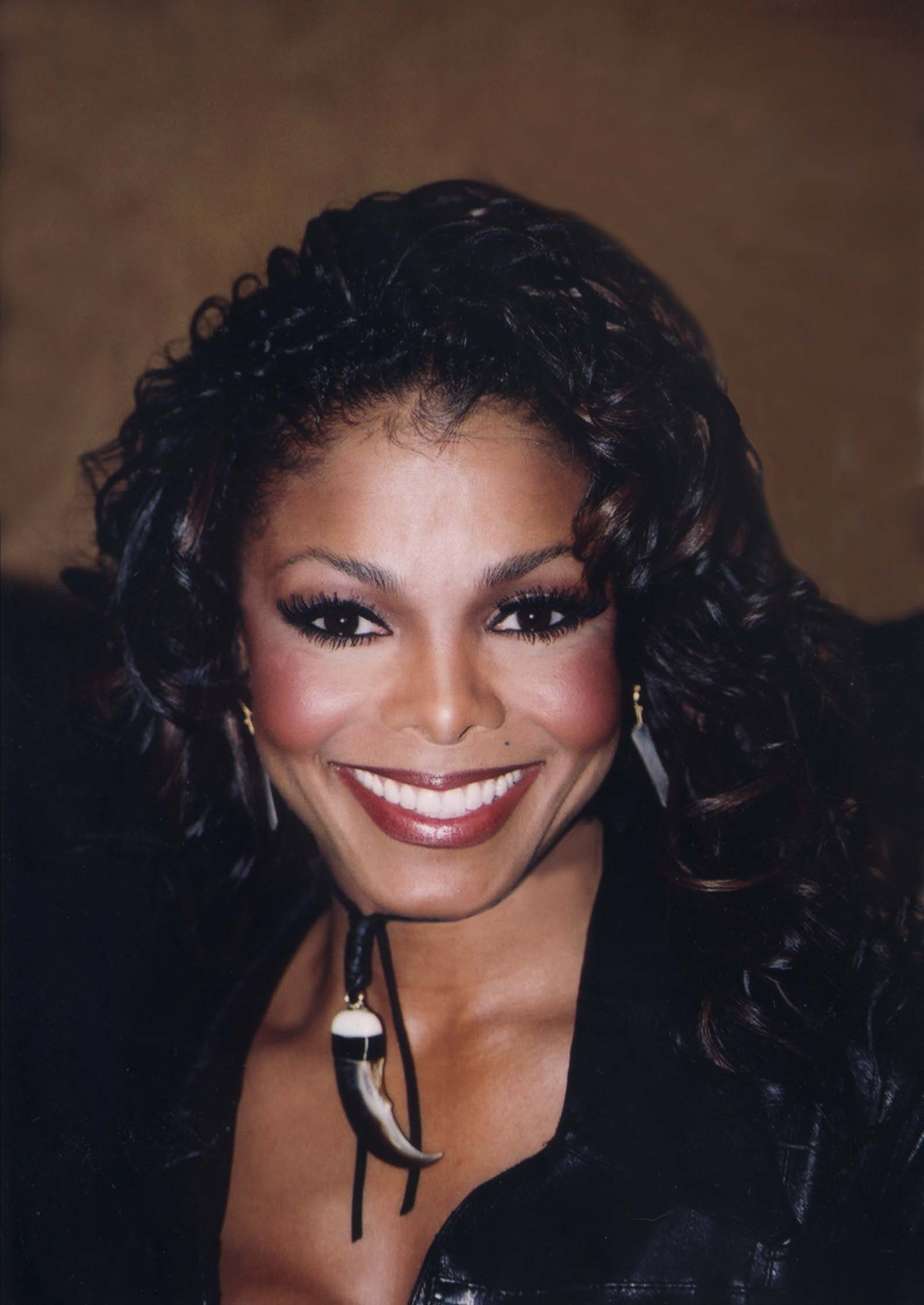
Jackson (pictured in 2002) was dubbed "Queen of Radio" after "All for You" was added to every pop, rhythmic, and urban radio format in its first week.

In the US, "All for You" made radio airplay history, as it was added to every pop, rhythmic and urban radio station on its first week of release. Teri VanHorn of MTV dubbed Jackson "Queen of Radio" for this feat, writing that "no other song has conquered all reporting stations in its first week at radio, let alone mastered three formats in one week". The record was later broken by Lady Gaga's "Born This Way" (2011), although Gaga's single was able to achieve the feat with a radio airplay deal to play the song hourly. Its premature release to radio outlets caused the track to debut at number 71 on the Hot R&B/Hip-Hop Singles & Tracks chart after a day and a half of airplay, generating an audience impression of six million. "All for You" debuted on the Billboard Hot 100 singles chart at number 14 on the issue dated March 17, 2001. It became the highest debut ever for a single that was not commercially available, as well as the highest entry on the chart since 1999. The single topped the chart following its commercial release, becoming the first song by a female artist of the decade to advance to number one, as well as Jackson's tenth and last number-one hit to date. The song remained at number-one for seven consecutive weeks, becoming 2001's longest-running chart-topper on the Hot 100. On November 14, 2022, "All for You" was certified platinum by the Recording Industry Association of America (RIAA), denoting 1,000,000 copies sold in the US.

In Canada, "All for You" topped the chart compiled by Nielsen SoundScan for the issue dated April 21, 2001, where it remained for a further week. In Australia, the track debuted at number five on the week dated April 15, 2001, becoming Jackson's highest charting-single on the ARIA Charts since "Together Again" (1997), and spent 12 weeks inside the chart. It was eventually certified platinum by the Australian Recording Industry Association (ARIA) for shipments of over 70,000 copies across the country. On March 25, 2001, the track debuted at number 34 in New Zealand, reaching number two five weeks later, where it remained for a further week. The song became Jackson's best-performing single in the country since "Scream" (with Michael Jackson) and "Whoops Now" / "What'll I Do", which reached number one in 1995. After spending a total of 17 weeks on the chart, "All for You" was certified gold by the Recording Industry Association of New Zealand (now Recorded Music NZ) for sales of over 5,000 copies of the single. In 2021, Recorded Music NZ awarded the song a platinum certification for digital sales and streaming figures exceeding 30,000 units. In South Africa, the single topped the charts and received a platinum certification by the Recording Industry of South Africa, denoting sales of 50,000 copies in the region.

In the UK, "All for You" debuted and peaked at number three on the UK Singles Chart for the week dated April 21, 2001, behind Emma Bunton's "What Took You So Long?" and Shaggy and RikRok's "It Wasn't Me", becoming Jackson's fourth single to reach number three on the chart. It spent a total of 15 weeks on the chart, and received a gold certification by the British Phonographic Industry (BPI) for sales of 400,000 copies in the UK. In April 2021, it was revealed by the Official Charts Company that the single was Jackson's third most downloaded track in the region, accumulating 10.3 million streams. The song attained lower success in Scotland, peaking at number 11. Elsewhere in Europe, "All for You" was also successful. It reached the top 10 in both Belgium's Flemish and Walloon regions, and was certified gold by the Belgian Entertainment Association (BEA), denoting sales of 25,000 copies of the single. The track reached number three in France, and received a gold certification by SNEP, for sales of 250,000 units. The single's commercial performance in the European countries helped it attain a peak of number three on the Eurochart Hot 100 chart, on the issue dated April 23, 2001.

== Music video ==
The music video for "All for You" was directed by Dave Meyers, who also wrote its concept. Explaining her decision to cast Meyers to direct the video, Jackson said she was already familiar with his work, and thought his videos got "better and better" as she watched them. Meyers would later become Jackson's frequent collaborator, directing several of her videos, including "I Want You" (2004), "Dammn Baby" (2016), and "Made for Now" (2018). Jackson's three Y2K-inspired outfits in the video were designed by Jean Paul Gaultier. It received its world premiere on March 9, 2001, on MTV's Total Request Live, and later appeared on the special edition of All for You, as well as on the video compilation From Janet to Damita Jo: The Videos (2004).

Jackson and her dancers at a boardwalk resembling downtown Hollywood in the two-dimensional music video for "All for You"

The clip takes place in a colorful two-dimensional world. It opens with a background of a brightly colored city with a train riding through it. A zoom-in reveals Jackson as one of its passengers, checking out a guy at the train across the aisle. At the next stop, she gets out of the train and joins her female dancers to do a dance routine. Later, the singer and her dancers are then seen at a boardwalk which resembles downtown Hollywood, where a billboard of an almost nude Jackson is seen; they perform a dance break that briefly samples several different songs, including her sister Rebbie's "Centipede" (1984), and Shannon's "Let the Music Play" (1983), as well as Jackson's own singles "The Pleasure Principle" (1987) and "Go Deep" (1998). The visual ends with the singer spotting the man she was checking out at the train near a nightclub, who smiles at her as she waves at him before turning to leave.

Vulture's Biakolo described the visual as "fun, upbeat, and subtly amorous", whereas Philadelphia's Patrick Demarco considered the clip as one of the singer's sexiest dance videos, elaborating it was "one of her most colorful video romps", featuring "barefoot dancing, sun-kissed sets and abs by Janet that went on for days". Given its "vague outline of a storyline", Breiham of Stereogum observed that the video was "really just structured as an excuse for Janet Jackson to dance". Described as "a celebration of love, freedom, and joy", HotNewHipHop's Gale Love wrote that it showcases Jackson's ability "to blend her talents into an impactful work of art", and remains one of her most beloved videos. Lester Fabian Brathwaite of Logo TV said the visual was vibrant and imaginative, but wrote that it did not "even rank in the top 10 or 15 of Janet's greatest videos", although it featured one of Jackson's best dance breaks, while Neil Prince from Time Out commented that the video portrayed an "almost scarily slimline Janet".

The video was nominated at the 2001 MTV Video Music Awards in the categories of Video of the Year, Best Female Video, Best Dance Video, and Best Choreography, but lost all nominations. At the inaugural BET Awards 2001, which took place in Las Vegas, Nevada, the video received a nomination for Video of the Year, but lost to Outkast's "Ms. Jackson". The clip was also nominated for a prize in the category of Outstanding Music Video at the 33rd NAACP Image Awards. The video for "All for You" went on to win the accolade for Best Dance Video at the 31st Annual International Dance Music Awards, while winning the Best Choreography category at the MVPA Awards.

== Live performances ==
Jackson first performed "All for You" on March 10, 2001, on the inaugural MTV Icon special, which honored her legacy and influence in the music industry, airing on MTV three days later. On the performance, she and two dancers were lowered from the ceiling, sitting on hoops, with the singer dressed all in white in a half-tuxedo, half-halter outfit, followed by a dance breakdown to "You Ain't Right". Her dancers wore all-white costumes that paid homage to some of Jackson's previous music videos. Gayl Murphy from ABC News wrote that the singer "didn't miss a beat and was bursting with the same energy and charisma" she had at the beginning of her career more than a decade before. She then went on a promotional tour in Europe and performed "All for You" on several televised shows, including Top of the Pops and Quelli che... il Calcio. The song was included on the setlist for the 2001–2002 All for You Tour and was performed on the first act. During the number, the stage's back wall opened up to reveal three twenty-five by ten foot video screens.

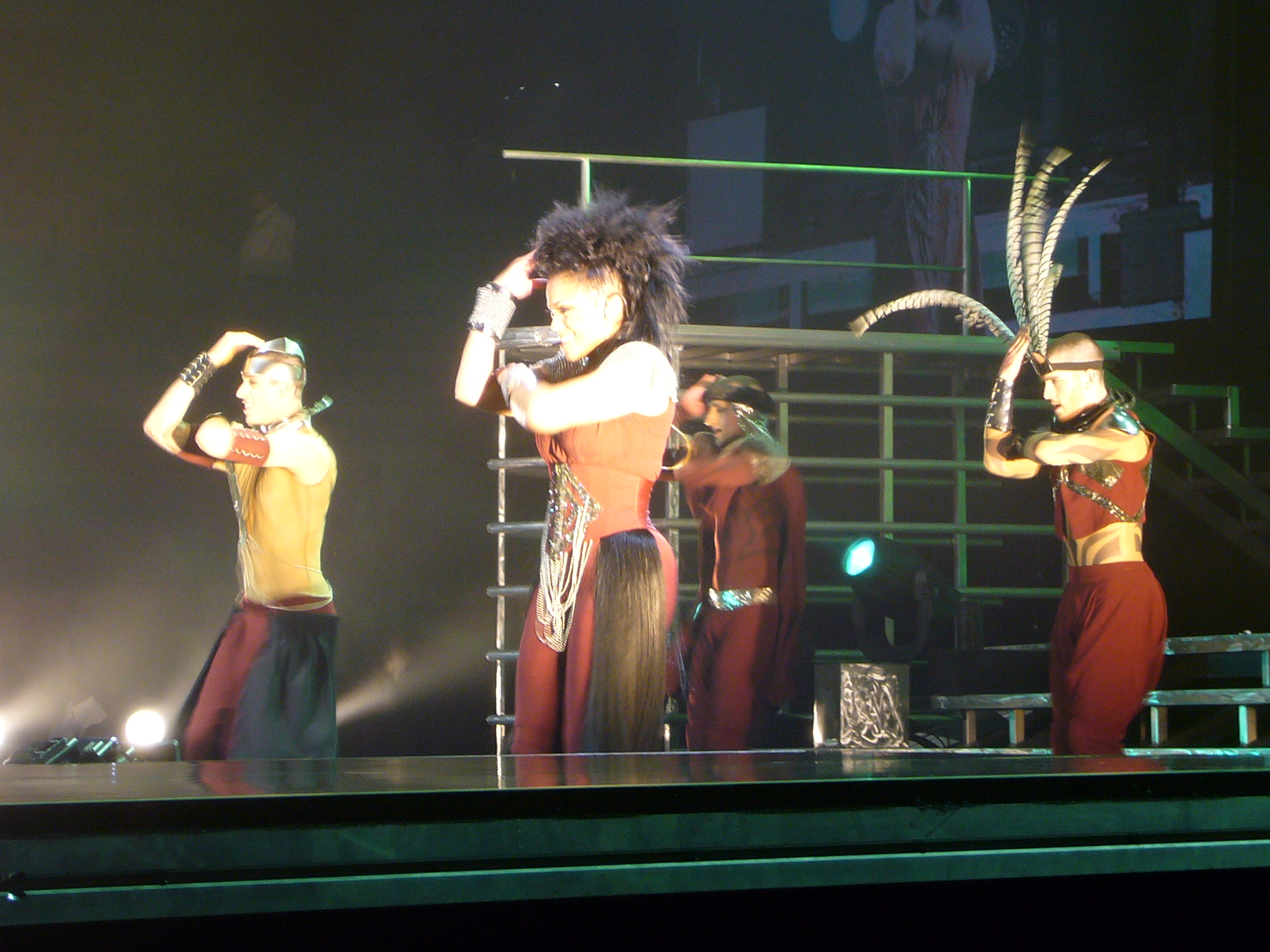
Jackson performing "All For You" on the 2008 Rock Witchu Tour.

On February 1, 2004, Jackson opened her set at the Super Bowl XXXVIII halftime show with a performance of "All for You", wearing a leather gladiator outfit designed by Alexander McQueen. The show also featured 26 dancers, 360 regular band members and a 60-person drum line. Jackson's performance at the Super Bowl became notable after surprise guest Justin Timberlake accidentally exposed her breast, and is referred to as "Nipplegate". Months later, during promotion for her eighth studio album Damita Jo, she performed "All for You" for MSN Music, along with other tracks from the album. The song was also part of the 2008 Rock Witchu Tour, her first concert tour in seven years. The following year, "All for You" was performed during Jackson's set on The X Factor UK in the UK. It was later added to her performance at the 2010 Essence Music Festival, held in New Orleans, Louisiana, which she headlined. On the Number Ones, Up Close and Personal tour in 2011, "All for You" was included on a medley with "Doesn't Really Matter", "Escapade", "Love Will Never Do (Without You)" and "When I Think of You", with Jackson wearing a black tank top, cargo pants, and combat boots; Jane Stevenson of The Winnipeg Sun called it the best medley of the show.

For the 2015–2016 Unbreakable World Tour, the track was again part of the setlist. According to Jason P. Woodbury from The Arizona Republic, "lusty jams" like "All for You" showcased the singer's "bawdy side" during the concert. In April 2016, Jackson announced that due to family planning, all remaining dates of the tour would be postponed. In 2017, the concert tour was resumed in the form of the State of the World Tour, and "All for You" was included on the setlist in a medley with "Escapade" and "When I Think of You". Jackson performed the track as part of a medley of her hits during the 2018 MTV Europe Music Awards ceremony, on November 4, 2018. In 2019, Jackson executed "All for You" on her Janet Jackson: Metamorphosis residency concert in Las Vegas, with a choreography reminiscent of the song's music video as noted by People's Mark Gray, and was also sung by the singer on the Janet Jackson: A Special 30th Anniversary Celebration of Rhythm Nation tour as part of the encore. The track was included on the 2023–2024 Janet Jackson: Together Again tour; Matthew Allen of TheGrio noted that "reverberation from the audience's screams and stomping materialized into the air" when Jackson performed the song's video break. Jackson performed the song on her Janet Jackson: Las Vegas residency (2024–2025), and at the American Music Awards of 2025 as part of a medley with "Someone to Call My Lover" before accepting the Icon Award at the ceremony.

== Other usage ==
"All for You" was performed by Jason Derulo as part of a dance tribute to Jackson on the BET Awards 2015, held at the Microsoft Theater in Los Angeles on June 28, 2015. Ciara and Tinashe, who were also part of the tribute, performed "If" and "The Pleasure Principle" respectively, and all three did a performance of "Rhythm Nation" at the tribute's closing. "All for You" was referenced on the track "Snow on the Beach" by Taylor Swift featuring Lana Del Rey, present on Swift's tenth studio album Midnights (2022), on the line "Now I'm all for you like Janet". Some news outlets pointed out that Jackson sending Swift flowers after the infamous moment at the 2009 MTV Video Music Awards when Kanye West invaded the stage during Swift's acceptance speech may have inspired the inclusion. Jackson later acknowledged the reference by posting a video of herself listening to the track on her social media networks, smiling at the point where the vocalists sing the line mentioning "All for You".

== Track listings and formats ==
US CD and cassette single

1. "All for You" (radio edit) – 4:24
2. "All for You" (video mix) – 4:37

US 12-inch single

A1. "All for You" (Thunderpuss club mix) – 10:28
A2. "All for You" (album version) – 6:31
B1. "All for You" (DJ Quik remix) – 4:29
B2. "All for You" (Top Heavy mix) – 4:05
B3. "All for You" (Rock mix) – 7:20

UK CD single

1. "All for You" (radio edit) – 4:24
2. "All for You" (Top Heavy mix) – 4:06
3. "All for You" (Thunderpuss club mix) – 10:28
4. "All for You" (video)

UK 12-inch single

A1. "All for You" (Thunderpuss club mix) – 10:28
B1. "All for You" (Top Heavy remix) – 4:06
B2. "All for You" (radio edit) – 4:24

UK cassette single

1. "All For You" (radio edit) – 4:24
2. "All For You" (Top Heavy remix) – 4:06
3. "All For You" (Thunderpuss club mix) – 10:28

European CD single

1. "All for You" (radio edit) – 4:23
2. "All for You" (Top Heavy remix) – 4:06

Australasian and Taiwanese CD single

1. "All for You" (radio edit) – 4:24
2. "All for You" (DJ Quik remix) – 4:29
3. "All for You" (Thunderpuss club mix) – 10:28
4. "All for You" (Rock mix) – 7:20
5. "All for You" (Top Heavy mix) – 4:06

Digital EP

1. "All for You" – 6:32
2. "All for You" (Top Heavy remix) – 4:06
3. "All for You" (Thunderpuss club mix) – 10:28

== Credits and personnel ==
Credits are lifted from the All for You album booklet.

Studios

- Recorded and mixed at Flyte Tyme Studios (Edina, Minnesota)
- Mastered at Bernie Grundman Mastering (Hollywood, California)

Personnel

- Janet Jackson – writing, all vocals, production
- Jimmy Jam – writing, all additional instruments, production
- Terry Lewis – writing, all additional instruments, production
- Wayne Garfield – writing
- David Romani – writing
- Mauro Malavasi – writing
- David Barry – guitar
- Alex Richbourg – drum and MIDI programming
- Steve Hodge – recording, mixing
- Brad Yost – recording and mixing assistant
- Xavier Smith – recording and mixing assistant
- Brian "Big Bass" Gardner – mastering
- Mike Bozzi – mastering assistant

== Charts ==
=== Weekly charts ===
Weekly chart performance for "All for You"
Chart (2001)	Peak position
Australia (ARIA)	5
Australian Urban (ARIA)	4
Austria (Ö3 Austria Top 40)	30
Belgium (Ultratop 50 Flanders)	8
Belgium (Ultratop 50 Wallonia)	9
Canada (Nielsen SoundScan)	1
Canada CHR (Nielsen BDS)	1
Croatia International (HRT) (Note: Only a partial archive of the Croatian chart is available so it is possible that the single had a higher peak.)	8
Denmark (Tracklisten)	10
Europe (Eurochart Hot 100)	3
Finland (Suomen virallinen lista)	5
France (SNEP)	3
Germany (GfK)	16
Hungary (MAHASZ)	7
Ireland (IRMA)	15
Italy (FIMI)	5
Japan (Oricon)	77
Netherlands (Dutch Top 40)	5
Netherlands (Single Top 100)	15
New Zealand (Recorded Music NZ)	2
Norway (VG-lista)	12
Poland (Polish Airplay Chart)	1
Portugal (AFP)	8
Romania (Romanian Top 100)	13
Scottish Singles Sales (Official Charts)	11
Spain (Promusicae)	5
South Africa (RISA)	1
Sweden (Sverigetopplistan)	13
Switzerland (Schweizer Hitparade)	7
UK Singles (Official Charts)	3
UK Airplay (Music Week)	1
UK Dance (Official Charts)	2
UK Hip Hop/R&B (Official Charts)	1
US Billboard Hot 100	1
US Adult Pop Airplay (Billboard)	28
US Dance Club Songs (Billboard)	1
US Dance Singles Sales (Billboard)	8
US Hot R&B/Hip-Hop Songs (Billboard)	1
US Pop Airplay (Billboard)	1
US Rhythmic Airplay (Billboard)	3

=== Year-end charts ===
Year-end chart performance for "All for You"
Chart (2001)	Position
Australia (ARIA)	56
Belgium (Ultratop 50 Flanders)	63
Belgium (Ultratop 50 Wallonia)	58
Brazil (Crowley)	13
Canada (Nielsen SoundScan)	42
Canada (Nielsen SoundScan) Import	195
Canada Radio (Nielsen BDS)	13
Europe (Eurochart Hot 100)	53
Europe (European Radio Top 100)	12
France (SNEP)	39
Italy (Musica e dischi)	38
Netherlands (Dutch Top 40)	61
New Zealand (RIANZ)	27
Romania (Romanian Top 100)	86
Switzerland (Schweizer Hitparade)	46
UK Singles (OCC)	71
US Billboard Hot 100	3
US Adult Top 40 (Billboard)	68
US Dance Club Play (Billboard)	3
US Hot R&B/Hip-Hop Singles & Tracks (Billboard)	22
US Mainstream Top 40 (Billboard)	7
US Rhythmic Top 40 (Billboard)	19

=== Decade-end charts ===
Decade-end chart performance for "All for You"
Chart (2000–2009)	Position
US Billboard Hot 100	65

== Certifications ==
Certifications and sales for "All for You"
Region	Certification	Certified units/sales
Australia (ARIA)	Platinum	70,000^{^}
Belgium (BRMA)	Gold	25,000^{*}
France (SNEP)	Gold	250,000^{*}
New Zealand (RMNZ)	Gold	5,000^{*}
New Zealand (RMNZ) digital	Platinum	30,000^{‡}
South Africa (RISA)	Platinum	50,000
United Kingdom (BPI)	Gold	400,000^{‡}
United States (RIAA)	Platinum	1,000,000^{‡}
^{*} Sales figures based on certification alone.^{^} Shipments figures based on certification alone.^{‡} Sales+streaming figures based on certification alone.

== Release history ==
Release dates and formats for "All for You"
Region	Date	Format(s)	Label(s)	Ref(s).
United States	March 6, 2001	Contemporary hit radio; rhythmic contemporary; urban radio	Virgin	
United States	March 13, 2001	Urban adult contemporary radio	Virgin	
Germany	March 26, 2001	Maxi CD	EMI	
France	March 27, 2001	CD	EMI	
United States	March 27, 2001	7-inch vinyl; 12-inch vinyl; cassette; CD	Virgin	
Australia	April 2, 2001	Maxi CD	EMI	
United States	April 2, 2001	Adult contemporary radio	Virgin	
United Kingdom	April 9, 2001	12-inch vinyl; cassette; maxi CD	Virgin	
France	April 10, 2001	Maxi CD	EMI	
Japan	April 18, 2001	Maxi CD	EMI	
