= Boys Don't Cry (The Cure album) =

1980 compilation album by The Cure

Compilation album / Studio album by the Cure
- Released: 5 February 1980
- Recorded: 1977–1979
- Genre: Post-punk
- Length: 36:48
- Label: Fiction
- Producer: Chris Parry

The Cure chronology
Three Imaginary Boys (1979)	Boys Don't Cry (1980)	Seventeen Seconds (1980)

Singles from Boys Don't Cry
- 1. "Killing an Arab" Released: December 1978; 2. "Boys Don't Cry" Released: June 1979; 3. "Jumping Someone Else's Train" Released: November 1979

Boys Don't Cry is the first compilation album and studio album (US release) by the English rock band the Cure. Released in February 1980, this album is composed of several tracks from the band's May 1979 debut album Three Imaginary Boys (which had yet to see a US release) with material from the band's 1978–1979 era.

Behind the scenes of these albums, Bill Smith was the mastermind behind the concepts for both covers, while Chris Parry assumed the role of producer for both projects. Additionally, Tim Pope played a crucial role in directing the music videos for "Killing an Arab" and "Jumping Someone Else's Train", which were later featured in the 1986 video compilation. These behind-the-scenes efforts contributed significantly to the album's artistic vision.

== Release ==
Boys Don't Cry was released on 5 February 1980 by record label Fiction. According to AllMusic, the album "[falls] somewhere between [an] official release and compilation", and was released "in hopes of increasing the band's exposure outside of the U.K."

Early North American pressings of the album used "Jumping Someone Else's Train" as the opening track, pushing the title track down to track 2.

A new version of the title track was released in April 1986.

In the majority of CD releases of the album, "Object" was swapped for "So What", while the final scream in "Subway Song" was trimmed and "World War" was left out altogether.

The cassette version of the album was released in Australia on 7 Records.

== Reception ==
Professional ratings
Review scores
Source	Rating
AllMusic	4.5/5 stars
Q	4/5 stars
The Rolling Stone Album Guide	3.5/5 stars
The Village Voice	B+

Boys Don't Cry has been generally well received by critics. Debra Rae Cohen of Rolling Stone wrote that the album "proves they can transcend their Comp. Lit. 201 (Elementary Angst) scenarios." Robert Christgau of The Village Voice called the band's sound "dry post-punk, never pretty but treated with a properly mnemonic pop overlay", and was more reserved in his praise, adding, "I can look over the titles and recall a phrase from all but a few of these 13 songs. Intelligent phrases they are, too, yet somehow I find it hard to get really excited about them."

In 2000, Boys Don't Cry was voted number 775 in Colin Larkin's All Time Top 1000 Albums. In 2003, the album was ranked at number 442 on Rolling Stone's list of the 500 greatest albums of all time. In a 2012 update of the list, it moved up to number 438.

== Track listing ==
All tracks are written by the Cure (Robert Smith, Michael Dempsey and Lol Tolhurst).

Side A
No.	Title	Source	Length
1.	"Boys Don't Cry"	Single A-side	2:37
2.	"Plastic Passion"	B-side of "Boys Don't Cry"	2:15
3.	"10:15 Saturday Night"	B-side of "Killing an Arab" and from Three Imaginary Boys	3:40
4.	"Accuracy"	From Three Imaginary Boys	2:16
5.	"Object"	From Three Imaginary Boys	3:03
6.	"Jumping Someone Else's Train"	Single A-side	2:58
7.	"Subway Song"	From Three Imaginary Boys	1:54

Side B
No.	Title	Source	Length
1.	"Killing an Arab"	Single A-side	2:22
2.	"Fire in Cairo"	From Three Imaginary Boys	3:21
3.	"Another Day"	From Three Imaginary Boys	3:43
4.	"Grinding Halt"	From Three Imaginary Boys	2:49
5.	"World War"	Previously unreleased track	2:36
6.	"Three Imaginary Boys"	From Three Imaginary Boys	3:14
Total length:			36:48

CD version
No.	Title	Length
1.	"Boys Don't Cry"	2:35
2.	"Plastic Passion"	2:14
3.	"10:15 Saturday Night"	3:38
4.	"Accuracy"	2:16
5.	"So What"	2:30
6.	"Jumping Someone Else's Train"	2:56
7.	"Subway Song"	1:59
8.	"Killing an Arab"	2:22
9.	"Fire in Cairo"	3:21
10.	"Another Day"	3:43
11.	"Grinding Halt"	2:49
12.	"Three Imaginary Boys"	3:14
Total length:		34:08

== Personnel ==
The Cure

- Robert Smith – guitar, vocals, harmonica
- Michael Dempsey – bass guitar, vocals
- Lol Tolhurst – drums

Technical

- Chris Parry – production

== Charts ==
Chart performance for Boys Don't Cry
Chart (1980–1986)	Peak position
Australian Albums (Kent Music Report)	60
New Zealand Albums (RMNZ)	25
UK Albums (Official Charts)	71

== Certifications ==
Certifications for Boys Don't Cry
Region	Certification	Certified units/sales
France (SNEP)	Gold	100,000^{*}
United Kingdom (BPI)	Platinum	300,000^{^}
^{*} Sales figures based on certification alone.^{^} Shipments figures based on certification alone.
