= The Jolt (album) =

Studio album by The Jolt
- Released: July 1978
- Studio: IBC Studios, London
- Genre: Mod revival; punk rock; new wave
- Length: 34:01
- Label: Polydor
- Producer: Vic Coppersmith-Heaven; Chris Parry

The Jolt chronology
The Jolt (1978)	Maybe Tonight EP (1979)

Singles from The Jolt
- 1. "All I Can Do"/"You're Cold" Released: October 1977; 2. "Whatcha Gonna Do About It" Released: 21 April 1978; 3. "I Can't Wait" Released: July 1978

Professional ratings
Review scores
Source	Rating
AllMusic	4/5 stars
Record Mirror	3/5 stars

The Jolt is the sole album by Scottish mod revival band The Jolt, released in July 1978 by Polydor Records.

== Release ==
The first single released by the band was the double-A-sided "You're Cold!" / "All I Can Do". However, "You're Cold!" wasn't included on the original release of the album. "All I Can Do" was included on the album and was released as a single in Germany, with "You're Cold!" as the B-side. The next two singles, a cover of the Small Faces "Whatcha Gonna Do About It" and "I Can't Wait" also flopped.

The album was reissued on CD in 2002 by Captain Mod, a sub-imprint of Captain Oi! Records, and includes the B-sides from The Jolt's singles as well as the four tracks from the EP Maybe Tomorrow.

== Reception ==
Reviewing the album for Record Mirror, Bev Briggs wrote "Three things to get your name in lights – expertise, exploitation or experimentation. The three 'E's to success. Surely The Jolt could have managed one of them. The finesse isn't there – but we accept their apologies because they're a relatively new band. The exploitation, the gimmick also notable by its absence (Thank God!), so you gamble your last greenback on experiment. Sorry, The Jolt don't. Their mistake. A new band can afford to gamble. Can afford to release 10 riotously different tracks on their debut LP. Should risk the tentative walks on the wild Side. The Jolt stagnate in the safety zone, so young and yet so careful."

Reviewing retrospectively for AllMusic, Dave Thompson described The Jolt as "one of the few bands who not only straddled the divide between classic punk and that more specialist sound, they were also the only ones who could give label- (and genre-) mates a run for their money." But that "by the time of their self-titled debut album, however, the Jolt were already consigned to dwell in the Jam's lengthening shadow, a fate that the band themselves seemed to encourage. The best tracks on the album were those that could have sprung from Weller's pen -- and that is precisely where they did get "See Saw," the finest song among the eight bonus tracks appended to the Captain Oi! reissue. The B-side to Jolt's final single, "Maybe Tonight," the song was written for the band by the Jam man himself. But there is so much more to Jolt than an adrenalin rush of Jam-isms. Noisy, exuberant, eminently danceable and absolutely exhilarating, Jolt is the sound of mod at its most potently creative, a record that could have been made in 1965, but was certainly remixed in 1978, to take into account all that had happened since then. Even more importantly, the passing years have chipped none of that original excitement away, and Jolt remains just that...a welcome, thrilling jolt."

== Track listing ==
All tracks are written by Robbie Collins, excepted where noted

No.	Title	Writer(s)	Length
1.	"Mr Radio Man"	Robbie Collins, Jim Doak	2:25
2.	"Whatcha Gonna Do About It"	Brian Potter, Ian Samwell	2:16
3.	"I Can't Wait"		4:10
4.	"Chains"		2:57
5.	"No Excuses"		3:15
6.	"Decoyed"		2:03
7.	"I'm Leaving"	Robbie Collins, Iain Shedden	2:36
8.	"Everybody's the Same"		2:11
9.	"In My Time"		2:48
10.	"Hard Lines"		3:21
11.	"(Can't You Tell) It's Over"	Robbie Collins, Jim Doak	3:22
12.	"All I Can Do"		2:37
Total length:			34:01

2002 CD bonus tracks:

No.	Title	Writer(s)	Length
13.	"You're Cold"		1:52
14.	"Again and Again"		2:23
15.	"Route 66"	Nelson Riddle	2:33
16.	"Maybe Tonight"	Kevin Key	3:03
17.	"I'm in Tears"	Kevin Key	3:19
18.	"See Saw"	Paul Weller	2:42
19.	"Stop Look"	Kevin Key	2:36

== Personnel ==
The Jolt

- Robbie Collins – guitar, vocals, harmonica
- Jim Doak – bass guitar, vocals
- Iain Shedden – drums

Technical

- Hugh Jones – recording engineer
- Vic Coppersmith-Heaven – remix engineer
- David Garland, Nick Cook – assistant engineers
- Tim Turan – mastering
- Jo Mirowski – art direction and design
- Peter McGregor – equipment technician
- John Shaw – photography
- Recorded at IBC Studios, remixed at Morgan Studios and mastered at Strawberry Mastering
