= Killing an Arab =

Single by the Cure
- B-side: "10:15 Saturday Night"
- Released: 22 December 1978
- Recorded: 20 September 1978
- Genre: Post-punk
- Length: 2:21
- Label: Small Wonder, Fiction
- Songwriters: The Cure (Robert Smith, Michael Dempsey, Lol Tolhurst)
- Producer: Chris Parry

The Cure singles chronology
"Killing an Arab" (1978)	"Boys Don't Cry" (1979)

Official audio
- "Killing an Arab" on YouTube

"Killing an Arab" is the debut single by English rock band the Cure. It was recorded at the same time as their first album Three Imaginary Boys (1979), but not included on the album. However, it was included on the band's first US album, Boys Don't Cry (1980).

The song's title and lyrics reference Albert Camus's 1942 novella The Stranger. Because of the title, the song has drawn controversy for what critics have described as promoting violence against Arabs, which songwriter Robert Smith pinned on the public's lack of knowledge regarding the novel. Shortly after its release, Smith said, "It just happened that the main character in the book had actually killed an Arab, but it could have been a Scandinavian or an English bloke." In 2003, Smith acknowledged that, "If I knew it before, I would have called it 'Standing on the Beach'. It would have avoided many troubles."

== Lyrics and music ==
Songwriter Robert Smith said the song "was a short poetic attempt at condensing my impression of the key moments in the 1942 novel L'Étranger (The Stranger) by Albert Camus". The lyrics describe a shooting on a beach, in which the titular Arab is killed by the song's narrator; in Camus's story the protagonist, Meursault, shoots an Arab on a beach, overwhelmed by his surroundings. Meursault is condemned for his honesty about his feelings and is considered an outsider (or "stranger") because "he refuses to lie" and "doesn't play the game".

Upon release, Melody Maker compared the song to "Hong Kong Garden" by Siouxsie and the Banshees. Music critic Ian Birch wrote: "As 'Hong Kong Garden' used a simple Oriental-styled riff to striking effect, so '[Killing An] Arab' conjures up edginess through a Moorish-flavour guitar pattern."

This song lends two of its lines to the titles of one of the Cure's compilation albums, Standing on a Beach, and to its CD/video counterpart Staring at the Sea.

== Reception ==
According to critic Robert Christgau, the release of "Killing an Arab" caused controversy as seemingly promoting violence against Arabs. A 1978 NME article described the song's title as "at first glance irresponsibly racist," with Robert Smith responding, "It's not really racist, if you know what the song is about. It's not a call to kill Arabs."

In the US, the Cure's first compilation of singles, Standing on a Beach (1986), was packaged with a sticker advising against racist usage of the song after a student DJ on WPRB Princeton offended listeners by insensitively introducing the track prior to playing it on the radio in October 1986. Robert Smith and Elektra Records requested that radio stations discontinue airing the song and saw the sticker as a compromise to prevent having to pull the album from sale entirely. Smith said that the song was "being used increasingly by certain reactionary factions of the media, most notably by some particularly brainless DJ's, as a part of a wave of anti-Arab feeling currently existing in some parts of America." Chris Parry, who produced the song, said that "if it was called 'The Stranger', we couldn't have had this problem." Smith conceded in 2003 that he should have titled the song "Standing on the Beach" instead.

== Variations of the lyrics ==
The song saw controversy again during the Persian Gulf War and following the September 11 attacks. The song was revived in 2005, when the Cure performed it at several European festivals. The lyrics, however, were changed from "Killing an Arab" to "Kissing an Arab". Smith added a whole new opening verse when the band performed it at the Royal Albert Hall, London, on 1 April 2006 as "Killing Another". The "killing another" lyric was also used during the 2007–2008 4Tour. The band performed the song as "Killing an Ahab" with lyrics inspired by Herman Melville on 2011's Reflections Tour. During the band's 40th anniversary tour, the lyrics and title were changed back to "Killing an Arab". The band performed the song as "Killing Another" to close out the final show on their tour in December 2022.

== Track listing ==
7-inch single

1. "Killing an Arab"
2. "10:15 Saturday Night"

== Personnel ==
- Michael Dempsey – bass guitar, backing vocals
- Robert Smith – guitar, lead vocals
- Lol Tolhurst – drums
