= Snakes of Shake =

- Origin: Glasgow, Scotland
- Genres: Indie pop, folk, Cajun
- Years active: 1984–1987
- Labels: Tense but Confident, Making Waves
- Spinoffs: Summerhill
- Past members: Seori Burnette; Tzen Vermillion; Sandy Brown; Robert Renfrew; Rhod "Lefty" Burnette; Neil Scott; Iain Shedden; Malcolm Macdonald; Fraser

Snakes of Shake were a Scottish band formed in 1984, whose indie pop sound incorporated cajun and folk influences. They released two albums before splitting up in 1987, with some members subsequently forming Summerhill.

== History ==
The band was formed in Glasgow in 1983 by Seori Burnette. The group at the time of the recording of the first album consisted of the following members: Seori (vocals, guitar, harp), Tzen Vermillion (guitar), Sandy Brown (piano, accordion), Robert Renfrew (bass guitar), and Rhod "Lefty" Burnette (drums).

In February 1984, the band were filmed performing "We Have Got That Feeling" for the Channel 4 television programme, The Tube, on the building site at Queen's Dock, Glasgow of the future SECC, thus becoming the first act to play the venue.

Their debut release was the Southern Cross mini-LP in March 1985, the title track also released as a twelve-inch single.

Vermillion and Rhod Burnette left to be replaced by Neil Scott (guitar) and Iain Shedden (drums, formerly of punk rock band Jolt and The Saints), the band now moving to the Making Waves label. Another release of "Southern Cross" followed in August 1986, the song also appearing on their second album, Gracelands and the Natural Wood, released in July 1987. When Making Waves went into receivership, the band split up, although Seori Burnette, Scott and Shedden formed Summerhill and signed to Polydor Records. Shedden later returned to The Saints and drummed for Giant Sand.

A version of the Snakes reformed in 2017 for one-off performance at the Griffin Bar in Glasgow supporting Summerhill, featuring Seori and Rhod, as well as Jason McSwan (bass) and Oisean Burnette (lead guitar).

== Discography ==
=== Albums ===
- Southern Cross mini-LP (1985), Tense But Confident
- Gracelands and the Natural Wood (1987), Making Waves

=== Singles ===
- "Southern Cross" 12-inch (1985), Tense But Confident
- "Southern Cross" (1986), Making Waves
