= Summerhill (band) =

Summerhill were a Scottish jangle pop band formed by former members of Snakes of Shake. They released two albums before splitting up in 1990. They reformed briefly a few years later.

== History ==
The band was formed in 1987 and 1988 by formed Snakes of Shake members Seori Burnett, Neil Scott, and Iain Shedden, along with bassist Keith Gilles. Early recordings also featured the steel guitar of B.J. Cole. After debut single "I Want You", the band released the Lowdown mini-LP in October 1988 on the Demon Records offshoot Diablo. Shedden then left to rejoin The Saints, also later playing with Giant Sand. Michael Sturgis replaced him, and the band were signed by Polydor Records. Two singles followed before second album West of Here, the band receiving some critical acclaim but little commercial success. After a final single for Polydor, a cover version of The Rolling Stones' "Wild Horses", the band split up.

The band also recorded two David Crosby songs, "It Happens Each Day" and "Lady Friend", for the album Time Between – A Tribute to the Byrds under the name Static in 1991, receiving a 'thanks to' credit on the back cover.

Gilles and Shedden were also in the band 13 Frightened Girls with singer Sumishta Brahm, releasing a sole single, "Lost at Sea" in 1991. Scott went on to join Horse Latitudes. Summerhill reunited in 1994, although only the "No Matter What You Do" single was released before they split up for the last time.

The original Lowdown-era line-up of Summerhill reformed in 2017 for a short UK tour in support of a reissue of their debut; a double CD featuring previously un-released material.

== Discography ==
=== Albums ===
- Lowdown (1989), Diablo
- West of Here (1990), Polydor

=== Singles ===
- "I Want You" (1988), Rocket 5
- "Here I Am" (1989), Polydor
- "Don't Let It Die" (1990), Polydor
- "Wild Horses" (1990), Polydor
- "No Matter What You Do" (1995), Tupelo
