= Jumping Someone Else's Train =

Single by the Cure

from the album Boys Don't Cry
- B-side: "I'm Cold"
- Released: 2 November 1979
- Recorded: 1979
- Genre: Post-punk
- Length: 2:55
- Label: Fiction
- Songwriters: Michael Dempsey; Robert Smith; Lol Tolhurst
- Producer: Chris Parry

The Cure singles chronology
"Boys Don't Cry" (1979)	"Jumping Someone Else's Train" (1979)	"A Forest" (1980)

Audio
- "Jumping Someone Else's Train" on YouTube

"Jumping Someone Else's Train" is a song by English rock band the Cure. Produced by Chris Parry, it was released on 2 November 1979 in the UK as a stand-alone. It later appeared on the US version of the band's first compilation album, Boys Don't Cry (1980).

== History ==
During live performances, mostly during 1979 and 1980, the group would often segue into the instrumental "Another Journey by Train" after finishing this song. Also, they would occasionally segue into "Grinding Halt" from their debut album Three Imaginary Boys. Siouxsie Sioux contributed as backing vocalist to the B-side "I'm Cold".

== Music video ==
The music video shows a speeded up view from the driver's cab of a train journey from London Victoria to Brighton Station.

== Cover versions ==
The song was covered by the Brooklyn-based band Luff for the 2008 American Laundromat Records tribute album Just Like Heaven - A Tribute to The Cure and by Army Navy on Manimal Vinyl's tribute Perfect as Cats: A Tribute to The Cure. The song was also covered by American noise rock band Whores for the band's 2014 split single with Rabbits, consisting entirely of Cure covers.

== Track listing ==
7" vinyl

1. "Jumping Someone Else's Train"
2. "I'm Cold"

== Personnel ==
- Michael Dempsey – bass
- Robert Smith – guitar, vocals
- Lol Tolhurst – drums
- Siouxsie Sioux – backing vocals on "I'm Cold"

== See also ==
- List of train songs
