= The Glow of Love (song) =

1980 single by Change

Single by Change

from the album The Glow of Love
- B-side: "It's A Girl's Affair"
- Released: 1980
- Genre: Dance-pop
- Length: 6:11 (album version); 3:39 (single version)
- Label: RFC; Warner Bros.
- Songwriters: David Romani; Mauro Malavasi; Wayne Garfield
- Producer: Jacques Fred Petrus

Change singles chronology
"A Lover's Holiday" (1980)	"The Glow of Love" (1980)	"Searching" (1980)

"The Glow of Love" is a song performed by Italian-American rhythm and blues/disco group Change, with lead vocals by Luther Vandross. Issued as the second single from their debut album of the same name, the song peaked at #1 on the Billboard dance chart in 1980, where it stayed for nine consecutive weeks. In 2001, Janet Jackson sampled "The Glow of Love" on her #1 hit song "All for You".

== Charts ==
Chart performance for "The Glow of Love"
Chart (1980)	Peak position
US Dance Music/Club Play Singles (Billboard)	1
US R&B Singles (Billboard)	49
