= Boys Don't Cry (The Cure song) =

1979 song by The Cure

Single by the Cure

from the album Boys Don't Cry
- B-side: "Plastic Passion"
- Released: 12 June 1979
- Recorded: 1979
- Genre: Post-punk; new wave; jangle pop
- Length: 2:35
- Label: Fiction
- Songwriters: Robert Smith; Lol Tolhurst; Michael Dempsey
- Producer: Chris Parry

The Cure singles chronology
"Killing an Arab" (1978)	"Boys Don't Cry" (1979)	"Jumping Someone Else's Train" (1979)

Official audio
- "Boys Don't Cry" on YouTube

"Boys Don't Cry (New Voice - New Mix)"
- 1986 UK re-release

Single by The Cure
- B-side: "Pillbox Tales"; "Do the Hansa"
- Released: 21 April 1986
- Length: 2:38
- Label: Fiction
- Songwriters: Robert Smith; Lol Tolhurst; Michael Dempsey
- Producers: Chris Parry; Robert Smith; Dave Allen

The Cure singles chronology
"Close to Me" (1985)	"Boys Don't Cry (New Voice - New Mix)" (1986)	"Why Can't I Be You?" (1987)

Official video
- "Boys Don't Cry" (1986) on YouTube

"Boys Don't Cry" is a song by English rock band the Cure. It was released in the UK as a stand-alone single on 12 June 1979, and was included as the title track on Boys Don't Cry, the American equivalent to Three Imaginary Boys. The song reached No. 22 on the UK singles chart on two occasions, in 1986 and 2026.

== History ==
Written by band members Michael Dempsey, Robert Smith and Lol Tolhurst, the lyrics tell the story of a man who has given up trying to regain the love that he has lost, and tries to disguise his true emotional state. In an interview with the NME, Smith stated:

And as an English boy at the time, you're encouraged not to show your emotion to any degree. And I couldn't help but show my emotions when I was younger. I never found it awkward showing my emotions. I couldn't really continue without showing my emotions; you’d have to be a pretty boring singer to do that. So I kind of made a big thing about it. I thought, 'Well, it’s part of my nature to rail against being told not to do something'.

In April 1986, it was re-released on under the title "New Voice · New Mix", in which the original track was remixed and the vocals re-recorded. It was released to promote Standing on a Beach; however, the original version of the song appears on the album. The 12" version "New Voice · Club Mix" was included on the 2018 remastered Deluxe Edition of Mixed Up. The 7" mix of the new version went out-of-print until 2026 when it, alongside the 12" mix and B-sides, were released to streaming sites on 30 January 2026, with a physical release forthcoming on 21 April 2026.

== Music video ==
The video, released in 1986 to promote the "New Voice New Mix" re-recording, features three children, actors Mark Heatley, Christian Andrews and Russell Ormes miming the song. Behind a curtain, Smith, Tolhurst and Dempsey (in his only appearance with the band since his 1979 departure), appear as the children's shadows, with red eyes, an effect that was attained by painting their eyelids with fluorescent paint.

== Reception ==
"Boys Don't Cry" is widely regarded as one of the Cure's best songs. In 2019, Billboard ranked the song number four on their list of the 40 greatest Cure songs, and in 2023, Mojo ranked the song number three on their list of the 30 greatest Cure songs.

== Legacy ==
The 1999 film Boys Don't Cry took its title from the song; a cover version, performed by Nathan Larson, was used as the title song for the film. The song has appeared in numerous other films, including The Wedding Singer, 50 First Dates, Starter for Ten, I Do, Nick and Norah's Infinite Playlist, Friends with Benefits (a cover version, performed by Grant-Lee Phillips, is used in the soundtrack of the film) and Me and You. The song also featured in the second season of the TV sitcom How I Met Your Mother. The post-grunge band Oleander covered the song on their 1999 album February Son.

In 2018, the song was the subject of an episode of the BBC Radio 4 series Soul Music. The programme featured an interview with Tolhurst about the history of the song.

In 2020, the song appeared during the episode "Fagan" of the Netflix show The Crown.

American band I Dont Know How but They Found Me released a cover of the song in November 2021 as part of the deluxe version of their album Razzmatazz.

The song was performed live for the 1000th time on December 13, 2022 at the OVO Arena in Wembley, London, England.

Despite it not being much of a hit during its original run, it has since become one of The Cure's best known tracks, and it is currently their most streamed track on Spotify with over one billion streams as of January 2026.

== Track listings ==
7" vinyl

1. "Boys Don't Cry" – 2:34
2. "Plastic Passion" – 2:15

1986

7" vinyl

1. "Boys Don't Cry" (New Voice · New Mix) – 2:38
2. "Pill Box Tales" – 2:54

12" vinyl

1. "Boys Don't Cry" (New Voice · Club Mix) – 5:31
2. "Pill Box Tales" – 2:56
3. "Do the Hansa" – 2:40

== Personnel ==
- Michael Dempsey – bass guitar
- Robert Smith – vocals, electric guitar
- Lol Tolhurst – drums

== Charts ==
Chart (1979–80)	Peak position
Australia (Kent Music Report)	99
US Hot Dance Club Play (Billboard)	70

"Boys Don't Cry (New Voice · New Mix)"

Chart (1986)	Peak position
Australia (Kent Music Report)	26
Belgium (Ultratop 50 Flanders)	17
France (SNEP)	28
Netherlands (Dutch Top 40)	37
Netherlands (Single Top 100)	27
Spain (AFYVE)	31
UK Singles Chart	22
West Germany (GfK)	19

Chart (2026)	Peak position
France (SNEP)	199
Global Excl. US (Billboard)	187
Ireland (IRMA)	48
Lithuania (AGATA)	100
Sweden Heatseeker (Sverigetopplistan)	12
UK Singles (Official Charts)	22

== Certifications ==
Region	Certification	Certified units/sales
Brazil (Pro-Música Brasil)	Gold	30,000^{‡}
Denmark (IFPI Danmark)	Gold	45,000^{‡}
Germany (BVMI)	Gold	300,000^{‡}
Italy (FIMI)	Platinum	100,000^{‡}
New Zealand (RMNZ)	2× Platinum	60,000^{‡}
Portugal (AFP)	Gold	20,000^{‡}
Spain (Promusicae)	Platinum	60,000^{‡}
United Kingdom (BPI)	2× Platinum	1,200,000^{‡}
United States (RIAA)	Platinum	1,000,000^{‡}
^{‡} Sales+streaming figures based on certification alone.
