= Iain Shedden =

- Born: 6 January 1957; Lanark, Scotland
- Died: 16 October 2017 (aged 60) Sydney, New South Wales, Australia
- Genres: Rock, punk
- Occupation: Drummer
- Years active: 1976–2017

Iain Shedden (6 January 1957 – 16 October 2017) was a Scottish-born Australian musician and journalist.

Shedden was born in Lanark, Scotland. He worked for the local newspaper in his home town of Wishaw in North Lanarkshire while playing with his first band, The Jolt. In 1982 he was invited to play in Europe with the Australian band the Saints and drummed with them periodically through the 1980s. as well as Snakes of Shake and Summerhill.

In 1992 Shedden migrated to Australia, initially to seek work as a musician. With opportunities in the music industry limited, Shedden returned to journalism and was employed at The Australian — initially as a sub-editor and later as the music editor. Shedden worked for The Australian until his sudden and unexpected death from haemopericardium, caused by a thoracic aortic aneurysm rupture, on 16 October 2017.

The ARIA Awards has since paid tribute to Shedden, naming their media suite in his honour. An award at the National Live Music Awards has also been named in his honour. Introduced for the December 2018 event, “The Sheddy” recognises the best Live Drummer in the country. Shedden earlier served as a judge for the awards.
