= Ellery Bop =

British indie rock band

- Origin: Liverpool, England
- Genres: Indie rock

Ellery Bop were a 1980s indie rock band with Liverpool and Irish roots.

== Lineup ==
- Jamie Farrell : vocalist/lead guitarist
- Robbie Butcher : bass guitar
- Kev Connolly : percussion
- Mark Parry : drums

== Career ==
The band toured infrequently (with Killing Joke) but recorded several sessions for the BBC with John Peel and Janice Long. A John Peel session was recorded live at the London I.C.A. The band claimed bands such as MC5, The Stooges, Ramones, Heartbreakers and The Clash as their influences.

== Discography ==
Chart placings shown are from the UK Indie Chart.

=== Singles ===
- "Hit the Moon" (June 1981)
- "Ringing" (March 1982) (featuring; Ian Broudie of the Lightning Seeds on bass) (No. 46)
- "We Deny" (November 1982)
- Fire in Reflection EP (1983)
- Torn Apart EP (1985)
- "Ellery Bop - Torn Apart" (music video 1985)
