= Wayne Garfield =

American singer-songwriter (1952–2022)

- Born: January 21, 1952
- Died: September 9, 2022 (aged 70)
- Occupations: songwriter, vocalist, producer

Wayne K. Garfield (January 21, 1952 – September 9, 2022) was an American composer, collaborating songwriter, vocalist, social businessman, community activist and producer, who was born in 1952 in New York City. He co-founded of the music collective Change, which launched the career of Luther Vandross with the hit song "The Glow of Love" which became #1 on the Billboard Dance/Disco Chart in the summer of 1980.In addition, Garfield’s songs appear on Platinum-Plus recordings by Luther Vandross, J. Cole, Now! 7, and Janet Jackson (2010 Best of Number Ones; 2010 Icon: Number Ones, 2009 Number Ones, 2009 The Best). Garfield was an active participant in the National Basketball Association (NBA), and internationally as a player representative. Among his successful clients were NBA Summer League standout, Chedney Gray and Jimmy Baxter, who in 2006 was the recipient of the France (Pro, A) basketball league’s Sixth Man of the Year and Newcomer of the Year. Garfield died on September 9, 2022, at the age of 70.

== Career ==
Garfield's career started as a singer with The Voices of East Harlem a rock and soul group. The group was formed in 1969 in Harlem, New York City. The group recorded with Elektra, Just Sunshine, and Motown. The Voices of East Harlem was a 20-member ensemble aged 12 to 21. The group worked with producers Leroy Hutson and Curtis Mayfield. Garfield was a member of the Change collected. He has composed music for Janet Jackson, Luther Vandross, Roy Ayers, Kurtis Blow, Taj Mahal, Dee Dee Bridgewater, soundtrack for the movie Coffy, Salt-N-Pepa, Aretha Franklin, and Fela Kuti. He has functioned in the capacity of composer, lyricist, manager and arranger for three decades. In 1973 Garfield wrote the soundtrack and vocals for the movie Coffy. The movie was directed by Jack Hill.

He has worked with Angela Winbush and Debye Burrell to develop their careers.

Garfield has worked with Carl Clay and he is one of the co-founders of Black Spectrum Theater in South Jamaica Queens, New York City. The theatre was founded in 1970s.

In 1986 Garfield united Kurtis Blow and Bob Dylan in producing "Street Rock", which became a hip-hop crossover.

In 2002, Garfield formed the advocacy group "Writers Rule Coalition", for songwriters to gain award recognition.

In 2003, through the direct efforts of Garfield, the National Academy of Recording Arts and Sciences Board of Trustees awarded the Winners Certificate to songwriters and producers of Grammy nominated and winning recordings containing samples. Which gave writers and producers recognition for their contribution.

== Discography ==
=== Composer ===
- 2019 Everything and More: The Complete Collection 1980–2019; (Change Collective)
- 2018 KOD; J. Cole
- 2014 The Box Set Series; Luther Vandross
- 2013 12" Disco: The Collection
- 2011 Love & Revolution; Nicola Conte
- 2010 Best of Number Ones; Janet Jackson
- 2010 Icon: Number Ones; Janet Jackson
- 2009 Louder; Big Ali Recording
- 2009 Number Ones; Janet Jackson
- 2009 Old School Jams, Vol. 8
- 2009 The Best; Janet Jackson
- 2008 Drew's Famous Just Dance & Party; The Hit Crew
- 2008 From A Distant Point Of View 2nd Edition; Geb.El
- 2008 Sunset Chill: Ibiza Edition
- 2006 Forever, for Always, for Luther, Vol. 2
- 2006 In the House of Love; Dimitri from Paris
- 2005 Cafe Ibiza, Vol. 6: The Ambient & Chill Out Album
- 2005 Complete 80's Soul Weekender
- 2005 Nova Latino, Vol. 2
- 2005 Rock On: Breakout Years Luther Vandross
- 2004 Artist Collection: Luther Vandross; Luther Vandross
- 2004 From Janet. To Damita Jo: The Videos [Amaray]; Janet Jackson
- 2004 From Janet. To Damita Jo: The Videos [Jewelcase]; Janet Jackson
- 2004 In the House; Dimitri from Paris
- 2004 Smooth Sax Tribute to Janet Jackson
- 2004 The String Quartet Tribute to Janet Jackson; Vitamin String Quartet
- 2003 Best of Change [WEA International]; Change
- 2003 Club Hits 2000-2003
- 2003 Destination Motherland: The Roy Ayers Anthology Roy Ayers
- 2003 Ibiza: The History of House
- 2003 Live Radio City Music Hall 2003 - Luther Vandross
- 2003 Magnum Opus, Vol. 3
- 2003 Party Tyme Karaoke: Pop Party Pack; Sybersound
- 2003 Pure Energy Party Pack
- 2003 Smooth Sax Tribute to Luther Vandross
- 2003 The Essential Luther Vandross; Luther Vandross
- 2003 The Return of Funk Phenomena
- 2002 Boom Box Flava
- 2002 Elemental Chill, Vol. 1: Fire
- 2002 Party Deluxe
- 2002 Shining Symbol: The Ultimate Collection Roy Ayers
- 2002 Stop to Love; Luther Vandross
- 2002 Superclub Presents: Lounge
- 2002 Tom Joyner Presents: The Old School Mix Returns
- 2002 Ultimate Cheeky Party Album
- 2001 All for You; Janet Jackson
- 2001 Chartbuster Karaoke: The Best of Female Pop 2001, Vol. 2
- 2001 Creating Patterns; 4hero
- 2001 DJ's Choice: Pop Princess
- 2001 Drew's Famous Hip Pop Today; Drew's Famous
- 2001 Drew's Famous Pop Hits 2002; Drew's Famous
- 2001 Festivalbar 2001: Compilation Rossa
- 2001 Limited Edition Geb.El
- 2001 Millennium Jazz, Vol. 5
- 2001 More Cold Feet
- 2001 Now That's What I Call Music! 7
- 2001 Now! 6 [Canada]
- 2001 Party Tyme Karaoke: Super Hits, Vol. 3 Sybersound
- 2001 Room Service, Vol. 1
- 2001 Sing a Happy Song: The Warner Bros. Recordings; Taj Mahal (Vocals & Background)
- 2001 Smash Hits Summer 2001
- 2001 The Annual: Millennium Edition
- 2001 Upside Down/Music of Many Colours; Fela Kuti
- 2000 2000 Black: The Good Good
- 2000 Club Hits 2000
- 2000 Disco's Greatest Hits
- 2000 Fresh Hits '99
- 2000 Galaxy Weekend
- 2000 Love 2 Dance [Import]
- 2000 Massive Dance Hits 2000
- 2000 Old School Funk Box Set
- 2000 Old School Funk, Vol. 3
- 2000 Party Zone, Vol. 5
- 2000 Sampled
- 2000 Suspicious Minds [Time Music]; Candi Staton
- 1999 40 Classic Dance Anthems; Dave Pearce
- 1999 Ayia Napa Discovered
- 1999 Boom, Vol. 2
- 1999 Celebration 2000 [Enigma]
- 1999 Club Mix 2000 [K-Tel]
- 1999 Cream Ibiza: Arrivals/Llegadas
- 1999 Disco Blueprints: The Original Inspirational Underground Disco Anthems
- 1999 Disco Box
- 1999 Fat Pop Hits
- 1999 Kiss Clublife
- 1999 Kolasi 2000
- 1999 Now Dance 2000
- 1999 Now Phats What I Small Music; Phats & Small
- 1999 Soul Weekender Anthems
- 1998 A Rose Is Still a Rose; Aretha Franklin
- 1998 Collection; Roy Ayers
- 1998 Dance with Angels
- 1998 Here We Go Again; Aretha Franklin
- 1998 Pieces of a Man AZ
- 1998 The Very Best of Change; Change
- 1997 Best Disco Album in the Universe, Vol. 5
- 1997 Free to Be, Vol. 10
- 1997 Jewelz O.C.
- 1997 The Best of Roy Ayers: Love Fantasy; Roy Ayers (Vocals, & Vocals Background)
- 1995 Evolution: The Polydor Anthology; Roy Ayers (Arranger, Vocals, Vocals Background), Bass, Composer, Featured Artist
- 1995 Love Ballads [Connoisseur Collection]
- 1995 Naked and True; Randy Crawford
- 1995 Representin' the Streets
- 1995 The Best of Candi Staton [Warner Bros.]; Candi Staton
- 1995 Young Hearts Run Free: The Best of Candi Staton; Candi Staton
- 1994 The Best of Kurtis Blow; Kurtis Blow; Vocals (Background)
- 1994 The Sun Rises in the East; Jeru the Damaja
- 1993 Searching to Find the One; Unlimited Touch (Hand clapping)
- 1992 The Disco Years, Vol. 3: Boogie Fever
- 1989 The Best of Luther Vandross: The Best of Love; Luther Vandross
- 1986 Kingdom Blow; Kurtis Blow; Vocals (Background)
- 1981 You'll Never Know; Hi Gloss Producer, Assistant Producer, Composer
- 1980 Music of Many Colours; Roy Ayers / Fela Kuti Arranger
- 1980 The Glow of Love; Change
- 1979 Chance; Candi Staton
- 1973 Virgo Red; Roy Ayers / Roy Ayers Ubiquity

=== Vocals ===
- 1986 Kingdom Blow Kurtis Blow Vocals (Background)
- 1980 Kurtis Blow Kurtis Blow Main Personnel, Vocals (Background)
- 1979 Fever Roy Ayers
- 1977 Evolution (The Most Recent) Taj Mahal
- 1975 A Tear to a Smile Roy Ayers / Roy Ayers Ubiquity album, Arranger, Vocals, Composer
- 1974 Change Up the Groove Roy Ayers / Roy Ayers Ubiquity album, Arranger, Vocals, Vocals (Background), Performer, Composer
- 1973 Coffy Roy Ayers/Vocals, Featured Artist, Primary Artist/ [Coffy Original Motion Picture Soundtrack]
- 1973 Red, Black & Green Roy Ayers / Roy Ayers Ubiquity Vocals (Background)

=== Record Labels ===
- Polydor Records
- Universal Records
- Universal Music Group International
- Elektra
- Just Sunshine

== Awards ==
- • 2002 American Society of Composers, Authors and Publishers (ASCAP) Award for Most Airplay on Pop and R&B Radio “All for You” by Janet Jackson
- 2002 Grammy Award for Best Dance Recording “All for You” by Janet Jackson
- 1980 Billboard Disco Chart Longevity
