= The Trial (Czech band) =

The TRIAL
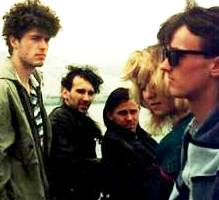
- The TRIAL in 1991 on UK Tour

Background information
- Origin: Beroun, Czechoslovakia
- Genres: Synthpop; Technopop; Electronic
- Years active: 1988–1993; 2009–present
- Website: www.thetrial.cz

The TRIAL is a Czech music band that existed from 1988 to 1993. The band was found in Beroun (Czech Republic) from where their music spread through recordings, concerts and other media to whole Czechoslovakia. A musical genre of The TRIAL was called technopop (or synthpop). The band itself espoused to the legacy of electronic pop scene of the 1980s. Emphasis of their work lied in working in studio and sound experimenting. The TRIAL released two singles and two albums and also three videoclips for TV and two concerts shows. As the top of the success became the encouragement from the British DJ John Peel, which personally invited the band to England and played the songs of The TRIAL on BBC Radio One and Radio Luxembourg. In 2009, MaxOne created for the band two video clips and remixed their unpublished tracks "Let’s Shake Down" and "Pull It Back".

== Discography ==
=== Albums and singles ===
- "In The Fiction Press" - 1990
- Pictures - 1991
- "No Love in Future" - 1991
- "You And Darkness" - 1992
- "Let’s Shake Down" - 2009
- "Pull It Back" - 2009

=== Video clips ===
- Terrible Scream - 1988
- In The Fiction Press - 1990
- Sex Story - 1991
- Let’s Shake Down - 2009
- Pull It Back - 2009
