= Three Imaginary Boys =

Studio album by the Cure
- Released: 8 May 1979
- Recorded: 1978–79
- Studios: Morgan, London
- Genres: Post-punk; new wave; pop-punk; power pop
- Length: 35:31
- Label: Fiction
- Producer: Chris Parry

The Cure chronology
Three Imaginary Boys (1979)	Boys Don't Cry (1980)

Singles from Three Imaginary Boys
- 1. "Grinding Halt/Meat Hook (Promo)" Released: May 1979 (UK); 2. "10:15 Saturday Night" Released: 1980 (France)

Three Imaginary Boys is the debut studio album by the English rock band the Cure, released on 8 May 1979 by Fiction Records, and reached number 44 on the UK Albums Chart. It was later released in the United States, Canada, and Australia with a different track listing as a compilation album titled Boys Don't Cry.

== Production and content ==
The record company decided which songs were put on the album and running order, as well as the cover artwork, without Robert Smith's consent. For all Cure albums since, Smith has ensured that he is given complete creative control over the final product before it goes on sale. The "Foxy Lady" soundcheck, with vocals sung by Michael Dempsey, was not supposed to be on the album, and was removed for the American release. Smith has stated that "songs like 'Object' and 'World War' and our cover of 'Foxy Lady' were [producer] Chris Parry's choice".

In a Spin interview from 1987, Smith said he was never happy with the album. He said he "was very angst-ridden, very dislocated", at the time of its creation, and said he did not think there was "any sense of emotion on that first album at all. A lot of it was very superficial—I didn't even like it at the time. There were criticisms made that it was very lightweight, and I thought they were justified. Even when we'd make it, I wanted to do something I thought had more substance to it." He also said the album's production was rushed, with him writing lyrics to songs while he was singing them.

== Release ==
Three Imaginary Boys was originally released on 8 May 1979 by record label Fiction.

The album was reissued on 29 November 2004 and featured a second disc of unreleased material, including songs recorded under the band name Easy Cure with Porl Thompson. It was originally supposed to be released in early 2004 along with the band's next three studio albums (Seventeen Seconds, Faith and Pornography), but was delayed multiple times before being released by itself at the end of 2004. As it featured a variety of old songs, it was the only deluxe edition by the band that did not include an alternate version of each song on the first disc. Some of the early booklets in the reissue had missing lyrics, which were made available on the Cure's website in PDF form. All copies since contain the lyrics.

A one-disc reissue was released on 5 September 2005, containing only the original album. It was also released in the standard jewel case rather than in a box. In some countries, the deluxe edition has become a collector's item as production was phased out, being replaced by the more economic single-disc version.

== Reception ==
Professional ratings
Review scores
Source	Rating
AllMusic	4.5/5 stars
Blender	3/5 stars
The Guardian	4/5 stars
The Irish Times	3/5 stars
Pitchfork	8.7/10
Record Mirror	4.5/5 stars
The Rolling Stone Album Guide	3.5/5 stars
Smash Hits	8/10
Sounds	5/5 stars
Uncut	4/5 stars

Despite Smith's displeasure with the record, Three Imaginary Boys was well received critically at the time of its release. Sounds' Dave McCullough praised it in a 5-star review and noted: "The Cure are going somewhere different on each track, the ideas are startling and disarming." McCullough noted the variety of the material and qualified "Grinding Halt" as a "pop song that reminds you of the Isley Brothers or the Buzzcocks." Red Starr, writing in Smash Hits, described the album as a "brilliant, compelling debut." However, NME's Paul Morley did not share the same point of view and wrote: "Most of the time, it's a voice catching its breath, a cautiously primitive riff guitar, toy drumming and a sprightly bass."

Chris True of AllMusic retrospectively called the album "a very strong debut" and a "semi-detached bit of late-'70s English pop-punk". Nitsuh Abebe of Pitchfork likened the album to a "new wave Wire... [or] Joy Division" and called it "as original a record as anything else to spin off from the tail end of punk." He also called the album "spiky post-punk." BBC Music critic Simon Morgan said "Smith was forging his own take on the post-punk zeitgeist," while author Martin C. Strong said it "remains among the Cure's finest work," adding that "their strangely accessible post-punk snippets lent an air of suppressed melancholy." The album was also described as "a collection of melodic but slightly kooky power-pop" by Chris Gerard of PopMatters.

== 50th anniversary plans ==
On 14 October 2024, Robert Smith announced plans for retiring in 2029 following the 50th anniversary of Three Imaginary Boys. "I'm 70 in 2029, and that's the 50th anniversary of the first Cure album [Three Imaginary Boys]. If I make it that far, that's it. In the intervening time, I'd like to include playing concerts as part of the overall plan of what we’re going to do. I've loved it; the last 10 years of playing shows have been the best 10 years of being in the band. It pisses all over the other 30-odd years! It’s been great."

== Track listing ==
All tracks are written by the Cure (Robert Smith, Michael Dempsey and Lol Tolhurst), except "Foxy Lady" written by Jimi Hendrix.

Side A
No.	Title	Length
1.	"10:15 Saturday Night"	3:42
2.	"Accuracy"	2:17
3.	"Grinding Halt"	2:49
4.	"Another Day"	3:44
5.	"Object"	3:03
6.	"Subway Song"	2:00

Side B
No.	Title	Length
1.	"Foxy Lady" (The Jimi Hendrix Experience cover)	2:29
2.	"Meat Hook"	2:17
3.	"So What"	2:37
4.	"Fire in Cairo"	3:23
5.	"It's Not You"	2:49
6.	"Three Imaginary Boys"	3:17
7.	"The Weedy Burton"	1:04

Deluxe Edition bonus disc
No.	Title	Length
1.	"I Want to Be Old" (SAV studio demo, October 1977; previously unreleased)	2:36
2.	"I'm Cold" (SAV studio demo, November 1977)	3:21
3.	"Heroin Face" (live in The Rocket, Crawley, December 1977; previously available on Curiosity)	2:40
4.	"I Just Need Myself" (PSL studio demo, January 1978; previously unreleased)	2:14
5.	"10:15 Saturday Night" (Robert Smith home demo, February 1978)	4:36
6.	"The Cocktail Party" (group home demo, March 1978; previously unreleased)	4:17
7.	"Grinding Halt" (group home demo, April 1978)	3:31
8.	"Boys Don't Cry" (Chestnut studio demo, May 1978; previously available on Curiosity)	2:45
9.	"It's Not You" (Chestnut studio demo, May 1978)	3:16
10.	"10:15 Saturday Night" (Chestnut studio demo, May 1978)	3:41
11.	"Fire in Cairo" (Chestnut studio demo, May 1978)	3:42
12.	"Winter" (Three Imaginary Boys studio outtake, October 1978; previously unreleased)	3:46
13.	"Faded Smiles" (also known as "I Don't Know"; Three Imaginary Boys studio outtake, October 1978; previously unreleased)	2:16
14.	"Play with Me" (Three Imaginary Boys studio outtake, October 1978; previously unreleased)	3:30
15.	"World War" (on early copies of Boys Don't Cry)	2:38
16.	"Boys Don't Cry" (also on Boys Don't Cry)	2:37
17.	"Jumping Someone Else's Train" (also on Boys Don't Cry)	2:59
18.	"Subway Song" (live in Nottingham, October 1979; previously available on Curiosity)	2:27
19.	"Accuracy" (live in Nottingham, October 1979)	2:36
20.	"10:15 Saturday Night" (live in Nottingham, October 1979)	4:38

== Personnel ==
The Cure

- Robert Smith – guitar, lead vocals (all but "Foxy Lady"), harmonica ("Subway Song")
- Michael Dempsey – bass, backing and lead ("Foxy Lady") vocals
- Lol Tolhurst – drums

Additional personnel

- Porl Thompson – lead guitar, backing vocals (1–4, 6, 7 of bonus disc)

Technical

- David Dragon – sleeve illustrations
- Michael J. Dutton – "assistant"
- Martyn Goddard – sleeve photography
- Mike Hedges – engineering
- Connie Jude – sleeve illustrations
- Chris Parry – production
- Bill Smith – art direction, sleeve design, additional photography

== Certifications and sales ==
Region	Certification	Certified units/sales
Australia	—	30,000
United Kingdom (BPI) 2005 release	Silver	60,000^{‡}
^{‡} Sales+streaming figures based on certification alone.
