= 10:15 Saturday Night =

- Cover of the French single

Single by the Cure

from the album Three Imaginary Boys
- A-side: "Killing an Arab"
- Released: June 1979
- Genre: Pop-punk
- Length: 3:42
- Label: Fiction
- Songwriters: Robert Smith; Michael Dempsey; Lol Tolhurst
- Producer: Chris Parry

Official audio
- "10:15 Saturday Night" on YouTube

"10:15 Saturday Night" is a song by the English rock band the Cure. It was the B-side to their December 1978 single "Killing an Arab" as well as the opening track of their debut album Three Imaginary Boys. It was also released in France as a single, with the track "Accuracy" as the B-side. It has been performed live during most of their shows since its release, and was included on their 1984 album Concert: The Cure Live.

A promotional video, directed by Piers Bedford, was the band's first music video. (Note: Piers had directed a number of previous films and the following year would direct the video for Siouxsie and the Banshees' "Happy House".)

== Background ==
According to interviews in the booklet for the Deluxe Edition of Three Imaginary Boys, the demo of the song is what caught Chris Parry's attention in 1978 and led him to sign the band to his newly founded record company, Fiction. The track was written by Robert Smith at the age of 16 one evening while sitting at the kitchen table feeling "utterly morose" watching the tap dripping and drinking his dad's homemade beer. It was first performed as part of sets performed by Easy Cure at gigs around the band's local area of Crawley.

== Critical reception ==
In a retrospective review for AllMusic, Bill Janovitz compared the song's sound to the bands Gun Club, Wire, and Gang of Four, citing its "stark and edgy blasts of guitars, a country-blues drum beat, stark dynamics, and Robert Smith's vocal approach." He wrote that song's percussion mirrors the sound of a clock ticking, noting that its "music magnifies the narrator's dilemma from mere melancholy loneliness to a maddening desperation."

"10:15 Saturday Night" is widely regarded as one of the Cure's best songs. In 2019, Billboard ranked the song number ten on their list of the 40 greatest Cure songs, and in 2023, Mojo ranked the song number five on their list of the 30 greatest Cure songs.

== Samples and cover versions ==
The song was sampled by Massive Attack on their cover of "Man Next Door" from their 1998 album Mezzanine. It was also covered by the Living End on their EP It's for Your Own Good.

== Other uses ==
The song is the opening of the 2026 anime Cyberpunk: Edgerunners 2.
