= The Jolt =

Scottish band

- Origin: Wishaw, North Lanarkshire, Scotland
- Genres: Mod revival; punk rock; new wave
- Years active: 1976–1979
- Labels: Polydor
- Past members: Robbie Collins; Jim Doak; Iain Shedden; Kevin Kay

The Jolt were a Scottish band formed in Wishaw, Scotland in September 1976.

== History ==
At the time, Robbie Collins and Jim Doak were clerks in the civil service and Iain Shedden was a music journalist for a local paper. They had known each other from their schooldays at Wishaw High School and had been thinking about forming a band since the beginning of 1975.

They started out playing 1960s covers and then sped up their music, playing a mix of punk rock and power pop. The lineup was Collins on guitar and vocals, Doak on bass and vocals and Iain Shedden on drums. The band built up its following playing at the Crown Hotel, Wishaw. They enjoyed moderate success during the punk and early new wave era.

They moved to London, England and signed to Polydor Records on a reported four-year deal worth £90,000, making them the first Scottish punk/new wave band to sign with a major label. The first single released was "All I Can Do" in September 1977, before releasing a cover of the Small Faces' "Whatcha Gonna Do About It" in April the following year. However, they flopped, as did the band's sole eponymous album, released in July 1978. Soon after the album's release, the band recruited a second guitarist, Kevin Kay.

They had opened for bands such as The Jam, The Saints, Generation X and The Motors. Paul Weller of The Jam became a big fan of the band, and the two bands often collaborated, with The Jolt opening for The Jam, and Weller even wrote a single for The Jolt, "See Saw", released in June 1979 on the EP Maybe Tonight. However, The Jolt were seen as poor copy of The Jam, always in their shadow, and the band split soon afterwards. They were precursors to the mod revival, which ironically came to fruition around 1979.

== Discography ==
=== Albums ===
- The Jolt (1978)

=== Extended plays ===
- Maybe Tonight (1979)

=== Singles ===
- "You're Cold!" / "All I Can Do" (1977)
- "Whatcha Gonna Do About It" (1978)
- "I Can't Wait" (1978)
