= Justin Lockey =

British musician and record producer (born 1980)

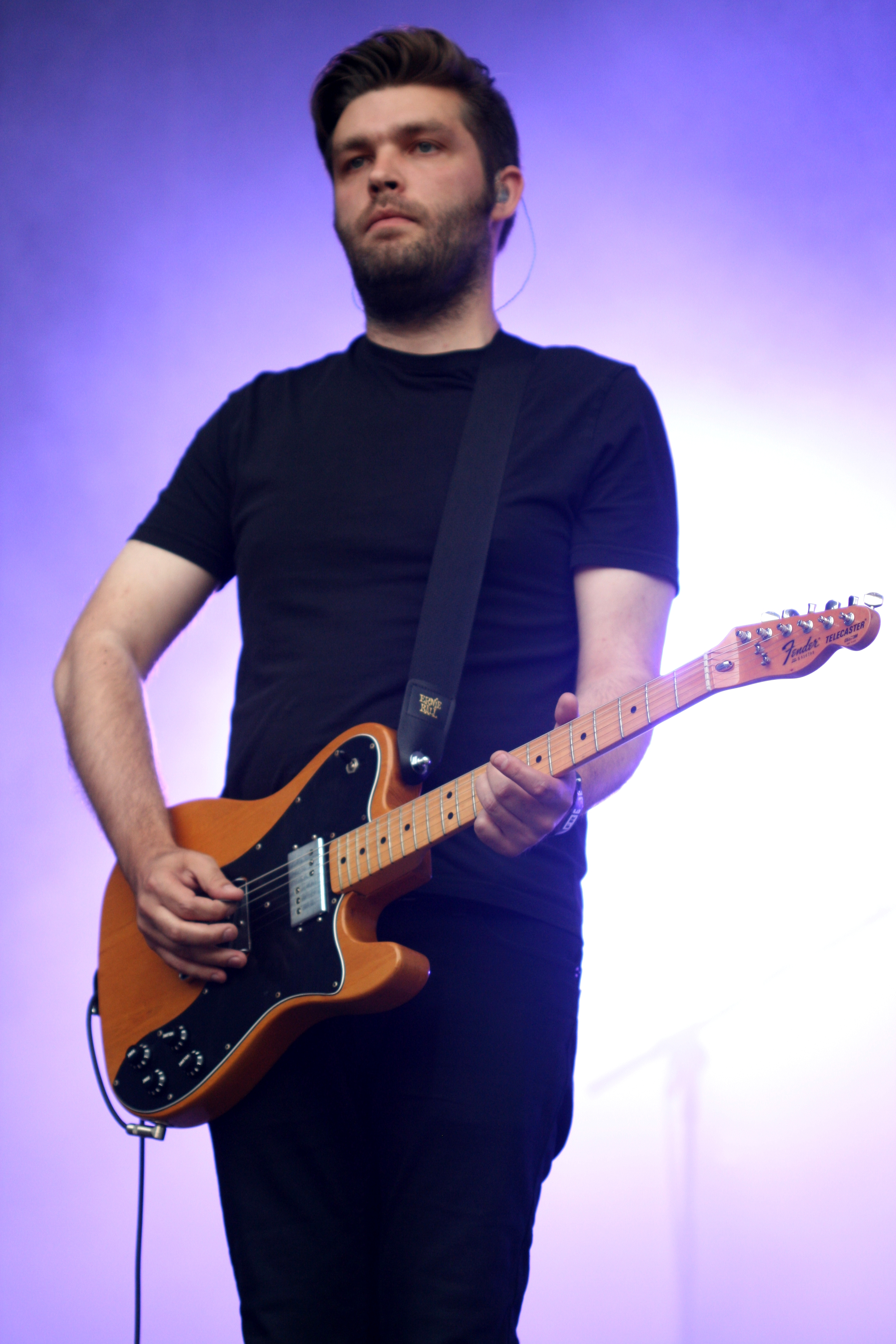
- Lockey in 2013

Background information
- Born: February 1980 (age 46); Doncaster, England

Justin Lockey (born February 1980) is a British musician, composer, record producer, recording engineer and record-label-owner from the north of England. He is best known as lead guitarist in multi-platinum-selling band Editors as well as Minor Victories alongside Stuart Braithwaite of Mogwai, Rachel Goswell of Slowdive and his brother James Lockey (with whom he also makes films under the Hand-Held Cine Club moniker).

== Early life ==
Lockey grew up in his South Yorkshire home town listening to record collections belonging to his older brothers and credits the American college rock and grunge of Pixies, Nirvana, Sonic Youth, Dinosaur Jr, The Breeders, The Smashing Pumpkins alongside British bands such as The Wedding Present, Teenage Fanclub, The La's with being part of his formative influences.

== Career ==
=== 1999–2007 Yourcodenameis:milo ===
Lockey was guitarist and producer in early post-hardcore band yourcodenameis:milo. The band met while he was working for Northumbria University's Students' Union.

The band were prominent in the Newcastle alternative music scene of the early 2000s alongside peers such as Maximo Park and The Futureheads and after playing just a handful of gigs DJ John Peel invited the band down to the BBC's Maida Vale studios in London to record the first of two Peel Sessions they would record.

The band signed a deal with Fiction/Polydor and started work on their first album All Roads to Fault with engineer Steve Albini (Nirvana, Pixies, Shellac) at his studio Electrical Audio in Chicago, US. The success of 'All Roads to Fault' led to the band picking up Best British Newcomer at the Kerrang awards 2004. After a cycle of touring the band then headed into the studio with producer Flood (U2, Depeche Mode, Smashing Pumpkins) to record their follow up - 2005’s ‘Ignoto’.

During the process of working with both Albini and Flood, Lockey refined his producing skills which he went on to use in the band's future records, Print is Dead and They Came From The Sun. Lockey remained in the studio for the live performances of ‘They Came from The Sun’ due to a shoulder injury he picked up. It was during this period that Lockey started producing for other bands more frequently as well as starting new projects and Yourcodenameis:milo went on an indefinite hiatus.

=== 2007–2012 The British Expeditionary Force / Erased Tapes Records ===
Lockey started the band The British Expeditionary Force with Aid Burrows of the northwestern band ‘My Architects' and his brother James.

The first album Chapter 1. A long Way From Home was released by the then fledgling Neo-Classical label, Erased Tapes Records and described by Lockey as "Prog-rock innit". The first album was recorded individually with band members being based at opposite end of the country. The band followed this up 5 years later in 2012, with Chapter 2: Konstellation Nue.

At the same time Lockey was a frequent producer on early releases on Erased Tapes Records, producing Codes In The Clouds debut record Paper Canyons as well production on "Fok" from Olafur Arnald’s first release for the Label Variations of Static.

=== 2009– White Belt Yellow Tag ===
Initially started as a project with fellow studio engineer Craig Pilbin, White Belt Yellow Tag signed to Distiller records and released one album Methods recorded in South Yorkshire in 2009. Drafting in Tom Bellamy of The Cooper Temple Clause on drums for the live set up the band toured The UK, Europe and US. Though short-lived, the duo released several EPs. over the following year before parting ways

=== 2012 onward– Editors ===
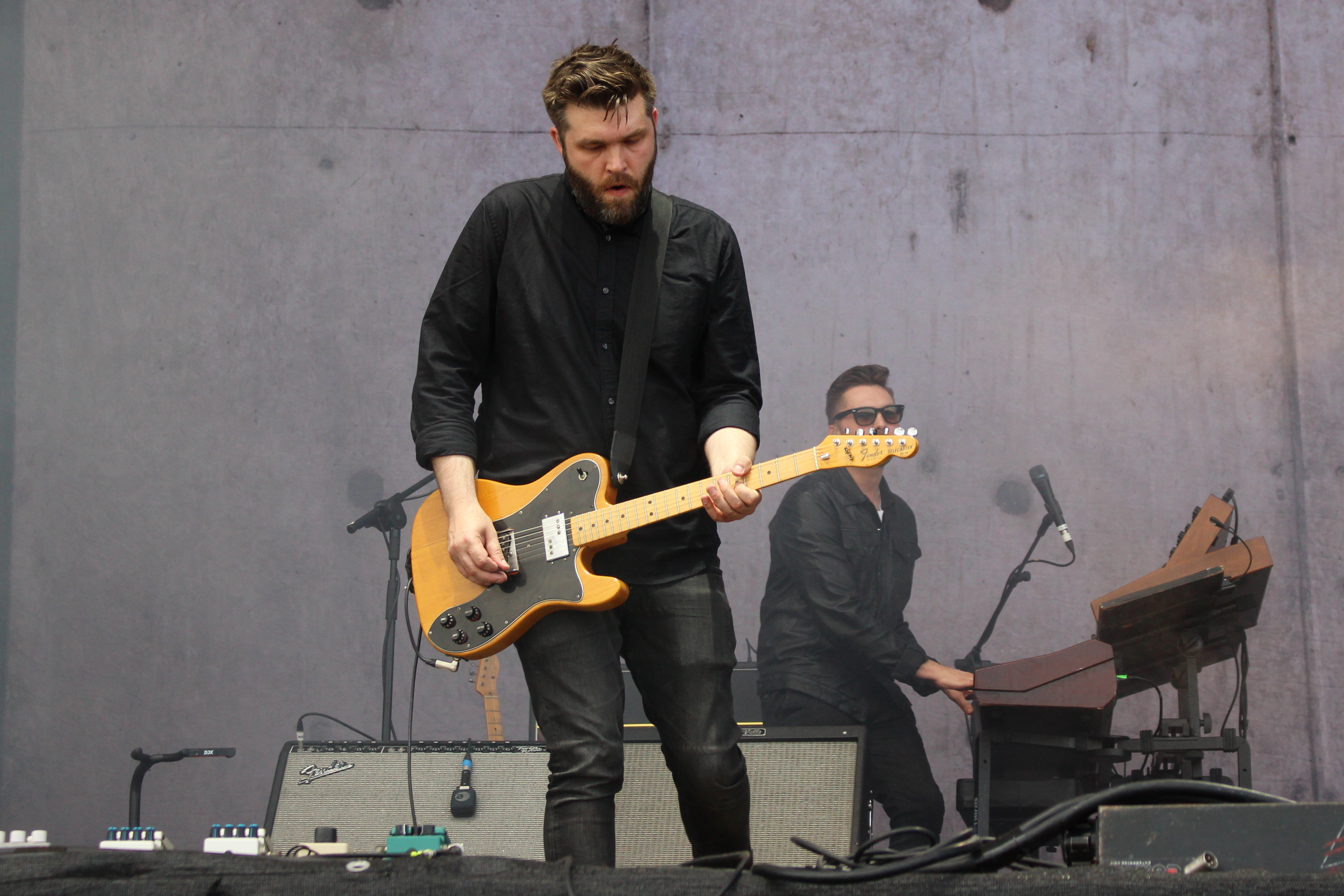
Lockey performing with Editors, 2016

After the departure of Chris Urbanowicz from the band, Lockey was drafted in, initially to play the lead guitar for a small run of gigs leading up to and including headlining Rock Werchter Festival in Belgium 2012.

Along with Elliott Williams, the band settled into a new period of creativity and after the Rock Werchter show the band in its new line-up wasted no time setting to work on the fourth studio album, 2014's The Weight of Your Love. Recorded by producer Jacquire King at the Blackbird Studios, Nashville, U.S.

Since that release the band have gone on to release two more albums. 2015's In Dream was engineered and co-produced by Lockey with the rest of the band in an isolated makeshift studio space on the west coast of Scotland.

2018's album Violence again saw the band set up a makeshift studio space, this time on the outskirts of Oxford, UK. This time Lockey engineered and producers Blanck Mass and Leo Abrahams were drafted in to finish the record. The remaining tracking being completed at Monnow Valley studios, Monmouth, Wales, UK.

2019 saw the release of Editors' first compilation album, Black Gold, featuring 13 tracks spanning the band's career to date. The band recorded three new songs for the compilation with producer Jacknife Lee (R.E.M, Snow Patrol) at his studio north of Los Angeles, U.S.

The deluxe edition of the release featured eight stripped-down acoustic versions of previously released material under the title Distance: The Acoustic Recordings, which Lockey engineered, produced and, with cellist Brione Jackson, composed cello arrangements for.

=== Minor Victories ===
Minor Victories is a group made up of Justin Lockey, his brother James Lockey, Stuart Braithwaite (Mogwai) and Rachel Goswell (Slowdive).

The band formed after Rachel provided vocals on Editors In Dream album and met with Lockey. Mogwai's Stuart Braithwaite and Justin's older brother and film-making partner James completed the line up and the group created the self titled album remotely. The album was accompanied by a series of short films created by the Lockey brothers under their handheldcineclub moniker. The album was produced and engineered by Lockey, with additional production by Tony Doogan and mixed by Paul Gregory in Newcastle, UK

=== Lights On Moscow ===
Lights on Moscow is a two-person project consisting of Lockey and Hazel Wilde from the band Lanterns On The Lake. The pair collaborated on and off for over a decade without releasing a song until their first e.p ‘Aorta Songs pt.1’ was released by Lockey’s label Physical Education Recordings in 2018.

=== Mastersystem ===
Formed after a friendship and working relationship between two set of brothers Justin and James Lockey and Scott and Grant Hutchison of Frightened Rabbit, Mastersystem was a college rock/grunge band which ditched the graces and timelines of their respective bands to make an album that they would have liked to have listened to when they were teenagers. The album 'Dance Music' was released on Lockey’s label Physical Education recordings and was the last album by Scott Hutchison.

=== Physical Education Recordings ===
Mastersystem's album was the first debut release on the Lockey's own record label, Physical Education Recordings, followed by 'Aorta Songs' from Lights On Moscow. Alongside his own bands, Lockey has also worked with several other bands to release 'Cagework’ By Cagework and the debut album ‘Forever Whatever’ by British alt rock band October Drift. Lockey utilises his recording studio Yorkshire as the heart of the label with most of the releases being produced there.

=== Other pursuits ===
Lockey is also a writer and director. and has developed original drama with production companies internationally. Lockey formed the film-making duo handheldcineclub with his brother and Minor Victories band mate James Lockey. Since starting handheldcineclub the brothers have wrote, directed and produced and edited music videos and short films for Mogwai, Frightened Rabbit, The Staves, The Twilight Sad, Maps & Atlases, Editors, Band of Skulls among others. Handheld Cineclub were also behind Tiny Changes, a documentary about the making of the covers album of the same name in memory of Scott Hutchison.

Throughout his musical career, Lockey has also been involved in composing music.

== Discography ==
Band	Recording	Year	Credit
Yourcodenameis:milo	All Roads to Fault	2004	Performer
Yourcodenameis:milo	Ignoto	2005	Performer, writing and arrangement
I Love Poland	I Love Poland (EP)	2006	Producer
Yourcodenameis:milo	Print is Dead	2006	Performer, writing and arrangement and producer
Yourcodenameis:milo	They Came from the Sun	2007	Performer, writing and arrangement and producer
The British Expeditionary Force	Chapter One: A Long Way From Home	2007	Engineer, Mixing, Performer, Writer, Composer
Codes in the Clouds	Paper Canyon	2009	Producer, Engineer, Mixing, Writer
Cracks in the Cloud	Various - NARC. Compilation	2010	Composer
White Belt Yellow Tag	Methods	2009	Performer
Codes in the Clouds	Paper Canyon Recycled	2010	Composer
The British Expeditionary Force	Chapter Two: Konstellation Nue	2012	Producer, Engineer, Group Member
Editors	The Weight of Your Love	2013	Composer, Mixing, Producer
Editors	In Dream	2015	Engineer, Composer
Minor Victories	Minor Victories	2016	Producer, Group Member, Composer
Minor Victories	Minor Victories- Orchestral Variations	2017	Composer
Mastersystem	Dance Music	2018	Producer, Performer
Editors	Violence	2018	Performer, composer, engineer
Lights On Moscow	Aorta Songs	2018	Performer, writer, producer
Editors	Black Gold	2019	Performer
Editors	The Blanck Mass Sessions	2019	Engineer, Composer

== Filmography (as handheldcineclub) ==
Band	Video
Frightened Rabbit	The Loneliness and the Scream (2010) The Woodpile (2012) Here- The Highlands Tour Documentary (2012) Holy (2013) State Hospital (2013) Backyard Skulls (2013) There- US Tour Documentary (2013) Tiny Changes Documentary (2019)
We Were Promised Jetpacks	Medicine (2011)
Band of Skulls	Devil Takes Care of His Own (2011)
The Boxer Rebellion	Diamonds (2013)
The Staves	Tongue Behind My Teeth (2013)
Editors	Nashville Films 1-5 (2013) Live Visuals The Weight of Your Love Documentary (2013)
Owl John	Los Angeles Be Kind (2014)
Y.O.U	Heavy Crown (2014)
Luke Sital Singh	Greatest Lovers (2014)
Broken Records	Toska (2014)
The Twilight Sad	It Was Never The Same (2015)
Lanterns on the Lake	Faultlines (2015)
Minor Victories	Film 1 (2015) Film 2 (2016) A Hundred Ropes (2016) Cogs (2016) Breaking My Light (2016) Folk Arp (2016) Scattered Ashes (Song for Richard) (2016)
Mogwai	Coolverine (2017)
Nadine Shah	Out of the Way (2017)
Vessels	Radiart (2017)
Mastersystem	Notes on a Life Not Quite Lived (2018) The Enlightenment (2018) Old Team (2018)
