= Paul Mullen (musician) =

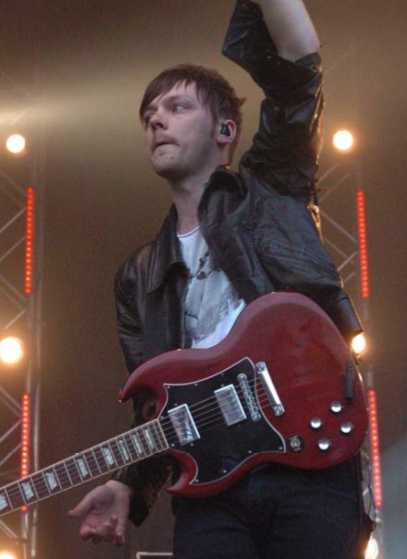
- Mullen performing in 2009

Background information
- Born: 6 September 1982 (age 43)
- Origin: Houghton-le-Spring, England
- Genres: Math rock, electro, pop punk, alternative rock, post-hardcore
- Occupation: Musician
- Instruments: Guitar, vocals, keyboards

Paul Mullen (born 6 September 1982) is an English musician, multi-instrumentalist, and singer-songwriter who first gained recognition for being vocalist and guitarist of the band Yourcodenameis:milo, who went on hiatus in 2007. Since their hiatus, Mullen has gone on to both join and form a number of bands, which he currently splits his time between – including The Automatic, Young Legionnaire, Losers, and Bleach Blood.

Mullen was born in Houghton-le-Spring, Tyne and Wear. Paul attended St Robert of Newminster Catholic School from 1995 - 2001. He would go on to form YCNI:M in nearby Washington before relocating to Cardiff in 2007 when he joined The Automatic. Mullen has since moved between London, Sunderland and Berlin, Germany.

== Musical career ==
=== Beginnings and Muddy Bee ===
Paul was singer and guitarist in the three-piece Souler Rico, whose music was compared to Muse, although they also possessed a funk-rock element. Songs of theirs included 'China', 'Reunion' and 'Mirror's View.' They supported hardcore band Mclusky and later changed their name to Muddy Bee (songs included 'K-9' and 'Department of Eric', with this iteration of the band being more in the style of Gang Of Four); both outfits were unsigned.

=== Yourcodenameis:milo (2002–2007) ===
Yourcodenameis:milo formed in 2002 Washington, Tyne and Wear with Mullen providing vocals, guitar and synthesizers, during the band's run. They released two albums, Ignoto and They Came from the Sun, as well as their breakthrough mini-album All Roads to Fault and collaboration album Print Is Dead Vol 1 which featured artists such as Gordon Moakes of Bloc Party, Tom Vek, Lethal Bizzle, Get Cape. Wear Cape. Fly and The Automatic.

On 21 August 2007, YCNI:M announced that they would go on indefinite hiatus, stating "We are all exceptionally proud of all we have achieved as a band, but feel it is time to move on and explore new paths both musical and non- musical"

Mullen, along with Yourcodenameis:milo bandmate Ross Harley performed the track "17" from the band's album Ignoto in February 2011. In 2012 whilst being interviewed about a forthcoming Young Legionnaire release, Wreckonomics Mullen stated that Milo were likely to return in the future "I have mentioned in the past that Milo isn't dead. Just resting. He's got some unfinished business. When will he wake? I don't know. Once in a while Milo meets with his old friends in The Cluny and has a big fuck off burger. Maybe when the burgers run out.".

Yourcodenameis:milo reunited to play two gigs at the Cluny on 7 and 8 April 2023 and opened a mailing list, advertised on twitter on 8 April for news about the band. They also played Arctangent festival on 17 August 2023.

=== The Automatic (2007–2010) ===
At the time of Yourcodenameis:milo entering hiatus, Welsh band The Automatic had also split with their keyboard player, Alex Pennie. Having previously written and performed together on the track "Trapeze Artist" from the Yourcodenameis:milo collaboration record Print is Dead, a mutual friend suggested to both Mullen and The Automatic that he might join. After travelling to Cardiff and writing the track "This Ship" during their first rehearsal, it was officially announced in October 2007 that Mullen had joined, not as a direct replacement for Pennie but instead as a vocalist, guitarist and keys/synthesizer player.

Mullen suggested that musically, the pairing worked so well as Yourcodenameis:milo were heading in a more melodic, pop direction with their last album They Came from The Sun, whilst The Automatic were writing heavier, more guitar driven material, thus the two "met in the middle" when it came to writing material. The first The Automatic release to feature Mullen, This Is A Fix was recorded in Los Angeles with producer Butch Walker and would see Mullen split lead vocal responsibilities with the band's original singer, Rob Hawkins, guitars, keyboards, synthesizers and backing-vocals were also split between Mullen, Hawkins and James Frost.

After extensive touring across Europe in 2008 and into 2009, the band would return to Cardiff to begin working with producer Richard Jackson on their third album. The record would again expand upon Mullen's vocal responsibilities – having originally joined the band after they'd already completed writing much of the material on This Is A Fix, this time Mullen would be involved from the beginning. After demoing around 20 tracks they narrowed it down to just 11, releasing Tear the Signs Down in March 2010. After releasing and touring the record, the band entered an "unofficial hiatus" whilst vocalist/bassist Rob Hawkins and drummer Iwan Griffiths attend university, and both Mullen and James Frost pursue other projects.

=== Young Legionnaire (2009–present) ===
In 2009 whilst Mullen was recording Tear the Signs Down with The Automatic, he also began working with Bloc Party bassist Gordon Moakes and Brontide/La Roux drummer William Bowerman. Mullen had previously worked with Moakes on the Yourcodenameis:milo Print is Dead sessions, similarly to The Automatic – and the pair had long wanted to work together again, however with both The Automatic and Bloc Party having busy schedules they had been previously unable to find the time.

The great thing with Paul is you get a great vocalist and a great guitarist in one person, so that's half a band right there

— Bloc Party & Young Legionnaire bassist Gordon Moakes on wanting to work with Mullen

In December 2009, drummer William Bowerman tweeted that the band would be in the studio for three days. The band then made their live debut on 28 January 2010, it wasn't until August 2010 that the band released their first single "Colossus"/"Iron Dream" on Holy Roar Records. With members of The Automatic making the decision to work towards obtaining degrees and Bloc Party still on hiatus, Young Legionnaire became a full-time project. As Bowerman was busy touring with La Roux, Mullen and Moakes recruited drummer Dean Pearson, the three then began working on their debut record. Longtime producer of The Automatic, Richard Jackson was recruited for the sessions which took place in Monnow Valley, Monmouth and Sub Bubble, Wembley, eventually leading to the release of Crisis Works in May 2011.

After extensive touring the band then worked with four different producers in four different studios on new material which would eventually take the form of a new EP titled Wreckonomics, which saw release in March 2012 before Moakes returned to Bloc Party, leaving Young Legionnaire inactive.

In early 2014 the band began working on new material and performed a single date at The Garage in Islington, London, where they debuted two new tracks, titled on the setlist as "New 6/8" and "New Arpeg".

The band released their second album 'Zero Worship' in 2016. The same year they played a short run of gigs in support of the album, including the Parish, Huddersfield.

=== Losers (2011–present) ===
In 2011, Mullen joined electronic-act Losers, who until his joining had predominately been an instrumental, electro based duo. Composed of former The Cooper Temple Clause guitarist Tom Bellamy and DJ Eddy Temple-Morris, Mullen joined as vocalist and multi-instrumentalist as the band progressed into a heavier, more guitar driven sound. Mullen's first record with the band ...And So We Shall Never Part was released through a fan funding project on PledgeMusic in 2013. In 2013 Young Legionnaire drummer Dean Pearson also joined the band as live drummer.

=== Bleach Blood (2012–2014) ===
In 2012 Mullen began working with former guitarist & vocalist of The King Blues, Jamie Jazz after the pair "kept bumping into each other" in London. Bleach Blood featured Jazz on lead vocals, with Mullen on guitar and backing vocals and in December 2012 the band released their debut EP – The Young Heartbreakers Club. After a string of releases including singles "H.O.P.E.", "Anything, Anything" & "Pleased to Meet You" as well as further EP "Darling Don't Dive" the band announced their album All the Sides of a Circle would be released in 2015. Currently living in Berlin, Mullen whilst featuring on all of the band's recordings, is only an occasional live member.

=== Other projects ===
In 2008 Mullen worked with instrumental band Codes in the Clouds remixing their track "Don't Awash in This Digital Landscape". Mullen provided vocals whilst his Yourcodenameis:milo bandmate Justin Lockey produced the remix. On the Tear the Signs Down album tour with The Automatic, Mullen appeared onstage with support band Straight Lines to cover "One Armed Scissor" by At The Drive-In. Mullen is an artist partner of Flo-culture and has also worked with The Young Creative Council. As part of his work with The Young Creative Council in July 2012 Mullen performed an improvised acoustic set and modelled for a live drawing session.

== Discography ==
With Muddy Bee

- The Basic Monster – 2002

With Yourcodenameis:milo

- All Roads to Fault – 12 May 2004
- Ignoto – 18 April 2005
- Print Is Dead Vol 1 – 6 November 2006
- They Came From The Sun – 2 April 2007

With The Automatic

- This Is A Fix – 25 August 2008
- Tear the Signs Down – 8 March 2010

With Young Legionnaire

- Colossus/Iron Dream (Single) – 16 August 2010
- Crisis Works – 9 May 2011
- Wreckonomics – March 2012
- Zero Worship – June 2016

With Bleach Blood

- The Young Heartbreakers Club EP – 2012
- Darling Don't Dive EP – 2013
- All the Sides of a Circle – 2015

With Losers

- ...And So We Shall Never Part – 2013
- How To Ruin Other People's Futures – September 2016

Guest appearance

- Codes in the Clouds – "Don't Go Awash in This Digital Landscape" – January 2009

== Equipment ==
- Gibson SG (one in red and one white)
- Gibson Les Paul
- Gibson ES-335
- Orange OR120
- Marshall Bluesbreaker
- Fender Jaguar
- Fender Stratocaster
- Fender Telecaster
- Korg MicroKorg
