= Losers (band) =

- Origin: London, England
- Genres: Alternative rock, electronic
- Years active: 2007–present
- Label: Nineteen95 Artist Management
- Members: Eddy Temple-Morris; Tom Bellamy; Paul Mullen
- Website: www.losersband.com

Losers are a British band consisting of DJ Eddy Temple-Morris, multi-instrumentalist Tom Bellamy (formerly of The Cooper Temple Clause), guitarist Paul Mullen (formerly of Yourcodenameis:milo and The Automatic). During their live performances they get supported by Dean "Denzel" Pearson (drums) and Sammi Doll (also keyboardist of Berlin/LA based band IAMX) and Bullet Height). Their former drummer was Mark Heron (formerly of Oceansize).

== History ==
Losers formed in 2007 as the remix project of Temple-Morris and Bellamy. They released their first album, "Beautiful Losers", in September 2010. The first single "Flush", featuring rappers Riz MC and Envy, received coverage from the music press and the BBC.

Guitarist Paul Mullen joined the band in October 2010, marking the start of a move away from dance-oriented music and towards more guitar-focused rock music. By summer 2011 drummer Mark Heron had also joined the band, and they began working on their second album "...And So We Shall Never Part". The album was released on 4 April 2014. The single "Turn Around" was used as the backing music for the trailer for the fourth season of US television series Game of Thrones, while their single "Azan" was used on the intro for Mnet's dance competition, Street Women Fighter, Soundtrack for Royal Blood episode of Reign, trailer for the film Hercules and the video game Far Cry 3. Lately they have been touring Europe as guests of Sisters Of Mercy.

Their song "Us vs Night" was played during the first season of The Shannara Chronicles.

== Discography ==
- Beautiful Losers (2010)
- ...And So We Shall Never Part (2014)
- ...And So We Shall Never Part Two (remixes) (2014)
- How To Ruin Other People's Futures (2016)
- EP01 (2021)
