= Waves Are Universal =

Studio album by Rachel Goswell
- Released: June 14, 2004
- Recorded: 2004
- Genre: Folk rock, singer-songwriter, dream pop
- Length: 44:19
- Label: 4AD (CAD 2414)
- Producer: David Naughton

Rachel Goswell chronology
The Sleep Shelter EP (2004)	Waves Are Universal (2004)

Professional ratings
Review scores
Source	Rating
Allmusic	3/5 stars
NME	4/5 stars
Pitchfork Media	6.8/10
Rolling Stone	Positive
Stylus Magazine	C
Tiny Mix Tapes	3/5 stars

Waves Are Universal is the debut solo album from former Slowdive and Mojave 3 singer/guitarist Rachel Goswell. It was produced by David Naughton, and released by 4AD on June 14, 2004, in the UK and June 22, 2004, in the US. The album was recorded after production and touring for Mojave 3's album Spoon and Rafter resumed. The songs "Plucked" and "Sleepless & Tooting" appeared on Rachel's EP The Sleep Shelter, released prior to the album in May 2004, and both "Coastline" and "Plucked" were remixed and featured on a special single released in February 2005. Waves Are Universal was released to generally positive reviews, receiving an overall 66% positive rating on Metacritic. In December 2004, American webzine Somewhere Cold ranked Waves Are Universal No. 7 on their 2004 Somewhere Cold Awards Hall of Fame list.

== Track listing ==
1. "Warm Summer Sun" (Goswell) – 3:45
2. "Gather Me Up" (Goswell) – 2:24
3. "No Substitute" (Goswell) – 4:36
4. "Deelay" (Goswell, Light) – 4:13
5. "Plucked" (Goswell, Light) – 3:08
6. "Hope" (Goswell, Light) – 3:52
7. "Coastline" (Goswell) – 5:43
8. "Shoulder the Blame" (Goswell, Light) – 3:06
9. "Save Yourself" (Goswell) – 3:59
10. "Thru the Dawn" (Goswell) – 3:09
11. "Beautiful Feeling" (Goswell) – 3:27
12. "Sleepless & Tooting" (Goswell, Light) – 3:01

== Credits ==
- Produced, engineered, and mixed by David Naughton.
1. "Warm Summer Sun"
  - Rachel Goswell – vocals, accordion, squeeze box
  - Joe Light – acoustic guitar, 12-string guitar
  - David Naughton – dumb bass, fuzz bass, 12-string guitar, shaker
  - Bill Drake – piano
  - Jerome Farrell – uilleann pipes
  - Ashley Bates – drums
  - Ambiences: Lostwithiel church bells and Chislehurst Caves
2. "Gather Me Up"
  - Rachel Goswell – vocals, acoustic guitar
  - Bill Drake – harmonium
  - Jerome Farrell – low D whistle
  - Ashley Bates – ding
  - Mother Nature: Lostwithiel birds and ambience
3. "No Substitute"
  - Rachel Goswell – vocals, claps
  - Joe Light – acoustic guitar, 12-string guitar, electric guitar
  - David Naughton – bass, shaker, tambourine, claps
  - Ashley Bates – drums
  - Bill Drake – piano
  - Ambience: St Merryn airfield
4. "Deelay"
  - Rachel Goswell – vocals
  - Joe Light – acoustic guitar, swell guitar, rhythm guitar, ebo guitar
  - David Naughton – bass, accordion, shaker, tambourine, guitar knock, heartbeat
5. "Plucked"
  - Rachel Goswell – vocals
  - Joe Light – acoustic guitars
  - David Naughton – caved Wurlitzer, string arrangement
  - Jeremy Perl – cello
  - Bronwyn Stride – violin
  - Ambiences: Chislehurst Caves and Thai insects
6. "Hope"
  - Rachel Goswell – vocals
  - Joe Light – acoustic guitars
  - David Naughton – bass, percussion
  - Bill Drake – harmonium
  - Lynne Jackaman – bangles
  - Ambiences: Camden Road and Chislehurst Caves
7. "Coastline"
  - Rachel Goswell – vocals, rhythm guitar, lead guitar
  - Joe Light – slide guitar, guitar effects
  - David Naughton – bass, 12-string guitar, bongos
  - Ashley Bates – drums, tambourine, lion's roar
8. "Shoulder the Blame"
  - Rachel Goswell – vocals
  - Joe Light – bass, acoustic guitar, arch top slide guitar, lead guitar
  - David Naughton – pot, letterbox bells
  - Mother Nature: Thai waves
9. "Save Yourself"
  - Rachel Goswell – vocals, acoustic strum guitar
  - Joe Light – acoustic guitar, electric guitar
  - David Naughton – harmonium
  - Bill Drake – piano
  - Ashley Bates – drums
10. "Thru the Dawn"
  - Rachel Goswell – vocals, acoustic guitar
  - David Naughton – shaker, vibraphone
  - Melanie Shallenberg – flute
  - Mother Nature: rain
11. "Beautiful Feeling"
  - Rachel Goswell – vocals, acoustic guitar, accordion
  - Jeremy Perl – cello
  - Richard Lane – violin
  - Michael Perl – violin
  - Reiad Chiba – viola
12. "Sleepless & Tooting"
  - Rachel Goswell – vocals, snare drum
  - Joe Light – bass, main guitar, acoustic guitar, electric guitar, bongos, shaker, low hit
  - David Naughton – mini Spanish guitar, rain stick, ethnic tambourine, ride cymbal
  - Bill Drake – Hammond organ
- Recorded at:
  - The Troll Boudoir, Camden
  - The Sleep Shelter, Tooting
  - Tower of Power, London
  - The Shed & The Cottage, Lostwithiel
  - Mayfair 6, London
  - M3 HQ, St Merryn
  - Beech Studios, London
- Ambient field recordings recorded at:
  - Chislehurst Caves, Kent
  - Lostwithiel
  - St Merryn airfield
  - Camden Road, London
  - Chiang Mai and Cha-am, Thailand
- Copyist: Stephen Lipson.
- Mastered by Tony Cousins at Metropolis Mastering.
- Front cover oil painting by T. Jackiewiecz.
- Layout by Alison Fielding.
- Typography by Rachel Goswell.
- Inner sleeve main photograph by Alan Forrester.
- Snapshots by Ashley Bates, David Naughton, and Rachel Goswell.
