= Young Legionnaire =

British indie rock band

- Mullen (left), Moakes (right)

Background information
- Origin: United Kingdom
- Genres: Indie rock, alternative rock, post-hardcore
- Years active: 2009–present
- Labels: Holy Roar, Wichita, Superstar Destroyer Records
- Members: Paul Mullen; Gordon Moakes; Dean Pearson
- Past members: Will Bowerman
- Website: younglegionnaire.com

Young Legionnaire are a British band formed in 2009. Since 2010, the band's lineup has consisted of founders Paul Mullen (of The Automatic, formerly of yourcodenameis:milo) and Gordon Moakes (formerly of Bloc Party) alongside drummer Dean Pearson. Will Bowerman was the band's drummer from their formation until his departure in 2010, returning to touring duties with La Roux.

The band released their first single, the limited vinyl release of "Colossus/Iron Dream" through Holy Roar Records, in 2010, with their debut album Crisis Works released through Wichita Recordings the following year to favourable reviews. An extended play entitled Wreckonomics was released in 2012. Their second full-length album Zero Worship was released through Superstar Destroyer Records in 2016.

== History ==
=== Crisis Works & Wreckonomics (2009–2012) ===
In 2006, Mullen's band at the time, yourcodenameis:milo started a collaborations project called Print Is Dead, the idea being bands would go up to the yourcodenameis:milo studio in Newcastle and spend no longer than one day writing and recording a song for a record. Moakes was among the musicians who took part in the project, recording a track with the band called "Wait A Minute". This started the idea of working together again, although commitments with their other bands had meant that they did not have time to. When yourcodenameis:milo went on hiatus in 2007, Mullen joined The Automatic as a guitarist and vocalist, with Moakes continuing with Bloc Party.

With Bloc Party on hiatus and The Automatic taking some time off in December 2009, Moakes and Mullen convened with drummer William Bowerman. In January 2010, the group were revealed to be named "Young Legionnaire" and they played their first show at the end of January in London. The band then made their live debut on 28 January 2010, it wasn't until August 2010 that the band released their first single "Colossus"/"Iron Dream" on Holy Roar Records. On 16 August 2010, the band released their first single, the double A Side "Colossus/Iron Dream" on both limited edition vinyl and digitally on Holy Roar Records. With members of The Automatic making the decision to work towards obtaining degrees and Bloc Party still on hiatus, Young Legionnaire became a full-time project. As Bowerman was busy touring with La Roux, Mullen and Moakes recruited drummer Dean Pearson, the three then began working on their debut record. Longtime producer of The Automatic, Richard Jackson was recruited for the sessions which took place in Monnow Valley, Monmouth and Sub Bubble, Wembley, eventually leading to the release of Crisis Works in May 2011.

It was revealed in early 2011 that the band would be releasing their debut album Crisis Works on 9 May 2011 through Wichita, produced by longtime producer of Mullen's other band, The Automatic, Richard Jackson. Album track "Chapter, Verse" was made available on the band's website as a free download after being premiered on Zane Lowe BBC Radio 1 show. After extensive touring the band then worked with four different producers in four different studios on new material which would eventually take the form of a new EP titled Wreckonomics, which saw release in March 2012 before Moakes returned to Bloc Party, leaving Young Legionnaire inactive.

=== Second album, Zero Worship (2014–present) ===
In early 2014 the band began working on new material and performed a single date at The Garage in Islington, London, where they debuted two new tracks, titled on the setlist as "New 6/8" and "New Arpeg". In February 2015 the band toured as support to Idlewild while continuing to work on new material. In March 2015 Moakes announced he had left Bloc Party to concentrate on Young Legionnaire. In April 2016 the band announced that their second album would be called Zero Worship and pre-released to record backers on 24 June 2016 ahead of a full release on 25 November on LP and CD.

== Members ==
Current

- Paul Mullen – vocals, guitars (2009–present)
- Gordon Moakes – bass, vocals (2009–present)
- Dean Pearson – drums, percussion (2010–present)

Former

- William Bowerman – drums, percussion (2009–2010)

== Discography ==
Studio albums

- Crisis Works (9 May 2011)
- Zero Worship (24 June 2016 (digital) / 25 November 2016 (physical))

Extended plays

- Wreckonomics (12 March 2012)

Singles

- "Colossus/Iron Dream" (16 August 2010)
- "Chapter, Verse" (8 March 2011)
- "Numbers" (2 May 2011)
- "Disappear" (16 September 2016)
- "Heart Attack" (21 October 2016)
- "Candidate" (21 November 2016)

Music Videos

- "Colossus" (2010)
- "Numbers" (2011)
- "Disappear" (2016)
- "Heart Attack" (2016)
- "Candidate" (2016)
