= Rachel Goswell =

British musician

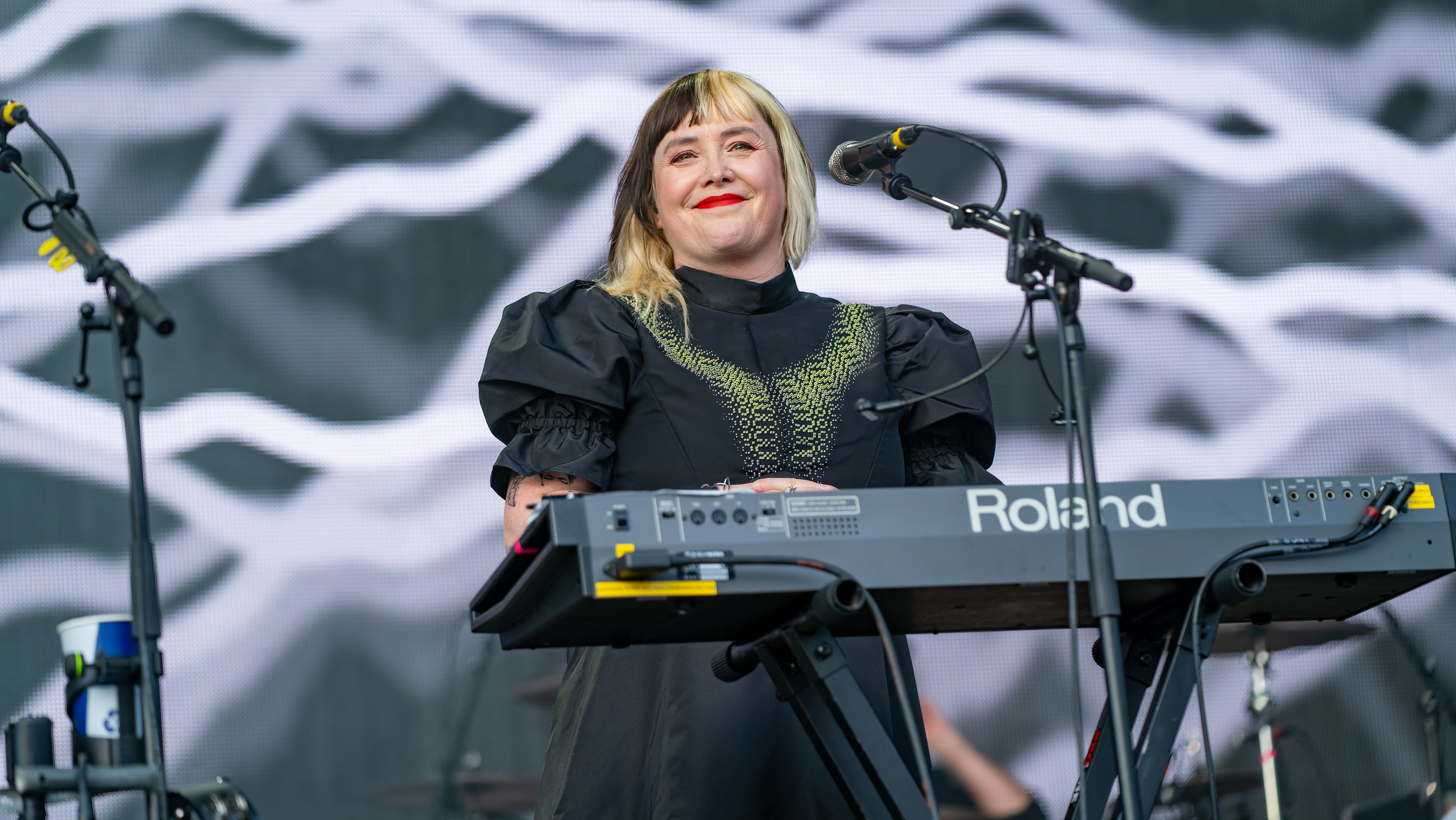
- Goswell performing in 2024

Background information
- Born: Rachel Ann Goswell; 16 May 1971 (age 55); Fareham, Hampshire, England
- Genres: Indie pop; dream pop; folk rock; experimental rock; shoegazing
- Occupations: Musician; singer; songwriter
- Instruments: Vocals; guitar; keyboards; bass
- Years active: 1988–present
- Labels: 4AD; Creation Records; Capitol
- Member of: Slowdive, Minor Victories
- Formerly of: Mojave 3
- Spouses: Christopher Andrews (m. 1994; div. 2000) Steve Clarke (m. 2018)

Rachel Ann Goswell (born 16 May 1971) is an English musician who rose to prominence as vocalist and guitarist of the shoegaze band Slowdive, which formed in 1989. When Slowdive disbanded in 1995, Goswell, along with Neil Halstead, Ian McCutcheon and former Chapterhouse member Simon Rowe became Mojave 3, performing in a more country/folk rock style. She released a solo album in 2004, titled Waves Are Universal on 4AD Records.

== Early life ==
Goswell was born in Fareham, Hampshire, England. Her family moved to Wales after her birth, and to Reading, Berkshire when she was seven, where she spent the rest of her youth. She has an older brother.

Her father taught her folk guitar songs from the age of seven, and she began studying classical guitar and music theory at age ten. Goswell took classical guitar lessons along with childhood friend Neil Halstead, with whom she formed Slowdive in 1989. She was influenced, from a singing point of view, by Siouxsie Sioux", "it was [she] who made me want to be a singer." Joni Mitchell, Iggy Pop and Nick Cave were her other favourite singers. Goswell was also inspired by the Cocteau Twins; she discovered their music at 16 and "found myself immersed in the magic and wonder of their overall sound musically." The songs that influenced her the most were: "There Is A Light That Never Goes Out" by The Smiths, "92 Degrees" from Siouxsie and the Banshees' Tinderbox album, "Persephone" from Cocteau Twins' Treasure album and "River" by Joni Mitchell.

== Career ==
Goswell formed the indie rock band the Pumpkin Fairies with Neil Halstead, Adrian Sell and Nick Chaplin in 1988, after having played in several cover bands in Reading. When the Pumpkin Fairies dissolved in 1989, the group then formed Slowdive in the same year. She was a member of Slowdive until the band's dissolution in 1995. After the disbandment, Goswell and Halstead formed Mojave 3, an offshoot of Slowdive; the group captured a more folk rock-oriented sound as opposed to Slowdive's shoegaze sound. They released five albums, their last being Puzzles Like You in 2006, before going on a hiatus.

The year 2004 saw Goswell release solo recordings with co-writer Joe Light and producer David Naughton. Nine months after Mojave 3 released Spoon and Rafter, she released The Sleep Shelter EP. Waves Are Universal, her first full-length recording, appeared a month later. Tiny Mix Tapes described the record as "delicate and well-thought out" despite occasionally veering towards "the frankly repulsive world of adult contemporary" while Pitchfork Media thought the album was "warm [and] summery ... agreeable, if not very exciting". Stylus Magazine stated that Waves Are Universal is "a solid album that could appeal to both fans of [Goswell's] previous work and others". In February 2005, a limited edition remix 12" (also available as a download) entitled Coastline/Plucked was issued and features two mixes apiece from the Earlies and Ulrich Schnauss.

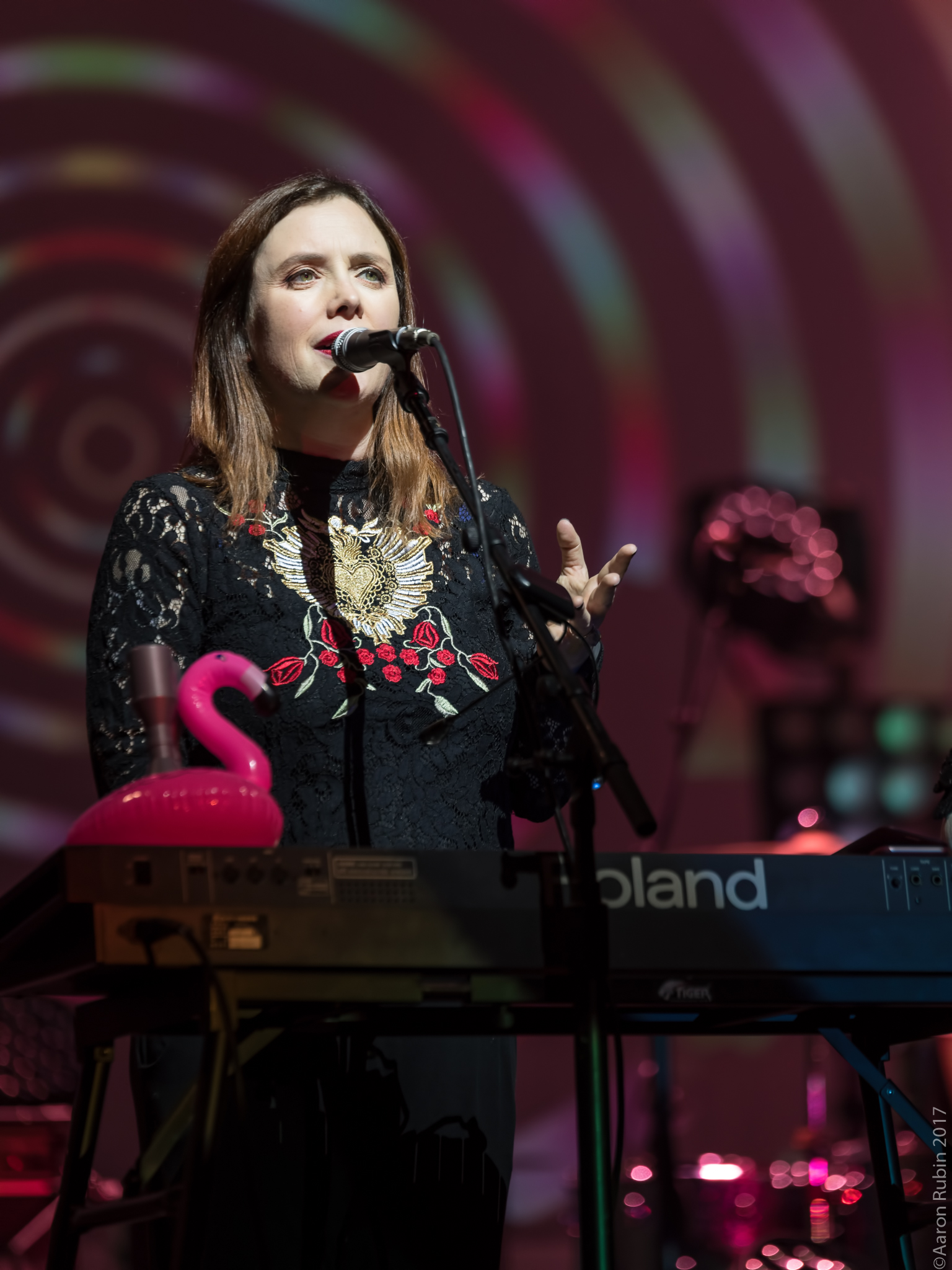
Rachel Goswell performing with Slowdive at Way Back When Festival 2017 in Dortmund

In 2014, Slowdive, with Goswell, performed for gigs and have declared in interviews that they would be working on new material. The band continue to tour. In 2016 Goswell joined Stuart Braithwaite, Justin Lockey and James Lockey to form the band Minor Victories. Their self-titled debut was released in June 2016 on Fat Possum Records.

In April 2019, Goswell and her husband Steve Clarke announced a new musical project called the Soft Cavalry. On 5 July 2019, the duo released their self titled LP, which since then has been acclaimed by critics.

In July 2025, Goswell's vocals were featured on "Thin Horses", the final track of the Big Special album National Average.

== Personal life ==
Goswell was in a relationship with fellow Slowdive vocalist and guitarist Neil Halstead from 1989 to 1993, breaking up shortly before the release of Souvlaki.

Goswell was married to Air Cuba's Christopher Andrews from 1994 until 2000.

In 2018, Goswell married Steve Clarke.

Goswell is profoundly deaf in one ear as a result of labyrinthitis which occurred in 2006. This also left her with chronic tinnitus. As a result, Goswell had to stop playing and touring with Mojave 3.

In 2010 Goswell gave birth to a son who has CHARGE syndrome; he is profoundly deaf and has a serious heart condition which resulted in open heart surgery at the age of five months. She is vocal about rights for parents of deaf children to have free access to learning sign language in the UK.

== Equipment ==
Rachel Goswell's 1993 Slowdive guitar rig consisted of a Fender '72 Telecaster Thinline, a Boss OD-2 Turbo Overdrive, a Yamaha FX-500 Multi-FX unit and a Roland JC-77 Jazz Chorus 2x10 combo amp. Since Slowdive's reunion in 2014, Rachel Goswell's main guitar on tour is a Custom77 The Roxy – Hollowbody. She also frequently uses a Roland Juno 106 synthesizer.

== Discography ==
Slowdive

- Just for a Day (1991)
- Souvlaki (1993)
- Pygmalion (1995)
- Slowdive (2017)
- Everything Is Alive (2023)

Mojave 3

- Ask Me Tomorrow (1995)
- Out of Tune (1998)
- Excuses for Travellers (2000)
- Spoon and Rafter (2003)
- Puzzles Like You (2006)

Minor Victories

- Minor Victories (2016)

The Soft Cavalry

- The Soft Cavalry (2019)

Rachel Goswell

- The Sleep Shelter EP (17 May 2004) 4AD BAD 2402
- Waves Are Universal (14 June 2004) 4AD CAD 2414
- Coastline / Plucked single (14 February 2005) 4AD TAD 2501

== Notes and references ==
=== References ===
- Buckley, Peter; Lewis, Justin (1996). Rock: The Rough Guide (1st ed.). Rough Guides. ISBN 978-1-858-28201-5.
- Buckley, Peter; Edroso, Roy (2003). The Rough Guide to Rock (2nd ed.). Rough Guides. ISBN 978-1-84353-105-0. OCLC 936532596.
