= I'm Impressed =

I'm Impressed may refer to:

- "I'm Impressed", a song by Yourcodenameis:milo from their 2007 album They Came from the Sun
- "I'm Impressed", a song by They Might Be Giants from their 2007 album The Else
