= This Is a Fix album tour =

2008 concert tour by the Automatic

- Tour by The Automatic
- Location: United Kingdom
- Associated album: This Is a Fix
- Start date: April 2008
- End date: December 2008

The Automatic concert chronology
- Not Accepted Anywhere album tour (2005–07); This Is a Fix album tour (2008); Tear the Signs Down album tour (2009–10)

The This Is a Fix album tour was the 2008 tour surrounding the release of Welsh band the Automatic's second album This Is a Fix. The first leg of the tour was played at smaller clubs and venues around the United Kingdom, whilst later dates were at some of the countries larger venues.

== Background ==
The band's first tour with new guitarist Paul Mullen involved touring some of the smaller less-known venues and clubs of the United Kingdom. The tour involved the band playing a 50/50 split of old and new material. Many of the songs played on the first album were chosen by the band's fans who set up a poll on their forum. By the time the band began touring "By My Side", "Recover" and "That's What She Said" were all favoured by fans, many of the b-sides were also requested. During performances, synthesizer and keyboard duties would be split between Frost and Mullen. The performances at The Blake Theatre in Monmouth on 28 March, Central Station in Wrexham on 29 March, The Galleri in Caernarfon on 30 March, Brycheiniog Theatre in Brecon 31 March 2008 were all rescheduled after the band required further time to rehearse their new and old songs. On 17 April 2008, NME announced the band would be playing "One of their first shows without keyboardist Alex Pennie". The band performed at the UK release show for the video game Rock Band, the gig was held in a secret location in London. The band headlined the Rock Against Racism Left Field stage with Frank Turner, Kate Nash, Dirty Pretty Things, British Sea Power among other bands performing on the stage over the weekend. The band had to pull out of the small festival after T4 on the Beach rehearsal took place on this date, the band apologised on their website saying; "Due to promotional demands we've had to pull out of the Midsommer Norton show on 19 July. We're really sorry to everyone with tickets who was looking forward to the show but we'll be out on tour again soon". Having a strong love for Irish trio Ash, one of the Automatic's main influences have also, and during earlier days of the band's career they would cover Ash single "Kung Fu" from the album 1977, in June 2007 the Automatic were invited for drinks after their show together at Hull University Summer Ball, later in 2008 at Cardiff Big Weekend Ash dedicated the track "Oh Yeah" to the band, who had played earlier that day. Photographer Peter Hill performed bass guitar for the first time with the band during the band's performance of "This Is a Fix" which sees singer Rob play synth instead of bass. Originally the tour was scheduled to take place in from 14 June 2008 to 24 June 2008 however due to the recording of the album it was pushed back to September.

== Setlist ==
For the club tour the band asked fans to vote for tracks that they wanted to hear from previous album Not Accepted Anywhere, ultimately "That's What She Said", "By My Side", "Lost at Home", "Recover", "Raoul", "On the Campaign Trail" and "Monster" made the setlist for various legs of the tour.

Club tour

- Light Entertainment
- Recover
- Steve McQueen
- Monster
- Secret Police
- Magazines
- By My Side
- This Ship
- Lost at Home
- Sleepwalking/Bad Guy/Make the Mistakes/Accessories/In the Mountains/Responsible Citizen
- That's What She Said
- This Is a Fix
- Raoul

Album tour

- Raoul
- On the Campaign Trail
- Responsible Citizen/Accessories
- In the Mountains
- Monster
- Magazines
- This Ship
- Lost at Home
- This Is a Fix
- Secret Police/That's What She Said
- Recover
- By My Side/Something Else
- Light Entertainment
- Love in This Club
- Steve McQueen

== Tour dates ==
Date	City	Country	Venue	Opening Act(s)
Club tour
April 2008	Exeter	England	Cavern2	Viva Machine
3 April 2008	Gloucester	England	Arts Centre	Viva Machine
5 April 2008	Northampton	England	Soundhaus	Viva Machine
6 April 2008	Stoke	England	Sugarmill	Viva Machine
7 April 2008	York	England	Fibbers	Viva Machine
8 April 2008	Liverpool	England	Academy	Viva Machine
10 April 2008	Dundee	Scotland	Doghouse	Viva Machine
11 April 2008	Inverness	Scotland	Raigmore	Viva Machine
12 April 2008	Aberdeen	Scotland	Cafe Drummond	Viva Machine
14 April 2008	Leeds	England	Cockpit	Viva Machine
15 April 2008	Hull	England	The Welly	Viva Machine
16 April 2008	Tamworth	England	The Palace	Viva Machine
18 April 2008	Middlesbrough	England	Cornerhouse (Sumo)	Viva Machine
19 April 2008	Leicester	England	Charlotte	Viva Machine
20 April 2008	Norwich	England	Arts Centre	Viva Machine; Canterbury
21 April 2008	Hitchin	England	Club 85	Viva Machine; Canterbury
23 April 2008	Brighton	England	Audio	Viva Machine; Canterbury
24 April 2008	Southend	England	Chinnerys	Viva Machine; Canterbury
26 April 2008	Portsmouth	England	Wedgewood Rooms	Viva Machine; Canterbury
28 April 2008	Plymouth	England	White Rabbit	Viva Machine
29 April 2008	Cardiff	Wales	The Point	Viva Machine; Attack Attack
10 May 2008	Monmouth	Wales	Blake Theatre	Viva Machine; Dandelion Killers; Autopilots
11 May 2008	Caernarfon	Wales	Galleri	Viva Machine; Dandelion Killers; Autopilots
12 May 2008	Brecon	Wales	Brycheiniog	Viva Machine; Dandelion Killers; Autopilots
29 May 2008	Wrexham	Wales	Central Station	Viva Machine; Dandelion Killers; Autopilots
25 April 2008	London	England	KOKO	Viva Machine
13 May 2008	London	England	Secret central London location	The Courteeners; The Whip
Festivals
17 May 2008	Brighton	England	The Great Escape Festival	
28 June 2008	Glastonbury	England	Glastonbury Festival	
20 July 2008	Norton	England	Midsommer Norton	
20 July 2008	Weston-super-Mare	England	T4 on the Beach	
2 August 2008	Cardiff	Wales	Cardiff Big Weekend	
5 August 2008	Ibiza	Spain	Ibiza Rocks	
12 August 2008	Hoxton	England	Atticus Live	
13 August 2008	Avenches	Switzerland	Rock Oz'Arenes	
14 August 2008	Gampel	Switzerland	Gampel Open Air Festival	
21 August 2008	Pontypridd	Wales	Pontypridd Muni Arts Centre\	
23 August 2008	Reading	England	Reading Festival	
24 August 2008	Leeds	England	Leeds Festival	
26 August 2008	London	England	HMV	
30 August 2008	Yorkshire	England	Bingley Music Live	
6 September 2008	Cheshire	England	Frodsham Music Festival	
Release tour
27 September 2008	Glasgow	Scotland	University of Strathclyde	Operahouse; Dinosaur Pile-Up
28 September 2008	Oxford	England	Oxford Academy	Operahouse; Dinosaur Pile-Up
29 September 2008	Birmingham	England	Birmingham Academy	Operahouse; Dinosaur Pile-Up
1 October 2008	Newcastle	England	University	Operahouse; Dinosaur Pile-Up
2 October 2008	Manchester	England	Academy 2	Operahouse; Dinosaur Pile-Up
3 October 2008	Glasgow	Scotland	Glasgow Garage	Operahouse; Dinosaur Pile-Up
4 October 2008	Nottingham	England	Rescue Rooms	Everything Everything; Astro Firs
6 October 2008	Sheffield	England	Academy	Everything Everything; Astro Firs
7 October 2008	Bristol	England	Trinity	Everything Everything; Astro Firs
8 October 2008	London	England	Scala	Everything Everything; Astro Firs
10 October 2008	Liverpool	England	Barfly	Iglu And Hartly
uLive tour
2 November 2008	Preston	England	53 Degrees	Nick Harrison
3 November 2008	Liverpool	England	Stanley Theatre	Nick Harrison
4 November 2008	Swansea	England	Sin City	Nick Harrison
6 November 2008	Bath	England	Students Union, Elements	Nick Harrison
7 November 2008	Coventry	England	University of Warwick	Nick Harrison
8 November 2008	Guildford	England	Rubix	Nick Harrison
10 November 2008	Norwich	England	The Waterfront	Nick Harrison
11 November 2008	Essex	England	Students Union	Nick Harrison
12 November 2008	Uxbridge	England	Brunel Students Union	Nick Harrison
13 November 2008	High Wycombe	England	Students Union	Nick Harrison
15 November 2008	Hatfield	England	Hertfordshire Students Union	Nick Harrison
16 November 2008	Leeds	England	University Union	Nick Harrison
17 November 2008	Hull	England	University Union	Nick Harrison
19 November 2008	Bournemouth	England	The Old Fire Station	Nick Harrison
20 November 2008	Reading	England	Students Union	Nick Harrison
21 November 2008	Derby	England	Union	Nick Harrison
8 December 2008	Manchester	England	Academy 1	XFM Christmas Winter Wonderland
20 December 2008	Birmingham	England	Birmingham Asylum	
