= Run & Hide (The Automatic song) =

Single by The Automatic

from the album Tear the Signs Down
- Released: 1 March 2010
- Recorded: Warwick Hall, Cardiff
- Genre: Post-punk revival
- Label: Armored Records, EMI
- Songwriter(s): Robin Hawkins, Paul Mullen, James Frost, Iwan Griffiths

The Automatic singles chronology
"Interstate" (2009)	"Run & Hide" (2010)	"Cannot Be Saved" (2010)

Run & Hide is the second single taken from Tear the Signs Down, the third studio album by Welsh band The Automatic. The single was announced on BBC Radio Wales. Run & Hide was released on 1 March 2010, 1 week prior to Tear the Signs Down on 8 March 2010.

== Music & lyrics ==
The song is the first single to feature Paul Mullen providing lead vocals, it also uses a string arrangement, and was originally titled "Parasol".

== Release ==
The song was performed acoustically with "Steve McQueen", "Interstate" and a cover of "She Wolf" on Alan Thompson's BBC Radio Wales evening show. The song was officially premiered on BBC Radio 1 at 8:55 PM 19 January 2010 on Zane Lowes Show.

== Music video ==
The music video for Run & Hide was shot at the live music venue Cardiff Coal Exchange on 5 January 2010 and features the band playing against an LED light rig and in a cellar, pictures of the shoot were posted on Facebook and Twitter.
