= Interstate (song) =

Single by The Automatic

from the album Tear the Signs Down
- Released: 6 December 2009
- Recorded: Warwick Hall, Cardiff
- Genre: Post-punk revival
- Length: 3:33
- Label: Armored Records, EMI
- Songwriter(s): Robin Hawkins, Paul Mullen, James Frost

The Automatic singles chronology
"Steve McQueen" (2007)	"Interstate" (2009)	"Run & Hide" (2010)

Interstate is the first single from Tear the Signs Down, the third studio album by Welsh alternative rock band The Automatic. The single was released on 6 December, and marks the first release through the band's own record label, Armored Records.

== Music and lyrics ==
Similarly to previous single "Steve McQueen", "Interstate" is considered a bridge between previous record "This Is a Fix" and "Tear the Signs Down". Lyrically and musically however the track is more like material from debut album Not Accepted Anywhere, with the use of synthesizer keyboards and three part vocals – predominantly from Robin Hawkins and Paul Mullen, with backing vocals throughout from James Frost. The track was written and recorded at Warwick Hall of Sound, and according to Paul Mullen was one of the easiest tracks to write, taking mere hours. The lyrics "freedom, no stress, being away from everything and basically driving along a big long road to God knows where" refer to their split with former record label, B-Unique, as well as their experiences of recording previous album This Is a Fix abroad in Los Angeles in 2007.

== Release ==
The track's release details were announced on 3 November 2009, with the announcement of the single "Interstate" and the band's third album Tear the Signs Down. Armored Records, the band's own new record label, was announced on the same day, and would be distributed by EMI. The track was premiered, also on 3 November on XFM, with the music video and song itself available to stream on YouTube, Myspace and the band's official website. In promotion for the single "Something Else", a bonus track from Tear the Signs Down was released as a free download on Music Glue. A week later on Zane Lowe's BBC Radio 1 show on 10 November, vocalist and guitarist Paul Mullen was interviewed about the new single.

The primary location for the music video, outside the Chapter Arts Centre in Cardiff, against a backdrop created by Alan Goulbourne.

The single's artwork sleeve is an abstract painting by vocalist/bassist Robin Hawkins, which uses the logo style from This Is a Fix.

The band reworked the track soon after its release into an acoustic west country style, which was performed in session on BBC Radio Wales and then on Live from Studio Five.

== Music video ==
The music video was directed by Ewan Jones Morris and Casey Raymond, with additional photography by Nicolas Booth. It was filmed on 12 October 2009 at the Chapter Arts Centre in Cardiff.

The video's primary setting uses a backdrop created in 2008 by artist Alan Goulbourne, a 'multi-layered three-dimensional sculptural landscape' which originally was not painted; however, in the video it has been painted red, white and blue, colours which recur throughout the video. Paul Mullen uses a white Gibson SG, Rob Hawkins uses a red bass guitar, Frost plays a blue Gibson Les Paul and Iwan plays a blue drum kit. The women and scrap-heap cars also use these colours.

The concept of the video is based around the stereotype of the American lifestyle, with young girls, fast cars and unhealthy foods.

The narrative follows the band performing the track, whilst several different women are shown consuming various meats, burgers, milkshakes and ice creams, as well as shots of cars being scrapped. The video was premiered on 3 November 2009 on YouTube and Myspace, shortly after the song was initially aired on XFM.

== Track listing ==
Digital download
No.	Title	Length
1.	"Interstate"	3:33

== Credits and personnel ==
- Robin Hawkins – lead vocals, bass guitar
- Paul Mullen – synthesizers, guitar, vocals
- James Frost – guitar, backing vocals
- Iwan Griffiths – drums
- Richard Jackson – production
