= Paul Mullen =

Paul Mullen may refer to:

- Paul Mullen (musician) (born 1982), British musician
- Paul Mullen (rugby union) (born 1991), Irish-American rugby union player

== See also ==
- Paul Mullin (disambiguation)
