= Minor Victories (album) =

Studio album by Minor Victories
- Released: 3 June 2016
- Genre: Dream pop, shoegaze, post-rock
- Length: 49:59
- Label: Fat Possum Records (US); PIAS Recordings (worldwide)

Minor Victories is the self-titled debut studio album by British alternative rock supergroup Minor Victories. It was released on 3 June 2016 on Fat Possum Records and PIAS Recordings.

== Accolades ==
| Publication | Accolade | Year | Rank |
|---|---|---|---|
| Rough Trade | Albums of the Year | 2016 | 30 |

== Critical response ==
Professional ratings
Aggregate scores
| Source | Rating |
|---|---|
| AnyDecentMusic? | 3/5 stars |
| Metacritic | 75/100 |
Review scores
| Source | Rating |
| AllMusic | 4/5 stars |
| The Skinny | 5/5 stars |
| Magnet | 90/100 |
| DIY | 4/5 stars |
| Pop Matters | 8/10 stars |
| Clash | 60/100 |
| Pitchfork | 6.0/10 |
| God Is in the TV | 8/10 stars |
| musicOMH | 3/5 stars |
| State Magazine | 4/10 stars |
| The Music | 6/10 stars |

Minor Victories received critical acclaim from musical critics. On Metacritic, their first album holds an average critics score of 75, based on 17 critics, indicating "Generally favorable reviews". Duncan Harman of The Skinny Magazine said, "Minor Victories is frequently beautiful, and it’s the subtle application of the abrasive (on tracks such as Out To Sea) where this project really comes into its own; a few listens in, and captivation becomes its own reward."

Heather Phares of All Music wrote, "While Minor Victories builds on its members' legacies, the band sounds more excited about the present and the future than looking back." Craig Jones of DIY Magazine wrote, "At no point of this record are you left hoping for another Editors anthem or new Slowdive music--yes that would be wonderful, but we now have Minor Victories to savor. Hopefully they’re here to stay."

Steve Klinge of Magnet Magazine gave the album an "Essential New Music" designation saying, "Minor Victories is a bit like Great Britain’s version of Broken Social Scene with its collaboration among equals and its penchant for glorious, cathartic climaxes."

However, Pitchfork's Evan Rytlewski criticized this album saying, "What’s missing, though, is the central promise of a supergroup: the thrill of hearing established musicians in a truly different context. Minor Victories’ lineup may stem from different circles, but their approaches are so complementary that there's rarely any tension or surprise."

== Track listing ==
| No. | Title | Length |
|---|---|---|
| 1. | "Give up the Ghost" | 3:40 |
| 2. | "A Hundred Ropes" | 3:54 |
| 3. | "Breaking My Light" | 6:25 |
| 4. | "Scattered Ashes (Song for Richard)" | 4:17 |
| 5. | "Folk Arp" | 6:41 |
| 6. | "Cogs" | 3:18 |
| 7. | "For You Always" | 3:50 |
| 8. | "Out to Sea" | 4:09 |
| 9. | "The Thief" | 7:25 |
| 10. | "Higher Hopes" | 6:19 |

== Personnel ==
- Rachel Goswell – vocals, guitar
- Stuart Braithwaite – guitar, backing vocals
- Justin Lockey – guitar, electronics, keyboards
- James Lockey - bass
- Mark Kozelek – vocals on "For You Always"
- James Alexander Graham – vocals on "Scattered Ashes (Song for Richard)"
