= Cannot Be Saved =

Single by The Automatic

from the album Tear the Signs Down
- Released: 20 June 2010
- Recorded: Warwick Hall, Cardiff
- Genre: Post-punk revival
- Length: 2:52
- Label: Armored Records, EMI
- Songwriter(s): Robin Hawkins, Paul Mullen, James Frost, Iwan Griffiths

The Automatic singles chronology
"Run & Hide" (2010)	"Cannot Be Saved" (2010)	"Can I Take You Home" (2010)

"Cannot Be Saved" is the third single by Welsh rock band The Automatic, taken from their third album Tear the Signs Down. The single was released on 20 June 2010 as a digital download.

== Composition ==
"Cannot Be Saved" was penned by Rob Hawkins and is about paranoia, described by Rob as "You know, like in the summer when everyone seems to be on edge and it feels like it could just kick off for no reason". The track predominantly features lead vocals from Robin Hawkins, with Paul Mullen and James Frost providing backing vocals.

== Release ==
"Cannot Be Saved" was announced as the third single from Tear the Signs Down on 19 May 2010 via the band's Facebook page. The artwork is inspired from the Tear the Signs Down art by Rich Samuels, and the design for the single was first used on T-shirts available on the album tour.

== Music video ==
The music video was shot across the January, February and March dates of the Tear the Signs Down album tour, directed by James Frost, with support band Straight Lines helping shoot it. The music video premiered on 2 June 2010 on Rock Sound.
