= Zero Worship =

Zero Worship may refer to:

- "Zero Worship" (Ugly Betty), an episode of the American TV series Ugly Betty
- Zero Worship (album), a 2016 album by Young Legionnaire
