= Bleach Blood =

- Origin: London
- Genres: Alternative rock, indie rock, power pop
- Years active: 2012–present
- Label: Transmission Recordings
- Members: Jamie Jazz; Julia Webb; Tom Aylott; Paul Invisible Frank Lane; Luke Godwin
- Past members: Charlie Elliot; Paul Mullen
- Website: bleachblood.net

Bleach Blood is a dance punk band formed in north east London in 2012 by Jamie Jazz (singer/guitarist, formerly of The King Blues), Paul Mullen (guitarist of The Automatic and formerly Yourcodenameis:Milo, Julia Webb (vocals and keys/synths), Luke Godwin (guitarist), Tom Aylott (bass guitarist) and Paul 'Invisible Frank' Lane (drummer) of The Voodoo Binmen. The band released its first four-track EP titled "Let Your Heart Sing" on 9 December 2012, preceded by a single of the same name. Their debut album All Sides of a Circle, is set to be released via Transmission Record in March 2015, from which three singles, "Anything Anything", "H.O.P.E." and "Pleased To Meet You", have already been released.

== History ==
=== Formation and "Let Your Heart Sing" EP (2012) ===
Three months after The King Blues split up, guitarist Jamie Jazz had been debating whether to stay in music or to "get a real job". He began working on some new "really, really, REALLY punk" material, before arriving at the songs which would comprise the Let Your Heart Sing EP. Jazz and Mullen lived near to each other which led to Jazz playing some of his new material to Mullen, who then introduced him to Charlie Elliot and Paul Lane.

After releasing and recording the "Let Your Heart Sing" EP, tracks were played by BBC Radio 1, Kerrang! Radio and Xfm among others, including a Radio 1 Live Lounge performance for Mike Davies on 23 January 2013, where the next single, "Anything Anything" (featuring Linda Harrison), was played for the first time.

=== "Darling Don't Dive EP" (2014) and new line up ===
In 2014, Bleach Blood released their "Darling Don't Dive EP" for free through their website. On this EP were three new songs and a reworked rendition of "Anything, Anything" ft. Linda Harrison. "Darling Don't Dive without me" was released for Radio airplay and was Single of the week on XFM Radio. Bleach Blood returned in July 2014 with a new line-up and announced the release of their new single for 12 October titled "Pleased to Meet You" Their debut album has been recorded and due to be released early 2015.

=== All Sides of a Circle (2015) ===
Bleach Blood announced in January 2015 that their debut album All Sides of a Circle would be released on 2 March 2015 via Transmission Recordings. Throughout January and February Bleach Blood curated five nights of live music at Camden's The Stillery.

== Discography ==
=== Singles ===
- "Let Your Heart Sing" (Transmission Recordings, 2012)
- "Anything, Anything" (Transmission Recordings, 2013)
- "H.O.P.E." (Transmission Recordings, 2013)
- "Darling Don't Dive Without Me" (Transmission Recordings, 2014)
- "Pleased To Meet You" (Transmission Recordings, 2014)
- "London in the Rain" (Transmission Recordings, 2015)

=== EPs ===
- "The Young Heartbreaker's Club" (Transmission Recordings, 2012)
- "Darling Don't Dive EP" (Transmission Recordings, 2014)

=== Albums ===
- "All Sides of a Circle" (Transmission Recordings, 2015)

== Videography ==
- "Let Your Heart Sing" - Directed by Brendan Cleaves, 2012
- "Anything, Anything" - Directed by Brendan Cleaves, 2013
- "Pleased To Meet You" - filmed at Old Blue Last pub by Natalie Green and Rhys Thomas, 2014
