= Minor Victories =

British rock band

- Genres: Alternative rock; art rock; shoegazing; dream pop; post-rock
- Years active: 2015–present
- Labels: Play It Again Sam; Fat Possum
- Members: Stuart Braithwaite; Rachel Goswell; James Lockey; Justin Lockey
- Website: minor-victories.com

Minor Victories are a British alternative rock supergroup formed in 2015. The band members are vocalist Rachel Goswell (Slowdive), guitarists Stuart Braithwaite (Mogwai) and Justin Lockey (Editors), and film-maker James Lockey of Hand Held Cine Club.

== Formation ==
Rachel Goswell and Justin Lockey had previously made music together. It was through Goswell that Braithwaite and the Lockey brothers met.

The band was unveiled on social media in July 2015 with the announcement of a forthcoming album, including collaborations with other artists including Mark Kozelek of Sun Kil Moon and James Graham of The Twilight Sad. However, Minor Victories was initially a casual idea of two artists collaborating, which later turned into a supergroup. In an interview by the OffBeat Music (OBM) magazine, Stuart Braithwaite said about the formation of the Supergroup:

As the project went on it got better and better until it was finished. Considering how it all was at the start, it seems incredible. Definitely, I was quite surprised.

A few days later a "teaser trailer" named Film One was released featuring short clips of forthcoming songs. In a September 2015 interview with website exclaim.ca, Braithwaite said that the band was working with producer Tony Doogan, that the album was "80% recorded", and that it would be released in early 2016. Asked about how the album would sound, he said "To be honest, I think if you know the music that all of us have made, it won't really surprise you. It has a lot of the good elements from everyone's bands.".

== Band members ==
- Rachel Goswell - vocals, guitar
- Stuart Braithwaite – guitar, backing vocals
- Justin Lockey – guitar, electronics, keyboards
- James Lockey - bass

== Discography ==
- Minor Victories (2016), Fat Possum Records
- Orchestral Variations (2016), Play It Again Sam
