= Paul Mullin (disambiguation) =

Paul Mullin may refer to:

- Paul Mullin (footballer, born 1974), English footballer
- Paul Mullin (footballer, born 1994), English footballer

== See also ==
- Paul Mullen (disambiguation)
