= Zero Worship (album) =

Studio album by Young Legionnaire
- Released: 24 June 2016 (digital); 25 November 2016 (physical)
- Recorded: Spring 2016
- Studios: Turmwerk, Woltersdorf, Germany
- Genres: Post-hardcore, alternative rock
- Length: 40:29
- Label: Superstar Destroyer Records
- Producer: Tom Bellamy

Young Legionnaire chronology
Crisis Works (2011)	Zero Worship (2016)

Singles from Zero Worship
- 1. "Disappear" Released: 16 September 2016; 2. "Heart Attack" Released: 21 October 2016; 3. "Candidate" Released: 21 November 2016

Zero Worship is the second full-length album by Young Legionnaire. The album was pre-released digitally to record backers on 24 June 2016, while the physical version was released on 25 November 2016 on Superstar Destroyer Records.

In early 2014 the band began working on new material and performed a single date at The Garage in Islington, London, where they debuted two new tracks, titled on the setlist as "New 6/8" and "New Arpeg". In February 2015 the band toured as support to Idlewild while continuing to work on new material. In March 2015 Gordon Moakes announced he had left Bloc Party to concentrate on Young Legionnaire. In April 2016 the band announced that their second album would be called "Zero Worship" and pre-released to record backers on 24 June 2016 ahead of a full release on 25 November on LP and CD. Three singles were released with accompanying music videos before the release: "Disappear" on 16 September, "Heart Attack" on 21 October, and "Candidate" on 21 November.

== Track listing ==
All tracks are written by Young Legionnaire.

No.	Title	Length
1.	"Year Zero"	4:52
2.	"Heart Attack"	3:36
3.	"Hail, Hail"	3:18
4.	"Simone"	4:08
5.	"Candidate"	2:48
6.	"Balaclava"	4:14
7.	"Sawn-Off Shotgun"	2:29
8.	"You and Me"	3:48
9.	"Hospital Corners"	3:34
10.	"Disappear"	3:23
11.	"There Will Be an Escape Hatch"	4:19
Total length:		40:29

== Personnel ==
Young Legionnaire

- Paul Mullen – guitar, vocals
- Gordon Moakes – bass
- Dean Pearson – drums

Additional personnel

- Tom Bellamy – producing, additional instrumentation, songwriting input and arrangements
- Dan Austin – mixing
- Rich Whittaker – mastering
