= Ask Me Tomorrow =

Studio album by Mojave 3
- Released: 16 October 1995
- Recorded: 1995
- Studios: EMI Publishing Studio; Blackwing Studios; Mojave 3's home studio
- Genres: Dream pop; alternative country; sadcore
- Length: 41:08
- Label: 4AD
- Producers: Mojave 3; Paul Tipler

Mojave 3 chronology
Ask Me Tomorrow (1995)	Out of Tune (1998)

Singles from Ask Me Tomorrow
- 1. "Love Songs on the Radio" Released: 1995 (radio only)

Ask Me Tomorrow is the debut album by Mojave 3, released by 4AD on 16 October 1995 in the UK and on 16 January 1996 in the US. The album was released roughly eight months after the release of Pygmalion, the third studio album by Mojave 3 founders Neil Halstead, Rachel Goswell, and Ian McCutcheon's previous band Slowdive.

While recording Pygmalion, Neil Halstead began simultaneously writing more acoustic-based songs (inspired by folk musicians) in stark opposition to the ambient electronica of Pygmalion. After Slowdive was dropped by original label Creation Records and subsequent disbandment, a cassette tape of Halstead, Goswell, and McCutcheon's acoustic demos found its way to 4AD founder Ivo Watts-Russell, who was taken by the songs and agreed to sign the trio to his label and release their debut album.

Ask Me Tomorrow was reissued on vinyl (for the first time since its initial release) by UK-based label Sonic Cathedral in May 2017. The repress was limited to 500 copies, pressed on sea-foam green-coloured vinyl, and comes in a gold-mirrored sleeve featuring the original artwork by Vaughan Oliver and Chris Bigg.

== Background and recording ==
Slowdive singer/guitarist Neil Halstead began writing songs in an acoustic vein at his west London flat while simultaneously recording for Slowdive's third album. In an interview with Sonic Cathedral, Halstead said, "I wasn't writing for an album at that point, just messing 'round with an acoustic and listening to a lot of Leonard Cohen and Nick Drake, Townes Van Zandt, Gram Parsons... Almost as a way to relax and change worlds." The new songs stood in stark contrast to the ambient electronic direction that Slowdive was taking on Pygmalion, a direction Halstead described as "so abstract".

Halstead, Rachel Goswell, and Ian McCutcheon were joined by keyboardist Christopher Andrews, and they recorded more songs at their home studio, as well as EMI Publishing Studio in London. Six demo songs on a cassette tape found their way to 4AD label founder and boss Ivo Watts-Russell; the demos were credited to Slowdive. Watts-Russell was initially hesitant to even listen to the tape, considering the fact that they had just recently been dropped by previous label Creation Records. But Watts-Russell eventually played the tape and "instantly adored it". He wanted to release the demos as the band's new album, but Goswell insisted they record more to flesh out a full album. The band, joined by former Chapterhouse guitarist Simon Rowe, convened at Blackwing Studios in southeast London and recorded three more songs to complete the album track listing.

The band's name 'Mojave' was suggested by a friend who thought the music had "a wide-open, desert quality", but since there was already a German band called Mojave, they added the '3' in reference to the band being a trio. A few early CD pressings, however, were printed with the band's name listed as simply 'Mojave'.

== Critical reception ==
Professional ratings
Review scores
Source	Rating
AllMusic	4/5 stars

The Irish Times noted that "there's loads of slide guitar, slow piano and brushed drums and the whole thing sounds as if Stephen Ryan and Tindersticks have got together for a lo fi jam."

AllMusic reviewer Ned Raggett stated, "Arguably it remains the group's high point, flashes of inspiration here and there; as the band grew more straightforwardly authentic and less swathed in an aural cocoon, much of their uniqueness went with them. Here, though, both Goswell and Halstead – along with drummer Ian McCutcheon (more often than not using brushes), pianist Christopher Andrews, and some guests – tapped into a drowsy beauty that ran parallel to the burgeoning alt-country movement without completely sounding like it yet".

== Track listing ==
All tracks are written by Neil Halstead.

No.	Title	Length
1.	"Love Songs on the Radio"	5:48
2.	"Sarah"	3:44
3.	"Tomorrow's Taken"	5:37
4.	"Candle Song 3"	5:26
5.	"You're Beautiful"	3:06
6.	"Where Is the Love"	4:37
7.	"After All"	3:33
8.	"Pictures"	4:21
9.	"Mercy"	4:55

== Personnel ==
Musicians

- Neil Halstead – vocals, guitar
- Rachel Goswell – vocals
- Ian McCutcheon – drums, percussion
- Christopher Andrews – piano
- Simon Rowe – guitar (tracks 7, 9)
- Audrey Riley – cello (tracks 3, 5, 7)

Production

- Mojave 3 and Paul Tipler – producers
- Laura Boussieau – engineer (tracks 2, 3, 6)
- Paul Tipler – engineer (tracks 4, 7, 9)
- Vaughan Oliver and Chris Bigg at v23 – design
- Colin Gray – cover photography
- Mike Folliot – portrait photography

== Charts ==
Chart performance for Ask Me Tomorrow
Chart (2026)	Peak position
Scottish Albums (Official Charts)	64
UK Album Sales (Official Charts)	86
UK Independent Albums (Official Charts)	20
