= Excuses for Travellers =

Studio album by Mojave 3
- Released: 15 May 2000
- Recorded: Fortress Studios 1 & 2, London; Mojave HQ
- Genres: Dream pop, indie rock
- Length: 59:40
- Language: English
- Label: 4AD
- Producers: Mark Van Hoen and Mojave 3

Mojave 3 chronology
Out of Tune (1998)	Excuses for Travellers (2000)	Spoon and Rafter (2003)

Singles from Excuses for Travellers
- 1. "In Love with a View" Released: 3 April 2000; 2. "Any Day Will Be Fine" Released: 1 May 2000; 3. "Return to Sender" Released: 11 September 2000

Professional ratings
Aggregate scores
Source	Rating
Metacritic	77/100
Review scores
Source	Rating
AllMusic	4/5 stars
Entertainment Weekly	A−
NME	7/10
Pitchfork	5.5/10
Rolling Stone	3.5/5 stars

Excuses for Travellers is the third album by Mojave 3, released by 4AD on 15 May 2000 in the UK and 5 September 2000 in the US. It features the singles "In Love with a View," "Any Day Will Be Fine," and "Return to Sender." The album was released to generally positive reviews. At Metacritic, which assigns a normalized rating out of 100 to reviews from mainstream critics, the album has received an average score of 77, based on 15 reviews.

== Track listing ==
All tracks are written by Neil Halstead, except where noted.

No.	Title	Writer(s)	Length
1.	"In Love with a View"		6:09
2.	"Trying to Reach You"		4:47
3.	"My Life in Art"		7:21
4.	"Return to Sender"		4:48
5.	"When You're Drifting"		6:01
6.	"Any Day Will Be Fine"		3:24
7.	"She Broke You So Softly"		5:05
8.	"Prayer for the Paranoid"		3:52
9.	"Bringin' Me Home"	Lyrics by Rachel Goswell; music by Mojave 3	3:50
10.	"Got My Sunshine"	Ian McCutcheon	4:22

US bonus tracks
No.	Title	Length
11.	"Krazy Koz"	4:00
12.	"Always Right"	5:30

== Singles ==
- "In Love with a View" (3 April 2000)
  - 7" vinyl, TAD 2K03
  1. "In Love with a View"
  2. "Prayer for the Paranoid" (electric version)
- "Any Day Will Be Fine" (1 May 2000)
  - CD single, BAD 2K04CD; 7" vinyl, AD 2K04
  1. "Any Day Will Be Fine"
  2. "Krazy Koz"
  3. "Always Right"
- "Return to Sender" (11 September 2000)
  - CD single, BAD 2K17CD; 7" vinyl, AD 2K17
  1. "Return to Sender"
  2. "Yer Feet" (Live with Portuguese fireworks)
  3. "Girl from the North Country"

== Charts ==
2000 chart performance for Excuses for Travellers
Chart (2000)	Peak position
UK Independent Albums (Official Charts)	31

2026 chart performance for Excuses for Travellers
Chart (2026)	Peak position
Croatian International Albums (HDU)	18
Scottish Albums (Official Charts)	50
UK Independent Albums (Official Charts)	29
