= As the Spirit Wanes =

Studio album by Codes in the Clouds
- Released: 18 January 2011
- Studio: Brighton Electric in Brighton, England
- Genre: Post-rock
- Length: 38:59
- Label: Erased Tapes
- Producer: Guy Andrews, Robert Raths, Ryan West, Daniel Hopkinson

Codes in the Clouds chronology
Paper Canyon Recycled (2010)	As the Spirit Wanes (2011)

Professional ratings
Review scores
Source	Rating
Rocksound.tv	(7/10)
Sputnik Music	(3/5)

As the Spirit Wanes is the second studio album by English post-rock band Codes in the Clouds, released on 18 January 2011 on Erased Tapes Records.

== Track listing ==
No.	Title	Length
1.	"Where Dirt Meets Water"	4:54
2.	"Look Back, Look Up"	3:20
3.	"You And I Change Like Seasons"	5:20
4.	"We Were Alive, Together (First Position)"	1:42
5.	"Washington"	4:30
6.	"The Reason In Madness, In Love"	3:54
7.	"Cold Calls"	4:14
8.	"If I'd Have Known It Was The Last (Second Position)"	1:52
9.	"The Tragedian"	4:34
10.	"Your Panopticon"	4:39
Total length:		38:59

== Personnel ==
- Stephen Peeling - guitar
- Ciaran Morahan - guitar
- Jack Major - drums
- Joe Power - bass
- Pete Lambrou - guitar
- Jerome Alexander - string arrangements (track 3)
- Robert Raths - producer
- Ryan West - producer, mixing
- Guy Andrews - producer
- Dan Hopkinson - producer, engineer
- Nils Frahm - mastering
- Joe Pickering - assistant engineer
- Dave Tindale - additional engineer
- Jónas Valt‡sson - artwork
