= Tear the Signs Down album tour =

2009–10 concert tour by the Automatic

- Tour by The Automatic
- Location: United Kingdom; United Arab Emirates
- Associated album: Tear the Signs Down
- Start date: 19 September 2009
- End date: 23 July 2010

The Automatic concert chronology
- This Is a Fix album tour (2008); Tear the Signs Down album tour (2009–10)

The Tear the Signs Down album tour was a tour by the Welsh rock band the Automatic, in support of their third album Tear the Signs Down. The band made their live comeback at Cardiff Barfly on 19 September 2009 and soon after announced a string of dates in November where they would preview new material from their then upcoming album. The band undertook a full UK tour, with plans to tour in Europe and America.

== Background ==
During 2009 the band only played a handful of dates, Jarocin Festival in Poland and Tamworth Midlands Music Festival in July and August, and then their 'comeback performance' on 19 September 2009 in their native Cardiff at Barfly, where they performed new material for the first time. Soon after they announced a small 10 date tour across parts of the United Kingdom, in November 2009. Prior to the November tour the full album tour was also announced, across the England, Scotland and Wales in March 2010. Three sold out London dates were at the start of the tour, at Hoxton Bar and Kitchen, The Borderline and Camden Barfly.

During the March 2010 tour dates the band were supported by Straight Lines and White Belt Yellow Tag. Throughout the tour the Automatic ran a competition via Twitter, giving fans the chance to win a free guest list place every night of the tour.

After the March 2010 tour the band played sporadic gigs and festivals across the summer. They were also favoured to support Ash in April or May on tour, this never became. In late June The Blackout supported the Automatic at a charity performance at Pontypridd Muni Arts Centre, whilst later in July the Automatic supported Funeral for a Friend on their Casually Dressed & Deep in Conversation tour dates.

== Reception ==
Despite NME's poor reaction to the album Tear the Signs Down the magazine praised the performance at Liverpool on 14 March 2010 - also contradicting their album review calling Tear the Signs Down "an impressive third record", Mike Haydock wrote "They look happy, and it's infectious, translating into a hugely impressive, enjoyable show that puts smiles on people's faces. And surely that's the whole point, right?", noting also that hit singles "Steve McQueen", "Monster", "Raoul" and "Recover" all gained the most response.

== Set list ==
Many of the tracks from Tear the Signs Down have been alternated throughout the tour, with "Run and Hide", "Interstate", "Something Else" and "Cannot Be Saved" remaining present at all dates. "Steve McQueen", "Magazines", "This Is A Fix" and "Light Entertainment" along with an alternation of Sleepwalking and other tracks from This Is A Fix. "Monster", "Campaign Trail", "Raoul" and "Recover" have all been present from Not Accepted Anywhere whilst "That's What She Said" and "By My Side" have been included on occasion. You Shout, Keep Your Eyes Peeled, Seriously I Hate You Guys, Team Drama and Rats have yet to be performed with Paul Mullen as a member of the Automatic.

- Interstate
- Recover
- Magazines
- Run and Hide
- Raoul
- Race to the Heart of the Sun
- Monster
- Something Else
- This Is A Fix
- Can I Take You Home
- On The Campaign Trail
- Sleepwalking
- Cannot Be Saved
- Light Entertainment
- Steve McQueen

== Tour dates ==
Date	Location	Country	Venue	Opening Act(s)
First leg
19 September 2009	Cardiff	Wales	Barfly	
3 November 2009	Dubai	United Arab Emirates	Sound City	
10 November 2009	Royal Tunbridge Wells	England	The Forum	
11 November 2009	Southend	England	Chinnerys	
12 November 2009	Kingston upon Thames	England	McCluskys	
13 November 2009	Rhondda	Wales	Cwmparc Hall	
14 November 2009	Wrexham	Wales	Central Station	
20 November 2009	Preston	England	Lava Ignite	
21 November 2009	Ipswich	England	Liquid	
25 November 2009	Sunderland	England	Independent	
26 November 2009	Carlisle	England	Brickyard	
27 November 2009	Stockton-on-Tees	England	Ku Bar	
28 November 2009	Coventry	England	Kasbah	
Second leg
21 January 2010	London	England	Hoxton Bar and Kitchen	
4 February 2010	London	England	The Borderline	
18 February 2010	London	England	Camden Barfly	Autopilots
22 February 2010	Swansea	Wales	Brangwyn	
Third leg
2 March 2010	Swindon	England	12 Bar	Straight Lines
4 March 2010	Exeter	England	Cavern	Straight Lines
5 March 2010	Falmouth	England	Princess Pavilion	Straight Lines
6 March 2010	Yeovil	England	Orange Box	Straight Lines
7 March 2010	Gloucester	England	Guildhall	Straight Lines
8 March 2010	Oxford	England	O2 Academy	Straight Lines
9 March 2010	Colchester	England	Arts Centre	Straight Lines
11 March 2010	Northampton	England	Roadmender 2	Straight Lines
12 March 2010	Stoke	England	Sugarmill	Straight Lines
13 March 2010	Hull	England	Adelphi	Straight Lines
14 March 2010	Liverpool	England	O2 Academy	Straight Lines
16 March 2010	Glasgow	Scotland	King Tuts	White Belt Yellow Tag
17 March 2010	Newcastle	England	O2 Academy Newcastle	White Belt Yellow Tag
18 March 2010	Sheffield	England	O2 Academy	White Belt Yellow Tag
19 March 2010	Manchester	England	Academy	White Belt Yellow Tag
20 March 2010	Leeds	England	Brudenell Social Club	White Belt Yellow Tag
22 March 2010	Norwich	England	Arts Centre	White Belt Yellow Tag
23 March 2010	Nottingham	England	Rescue Rooms	White Belt Yellow Tag
24 March 2010	York	England	Fibbers	White Belt Yellow Tag
25 March 2010	Birmingham	England	O2 Academy	White Belt Yellow Tag
27 March 2010	Brighton	England	Audio	White Belt Yellow Tag
28 March 2010	Bristol	England	Thekla	White Belt Yellow Tag
29 March 2010	Portsmouth	England	Wedgewood Rooms	White Belt Yellow Tag
30 March 2010	London	England	Relentless Garage	White Belt Yellow Tag
31 March 2010	Cardiff	Wales	Barfly	Straight Lines; White Belt Yellow Tag
Fourth leg
25 June 2010	Pontypridd	Wales	Muni Arts Centre	The Blackout; Ladies Love a Superhero; High Demand
18 July 2010	Monmouth	Wales	Monmouth Festival 2010	Festival
23 July 2010	London	England	Wimbledon Calling Festival	Festival
1 August 2010	Southport	England	Jedi Music Festival	Festival
Fifth leg
22 July 2010	Cardiff	Wales	Cardiff University	Funeral for a Friend headline The Automatic; Young Guns
23 July 2010	London	England	Shepherd's Bush Empire	Funeral for a Friend headline The Automatic; Young Guns
