= Mojave 3 =

British band

- Mojave 3 in 1995. From left to right: Neil Halstead, Rachel Goswell, Ian McCutcheon

Background information
- Origin: United Kingdom
- Genres: Dream pop, indie rock, alternative country, folk
- Years active: 1995–2013
- Label: 4AD
- Members: Neil Halstead; Rachel Goswell; Ian McCutcheon; Simon Rowe; Alan Forrester

Mojave 3 were a British rock band consisting of former Slowdive members Neil Halstead (vocals, guitar), Rachel Goswell (vocals, bass) and Ian McCutcheon (drums) alongside keyboardist Alan Forrester and former Chapterhouse guitarist Simon Rowe.

The band formed as a trio shortly after Slowdive's breakup in 1995, with Forrester and Rowe joining after the release of their debut album. Mojave 3 released five albums before going on a hiatus. The band returned to live performances in 2011 but permanently ceased after Goswell and Halstead reformed Slowdive. It was confirmed in June 2026 in an official Slowdive Facebook post that they would not reform.

== History ==
The band initially consisted of a trio, comprising Neil Halstead, Rachel Goswell, and McCutcheon. After Slowdive were dropped by Creation Records, the trio decided to change musical direction to a dream pop/country rock/folk music style, and were signed by 4AD Records. They took on the new name "Mojave," but upon the discovery of another band already using the name, the "3" was added (in reference to the group's three members). Rowe (formerly of Chapterhouse) and Forrester joined shortly after the release of their first album.

Both Halstead (the main songwriter for the band) and Goswell have released solo albums, also for 4AD. McCutcheon founded the band The Loose Salute, who are signed to Heavenly Records and Graveface Records.

Halstead said the band was on hiatus as of 2008, but were planning to release at least one more album in the future. The band returned to playing live in 2011, including gigs supporting Band of Horses. During a radio interview on Israeli radio station Kol HaCampus on 7 May 2011, Halstead said the band were working on new material, and may be recording during the summer; however, nothing materialized.

== Discography ==
=== Albums ===
- Ask Me Tomorrow (16 October 1995) CAD 5013
- Out of Tune (5 October 1998) CAD 8018
- Excuses for Travellers (15 May 2000) CAD 2K05
- Spoon and Rafter (22 September 2003) CAD 2309
- Puzzles Like You (19 June 2006) CAD 2604

=== Singles and EPs ===
Singles

Year	Title	Peak chart positions	Album
Year	Title	UK	Album
1998	"Who Do You Love"	–	Out of Tune
1998	"Some Kinda Angel"	87	Out of Tune
2000	"In Love With a View"	–	Excuses for Travellers
2000	"Any Day Will Be Fine"	89	Excuses for Travellers
2000	"Return to Sender"	–	Excuses for Travellers
2006	"Breaking the Ice"	–	Puzzles Like You
2006	"Puzzles Like You"	–	Puzzles Like You

- "Who Do You Love" (29 June 1998) BAD 8011
- "Some Kinda Angel" (7 September 1998) BAD 8016
- "In Love with a View" (3 April 2000) TAD 2K03
- "Any Day Will Be Fine" (1 May 2000) BAD 2K04
- "Return to Sender" (11 September 2000) BAD 2K17
- "Breaking the Ice" (5 June 2006) BAD 2602
- "Puzzles Like You" (6 November 2006) AD 2615
