= They Came from the Sun =

They Came From the Sun

Studio album by Yourcodenameis:Milo
- Released: 2 April 2007
- Recorded: Like A Cat, Like A Fox Studios, Newcastle
- Genre: Post-hardcore, experimental, post-rock
- Length: 48:19
- Label: V2
- Producer: Justin Lockey

Yourcodenameis:Milo chronology
Print Is Dead Vol 1 (2006)	They Came From the Sun (2007)

Professional ratings
Review scores
Source	Rating
AllMusic	3/5 stars
GigWise	5/5 stars
The Line of Best Fit	(60%)
NME	(7/10)
Drowned in Sound	(7/10)

They Came From the Sun is the second and last album by British post-hardcore band Yourcodenameis:Milo. The album was released on 2 April 2007 under V2 Records. The song "Understand" was originally called 'Second Mater Responds' in relation to the song 'First Mater Responds' which featured on their mini-album "All Roads to Fault". The title was changed to 'Understand' shortly before the album's release.

Videos were made for the singles, "Understand" and "I'm Impressed". "Translate" was released as a free download from the band's website with downloadable artwork.

== Track listing ==
1. "Pacific Theatre" – 3:45
2. "All That was Missing" – 4:49
3. "Understand" – 3:47
4. "I'm Impressed" – 4:39
5. "About Leaving" – 3:16
6. "Sixfive" – 4:30
7. "Translate" – 4:03
8. "Evening" – 5:18
9. "Take to the Floor" – 4:53
10. "To The Cars" – 4:39
11. "Screaming Ground" – 4:20
12. "Dicta Boelcke" – 1:30
