= Paper Canyon =

Studio album by Codes in the Clouds
- Released: 1 June 2009
- Genre: Post-rock
- Length: 39:23
- Label: Erased Tapes
- Producer: Justin Lockey

Codes in the Clouds chronology
Distant Street Lights / Fractures (2007)	Paper Canyon (2009)	Paper Canyon Recycled (2010)

Professional ratings
Review scores
Source	Rating
AllMusic	2.5/5 stars
Rock Sound	8/10
Clash Music	8/10

Paper Canyon is the debut studio album by English post-rock band Codes in the Clouds. It was produced by Justin Lockey and released on Erased Tapes Records in June 2009.

== Background ==
The album was recorded over five days in Doncaster with producer Justin Lockey. According to guitarist Stephen Peeling, the title of the album is a metaphor for the band's music. "The idea is that a canyon is a big, grand indestructible thing. But if you had a paper canyon it'd be fragile in its detail, like our music."

== Music ==
The music of Paper Canyon has been compared to post-rock bands such as Explosions in the Sky and Mono, along with 65daysofstatic, whom the band have called their "idols". Chris Hidden of Rock Sound noted that the songs are "slow burners" that are "not as immediate or obviously melodic as the likes of Explosions in the Sky or This Will Destroy You," but instead build to a "crescendo".

== Critical reception ==
Paper Canyon was released on 1 June 2009 in the UK, Ireland, and Benelux on Erased Tapes Records. It was released on 4 June 2009 in Japan. German and American releases are planned for later in the year. The album received positive critical reviews. Hidden wrote that the album "might not be a classic post-rock record," but that "it brims with potential and suggests what's to come next should be something really special."

== Track list ==
1. "Fractures" (5:20)
2. "Don't Go Awash in This Digital Landscape" (3:21)
3. "Distant Street Lights" (5:06)
4. "We Anchor in Hope" (5:42)
5. "You Are Not What You Think You Are" (9:55)
6. "The Distance Between Us" (10:00)

== Personnel ==
Codes in the Clouds

- Stephen Peeling (guitar)
- Ciaran Morahan (guitar)
- Rob Smith (guitar)
- Jack Major (drums)
- Joe Power (bass)

Additional personnel

- Justin Lockey (production)
- Robert Raths (cover art)
