= We Are Knuckle Dragger =

UK rock band

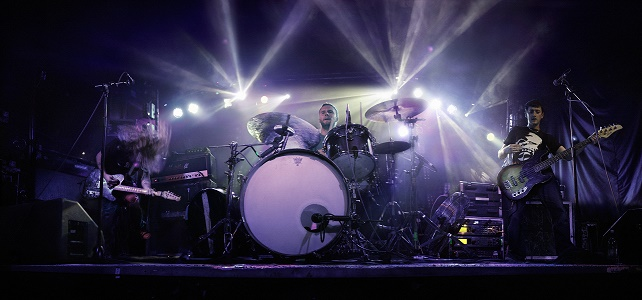
- We Are Knuckle Dragger in 2012

Background information
- Origin: Newcastle, England, and Belfast, Northern Ireland
- Genres: Post-hardcore, mathcore, avant-garde metal, progressive metal
- Years active: 2008–present
- Label: Sapien Records
- Members: Pete Currie; Shaun Abbott
- Past members: Aran Glover
- Website: weareknuckledragger.com

We Are Knuckle Dragger are an English/Northern Irish rock band from Newcastle formed in 2008. The band consists of vocalist/guitarist Aran Glover, bassist Pete Currie and drummer Shaun Abbott. Their debut album Tit for Tat was released in 2012 via Sapien Records and was recorded by Steve Albini. The band's second album The Drone was released in 2013, produced by Ross Robinson.

== History ==
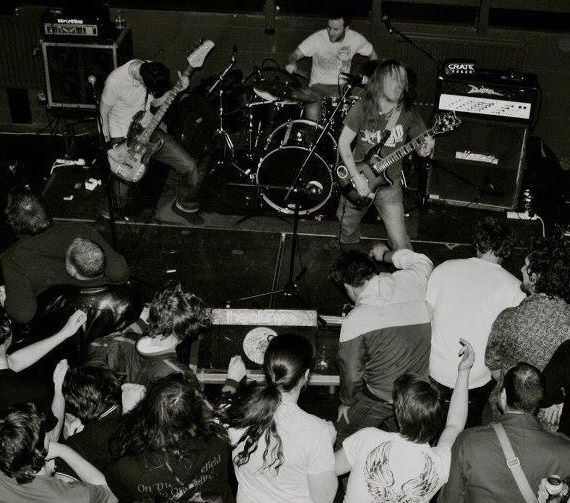
One of the early days of performances

The band was formed in 2008 when long term Irish friends, guitarist Aran and bassist Pete, met up again in Newcastle and enlisted drummer Shaun to start a new project. Their first Extended play, Doors to Rooms, was released in 2010 and their second EP in 2011 named, ABCDEP The band has performed at various radio session and live shows including BBC Radio 1 Rock Show with Daniel P. Carter, The Tom Robinson BBC Radio 6 Music Show, and RockSound. We Are Knuckle Dragger toured with other established bands such as Meshuggah, Animals as Leaders and The Dillinger Escape Plan and performed at festivals including Reading & Leeds Festival 2013.

The band cited influences including Big Black, Shellac, the Chariot, the Dillinger Escape Plan and Meshuggah.

On 26 September 2018, The Newcastle Chronicle reported that Glover died at the age of 35 from suicide.

== Band members ==
- Aran Glover – lead vocals, guitar (2008–2018; his death)
- Pete Currie – bass, backing vocals (2008–present)
- Shaun Abbott – drums, backing vocals (2008–present)

== Discography ==
Studio albums and EPs

- Doors to Rooms (EP) (2010)
- ABCDEP (EP) (2011)
- Tit for Tat (2012)
- The Drone (2013)

== Critical reception ==
Their albums Tit for Tat received particular critical appreciation for the use of heavy metal music.
