= Tear the Signs Down =

Studio album by The Automatic
- Released: UK 8 March 2010; Worldwide 12 April 2010
- Recorded: Cardiff, 2009
- Genres: Indie rock, experimental rock, post-hardcore, post-punk revival
- Length: 37:10
- Label: Armoured Records
- Producer: Richard Jackson

The Automatic chronology
This Is a Fix (2008)	Tear the Signs Down (2010)

Singles from Tear the Signs Down
- 1. "Interstate" Released: 6 December 2009; 2. "Run & Hide" Released: 1 March 2010; 3. "Cannot Be Saved" Released: 20 June 2010

Tear the Signs Down is the third and final album by Wales-based band The Automatic. It was released on 8 March 2010 in the United Kingdom, and then on 12 April 2010 for the rest of the world. Tear the Signs Down was the first album released by the band on their own Armoured Records after splitting with B-Unique. The first single "Interstate" was released on 6 December 2009, with second single "Run & Hide" released a week prior to the album itself on 1 March 2010. Third single "Cannot Be Saved" was released on 20 June 2010.

== Recording and production ==
After record labels B-Unique and Polydor failed to release previous album This Is a Fix on time, or to promote it due to the two labels reportedly falling out, the band made the decision to end their five-album deal. After offers from various record labels the band ultimately decided to set up their own record label Armoured Records giving the band complete creative control, yet the ability to reach a mass audience with EMI contracted to distribute the album. After touring in November 2008 the band returned to the studio, only four months after the release of This Is a Fix.

Throughout the rest of 2008 and up until November 2009 the band worked from their Cardiff recording studio on new material, working on around some 20 ideas, which were eventually reduced to 11 album tracks and an unknown number of B-sides. After the writing and demoing stage, the band worked with Richard Jackson, the producer of a number of tracks on their previous albums Not Accepted Anywhere and This Is a Fix, describing Jackson as 'almost being the fifth member of the Automatic'. The album was eventually recorded with Jackson and Stephen Davies at Warwick Hall Studios in Cardiff, and later mixed at Buffalo Studios and Machine Rooms in Cardiff. In the studio the band worked with Nathan Stone and Carly Worsfold, who provided string sections on the tracks "Run & Hide" and "High Time".

== Background ==
=== Lyrical themes ===
In an interview with Bedfordshire on Sunday vocalist & bassist Rob Hawkins summarised the lyrical construction of all three albums by the Automatic; with Not Accepted Anywhere being about personal experiences and growing up, This Is a Fix was largely based around news and world events, whilst Tear the Signs Down is more about story telling. Lyrically Tear the Signs Down is far more focused, as opposed to This Is a Fix, according to Paul Mullen. The lyrics themselves are mostly written by Hawkins and Mullen, however Iwan Griffiths and James Frost also had an input if a lyric didn't sit right with all four bandmates.

Hawkins and Mullen went through Tear the Signs Down track by track for American website randomville.com, describing the lyrical content of each song on 2 March 2010. Lead track "Insides" is described by Paul Mullen as; "the end of a relationship and the inability to cope with that fact. The build up of anger and tension so that you are ready and primed to break and destroy", and is also noted as being very different to anything the band have previously produced. The lyrics in first single "Interstate" reflect American culture - taken from the band's experience of recording half of previous record This Is a Fix in West Hollywood, California with Butch Walker, the song comments on the Americans' attitude described by Mullen as a "sickly infectious 'sweet dude' attitude they have is a great attribute, anything goes, anything can happen", he also noted the verse section of "Interstate"; "every band is allowed a song where they go 'na na na' and 'oh yeah' this is ours" and that they won't be doing it again. "Cannot Be Saved" was penned by Hawkins and is about paranoia, described by Rob as "You know, like in the summer when everyone seems to be on edge and it feels like it could just kick off for no reason".

The lyrics of "List" tell of how things need to go wrong sometimes in order to ultimately succeed, "It’s about experiencing a lack of your own importance in the world; about people lying to you to supposedly protect you but protect you from what? It's about having your eyes opened you could say", "List" then leads instrumentally into second single "Run & Hide" which Mullen describes as "a feeling, a moment of being to self conscious to let yourself go. It's about the way life can be all about seizing moments without having any guarantees, pushing through all that self-doubt and seeing what happens", similarly "High Time" penned by Mullen is about his lack of motivation; "it's about giving it a go. Whatever it is. Not putting it off, just fucking do it", and "Tear It Down" - the last song written and recorded for Tear the Signs Down is about "pulling yourself out of a bad situation, and shaping things how you want them. In that respect that's what the last year has been for us. A process of facing up to realities, dealing with them and taking charge".

"Sweat Heat Noise", sung by Hawkins, is about the band's live hiatus after touring This Is a Fix in 2008; "it's an optimistic song, it's also about the frustration of waiting for that chance to prove yourself again". The lyrics of "Race to the Heart of the Sun" came from Hawkins; "I had a revelation when I was falling asleep one night, that all human progress is a series of collisions - from cavemen using clubs as tools, to sex, to war to particle accelerators, to cooking everything. That's what this song is about". Mullen noted that the lyrics for "Can I Take You Home" came from an experience at the Egyptian pyramids, where he saw a German woman who he shared eye contact with for a moment. "Something Else" is musically and lyrically a nod towards the band's influences.

=== Style ===
Tear the Signs Down is closer to the style of the band's debut album Not Accepted Anywhere, with the use of more synthesizer parts and three-part-vocals from Hawkins, Frost and Mullen. The album uses the band's trademark pop hooks, with big choruses, whilst maintaining the band's rock edge, it is also the band's most diverse record yet, being compared to Soulwax and the Knife. First single "Interstate" bridges between This Is a Fix and Tear the Signs Down, with the lyrics referring to recording the previous album abroad in the US, the record as a whole has also been described as their most diverse yet. Single "Run & Hide" along with "High Time" and two interludes feature additional string instrumentalists.

== Release ==
The first track from Tear the Signs Down, "Something Else", was previewed on YouTube and the band's official website on 6 August 2009 Months later the album's release date was set for 15 February 2010 with the announcement of first single "Interstate" on 3 November 2009, along with the album's title Tear the Signs Down, as well as the first radio play of "Interstate" and the free download of album bonus track "Something Else". On Soccer AM the band changed the album's release to 8 March 2010. The band's promotional company Chuff Media confirmed that the album would be released on 8 March, with second single "Run & Hide" a week before on 1 March 2010. The album leaked onto the internet on 20 February 2010, just over two weeks before the release date.

The album was released digitally worldwide, with the exception of the United States on 12 April 2010.

=== Split from B-Unique ===
In 2005 the band were given a five album record deal with B-Unique Records, distributed by Columbia Records in the United States and Polydor Records everywhere else. With the release of their second album This Is a Fix, the departure of Alex Pennie and arrival of Paul Mullen the band's sound had changed, which was something that B-Unique were not entirely happy with, as well as this record labels B-Unique and Polydor supposedly fell out leading towards This Is a Fix receiving barely any promotion.

You put a year of your life into making a record, then the label doesn't tell anyone it's released or distribute it. It was very frustrating – we had a complicated deal where we were signed to B-Unique but releasing through Polydor. We suspect that the two parties involved fell out, and we were the child of the divorce, so to speak.

— Rob Hawkins

The split itself took place in 2009, with the band giving up release plans for single "Magazines" and instead heading into the studio to work on their third album. After splitting with Polydor and B-Unique, the band had several offers from other record labels – however, they declined with the vision of setting up their own record label, to have complete creative control over the music that they would release on their next record. Instead of signing a record deal, the band chose a deal with EMI to distribute Tear the Signs Down, giving the label no creative control, and setting up their own record label Armored Records.

=== Promotion ===
First single "Interstate" was broadcast on 3 November on XFM, with BBC Radio 1 DJs Zane Lowe and Fearne Cotton picking the single up throughout the following days whilst the music video for "Interstate" was premiered on the same day on YouTube, soon being added to the MTV Two playlist. "Interstate" was performed live on the 2009 Children in Need BBC One program on 21 November 2009. The band set off on a twelve-date UK tour in November 2009, as well as announcing a full 26-date UK tour in 2010, with plans hinted at for touring in the United States, Europe and Australia. In December 2009 the band appeared in session on BBC Radio Wales, where they performed acoustic versions of "Steve McQueen", "Interstate", a cover of "She Wolf" and second single from Tear the Signs Down "Run & Hide". Later the band appeared on Five program Live from Studio 5, where they performed an acoustic version of "Interstate". On 19 December they made a second appearance on Sky program Soccer AM. The band recorded a "stripped down" session for ITV Wales & West on 18 January 2010, which has yet to be aired. On 26 January 2010 the music video for "Run & Hide" premiered on YouTube. Another stripped down set was recorded on 23 February for Wales Online.

=== Touring ===
During 2009 the band only played a handful of dates, Jarocin Festival in Poland and Tamworth Midlands Music Festival in July and August, and then their 'comeback performance' on 19 September 2009 in their native Cardiff at Barfly, where they performed new material for the first time. Soon after they announced a small 10-date tour across parts of the United Kingdom in November 2009. Prior to the November tour the full album tour was also announced, across the England, Scotland and Wales in March 2010. Three sold-out London dates were at the start of the tour, at Hoxton Bar and Kitchen, the Borderline and Camden Barfly. The band planned to tour in Europe and America at some point in 2010, as well as plans to tour with Ash in April or May.

== Reception ==
Professional ratings
Review scores
Source	Rating
Allmusic	2.5/5 stars
AltSounds	(77%)
BBC	(negative)
contactmusic.com	(favorable)
Kerrang!	3/5 stars
musicOMH	2/5 stars
NME	(5/10)
Rock Sound	(9/10)
The Skinny	1/5 stars
Sputnik Music	2/5 stars

The Automatic's third album received both negative and positive critical feedback. Tim Newbound of Rock Sound held high praise for the album, rating it 9/10; praising the band's development as musicians describing the lyrical content of Tear the Signs Down as "soulful, impassioned sensibility that's equally impressive and touching" and that "Tear the Signs Down will surely stand out as one of the finest British records of the year". Kerrang!'s Steve Beebee noted the "slick compromise between the 2006 pop-rock debut Not Accepted Anywhere and the rowdy, Foo Fighters-inspired edge on 2008's This Is a Fix, likening Paul Mullen's vocals to that of Placebo's Brian Molko, whilst disliking the band's "attempt to be arty" in track "High Time", but ultimately praising the band's determination to "keep growing".

"What's that coming over the hill, is it a monster, is it a monster? No, it's only the return of the rather pointless Welsh band" was the opening to Nick Mitchell of Scottish magazine the Skinny's review of Tear the Signs Down, calling the record "neutered punk, lobotomised indie, [and] whitewashed rock" and rating it one out of 5 stars. Sputnikmusic's reviewer Davey Boy was also highly negative; "There really is not that much more to say about Tear the Signs Down... It is just so underwhelming and unengaging", calling it the most forgettable album of the last year "What some of these songs wouldn't give to have Pennie squealing in the background to make them somehow memorable", rating it two out of five.

Rob Crossan of BBC Music compared the album's style to that of the Kaiser Chiefs, claiming that the band had made "an effort to break the charts rather than a statement of singular, ambitious intent", going onto call it "one of the most disappointing albums of 2010". NME reacted negatively toward the album also, giving it half marks at 5/10, claiming that the band had a lack of confidence in order to drive the album.

== Track listing ==
All lyrics are written by Robin Hawkins & Paul Mullen; all music is composed by Robin Hawkins, James Frost, Paul Mullen & Iwan Griffiths.

Tear the Signs Down
No.	Title	Lead vocals	Length
1.	"Insides"	Paul Mullen	4:11
2.	"Interstate"	Robin Hawkins/Paul Mullen	3:35
3.	"Cannot Be Saved"	Robin Hawkins	2:51
4.	"List" (Contains "Run & Hide" strings interlude)	Robin Hawkins/Paul Mullen	3:36
5.	"Run & Hide"	Paul Mullen	3:24
6.	"Sweat Heat Noise"	Robin Hawkins	3:17
7.	"High Time" (Contains "There's Never Been a Better Time" interlude at 3:56)	Paul Mullen	4:39
8.	"Race to the Heart of the Sun"	Paul Mullen/Robin Hawkins	3:33
9.	"Can I Take You Home"	Paul Mullen	3:05
10.	"Something Else"	Paul Mullen	1:38
11.	"Tear It Down"	Robin Hawkins	3:17
Total length:			37.00

== Personnel ==
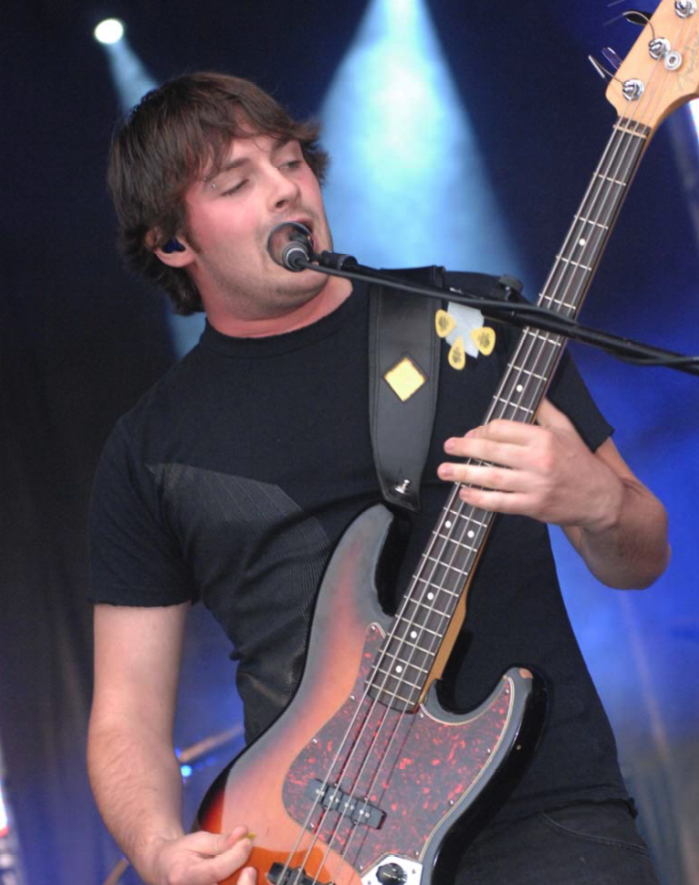
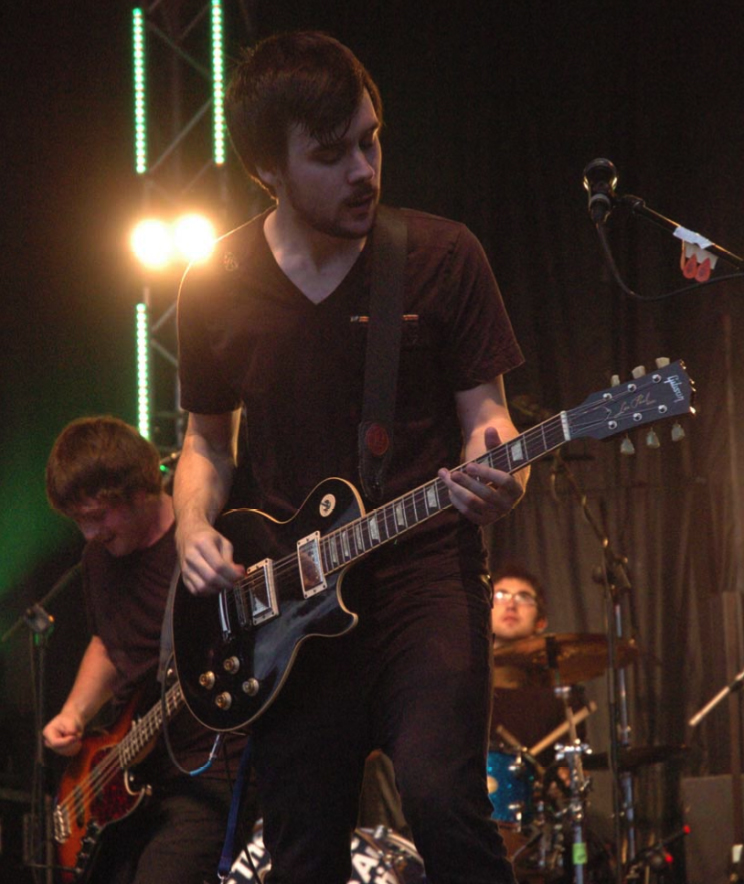
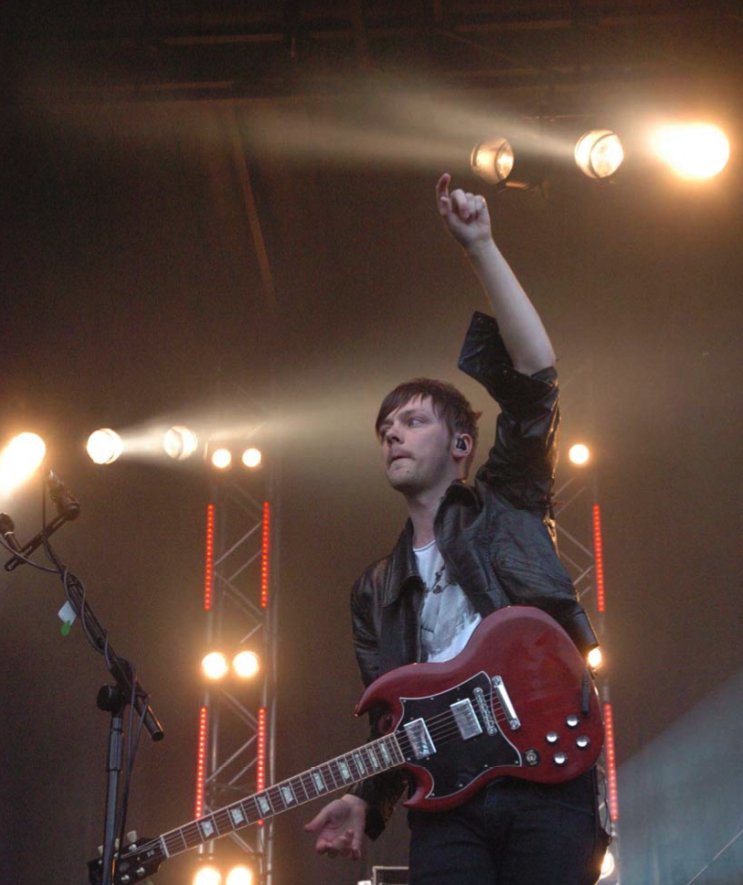
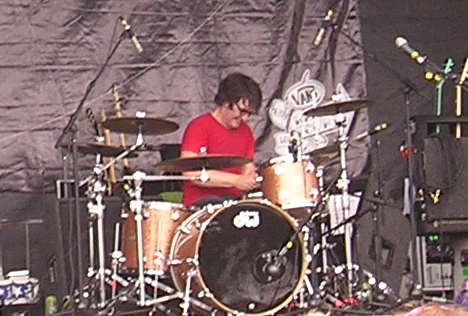
(left to right) Robin Hawkins, James Frost, Paul Mullen and Iwan Griffiths

The Automatic

- Robin Hawkins - vocals, bass, synthesiser
- James Frost - vocals, guitar, bass, synthesiser
- Paul Mullen - vocals, guitar, synthesiser
- Iwan Griffiths - drums

Additional musicians

- Nathan Stone - cello
- Carly Worsfold - violin

Production

- Richard Jackson - producer
- Stephen Davies - additional engineering

Artwork

- Mei Lewis - photography
- Rich Samuels - artwork graphics
