= Out of Tune (album) =

Out Of Tune

Studio album by Mojave 3
- Released: 5 October 1998
- Studios: Cava Sound Workshops; The Farm, Tywardreath; Fortress, London
- Genres: Dream pop, alternative country
- Length: 39:44
- Language: English
- Label: 4AD
- Producers: Mark Van Hoen, Mojave 3

Mojave 3 chronology
Ask Me Tomorrow (1995)	Out Of Tune (1998)	Excuses for Travellers (2000)

Singles from Out of Tune
- 1. "Who Do You Love" Released: 29 June 1998; 2. "Some Kinda Angel" Released: 7 September 1998

Out of Tune is the second album by Mojave 3, released in 1998.

== Critical reception ==
Professional ratings
Review scores
Source	Rating
AllMusic	4/5 stars
The Encyclopedia of Popular Music	3/5 stars
Pitchfork Media	6.3/10
Rolling Stone	3.5/5 stars

Rolling Stone called the album "stunning" and "an unerring collection of floating, giant little moments." The Washington City Paper wrote that the album "showcases [Neil] Halstead’s considerable songwriting talent." The A.V. Club praised the band's "subtle and simple, yet surprisingly full-sounding, instrumentation, which includes doses of organ, horns, and pedal-steel guitar."

== Track listing ==
All tracks are written by Neil Halstead.

No.	Title	Length
1.	"Who Do You Love"	3:31
2.	"Give What You Take"	4:27
3.	"Some Kinda Angel"	3:44
4.	"All Your Tears"	4:38
5.	"Yer Feet"	4:15
6.	"Caught Beneath Your Heel"	6:12
7.	"This Road I'm Travelling" (bonus track on U.S. CD release only)	5:31
8.	"Keep It All Hid"	3:57
9.	"Baby's Coming Home"	5:37
10.	"To Whom Should I Write"	3:23

== Personnel ==
Band members

- Neil Halstead – vocals, guitar
- Rachel Goswell – bass, backing vocals
- Ian McCutcheon – drums, tambourine, shaker
- Simon Rowe – electric guitar
- Alan Forrester – organ, piano

Other musicians

- B.J. Cole – pedal steel guitar on 2 and
- Roman Breslin – trombone on 1 and 3
- Mick Cooke – trumpet on 1 and 3
- Lisa Millett – vocals on 6

== Charts ==
1998 chart performance for Out of Tune
Chart (1998)	Peak position
UK Independent Albums (Official Charts)	44

2026 chart performance for Out of Tune
Chart (2026)	Peak position
Scottish Albums (Official Charts)	95
UK Independent Albums (Official Charts)	38
