= Crisis Works =

Studio album by Young Legionnaire
- Released: 9 May 2011
- Genre: Post-hardcore
- Length: 44:45
- Label: Wichita
- Producer: Rich Jackson

Young Legionnaire chronology
| Crisis Works (2011) | Zero Worship (2016) |

Singles from Crisis Works
- 1. "Numbers" Released: 2 May 2011

Crisis Works is the debut LP from Young Legionnaire. The album was released on 9 May 2011 on Wichita Records. The album was produced by Rich Jackson who has worked with Future of the Left and The Automatic.

== Reception ==
=== Critical response ===
Professional ratings
Aggregate scores
| Source | Rating |
|---|---|
| Metacritic | 69/100 |
Review scores
| Source | Rating |
| AllMusic | 4/5 stars |
| Alternative Press | 3/5 stars |
| BBC Music | favourable |
| Kerrang! | 3/5 stars |
| NME | 7/10 |
| musicOMH | 4/5 stars |
| Rock Sound | 9/10 |

Crisis Works received generally positive reviews, scoring a 69 out of 100 ("generally favorable reviews") on Metacritic based on six reviews.

== Track listing ==
| No. | Title | Length |
|---|---|---|
| 1. | "Twin Victory" | 3:20 |
| 2. | "Numbers" | 3:21 |
| 3. | "Chapter, Verse" | 5:16 |
| 4. | "Even The Birds" | 3:50 |
| 5. | "Black Lions" | 3:29 |
| 6. | "A Hole in the World" | 4:44 |
| 7. | "These Arms" | 3:31 |
| 8. | "Blood Dance" | 3:23 |
| 9. | "Nova Scotia" | 3:50 |
| 10. | "Mortgage Rock" | 3:32 |
| 11. | "Youth Salute" | 3:07 |
| 12. | "Futures Finished" | 3:26 |
