= Puzzles Like You =

Studio album by Mojave 3
- Released: 19 June 2006
- Genre: Guitar pop
- Length: 41:16
- Label: 4AD (CAD 2604)
- Producer: Mojave 3

Mojave 3 chronology
Spoon and Rafter (2003)	Puzzles Like You (2006)

Professional ratings
Review scores
Source	Rating
AllMusic	4/5 stars
Pitchfork Media	7.2/10

Puzzles Like You is the fifth and final studio album by the British band Mojave 3, released on 19 June 2006. The album was regarded as taking the band away from their old sound and leading into a more uptempo style. It was released to fair reviews, averaging a 69 on Metacritic.

== Track listing ==
1. "Truck Driving Man" – 3:33
2. "Puzzles Like You" – 2:16
3. "Breaking the Ice" – 4:06
4. "Running with Your Eyes Closed" – 2:13
5. "Most Days" – 4:24
6. "Big Star Baby" – 4:20
7. "Ghostship Waiting" – 3:07
8. "Kill the Lights" – 3:15
9. "You Said It Before" – 3:50
10. "To Hold Your Tiny Toes" – 3:27
11. "Just a Boy" – 3:03
12. "The Mutineer" – 3:42

== Singles ==
- "Breaking the Ice" (5 June 2006)
  - CD single, BAD 2602CD; 7" vinyl, AD 2602
  1. "Breaking the Ice"
  2. "Star in the Sky"
  3. "Bright Lights"
- "Puzzles Like You" (6 November 2006)
  - Digital single, EAD 2615S; 7" vinyl, AD 2615
  1. "Puzzles Like You"
  2. "Bad World"
  3. "In Your Head"
