= Eddy Temple-Morris =

The Honourable Eddy Temple-Morris
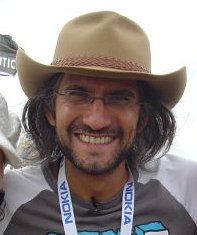
- Eddie Temple-Morris in 2005

Background information
- Born: Edward Owen Kayvan Temple-Morris; 26 April 1965 (age 61); Cardiff, Wales
- Occupations: DJ, record producer, TV presenter
- Years active: 1988–present

Edward Owen Kayvan Temple-Morris (born 26 April 1965 in Cardiff) is a British DJ, record producer and TV presenter. He hosted London radio station XFM's specialist show The Remix for 15 years, before moving it to Soho Radio. He joined Virgin Radio UK in 2017 and currently presents afternoons on weekdays (Virgin Radio Legends UK).

== Biography ==
Temple-Morris is the son of the late Labour peer and former Conservative MP Peter Temple-Morris and was educated at Malvern College in Malvern, Worcestershire.

In a Facebook video, Eddy related his touring work and experiences with The Prodigy particularly suggesting reverting to an earlier structure for the track Firestarter.
