= Ignoto =

Studio album by Yourcodenameis:Milo
- Released: 18 April 2005
- Genre: Post-hardcore
- Length: 53:09
- Label: Fiction/Polydor
- Producer: Flood, Yourcodenameis:Milo

Yourcodenameis:Milo chronology
All Roads to Fault (2004)	Ignoto (2005)	Print Is Dead Vol 1 (2006)

Professional ratings
Review scores
Source	Rating
God Is in the TV	4/5 stars
The Guardian	4/5 stars
Playlouder	4/5 stars

Ignoto is the debut album by the British post-hardcore band Yourcodenameis:Milo and was released in 2005 on Fiction/Polydor. The album develops the strong sci-fi/post-hardcore sound of the group from their first mini album, All Roads to Fault. Upon its release despite not being a commercial success, it was well received by critics.

A striking feature of the album is the cover artwork, which was produced by renowned designer Storm Thorgerson (with Peter Curzon and photographer Rupert Truman), who has also produced artwork for such memorable albums as The Dark Side of the Moon by Pink Floyd (with Hipgnosis) and recently Frances the Mute by The Mars Volta. The photograph is of a distressed man sitting in a room lit by a bare lightbulb. The walls are covered in hundreds of light switches (the theme of the rest of the album's artwork), with a girl dressed in red seen to be lying, lifeless, in an adjacent and similarly decorated room. The girl in red makes other appearances in the artwork.

The tracks "17", "Rapt. Dept." and "Schteeve" were all released as singles or EPs.

The Universal Special Edition release features a rounded CD case, differing from the standard jewel-box case.

== Track listing ==
1. "I Am Connecting Flight" – 2:57
2. "17" – 3:16
3. "Titan Grip" – 3:06
4. "Rapt. Dept." – 4:12
5. "Schteeve" – 4:13
6. "Team Radar" – 5:07
7. "FiveFour" – 4:43
8. "Yesterday's Head" – 4:07
9. "Empty Feat" – 3:40
10. "2-Stone" – 3:01
11. "The General" – 3:19
12. "Audition / Unfinished Drawings of Cats" – 11:22
