= Spoon and Rafter =

Studio album by Mojave 3
- Released: 22 September 2003
- Genre: Dream pop, alternative country
- Length: 50:00
- Label: 4AD (CAD 2309)
- Producer: Mark Van Hoen, Neil Halstead

Mojave 3 chronology
Excuses for Travellers (2000)	Spoon and Rafter (2003)	Puzzles Like You (2006)

Professional ratings
Review scores
Source	Rating
AllMusic	3.5/5 stars
Pitchfork	(6.6/10)

Spoon and Rafter is the fourth album by the British country rock-folk group Mojave 3, released on 22 September 2003 in the UK, and a day later in the US. It was received to generally positive reviews, averaging a 76 on Metacritic. The songs "Billoddity" and "Bluebird of Happiness" were featured in two episodes of The O.C. ("The Heartbreak" and "The Telenovela" respectively).

== Track listing ==
1. "Bluebird of Happiness" – 9:16
2. "Starlite #1" – 4:56
3. "Billoddity" – 4:18
4. "Writing to St. Peter" – 5:58
5. "Battle of the Broken Hearts" – 6:38
6. "Hard to Miss You" – 2:50
7. "Tinkers Blues" – 5:09
8. "She's All Up Above" – 3:38
9. "Too Many Mornings" – 3:16
10. "Between the Bars" – 5:02
