= Codes in the Clouds =

English post-rock band

- Origin: Kent, England
- Genres: Post-rock
- Years active: 2007–present
- Label: Erased Tapes
- Members: Stephen Peeling; Ciaran Morahan; Jack Major; Joe Power
- Website: http://codesintheclouds.net/ Official Website http://codesintheclouds.bandcamp.com/ Bandcamp Page

Codes in the Clouds are an English post-rock band formed in July 2007. Consisting of Dartford, Kent natives Stephen Peeling, Ciaran Morahan, Jack Major and Joe Power, the group's music is instrumental post-rock. They have previously been signed with the independent London-based label Erased Tapes Records and Australian based label Hobbledehoy Records. They are currently signed to Erased Tapes Music for publishing.

== Discography ==
=== Studio albums ===
- Paper Canyon (2009)
- As the Spirit Wanes (2011)
- Codes in the Clouds (2019)
- Piano Re-Works (2020)

=== Singles and EPs ===
- Distant Street Lights / Fractures (2007)

=== Remixes ===
- Paper Canyon Recycled (2010)
- Sixes and Seventeens (Versions) feat. Mogwai & 65daysofstatic (2021)

== Members ==
- Stephen Peeling (guitar)
- Ciaran Morahan (guitar)
- Jack Major (drums)
- Joe Power (bass)

== See also ==
- List of post-rock bands
