= White Belt Yellow Tag =

British alternative rock band

- Origin: United Kingdom
- Genres: Alternative rock Noise rock
- Years active: 2008-present
- Labels: Distiller Records
- Members: Justin Lockey; Craig Pilbin; Tom Bellamy
- Website: MySpace page

White Belt Yellow Tag are a British alternative rock band, formed by former Yourcodenameis:milo guitarist Justin Lockey and Craig Pilbin. When performing live, Tom Bellamy (formerly of The Cooper Temple Clause) plays drums.

Talking about the project's name, Lockey said "To be honest naming a band is the worst thing in the world ever. It's the hardest thing. Trying to come up with a name that doesn't make you cringe when you say it out loud". "It doesn't start with 'The' and end in 'S' which is a plus point – we like the name and I think it's the furthest I got in taekwondo when I was about seven."

They released their debut EP You're Not Invincible on 9 April 2009, with the title track being named as 'Track of the Day' on Q magazine's website.

== Discography ==
=== Albums ===
- Methods (2010)

=== Singles and EPs ===
- You're Not Invincible EP (2009)
- "Tell Your Friends (It All Worked Out)" (2009)
- Remains EP (2009)
- "Always and Echoes" (2010)
