= All Roads to Fault =

EP by YOURCODENAMEIS:MILO
- Released: 10 May 2004
- Recorded: Electrical Audio, Chicago
- Genre: Post-hardcore
- Length: 25:39
- Label: Polydor
- Producer: Steve Albini

YOURCODENAMEIS:MILO chronology
All Roads to Fault (2004)	Ignoto (2005)

Professional ratings
Review scores
Source	Rating
AllMusic	3.5/5 stars
Drownedinsound	7/10 stars
The Independent	4/5 stars

All Roads to Fault is an EP by British experimental post-hardcore band Yourcodenameis:Milo, released in 2004. The most recent edition of the album features music videos for "All Roads to Fault" and "The Problem", which were both released as singles.

== Track listing ==
1. "All Roads to Fault" – 2:45
2. "The Problem" – 2:38
3. "Iron Chef" – 5:16
4. "First Mater Responds" – 3:31
5. "Fourthree" – 2:59
6. "Lions, Then The Donkeys" – 4:05
7. "Rob The Hed" – 4:21
