= Yourcodenameis:milo =

English band

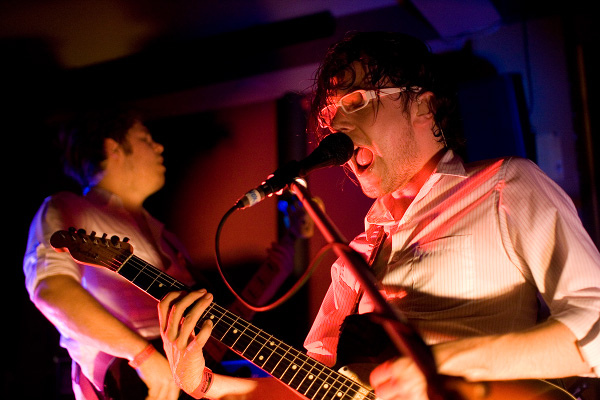

Background information
- Origin: Washington, Tyne and Wear, England
- Genre: Post-hardcore
- Years active: 2002–2007, 2020–present
- Labels: V2, Fiction, Polydor
- Spinoffs: White Belt Yellow Tag, We Are Knuckle Dragger
- Past members: Adam Hiles; Justin Lockey; Paul Mullen; Ross Harley; Paul 'Bez' Gamble-Beresford; Shaun Abbott
- Website: Official website

Yourcodenameis:milo is an English post-hardcore band from Washington, Tyne and Wear. Their mini album, All Roads to Fault, was released in 2004, followed in 2005 by the full-length album Ignoto, both on Fiction/Polydor Records. In 2006, the band left their Polydor contract and within a month signed a new record deal with V2 Records. In November 2006, the band released Print Is Dead Vol 1, a side-project album featuring collaborations with other bands. Their second full-length album, They Came from the Sun, was released in 2007.

The band reformed in 2020 to perform a set of charity concerts in aid of The Cluny in Newcastle.

Due to the pandemic, the scheduled gigs in 2020 were postponed, but with the help of funding, the Cluny venue was able to host the band's recent shows. The band donated all proceeds from the gigs to the Sir Bobby Robson Cancer Research Charity, and both dates were completely sold out.

In April 2023, Paul Mullen and Justin Lockey revealed in an interview with NME that Yourcodenameis:milo was working on new music, which would be their first since their 2007 album, "They Came from the Sun."

Yourcodenameis:milo performed at ArcTanGent Festival in August 2023.

== History ==
Adam Hiles, Paul "Bez" Gamble-Beresford and Ross Harley met through studying English Literature together at A-Level in Washington, Tyne and Wear. They formed Yourcodenameis:milo together, named after Milo Minderbinder from the novel Catch 22. In this early incarnation, Gamble-Beresford and Adam Hiles played guitar, while Harley played bass. They rarely wrote original songs, mostly covering Led Zeppelin, Rage Against the Machine, Red Hot Chili Peppers, Free, Cream, U2 and Radiohead. Gamble-Beresford and Hilessoon left Washington to go to university, however when they would return home Yourcodenameis:milo would continue to perform, with Gamble-Beresford now on drums. They met Justin Lockey because he organised shows in the student of Northumbria University, where Hiles attended. Hiles gave Lockey a CD of the band's songs and, in response, Lockey asked if he could join as guitarist. They met Paul Mullen when Mullen asked Yourcodenameis:milo would open an upcoming show for his band No Apparent Reason, and soon asked him to fill in as vocalist. They sent a demo to John Peel, who called the band back to tell them it didn't play but he was fascinated by the band's name and invited them to record a Peel Session. It was aired on BBC Radio 1 on 28 February 2003. Around the session's release, they organised shows in Washington, Newcastle Upon Tyne and London. At the Newcastle date, they were approached by A&R representative who signed them to Polydor Records. For the signing, they told Mullen he would now be an official member, taking up guitar duties in a addition to vocals.

=== All Roads to Fault and Ignoto ===
The band's first mini album, All Roads to Fault, was recorded by Steve Albini and released in 2004. It was followed by the full-length album Ignoto, in 2005, released on Fiction/Polydor Records. In 2006, the band left their Polydor contract and signed a new record deal with V2 Records within a month. In November 2006, the band released Print Is Dead Vol 1, a side-project album featuring collaborations with other bands. The band's second full-length album, They Came from the Sun, was released on 2 April 2007.

=== Print is Dead Vol 1 ===
On 6 November 2006, the band released its first side project album, entitled Print Is Dead Vol 1. The album has Youcodenameis:Milo collaborating with other bands, including Tom Vek, Get Cape. Wear Cape. Fly, The Futureheads, Field Music, Reuben, The Automatic, Martin Grech, Hot Club De Paris, Maxïmo Park, Lethal Bizzle and Bloc Party. Print Is Dead was recorded between sessions for Yourcodenameis:milo's second album and during their trip to play shows in New Delhi, India. The album was written, recorded, and mixed at the band's studio under the arches of Byker Bridge, and named Like A Cat, Like A Fox, after the original title for their first album.

On 16 January 2006, the band announced that drummer Paul Gamble-Beresford had left under amicable circumstances and would be replaced by Shaun Abbott.

=== They Came From the Sun ===
The band released its second full-length studio album, They Came from the Sun, on 2 April 2007. They also set up their own General Recordings imprint through V2 and began work on more recordings for Print Is Dead Volume II, in addition to several Brian Eno-inspired ambient works which may one day be released.

Justin Lockey was absent during all live performances for the band's UK tours in 2007 due to a shoulder injury.

=== Hiatus ===
The band decided to go on an indefinite hiatus on 21 August 2007. In a statement, they said:

After 5 years and 4 wicked cool records, we have decided to put Yourcodenameis:milo on an indefinite [sic] hiatus.

Mullen suggested that Yourcodenameis:milo was likely to return in the future, saying, "I have mentioned in the past that Milo isn't dead. Just resting. He's got some unfinished business. When will he wake? I don't know. Once in a while, Milo meets with his old friends in The Cluny and has a big fuck off burger. Maybe when the burgers run out."

On 19 October 2007, Rock Sound reported that Paul Mullen would be the new addition to the band The Automatic, following the departure of keyboardist Alex Pennie. Not as a direct replacement, but taking on the role of guitarist, vocalist and keyboardist.

On 26 November 2007, the guitarist Justin Lockey's new band, British Expeditionary Force, released its first album, Chapter One: A Long Way From Home, to critical acclaim.

The band's second drummer, Shaun Abbott, joined Newcastle band We Are Knuckle Dragger in 2008. Adam Hiles plays guitar with The Eye Jab, now Mammal Club. Ross Harley joined Tomahawks For Targets.

=== Reformation ===
In 2020, the band announced their return from hiatus to play some charity concerts in aid of The Cluny in Newcastle. However, due to the COVID-19 pandemic, these were postponed until April 2023. The gig proceeds were originally mooted to go towards The Cluny, but after they secured independent funding, the money went to Bobby Robson's cancer research foundation.

The band was subsequently announced to play at the Arctangent Festival later that year.

== Style and influences ==
Critics have categorised Yourcodenameis:milo's music as post-hardcore.

The band have cited influences including the Wedding Present, PJ Harvey, the Breeders, the Pixies, Nirvana, Big Black, Shellac, Mastodon, Regina Spektor, U2, Talking Heads, Red Hot Chili Peppers, Brian Eno, Iggy Pop, Underworld, Wu-Tang Clan, DJ Krush, DJ Shadow, and DJ Cam.

They have been cited as an influence by the 1975.

== Members ==
- Adam Hiles – guitar (2002–2007, 2020–present)
- Ross Harley – bass (2002–2007, 2020–present)
- Paul 'Bez' Gamble-Beresford – drums, percussion (2003–2006, 2020–present), guitar (2002–2003)
- Justin Lockey – guitar (2003–2007, 2020–present)
- Paul Mullen – vocals, guitar, synthesizer (2003–2007, 2020–present)

Former members

- Shaun Abbott – drums, percussion (2006–2007)

== Discography ==
All Roads to Fault

- Released: 12 May 2004
- Format: LP
- Label: Polydor Records
- Writer: Paul Mullen, Adam Hiles, Justin Lockey, Ross Harley, Paul Gamble-'Bez'-Beresford
- Producer: Steve Albini
- Singles: "I.Shoes", "All Roads to Fault", "The Problem"

Ignoto

- Released: 18 April 2005
- Format: LP
- Label: Polydor Records
- Writer: Paul Mullen, Adam Hiles, Justin Lockey, Ross Harley, Paul Gamble-'Bez'-Beresford
- Producer: Mark Ellis, yourcodenameis:milo
- Singles: "Schteeve", "Rapt. Dept.", "17"

Print Is Dead Vol 1

- Released: 6 November 2006
- Format: LP
- Label: V2 Records
- Writer: Paul Mullen, Adam Hiles, Justin Lockey, Ross Harley, Shaun Abbott, Alex Pennie, James Frost, Robin Hawkins, Iwan Griffiths, Gordon Moakes, Ross Millard, Tom Vek, Martin Grech, David Brewis, Peter Brewis, Andrew Moore, Jamie Lenman, Jon Pearce, Guy Davis, Lethal Bizzle, Samuel Lloyd Duckworth, Lukas Wooller, ULTRA BRAiN
- Producer: Yourcodenameis:milo
- Singles: "Wait a Minute"

They Came from the Sun

- Released: 2 April 2007
- Format: LP
- Label: V2 Records
- Writer: Paul Mullen, Adam Hiles, Justin Lockey, Ross Harley, Shaun Abbott
- Producer: Justin Lockey
- Singles: "Understand", "I'm Impressed"
