= Print Is Dead Vol 1 =

Studio album by Yourcodenameis:Milo
- Released: 6 November 2006
- Genre: Rock
- Length: 48:35
- Label: V2
- Producer: Yourcodenameis:Milo

Yourcodenameis:Milo chronology
Ignoto (2005)	Print Is Dead Vol 1 (2006)	They Came from the Sun (2007)

Professional ratings
Review scores
Source	Rating
Drowned in Sound	(7/10)
Time Out London	4/6 stars
Rocklouder	3/5 stars

Print Is Dead Vol 1 is the first side project album by Yourcodenameis:Milo. The album was released on 6 November 2006 via V2 Records. Each song on the album features Yourcodenameis:Milo collaborating with guests from current British bands.

An explanation of the album and its motivation is printed in the sleeve:

"We all used to make each other mix tapes when we were at school, or at least fill up the other side of a C90 with songs we knew other people hadn't heard. I guess that kind of stuck and we wanted to make our own. And we all remember how exciting it was to hear about people we admired collaborating with each other. We wanted in on that.

In the summer of 2005 we started emailing people asking if they wanted to come and be involved. All the tracks would have to be written and recorded within the space of one day at our Like a Cat, Like a Fox studio somewhere under a bridge, somewhere in Newcastle. All spur of the moment, no time to be precious but with a spirit of taking chances and doing things that none of us could get away with in our respective day jobs. People were up for it. So we did it. In the summer of 2006 it was finished.

We'll be starting Print is Dead Vol. 2. soon..." – Yourcodenameis:Milo (September 2006)

The band uploaded a new track every Tuesday to their Myspace page prior to the release. "Wait a Minute" (featuring Gordon Moakes of Bloc Party) was the first single released from the album. The album's name is taken from an Egon Spengler quote from the film Ghostbusters.

== Track listing ==
1. "Greetings" (featuring Hot Club De Paris) – 3:21
2. "Wait a Minute" (featuring Gordon Moakes of Bloc Party) – 3:46
3. "The Trapeze Artist" (featuring The Automatic) – 3:28
4. "I Remember the Summer Isles" (featuring Ross Millard of The Futureheads) – 6:18
5. "Roots/Branches" (featuring Tom Vek) – 3:13
6. "We Hope You Are What You Think You Are" (featuring Martin Grech) – 5:09
7. "Deborah Bow" (featuring Field Music) – 1:45
8. "Captain of Lies" (featuring Reuben) – 2:43
9. "Ordinary Day" (featuring Lethal Bizzle) – 3:37
10. "Tiny Vessels" (featuring Get Cape. Wear Cape. Fly) – 4:31
11. "Noah" (featuring Lukas Wooller of Maxïmo Park) – 7:47
12. "Plans for Everything" (featuring ULTRA BRAiN) – 2:51
