= The Automatic discography =

- Studio albums: 3
- Extended plays: 2
- Live albums: 1
- Singles: 7
- Music videos: 7

This is a complete list of releases from Welsh rock band The Automatic, including albums, extended plays, singles and music videos.

== Discography ==
=== Studio albums ===
Title	Album details	Peak chart positions				Certifications
Title	Album details	UK	UK Indie	EU	SCO	Certifications
Not Accepted Anywhere	Released: 19 June 2006; Label: B-Unique Records	3	—	10	7	BPI: Gold
This Is a Fix	Released: 25 August 2008; Label: B-Unique Records	44	—	—	68	
Tear the Signs Down	Released: 8 March 2010; Label: Armoured Records	—	31	—	—	
"—" denotes a title that did not chart, or was not released in that territory.

=== Singles ===
Single	Year	Peak chart positions							Certifications	Album
Single	Year	UK	AUS Hit.	BEL (FL) Tip	EU	IRL	NLD	SCO	Certifications	Album
"Recover"	2005	—	—	—	—	—	—	—		Not Accepted Anywhere
"Raoul"	2006	32	—	—	—	—	—	29		Not Accepted Anywhere
"Monster"	2006	4	18	14	13	37	83	7	BPI: Gold	Not Accepted Anywhere
"Recover" (re-release)	2006	25	—	—	—	—	—	11		Not Accepted Anywhere
"Raoul" (re-release)	2007	30	—	—	—	—	—	15		Not Accepted Anywhere
"Steve McQueen"	2008	16	—	—	—	—	—	4		This Is a Fix
"Interstate"	2009	—	—	—	—	—	—	—		Tear the Signs Down
"Run & Hide"	2010	—	—	—	—	—	—	—		Tear the Signs Down
"Cannot Be Saved"	2010	—	—	—	—	—	—	—		Tear the Signs Down
"—" denotes a title that did not chart, or was not released in that territory.

=== Demos ===
Studio

Demo

- Released: 2005
- Label: FF Vinyl Ltd
- Producer: Richard Jackson
- Tracks: "Rats" (demo) "Monster" (demo)

=== EPs ===
Studio

Raoul (EP)

- Released: 17 July 2006
- Label: B-Unique Records

So Nice Say It Twice EP

- Released: 2007
- Label: B-Unique Records

Live

Live at the 100 Club

- Released: 16 August 2006
- Label: iTunes/coke/B-Unique Records

=== DVD ===
'''NME Awards 2007''' (The bands from the 2007 Rock and Rave Tours The Automatic, The View, The Horrors, Mumm-Ra, Klaxons, CSS, The Sunshine Underground, New Young Pony Club)

- Released: 17 March 2007
- Format: "DVD"
- Label: NME
- Director: Tim Mattia
- Bonus tracks: Bobby Gillespie talks about Primal Scream, Behind the scenes at NME Awards 2007.

SXSW 2007 Live Performances (LONE STAR LOUNGE Marc Broussard, Rachel Fuller with Pete Townshend, Rocco DeLuca, Annuals, Razorlight, Mando Diao, Lee "Scratch" Perry, Stars of Track and Field, Kraak & Smaak, Joe Purdy. THE BAT BAR The Bravery, Peter Bjorn & John, Ozomatli, The Automatic Automatic, Aqualung, Rickie Lee Jones, Bowling For Soup, Polyphonic Spree)

- Released: 21 August 2007
- Format: DVD
- Label: Shout Factory
- Chart position: 1

=== Covers ===
Song	Album
"Gold Digger (Kanye West) (Lead vocals Alex Pennie)"	Raoul/Not Accepted Anywhere (iTunes)
"Life During Wartime (Live) (Talking Heads) (Lead vocals Alex Pennie)"	Radio 1 NME Tour
"Epic (Faith No More) (Lead vocals Alex Pennie)"	Higher Voltage!: Another Brief History of Rock
"Grounds For Divorce (Elbow)"	XFM Live Session
"Love In This Club (Usher)"	Radio 1 Live Lounge
"She Wolf"

=== Remixes ===
Song	Album
"Monster (Fatboy Slim Remix)"	Monster
"Monster" (Zombie Dogs Remix)"	Monster
"Monster (Trey Prefontaine Mix)"	Monster
"Monster (Culprit 1 Remix)"	Monster
"Recover (Culprit 1 Remix)"	Recover

=== Live releases ===
Song	Recorded at	Appears on
"Monster"	The Electric Ballroom, 2006	Not Accepted Anywhere, iTunes exclusive
"That's What She Said"	100 Club, 2006	Live at the 100 Club
"On The Campaign Trail"	100 Club, 2006	Live at the 100 Club
"Raoul"	100 Club, 2006	Live at the 100 Club
"Team Drama"	100 Club, 2006	Live at the 100 Club
"By My Side"	100 Club, 2006	Live at the 100 Club
"Recover"	Leeds	Recover, 7digital exclusive
"That's What She Said"	The Electric Ballroom, 2006	Recover CD#2
"This Is A Fix"	Cardiff Point	Rock Sound magazine exclusive
"Steve McQueen"	Cardiff Point	Steve McQueen CD single
"Run and Hide into Raoul"	Oxford Academy	Twitter exclusive
"Sleepwalking"	Oxford Academy	TBA
"Magazines"	Oxford Academy	TBA
