= Not Accepted Anywhere album tour =

2005–07 concert tour by the Automatic

- Tour by The Automatic
- Location: Europe; North America; Japan
- Associated album: Not Accepted Anywhere
- Start date: October 14, 2005
- End date: August 26, 2007

The Automatic concert chronology
- Not Accepted Anywhere album tour (2005–07); This Is a Fix album tour (2008)

The Not Accepted Anywhere album tour was the touring period from 2005 through to 2007 when Welsh rock-band the Automatic promoted their debut album Not Accepted Anywhere. Over the three-year period, the band covered the United Kingdom several times, as well as touring in the United States, Japan, France and the Netherlands.

The band began touring as an opening act for bands such as Goldie Lookin Chain, Kaiser Chiefs, The Kooks, The Ordinary Boys and Hard Fi in 2005 and early 2006 before appearing third on the bill for the NME 2006 New Music Tour and then going on to perform at festivals such as Reading and Leeds, Oxegen, Camden Crawl, Glastonbury, South by Southwest and Warped tour, amongst others.

On tour the band were supported most notably by friends Viva Machine on almost all UK tours, and by Frank Turner, who had just begun as a solo artist – with the Automatic being fans of his former band Million Dead.

== Background ==
=== Support shows ===
In October through to November 2005 the band supported Goldie Lookin Chain on their UK tour, this tour supported the band's release of debut single "Recover ". This tour was followed by an intense period in the studio recording their debut album, heading back out in January to support The Kooks on their Inside In/Inside Out tour.

Later in 2006 the band also supported Kaiser Chiefs at their performances at the Millennium Square in Leeds, and well as supporting The Ordinary Boys in March. Cancelled supporting appearances included Kaiser Chiefs European tour in November 2006, and My Chemical Romance's The Black Parade World Tour in 2007.

During the band's headline of the NME Indie Rock 2007 Tour the Automatic let The View take the headline position at Carling Academy in their native Glasgow.

== Design and set-up ==
From 2006 onwards – when the band were headlining more and more performances, they began using various backdrops – ranging from simple sheet banners, to the more extravagant video screens. The artwork used was all based around designs made by Dean 'D*Face' Stockton for the album Not Accepted Anywhere, and the singles "Raoul", "Recover" and "Monster", many of these were then animated for performances – such as their 2006 London Forum performance where they used three giant screens, incorporating animations with a live feed of the band performing. In 2007 Rock Drops recreated D*Face's Raoul 'Globe' artwork from the re-release of the single – and used throughout tour and festival appearances by the band as a stage banner.

Alex Pennie was often noted by critics for being the band's energetic showman. On the NME 2007 tour Alex Pennie's stage antics lead to a fans classes getting broken, followed by wrestling a member of the audience who started smoking on stage on the Irish leg of the tour. Pennie whilst playing at New York's' Bowery Ballroom in July broke his ankle half way through the set, after one of his jumps went wrong – and sat out several songs until "Gold Digger" when he rejoined his band mates for the remainder of the set.

On several occasions the band's cover of Kanye West's "Gold Digger" would involve other musicians and guests, with primary vocalist and bassist Rob playing flute, Jamie Allen; one of the band's technicians would take over bass guitar, whilst Alex Pennie and James Frost split vocals. At Reading and Leeds festivals in 2006 Goldie Lookin Chain joined the band onstage for the track, whilst Viva Machine joined the band onstage wrapped in bandages in ULU, London in July 2006, and on Warped Tour 2007 Newton Faulkner sung and played guitar on the track. On the closing show of the 2007 NME Indie Rock Tour the band's tour manager Mike Doyle sung vocals on the band's cover of Talking Heads song "Life During Wartime".

Throughout the tour the band requested as part of their rider that venues put together a David Hasselhoff shrine, by October 2006 the band revealed this had been fulfilled by upwards of 20 venues.

== Concert broadcasts and coverage ==
BBC 6 Music's Steve Lamacq covered the band's opening night too their October 2006 leg of the album tour – in Exeter's Lemon Grove. Originally the entire 14 song set was broadcast with 7 songs made available on BBC Online afterwards. The BBC also covered The Automatic at Reading and Leeds Festivals with broadcasts of "Monster" and "Gold Digger" with Goldie Lookin Chain from the Radio 1/NME Tent. A year later at Glastonbury Festival 2007 BBC Three and BBC Online screened much of the band's set.

MTV featured performances of the band at Oxegen 2006, including "Recover" and "Monster", whilst Channel 4 broadcast performances of "Raoul", "Recover" and "Monster" from T4 on the Beach 2006. At South by Southwest in Austin, Texas the band's entire set was filmed by Blaze TV, and later broadcast on Crackle, with "Monster" being made part of the 2007 SXSW DVD.

=== GMTV Incident and aftermath ===
We didn’t really wanna be there because we thought we had been tricked into it and it wasn’t really our thing."

— The Automatic on GMTV

On July 21, 2006 the band made an appearance on GMTV – ITV's breakfast program. The band had been told that they would be playing a track on a morning show "not GMTV, it's something on just after it". With a performance the night before at Bristol's Carling Academy, members of the band decided to stay up all night drinking, until the 6:00 am start at GMTV. The band went on live at around 9:00 am, miming their single "Monster" as GMTV were unwilling for the band to perform live. The performance went on to involve guitarist Frost smashing his rented guitar repeatedly onto the floor, before jumping into the drum kit, whilst Pennie walked around with his Alesis Micron keyboard, taking off his trousers and eventually ending up on the floor with Frost, whilst Rob and Iwan continued to mime along to the backing track. During the performance an ITV cameraman received an injury when Frost was destroying his equipment, the cameraman reportedly threatened to sue the band, but later decided not to – saying he was simply pissed off at the time.

A month before the GMTV incident the band also were forced to mime on Channel 4's T4 on the Beach 2006, which they were unhappy about doing – stating prior to playing "Will we go on drunk? Let's just say there will be some interesting dancing going on as we aren't allowed to plug in our instruments."

== Personnel ==
Musicians

- Robin Hawkins – bass guitar, flute, vocals
- Alex Pennie – synthesizer, percussion, vocals
- James Frost – guitar, vocals
- Iwan Griffiths – drums

Additional musicians

- Jamie Allen – bass guitar during "Gold Digger"

Guest musicians

- Goldie Lookin Chain – guest vocals on "Gold Digger" at Reading and Leeds festivals 2006
- Newton Faulkner – guest vocals and guitar on "Gold Digger" on Vans warped tour 2007
- Mike Doyle – guest vocals on "Life During Wartime", NME Indie Rock Tour 2007
- Adequate Seven – guest vocals on "Gold Digger" at the Newquay Boardmasters Festival in 2006
- Capdown – guest vocals on "Gold Digger" at the Newquay Boardmasters Festival in 2006
- Mystery Jets – guest vocals on "Gold Digger" at the Newquay Boardmasters Festival in 2006
- Get Cape, Wear Cape, Fly – guest vocals and guitar on "Gold Digger" at the Newquay Boardmasters Festival in 2006

Crew

- Stan Saunders – sound
- Jamie Allen – engineer
- Mike Doyle – tour manager
- Darren Lovell – lighting
- Peter Hill – engineer/photography
- James "Jizz" Lawrenson – sound mixer

== Reception ==
During their Not Accepted Anywhere tour the band were noted for their energetic live performances, particularly the antics of keyboardist Alex Pennie, whose performances would involve running around the stage with a Cow bell, strangling himself with a microphone, climbing on-top of amps and speakers

there's no shortage of energy expended onstage in an attempt to jump-start the party. White-drainpiped Pennie is the star, jabbing at his keyboard, pummelling a cowbell or strangling himself with a mic lead, eyes rolled back in his head and tongue lolling like a madman. His partner in crime is guitarist Frost, who jerks violently on the spot like his foot's caught in a high-voltage electric fence. – Sam Richards, NME

Similarly Robin Monheit of Spin Magazine reviewing the band's New York show in July 2007 wrote "the Bowery Ballroom might not have been packed for last night's Automatic Automatic show, but synth-player/vocalist Alex Pennie performed as if it most definitely was" praising the band's energy. "...Pennie, is a sort of wee-sized caged animal, combining his fidgety keyboard fiddling with the most intense punk roars I've heard since At The Drive-In. Throughout the gig, he will run directly into the crowd, shove any and all fans in his way..." wrote themusicslut.com of the band's performance in New York in March 2007

Critics of the band's live sets were often quick to point out that single "Monster" was best received by audiences at live shows

== Set list ==
With only one album out, the set lists were composed almost entirely of the album's 12 tracks, although on occasion some of the album's b-sides were performed, including "Time = Money" on the October leg of the 2006 tour whilst in mid-2006 the band began covering Kanye West's track "Gold Digger" this was eventually accompanied with a cover of Talking Heads track "Life During Wartime". It wasn't until 2007 that the band began including new songs in their set list, "Steve McQueen" and "Revolution" (later retitled "Secret Police") were first performed on the "ShockWaves NME Indie Rock Tour", originally intended for a new single soon after the tour, but ultimately released on This Is A Fix over a year later.

From Not Accepted Anywhere

- "That's What She Said"
- "Raoul"
- "You Shout"
- "Recover"
- "Monster"
- "Lost at Home"
- "Keep Your Eyes Peeled"
- "Seriously... I Hate You Guys"
- "On The Campaign Trail"
- "Team Drama"
- "By My Side"
- "Rats"

From This Is A Fix

- "Steve McQueen"
- "Revolution"

B-sides

- "Time = Money"
- "Jack Daniels"

Covers

- "Gold Digger" originally by Kanye West
- "Life During Wartime" originally by Talking Heads

Northampton, Soundhaus, January 23, 2006

1. "Keep Your Eyes Peeled"
2. "Raoul"
3. "Rats"
4. "On The Campaign Trail"
5. "Team Drama"
6. "Lost at Home"
7. "That's What She Said"
8. "Recover"
9. "Monster"
London, 100 Club, August 9, 2006

1. "Keep Your Eyes Peeled"
2. "On the Campaign Trail"
3. "Seriously I Hate You Guys"
4. "Raoul"
5. "Team Drama"
6. "Jack Daniels"
7. "Lost at Home"
8. " You Shout You Shout You Shout"
9. "That's What She Said"
10. "By My Side"
11. "Monster"
12. "Gold Digger" (Kanye West cover)
13. "Recover"
London, Astoria, October 19, 2006

1. "Easy Target"
2. "Keep Your Eyes Peeled"
3. "Raoul"
4. "Time = Money"
5. "Team Drama"
6. "On The Campaign Trail"
7. "Rats"
8. "Seriously I Hate You Guys"
9. "Monster"
10. "By My Side"
11. "Gold Digger"
12. "You Shout You Shout You Shout"
13. "That's What She Said"
14. "Lost at Home"
15. "Recover"
Cologne, January 23, 2007

1. "Keep Your Eyes Peeled"
2. "Raoul"
3. "On The Campaign Trail"
4. "Life During Wartime"
5. "Team Drama"
6. "Revolution"
7. "Monster"
8. "By My Side"
9. "Steve McQueen"
10. "Seriously... I Hate You Guys"
11. "You Shout"
12. "That's What She Said"
13. "Gold Digger" (Kanye West cover)
14. "Recover"
Nottingham, Rock City, February 14, 2007

1. "By My Side"
2. "Raoul"
3. "On The Campaign Trail"
4. "Seriously...I Hate You Guys"
5. "Steve McQueen"
6. "Keep Your Eyes Peeled"
7. "Lost at Home"
8. "Monster"
9. "Life During Wartime"
10. "You Shout"
11. "That's What She Said"
12. "Recover"
SXSW, Emo's, March 15, 2007

1. "By My Side"
2. "Raoul"
3. "On The Campaign Trail"
4. "Seriously... I Hate You Guys"
5. "Monster"
6. "You Shout"
7. "That's What She Said"
8. "Recover"
New York, Pianos, March 19, 2007

1. "By My Side"
2. "Raoul"
3. "On the Campaign Trail"
4. "Seriously... I Hate You Guys"
5. "Monster"
6. "Gold Digger" (Kanye West cover)
7. "You Shout You Shout You Shout"
8. "That's What She Said"
9. "Recover"
Balélec-Festival, May 25, 2007

1. "By My Side"
2. "Raoul"
3. "On The Campaign Trail"
4. "Seriously... I Hate You Guys"
5. "Life During Wartime"
6. "Lost at Home"
7. "Monster"
8. "Keep Your Eyes Peeled"
9. "Team Drama"
10. "You Shout"
11. "That's What She Said"
12. "Gold Digger" (Kanye West cover)
13. "Recover"
Boston, Great Scotts, July 30, 2007

1. "Keep Your Eyes Peeled"
2. "On The Campaign Trail"
3. "Raoul"
4. "Seriously... I Hate You Guys"
5. "By My Side"
6. "Lost at Home"
7. "Monster"
8. "Gold Digger" (Kanye West cover)
9. "You Shout"
10. "That's What She Said"
11. "Recover"

== Tour dates ==
Date	City	Country	Venue	Support act(s)
Goldie Lookin Chain Tour (October–November 2005)
October 14, 2005	Manchester	England	Manchester Academy	Goldie Lookin Chain (headline)
October 15, 2005	Liverpool	England	Carling Academy	Goldie Lookin Chain (headline)
October 16, 2005	Bristol	England	Carling Academy	Goldie Lookin Chain (headline)
October 17, 2005	Cardiff	Wales	Cardiff University	Goldie Lookin Chain (headline)
October 19, 2005	Southampton	England	Southampton University	Goldie Lookin Chain (headline)
October 20, 2005	Norwich	England	UEA	Goldie Lookin Chain (headline)
October 21, 2005	Kingston upon Hull	England	Hull University	Goldie Lookin Chain (headline)
October 23, 2005	Aberdeen	Scotland	Moshulu	Goldie Lookin Chain (headline)
October 24, 2005	Glasgow	Scotland	The Garage	Goldie Lookin Chain (headline)
October 25, 2005	Edinburgh	Scotland	The Liquid Rooms	Goldie Lookin Chain (headline)
October 26, 2005	Newcastle upon Tyne	England	Newcastle University Union	Goldie Lookin Chain (headline)
October 28, 2005	Leeds	England	Irish Centre	Goldie Lookin Chain (headline)
October 29, 2005	Liverpool	England	Carling Academy	Goldie Lookin Chain (headline)
October 30, 2005	Manchester	England	Manchester University	Goldie Lookin Chain (headline)
October 31, 2005	Wolverhampton	England	Little Civic	Goldie Lookin Chain (headline)
November 1, 2005	Norwich	England	UEA	Hard Fi
November 2, 2005	Cambridge	England	The Junction	Hard Fi
November 3, 2005	Brighton	England	Concorde 2	
November 4, 2005	Chester	England	Telford's Warehouse	
November 9, 2005	London	England	Barfly	
November 21, 2005	Blackwood	Wales	Miners Institute	
November 22, 2005	Swansea	Wales	Patti Pavilion	
November 23, 2005	Bangor	Wales	Bangor University	
November 24, 2005	Aberystwyth	Wales	Aberystwyth University	
November 25, 2005	Bridgend	Wales	Recreation Centre	
November 26, 2005	Wrexham	Wales	Central Station	
November 27, 2005	Brecon	Wales	Market Hall	
The Kooks Tour (January–February 2006)
January 24, 2006	Southampton	England	Joiners Arms	The Kooks (headline)
January 25, 2006	Birmingham	England	Bar Academy	The Kooks (headline)
January 26, 2006	Cambridge	England	APU	The Kooks (headline)
January 27, 2006	Bristol	England	Louisiana	The Kooks (headline)
January 28, 2006	Tunbridge Wells	England	The Forum	The Kooks (headline)
January 30, 2006	Leeds	England	Cockpit	The Kooks (headline)
January 31, 2006	Nottingham	England	Social	The Kooks (headline)
February 1, 2006	Manchester	England	Academy	The Kooks (headline)
February 2, 2006	Sheffield	England	Fuzz Club	The Kooks (headline)
February 3, 2006	Newcastle	England	Academy	The Kooks (headline)
February 5, 2006	Edinburgh	Scotland	Venue	The Kooks (headline)
February 6, 2006	Glasgow	Scotland	King Tuts	The Kooks (headline)
February 7, 2006	Hull	England	Adelphi	The Kooks (headline)
February 8, 2006	Liverpool	England	Korova	The Kooks (headline)
February 10, 2006	Oxford	England	Zodiac	The Kooks (headline)
February 11, 2006	Norwich	England	Arts Centre	The Kooks (headline)
February 13, 2006	Brighton	England	Concorde 2	The Kooks (headline)
February 14, 2006	London	England	ULU	The Kooks (headline)
February 15, 2006	London	England	100 Club	The Kooks (headline)
Raoul tour (February–March 2006)
February 21, 2006	Peterborough	England	Met Lounge	The Marshals
February 22, 2006	Wrexham	Wales	Central Station	The Marshals
February 23, 2006	Sunderland	England	Pure	The Marshals
February 25, 2006	Aberdeen	Scotland	The Tunnels	The Marshals
February 26, 2006	Dundee	Scotland	Reading Rooms	The Marshals
February 27, 2006	York	England	Fibres	The Marshals
February 28, 2006	Stoke-on-Trent	England	Sugarmill	The Marshals
March 2, 2006	Swansea	Wales	Divas	The Marshals
March 3, 2006	Northampton	England	Soundhaus	The Marshals
March 4, 2006	Bedford	England	Esquires	The Marshals
March 5, 2006	Exeter	England	Cavern	The Marshals
March 7, 2006	Southend	England	Chinnerys	The Marshals
March 8, 2006	London	England	Barfly	The Marshals
March 9, 2006	Cardiff	Wales	Clwb Ifor Bach	The Marshals
Kaiser Chiefs headline (April 2006)
April 29, 2006	Leeds	England	Millennium Square	Kaiser Chiefs (headline)
April 30, 2006	Leeds	England	Millennium Square	Kaiser Chiefs (headline)
NME New Music Tour (May 2006)
May 6, 2006	Bristol	England	Bristol University	Boy Kill Boy ¡Forward, Russia! Howling Bells; The Long Blondes
May 7, 2006	Cardiff	Wales	Cardiff University	Boy Kill Boy ¡Forward, Russia! Howling Bells; The Long Blondes
May 8, 2006	Wolverhampton	England	Wulfrun	Boy Kill Boy ¡Forward, Russia! Howling Bells; The Long Blondes
May 10, 2006	Glasgow	Scotland	QMU	Boy Kill Boy ¡Forward, Russia! Howling Bells; The Long Blondes
May 11, 2006	Middlesbrough	England	Empire	Boy Kill Boy ¡Forward, Russia! Howling Bells; The Long Blondes
May 12, 2006	Manchester	England	Manchester University	Boy Kill Boy ¡Forward, Russia! Howling Bells; The Long Blondes
May 14, 2006	Portsmouth	England	Pyramids Centre	Boy Kill Boy ¡Forward, Russia! Howling Bells; The Long Blondes
May 15, 2006	Leicester	England	Leicester University	Boy Kill Boy ¡Forward, Russia! Howling Bells; The Long Blondes
May 16, 2006	Cambridge	Wales	Junction	Boy Kill Boy ¡Forward, Russia! Howling Bells; The Long Blondes
May 18, 2006	Norwich	England	UEA	Boy Kill Boy ¡Forward, Russia! Howling Bells; The Long Blondes
May 19, 2006	Sheffield	England	Leadmill	Boy Kill Boy ¡Forward, Russia! Howling Bells; The Long Blondes
May 20, 2006	Liverpool	England	Carling Academy	Boy Kill Boy ¡Forward, Russia! Howling Bells; The Long Blondes
May 23, 2006	Oxford	England	Brookes University	Boy Kill Boy ¡Forward, Russia! Howling Bells; The Long Blondes
May 24, 2006	London	England	Electric Ballroom	Boy Kill Boy ¡Forward, Russia! Howling Bells; The Long Blondes
Summer tour (June–August 2006)
May 31, 2006	Merthyr Tydfil	Wales	Studio Bar	Viva Machine
June 1, 2006	Cowbridge	Wales	Sports Centre	Viva Machine
June 2, 2006	Neath	Wales	Windsor Club	Viva Machine
June 3, 2006	Narberth	Wales	Queens Hall	Viva Machine
June 5, 2006	Brecon	Wales	Brycheiniog Theatre	Viva Machine
June 18, 2006	Weston-super-Mare	England	T4 on the Beach, Main Stage	Festival
July 8, 2006	County Kildare	Ireland	Oxegen, Punchestown Racecourse, Main Stage	Festival
July 9, 2006	Balado	Scotland	T in the Park, Futures Stage	Festival
July 11, 2006	Liverpool	England	Barfly	Cat the Dog; Viva Machine
July 12, 2006	Norwich	England	Waterfront	Cat the Dog; Viva Machine
July 13, 2006	London	England	University of London Union	Cat the Dog; Viva Machine
July 15, 2006	Abersoch	Wales	Wakestock	Festival
July 16, 2006	Oxford	England	Zodiac	Cat the Dog; Viva Machine
July 17, 2006	Birmingham	England	Carling Academy	Cat the Dog; Viva Machine
July 19, 2006	Brighton	England	Concorde 2	Cat the Dog; Viva Machine
July 20, 2006	Bristol	England	Carling Academy	Cat the Dog; Viva Machine
July 23, 2006	Cardiff	Wales	The Point	Cat the Dog; Viva Machine
July 28, 2006	Niigata Prefecture	Japan	Naeba Ski Resort, Fuji Rock Festival	Festival
August 4, 2006	Newquay	England	Rip Curl Boardmasters Unleashed '06	Festival
August 5, 2006	Cardiff	Wales	Cardiff big weekend	Festival
August 5, 2006	Canterbury	England	Electric Garden Festival	Festival
August 20, 2006	Huntingdon	England	Secret Garden Party	Festival
August 26, 2006	Reading Festival, Reading	England	Radio 1 Stage	Festival
August 27, 2006	Leeds Festival, Leeds	England	Radio 1 Stage	Festival
Album release tour (October–November 2006)
October 3, 2006	Exeter	England	Lemon Grove	Frank Turner; Mumm-Ra; Alterkicks; Viva Machine
October 4, 2006	Southampton	England	Southampton University	Frank Turner; Mumm-Ra; Alterkicks; Viva Machine
October 5, 2006	Loughborough	England	Loughborough University	Frank Turner; Mumm-Ra; Alterkicks; Viva Machine
October 7, 2006	Belfast	Northern Ireland	Mandela Hall	Frank Turner; Mumm-Ra; Alterkicks; Viva Machine
October 8, 2006	Dublin	Ireland	Temple Bar Music Centre	Frank Turner; Mumm-Ra; Alterkicks; Viva Machine
October 9, 2006	Glasgow	Scotland	ABC	Frank Turner; Mumm-Ra; Alterkicks; Viva Machine
October 10, 2006	Aberdeen	Scotland	Lemon Tree	Frank Turner; Mumm-Ra; Alterkicks; Viva Machine
October 12, 2006	Newcastle upon Tyne	England	Newcastle University	Frank Turner; Mumm-Ra; Alterkicks; Viva Machine
October 13, 2006	Kingston upon Hull	England	Hull University	Frank Turner; Mumm-Ra; Alterkicks; Viva Machine
October 14, 2006	Manchester	England	Manchester Academy 1	Frank Turner; Mumm-Ra; Alterkicks; Viva Machine
October 15, 2006	Leeds	England	Leeds University	Frank Turner; Mumm-Ra; Alterkicks; Viva Machine
October 17, 2006	Cambridge	England	Corn Exchange	Frank Turner; Mumm-Ra; Alterkicks; Viva Machine
October 18, 2006	Nottingham	England	Trent University	Frank Turner; Mumm-Ra; Alterkicks; Viva Machine
October 19, 2006	London	England	London Astoria	Frank Turner; Mumm-Ra; Alterkicks; Viva Machine
October 20, 2006	Sheffield	England	Sheffield Leadmill	Frank Turner; Mumm-Ra; Alterkicks; Viva Machine
October 22, 2006	Bristol	England	Carling Academy	Frank Turner; Mumm-Ra; Alterkicks; Viva Machine
October 23, 2006	Cardiff	Wales	Cardiff University	Frank Turner; Mumm-Ra; Alterkicks; Viva Machine
October 24, 2006	Brighton	England	Corn Exchange	Frank Turner; Mumm-Ra; Alterkicks; Viva Machine
October 26, 2006	Oxford	England	Brookes University	Frank Turner; Mumm-Ra; Alterkicks; Viva Machine
October 27, 2006	Bournemouth	England	Old Fire Station	Frank Turner; Mumm-Ra; Alterkicks; Viva Machine
October 28, 2006	Saint Helier	Jersey	Jersey Gloucester Hall	Frank Turner; Mumm-Ra; Alterkicks; Viva Machine
October 30, 2006	Brecon	Wales	Brecon Market Hall	Frank Turner; Mumm-Ra; Alterkicks; Viva Machine
October 31, 2006	Warwick	England	University of Warwick	Frank Turner; Mumm-Ra; Alterkicks; Viva Machine
November 1, 2006	Aberystwyth	Wales	Aberystwyth University	Frank Turner; Mumm-Ra; Alterkicks; Viva Machine
November 3, 2006	London	England	London Forum	Frank Turner; Mumm-Ra; Alterkicks; Viva Machine
European Dates (November 2006)
November 10, 2006	Paris	France	La Boule Noire	The Blood Arm
November 25, 2006	Amsterdam	Netherlands	Paradiso	London Calling Festival
January 23, 2007	Cologne	Germany	Prime Club	
NME Rock Tour (January–February 2007)
January 29, 2007	Belfast	Northern Ireland	Ulster Hall	Mumm-Ra; The Horrors; The View
January 30, 2007	Dublin	Ireland	Ambassador Theatre	Mumm-Ra; The Horrors; The View
February 1, 2007	Glasgow	Scotland	Carling Academy Glasgow	Mumm-Ra; The Horrors; The View
February 3, 2007	Manchester	England	Manchester Academy	Mumm-Ra; The Horrors; The View
February 6, 2007	Newcastle upon Tyne	England	Carling Academy Newcastle	Mumm-Ra; The Horrors; The View
February 7, 2007	Birmingham	England	Carling Academy Birmingham	Mumm-Ra; The Horrors; The View
February 8, 2007	Norwich	England	University of East Anglia	Mumm-Ra; The Horrors; The View
February 10, 2007	Cardiff	Wales	Cardiff University	Mumm-Ra; The View
February 11, 2007	Sheffield	England	Octagon Centre	Mumm-Ra; The View
February 12, 2007	Reading	England	The Hexagon	Mumm-Ra; The Horrors; The View
February 14, 2007	Nottingham	England	Nottingham Rock City	Mumm-Ra; The Horrors; The View
February 15, 2007	Liverpool	England	Liverpool University	Mumm-Ra; The Horrors; The View
February 16, 2007	Southampton	England	Guildhall	Mumm-Ra; The Horrors; The View
February 18, 2007	Cambridge	England	Cambridge Corn Exchange	Mumm-Ra; The Horrors; The View
February 19, 2007	Exeter	England	Exeter University	Mumm-Ra; The Horrors; The View
February 20, 2007	Bristol	England	Bristol Carling Academy	Mumm-Ra; The Horrors; The View
February 23, 2007	London	England	Brixton Academy	Mumm-Ra; The Horrors; The View
Summer festival circuit (March–June 2007)
March 17, 2007	Austin	United States	South by Southwest, SXSW Emo's	Festival
March 18, 2007	Austin	United States	South by Southwest, SXSW Bat Bar	Festival
March 19, 2007	New York City	United States	Pianos	
April 30, 2007	London	England	Give It A Name, Earls Court, Main Stage	Festival
May 25, 2007	Lausanne	Switzerland	Balélec Festival, Grande Scène	Festival
May 26, 2007	Pontypridd	Wales	The Full Ponty, Ynysangharad Park, Main Stage	Festival
June 10, 2007	Dores	Scotland	RockNess, Main Stage	Festival
June 22, 2007	Glastonbury	England	Glastonbury Festival, The Other Stage	Festival
Warped tour (June–July 2007)
June 29, 2007	Pomona	United States	Pomona Fairgrounds	Warped Tour
June 30, 2007	Ventura	United States	Seaside Park	Warped Tour
July 1, 2007	Mountain View	United States	Shoreline Amphitheatre	Warped Tour
July 3, 2007	Vancouver	Canada	Thunderbird Stadium	Warped Tour
July 5, 2007	Calgary	Canada	Race City Speedway	Warped Tour
July 7, 2007	Salt Lake City	United States	Utah State Fairgrounds	Warped Tour
July 8, 2007	Denver	United States	Invesco Field Mile High	Warped Tour
July 11, 2007	Phoenix	United States	Cricket Pavilion	Warped Tour
July 12, 2007	Las Cruces	United States	NMSU Practise Field	Warped Tour
July 18, 2007	Selma	United States	Verizon Wireless Amphitheater	Warped Tour
July 19, 2007	Jacksonville	United States	Reynolds Park Yacht Club	Warped Tour
July 15, 2007	Tampa	United States	Vinoy Park	Warped Tour
July 21, 2007	Miami	United States	Bicentennial Park	Warped Tour
July 22, 2007	Orlando	United States	Tinker Field	Warped Tour
July 23, 2007	Charlotte	United States	Verizon Amphitheatre	Warped Tour
July 24, 2007	Charlotte	United States	Verizon Amphitheatre	Warped Tour
USA/Canada headline tour (July–August 2007)
July 26, 2007	New York City	United States	Bowery Ballroom	Liam and Me; Mile High School; What A Great Audience; The Sterns; Various
July 27, 2007	Hartford	United States	Sweet Janes	Liam and Me; Mile High School; What A Great Audience; The Sterns; Various
July 28, 2007	Washington, D.C.	United States	Rock N Roll Hotel	Liam and Me; Mile High School; What A Great Audience; The Sterns; Various
July 30, 2007	Boston	United States	MA Great Scotts	Liam and Me; Mile High School; What A Great Audience; The Sterns; Various
July 31, 2007	Philadelphia	United States	Northstar	Liam and Me; Mile High School; What A Great Audience; The Sterns; Various
August 1, 2007	Toronto	Canada	Mod Club	Liam and Me; Mile High School; What A Great Audience; The Sterns; Various
August 3, 2007	Detroit	United States	MI Shelter	Liam and Me; Mile High School; What A Great Audience; The Sterns; Various
August 4, 2007	Chicago	United States	Subterranean	Liam and Me; Mile High School; What A Great Audience; The Sterns; Various
August 6, 2007	Charlotte	United States	Tremont Music Hall	Liam and Me; Mile High School; What A Great Audience; The Sterns; Various
August 7, 2007	Atlanta	United States	GA Vinyl	Liam and Me; Mile High School; What A Great Audience; The Sterns; Various
Get Loaded in the Park (August 2007)
August 26, 2007	London	England	Clapham Common, Main Stage	
