= Live at the 100 Club (EP) =

Live album (iTunes download) by The Automatic
- Released: 16 August 2006 (United Kingdom Digital EP Only)
- Genre: Post-punk revival Alternative rock Dance-punk
- Length: 13.33
- Label: iTunes; Coca-Cola; B-Unique Records; Polydor Records

The Automatic chronology
Raoul EP (2006)	Live at the 100 Club (2006)	This Is a Fix (2008)

Live at the 100 Club is the second EP from Welsh band The Automatic. The EP was recorded at London's 100 Club by Coca-Cola and iTunes and is available exclusively through iTunes. On the night the band also played a number of other songs including "Gold Digger" and "Recover".

== History ==
The initial 100 Club gig was pinned as the celebration gig for Coca-Cola's opening of their new website www.music.coca-cola.com, 300 fans were given the chance to go to the gig, through purchasing a ticket, and winning tickets through various competitions.

The iTunes EP originally contained 5 songs, however mysteriously That's what She Said disappeared from the EP sometime in early 2007.

iTunes and Coca-Cola launched a competition in conjunction with the 100 Club gig, for fans of The Automatic to win an iPod, signed posters, T-shirts, CDs and lanyards with free downloads for iTunes.

For a limited time Coca-Cola allowed iTunes users to download a single song from the EP for free by obtaining a code from Coca-Cola's music website.

== Track listing ==
=== Current ===
1. "On The Campaign Trail" – 2:57
2. "Raoul" – 3:46
3. "Team Drama" – 3:29
4. "By My Side" – 3:41

=== Original listing ===
1. "On The Campaign Trail" – 2:57
2. "Raoul" – 3:46
3. "Team Drama" – 3:29
4. "That's What She Said" -3:13
5. "By My Side" – 3:41
