= Raoul (EP) =

Raoul EP

EP by The Automatic
- Released: 17 July 2006 (Europe)
- Recorded: 2005–2006
- Genres: Post-punk revival Alternative rock
- Length: 25.50 (Europe)
- Label: B-Unique Records
- Producers: Steve Harris; Richard Jackson

The Automatic chronology
Not Accepted Anywhere (2006)	Raoul EP (2006)	Live at the 100 Club (2006)

Raoul EP is an 8-track EP by Welsh band The Automatic featuring the original versions of singles "Recover" and "Raoul", plus B-sides from the "Monster", "Raoul" and "Recover" singles. It was originally released for the European market, but has since been made available in the UK, making it more convenient for fans to get hold of the rarer tracks all on CD. Raoul is the owner of a sandwich shop in Cardiff, who would make the band's sandwiches.

== History ==
On 11 May 2006 a video for song "Song6" was uploaded to the band's MySpace after the song was featured on the "Recover" single earlier that year.

Many of the Raoul EP tracks are featured on the first three singles by the band; "Jack Daniels" is featured on the Recover CD, "Song6" on the Recover 7" vinyl, "On The Campaign Trail" is featured on both the "Raoul" single and the album Not Accepted Anywhere. "Trophy Wives" is also a b-side to "Raoul", "Night Drive" and "High Tide On Caroline Street" are both featured on the UK release of "Monster". The only b-sides from Not Accepted Anywhere which are not included on the EP are "Time=Money", which was released with "Recover", and "Easy Target" which was released with "Raoul".

== Track listing ==
Track Listing
No.	Title	Length
1.	"Recover"	2:53
2.	"Jack Daniels"	3:10
3.	"Song6"	3:28
4.	"Raoul"	3:54
5.	"On the Campaign Trail"	3:02
6.	"Trophy Wives"	1:57
7.	"Night Drive"	4:12
8.	"High Tide on Caroline Street"	2:54
