= Monster (The Automatic song) =

2006 single by the Automatic

Single by the Automatic

from the album Not Accepted Anywhere
- B-side: "Night Drive"; "High Tide on Caroline Street"
- Released: 5 June 2006
- Recorded: Stir (Cardiff, Wales)
- Length: 3:41
- Label: B-Unique; Polydor
- Songwriters: James Frost; Iwan Griffiths; Robin Hawkins; Alex Pennie
- Producer: Richard Jackson

The Automatic singles chronology
"Raoul" (2006)	"Monster" (2006)	"Recover" (re-release) (2006)

The Automatic North American chronology singles chronology
"Monster" (2007)	"Steve McQueen" (2008)

"Monster" is the third UK single by Welsh band the Automatic, taken from their debut album, Not Accepted Anywhere. The track was released on 5 June 2006 in the UK and subsequently reached No. 4 on the UK Singles Chart, becoming the band's highest-charting single there as of 2026. The band released the song in the United States under the alias of the Automatic Automatic on 14 May 2007.

== Composition ==
The track's music was composed by James Frost and Robin Hawkins, with the original incarnation featuring a different chorus, both musically and lyrically. However the band decided first to change the music before deciding to rewrite the chorus's lyrics. The chorus was planned to have a fairytale-esque theme to it, with keyboardist and vocalist Alex Pennie penning the idea which would become the track's famous lyric "What's that coming over the hill? Is it a monster? Is it a monster?". Originally however, the lyric was used just to fill the chorus until a more suitable lyric was found, but over time the lyric stuck and so was eventually used when the band recorded a demo of it in 2005.

Many of the lyrics used in "Monster" are metaphors for drug and drink intoxication; "brain fried tonight through misuse" and "without these pills you're let loose", with the chorus 'monster' lyric being a metaphor for the monster that comes out when people are intoxicated.

The original demo of "Monster" featured more prominent synthesizers, with some different vocals, including more gang vocals during the chorus and distorted backing vocals during the verses and bridge. The guitar, bass and drums however stayed relatively the same when in late 2005 they rerecorded the track for their album Not Accepted Anywhere. With the line-up change in 2007, seeing Paul Mullen join, "Monster" was reworked, with Paul providing a second guitar part, with almost all synthesizer parts removed. In addition, a new section was added to the bridge of "Monster", featuring a riff from Paul Mullen's band Yourcodenameis:milo track "All Roads to Fault".

== Release ==
A demo of the track was released in early 2005. The single release of "Monster" was announced in April 2006; the single would precede the band's debut album, which was also announced Not Accepted Anywhere. The single was released on 5 June 2006 as vinyl, CD, and digital formats featuring various remixes of "Monster" and the B-side from recording Not Accepted Anywhere, "Night Drive", which has rarely been performed live. The release of "Monster" was celebrated by a performance in Cardiff HMV on 5 June, with a series of HMV and Fopp instore performances over the following days. The American release of Monster came almost a year later on 14 May 2007; it was the band's only American single to-date, with their at the time American distributor Columbia Records not picking the band up in 2008 with Steve McQueen due to the record agreement between the band's main at-the-time label B-Unique Records, Polydor Records and subsequently Columbia Records. Universal Music Polska released "Monster" on 29 March 2011.

== Critical reception ==
"We wrote a song, it did really well, I don't really see what there is to be upset about. You get labelled "one hit wonders", but that's more hits than most people have. And it's not like we've disappeared without a trace. We've got a second album coming out, which in my opinion is full of much better songs. We wouldn't have been in a position to fly to LA to make a record if it wasn't for 'Monster'."

— Robin Hawkins

The band have not had a bigger hit from either Not Accepted Anywhere or This Is A Fix. The closest to reaching "Monster" was the 2008 single "Steve McQueen" which charted at No. 16 on the UK charts, considerably lower than predicted; however, this was due to several mistakes made by the band's label, who took an extra week to digitally release the track "Steve McQueen". Half of the band in 2005 believed that Not Accepted Anywhere track "Rats" would end up being a bigger hit than "Monster".

The track has received fairly mixed reviews, Dom Gourlay of Contact Music slated the pop track calling it "daft, irresponsible and unforgettably irritating" whilst Stephen Ackroyd of Click Music rated the track music higher, giving it 4/5. Drowned in Sound's Rachel Cawley gave the track 0 out of 10, attacking fans of the track saying; "If it was you who requested this to be played on the radio, you have my sympathy. Are you so stupefied that you find this ditchwater enthralling?" MusicOHM's Ryan Thomas reacted to the track far more positively, saying "Monster is an electrifying 3 minutes and 44 seconds of pop music at its finest" NME also praised the track "it's the catchiest indie hit of the summer, boasting a hook that could disembowel a whale" Gigwise.com however was not as positive, referring to previous singles "Recover" and "Raoul" saying "The Automatic's releases are getting progressively worse each time. Are they running out of good songs?"

== Chart performance ==
The track spent 16 weeks on the UK Singles Chart originally, with its highest charting position at No. 4. In 2007, when digital tracks began being counted in the UK Singles Chart, Monster re-entered the singles chart once more, at No. 34. With the self-release of third album Tear the Signs Down in 2010, the band revealed that Monster's success brought in a constant revenue to the band.

== Music video ==
The music video was produced and directed by Dominic Thompson-Talbot of production company Up the Resolution, who would go on to work with the band on their next singles "Raoul" and "Recover". The shoot took place in Black Park, London in 2006 and features Hadleigh Lomasney as 'big-foot'.

The video features the band playing monster hunters in false beards and hiking gear. They travel in an old ambulance draped with camouflage and newspaper articles that refer to monsters, UFOs and Nessie, and James Frost plays his guitar solo standing on top of the ambulance. The characters encounter Nessie and Big Foot but remain oblivious to their finds; when they return to the ambulance they are surrounded by monsters who are destroyed by a UFO, which then zaps the band as they exit the ambulance.

== Track listings ==
UK limited-edition 7-inch single
No.	Title	Length
1.	"Monster"	3:38
2.	"Monster" (Trey Prefontaine Mmix)

UK CD single
No.	Title	Length
1.	"Monster"	3:38
2.	"Night Drive"

UK and Australian CD single
No.	Title	Length
1.	"Monster"	3:38
2.	"High Tide on Caroline Street"
3.	"Monster" (Culprit One remix)
4.	"Monster" (video)

== Charts ==
=== Weekly charts ===
Chart (2006)	Peak position
Australia (AMR)	99
Australia (ARIA Hitseekers)	18
Belgium (Ultratip Bubbling Under Flanders)	14
Europe (Eurochart Hot 100)	13
Ireland (IRMA)	37
Netherlands (Single Top 100)	83
Scotland Singles (Official Charts)	6
UK Singles (Official Charts)	4

=== Year-end charts ===
Chart (2006)	Position
UK Singles (OCC)	21

== Certifications ==
Region	Certification	Certified units/sales
United Kingdom (BPI)	Gold	400,000^{‡}
^{‡} Sales+streaming figures based on certification alone.
