= That's What She Said =

That's What She Said may refer to:

- That's what she said, an exclamation exposing a double entendre
- That's What She Said (film), a 2012 American comedy film
- That's What She Said (EP), an EP by The Friday Night Boys
- "That's What She Said" (song), a song by The Automatic
- "That's What She Said", the tenth episode of the eighth season of King of the Hill

== See also ==
- That's What He Said (podcast), a podcast hosted by Greg James
