= That's What She Said (song) =

Song by The Automatic

from the album Not Accepted Anywhere
- Released: 19 June 2006 (UK); 22 June 2007 (US)
- Recorded: 2006
- Studio: Stir, Cardiff, Wales
- Genre: Pop-punk; alternative rock; electro; disco
- Length: 3:16
- Label: B-Unique
- Songwriter(s): James Frost; Iwan Griffiths; Robin Hawkins; Alex Pennie
- Producer(s): Steve Harris; Richard Jackson; Ian Broudie

"That's What She Said" is the lead track on Welsh band the Automatic's debut album Not Accepted Anywhere. The track was recorded in Stir Studio in Cardiff.

== Production ==
=== Meaning ===
The track drones of the unhappy day-to-day lives, waiting for the weekend to begin.

=== Release ===
The song itself was performed live for the first time at Cardiff club Barfly on New Year's Eve 2005.

On the "Recover" 2006 single, a recording from The Electric Ballroom in London of the track is featured as a B-side, where the song is played considerably faster live.

The track was featured on Kerrang!'s CD New Breed.

The song's most notable performances include Later... with Jools Holland where the band replaced Keane, and in the US during SXSW from the Bat Bar.

=== Musicians ===
- James Frost – guitar, backing vocals
- Robin Hawkins – lead vocals, bass guitar
- Iwan Griffiths – drums, percussion, vocals
- Alex Pennie – keyboards, vocals, synthesizers, backing percussion

== Performance ==
With the departure of Alex Pennie, Paul Mullen uses a microKORG during the verse, then in the chorus switches to guitar, Paul also uses a vocoder during many of the vocal parts of the song whilst Rob sings lead vocals during the verse, Frost during the pre-chorus and then Rob again during the chorus.
