= Steve McQueen (The Automatic song) =

Single by The Automatic

from the album This Is A Fix
- B-side: "Big Ideas", "In This World", "Young Entrepreneurs"
- Released: 18 August 2008
- Recorded: Sage and Sound Recording Studio, West Hollywood & Warwick Hall, Cardiff
- Genre: Alternative rock, post-punk revival
- Length: 3:44
- Label: Polydor, B-Unique
- Songwriters: James Frost; Iwan Griffiths; Robin Hawkins; Alex Pennie

The Automatic singles chronology
"Raoul" (2007)	"Steve McQueen" (2008)	"Interstate" (2009)

Alternative cover
- Radio promo artwork

Alternative cover
- 7" picture disc

"Steve McQueen" is the first and ultimately only single from Welsh rock band The Automatic's second album This Is A Fix. It is their fifth single overall. The track began radio and video play as of 7 July 2008 and was released on 18 August 2008.

The track premiered on the 2007 NME Indie Rock Tour, along with "Revolution" – which later would be titled "Secret Police", and was originally recorded over the final weeks of 2006 with original member of The Automatic – Alex Pennie, penned to be released in April 2007, the single was for unknown reasons scrapped until 2008 when it was re-recorded with Paul Mullen as a member of the band.

== Origins and recording ==
The track "Steve McQueen" was first mentioned in late 2006, after the release of the band's debut album Not Accepted Anywhere. "Steve McQueen", along with another track titled "Revolution" had been recorded over Christmas 2006 by Rob, Frost, Iwan and Pennie. The two tracks were to be released as a transition from Not Accepted Anywhere to their next studio album. "Steve McQueen" and "Revolution" were performed throughout NME 2007 Indie Rock Tour, with bootlegs of the track appearing on YouTube, however after this for an undisclosed reason the release was scrapped.

Not Accepted Anywhere was taken overseas to the United States, where it was promoted on the Vans Warped Tour, with "Steve McQueen" and "Revolution" subsequently being removed from the set list, up until Alex Pennie left the band on 18 September 2007. After which Yourcodenameis:milo vocalist and guitarist Paul Mullen joined the band, revamping "Steve McQueen", stripping away the synthesizer and screaming vocal parts and replacing them with a second guitar and harmonizing vocals

The track was re-recorded at Sage & Sound Recordings in Los Angeles, with producer Butch Walker assisted by Ryan Hewitt. Fellow musicians Frank Turner and Chris T-T also came to the session to provide extra percussion and vocals, along with vocals from Butch, Rob, Frost, Iwan and Paul.

== Composition ==
The lyrical content of the song has been noted to be a transitional song between albums Not Accepted Anywhere – which deals with the themes of growing up and the person experiences of the band, and This Is A Fix – which deals with larger stories. The title "Steve McQueen" is a reference to the 1963 film The Great Escape, starring actor Steve McQueen as a captured United States Army Air Force Officer; Captain Virgil Hilts, who tries to escape from a Stalag.

A lot of the themes of the first album were about growing up in a small town – because it's all we'd ever done with our lives, and Steve McQueen is the last of that, it puts it all to bed, it's about having left (Cowbridge) and then returning and just not feeling a part of the place and having moved on

— Rob Hawkins talking to BBC Radio 1's Jo Whiley

== Release ==
NME, Designer Magazine and a BBC radio interview with James Frost all sourced "Steve McQueen" for an April 2007 release, along with b-side "Revolution", both of which were recorded at Christmas 2006. This release was however dissolved for an unknown reason.

Over a year passed from its original intended release in April 2007, when eventually a re-recording – with Paul Mullen replacing Alex Pennie premiered on Zane Lowe's BBC Radio 1 show on 7 July 2008; moments later a clip of the track was added to the bands myspace and it was also announced that NME.com would be hosting the video premiere on 8 July. The track in its first week was added to Radio 1's C List and Greg James' record of the week.

The release was celebrated by an instore signing in Cardiff HMV, followed by a party and secret later on that evening in Cardiff; due to the record label's (Polydor/B-unique) stupidity the single was released a day late, on 19 August 2008.

=== Appearances in the media ===
The song has been acoustically performed for The Daily Telegraph, NME, BBC Music and The Fly, whilst also appearing live from the band on MTV Rocks' Gonzo on Tour 2008, Channel 4's T4 on the Beach 2008 and ITV's The Fashion Show.

The song was also used on the Channel 4 program 4music: V Festival 2008, Formula 1's official website for the highlight reel of the 2008 Italian Grand Prix and the soundtrack of Colin McRae: Dirt 2.

== Music video ==
The music video was filmed on 15 June 2008 in the Mojave Desert, California, the same location used for the music videos The Killers – Don't Shoot Me Santa and The All American Rejects – It Ends Tonight. Several pieces of the plane parts seen in the music video are pieces used in the opening episodes of television series LOST.

The video itself is set around a scrap yard (the Mojave Airport & Spaceport), with wreckages of planes and engines around a desert, opening with singer Rob Hawkins pushing a motorbike through the desert (A reference to McQueen's film The Great Escape) the video continues to show the band playing in the scrapyard as well as walking around it, and as the video progresses the band are put through a sand storm. The video was directed by Paul Minor, who has previously directed videos for Queens of The Stone Age.

== Reception ==
Fraser McAlpine of BBC Radio 1 chartblog gave the single 3/5 saying; "a muscular reworking of the band's trademark sound, only without the really trademark noise (Alex Pennies screams), which leaves them sounding a bit like just another rock band, but a million per cent less irritating than they used to" Alex Fletcher of Digital Spy wrote "With a beefed-up arsenal of guitars and a snarling, infectious chorus, 'Steve McQueen' is a brilliant slice of old fashioned rawk" giving it 4/5 Nicole Kenny of Manchester Evening News also gave the single 4/5 "In a nutshell Steve McQueen is a raucous rock song with a very addictive chorus that will get you singing along on the first hear of it" Sean Smith and James Davies of The Blackout praised the band in Rock Sound, saying "I like it, they've grown up. Its catchy", with James saying "Its a bit more chunky than their earlier stuff, well done, good effort."

=== Chart performance ===
"Steve McQueen" marked The Automatic's fourth appearance in the UK Top 40, peaking at #16 in the UK Singles Chart hence also making it their second UK Top 20 single. It dropped a place to #17 the following week, then to #29 in its third week and dropped out of the Top 40 altogether in its fourth week.

Chart	Week	Position
UK Singles Chart	24 August 2008	#16
UK Singles Chart	31 August 2008	#17
UK Singles Chart	7 September 2008	#29
UK Singles Chart	14 September 2008	#43

== Track listing ==
Original – unreleased
No.	Title	Length
1.	"Steve McQueen (Original version featuring Alex Pennie)"
2.	"Revolution (Original version featuring Alex Pennie)"

CD
No.	Title	Length
1.	"Steve McQueen"
2.	"In This World"

Vinyl#1
No.	Title	Length
1.	"Steve McQueen"
2.	"Big Ideas"

Vinyl#2
No.	Title	Length
1.	"Steve McQueen"
2.	"Young Entrepreneurs"

Digital Download
No.	Title	Length
1.	"Steve McQueen (Acoustic)"
2.	"Steve McQueen (Live)"

== Personnel ==
Production

- Butch Walker – producer, backing vocals, percussion
- Ryan Hewitt – engineer
- Stephen Harris – mixing
- Richard Jackson – mixing of b-sides "Young Entrepreneurs", "Big Ideas", "In This World"

Musicians

- Chris T-T – vocals, percussion
- Frank Turner – vocals, percussion
- Paul Mullen – vocals, guitar, synthesizer, percussion
- James Frost – vocals, guitar, synthesizer, percussion
- Robin Hawkins – lead vocals, bass guitar, percussion
- Iwan Griffiths – vocals, drums, percussion
- Alex Pennie – co-writer, synthesizers, vocals, percussion in original version

Artwork

- David Bailey – graphics, artwork
- Shaun Bloodworth – photography
