= Magazines (song) =

"Magazines" (also known as "Kings of Holey") is a track by Welsh rock band The Automatic on their second album This Is a Fix. The track was announced as their second single from This Is a Fix in late 2008; however, for unexplained reasons, the single and further release of material and promotion of the album ended in early 2009, with the band re-entering the studio to record their third album instead.

The track is notably sung primarily by Paul Mullen, with Rob Hawkins and James Frost providing backing vocals, Frost also provides synthesizer parts, as well as guitar.

== Writing ==
In an interview with the BBC guitarist James Frost spoke of the track "There's a track called Magazines that is totally different to anything we've ever done before, I think it could be a sign of what we might do on the next album. It's this kind of dirty, sexy thing" Rob added: "It's like hip-hop with singing really, isn't it." During the writing and recording process the track was known as "Kings of Holey".
