= Viva Machine (album) =

Studio album by Viva Machine
- Released: 15 June 2009
- Recorded: 2007–2008, Warwick Hall, Cardiff
- Genre: Alternative rock
- Label: Rocklouder Records
- Producer: Richard Jackson

Singles from Viva Machine
- 1. "Robotbodyrox" Released: 9 November 2008; 2. "Earthquakers and Loveshakers" Released: 8 June 2009

Viva Machine is the self-titled debut album by Welsh band Viva Machine, released worldwide on 15 June 2009.

== History ==
The album was completed in mid-2008, with the band recording 15 A-sides, which were then whittled down to the 10 tracks that have made the album. The first single from the album, "Robotbodyrox" was released on 9 November 2008. Rock Sound magazine included "Futuristic Dracula" as a track on its free CD in the 2008 Christmas edition. "Earthquakers and Loveshakers" will be released as a free download on 15 June. The album's track listing was revealed on Amazon.com music, along with 30 second samples of each of the tracks.

The album's second single "Earthquakers and Loveshakers", new official website, artwork, album track listing and 10 track previews were revealed on 5 May 2009; the music video for "Earthquakers and Loveshakers", also released on 5 May, was directed by Adam Linzey and produced and developed by New Treatment, the location used was a disused retirement home, as well as scenery created using green screening. It was also revealed that if fans signed up to the bands mailing list they would receive the single as a free download on 8 June as opposed to a week later on the album's release.

To complement the "Earthquakers and Loveshakers" promotional video, a 'making of' documentary was filmed on set by Richard Collins.

The album artwork and concept, an instructional manual/scrapbook for an 'imagined machine', was designed by Richard Collins and produced with Nicole Carter and Viva Machine.

== Reception ==
Professional ratings
Review scores
| Source | Rating |
|---|---|
| Rock Sound | 7/10 stars |
| DIY | 8/10 stars |
| The Line of Best Fit | 60% |
| The Tune | (C+) |

Toni-Michelle Spencer of DIY heavily praised the record, giving it 8/10 and stating "we fell in love with Viva Machine from the outset: absolutely glorious – truly a band worth keeping your eye on", Click Music's Dom Smith also rated the album highly, "let's face it, they have hooks that you can't resist and catchy lyrics you might not always understand, but that you certainly can't ignore. Believe the hype, Viva Machine are coming to rock your body right" giving it 4/5. Rock Sound magazine's Mike Haydock rated the album 7/10 "they sound hugely talented and chart-bound"

== Track listing ==
All tracks are written by Viva Machine.

Album Tracks
| No. | Title | Length |
|---|---|---|
| 1. | "Robotbodyrox" |
| 2. | "Go Johny, Go! Go! Go!" |
| 3. | "Earthquakers & Loveshakers" |
| 4. | "Oxygen" |
| 5. | "Death Star Trucker" |
| 6. | "Yo Ho" |
| 7. | "Here Comes The Speed Of Light" |
| 8. | "Supernova" |
| 9. | "A Futuristic Dracula" |
| 10. | "Mental State" |

B-Sides
| No. | Title | Length |
|---|---|---|
| 1. | "Mercenaries" |
| 2. | "Delirious" |
| 3. | "Hospital" |
| 4. | "Nothing is Impossible" |

Remixes
| No. | Title | Length |
|---|---|---|
| 1. | "Robotbodyrox (Mr. Michael Monster Remix) (Appears on the Robotbodyrox single)" |
| 2. | "Robotbodyrox (Acoustic) (Appears on the Robotbodyrox single)" |
