= This Is a Fix =

Studio album by The Automatic
- Released: UK 25 August 2008
- Recorded: Sage and Sound Recording Studio, West Hollywood & Warwick Hall, Cardiff
- Genres: Post-punk revival, alternative rock, post-hardcore
- Length: 43:42
- Labels: B-Unique Records, Polydor
- Producers: Butch Walker, Richard Jackson, Stephen Harris

The Automatic chronology
Live at the 100 Club (2006)	This Is a Fix (2008)	Tear the Signs Down (2010)

Singles from This Is a Fix
- 1. "Steve McQueen" Released: 18 August 2008

This Is a Fix is the second album by Wales-based band The Automatic. It was released on 25 August 2008. The band worked with producer Don Gilmore in Los Angeles, but were disappointed with these sessions, and instead worked with Butch Walker at Sage and Sound Recording in Los Angeles then back in Cardiff with Richard Jackson and London with Stephen Harris.

The Automatic began work in 2006 on the follow-up to previous album Not Accepted Anywhere, however after the departure of Alex Pennie and addition of Paul Mullen, the completed recordings of such songs as "Steve McQueen" and "Revolution" - which featured Pennie providing synths and vocals - were shelved and later re-recorded with Mullen. Writing took place sporadically - with songs originating from both before and after Mullen's joining.

The album spawned only one single "Steve McQueen", however "Magazines" and "Secret Police" were originally planned for release as singles. This Is A Fix leaked onto the internet a month before release, it was also hindered by online distribution issues - which saw both the single "Steve McQueen" and album get released late across sites such as iTunes and 7digital.

== Recording and production ==
=== Aborted 2006 Sessions ===
In late 2006 the band - consisting of Rob, Pennie, Frost and Iwan were reported to be preparing new material for their upcoming NME Indie Rock tour. In late December 2006 it was revealed that the band had been in the studio, and had recorded two new untitled songs which were intended for release after the NME tour as a single. This single, whilst fully recorded and ready to go, was for unknown reasons never released, however the songs featured were revealed to be "Steve McQueen" and "Revolution".

The atmosphere when we we're working with Don Gilmore wasn't too uptight or anything, but it felt a bit like clocking in and clocking out at the beginning and end of everyday, rather than this sort of fluid process, and Don was well into working with pro-tools and chopping everything up we're not particularly about that, we'd rather play something and press record and if you can't play it, you can't play it.

— Rob Hawkins on recording with Don Gilmore

=== Demoing & Aborted sessions with Don Gilmore ===
After touring extensively for the album Not Accepted Anywhere the band returned to the studio, and as of September 2007 had around 10 tracks in various stages of development. Keyboard and vocalist Alex Pennie then left the band in September 2007, with the band going on to report they would be heading to the US to work on their second album. A month after the departure of Alex Pennie in October 2007, former yourcodenameis:milo frontman Paul Mullen was revealed to be joining the band as a second guitarist, vocalist and synthesizer player. Having already written new material throughout the year such as "Steve McQueen", "Revolution", "Accessories" and "Hard Rock" the band continued writing and demoing material in Cardiff with producer Richard Jackson. Upon the first day of Paul Mullen practicing with the band in their Cardiff studio the band wrote "Paul Harris", later appearing on the album as "This Ship". On 4 November 2007 guitarist James Frost posted onto YouTube a studio video of the band recording, previewing such songs as "Magazines" and "In This World" in the demoing stage.

In January the band began recording in Los Angeles with Don Gilmore, working on some 17 different tracks, with Frost posting two further video updates onto YouTube of recording in LA, previewing new songs "Seven Eight", "Make The Mistakes", "Sleepwalking" amongst other tracks. Five weeks into recording, with the album close to completion, the band decided they were unhappy with the progression of the sessions, and ultimately stopped working with Gilmore.

=== Sessions with Butch Walker and Richard Jackson ===
After spending five of the allocated 8 weeks in Los Angeles with Gilmore, the band only had 3 weeks left, so it was decided that they would complete as much as possible with producer Butch Walker in LA, and then return to Cardiff and complete the album with producer Richard Jackson. With Walker the band recorded "Steve McQueen", "Magazines", "In The Mountains", "Bad Guy" and "Secret Police", in these sessions the band tried different techniques to how they had previously recorded, with Iwan recording cymbals separately to the rest of the kit. Walker, along with Chris T-T and Frank Turner recorded with the band on "Steve McQueen", providing gang vocals and extra percussion.

The band returned to Cardiff, recording "Responsible Citizen", "Accessories", "This Is A Fix", "Sleepwalking", "Make The Mistakes" and "Light Entertainment" with Richard Jackson at Warwick Halls of Sound in Cardiff, as well as recording "This Ship" at the Olympic Studios in London with producer Stephen Harris.

== Composition ==
Writing the second album was relatively easy! It was hard to stop. It had been over two years since we'd written Not Accepted Anywhere by the time we started writing for This Is A Fix, so we had a massive build-up of ideas. We'd spent years on the road, growing as musicians and as people too

— Rob Hawkins on writing This Is A Fix

It was revealed early on that the second album would be darker and heavier than the previous album, whilst still having a catchy pop element to it. With the first album the band had tried to stick to writing big chorus singles - which they felt had come out sounding quite similar, however with This Is A Fix the band let the tracks evolve without worrying about writing singles. This ultimately led to the band having far more potential singles than with Not Accepted Anywhere.

=== Lyrics and themes ===
This Is A Fix lyrically sticks to no particular sound or topic, the title itself is even left open to interpretation; "It could mean, a drugs fix, it could mean a solution to something, or a fix as in a set-up" Hawkins told the BBC in July 2008. There are however some recurring themes - although they were not intentional; espionage and being lied and manipulated to by the media and government appear frequently

Tracks which deal with deceptions, and specially target certain bodies include "Responsible Citizen" which addresses the government's policies on drinking, "Magazines" is written about the band's experiences with the press and how the media can manipulate its audience. "Accessories" similarly deals with the media - specifically the record industry. Title track "This Is A Fix" is loosely based around government war and the lies surrounding war, whilst "Secret Police" also talks of government lies and espionage. "In The Mountains" focuses on drug use and those who don't consider the consequences.

"Steve McQueen" wraps up themes from the first album - with the band's experience of growing up and returning to their home but no longer feeling a part of it. "Sleepwalking" is specifically about Jan Grzebski - a Polish man who awoke from his coma after 19 years in 2007 and the change that occurred while he was unconscious. Written after a party in Beverly Hills the band attended, they were asked by Barbara Broccoli - the daughter of Albert R. Broccoli, to come up with a James Bond theme tune. The song was written to oppose the convention of being about the films hero - 007, and instead concentrates on the bad guys - because the band felt they were more interesting than the good guy. In interview Frost also has noted they never intended to use the chorus because they though they were stupid, however eventually got used to them and forgot.

There’s a bit of an idea of something going on behind the scenes, like espionage or something like that. Bit of a war theme as well. Completely by accident, but it’s there. Kind of ties in with the album title, 'This Is a Fix'. There’s different layers of meaning to that as well. It could be a fix as in a repair, a fix as in a drug fix, something you need or a solution – there’s a lot of meanings to it. Frost: That all points to a few of the tracks, there’s one called 'Secret Police' and one called 'Bad Guy', which are tying in with the espionage thing, but then one about needing to enjoy yourself and get drunk once in a while and how everyone needs to do that’s another kind of fix, so that title is just from a line in the song, but it accidentally ties in with almost every other track

— James Frost & Rob Hawkins the themes of This Is A Fix

Many of the album's tracks changed titles throughout development - often when naming songs the band use wherever they are at the time, previous examples included "Raoul" - after the sandwich shop they visited whilst working on Not Accepted Anywhere and "High Tide on Caroline Street" - after the road in Cardiff. "Responsible Citizen" was originally titled "Hard Rock" after the Hard Rock Cafe, "Arjans" was a sandwich shop in Cardiff and was the working title for "In The Mountains", "Millennium Stadium" was the working title for "Sleepwalking" - this was because the band felt the song had a stadium rock feel to it. "Light Entertainment" was initially titled "Seven Eight" because of its time signature, "This Ship" was known as "Paul Harris" - the man responsible for signing the band to Polydor/B-Unique. "Secret Police" when performed in 2007 and during recording was titled "Revolution" - a reference to the lyrics.

=== Music and style ===
With the departure of Alex Pennie, who provided synthesizers and high pitched vocals on the band's debut, and the addition of Paul Mullen it was insisted by the band that Mullen would not be continuing what Pennie did on the first record. Instead Mullen would be providing additional guitar, along with vocals that would not be imitating Alex Pennie's vocal style. Mullen's addition lead to their being no set frontman, with Hawkins, Frost and Mullen splitting vocals as well as synthesizer parts.

On This Is A Fix, similarly to their debut, the band use a variety of synthesizers and keyboards - Roland Juno and Alesis Andromeda's were used purely in the studio, whilst the James Frost operated Alesis Micron and Paul Mullen operated MicroKORG appear both live and on studio recordings.

The way the drums were recorded was influenced by a technique used by Dave Grohl, where the cymbals are recorded separately to the rest of the kit. "Make The Mistakes" takes influence from a recording style of Kings of Leon, using echoing guitar effects. "Light Entertainment" uses a 7:8 time-signature.

"Work in progress" the song list in their studio with Don Gilmore, all of these mixes were discarded when the band switched to working with Butch Walker

== Artwork ==
The album's artwork, by design studio Kiosk, was revealed on 3 July 2008. According to Yorkshire newspaper The Star, the artwork was based around a double decker bus in a Meadowhall Centre car park, however the final artwork does not show this. Kiosk's creative director, David Bailey, points out that a double decker bus was only used for one of the images in the CD booklet. He goes on to describe the final artwork as '...a mixture of sci-fi sub/urban Britain and the presence of absence'. On the artwork for both the album itself and single "Steve McQueen" parts of the photographs have been deliberately obscured by black shapes. This stemmed from the idea of making people think about whether it is something that has been deliberately removed, or whether it's covering something up, tying in with the album's themes of media manipulation.

== Release ==
In various interviews in 2006 and 2007 the band stated they would be releasing a brand new, previously unheard single in early 2007 - after the re-release of "Raoul" that the band's record label had insisted on. This was to be a studio recording of "Steve McQueen", which would have possibly been accompanied by "Revolution" - both of which were recorded around Christmas 2006 with former band member Alex Pennie - before his departure in 2007. This single was never released, for unknown reasons.

The re-recording of "Steve McQueen", with Paul Mullen replacing Pennie, premiered on Zane Lowe's Radio 1 show on 7 July 2008, with the music video being released the day after. A clip of the track was also added to the band's MySpace. On 30 July 2008, title track "This Is A Fix" was released for free download via the band's website.

The album itself was originally intended for release in June 2008, however the band's label decided to move the release back to 25 August with the album being released the week after the Reading and Leeds Festival. Single "Steve McQueen" was released the week before the album, on 18 August 2008.

=== Album distribution issues ===
The album leaked onto the internet around a month prior to its official release. The 18 August 2008 release date of single "Steve McQueen" was affected when record labels B-Unique/Polydor failed to properly distribute the single, resulting in many online stores such as 7digital and iTunes not supplying the single. The issue was resolved by Wednesday of the same week. Similarly a week later with the album's release, online retailers and physical retailers were not stocking the record until Thursday of that week due to distribution mistakes made by the band's labels.

The poor distribution of This Is A Fix was among the reasons that the band choose to withdraw from their 5-album deal with B-Unique and Polydor. "Magazines" had been just announced as the second single from This Is A Fix when the band split from their labels, the single's release was ultimately dropped completely, although promo CD's of the track went out to the press.

=== Promotion ===
The band's first promotional run for the album came in March 2008, with a 21 date tour around the United Kingdom, playing at the country's smaller venues, taking Viva Machine along for all of the dates, and Canterbury for half of the tour. On the tour they played around 12 songs, both new and old. Notably "Light Entertainment" was the set opener on all 21 dates, with "Steve McQueen", "Secret Police", "Magazines", "This Is A Fix" and "This Ship" also played at almost all dates, the remainder of tracks from the album were usually played at different venues, so the set list would slightly change at almost all dates.

The band were offered a televised slot at T4 On The Beach 2008 after Cage the Elephant were forced to pulled out due to illness. The Automatic had to cancel a date at Midsomer Norton in order to soundcheck for the T4 event, which was given priority as it was televised.

The band performed at both Glastonbury Festival and Reading and Leeds Festivals. Their Glastonbury set was filmed but never televised, and despite performing on the main stage at Reading and Leeds, they were not filmed. At Glastonbury NME, XFM and The Telegraph all ran short videos, in the form of interviews and acoustic performances of "Steve McQueen". The band ran a radio tour of the United Kingdom promoting the new album, going to Xfm Scotland, Edinburgh, Alan Robson, Clyde 1, 1548 Forth 2, Newcastle's Magic 1152, 100-102 Century Radio, 96.2 The Revolution, Xfm Manchester, 106.3 Bridge FM, 96.4 The Wave, 102.1 Bay Radio (formally Swansea Bay Radio), 107.8 Radio Hampshire amongst others. In August 2008 Rock Sound magazine ran an interview with the band in talking about the upcoming release, and what to expect, Kerrang! magazine also included two articles on the band and the new album. In late 2008 with the album released, the band toured across the UK again twice, the first in September/October and the other in November. These tours were run with ULive, meaning that each gig would take place at a university in the UK.

=== Webisode series ===
Throughout the buildup and release of This Is A Fix, guitarist James Frost and touring photographer / technician Peter Hill recorded and released short webisodes following the Automatic's studio and touring antics. The first set of videos followed The Automatic in the studio - four webisodes were made, two in Cardiff and two in Los Angeles recording with Don Gilmore. The second set titled This Is A Fix webisodes covered the band's 2008 UK club tour promoting This Is A Fix, recording "Steve McQueen" with Frank Turner, Butch Walker and Chris T-T and recording an advertisement for Channel 4. The series led up to the album release and was ended with a 15-minute video feature digitally available with This Is A Fix, which like the webisodes followed the band prior to the album release.

== Critical response ==
This Is A Fix
Review scores
Source	Rating
Allmusic	link
BBC	positive link
Digital Spy	link
Drowned in Sound	(6/10) link
The Guardian	link
Hot Press	(1/5) link
Kerrang!	KKKK (4/5)
NME	(7/10) link
Rockmidgets.com	(3/5) link
Rock Sound	8/10

The record received a very mixed reaction from critics garnering a score of 47/100 at aggregator website Metacritic. Despite getting such varied reviews, the three main rock music publications in the UK, Kerrang, Rock Sound and NME, all praised the record. Al Fox of the BBC praised the album, saying "The album is absolutely dripping with new ideas: the band's willingness to try them for size and to drop anything that doesn't immediately seem to be working means that only the cream of a very good crop of songs has made it onto the disc". Drowned in Sound reviewer Mike Haydock was not as enthusiastic, stating; "This Is a Fix may be good enough to save their bacon, but only just", criticising some of Rob Hawkins lyrics in "Bad Guy" and "This Ship". Haydock however applauded the singles "Steve McQueen" and "Magazines", overall labelling the album as "a pleasant mess", giving it the score 6/10.

Trevor Baker of Rock Sound magazine also wrote highly of the album, giving it 8/10, saying "they appear to have gone into studio with the intention of making a record that doesn't let energy levels drop for even a second." Emma Johnston of Kerrang magazine praised the band's comeback; "The melodies are relentless, almost pop in places, thanks to an underlying disco groove, arty and complex elsewhere. Forget the summer of Monster. This is a band reborn, and better than any could predict".

Alex Lai of Contact Music stated "Casting their net further than would have been expected actually sees The Automatic producing their best results", positively speaking of the album, also writing "Certainly there is nothing here which will be anywhere near as prolific as "Monster" at uniting the masses, but that may be the trade that has to be made in order to establish themselves as a serious rock act - and this is a decent start to doing that."

The Guardian's Rob Fitzpatrick severely disliked the album, particularly the lyrical content, giving the record 1 out of 5. Reviewers also compared the record to the sounds of Ash and McFly with Metallica and Foo Fighter riffs.

== Personnel ==
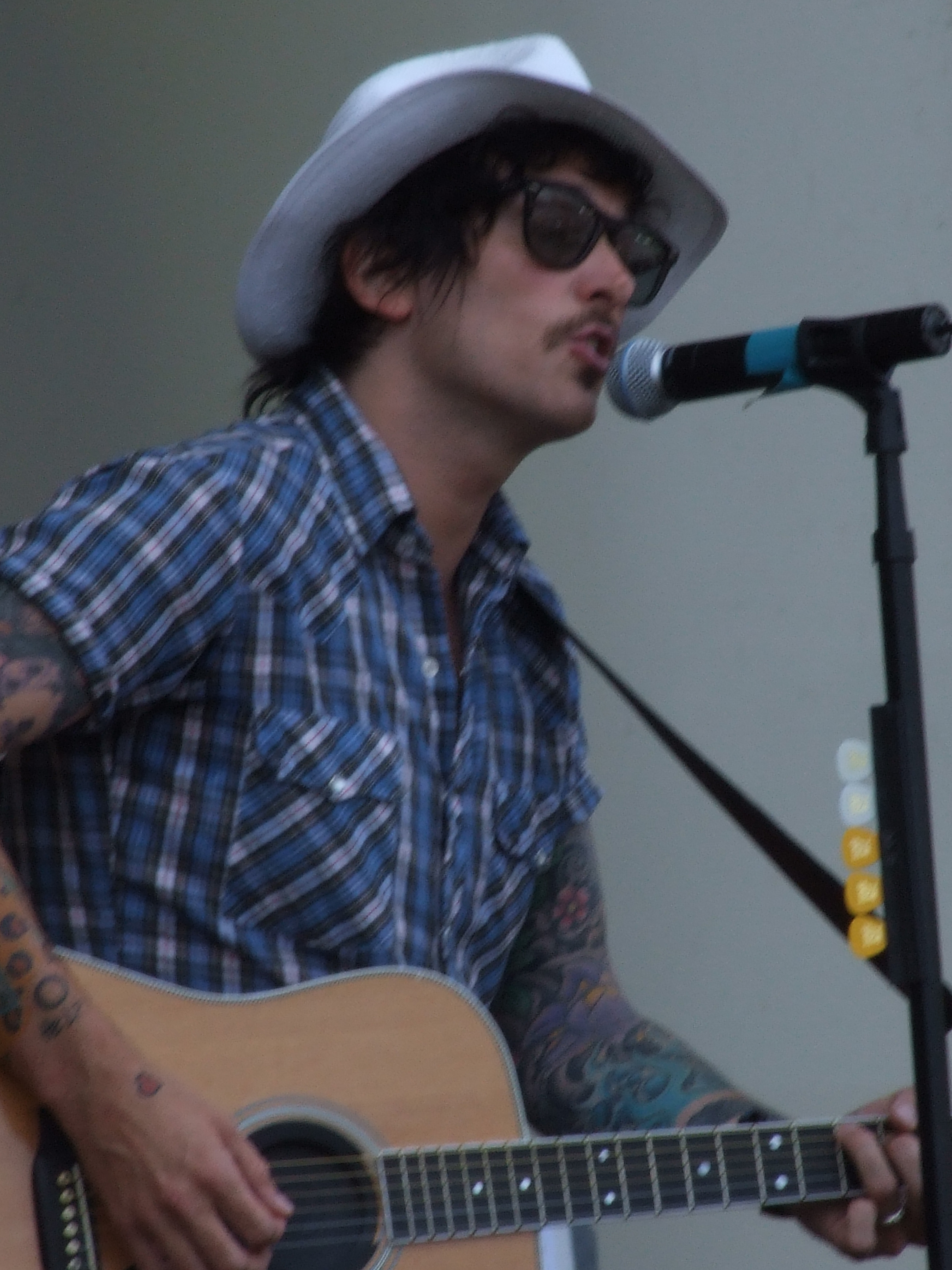
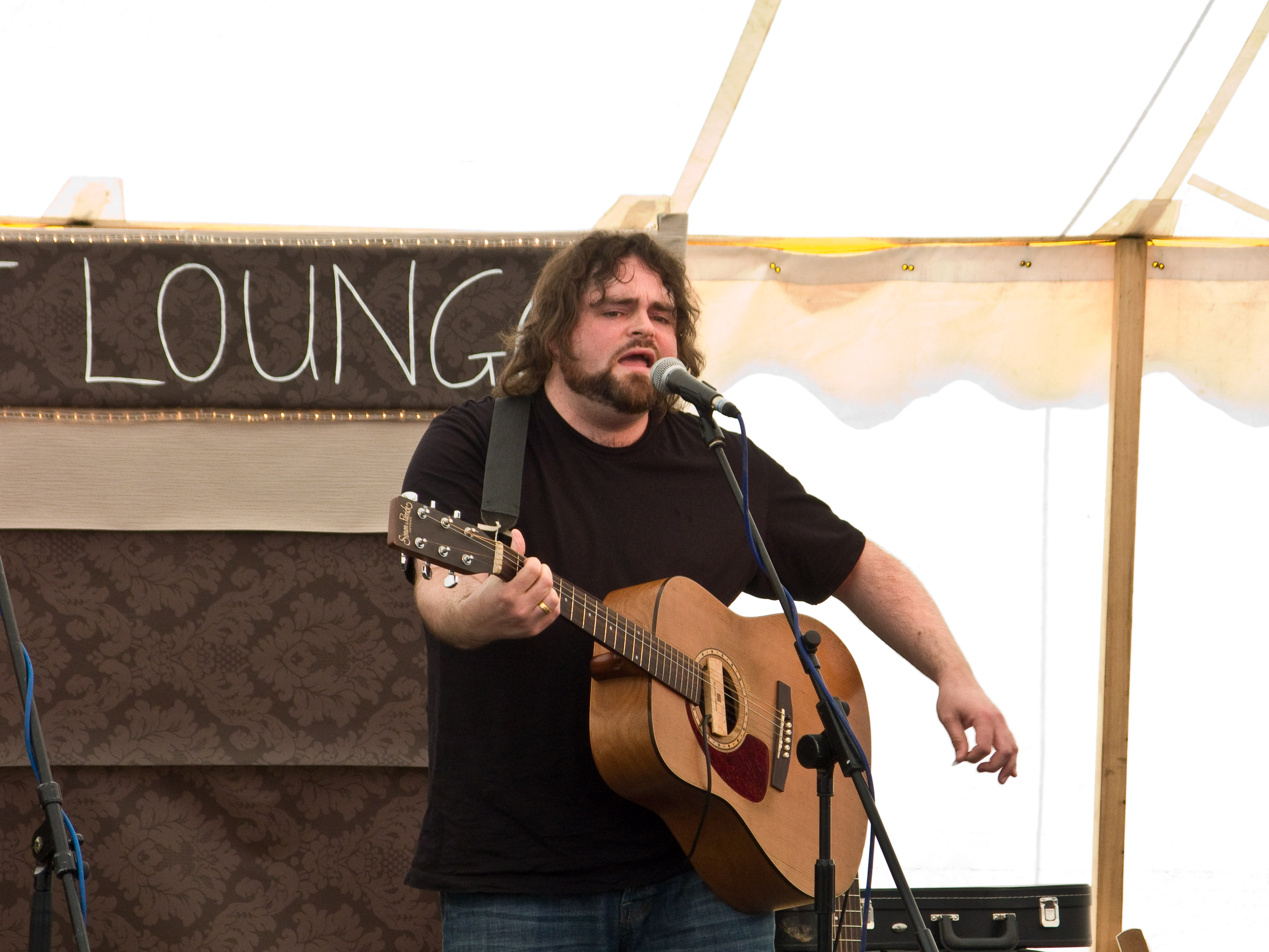
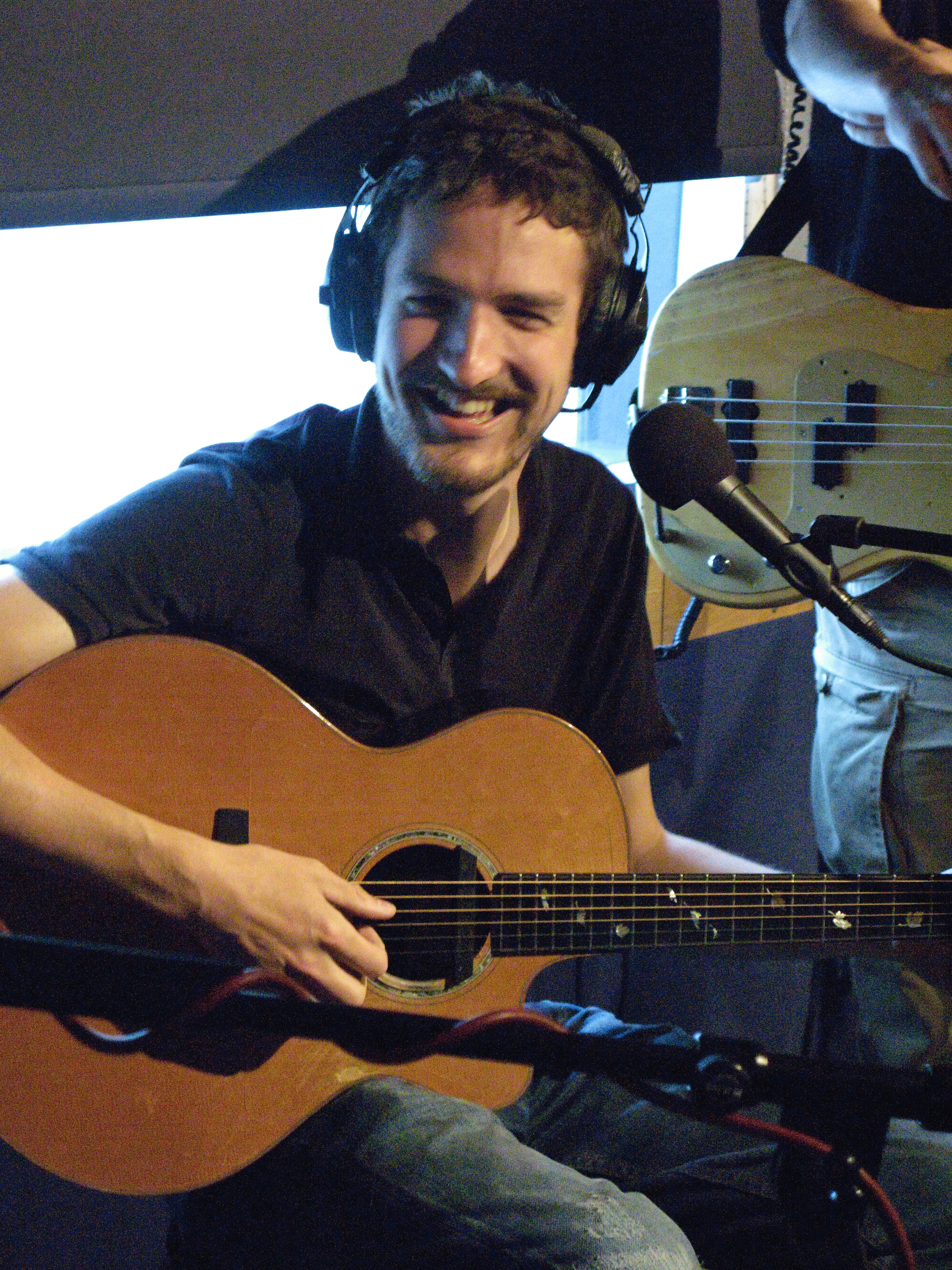
The record was produced by Butch Walker, musicians Chris T-T and Frank Turner also guest appear with producer Butch on the track Steve McQueen, providing gang vocals and extra percussion.

=== Musicians ===
- James Frost - guitar, backing vocals, synthesizers
- Paul Mullen - guitar, lead & backing vocals, synthesizers
- Robin Hawkins - lead & backing vocals, bass guitar, synthesizers
- Iwan Griffiths - drums & percussion

==== Other musicians ====
- Frank Turner - vocals, extra percussion
- Chris T-T - vocals, extra percussion
- Butch Walker - vocals, extra percussion

=== Production ===
"Steve McQueen", "Magazines", "In The Mountains", "Bad Guy" and "Secret Police" were produced in Los Angeles by Butch Walker.

"Responsible Citizen", "Accessories", "This Is A Fix", "Sleepwalking", "Make The Mistakes" and "Light Entertainment" were recorded in Cardiff's Warwick Hall studio by Richard Jackson.

"This Ship" was recorded at Olympic Studios in London and was produced by Stephen Harris.

- Butch Walker (Producer)
- Richard Jackson (Producer)
- Stephen Harris (Producer)
- John Davis (Master mixer)
- Ryan Hewitt (Engineer)
- Don Gilmore (Original producer)

== Track listing ==
This Is a Fix
No.	Title	Producer	Length
1.	"Responsible Citizen"	Richard Jackson	3:34
2.	"Steve McQueen"	Butch Walker	3:42
3.	"Accessories"	Jackson	3:59
4.	"Magazines"	Walker	3:19
5.	"This Ship"	Stephen Harris	4:31
6.	"In The Mountains"	Walker	3:45
7.	"This Is A Fix"	Jackson	3:03
8.	"Bad Guy"	Walker	3:45
9.	"Sleepwalking"	Jackson	3:41
10.	"Secret Police"	Walker	3:00
11.	"Make the Mistakes"	Jackson	4:05
12.	"Light Entertainment"	Jackson	3:33
Total length:			43.00

Bonus Tracks
No.	Title	Length
1.	"Steve McQueen (Acoustic)"	3:40
2.	"Steve McQueen (Live From Cardiff)"	3:37
3.	"Steve McQueen (Culpit 1 Remix)"	3:56

B-Sides
No.	Title	Length
1.	"In This World"	3:55
2.	"Big Ideas"	4:24
3.	"Young Entrepreneurs"	3:19
