= Stephen Harris (producer) =

English record producer

- Born: 1968 (age 57–58); Shifnal, England
- Genres: Rock, pop, alternative
- Occupations: Record producer, mixer
- Years active: 1985–present

Stephen Harris (born 1968 in Shifnal) is an English record producer, mixer, and audio engineer. He has worked with major rock and pop artists, including Dave Matthews Band, Ben Kweller, The Wombats, and Kaiser Chiefs.

== Early life and career ==
Stephen Harris was born in 1968 in Shifnal, Shropshire, England. He developed an early interest in music production and, at the age of 16, began his career as a tape operator at Zella Studios in Birmingham.

In the late 1980s, Harris joined the Slaughterhouse, a residential studio in Driffield, Yorkshire, where he further honed his engineering skills. His first notable success came through his work with the British rock band Little Angels on the track "Radical Your Lover," which reached number 28 on the UK charts.

== Selected discography ==
Harris has worked on work the albums and projects:

- Employment by Kaiser Chiefs
- A Guide to Love, Loss & Desperation by The Wombats
- Busted Stuff and Some Devil by Dave Matthews Band
- Sha Sha by Ben Kweller
- K by Kula Shaker
- Politics of Living by Kodaline
- Supernatural by Santana
- In a Perfect World and Coming Up for Air by Kodaline
- Not Accepted Anywhere and This Is a Fix by The Automatic
- The Sun Is Often Out by Longpigs
- Fast Times at Barrington High by The Academy Is...
