= Raoul (song) =

Single by The Automatic

from the album Not Accepted Anywhere
- B-side: "Trophy Wives"; "On The Camping Trail"; (re-release); "Gold Digger"; "Easy Target"
- Released: 27 March 2006 (original); 8 January 2007(re-release)
- Recorded: Elevator Studio, Liverpool
- Genre: Post-punk revival, alternative rock
- Length: 3:53 (original); 3:41(re-release)
- Label: B-Unique Records; Polydor Records
- Songwriters: James Frost; Iwan Griffiths; Robin Hawkins; Alex Pennie

The Automatic singles chronology
"Recover" (2006)	"Raoul" (2006)	"Monster" (2006)

Re-release singles chronology
"Recover (Re-release)" (2006)	""Raoul" (re-release)" (2007)	"Steve McQueen" (2008)

"Raoul" is a song by Welsh rock band The Automatic. It features on their first album Not Accepted Anywhere and was released as their second single on 27 March 2006. The song was later re-recorded and re-released as their fifth single on 8 January 2007.

== Composition ==
The song's lyrics deal with people's day-to-day lives – getting stuck in the same routines and casting aside ambitions. Raoul, a sandwich shop owner in Cardiff, was where the band went during days spent in their studio to get away from this drill. The vocals on Raoul were originally split three ways between Robin Hawkins (lead), Alex Pennie (shouts over the top) and James Frost (joint lead in the second verse and backing in the choruses). After Pennie's departure and the addition of Paul Mullen in 2007 the vocals continued to be split three ways. In 2008, the band re-worked the track, replacing the guitar and bass guitar in the first verse, with both Frost and Mullen playing synthesisers, building into two guitars in the choruses.

== Release ==
"Raoul" was originally released on 27 March 2006 on CD, digital download and limited edition 7" vinyl. Selected Tastemaker Stores stocked limited amounts of signed "Raoul" 7" vinyls. The release was promoted on the band's tour with Goldie Lookin Chain in March 2006, with "Raoul" pre-order passwords handed out on flyers on the tour dates. The release had two new tracks along with "Raoul" – "On The Campaign Trail" on the CD single and "Trophy Wives" on the 7" vinyl. Three in-store signings with performances were used to mark the single's release: Bridgend Jungle on 27 March, Cardiff Spillers on 28 March and Manchester Fopp on 30 March. The release was also celebrated by a sandwich giveaway courtesy of a Cardiff sandwich shop, Obriens, limited to 500 through the band's website.

In 2007, the band's record labels Polydor Records and B-Unique Records decided to re-release "Raoul" against the band's wishes to release another track from Not Accepted Anywhere or their newly recorded tracks "Steve McQueen" and "Revolution". The re-release was accompanied by a cover of Kanye West's "Gold Digger" as a B-side, as well as a new track, "Easy Target".

It's not something us as a band wanted to do, but the radio were begging for us to re-release it again. Basically we had radio stations begging us saying if you release this song we'll play it. It's really frustrating for a band to be releasing the same things when all you want to do is put out new stuff and get people to listening to your other music

– Iwan Griffiths discusses the "Raoul" re-release

The band's first TV appearance was performing "Raoul" on London Live. The song was also performed on Channel 4's Popworld, The Friday Night Project and T4 on the Beach in 2006. The track was played live on Later with Jools Holland, along with "Thats What She Said" and "Monster".

"Raoul" has been used on Soccer Am's 2006 Soundtrack, as well as being remixed by Culprit 1. However, unlike the "Recover" and "Monster" remixes by Culprit 1, the remix was not released on the single.

All of the release's artwork was created by Dean 'D*Face' Stockton, except for the original artwork which was only used for promotional CDs which was created by Antar. The globe style artwork was recreated by 'Rock Drops' and used in tour and festival appearances by the band as a stage banner.

== Music video ==
Top: the original video, the band with an actor representing "Raoul". Bottom: the band performing "Raoul" at an office party in the re-release music video.

=== Original ===
The video directed by Charlie Paul depicts the band 'taking a break' from studio work. They leave the studio and begin walking through a 1970s style concert where they look at themselves playing. They then walk through a gym and into another room where they are playing in a smaller dark venue. The video ends with them at Raoul's sandwich shop, with an actor who represents 'Raoul' making their sandwiches. The line from the song "Let's go back to work" then links in to the video, as they leave.

=== Re-release ===
The 2007 video directed by Up the Resolution is set in an office, and opens with a man singing "Monster". Another man does not seem to appreciate this and pushes him against a wall, possibly showing how the band are not happy with just being known for that song. The video goes on to show the band members working in the office. Robin Hawkins is delivering mail to the other employees, whilst in clips the whole band is shown at an office party, performing "Raoul", while Alex Pennie makes out with another older employee, whose husband is in a meeting with James Frost's character. The video ends with Iwan Griffiths urinating in a bowl.

== Reception ==
The single received fairly mixed reviews on both of its releases, many reviewers believing it did not match up to its predecessors "Recover" and "Monster". Lee Eynon of God is in the TV reviewed the track stating; "it isn’t really the colossal moby dick sized hook they need to follow their summer blockbuster", Donna Dobson of Click Music also listed how the track does not have "the charm or quirkiness of 'Monster'". During its original single run in 2006 Scott Colothan at Gigwise.com stated how the song didn't match up to the standards of the band's first single from 2005 – "Recover". Joanne Nugent of Contactmusic.com praised the track saying "definitely worth a listen and easily likeable" Tim Lee of Music OHM had mixed feeling on the song, ending his review with "as derivative additions to an over-saturated genre go, it's damn fine".

=== Charting ===
"Raoul" and "Monster" both competed for success in the UK Singles Chart after "Monster" left the top 40, and re-entered when Downloads via iTunes and other online stores were allowed to be included in the singles charts. The single only reached No. 30, with "Monster" re-entering at #33.

Chart	Peak	Date
UK Singles Chart	#32 original release	9 April 2006
UK Singles Chart	#30 re-release	14 January 2007

== Track listing ==
vinyl 26 March 2006
No.	Title	Length
1.	"Raoul"	3:29
2.	"Trophy Wives"	1:57

CD single, 26 March 2006
No.	Title	Length
1.	"Raoul"	3:29
2.	"On The Campaign Trail"	3:03

vinyl 8 January 2007
No.	Title	Length
1.	"Raoul"	3:29
2.	"Gold Digger (cover of Kanye West)"	3:22
3.	"Monster (Fatboy Slim Remix)"	5:59

CD single, 8 January 2007
No.	Title	Length
1.	"Raoul"	3:28
2.	"Easy Target"	3:52

== Personnel ==
Musicians

- Robin Hawkins – bass guitar, lead vocals
- Alex Pennie – synthesiser, percussion, vocals
- James Frost – guitar, vocals
- Iwan Griffiths – drums

Production

- Stephen Harris – producer
- Richard Jackson – producer, mixing (B-sides only)
- Sean Sinnot – engineer
- Simon Francis – mixing
