= Recover (song) =

Single by The Automatic

from the album Not Accepted Anywhere
- B-side: "Song 6", "Jack Daniels", "Time=Money"
- Released: 21 November 2005(original); 18 September 2006(re-release)
- Genre: Indie rock, post-punk revival
- Length: 2:57
- Label: B-Unique Records; Polydor Records
- Songwriters: James Frost; Iwan Griffiths; Robin Hawkins; Alex Pennie

The Automatic singles chronology
"Recover" (2005)	"Raoul" (2006)

Re-release singles chronology
""Recover" (re-release)" (2006)	""Raoul" (re-release)" (2007)

Alternative cover
- CD 2

"Recover" is the debut and fourth single by Welsh rock band The Automatic, taken from their debut album Not Accepted Anywhere. Originally released on 21 November 2005 as a limited 7" vinyl, CD single and digital download, it was re-released on 18 September 2006 as the band's record labels, B-Unique & Polydor, believed it could perform better and reach a larger audience after the band's success with previous single "Monster".

== Origins and recording ==
The track was originally recorded in 2005 at the Elevator Studios in Liverpool, with Ian Broudie as producer; this version was featured on the 21 November 2005 release, as well as on the Raoul EP and the UK version of Not Accepted Anywhere. The re-recording of "Recover" took place in Monnow Valley Studio in Monmouth, with Richard Jackson as producer. Both recordings were mixed by Stephen Harris. For the USA release of Not Accepted Anywhere the Ian Broudie mix was used, but it was remastered by Leon Zervos at Sterling Sound in New York City, and re-mixed by Mark Needham.

The song’s about being a waster and trying to motivate yourself into doing something better than sit in front of the television

— Rob Hawkins discusses the lyrics of "Recover"

== Release ==
The song was performed live on The Friday Night Project's third season, making The Automatic the first band to make a return performance after they performed their single "Raoul" the season before.

For the original 2005 release artwork by Antar was used on the CD and vinyl. In 2006 artist Dean 'D*Face' Stockton created two new separate artworks, which would be used for two CD singles and a 7" vinyl.

== Music videos ==
Top-The original video for Recover the band playing, Bottom the third video for Recover the band in the wrestling ring

Three music videos were ultimately made for "Recover".

=== Original ===
The original video for "Recover" was first released on 7 November 2005. The video features footage from live performances, as well as a small white room where all the bandmates are singing and jumping around. The video was rarely aired, however is available on The Automatic's website, as well as YouTube. The music video was directed by Phaelon Productions

=== Second version ===
A second video was also released which received airplay on MTV2 and other music stations, the video features live footage, and shots from the original video. This version cuts out all of the previous scenes with the large mouths instead of heads on the band members, as well as cutting out all scenes of the women who pass out in the park.

=== Re-release (third) ===
The latest version of The Automatic's video for "Recover" released on 1 September 2006 and directed by Up the Resolution, is based around a wrestling match, where the band are dressed as several different people each, both spectators and other various people, whilst they perform on the stage/ring. Whilst this is going on the 'fight' is also happening; however, the camera switches to and from the fight, and the band playing on the same ring.

== Track listing ==
Vinyl, 21 November 2005
No.	Title	Length
1.	"Recover"	2:53
2.	"Song6"	3:29

CD single, 21 November 2005
No.	Title	Length
1.	"Recover"	2:53
2.	"Jack Daniels"	3:10

Vinyl, 18 September 2006
No.	Title	Length
1.	"Recover"	2:53
2.	"Recover (Culprit One Remix)"	2:53

CD single 1, 18 September 2006
No.	Title	Length
1.	"Recover"	2:53
2.	"Time = Money"	3:07

CD single 2, 18 September 2006
No.	Title	Length
1.	"Recover"	3:28
2.	"That's What She Said (Live at the Electric Ballroom)"	3:13
3.	"Monster Lego DIY music video"
4.	"Up the Resolution's Recover music video"

7digital exclusive, 18 September 2006
No.	Title	Length
1.	"Recover (Live at Leeds)"	2:58
