= Viva Machine =

Welsh rock band

- Origin: Swansea, Wales
- Genres: Alternative rock Progressive rock Pop
- Years active: 2003 – September 2009 (On Hiatus)
- Label: Rocklouder Records
- Members: Chris Seacombe; Tom Stephens; Gareth Carter; Dai Francis; Justin Hendy
- Website: http://www.vivamachine.com

Viva Machine were a Welsh rock band, formed in 2003. Initially known as Ipsofacto, they adopted the name Viva Machine in 2006. In 2008 they added a second guitarist and synth player Justin Hendy. The band announced an indefinite hiatus in September 2009.

== History ==
The band released their first single, "My Jet Set Radio", on 4 December 2006, which had a small amount of airplay on BBC Radio 1, as well as being featured on ITV show The Guest List, where the band also performed.

In 2007, working with producer Richard Jackson, the band wrote and recorded their debut album, recording 15 album tracks and around 20 b-sides. They finished most of the album in mid-2008. "Robotbodyrox" was the first single from the album, with "Go! Go! Go!" as the b-side. The music video for the single was released online on 21 October 2008.

In September 2008 the band added another guitarist and synth player Justin Hendy.

The band's debut album, Viva Machine, was released on 15 June 2009 by Rocklouder Records, after a break from live shows so bassist Tom Stephens could finish his degree. The track "Earthquakers & Loveshakers" was released as a free download on 8 June to promote the album's release.

In September 2009 the band announced a lengthy, possibly indefinite hiatus, citing financial and educational commitments.

== Influences ==
In an interview in 2007, the band cited influences including Clutch, Queens of the Stone Age, Weezer, Jarcrew, Biffy Clyro, Radiohead and The Beach Boys.

== Band members ==
- Chris Seacombe (vocals, synth)
- Tom Stephens (bass, vocals)
- Gareth Carter (guitar, vocals)
- Dai "D.P. Francais" Francis (drums)
- Justin Hendy (guitar, synth)(2008–present)

== Discography ==
=== Albums ===
- Viva Machine (2009)

=== Singles ===
- "My Jet Set Radio" (2006)
- "Robotbodyrox" (2008)
- "Earthquakers & Loveshakers" (2009)
