= Not Accepted Anywhere =

Studio album by The Automatic
- Released: 19 June 2006
- Recorded: October 2005–January 2006, Cardiff's Stir studio, Liverpool's Elevator studio, South Thoresby's The Chapel studio, Hammersmith's The Peace Rooms
- Genres: Indie rock, post-punk revival, alternative rock
- Length: UK 40:26; USA 43:49; Japan 47:28
- Labels: B-Unique, Polydor, Columbia
- Producers: Stephen Harris, Richard Jackson, Ian Broudie

The Automatic chronology
Not Accepted Anywhere (2006)	Raoul EP (2006)

Singles from Not Accepted Anywhere
- 1. "Recover" Released: 21 November 2005; 2. "Raoul" Released: 27 March 2006; 3. "Monster" Released: 5 June 2006

USA/Canada artwork
- The USA/Canadian version of Not Accepted Anywhere as The Automatic Automatic

Not Accepted Anywhere is the debut album from Welsh rock band The Automatic, originally released in the United Kingdom on 19 June 2006 and in the United States on 22 June 2007. Working with producers Stephen Harris, Richard Jackson and Ian Broudie on different tracks at a variety of studios around the United Kingdom the album was released through a joint deal between B-Unique Records and Polydor Records.

The album spawned three singles, all of which charted in the UK top 40; "Recover" – which was originally released in 2005, then again in 2006, "Raoul" in 2006 and again in 2007, and "Monster" in 2006. "Monster" was also featured and used in the BBC show Torchwood series one, episode 6: "Countrycide".

Not Accepted Anywhere charted at No. 3 in the UK top 40, being awarded platinum certification in music sales. The BBC named it amongst the top 10 greatest Welsh albums of the 2000s (decade).

== Recording and production ==
The band recorded demos in early 2005 with Richard Jackson, amongst which were "Monster", "Rats" and "By My Side", early versions of which included Rob Hawkins playing flute on. The demo was sent to B-Unique, who subsequently came to one of the band's live performances, signing them on the spot.

Recording the album took place in late 2005 through to early 2006 over a six-week period. The six weeks of recording were split into four blocks, taking place in Cardiff at Stir studio, Liverpool at The Elevator studio, South Thoresby at The Chapel studio and Hammersmith at The Peace Rooms. Over the four locations the band worked with 3 different producers, including Richard Jackson in Cardiff, Ian Broudie in Liverpool and Stephen Harris.

For release of Not Accepted Anywhere in the United States a year later the band along with Leon Zervos at Sterling Studios in New York re-worked and re-mixed the entire record, changing various levels of previous recordings to sound how they had originally envisioned. Rob Hawkins said in an interview with They Will Rock You: "The production is different, it's been mixed to sound a bit more raw and a bit more rock, which is probably more reflective of the way we are live than the UK version is".

== Composition ==
In retrospect Rob Hawkins described the lyrics of Not Accepted Anywhere as personal to the band members experiences up until that point. The title itself is a play upon MasterCard's promotional phrase "Accepted Everywhere". The band originally considered calling the album Now Here in Nowhere.

Lead track "That's What She Said" makes references to pop culture and the drones of day-to-day lives - waiting for the weekend to begin, "Raoul" similarly is about being stuck in routines - with Raoul's being a sandwich shop in Cardiff were the band would escape during studio time. "You Shout You Shout You Shout You Shout" also deals with pop culture - specifically pop music and those who listen to it. "Recover" is about "trying to motivate yourself and do something other than sit in front of the TV".

"Monster" is about binge drinking and being intoxicated on alcohol, which reveals the monster in people. Both "Seriously...I Hate You Guys" and "Team Drama" were written about people in the band's lives who "force their problems onto you". "On The Campaign Trail" was written about the band's first experiences of touring in the United Kingdom, with the title referencing Hunter S. Thompson's Fear and Loathing on the Campaign Trail '72.

Not Accepted Anywhere combined elements of dance-punk, indie rock and hard rock. Much of the heavier distorted guitars originally recorded for the album were either removed or made less prominent in the first release of Not Accepted Anywhere. The band used 3 different synthesisers during the recording of the album - an Alesis Micron, Roland Juno-106 and an Alesis Andromeda. Vocal parts were split between Rob Hawkins who sings the lead vocal on each track, whilst James Frost provides backing vocals and Alex Pennie provides both screams and flat vocals. Many albums tracks have three distinctly separate vocal parts, using call and response style layering.

== Artwork ==
The sleeve and album booklet artwork was created by Richard Stockton. The different pieces of the artwork represent different songs on the album; "That's What She Said" is represented by "BLAH BLAH BLAH" in a speech bubble, "Raoul" is represented by a sandwich, whilst "Recover" is represented by a megaphone - a reference to the original music video directed by Phaelon Productions. "Monster" is referenced by a pill, a sign with "home" written on it refers to "Lost at Home". "Keep Your Eyes Peeled" is represented by the eyeballs, "Seriously...I Hate You Guys" is depicted by a piece of screwed up paper with "hate" scrawled on it. A baseball bat with "drama" written on it refers to track "Team Drama". On top of the banner of "The Automatic" sits a rat, referring to the track "Rats".

For the album's release in the Japan and the United States the artwork is yellow, as opposed to green, with the United States version also changed to The Automatic Automatic due to the legal issues surrounding using the title The Automatic in America. Richard Stockton also designed artwork for the singles from Not Accepted Anywhere; "Monster", "Raoul" and "Recover".

== Release ==
Over the course of 2005, demos of "Monster" and "Rats" were made available for streaming on MySpace and through the band's website. The first completed album track to be released was "Recover" on 21 November 2005 as a limited 7" vinyl and limited CD single, featuring "Jack Daniel's" and "Song6" as b-sides. Second single "Raoul" was released with b-side "Trophy Wives" and album track "On The Campaign Trail" on 27 March 2006 as a standard non-limited CD/vinyl single.

The album's title, track-listing and release date were revealed on 27 April 2006, along with release details for the band's third single "Monster", with an album release of 19 June 2006 and a single release on 5 June 2006. After the album's release a compilation EP, also titled Raoul, was released, featuring singles "Monster", "Raoul" and "Recover", as well as album track "On The Campaign Trail" and b-sides "Jack Daniel's", "Song6", "High Tide on Caroline Street", "Trophy Wives" and "Night Drive".

Debut single "Recover" was re-recorded and re-released on 18 September 2006, similarly second single "Raoul" was re-worked slightly and received a re-release on 8 January 2007, along with a studio-recording of the band's cover of Kanye West's single "Gold Digger" and a new b-side "Easy Target". The re-release was made on a limited 7" picture disc.

In support of the band's 2007 tour of the United States of America the album was set for release on 26 June 2007, proceeded by a US release of single "Monster" on 5 June 2007, and the EP So Nice Say It Twice on 19 June 2007.

== Promotion ==
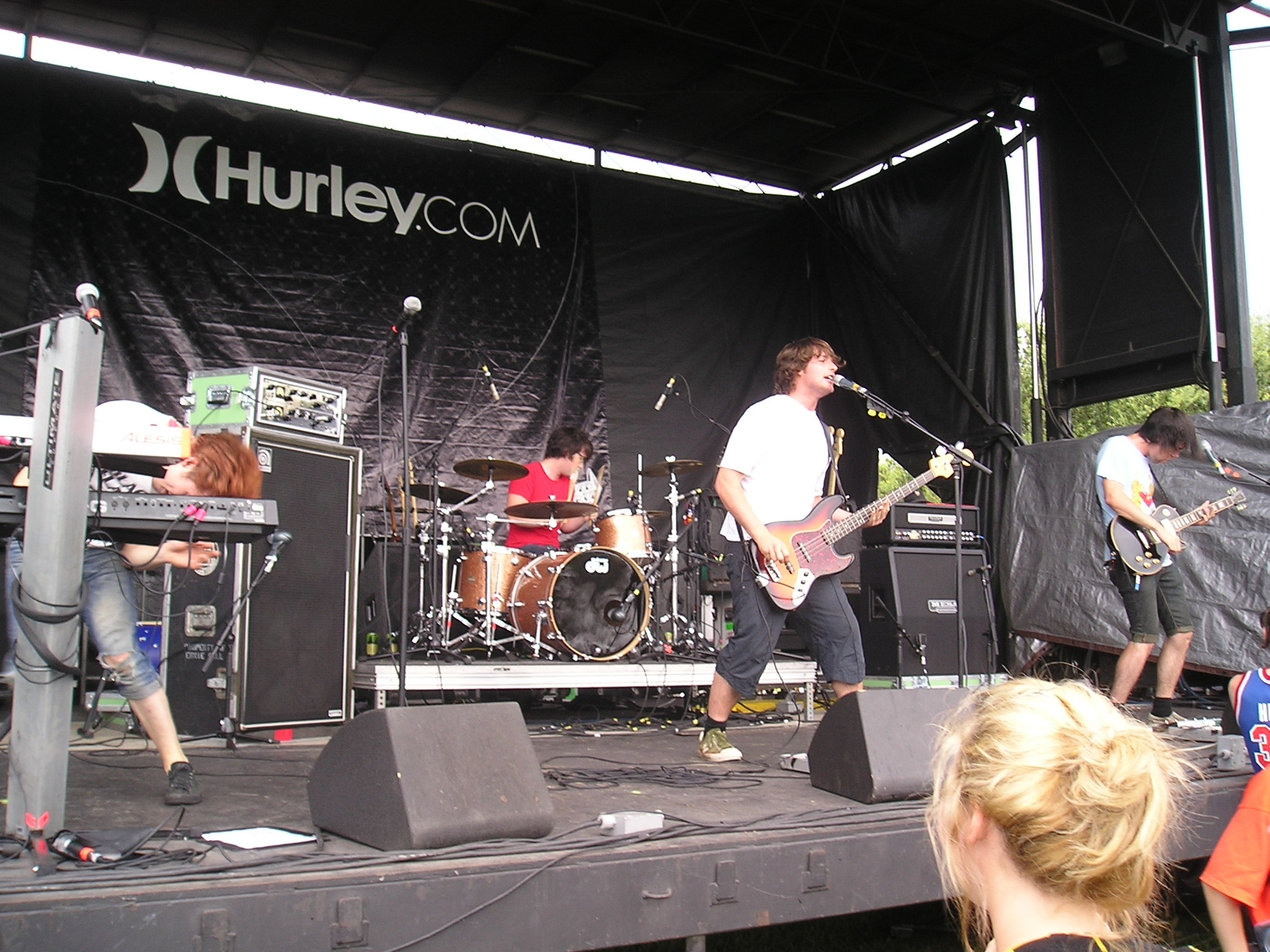
The Automatic on the 2007 Warped Tour

=== Media coverage ===
The Automatic made their television debut on 24 February 2006, performing "Raoul" on The Friday Night Project, becoming the first band to make a return performance on the show, performing "Recover" in August. They made an appearance on 18 March on The Album Chart Show. The band appeared on Popworld multiple times, performing "Raoul", "Recover" and "Monster" – all on separate occasions, as well as being featured in a behind the scenes look at the music video for "Monster", trying out pig farming, and a behind the scenes look at the 2007 NME Tour.

The band also appeared on Transmission, T4 on the Beach, Soccer AM, Never Mind The Buzzcocks, Fuse TV's The Vinnie Langdon Show and headlined Later... with Jools Holland after Keane were unable to play. Festival performances from Reading and Leeds 2006 and Glastonbury Festival 2007 were also shown on the BBC.

The band were asked to perform on GMTV on 21 July 2006 at around 9:00 am, having performed the night before at Carling Academy Bristol and being unhappy with the GMTV appearance the next day, James Frost stated that the band "decided to stay up all night after the gig". The performance resulted in James Frost and Alex Pennie destroying their rented equipment, diving into the drum kit, and getting undressed, whilst singer/bassist Rob Hawkins and drummer Iwan continued to mime along to "Monster". Pennie later explained "Frost was pretty drunk when we started 'Monster', and I'm easily led. Before we knew it I was standing in my boxer shorts in the GMTV garden and Frost had trashed all the equipment." During the incident, a cameraman allegedly received a glancing injury from guitarist James Frost and threatened the band with legal action. This matter was later resolved. The band stated that they doubted they will ever be asked back, although they had 'not been banned' by GMTV.

The band appeared in radio session for Zane Lowe's BBC Radio 1 show on 22 February 2006 on, performing tracks in session. The band covered Kanye West's song "Gold Digger" in BBC Radio 1 Live Lounge in summer 2006. Their performance at the Lemon Grove in Exeter was also broadcast on Steve Lamacq's BBC 6 Music show on 3 October 2006.

=== Touring ===
In 2005 and in early 2006 the band predominantly played support shows, opening for bands such as The Kooks, Kaiser Chiefs, The Ordinary Boys and Goldie Lookin Chain. The band were billed on the NME 2006 New Music Tour, opening for Boy Kill Boy, before extensively headlining their own tours across the United Kingdom. In the summer of 2006 the band performed at T4 On The Beach, Oxegen Festival, T in the Park, Cardiff Big Weekend, Reading and Leeds Festivals amongst others. Touring also took places in other parts of Europe and in Japan, before headlining the NME Indie Rock Tour 2007, with support coming from The View, The Horrors and Mumm-Ra. For the majority of 2007 the band toured the United States of America, playing South by Southwest Festival, Warped Tour and headlining their own USA tour, whilst returning for sporadic UK dates, such as Glastonbury Festival and The Full Ponty festival. Touring and promotion for Not Accepted Anywhere ended on 26 August 2007 at Get Loaded in the Park, which was the final live appearance with Alex Pennie as a member of The Automatic.

== Reception ==
Not Accepted Anywhere
Review scores
Source	Rating
AllMusic	3/5 stars
BBC	Positive
Drowned in Sound	5/10
Gigwise	4/5 stars
The Guardian	3/5 stars
The Times	Mixed
NME	8/10
The Skinny	4/5 stars
This Is Fake DIY	8/10

Dan Martin of NME highly praised Not Accepted Anywhere, stating "there’s no slow bits; instead, every single tune has pop, punk, emo, techno, electro and funk rammed in, and there’s 12 of these melt-in-the-mouth morsels," pointing out vocalist and keyboardist Alex Pennie as one of the band's unique selling points claiming "soon all bands will have an Alex Pennie," describing him as a "borderline Tourette’s bashing a keyboard with his fists and screeching backing vocals, have made him sound like a new instrument all of its own." The BBC ranked the album as one of the top 10 albums to come out of Wales between 2000 and 2010, with Tom Smith claiming they had produced an album full of "three-minute pop jewels". A positive review from This Is Fake DIY stated it takes just 30 seconds before the first "yelping, jerking irresistible hook line, trashing the hype machine in the process". Gigwise's Jeff Ando claimed that "the Automatic could be the band of 2006," comparing their music to that of The Killers and Kaiser Chiefs, also commenting that any of the 12 tracks could stand release as a single. The Guardian awarded Not Accepted Anywhere 3 out of 5 commenting "your standard four-piece band is now doing the guitar and drums thing at twice the speed, powered by an urgent rage," believing that the band had the potential and recipe to take their music into top 5 the UK music charts. Jon Seller of Scottish music magazine The Skinny praised the album's originality and interesting vocal arrangements, awarding 4 out of 5 stars.

Drowned in Sound reviewer Dom Gourlay awarded the album 5 out of 10, labelling single "Monster" as "big, dumb and totally unforgettable", however questioned why a band who could write such a catchy song would write an album which "reeks of such depressing déjà vu". Steve Jelbert of The Times called Not Accepted Anywhere a "reasonable debut album", yet "already dated". Reviewing the 2007 re-release in the United States multi-media site IGN called the album repetitive, awarding only 5 out of 10 stars, calling single "Raoul" a Kaiser Chiefs throwaway, only praising track "You Shout You Shout You Shout You Shout".

== Track listing ==
No.	Title	Length
1.	"That's What She Said"	3:15
2.	"Raoul"	3:53
3.	"You Shout You Shout You Shout You Shout"	3:06
4.	"Recover"	2:52
5.	"Monster"	3:41
6.	"Lost at Home"	3:26
7.	"Keep Your Eyes Peeled"	3:01
8.	"Seriously... I Hate You Guys"	3:27
9.	"On the Campaign Trail"	3:01
10.	"Team Drama"	3:13
11.	"By My Side"	3:46
12.	"Rats"	3:39

USA
No.	Title	Length
13.	"Gold Digger" (cover of Kanye West)	3:23

Bonus Track Version
No.	Title	Length
13.	"Song 6"	3:28
14.	"Monster" (Culprit 1 Remix)	3:53

iTunes
No.	Title	Length
13.	"Monster" (Live at Electric Ballroom)	4:17

B-Sides
No.	Title	Length
1.	"Jack Daniels" (featured on Recover & Raoul EP)	3:10
2.	"Song 6" (featured on Recover & Raoul EP)	3:28
3.	"Trophy Wives" (featured on Raoul & Raoul EP)	1:57
4.	"Night Drive" (featured on Monster & Raoul EP)	4:12
5.	"High Tide on Caroline Street" (featured on Monster & Raoul EP)	2:57
6.	"Time=Money" (featured on Recover (re-release))	3:07
7.	"Easy Target" (featured on Raoul (re-release))	3:52

== Personnel ==
The Automatic

- Robin Hawkins - lead vocals, bass guitar
- James Frost - guitar, vocals
- Alex Pennie - synthesisers, keyboards, percussion, unclean vocals
- Iwan Griffiths - drums, percussion

Production

- Ian Broudie - producer on "Recover"
- Stephen Harris - producer
- Richard Jackson - producer

Artwork

- D*Face

== Chart performance ==
The album itself hit No. 3 in the UK Album Chart. Four of the five UK singles were also entered to UK Singles Charts. "Monster" topped all 4, hitting number 4, whilst Recover reached 25, and Raoul releases reached 34 and 44.

Chart (2006)	Entry	Peak position	Certification	Sales
UK Album Chart	July 2006	3	Gold	
UK Re-entry	January 2007	33	Gold	
	2009		Platinum	
