= The Automatic =

Welsh rock band

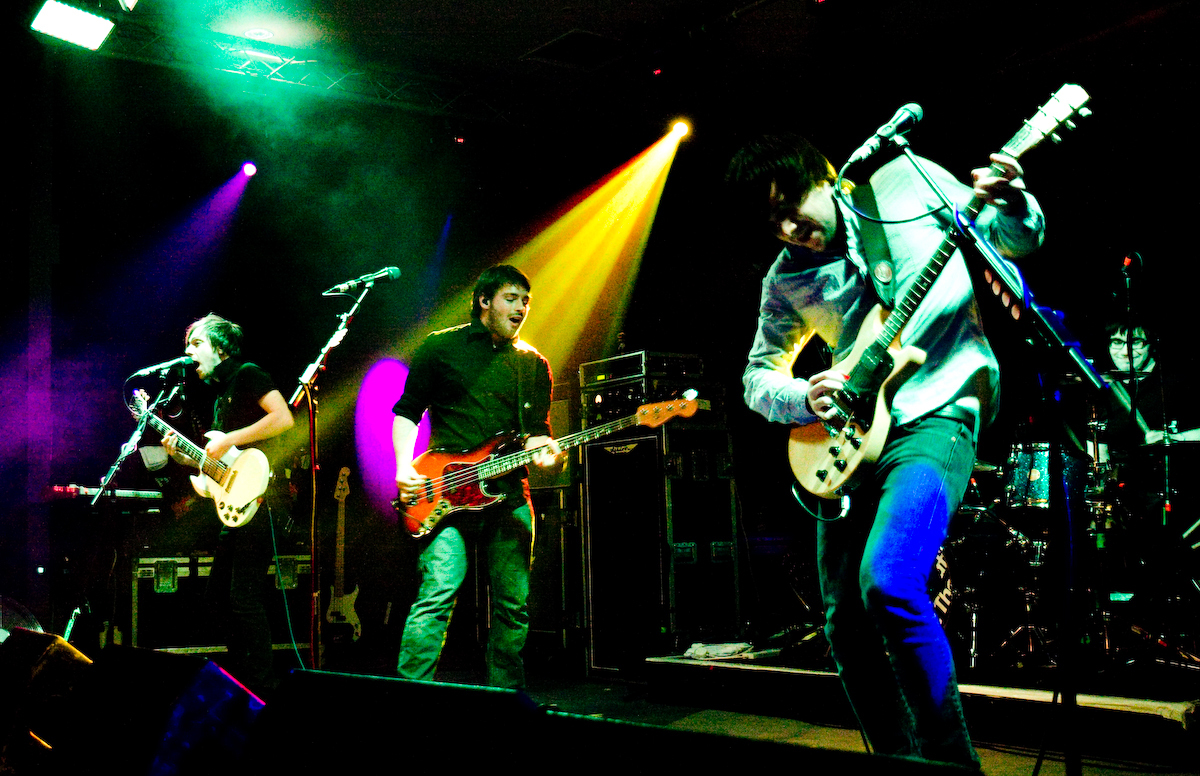
- The Automatic performing in 2008, left to right: Paul Mullen, Robin Hawkins, James Frost and Iwan Griffiths.

Background information
- Origin: Cowbridge, Vale of Glamorgan, Wales
- Genres: Indie rock, alternative rock, post-punk revival, post-hardcore, dance-punk (early)
- Years active: 1998–2010
- Labels: Armoured, B-Unique, Polydor, Columbia
- Spinoffs: Goodtime Boys
- Past members: James Frost; Iwan Griffiths; Robin Hawkins; Alex Pennie; Paul Mullen

The Automatic (also known as The Automatic Automatic in the U.S.) were a Welsh rock band. The band's final lineup was composed of Robin Hawkins on vocals, bass and synthesisers, James Frost on guitar, synthesisers and backing vocals, Iwan Griffiths on drums and Paul Mullen on vocals, guitar and synthesiser. Mullen joined after the departure of Alex Pennie, who provided synthesiser, percussion and vocals.

Signing to a deal between B-Unique Records and Polydor Records in 2005, the band released their platinum selling debut Not Accepted Anywhere in 2006, which spawned three UK top 40 singles – "Raoul", "Recover" and "Monster". The band released their second album This Is A Fix accompanied by only one single, "Steve McQueen" in 2008, which due to a dispute between the band's labels – B-Unique and Polydor – was plagued with distributional and promotional problems. The dispute led to the band withdrawing from their 5-album deal with the labels and instead formed their own label, Armoured Records, distributed through EMI.

The band released their third album Tear the Signs Down in 2010 with the singles "Interstate", "Run & Hide" and "Cannot Be Saved". Following completing promoting and touring the album in 2010, the band have been inactive.

== History ==
=== Band beginnings (1998–2004) ===
The members first met at primary school, in the early 1990s, and formed a band at the age of 13. Alex Pennie was asked to join five years later. Originally known as White Rabbit, up until February 2005 when they renamed themselves The Automatic because they believe that music is the antidote to "the automatic life". After recording their two-track demo featuring rough versions of "Monster" and "Rats" in 2005 they signed a five-album record deal with B-Unique Records in their gap year.

=== Not Accepted Anywhere (2005–2007) ===
After signing a record deal with B-Unique the band began the writing and recording of their first record, the first release from which came in the form of "Recover" on 7 November 2005 along with b-side "Jack Daniels". B-Unique gave them only two months to write and produce a record with a January deadline which caused the band to believe that the tracks on the record came out sounding quite similar to each other. Whilst début single "Recover" did not chart, it had still gained them publicity and NME put the band on their new music tour, calling them "The sound of 2006". They were also named Best New Band in the Pop Factory Awards 2005.

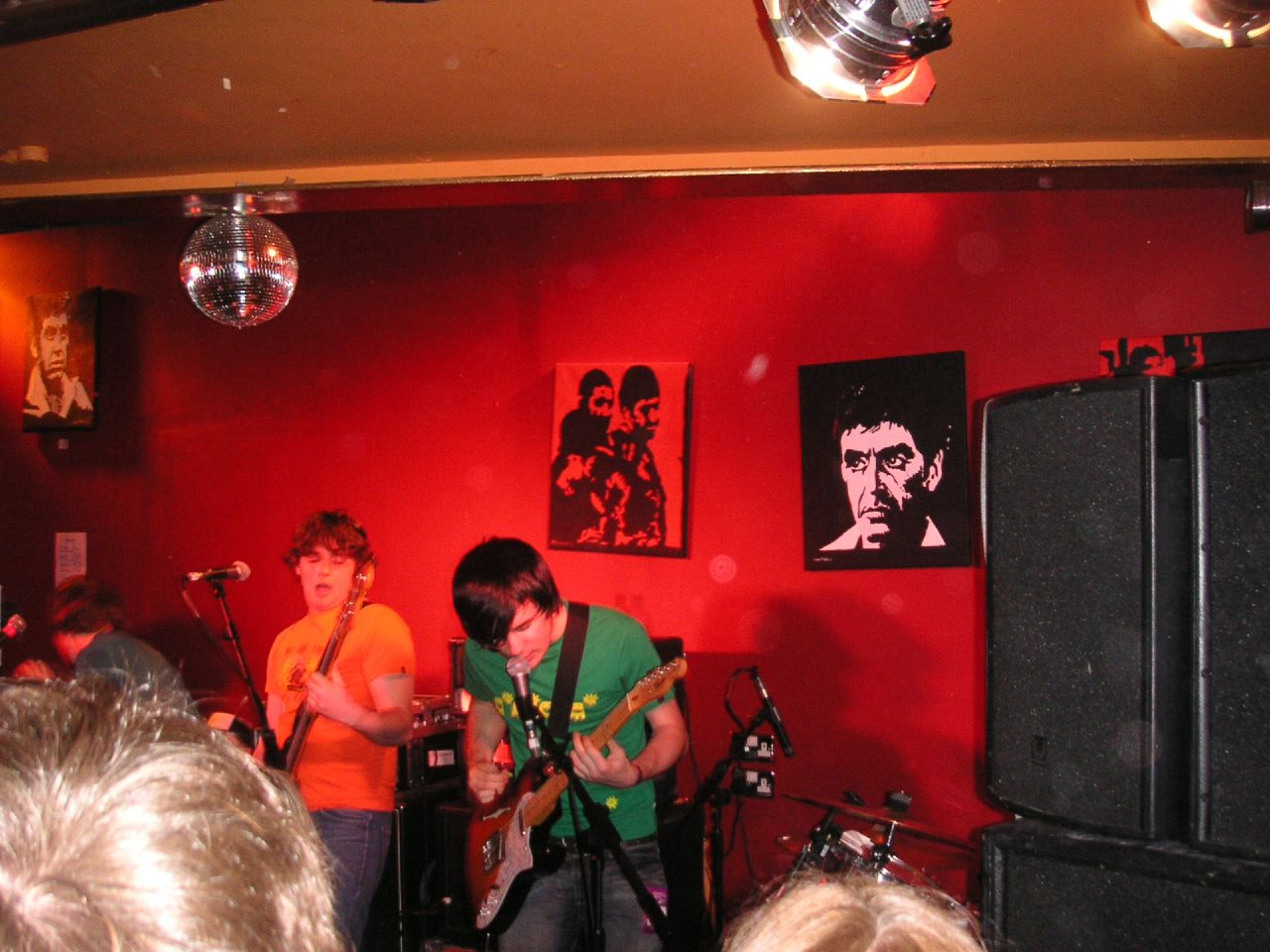
The Automatic on Camden Crawl in 2006

After touring with The Kooks in early 2006 the band released a second single "Raoul" on 27 March 2006 which reached a peak in the UK Singles Chart of No. 35. Album track "On The Campaign Trail" was issued as the b-side on the CD single, whilst "Trophy Wives" was released on the vinyl. "Raoul" received a large amount of airplay on MTV Two amongst other channels. The band travelled around the UK touring, promoting the single, and promoting their forthcoming album with instore signings.

On 27 April 2006 Not Accepted Anywhere was announced. The 12 track album was released on B-Unique Records on 19 June 2006 with a new single "Monster", and was supported by further tour dates. When the album arrived it received mixed reactions, many reviewers highlighting the high pitched backing screams from Alex Pennie as either a musical choice that gave the band a unique identity, or as a choice which detracted from the rest of the album. Dom Gourlay of Drowned in Sound wrote "the unnecessary screeching of the keyboard player [was] just a tad irritating – bordering on the side of wanting to commit homicide – at the best of times" whilst NME wrote "...screeching backing vocals, have made him sound like a new instrument all of its own". The album remained very popular reaching number No. 3 in the UK Album Chart and staying in the chart for over half a year. The new single "Monster" also proved to be a huge success, reaching No. 4 in the single chart. The Automatic have been described as a one hit wonder despite "Monster" being their second top 40 single, but the band has said since its release that they felt no pressure, nor was it an objective to come up with something as popular as "Monster" in the future. The Raoul EP, a collection of b-sides and songs which didn't make the final album was released on 17 July 2006.

Following the release of the album the band went on tour with Cat The Dog and Welsh friends Viva Machine, and played a 13 date tour across the United Kingdom . This included their hugely publicised appearance on GMTV as well as a UK festival circuit, including Reading and Leeds festival, T4 on the Beach and T in the Park, culminating in their fourth single which was a re-release of "Recover", re-recorded for a larger release than its original limited release the year before. The single peaked at No. 32 in the UK after its release on 18 September 2006, and at this time the band played various dates around Europe and Japan.

We wrote a song, it did really well, I don't really see what there is to be upset about. You get labelled "one hit wonders", but that's more hits than most people have. And it's not like we've disappeared without a trace. We've got a second album coming out, which in my opinion is full of much better songs. We wouldn't have been in a position to fly to LA to make a record if it wasn't for 'Monster'."

— Robin Hawkins on the success of "Monster"

Over Christmas 2006 the band wrote and recorded two new songs which would begin play next year on the NME Rock Tour 2007, titled "Steve McQueen" and "Revolution" (now known as "Secret Police"). These were accompanied by a cover of Life During Wartime by Talking Heads, as well as a rerelease of "Raoul". The decision to rerelease "Raoul" was made by B-Unique Records, with The Automatic saying that they were not into the idea of releasing Raoul again. The single charted slightly higher than the original release, at No. 32 instead of No. 36 in the UK single chart.

After extensive UK touring the band released Not Accepted Anywhere in the United States and Canada in June 2007. This preceded their attendance at the Warped Tour 2007 and was opened with their first U.S. single, "Monster" which was released on 14 May 2007. After the Warped Tour and release of the album they embarked on their first USA Tour, before returning to the United Kingdom for their final show of the Not Accepted Anywhere era, Get Loaded in the Park.

=== Departure of Alex Pennie, Paul Mullen joins, This Is a Fix (2007–2008) ===
On 18 September 2007 it was announced by The Automatic that Alex Pennie had left The Automatic. Alex performed for the final time with bandmates at Get Loaded in the Park 2007, however had been active for some time with the band assisting with the writing process of their second album, This Is A Fix. It was announced through the band's website and through the band's MySpace that Pennie had been finding playing with his bandmates "increasingly unenjoyable" and that he had been growing apart from them.

In November 2007, NME reported that the band have had no direct contact with Pennie since the split, which also took place earlier than the official split according to his former bandmates. Hawkins has exchanged MySpace messages with Pennie however, reporting that he is doing ok, and that he now has a new punk band. Alex Pennie later stated that he is returning to the UK to start work on "a new project". This was subsequently announced by Pennie through his Myspace profile to be Decimals, in which he performs lead vocals. Pennie confirmed in 2009 that there were no hard feelings and that he and his band Decimals were in the same Cardiff studio as The Automatic, working with the same people, he described the situation as "like seeing an ex-girlfriend" and that both he and his former bandmates are on good terms.

It was never going to spell the end of the band. Him staying would have spelt the end of it", said the singer. "He didn't want to be in the band anymore and what he did on the first album, the screaming thing, there's only so far you can take that, really. We couldn't have progressed... There's no regrets on either side as far as I know.

— Rob Hawkins

After the departure of Alex Pennie the band was quick to make a new recruitment, Paul Mullen of Yourcodenameis:Milo was brought in after his band went on hiatus, taking on the position of guitarist, vocalist and synth player, so he would not be a direct replacement for Alex Pennie. The band had already been at work before Pennie's departure and had around 10 songs already done, two of which were "Steve McQueen" and "Secret Police", which both had been performed throughout 2007 on various tours.

After working in Cardiff in their studio, the band flew out to Los Angeles, California where they began working with Don Gilmore, who has worked with the likes of Linkin Park and Dashboard Confessional, however were not happy with the results, thus switched to working with Butch Walker (Fall Out Boy, The All American Rejects, Simple Plan) where they worked for some time, until having to return to the United Kingdom where they finished up much of the record back in Cardiff working with Rich Jackson, who worked with the band on Not Accepted Anywhere.

After the recording process was complete, the band drew up proposals for a concert in March, the band began a club tour, playing at smaller venues to "get up close" with the fans, supported by friends Viva Machine with the likes of Canterbury and Attack Attack also performing at select dates. The band's first single from This Is a Fix was soon announced, "Steve McQueen", first played on the NME 2007 Tour, would arrive on 18 August 2008, a further number of tour dates were also announced for August and September, the band were also announced to be play at Reading and Leeds Festivals, as well as performing at the UK release of the Rock Band video game, Glastonbury, and a number of other festivals and gigs around Europe.

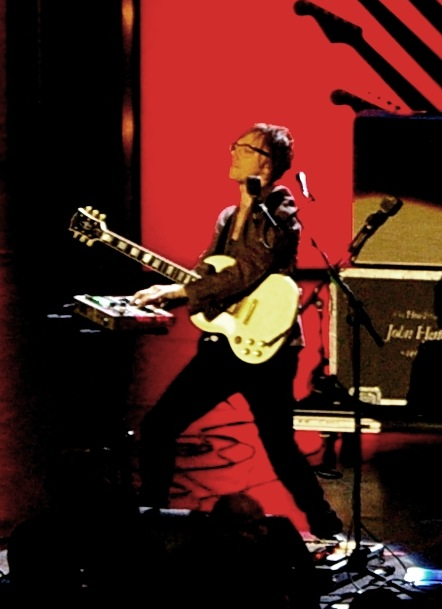
Paul Mullen (right) was not a direct replacement for Alex Pennie (left), Paul would not be mimicking Pennie's vocal style, and would be playing guitar, with synthesisers and keyboards split between Paul, Frost and Rob.

Single "Steve McQueen" was premièred on the Zane Lowe show on BBC Radio 1 on 7 July 2008, the following day NME.com broadcast the music video for the first time, following this track "This Is A Fix" was released as a free gift on 30 July 2008 via download. On 18 August, the release day of Steve McQueen, the entire album became available on the band's Myspace page, the band also days later performed an all new cover, "Love in This Club" by "Usher" on the BBC Radio 1 Live Lounge.

After the album's release the band completed two UK album tours in the remaining months of 2008, before heading back into studio to work on new tracks. At The Asylum in Birmingham, the band confirmed "Magazines" to be the second single from This Is A Fix originally stating a release would happen in February 2009, however this date was scrapped. The Automatic along with Get Cape. Wear Cape. Fly., Frank Turner and My Vitriol were announced in early 2009 to be part of the final show at the London Astoria on Wednesday 14 January, a charity show for Love Music Hate Racism and Jail Guitar Doors.

=== Tear the Signs Down, Armoured Records (2009–2010) ===
Since the start of 2009 the band began working in studio on new tracks, and by March had around 10 songs in various stages of development, some being demoed and some not. The band fully recorded 4 of the new tracks in early April, and on 18 April it was confirmed that the new tracks are towards the band's third studio album.

New track "Something Else" was made available to stream through the band's website on 6 August 2009, with a music video produced by Frost depicting touring in Ibiza, Poland, Dubai and Switzerland – and recording in Cardiff. New material was further teased in August through to October, with photos depicting the band working with a violinist and cellist, song title "Parasol" was also revealed.

On 28 September 2009, the band announced a string of UK dates for November, which would coincide with the release of new single "Interstate". It was also revealed that the band had terminated their contract to release 5 records through B-Unique and Polydor Records after the two labels partnership which The Automatic were the child of ended; causing the ill promotion and distribution of their previous album This Is A Fix. Instead, the band would self finance their third record, allowing for 'complete creative control', Armoured Records was founded, with a distribution partnership with EMI.

In October filming took place for single "Interstate" in Cardiff outside Chapter Arts Centre in front of a wood sculpture created by Alan Goulbourne. Filming then took place days later for the band's appearance on Chris Moyles' Quiz Night. "Interstate" premiered on XFM on 3 November 2009, with the music video released straight after onto YouTube. The album's title Tear the Signs Down and release date for 8 March 2010 were also revealed. Track "Something Else" which was previously available to stream was also released as a free download through Music Glue.

January through March 2010 tour dates were revealed by The Fly as soon as the band's November tour ended. Second single "Run and Hide" which was previously titled "Parasol" premiered on Zane Lowe's Radio 1 show on 19 January 2010, with a release set for 1 March 2010 – a week before the release of the album. The music video saw release a week later, shot at the re-opened Cardiff Coal Exchange. Tear the Signs Down was met by critics in a similar way to the band's previous releases, receiving both very positive and negative responses, Rock Sound awarded the album 9/10 believing it would "surely stand out as one of the finest British records of the year" whilst magazine The Skinny critic Nick Mitchell wrote "It's difficult to imagine even their core audience (the Hollyoaks demographic) getting excited about this confused, weak album" awarding only a single star.

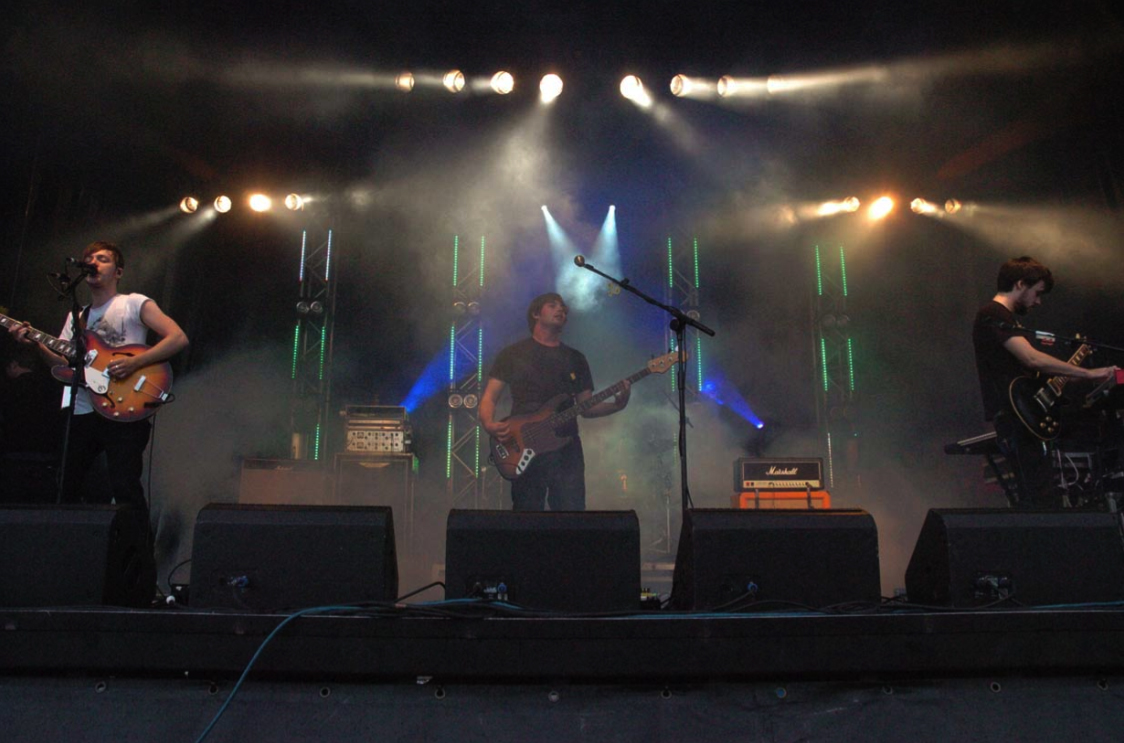
The Automatic performing at Barry Waterfront festival in 2009, where they showcased various new tracks from Tear the Signs Down

After the band's UK tour with Straight Lines and White Belt Yellow Tag it was teased that the band were hoping to support Irish rock band Ash in April & May, however this never materialised. An alternative version of "Cannot Be Saved" was revealed as the third single from Tear the Signs Down, and would be released on 20 June 2010, with a music video from the touring earlier in the year directed by Frost released on Rock Sound and NME on 2 June 2010. Two days after "Cannot Be Saved" live versions from Oxford Academy of "Run and Hide" and "Raoul" were released as free downloads through Rock Midgets, with live versions of "Sleepwalking" and "Magazines" also made available to stream through the band's SoundCloud.

Over the summer months of 2010 performances included Pritchattsbury Festival in Birmingham, Kilmarnock Festival in Scotland, Monmouth Festival and Jedi Music Festival in Liverpool. Along with The Blackout and Young Guns the band were announced as part of the line-up for Funeral for a Friend's Casually Dressed & Deep in Conversation dates in July 2010.

Tear the Signs Down was amongst the BBC's 10 greatest Welsh albums of 2010. On 24 December 2010 an unreleased cover of "New Sensation" by INXS from the This Is A Fix recording sessions was made available for streaming on SoundCloud.

=== Other projects (2010–present) ===
The Automatic ended in 2010, following being dropped by their label and the firing of their manager. Mullen formed Young Legionnaire with Bloc Party bassist Gordon Moakes, who released their debut album Crisis Works in 2011. Frost formed a project called EFFORT with Radio 1 DJ Jen Long; the pair released a 3 track EP in 2010. Singer/bassist Rob enrolled at Cardiff University studying Computer Science BSc, whilst drummer Iwan studied law.

Mullen also joined Tom Bellamy's band Losers in recording their second record, East London band HorseFight and in later 2012 joined former The King Blues guitarist Jamie Jazz in forming Bleach Blood who released their debut EP The Young Heartbreakers Club in 2013. On 20 March 2013 Iwan posted three previously unheard tracks by The Automatic on the band's Facebook. The tracks 'Just Because You Feel It', 'Where Have You Been' and an untitled track were all recorded between This Is A Fix and Tear the Signs Down, Iwan also posted a number of other demos and live tracks. Shortly after on 20 April, Iwan posted a photo from in the studio working with bassist Rob on a new project. On 6 May 2013, Radio 1 debuted a track by the band Continental Keys, which featured guitarist Frost and was fronted by Tom Jenkins of Straight Lines.

As of 2020, Robin was working as a software developer in Bristol, while Iwan was employed as a trainee accountant in Wick. Both remained open to the idea of the band reuniting.

== Musical style ==
During the band's debut release period of Not Accepted Anywhere they were often categorised as electro-disco-punk rock; at this point they were using more synthesiser keyboards, and had been compared to acts such as Bloc Party, Kaiser Chiefs, and 'thrown in' with the indie rock scene of 2006, the band have even stated that the album was altered in the mixing process "When we were recording the first album there were some really heavy guitars going down but only the clean ones were used" a decision of the record label and producers involved with the album, some of these guitars parts were restored in the 2007 US release of Not Accepted Anywhere when it was re-released and re-mastered, the band at one point were even labelled as Glam rock, which former keyboardist Alex Pennie blamed NME for. The band cite their influences such as Jarcrew, Muse, Blur and The Blood Brothers, and a joint love for bands such as Radiohead and Ash. The band's second album was compared to the sound of Ash's early work by many critics, as well as this the second album is generally listed as having a 'bigger sound' with heavier guitars, less synths, drums and more vocals.

The debut album, Not Accepted Anywhere, lyrically refers to the band's experiences growing up in Cowbridge, while the second album, This Is A Fix, lyrically takes inspiration from politics and news items, except for "Steve McQueen" which lyrically is similar to the tracks on Not Accepted Anywhere and was intended originally as a bridge between the two first albums, as a stand-alone single being originally recorded at the end of 2006, for an early 2007 release. "Monster", "Recover", "In The Mountains" and "Responsible Citizen" lyrically refer to substance abuse and alcohol, the media in "Magazines", the record industry in "Accessories" and "You Shout You Shout You Shout You Shout", the climate in "High Tide on Caroline Street", people the band dislike in "Team Drama and "Seriously... I Hate You Guys", growing up and day-to-day lives in "That's What She Said", "In This World", "Raoul", and "Light Entertainment".

The band instrumentally use various synthesisers to produce many of their sounds, during the recording and touring with the album Not Accepted Anywhere the band's former member Alex Pennie used an Alesis Micron and an Alesis Andromeda during live performances, and in addition to this in studio he used a Roland Juno-106. More recently since Pennie's departure new addition Paul Mullen uses a microKORG whilst James Frost continues to use an Alesis Micron, although fewer of the songs on This Is A Fix use a synthesiser as a predominant instrument. The band uses Sennheiser microphones, 'e 945s' for vocals, 'e 906s' for the guitar cabinets and snare drum, the 'e 604s' for toms, and an 'e 901' on the kick drum.

== Band members ==
=== Final line-up ===
- Robin Hawkins – lead & backing vocals, bass guitar, synthesisers, keyboards, flute (1998–2010)
- James Frost – guitar, synthesisers, keyboards, backing vocals, percussion (1998–2010)
- Iwan Griffiths – drums (1998–2010)
- Paul Mullen – lead & backing vocals, guitar, synthesisers, keyboards (2007–2010)

=== Former member ===
- Alex Pennie – synthesisers, keyboards, percussion, unclean vocals (2003–2007)

== Discography ==
=== Albums ===
- Not Accepted Anywhere (2006)
- This Is a Fix (2008)
- Tear the Signs Down (2010)
