= Alex Pennie =

- Pennie performing in St. Petersburg, 2007

Background information
- Born: Alexander Gregor Pennie; 14 December 1985 (age 40)
- Origin: Cowbridge, Vale of Glamorgan, Wales
- Genres: Indie rock, post-punk revival, alternative rock, hardcore punk, emo
- Instruments: Vocals, synthesizer, keyboards
- Years active: 2004–2015
- Formerly of: The Automatic, Decimals, Goodtime Boys

Alexander Gregor Pennie (born 14 December 1985) is a Welsh musician and a former member of the band the Automatic, where he provided backing vocals in addition to playing the synthesizer and keyboard. He left the Automatic in late 2007, soon forming Goodtime Boys in 2009. They disbanded in 2015.

== Musical career ==
=== The Automatic (2004–2007) ===
Alex Pennie joined The Automatic in 2004 as backing vocalist and keyboard player after the band rebranded themselves The Automatic, after previously being known as White Rabbit. Pennie's unique vocal style and energetic live performances became trademark signatures of The Automatic.

During his time in The Automatic Pennie was featured on Never Mind the Buzzcocks, and with bandmate Robin Hawkins stood in for Zane Lowe on BBC Radio 1. He also took on lead vocal responsibilities on the band's cover of "Gold Digger" by Kanye West and "Epic" by Faith No More. With writing commencing on the band's second album, Pennie was finding being in the band "increasingly unenjoyable", and after completing the Not Accepted Anywhere album tour, he left the band, playing his final date at Get Loaded in the Park on 25 August 2007.

=== Decimals (2008–2009) ===
After leaving the band Pennie moved for a short time to the US where he was supposedly working with a new punk band. However, months later his new project was announced: an indie-electro band Decimals, for which Pennie provides lead vocals. Decimals lasted till late 2009.

=== Goodtime Boys (2009–2015) ===
The Goodtime Boys were founded in 2009, a British punk–emo band, consisting of Alexander (vocals), Casey McHale (drums), Samuel Phipps (guitar), Lewis Johns (guitar) and Leigh McAndrew (bass).

The group released their debut album What's Left to Let Me Go in 2012 on Bridge Nine Records. They previously published two EPs: "Are We Now, Or Have We Ever Been" (2011, Tangled Talk Records) and "Every Landscape" (2012, Bridge Nine Records). In 2013 they made a joint EP with the American emo band Self Defense Family on Palm Reader Records. The second album Rain was released in May 2014.

The group toured Europe with Landscapes, More Than Life, Caspian and Defeater. On 6 January 2015, the group announced its dissolution.

=== Equipment ===
- Roland Juno-106
- Alesis Micron
- Alesis Andromeda

== Discography ==
With The Automatic

- Not Accepted Anywhere - 19 June 2006 - vocals/keys
- Gold Digger, Easy Target, Epic, Time=Money, Jack Daniels, Song6, Trophy Wives, High Tide on Caroline Street, Night Drive
- Steve McQueen and Revolution original recordings

With Yourcodenameis:milo

- Print Is Dead Vol 1 - Trapeze Artist - (2006) - vocals

With Decimals

- Something, Dead End Kids, Shout and Sing, Retreat, Want Want Need, "Fireflies" - Lead vocals
