= Slowdive discography =

- Studio albums: 5
- EPs: 5
- Compilation albums: 3
- Singles: 5
- Music videos: 3

English alternative rock band Slowdive have released five studio albums, three compilation albums, five extended plays, five singles and four music videos.

Slowdive were formed in Reading in late 1989 by vocalist–guitarists Neil Halstead and Rachel Goswell. The duo recruited guitarist Christian Savill, bassist Nick Chaplin and drummer Adrian Sell—who left the band after they signed to Creation Records and before the release of their eponymous EP Slowdive in 1990. Released to critical acclaim from the alternative press, Slowdive was succeeded by a further two EPs, Morningrise and Holding Our Breath (1991), both of which placed in the UK Singles Chart; Holding Our Breath reached number 5 on the UK Independent Singles Chart. The band's debut studio album, Just for a Day, was released in September 1991 to poor reviews, due in part to the British press' growing disillusion with the shoegazing genre. However, Just for a Day was a minor independent success, peaking at number 3 on the Independent Albums Chart and gaining Slowdive a significant following in the United States.

In 1993, under pressure from Creation to produce a commercial-sounding album, Slowdive recruited Brian Eno and began producing new material. Souvlaki was released on 1 June 1993 two weeks after the Outside Your Room EP; both received similarly negative reviews but placed in the mainstream and independent charts, with Souvlaki peaking at number 52 on the UK Albums Chart. A follow-up EP, 5, was released in November 1993 and placed at number 87 on the UK Singles Chart, however following a tour in support of its release drummer Simon Scott left the band due to creative differences.

Slowdive's third studio album, Pygmalion, was released in February 1995. Halstead had dominated the recording process, with the album only featuring minor contributions by Goswell and Ian McCutcheon, the band's new drummer. Reviews for Pygmalion were more favourable than the band's preceding releases and the album peaked at number 108 in the UK Albums Chart. However, Creation were unsatisfied and dropped Slowdive two weeks after its release. Following Slowdive's disbandment in 1995, Halstead, Goswell and McCutcheon formed Mojave 3. The band reformed in 2014, and after touring for several years, released their first new material in over two decades, Slowdive.

== Albums ==
=== Studio albums ===
List of studio albums, with selected chart positions
Title	Details	Peak chart positions					
Title	Details	UK	AUS	BEL (FL)	GER	NLD	US
Just for a Day	Released: 2 September 1991 (UK); Label: Creation (094), SBK (98074); Format: CD, CS, LP	32	—	—	—	—	—
Souvlaki	Released: 1 June 1993 (UK); Label: Creation (139), SBK (88263); Format: CD, CS, LP	51	—	—	—	79	—
Pygmalion	Released: 6 February 1995 (UK); Label: Creation (168); Format: CD, LP	108	—	—	—	—	—
Slowdive	Released: 5 May 2017; Label: Dead Oceans; Format: CD, CS, LP	16	64	29	33	38	50
Everything Is Alive	Released: 1 September 2023; Label: Dead Oceans; Format: CD, CS, LP	6	21	9	7	4	63
"—" denotes a recording that did not chart or was not released in that territory.

=== Compilation albums ===
List of compilation albums
Title	Details
Blue Day	Released: February 1992 (UK); Label: Creation (101); Format: CD, LP
Catch the Breeze	Released: 15 November 2004 (UK); Label: Sanctuary Midline (124); Format: 2×CD
The Shining Breeze: The Slowdive Anthology	Released: 4 May 2010 (UK); Label: Cherry Red (443); Format: 2×CD

== Extended plays ==
List of extended plays, with selected chart positions
Title	Details	Peak chart positions	
Title	Details	UK	UK Indie
Slowdive	Released: 5 November 1990 (UK); Label: Creation (093); Format: 12-inch vinyl, CD	129	—
Morningrise	Released: 18 February 1991 (UK); Label: Creation (098); Format: 12-inch vinyl, CD	83	—
Holding Our Breath	Released: 3 June 1991 (UK); Label: Creation (112); Format: 12-inch vinyl, CD	52	5
Outside Your Room	Released: 17 May 1993 (UK); Label: Creation (119); Format: 12-inch vinyl, CD	69	7
5	Released: 22 November 1993 (UK); Label: Creation (157); Format: 12-inch vinyl, CD	87	10
"—" denotes a recording that did not chart or was not released in that territory.

== Singles ==
List of singles, with selected chart positions
Single	Year	Peak	Album
Single	Year	UK	Album
"Catch the Breeze"	1991	52	Just for a Day
"Beach Song"	1992	—	Non-album single
"Alison"	1994	69	Souvlaki
"Star Roving"	2017	—	Slowdive
"Sugar for the Pill"	2017	—	Slowdive
"No Longer Making Time"	2017	—	Slowdive
"Don't Know Why"	2017	—	Slowdive
"Kisses"	2023	—	Everything Is Alive
"Skin in the Game"	2023	—	Everything Is Alive
"The Slab"	2023	—	Everything Is Alive
"Alife"	2023	—	Everything Is Alive
"—" denotes a recording that did not chart or was not released in that territory.

=== Promotional singles ===
List of promotional singles
Title	Year	Album
"She Calls"/"Leave Them All Behind" (Slowdive/Ride)	1992	Just for a Day/Going Blank Again

== Other charted and certified songs ==
List of other charted songs, with selected chart positions
Title	Year	Peak	Certifications	Album
Title	Year	NZ Hot	Certifications	Album
"When the Sun Hits"	1993	—	BPI: Silver; RMNZ: Gold	Souvlaki
"Shanty"	2023	40		Everything Is Alive
"—" denotes a recording that did not chart or was not released in that territory.

== Music videos ==
List of music videos
Title	Year	Director(s)	Ref.
"Morningrise"	1991	—N/a	—N/a
"Shine"	1991	—N/a	—N/a
"Poetic Frenzy"	1991	—N/a	—N/a
"Catch the Breeze"	1991	—N/a	—N/a
"The Ballad of Sister Sue"	1991	—N/a	—N/a
"Alison" (UK version)	1993	Mike Mason	—N/a
"Alison" (US version)	1994	Mike Mason	
"Star Roving"	2017	Nathan David Smith	—N/a
"Don't Know Why"	2017	Grant Singer	
"kisses"	2023	Noel Paul	—N/a

== Miscellaneous appearances ==
List of appearances on compilation albums and soundtracks
Song(s)	Year	Album	Notes	Ref
"Shine"	1991	Sorted, Snorted and Sported	Originally released on Holding Our Breath and Just for a Day.	
"Ballad of Sister Sue"	1992	All the President's Men: A Creation Compilation	Originally released on Just for a Day	
"Ballad of Sister Sue"	1992	The Best of Bizarre Festival (1987–1992)	Originally released on Just for a Day	
"Catch the Breeze"	1992	Best of Independent^{20}	Originally released on Just for a Day	
"So Tired" "Moussaka Chaos"	1993	Brand New Whispers	Originally released on Outside Your Room.	
"Alison"	1993	Creation Soup 1990–1993	Originally released on Outside Your Room and Souvlaki.	
"Crazy for You"	1994	Creation Records: International Guardians of Rock 'N' Roll	Later released on Pygmalion.	
"Rutti"	1995	Spiral: Sony Music	Originally released on Pygmalion.	
"Some Velvet Morning"	1995	Sharks Patrol These Waters	Originally released on Souvlaki.	
"Blue Skied an' Clear"	1995	Doom Generation: Original Soundtrack	Originally released on Pygmalion.	
"Shine"	1999	Splendor: Original Soundtrack	Originally released on Holding Our Breath and Just for a Day.	
"Slowdive"	2000	Creation Records: International Guardians of Rock 'N' Roll 1983–1999	Originally released on Slowdive.	
"Catch the Breeze"	2003	Feedback to the Future	Originally released on Holding Our Breath and Just for a Day.	
"When the Sun Hits"	2006	Like a Daydream: A Shoegazing Guide	Originally released on Souvlaki.	
"When the Sun Hits"	2009	Sci-Fi Lo-Fi, Vol. 3	Originally released on Souvlaki.	
"Souvlaki Space Station" "Alison"	2010	Upside Down: The Creation Records Story	Originally released on Souvlaki.	
"Slowdive"	2016	Still in a Dream: A Story of Shoegaze	Originally released on Slowdive.	
