= Nick Chaplin =

- Born: 23 December 1970 (age 55); Slough, Berkshire, England
- Origin: Reading, Berkshire, England
- Genres: Shoegaze, dream pop, indie rock
- Occupation: Musician
- Instrument: Bass guitar
- Years active: 1989–1995, 2014–present
- Labels: Creation Records, Dead Oceans

Nick Chaplin (born 23 December 1970) is an English musician best known as the bassist of the shoegaze band Slowdive.

== Early life ==
Chaplin was born in Slough, Berkshire, England.

He did not begin playing bass guitar until the age of 16. Chaplin and bandmate Rachel Goswell were described as "old goths" in their youth, with Chaplin citing the Cure as his favourite band. His bass playing style draws heavily from Simon Gallup of the Cure and Peter Hook of Joy Division and New Order, who Goswell describes as Chaplin's "bass guitar gods".

== Career ==
=== Pre-Slowdive ===
Before joining Slowdive, Chaplin played in the short-lived indie pop group the Pumpkin Fairies alongside future Slowdive drummer Adrian Sell and others.

=== Slowdive ===
Chaplin joined Slowdive in late 1989 alongside Neil Halstead (vocals/guitar), Rachel Goswell (vocals/guitar), and Christian Savill (guitar), with Adrian Sell initially on drums.

He performed on all of the band's recordings during their original 1989–1995 era, including the EPs Slowdive (1990), Holding Our Breath (1991), and the studio albums Just for a Day (1991), Souvlaki (1993), and Pygmalion (1995), all released on Creation Records.

Following the band's breakup in 1995, Chaplin stepped away from music for nearly two decades, focusing on family life. During this period, he rode his bike extensively.

Slowdive reunited in 2014 (with the original lineup, including Chaplin) for a performance at Primavera Sound, which led to extensive world touring, the self-titled album Slowdive (2017), and the follow-up everything is alive (2023), both released on Dead Oceans. Chaplin has remained the band's bassist throughout the reunion era.

=== Collaborations ===
Unlike several of his bandmates who have pursued side projects (such as Christian Savill in Beachy Head, Rachel Goswell in The Soft Cavalry, Neil Halstead in solo work and Mojave 3, and Simon Scott in ambient recordings), Chaplin has not released any independent material, formed side bands, or made guest appearances on other artists' records. His discography and collaborations remain exclusively with Slowdive.

== Personal life ==
Chaplin lives in Berkshire with his family.

He is a keen cyclist who enjoys road biking, having mentioned riding his bike extensively during the band's long hiatus and after tours. This interest parallels that of his musical idol Simon Gallup, who is also a well-known cycling enthusiast.

== Discography ==
with Slowdive

- Just for a Day (1991)
- Souvlaki (1993)
- Pygmalion (1995)
- Slowdive (2017)
- Everything Is Alive (2023)
