= Simon Scott (drummer) =

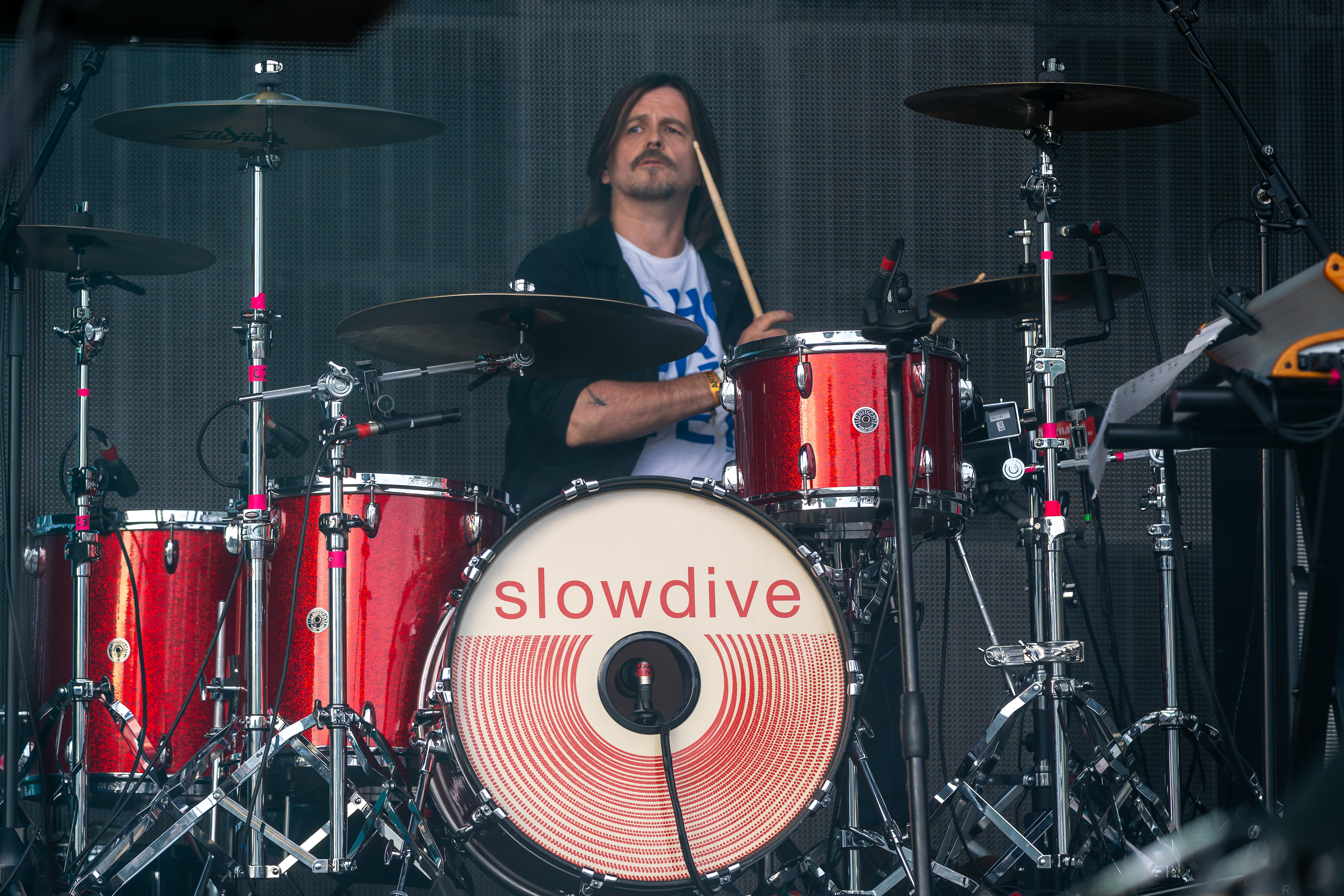
- Scott with Slowdive at Wide Awake Festival 2024

Background information
- Born: 3 March 1971 (age 55); Cambridge, England
- Genres: Shoegaze; dream pop; post-rock; electronica; indie rock
- Instruments: Drums; percussion; guitar; synthesizer; vocals
- Years active: 1988–present
- Labels: Touch; Creation; Club AC30; Miasmah; 12k; Kompakt; KESHHHHHH
- Member of: Slowdive
- Formerly of: Lowgold; The Charlottes
- Website: simonscott.org

Simon Scott (born 3 March 1971) is an English musician, mastering engineer and sound artist, best known as the drummer in Slowdive, the multi-instrumentalist and leader of Three Quarter Skies, and formerly of Lowgold and The Charlottes. He also fronted Inner Sleeve/Televise, and has released ambient music as a solo artist.

== Career ==
Born in Cambridge, Scott first started drumming with female fronted Huntingdon band The Charlottes in 1987 at the age of 16, having recorded two studio tracks a year earlier as part of Honey Chainsaw. He left the Charlottes in 1990 to replace drummer Neil Carter in Slowdive who had supported them in London at The White Horse in Hampstead. He played on albums Just for a Day and Souvlaki, which was voted in The Guardian as "One of the top 50 albums to hear before you die" in 2007. Scott left the band after 5 EP was released in early 1994, prior to the band working on their third album Pygmalion, but rejoined in 2014 when they announced their reformation.

Scott formed and fronted Inner Sleeve in 1997 who released two singles in 1998 and an album Looking Up in 1999, all on the Fierce Panda label.

In 1999, Scott split Inner Sleeve up to join Lowgold following the departure of original drummer Paul Mayes, appeared on one track on the band's debut album Just Backward of Square and toured it extensively (supporting Coldplay and Grandaddy) with the band. He left the band in 2002 after the band ran into financial problems following the collapse of Nude Records. Demos recorded prior to the collapse of Nude and his departure were later released on the compilation Keep Music Miserable including the track ″Time Reclaims All Frontiers″, which was premiered at Reading Festival.

Scott then reformed Inner Sleeve as Televise with new musicians and signed to London record label Club AC30. He has also played in the bands The Sight Below, Seavault (on Morr Music), Chapterhouse and Conformists (with Jasper TX).

In 2006, Scott established an electronic experimental record label KESHHHHHH Recordings, working as a musician and sound artist from his Cambridge recording studio and was remixed on an album called 88 Tapes by Lawrence English, Sawako, Moskitoo, Greg Davis, Benoit Pioulard, Christopher Bissonnette, Mark Templeton, and many more.

2009 saw the release of Scott's debut solo album, Navigare on Miasmah Records. Reviews called it a "Tour-De-Force" and UK music website Boomkat said that the album "transcends the usual parameters of drone music".

In 2010, Scott released the limited 7" "Depart, Repeat". A second album called Bunny on Miasmah was released on 7 October 2011. Scott also performed at Seattle festival Decibel the same year.

The album Below Sea Level was released on 12k in May 2012 and was accompanied by an 80-page journal written whist recording in the sunken areas of The Fens in East Anglia where the album is conceptually based.

Scott occasionally performs live with The Sight Below and co-wrote/co-produced three tracks on the second album It All Falls Apart released in April 2010 on Ghostly International. In January 2012 Kompakt released Pop Ambient 2012 which featured Scott's track "For Martha" and also Pop Ambient 2014 includes his track ″Für Betty″. Scott also drums and co-writes on acoustic guitarist James Blackshaw's album Fantomas: Le Faux Magistrat on Tompkins Square released July 2014 and drums on Blackshaw's 2015 album Summoning Suns.

Slowdive reformed in January 2014, toured globally and began recording a fourth album that was released to critical acclaim in 2017.

In 2015 Scott's Below Sea Level was re-released by UK label/Arts organisation Touch Music, followed in 2019 by his 'Soundings' album for the label.

In December 2020, Scott released "Apart" on 12k.

In September 2023, Scott debuted Three Quarter Skies with the single On Fire on Sonic Cathedral and followed up with an EP, Universal Flames, in October 2023. The debut album Fade In was released in September 2024.

In May 2026, Scott was awarded a PhD from University of the Arts London for his dissertation The Multiphonic Fens.

== Solo discography ==
- Navigare (Miasmah) – October 2009
- Nivalis 3" CD (Secret Furry Hole) – January 2010
- Silenne CD (Slaapwel) – August 2010
- Conformists vinyl LP film soundtrack with Dag Rosenqvist (Low Point) – October 2010
- Depart, Repeat 7" (Sonic Pieces) – February 2011
- Bunny (Miasmah) – 7 October 2011
- Pop Ambient 2012 (Kompakt) – 29 January 2012
- Below Sea Level (12k) – 29 May 2012
- Pop Ambient 2014 (Kompakt) – 27 January 2014
- Below Sea Level Touch – 6 March 2015
- Insomni (Ash International) – 25 September 2015
- FloodLines (Touch) – 2016
- Soundings (Touch) – 2019
- Migrations (Touch) – 2020
- Apart (12k) – 2020
- Long Drove (Room40) – 20 January 2023

== Three Quarter Skies discography ==
- On Fire single (Sonic Cathedral) – September 2023
- Universal Flames EP (Sonic Cathedral) – October 2023
- Holy Water split 7" single w/deary "2000 Miles" (Sonic Cathedral) – December 2023
- On Fire single (Sonic Cathedral) – September 2023
- Crows single (Sonic Cathedral) – June 2024
- Leave a Light On single (Sonic Cathedral) – July 2024
- Fade In CD/LP (Sonic Cathedral) – September 2024
- Superwoman / On Fire (Sonic Boom Remix) single (Sonic Cathedral) – November 2024
- Leave a Light On single (Sonic Cathedral) – July 2024
- Crows (Drab Majesty) remix single (Sonic Cathedral) – April 2025
- On Fire EP (Sonic Cathedral) – June 2025
