= Sonic Cathedral =

British independent record label

- Founded: 2004; 22 years ago
- Founder: Nathaniel Cramp
- Distributor: Cargo Records
- Genre: Shoegaze, dream pop
- Country of origin: United Kingdom
- Location: London
- Official website: https://soniccathedral.co.uk

Sonic Cathedral is a British independent record label with a focus on shoegaze.

== History ==
Originally started as a club night by ex-NME journalist Nathaniel Cramp in October 2004, it became a record label in 2006 after offering to put out a 7" single for Mark Gardener of Ride.

The first edition of the club night was held at The Legion on Old Street, in East London, and featured a DJ set by The Telescopes and a live performance by The Radio Dept.

Over the first few years as a label it continued to just put out 7" records, by bands such as School of Seven Bells, Maps, and M83. In 2009 these were compiled on Cathedral Classics Volume 1. That year the label released its first album, the UK edition of Unknown Colors by Swedish band Sad Day For Puppets.

In 2013 the label released a solo mini-album by Dean Wareham (of Galaxie 500, Luna, and Dean & Britta), titled Emancipated Hearts, followed by a self-titled full-length album in 2014.

On 18 May 2014, a reformed Slowdive performed a surprise live set at the label's 10th anniversary concert at Hoxton Square Bar & Kitchen.

In October 2020 the label released a solo album by Andy Bell of Ride, named The View From Halfway Down. This was followed by a second in 2022, Flicker.

In October 2023 the label released Pearlies, the debut solo album of Emma Anderson of Lush.

In February 2024 it released the first full-length album by London band Whitelands, Night-Bound Eyes Are Blind to the Day. In June 2024 NME called it one of the best debut albums of the year so far.

In 2024 Sonic Cathedral celebrated its 20th anniversary with four concerts in London, featuring artists such as Slowdive, Ride, and A Place to Bury Strangers.
