= Slowdive (album) =

Studio album by Slowdive
- Released: 5 May 2017
- Studios: Courtyard (Sutton Courtenay); Sound Gallery (Exeter); The White House (Kewstoke); The Farm 2 (St Merryn); Zigzag (Hilton)
- Genres: Shoegaze; dream pop
- Length: 46:01
- Label: Dead Oceans
- Producer: Neil Halstead

Slowdive chronology
Catch the Breeze (2004)	Slowdive (2017)	Everything Is Alive (2023)

Singles from Slowdive
- 1. "Star Roving" Released: 12 January 2017; 2. "Sugar for the Pill" Released: 28 March 2017

Slowdive is the fourth studio album by English rock band Slowdive. It was released on 5 May 2017 by the record label Dead Oceans. It was Slowdive's first studio album in 22 years, following Pygmalion (1995), as well as their first album since Souvlaki (1993) to feature drummer Simon Scott as a member.

Slowdive was preceded by the singles "Star Roving", released on 12 January 2017, and "Sugar for the Pill", released on 28 March 2017.

The album artwork is a still image from avant-garde cut-out animation film, Heaven and Earth Magic (1962), by beatnik artist and polymath Harry Smith.

== Critical reception ==
Professional ratings
Aggregate scores
Source	Rating
AnyDecentMusic?	8.1/10
Metacritic	82/100
Review scores
Source	Rating
AllMusic	3.5/5 stars
The A.V. Club	B
Consequence	A−
Financial Times	4/5 stars
The Guardian	4/5 stars
Mojo	4/5 stars
The Observer	4/5 stars
Pitchfork	8.6/10
The Times	4/5 stars
Uncut	8/10

Slowdive received acclaim from music critics. At Metacritic, which assigns a normalised rating out of 100 to reviews from mainstream publications, the album received an average score of 82, based on 30 reviews.

TJ Kliebhan of Consequence found that Slowdive had "delivered a fresh dream-pop sound that is still uniquely Slowdive", concluding that "Slowdive delivers nearly everything their fans desire in a return: familiarity, innovation, and vast atmospheres to get lost in." The Skinny's Duncan Harman said that the album "represents an awareness of legacy, and the importance of not pissing all over it; to that extent, it's an essential addition to canon." Drowned in Sound reviewer Dom Gourlay called Slowdive a "majestic return that doesn't just fill in the gaps, but points unflinchingly towards future horizons." Sean T. Collins of Pitchfork said that the album "offers maximum-volume shoegaze too, better than the band ever has before", and Cam Lindsay of Exclaim! wrote that it "certainly was a long wait, but finally Slowdive have given us the album that we have been dreaming about for the last 22 years."

In October 2025, Paste ranked the album at number 237 on their "250 Greatest Albums of the 21st Century So Far" list, writing: "Every song is breathtaking, from the soaring opener "Slomo" to the melancholic "Sugar For the Pill". While it’s not as risky and experimental as Pygmalion, it thrives in its simplicity, with a precise attention to detail where each instrumentation fills its purpose to create Slowdive’s most atmospheric record yet."

=== Accolades ===
Accolades for Slowdive
Publication	Accolade	Rank	Ref.
Crack Magazine	The 100 Best Albums of 2017	13	
Exclaim	Top 20 Pop & Rock Albums of 2017	3	
Pitchfork	The 50 Best Albums of 2017	30	
Pitchfork	The 20 Best Rock Albums of 2017	8	
Stereogum	The 50 Best Albums of 2017	15	
A2IM Libera Awards 2018	Album of the Year 2018	1	
Opinion Police	The Best Song of the 2010s (Star Roving)	1	

== Track listing ==
Slowdive track listing
No.	Title	Writer(s)	Length
1.	"Slomo"	Neil Halstead; Christian Savill; Nick Chaplin; Rachel Goswell; Simon Scott	6:53
2.	"Star Roving"	Halstead	5:39
3.	"Don't Know Why"	Halstead	4:37
4.	"Sugar for the Pill"	Halstead; Chaplin	4:31
5.	"Everyone Knows"	Halstead	4:22
6.	"No Longer Making Time"	Halstead	5:48
7.	"Go Get It"	Halstead; Savill; Chaplin; Goswell; Scott	6:10
8.	"Falling Ashes"	Halstead; Scott	8:01
Total length:			46:01

Japanese edition bonus track
No.	Title	Writer(s)	Length
9.	"30th June"	Halstead; Savill; Goswell	7:27
Total length:			53:25

== Personnel ==
Credits are adapted from the album's liner notes.

Slowdive

- Neil Halstead – vocals, guitars, keyboards, editing, production
- Rachel Goswell – vocals
- Christian Savill – guitars
- Nick Chaplin – bass guitar
- Simon Scott – drums, guitar, electronics

Additional personnel

- Ian Davenport – engineering
- Duncan Chave – additional engineering
- Martin Nichols – additional engineering
- Gareth Stuart – additional engineering
- Steve Clarke – additional vocal engineering
- Chris Coady – mixing
- Sarah Tudzin – mixing (assistant)
- Heba Kadry – mastering
- Josh Bonati – vinyl cut
- Harry Smith – cover art (from Heaven and Earth Magic)
- Ingrid Pop – inner sleeve photography, art direction

== Charts ==
Chart performance for Slowdive
Chart (2017)	Peak position
Australian Albums (ARIA)	64
Belgian Albums (Ultratop Flanders)	29
Belgian Albums (Ultratop Wallonia)	53
Canadian Albums (Billboard)	72
Dutch Albums (Album Top 100)	38
Finnish Albums (Suomen virallinen lista)	49
French Albums (SNEP)	122
German Albums (Offizielle Top 100)	33
Irish Albums (IRMA)	45
Japanese Albums (Oricon)	103
New Zealand Heatseekers Albums (RMNZ)	7
Portuguese Albums (AFP)	26
Scottish Albums (Official Charts)	12
Swedish Albums (Sverigetopplistan)	36
Swiss Albums (Schweizer Hitparade)	79
UK Albums (Official Charts)	16
UK Independent Albums (Official Charts)	4
US Billboard 200	50
US Independent Albums (Billboard)	3
US Top Alternative Albums (Billboard)	5
US Top Rock Albums (Billboard)	11
