= Heaven and Earth Magic =

1962 film by Harry Everett Smith

- Film still from Heaven and Earth Magic
- Directed by: Harry Everett Smith
- Produced by: Harry Everett Smith
- Edited by: Harry Everett Smith
- Distributed by: Mystic Fire Video
- Release date: January 1, 1962 (United States)
- Running time: 66 minutes
- Country: United States
- Language: English

Heaven and Earth Magic (also known as Number 12, The Magic Feature, or Heaven and Earth Magic Feature) is a 1962 American cutout animated film directed by visual artist, filmmaker, and mystic Harry Everett Smith. Jonas Mekas gave the film the title Heaven and Earth Magic in 1965.

The independent film depicts, among various surrealist images and scenes, a heroine entering and exploring Heaven, and then returning to planet Earth. According to Smith, the return to Earth involves a depiction of the London sewer system during the Edwardian era.

== Plot ==
Smith is recorded as having given the following exposition of Heaven and Earth Magic: "The first part depicts the heroine's toothache consequent to the loss of a valuable watermelon, her dentistry and transportation to heaven. Next follows an elaborate exposition of the heavenly land in terms of Israel, Montreal and the second part depicts the return to earth from being eaten by Max Müller on the day Edward the Seventh dedicated the Great Sewer of London."

== Production ==
The film used cut-outs created from 19th-century catalogues, showing people, animals, plants and inanimate objects. They are presented in contrast to a black background.

The film is accompanied by a musique concrète score prominently featuring the sounds of flowing water, and ticking and chiming clocks, as well as various other sounds from sound effect records. John Waters of The Independent described it as "the sort of soundtrack you could put together in a hotel room", noting that "Smith lived at the Chelsea Hotel, rent unpaid, for much of that time" and that it was likely created in a visionary manner alike the film's creation.

== Reception and legacy ==
Fred Camper from Chicago Reader praised the film's artistic style, calling it "a mysterious world of alchemical transformations in which objects suggest a multitude of possibilities." Time Out Magazine offered the film similar praise, comparing it to the works of Max Ernst and Georges Méliès.

It is listed in the film reference book 1001 Movies You Must See Before You Die, noting the film as Smith's magnum opus, and describing it as "incomplete, deeply idiosyncratic, rearranged from materials taken largely from an earlier period—a Victorian-era catalogue—it is explicitly "folk" in nature." Writing in 1999 for The Independent, Waters noted that "Smith's stop-frame animations look remarkably similar to Terry Gilliam's Monty Python animations made a few years later".

A still from the film, showing a silhouetted side profile of a face, was used as the album art for the English band Slowdive’s 2017 self-titled album.

== See also ==
- Alchemy
- Cutout animation
- Hermetic Qabalah
- List of animated feature films
- List of stop-motion films
- Surreal humour

== Sources ==
=== Books ===
- Marcus, Greil (April 26, 2011). The Old, Weird America: The World of Bob Dylan's Basement Tapes. Picador. ISBN 978-1-4299-6158-5.
- Steven Jay Schneider (2013). 1001 Movies You Must See Before You Die. Barron's. ISBN 978-0-7641-6613-6.

=== Websites ===
- Camper, Fred (October 26, 1985). "Heaven and Earth Magic". ChicagoReader.com. The Chicago Reader.
- "Heaven and Earth Magic 1962, directed by Harry Smith". TimeOut.com. Time Out Magazine. March 13, 2014. Archived from the original on April 17, 2014.
