= Lowgold =

English indie rock band

Background information
- Origin: St Albans, England
- Genre: Indie rock
- Years active: 1997–2009
- Labels: Nude Records; Sanctuary Records; Dedted Records; Goldhawk Recordings
- Past members: Darren Ford; Dan Symons; Miles Willey; Simon Scott; Paul Mayes (Aka 'Custard')
- Website: www.lowgold.co.uk

Lowgold were an English indie rock band formed in 1997 in St Albans, comprising vocalist and rhythm guitarist Darren Ford, lead guitarist Dan Symons and bassist Miles Willey.

The band originally claimed that the word "lowgold" was derived from a Nordic word, directly translated as "of hidden worth". However the band later admitted that it is just a word that Ford made up.

== History ==
Army child Darren Lee Ford, born in Tidworth, Hampshire, spent much of his childhood travelling around Northern Ireland, Germany and England, where his father was stationed before attending boarding school near Dover and spent the previous 10 years before forming Lowgold on the dole and drumming in numerous bands such as The Knievels with his older brother Gary and Shinecello with Miles Willey on guitar as well as touring the stand-up comedy circuit for eight months. Fed up of backing others, he decided to begin singing his songs himself and recorded home demos on a four-track portastudio with friend Dan Symons, from Poole, Dorset, and sent them off to several record labels. Nude Records responded that they were interested, and wanted to hear more songs and see the band live. When the duo informed Nude that there wasn't actually a band, the label suggested that needed to form one. They enlisted Miles Willey, from Bromley, Kent, who in addition to being a former bandmate and current housemate of Ford was an old university friend of Symons' on bass, and drafted in Paul Mayes on drums. Symons and Miles had also previously been in rival bands at University of Hertfordshire. Symons was a member of Quadpeace, who had previously toured with Shinecello and Willey had been a member of Fetus Eaters.

Nude Records signed the band in late 1998 after watching one rehearsal. The band then set about recording their debut album with American producer Tony Lash. During the initial sessions at Chipping Norton Recording Studios it was agreed that Paul's heavier drumming style didn't fit Lowgold so he left the band. Along with Ford, Lash took over drum duties for the album, with former Slowdive drummer Simon Scott joining the band after the main album sessions, appearing on "Counterfeit", a track recorded with Dave Eringa.

The band were then left in a state of limbo and barely able to support themselves as any releases were temporarily shelved due to Nude being in financial difficulties.

The band were finally able to release their debut single "The 108" EP in July 2000, which was voted Single of the Week in both the NME and Melody Maker and toured extensively, including dates with Grandaddy and Doves and a major support tour with Coldplay in October 2000.

The band released Just Backward of Square in February 2001, shifting 40,000 copies in the UK and breaking into the Top 40. The band then ran into further problems with their label, who were repeatedly withholding wages from the band. Due to ongoing financial problems, the label were also increasingly reluctant to fund any further touring to promote the album and the band struggled to be able to afford to play Reading Festival and what turned out to be the band's last gig for two years at a Tim Buckley tribute night at the Royal Festival in London in September 2001.

In December 2001, Nude and its publishing arm Bare Tunes went into voluntary liquidation due to financial debt, and failed to inform their acts of their intention to do so. The label had lost their distribution deal with Sony and a last-minute new deal with PIAS fell through. Willey later claimed that the label wasted any profit it made from Suede on promoting Ultrasound, who split in 1999 and accused the label of being dishonest and leaving the band up to their "necks in financial shit". Whilst the label's biggest act Suede were re-signed to Nude's parent label Sony (who had been looking after the band's affairs prior to Nude folding), many of the label's smaller acts, including Lowgold, were left significant debt and no record label.

Following the collapse of Nude, the band found that major labels were reluctant to re-sign the band, as Ford admitted the band were now "damaged goods - no one wants to buy a suit someone has died in". The band were £58,000 in debt and took take day jobs in order to pay off debts. The band later revealed that Lowgold was set up as a partnership on the recommendation of Nude owner Saul Galpern, as opposed to a limited company and therefore all the partners were personally liable for any debts. The label had approved promotion and touring costs, with no way of funding them. Scott, who joined the band after they had signed to Nude, was not a partner and was technically classed as an employee of the band therefore not liable for any of the bad debt and subsequently quit the band.

In December 2002, following showcase gigs with the band's manager and former Wonder Stuff drummer Martin Gilks on drums (and who described the band as "more punk than most of the West Coast Middle Class Musos put together… and they have better songs"), the band signed to Sanctuary Records, home to Morrissey and Spiritualized, for a one-album deal plus an option for a second, and set about recording a new album with first album producer Tony Lash as a trio, with Lash on drums. The band headed to the US and recorded the album at Supernatural Sound Recording Studio in Oregon and Lash's home studio. The band then enlisted drummer Rob Lee for live dates. The album Welcome To Winners was released in October 2003, named as Symons’ cousin's house backed onto Winnersh railway station where someone had crossed out the H on the "Welcome To Winnersh" sign. The band embarked on a UK tour in support of the album, which saw them supported by an up-and-coming Keane at Manchester Roadhouse. The band's comeback single "We Don't Have Much Time" wasn't promoted and was then cancelled at the last minute, despite it having already having been distributed to record shops. The album received little promotion and the follow-up single "The Same Way" failed to get any radio play in a musical landscape of teen pop and nu metal, the band felt neglected by Sanctuary and the label didn't take up the option for a follow-up. On the band's time with Sanctuary, Ford commented it was "like watching a misunderstood fat kid swim too far out to sea. Sanctuary decided Tubby wasn't worth saving and the lifeboat stayed in the harbour".

Symons along with his cousin Jon Gilbert, who had helped save the band from bankruptcy, formed independent record label Dedtedrecords to release the anthology set Keep Music Miserable in October 2005, which saw the band release everything they had recorded. As far as the band were concerned, they were going nowhere and the band was unable to function.

Ford continued to write, but had no intention of letting anyone else hear anything until the death of manager Martin Gilks in April 2006 which saw the band reunite to play at his funeral. After Symons heard the demos Ford had recorded, the band started demoing new material in early 2007 and released Promise Lands, their fourth studio album on 31 March 2008 through Goldhawk Recordings/Cooking Vinyl. Ford described the album as "a very sad record. There are bits of it that are quite raw, bits of it that are quite difficult to listen to for the same reason they were quite hard to write. It’s probably the most personal thing that we’ve done". The band undertook a short UK tour in March/April 2008 to promote the album. A second short tour planned for later in the year was cancelled.

Addressing questions regarding the tour cancellation and prolonged radio silence, in August 2009 the band stated in a social media post that they were busy raising children, and also claimed that they intended to continue. However, that was to be the last communication from the band and as of 2025 they have yet to release new material or perform live again.

In 2021, the band's debut EP and first 2 albums were re-issued to streaming and download websites.

== Post-split ==
Willey played with Brighton-based Good Morning, Captain and instrumental band -a+M who morphed into Lamp and are signed to independent label Lancashire and Somerset. He then worked as a Doctoral College manager at University of Brighton.

Symons went on to forge a career in music marketing, working at Sanctuary, Rough Trade Records as well as setting up his own company Band2Market.

Ford was the author of a number of now defunct satirical blogs, including Misanthrobs, I am Bono (you're not), World Of Worksports and Dick Cheney - The Retirement Years. He also wrote articles for Sabotage Times and surrealfootball.com. In 2013, Ford uploaded a solo demo of a new song "Back To Zero" on SoundCloud.

Ford now works as a screenwriter. His self-written bio states that "Darren used to write songs for a living. He now writes screenplays in Carmarthenshire". In 2024, Ford was one of several screenwriters who were selected to participate in the BBC Voices group for Wales

== Discography ==
=== Albums ===
- Just Backward of Square (12 February 2001) - UK No. 33
- Welcome to Winners (6 October 2003)
- Keep Music Miserable (10 October 2005)
- Promise Lands (31 March 2008)

=== Singles and EPs ===
- "The 108 EP" (24 July 2000)
- "Beauty Dies Young" (18 September 2000) - UK No. 67
- "Mercury" (29 January 2001) - UK No. 48
- "Counterfeit" (30 April 2001) - UK No. 52
- "Beauty Dies Young" (Re-Recording) (27 August 2001) - UK No. 40
- "We Don't Have Much Time" (2003)
- "The Same Way" (2003)
- "Burning Embers" (2008)
