= Pale Silver & Shiny Gold =

Studio album by Sad Day for Puppets
- Released: 1 September 2010
- Genre: Shoegazing
- Length: 37:33
- Label: HaHa Fonogram
- Producer: Martin Källholm; Alex Svenson-Metés

Sad Day for Puppets chronology
Unknown Colors (2008)	Pale Silver & Shiny Gold (2010)	Come Closer (2013)

Pale Silver & Shiny Gold is the second album from Swedish quintet Sad Day for Puppets, released on 1 September 2010. "Sorrow, Sorrow" preceded the album as a single, and was chosen as the single of the week by Drowned in Sound.

== Critical reception ==
The album received generally positive reviews. The Line of Best Fit said that the "ethereal charms" of their first album "now swirl with a cyclonic velocity that when combined with richer and fuller production make their early recordings feel like demos in comparison. From the opening doubled-barrelled vocal assault of the Eklund sisters on 'Sorrow, Sorrow' through to the closing blare of 'Tingle in my Hand', [the album] grabs you by the scruff of the neck and propels your through its curios like a runaway ghost train." Arbetarbladet complimented the band for incorporating elements of 1970s rock, specifically from groups like Thin Lizzy, into their music while describing Martin Källholm as a "competent songwriter" and highlighting Anna Eklund's vocals. Sydsvenskan commented: "The tunes are nice, but where are the messy guitars? For anyone who asked that question about Teenage Fanclub's comeback record, the answer may be that the rattling guitars ended up here, on Sad Day for Puppets' second album."

Gaffa gave a mixed review, rating the album three stars out of six and saying that the sound is "somehow so familiar that it becomes jarring. It therefore feels nice when the consistently driving and ringing electric guitars are accompanied by an unexpected flute in one of the songs. The bottomless rocky guitars intrude on what is basically a catchy pop album, and pulls [my] rating down. I would like to change the settings on Sad Day for Puppet's amplifier, plug in some unusual power pedals, record the guitar backwards, do something that moves the sound away from what feels too 'classic' and done."

== Track listing ==
All songs written and composed by Martin Källholm.

1. "Sorrow, Sorrow" – 3:00
2. "Such a Waste" – 4:22
3. "Anne Says, Pt. II" – 3:12
4. "Shadows" – 3:40
5. "Beads" – 3:11
6. "Monster & the Beast" – 5:12
7. "Touch" – 3:12
8. "Fuzzy Feather" – 3:01
9. "First Time" – 2:52
10. "Tingle in my Hand" – 5:45

== Personnel ==
Credits adapted from the liner notes of Pale Silver & Shiny Gold.

- Anna Eklund – vocals
- Martin Källholm – songwriter, guitar, producer
- Alex Svenson-Metés – background vocals, bass, keyboards, producer, mixing
- Marcus Sandgren – lead guitar
- Micael Back – background vocals, drums

Additional personnel:

- Annika Eklund – background vocals
- Hannes Fornander – background vocals
- Lucy Johnston – photography, artwork
- Henrik Lindquist - sdfp logo
- Jan Boleslav Sjöberg – illustration
- Andreas Tilliander – mastering
