= Tony Lash =

- Born
- Origin: United States
- Genres: Rock; alternative rock; indie rock
- Occupations: Musician; music producer
- Instruments: Drums; guitar; flute; electric piano
- Years active: 1990s–present
- Formerly of: Heatmiser, Sunset Valley, Private Player

Tony Lash is an American musician and music producer, most notable as a founding member of Heatmiser as the band's drummer. He played with Elliott Smith, in the high school band. Lash played the flute; Smith, the clarinet.

He played drums in Smith's band Stranger Than Fiction during high school. After leaving Heatmiser, Lash played drums in the Portland, Oregon bands Sunset Valley and Private Player. He engineered and played electric piano on the No. 2 song "Never Felt Better" (from No Memory). Lash has played drums, guitar, and various other instruments on recordings he has produced.

As a producer and engineer, Lash has worked with The Dandy Warhols, Eric Matthews and the English band Lowgold, with whom he has produced and played drums on two albums, Just Backward of Square, Welcome To Winners and mastered their third studio album Promise Lands.

In 2024, Lash was inducted into the Oregon Music Hall of Fame for his production work.
