= Blue Day =

Compilation album by Slowdive
- Released: 1992
- Recorded: The White House Studio
- Genre: Dream pop; shoegaze
- Label: Creation Records
- Producer: Martin Nichols

Slowdive chronology
Just for a Day (1991)	Blue Day (1992)	Outside Your Room (1993)

Professional ratings
Review scores
Source	Rating
AllMusic	4/5 stars
Trouser Press	generally favourable

Blue Day is a compilation album by English shoegaze band Slowdive. It was released in 1992 on Creation Records and compiled the first three Slowdive EPs: Slowdive (missing the track "Avalyn II"), Morningrise (in its entirety), and Holding Our Breath (missing the Syd Barrett cover "Golden Hair" as well as "Catch the Breeze", which appeared on their first full-length Just for a Day). It was subsequently made available in the US and the UK with the initial 1000 copies of "Souvlaki" as part of a limited edition double CD.

== Track listing ==
1. "Slowdive" – (5:15)
2. "Avalyn 1" – (4:51)
3. "Morningrise" – (4:19)
4. "She Calls" – (5:38)
5. "Losing Today" – (5:00)
6. "Shine" – (5:21)
7. "Albatross" – (5:14)
