= Welcome to Winners =

Welcome To Winners

Studio album by Lowgold
- Released: 6 October 2003
- Recorded: Supernatural Sound Recording Studio, Oregon City, Oregon, USA; Mandible Studio, Portland, Oregon, USA
- Genre: Rock
- Label: Sanctuary Records Group
- Producer: Tony Lash

Lowgold chronology
| Just Backward of Square (2001) | Welcome To Winners (2003) | Keep Music Miserable (2005) |

Professional ratings
Review scores
| Source | Rating |
|---|---|
| Uncut | 3/5 stars |

Welcome To Winners is the second album by the English band Lowgold, released in 2003.

The album was again produced by former Elliott Smith associate Tony Lash and two singles were lifted from the album. The Times described the album as a "minor masterpiece".

== Track listing ==
All songs written by Darren Lee Ford except "Quiet Times", "Famous Last Words" and "Save Yourself" written by Dan Symons.

1. "Quiet Times"
2. "We Don't Have Much Time"
3. "The Same Way"
4. "Let Me Into Yours"
5. "Means To An End"
6. "Just A Ride"
7. "Keep Your Gun Dry"
8. "Famous Last Words"
9. "Clear The Skies"
10. "Fade Down"
11. "Save Yourself"

== UK singles ==
1. "We Don't Have Much Time" (2003)
2. "The Same Way" (2003)

== Personnel ==
- Tony Lash – producer, drums
- Darren Ford – vocals, guitar, drums
- Dan Symons – guitar
- Miles Willey – bass guitar
