= The Charlottes =

The Charlottes were a female fronted indie pop and shoegaze band from Huntingdon, Cambridgeshire in England, formed in 1988.

== History ==
The band formed in 1988, initially as The Giant Polar Bears, comprising Petra Roddis (vocals), Graham Gargiulo (guitar), David Fletcher (bass), and Simon Scott (drums). After a debut single "Are You Happy Now?" in 1988, their debut album, Love Happy, was issued by The Subway Organization the following year.

They were a favourite band of John Peel, for whom they recorded a radio session in 1989.

The band then signed to the Cherry Red label. In 1990, drummer Simon Scott left to join Slowdive and the band split up after releasing a second album, Things Come Apart, in 1990 and now records as a solo artist. Gargiulo later formed a new band, Barefoot Contessa.

== Discography ==
=== Singles and EP ===
- "Are You Happy Now?" (1988) Molesworth
- Love in the Emptiness EP (1990) Subway
- "Liar" (1990) Cherry Red

=== Albums ===
- Love Happy (1989) Subway
- Things Come Apart (1991) Cherry Red
- Liar: The Best Of The Charlottes (2006) Cherry Red
