= Whitelands =

Shoegaze band from London, England

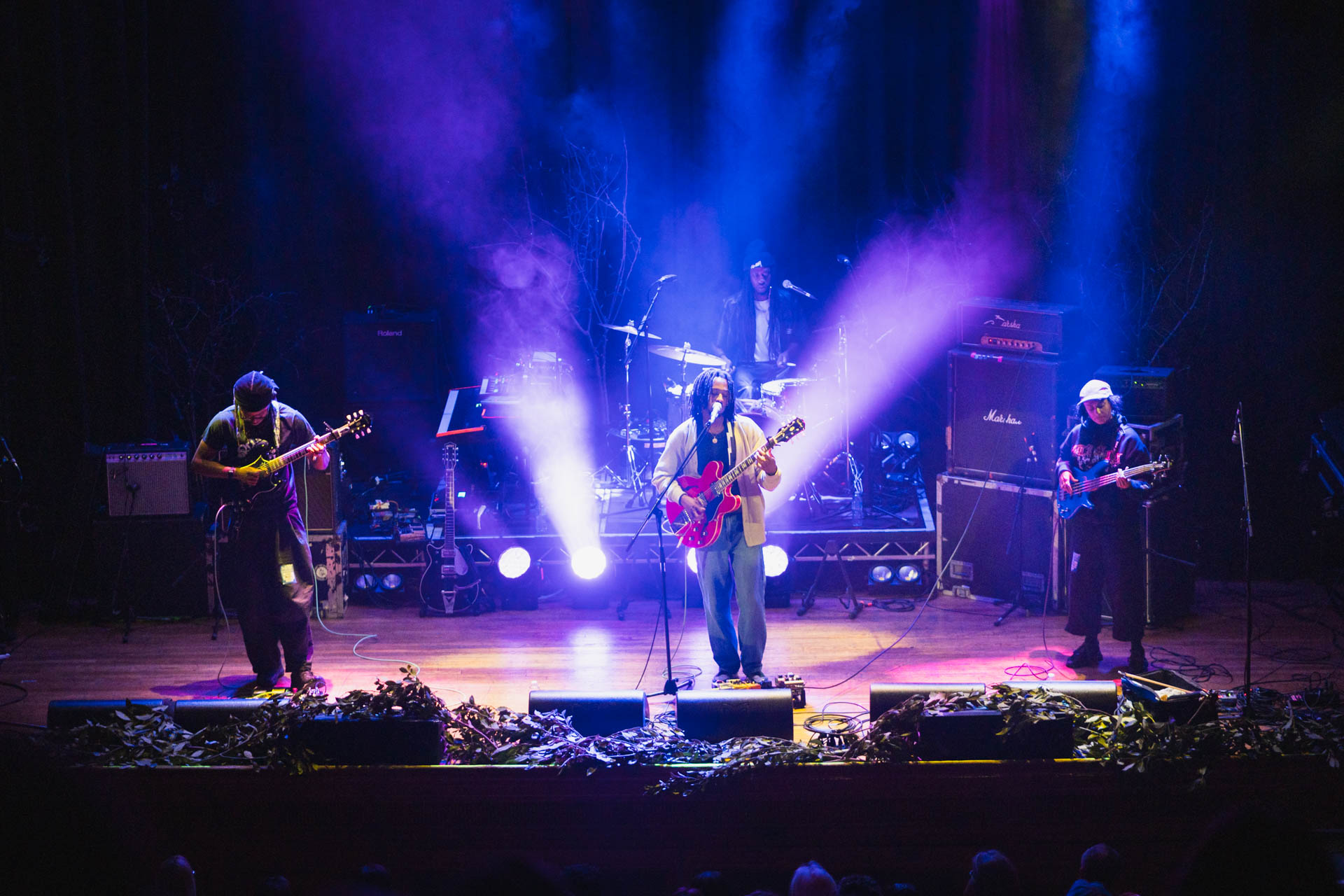
- Whitelands at Islington Assembly Hall in April 2025

Background information
- Origin: London, England
- Genres: Shoegaze, dream pop, alternative rock
- Years active: 2016–2026
- Label: Sonic Cathedral
- Past members: Etienne Quartey-Papafio; Michael Adelaja; Vanessa Govinden; Jagun Meseorisa

Whitelands was a shoegaze band from London, England. Originally formed as a solo recording project by Etienne Quartey-Papafio, the current lineup is also made up of Michael Adelaja, Vanessa Govinden, and Jagun Meseorisa. The band was signed to the record label Sonic Cathedral before they announced their disbanding on April 28 2026.

== History ==
Formed in 2017 originally as a solo recording project by Etienne Quartey-Papafio (vocals and guitar), it is now a full band completed by Michael Adelaja (guitar), Vanessa Govinden (bass), and Jagun Meseorisa (drums).

Their first full band live performance was at First Timers 2017, at DIY Space for London.

Their first full-length album Night-Bound Eyes Are Blind to the Day was released on Sonic Cathedral in February 2024. In June 2024, NME called it one of the best debut albums of the year so far. In November 2024, Rough Trade listed the album as number 64 on their top 100 albums of 2024.

On 18 June 2025, the band released the single "Heat of the Summer". On 30 September, the band released a further single titled "Glance" and announced that their next album Sunlight Echoes would be released on 30 January 2026. A music video was made for the song featuring David Jonsson and Honor Swinton Byrne. On 20 November, they released a third single from the album, "Songbird (Forever)", also accompanied by a music video. On April 28 2026 the band announced their disbanding.

== Discography ==
- Old News (2018), self-released
- Whitelands (2018), self-released digitally and on cassette on For the Sake of Tapes
- compilation (2019), Hidden Bay Records
- Night-Bound Eyes Are Blind to the Day (2024), Sonic Cathedral
- Sunlight Echoes (2026), Sonic Cathedral
