= Catch the Breeze =

Compilation album by Slowdive
- Released: 15 November 2004
- Recorded: 1990–1995
- Genre: Dream pop; shoegaze
- Label: Sanctuary Midline
- Producer: Chris Hufford, Martin Nichols

Slowdive chronology
Pygmalion (1995)	Catch the Breeze (2004)	Slowdive (2017)

Professional ratings
Review scores
Source	Rating
AllMusic	3.5/5 stars
Pitchfork	9.5/10

Catch the Breeze is a two-disc collection of songs by English shoegaze band Slowdive. It was released in November 2004 on Sanctuary Midline with sleeve notes by Paul Lester.

== Track listing ==
Disc 1:

1. "Slowdive" – 5:15
2. "Avalyn I" – 4:51
3. "Morningrise" – 4:19
4. "Catch the Breeze" – 4:17
5. "Golden Hair" – 4:02
6. "Shine" – 5:20
7. "Albatross" – 5:14
8. "Golden Hair" (Live BBC Peel Session) – 3:41
9. "Spanish Air" – 5:58
10. "So Tired" – 4:03
11. "Alison" – 3:48
12. "Country Rain" – 3:33
13. "Machine Gun" – 4:21
14. "When the Sun Hits" – 4:45

Disc 2:

1. "40 Days" – 3:15
2. "Souvlaki Space Station" – 5:58
3. "Dagger" – 3:30
4. "Here She Comes" – 2:16
5. "Melon Yellow" – 3:51
6. "Sing" – 4:49
7. "Blue Skied an' Clear" – 6:52
8. "Crazy for You" – 5:59
9. "J's Heaven" – 6:46
10. "Visions of LA" – 1:45
11. "Rutti" – 10:03
