= Keep Music Miserable =

Studio album by Lowgold
- Released: 10 October 2005
- Recorded: Jacobs Studios, Surrey, England; Gravity Shack, London, England; Mandible Studio, Portland, Oregon, USA
- Genre: Rock
- Label: Dedted Records
- Producer: Tony Lash, Lowgold, Pat Collier

Lowgold chronology
Welcome To Winners (2003)	Keep Music Miserable (2005)	Promise Lands (2008)

Keep Music Miserable is a double album by the English band Lowgold of B-sides, live and unreleased tracks, released in 2005 on the band's own record label Dedted Records. No singles were taken from the album.

== Track listing ==
All songs written by Darren Lee Ford.

=== CD1 ===
1. "Every Train"
2. "Please Be Good To Me"
3. "Make Over, Make Up"
4. "End Of The Hammer"
5. "Time Reclaims All Frontiers"
6. "Flavour"
7. "Burn A Hole"
8. "The Feelings (Extended Studio Mix)"
9. "Eddie Lejeune"
10. "If People Were Vinyl (Feat. Tux)"
11. "Beauty Dies Young (Graham Coxon Mix)"
12. "See How The World’s Moved On"
13. "Miles Is My Favourite"

=== CD2 ===
1. "I’d Rather Fuck Up Than Miss Out"
2. "Remission Time"
3. "Can’t Say No"
4. "Whatever You Think You’re Wrong"
5. "The Third One"
6. "Coming On Strong"
7. "Silver Ocean"
8. "B Land"
9. "Atlantic Pacific"
10. "God Willing"
11. "Do Not Deny Your Own Happiness"
12. "Beauty Dies Young (Live)"
13. "Never Alone (Live)"
14. "Absolute Exocet"
15. "Hip Hop Cooperative"
16. "Jacob’s Ping Pong"

== Personnel ==
- Tony Lash – producer, drums
- Darren Ford – guitar, vocals, drums
- Dan Symons – guitar
- Miles Willey – bass guitar
- Simon Scott – drums, backing vocals
