= Christian Savill =

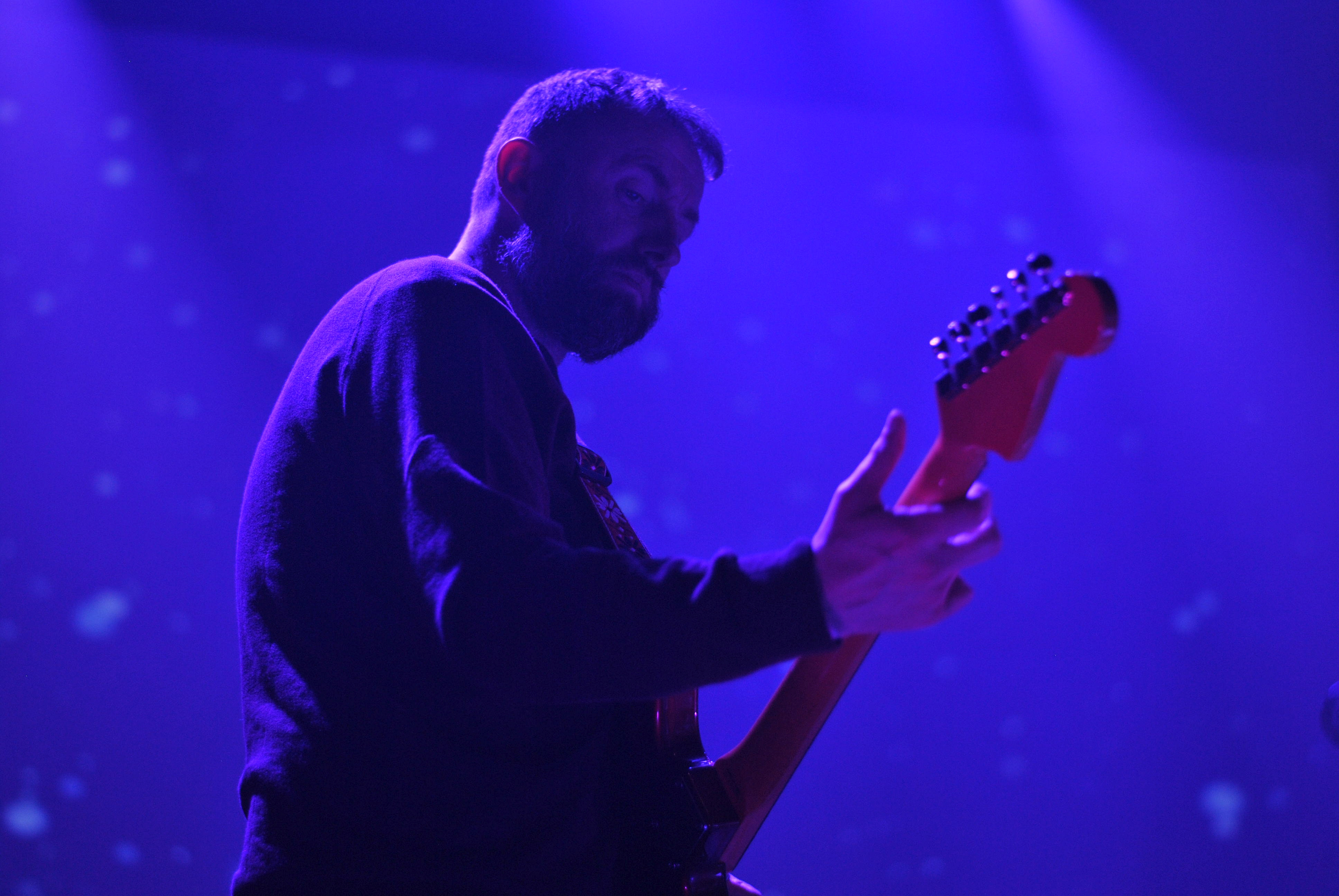
- Savill performing with Slowdive, 2017

Background information
- Birth name: Christian Savill
- Born: 6 December 1970 (age 54); Bury, England
- Genres: Indie pop; dream pop; experimental rock; shoegaze
- Occupation: Guitarist
- Instrument: Guitar
- Years active: 1989–present
- Labels: Creation Records; Graveface Records; Clairecords; Alison Records
- Member of: Slowdive, Monster Movie

Christian Savill (born 6 December 1970) is an English musician best known as the guitarist of the English rock band Slowdive.

== Early life ==
Born in Bury, Lancashire, Savill did not grow up in a musical family, but influenced by The Smiths (and specifically by Johnny Marr) decided to play guitar when he was around fourteen years old. To encourage his decision, his father bought him an electric guitar and it was at this point his family figured out he was left-handed.

Savill also stated that other guitarists influenced him: "Marr made me want to play the guitar, but also quickly made me want to quit because I realised quickly that I was never gonna be as good. William Reid then made me realise I didn't need to be technically amazing. Just so powerful, simple and totally brilliant. Their bass player only had two strings on his bass and I loved that. Then Kevin Shields with the weird tunings and out of this world sounds. Robin Guthrie was also a big influence".

== Career ==
Savill formed alternative band The Geeks with his friend Sean Hewson in 1989. This band became Eternal and the line-up consisted of Stuart Wilkinson (bass guitar) and Michael Warner (drums) and Christian Savill (voice/guitar). Sean Hewson played with them occasionally. Eternal released a single 7″, entitled "Breathe" on the indie label Sarah Records.

Shortly afterwards, he joined Slowdive after replying to an ad where they were looking for a female guitarist. "I will wear a dress if it's necessary", he told them. With him on board, the band released Just for a Day and the critically acclaimed album Souvlaki.

By the time Slowdive released their third album, Pygmalion, (1995) things in the band were tense and Savill's input was minimum. As they were not getting any money either, he and bassist Nick Chaplin left the band to find a job.

In September 2000 he relocated to London. Prior to that he spent a few years working in a software company and also running a Finnish football website. He and Sean Hewson had been doing music on and off during this time, but nothing really serious until December 1999 when they decided to actually make a record. Originally they wanted to call their band B-Movie, but after finding that to be the name of a pre-Soft Cell band they settled on their second choice, which was Monster Movie, inspired by Can's album of the same name. The band released their first, eponymous EP in 2001 through Clairecords and their first album titled Last Night Something Happened in 2002 through Clairecords in the US and Alison Records in Europe to very good reviews.

In 2020, Savill formed a new band, Beachy Head, with Ryan Graveface (Dreamend, The Casket Girls), Steve Clarke (The Soft Cavalry), Matt Duckworth (The Flaming Lips) and Slowdive bandmate Rachel Goswell. Beachy Head's eponymous debut album was released April 30, 2021, on Graveface Records.

== Discography ==
Slowdive

- Just for a Day (1991)
- Souvlaki (1993)
- Pygmalion (1995)
- Slowdive (2017)
- Everything Is Alive (2023)

Monster Movie

- Last Night Something Happened (2002, Clairecords)
- To the Moon (2003, Clairecords)
- Transistor (Mini-Album) (2004, Graveface Records)
- All Lost (2006, Graveface Records/ArtOfFact Records)
- Everyone Is a Ghost (2010, Graveface Records)
- Keep the Voices Distant (2017, Graveface Records)

Beachy Head

- Beachy Head (2021, Graveface Records)
