= Monster Movie (band) =

- Origin: Asheville, North Carolina and London, England
- Genres: Dream pop, alternative rock, electronica, indie rock
- Years active: 1989–present
- Labels: Clairecords, Alison Records, Graveface

Monster Movie is a British dream pop band originally formed by Christian Savill and Sean Hewson in 1989.

The band reformed in 1999, with Rachel Goldstar. In 2009, Ryan Graveface and Sophie Pittaway made recording contributions. In 2011, seeking to do more live performances, Gregg Cox and Sam Williams joined on bass and drums, respectively.

Savill previously played as guitarist in shoegaze band Slowdive, until he left shortly before they changed musical direction and became Mojave 3. Both Savill and Hewson had played together in the pre-Slowdive band Eternal. They released one single on Sarah Records in 1990.

In September 2009, Monster Movie announced the completion of their album Everyone Is A Ghost. The album was released by Graveface Records in March 2010. Along with occasional radio airplay on Seattle's KEXP, DJ John Richards described their debut album as "very beautiful, jangly atmospheric pop featuring smoothly strummed guitar."

== Notable performance ==
- 1990: Cartoon's in Reading, England (with Eternal and Slowdive)

== Discography ==
=== Albums ===
- Last Night Something Happened (2002, Clairecords)
- To the Moon (2003, Clairecords)
- Transistor (Mini-Album) (2004, Graveface Records)
- All Lost (2006, Graveface Records/ArtOfFact Records)
- Everyone Is a Ghost (2010, Graveface Records)
- Keep the Voices Distant (2017, Graveface Records)

=== EPs ===
- Monster Movie EP (2001, Clairecords)
- Preface EP (2002, Graveface Records) split with Dreamend
- Whirr / Monster Movie EP (2012, Graveface Records) split with Whirr
