= All Lost =

Studio album by Monster Movie
- Released: 16 May 2006
- Label: ArtOfFact

Monster Movie chronology
Transistor (2004)	All Lost (2006)	Everyone Is a Ghost (2010)

Professional ratings
Review scores
Source	Rating
Stylus Magazine	C
Tiny Mix Tapes	3.5/5 stars

All Lost is a studio album by English dreampop band Monster Movie. It was released by Artoffact Records on 16 May 2006.

Monster Movie relies not only on guitar; electronic instruments are heavily present on most tracks.

== Critical reception ==
AllMusic wrote that Monster Movie "combine their early 1990s shoegazer roots with a classic mid-'60s pop sensibility to produce a richly imagined set."

== Track listing ==
1. Behm (2:20)
2. Vanishing Act (4:08)
3. The Stars That Surround You (4:40)
4. Return To Yesterday (4:57)
5. Hope I Find The Moon (2:24)
6. Driving Through The Red Lights (3:06)
7. The Impossible (5:35)
8. 3# (5:10)
9. No One Can Know (4:15)
10. Run To The Heart Of The Sunrise (3:37)
11. Vertical Planes (3:11)
12. Falling Into The Sun (7:14)
