= Sad Day for Puppets =

Swedish rock band

Sad Day For Puppets
- Origin: Blackeberg, Stockholm, Sweden
- Genres: Shoegaze
- Years active: 2006–present
- Labels: HaHa Fonogram; Sonic Cathedral; Fastcut Records
- Members: Anna Eklund; Martin Kallholm; Marcus Sandgren; Micael Back; Alex Svenson-Metés
- Website: www.saddayforpuppets.com

Sad Day for Puppets are a Swedish rock band, who formed in 2006 in the Stockholm satellite town of Blackeberg.

== History ==
The group formed in Blackeberg in late 2006, eventually releasing their debut EP Just Like a Ghost in the spring of 2008. The EP and the band's live performances attracted positive reviews from the local indie music scene, and the group signed recording contracts with labels in both Sweden and Japan. The band promoted the EP by appearing as the opening act during a tour with Television Personalities; later that year, they embarked on their own headlining shows in the United Kingdom, Spain and Germany.

Their debut album Unknown Colors was released in 2008, with interest in the band increasing steadily outside of Sweden; the album was promoted with performances at several UK music festivals, including Volume Festival and Truck Festival. Lead single "Marble Gods" was featured on Rough Trade's sampler album Indiepop 09. The band toured widely throughout Europe and Japan in support of the record, opening for bands such as Editors, MGMT, A Place to Bury Strangers, Mystery Jets and The Raveonettes.

Their second album, Pale Silver & Shiny Gold, was released in September 2010. The band is signed to the small Swedish label HaHa FONOGRAM and have released records in Japan, the US and Europe. In the UK and Ireland the band has released two albums to date and a handful of 7” singles on the London-based label Sonic Cathedral Recordings. The band toured Japan in November 2011. In April 2013, Japanese label Fastcut Records released Come Closer, the band's third full-length album. It was recorded in Stockholm in 2012 and released in Europe in August 2013.

== Musical style and influences ==
The band's compositions have been noted by journalists to be heavily influenced by dream pop, a musical genre which typically emphasises softer melodies and arrangements. However, the production on their albums features an excessive use of noise, indicative of the production of early 1990s shoegazing records. Their work has been compared to the likes of The Jesus and Mary Chain, Dinosaur Jr., Lush, Luna and Mazzy Star.

== Band members ==
- Anna Eklund – lead vocals
- Marcus Sandgren – lead guitar
- Martin Kallholm – rhythm guitar
- Alex Svenson-Metés – bass
- Micael Back – drums

== Discography ==
Studio albums

- 2008: Unknown Colors (CD)
- 2010: Pale Silver & Shiny Gold (CD/LP)
- 2013: Come Closer (CD) Japan

EPs and 7" singles

- 2008: Just Like a Ghost EP (EP) Japan
- 2008: Hush (7") Japan
- 2009: Marble Gods/Big Waves (7") UK
- 2009: When You Tell Me That You Love Me/Withering Petals and Dust (7") UK
- 2010: Again (7") US
- 2011: Shift Another Color (EP) Japan
