= Outside Your Room EP =

EP by Slowdive
- Released: 17 May 1993
- Recorded: Protocol Studios, London; Courtyard Studios, Abingdon, Oxfordshire, UK
- Genre: Dream pop; shoegaze
- Label: Creation Records
- Producer: Slowdive

Slowdive chronology
Blue Day (1992)	Outside Your Room EP (1993)	Souvlaki (1993)

Professional ratings
Review scores
Source	Rating
AllMusic	3.5/5 stars

The Outside Your Room EP is the fourth EP by English shoegaze band Slowdive. Its title is taken from the lyrics of the song "Alison", which was also on their album Souvlaki. It reached No. 69 in the UK Singles Chart.

== Track listing ==
1. "Alison" (Neil Halstead) – (3:51)
2. "So Tired" (Neil Halstead) – (4:04)
3. "Souvlaki Space Station" (Slowdive) – (5:59)
4. "Moussaka Chaos" (Slowdive) – (6:24)
