= Just for a Day =

Studio album by Slowdive
- Released: 2 September 1991
- Studio: Courtyard (Abingdon)
- Genres: Shoegaze; dream pop
- Length: 43:07
- Label: Creation
- Producers: Neil Halstead; Chris Hufford

Slowdive chronology
Holding Our Breath (1991)	Just for a Day (1991)	Blue Day (1992)

Singles from Just for a Day
- 1. "Catch the Breeze" Released: 3 June 1991

Just for a Day is the debut studio album by English rock band Slowdive, released on 2 September 1991 by Creation Records.

== Style ==
Music critic Jim DeRogatis called the album's style “one of the lushest and most layered sounds of the shoegazer movement.”

== Recording ==
Just for a Day was recorded at Courtyard Studios, formerly known as Georgetown Studios, in Abingdon in the Thames Valley.

== Release ==
Just for a Day was released on 2 September 1991 by Creation Records. It peaked at number 32 on the UK Albums Chart. Prior to the album's release, the EP Holding Our Breath, which featured the Just for a Day song "Catch the Breeze" as its lead track, was issued on CD and 12" vinyl on 3 June 1991, along with its 7" vinyl equivalent, the "Catch the Breeze" single. In the United States, Just for a Day was released by SBK Records in 1992.

On 14 November 2005, a remastered edition of Just for a Day was issued by the Sanctuary Records subsidiary label Castle Music, supplemented by an extra disc containing tracks from the band's first three EPs: Slowdive, Morningrise and Holding Our Breath. Another remastered edition featuring the same bonus material was released by Cherry Red Records on 16 August 2010.

== Critical reception ==
Professional ratings
Review scores
Source	Rating
AllMusic	3.5/5 stars
Chicago Tribune	2.5/4 stars
Entertainment Weekly	B
NME	8/10
Pitchfork	7.0/10
Q	3/5 stars
Record Collector	4/5 stars
Rolling Stone	2/5 stars
Select	3/5
Stylus Magazine	A−

The initial reception to Just for a Day from the British music press was lukewarm, in contrast to the enthusiasm with which Slowdive's earlier releases had been met. Jon Ridge, reviewing Just for a Day for Lime Lizard magazine, thought that the album was premature, describing it as "more a continuation, or aqueous celebration rather, than an advancement" compared to the band's "rather spiffing" previous EPs. Dan Maier of Select found Slowdive "too direct" in their musical approach, writing that they "just sing slowly, play fuzzy, and end up sounding like the Cocteau Twins with ballast." Melody Maker was especially disparaging, with critic Paul Lester panning Just for a Day as a "major fucking letdown". Conversely, Simon Williams of NME championed the record, calling it "frequently exceptional" and "a fine, fragrant affair".

In a retrospective essay, Trouser Press deemed the material on Just for a Day inconsistent, but concluded that "the songs that are solid are breathtaking, and those that aren't are at least hypnotic and slowly sensuous." Reappraising the album in 2005 for Pitchfork, Nitsuh Abebe said that "if anything in Slowdive's catalogue will seem dated, it's the overgroomed production on these songs", while nonetheless noting a "terrifically oceanic" quality to Just for a Day as a whole. In his review of the record for AllMusic, Abebe cited the songs "Celia's Dream" and "Erik's Song" in particular as being indicative of what he believed was the more fully realized sound of Slowdive's next album, Souvlaki (1993).

Critic Ned Raggett ranked Just for a Day at number 17 on his decade-end list of the best albums of the 1990s for Freaky Trigger. In 2016, Pitchfork listed it as the seventh best shoegaze album of all time.

== Track listing ==
All tracks are written by Neil Halstead, except where noted.

No.	Title	Length
1.	"Spanish Air"	6:00
2.	"Celia's Dream"	4:06
3.	"Catch the Breeze"	4:16
4.	"Ballad of Sister Sue"	4:31
5.	"Erik's Song" (Instrumental)	4:24
6.	"Waves"	5:50
7.	"Brighter"	3:47
8.	"The Sadman"	4:43
9.	"Primal"	5:30
Total length:		43:07

2005 reissue bonus disc
No.	Title	Writer(s)	Appeared on	Length
1.	"Slowdive"		Slowdive	5:13
2.	"Avalyn I"		Slowdive	4:50
3.	"Avalyn II"		Slowdive	8:08
4.	"Morningrise"		Morningrise	4:18
5.	"She Calls"		Morningrise	5:35
6.	"Losing Today"	Halstead; Nick Chaplin; Rachel Goswell	Morningrise	4:59
7.	"Golden Hair"	Syd Barrett; James Joyce	Holding Our Breath	4:02
8.	"Shine"	Halstead; Chaplin; Goswell; Christian Savill	Holding Our Breath	5:21
9.	"Albatross"		Holding Our Breath	5:15
10.	"Catch the Breeze" (Peel session, 21/4/91)			4:07
11.	"Shine" (Peel session, 21/4/91)	Halstead; Chaplin; Goswell; Savill		5:17
12.	"Golden Hair" (Peel session, 21/4/91)	Barrett; Joyce		3:45
Total length:				60:50

== Personnel ==
Credits are adapted from the album's liner notes.

Slowdive

- Rachel Goswell – vocals, guitar
- Neil Halstead – vocals, guitar
- Christian Savill – guitar
- Nick Chaplin – bass guitar
- Simon Scott – drums

Production

- Neil Halstead – production
- Chris Hufford – production, engineering
- Slowdive – mixing

Design

- Califram – photography

== Charts ==
Chart (1991)	Peak position
UK Albums (Official Charts)	32
UK Independent Albums (OCC)	1
