= Promise Lands =

Studio album by Lowgold
- Released: 31 March 2008
- Recorded: The Dairy, Brixton, London, England; Home Studio, England
- Genre: Rock
- Label: Goldhawk Recordings/ Cooking Vinyl
- Producer: Darren Ford, Dan Roe

Lowgold chronology
Keep Music Miserable (2005)	Promise Lands (2008)

Professional ratings
Review scores
Source	Rating
musicOMH	4/5 stars
Soundmag.de	4/5 stars

Promise Lands is the fourth album by English band Lowgold, released in 2008 on Goldhawk Recordings.

The album was recorded at The Dairy, Brixton, London and at Darren Ford's home studio, co-produced by Ford and Dan Roe and mixed by Gareth Parton who has previously worked with The Go! Team. Burning Embers was released as a digital single.

== Track listing ==
All songs written by Darren Lee Ford except "Farmer's Tale" by Dan Symons.

1. "Clear"
2. "Burning Embers"
3. "Just Like Skin"
4. "Don't Let Love In"
5. "Flame"
6. "When The Song Is Over"
7. "Dead Sea"
8. "Nothing Stays The Same"
9. "Farmer's Tale"
10. "Hope And Reason"
11. "Silk And Steel"
12. "Climb The Sea"
13. "Feathered Word"

(11–13 iTunes only bonus tracks)

== UK singles ==
1. "Burning Embers" (2008)

== Personnel ==
- Darren Ford – guitar, drums, vocals
- Dan Symons – guitar
- Miles Willey – bass guitar
