= Just Backward of Square =

Studio album by Lowgold
- Released: 12 February 2001
- Recorded: Chipping Norton Recording Studios, Oxfordshire, England; Jacobs Studios, Surrey, England
- Genre: Rock
- Label: Nude Records
- Producer: Tony Lash; Dave Eringa (Counterfeit & additional on Mercury)

Lowgold chronology
Just Backward of Square (2001)	Welcome To Winners (2003)

Professional ratings
Review scores
Source	Rating
Daily Express	5/5 stars

Just Backward of Square is the debut album by English band Lowgold, released in 2001.

The album was produced by former Elliott Smith associate Tony Lash, mixed by Dave Eringa and reached 33 in the UK Albums Chart. The band's debut release "The 108 EP" was lifted from the album, as well as four singles, including a re-recording of "Beauty Dies Young".

== Track listing ==
All songs written by Darren Lee Ford except Golden Ratio by Miles Willey.

1. "Golden Ratio"
2. "Beauty Dies Young"
3. "Mercury"
4. "Out of Reach"
5. "Back Here Again"
6. "Counterfeit"
7. "Never Alone"
8. "In Amber"
9. "Open the Airwaves"
10. "Less I Offer"
11. "Into the Void"

== UK singles ==
1. "The 108 E.P" (24 July 2000)
2. "Beauty Dies Young" (18 September 2000) – UK #67
3. "Mercury" (29 January 2001) – UK #48
4. "Counterfeit" (30 April 2001) – UK #52
5. "Beauty Dies Young" (Re-Recording) (27 August 2001) – UK #40

== Personnel ==
- Tony Lash – producer, drums
- Darren Ford – guitar, vocals, drums
- Dan Symons – guitar
- Miles Willey – bass guitar
- Simon Scott – drums on Counterfeit
