= Everything Is Alive (album) =

Studio album by Slowdive
- Released: 1 September 2023
- Genre: Shoegaze
- Length: 41:37
- Label: Dead Oceans
- Producer: Neil Halstead

Slowdive chronology
Slowdive (2017)	Everything Is Alive (2023)

Singles from Everything Is Alive
- 1. "Kisses" Released: 20 June 2023; 2. "Skin in the Game" Released: 18 July 2023; 3. "The Slab" Released: 9 August 2023; 4. "Alife" Released: 30 August 2023

Everything Is Alive is the fifth studio album by English rock band Slowdive, released on 1 September 2023 through Dead Oceans. It is their first album in six years and their second since reforming, following their self-titled album released in 2017.

The album received critical acclaim and was commercially successful throughout Europe, reaching the top ten in Belgium, Germany, the Netherlands, New Zealand and the United Kingdom.

== Background ==
Slowdive entered the studio in September 2020 to begin recording their fifth album. The band originally booked studio sessions for April 2020 that were cancelled as a result of the COVID-19 pandemic. During the pandemic, the band suffered the loss of Rachel Goswell's mother and Simon Scott's father. Neil Halstead, who wrote all of the album's songs, said that the music was more of an "escape" from the darkness that the band's members were going through. Goswell struggled with alcoholism in the wake of her grief before entering sobriety. "I thought it was going to be quite a dark record but once we got together as a band, I think some of that darkness lifted and some of the tunes became a bit lighter," Halstead said.

The album arose from material that Halstead wrote with modular synthesizers in 2019 for a planned electronic solo record. He was unsure of the song "Kisses", which was ultimately released as the album's lead single, as it felt "too pop" for him. The instrumental "Prayer Remembered" originated from an arpeggiated synth line before Scott filtered guitar leads through a Max patch system. Halstead flew out to Los Angeles to mix the album with producer Shawn Everett, which resulted in the drums becoming "dirtier sounding".

== Critical reception ==
Professional ratings
Aggregate scores
Source	Rating
AnyDecentMusic?	7.9/10
Metacritic	82/100
Review scores
Source	Rating
AllMusic	4/5 stars
Clash	8/10
DIY	4/5 stars
The Guardian	4/5 stars
Louder Than War	5/5
Mojo	3/5 stars
Pitchfork	7.7/10
The Skinny	4/5 stars
Slant Magazine	4/5 stars
Uncut	9/10

Everything Is Alive received a score of 82 out of 100 on review aggregator Metacritic based on 20 critics' reviews, indicating "universal acclaim". Editors of AnyDecentMusic? gave it a score of 7.9 out of 10 based on 20 reviews. Uncut called it "the Slowdive you've been waiting for", while Mojo described it as "evocative rather than vivid in a way that evokes Faith-era Cure's greyscale atmosphere", calling it "the sound of Slowdive still holding their impressive earthly form". The Skinny's Lewis Wade summarised Everything Is Alive as "another Slowdive release that does little to alter their position as stalwarts of the nebulous shoegaze scene. Emotional textures are evoked through gauzy vocals and guitar reverb, with just a few tweaks to the formula here and there".

Irina Shtreis of The Quietus wrote that it "appears to be more immediate and transparent than its predecessor" and "while at first listen Everything Is Alive might seem plain and minimalist, its flavours can be savoured for a long time". Dana Poland of Slant Magazine opined that while it "may not boast the lo-fi grit of Slowdive's earlier work", nevertheless "the band's skill for scrupulous melodies is undiminished here. The album evolves Slowdive's well-established sound with more electronic textures, creating a conceptual sonic landscape that buzzes with life".

Dave Simpson of The Guardian gave a favourable review of the album, comparing some songs on the album to early New Order and commenting that "the band deserve much credit for sticking to their guns and proving a lot of people wrong". David Murphy of MusicOMH described it as a "joyful listen", writing that it "tak[es] the cloud tunnel bliss of the best shoegaze and add[s] some pure pop pleasure". Clash's Robin Murray found Everything Is Alive to be "at times experimental, it forever returns to their core values, with this tension supplying some of the album's finest moments", concluding that it is "enchanting and illuminating, [and] proves that Slowdive's pulse is still beating strong".

Joe Goggins of DIY stated that "listening to Everything Is Alive, you get the sense that the veteran shoegazers couldn't rush something if they'd tried" as it "very much gives off the sense that the slower gestations lead to the richest rewards". Reviewing the album for Spin, Jonathan Cohen commented that the album's "maturity and depth of feeling transcends genre and style—something that's sadly rare from guitar-based rock'n'roll at this late date". Wayne Carey of Louder Than War called it "easily the best album of their career" as it is "heavy with experience, but each note is poised, wise, and necessarily pitched to hope".

Tim Sendra of AllMusic characterised Everything Is Alive as "equally experimental and accessible, brimming over with aquatic atmosphere and pointed emotional feeling, and full of familiar joys and new surprises", calling it "the work of a group who are done reforming and have set their sights on brilliant evolution instead". John Garratt of PopMatters opined that "from the haunted guitars to the impressionist vocals, from the most spell-binding drones to the brisk tempos, this is a Slowdive album through and through". Pitchfork's Jayson Greene felt the "music is wispier, more skeletal, attuned to and aware of fading glories" as "the length feels purposeful and personal, like these songs are sketches from a journal Halstead and Goswell left open" and "the love songs feel lonelier, the landscape more unforgiving".

The Guardian ranked it the 45th best album of 2023.

== Track listing ==
All tracks are written by Neil Halstead.

Everything Is Alive track listing
No.	Title	Length
1.	"Shanty"	5:47
2.	"Prayer Remembered"	4:46
3.	"Alife"	4:33
4.	"Andalucia Plays"	6:41
5.	"Kisses"	3:57
6.	"Skin in the Game"	3:52
7.	"Chained to a Cloud"	6:51
8.	"The Slab"	5:10
Total length:		41:37

== Personnel ==
Slowdive

- Nick Chaplin – bass
- Rachel Goswell – vocals
- Neil Halstead – vocals, guitar, keyboards, production, Pro Tools (all tracks); mixing (tracks 1, 7)
- Christian Savill – guitar
- Simon Scott – drums, electronics

Technical

- Heba Kadry – mastering
- Shawn Everett – mixing (2–6, 8)
- Ian Davenport – engineering
- Pieter Rietkerk – engineering

== Charts ==
Chart performance for Everything Is Alive
Chart (2023)	Peak position
Australian Albums (ARIA)	21
Belgian Albums (Ultratop Flanders)	9
Belgian Albums (Ultratop Wallonia)	24
Danish Albums (Hitlisten)	30
Dutch Albums (Album Top 100)	4
French Albums (SNEP)	54
German Albums (Offizielle Top 100)	7
Irish Albums (IRMA)	54
Japanese Hot Albums (Billboard Japan)	96
New Zealand Albums (RMNZ)	10
Portuguese Albums (AFP)	15
Scottish Albums (OCC)	5
Spanish Albums (PROMUSICAE)	30
Spanish Albums (PROMUSICAE)	47
Swiss Albums (Schweizer Hitparade)	17
UK Albums (OCC)	6
UK Independent Albums (OCC)	1
US Billboard 200	63
US Independent Albums (Billboard)	11
US Top Alternative Albums (Billboard)	7
US Top Rock Albums (Billboard)	12
