= Slowdive (EP) =

EP by Slowdive
- Released: 5 November 1990
- Recorded: The White House Studio
- Genre: Shoegazing; dream pop
- Length: 18:19
- Label: Creation
- Producer: Martin Nichols

Slowdive chronology
Slowdive (1990)	Morningrise (1991)

Slowdive is the debut EP by the English rock band Slowdive. It was released in 1990 by record label Creation.

== Reception ==
Professional ratings
Review scores
Source	Rating
AllMusic	3.5/5 stars

According to The Rough Guide to Rock, Slowdive was released "to rapturous applause from the press". Steve Lamacq of NME said the title track was "an atmospheric wash of watercolour guitars mixed in with some plaintive, impressionable vocals. Not quite as punishing as their demo, but it has a certain positively fresh-faced Bloody Valentine quality to it that swells with continued listening."

In his retrospective review, Andy Kellman of AllMusic wrote "Slowdive's first release is their weakest effort, but it's still a good cluster of somnambulist soundscapes and inert sonic haze. They were definitely falling toward a mood-over-song structure at this point."

== Track listing ==
All tracks are written by Neil Halstead.

No.	Title	Length
1.	"Slowdive"	5:16
2.	"Avalyn I"	4:55
3.	"Avalyn II"	8:08
