= Pop Ambient 2014 =

Compilation album by Various
- Released: February 4, 2014
- Genre: Ambient
- Length: 53:33
- Label: Kompakt

Various chronology
Pop Ambient 2013 (2013)	Pop Ambient 2014 (2014)	Pop Ambient 2015 (2014)

Professional ratings
Aggregate scores
Source	Rating
Metacritic	74/100
Review scores
Source	Rating
AllMusic	3/5 stars

Pop Ambient 2014 is a compilation album of ambient music. It was released in February 2014 under Kompakt Records, the 14th in their Pop Ambient series.

== Track list ==
No.	Title	Artist	Length
1.	"Sicht"	Ulf Lohmann	5:01
2.	"Treatment"	Thomas Fehlmann	6:32
3.	"Patience"	Mikkel Metal	7:02
4.	"The Philosophers Trap"	Marsen Jules	6:37
5.	"Moorpark"	Cologne Tape	2:35
6.	"Für Betty"	Simon Scott	5:45
7.	"Aquamarine" (Triola Mix)	The Bionaut	4:24
8.	"Rückverzauberung 8"	Wolfgang Voigt	7:02
9.	"Cupid's Head" (Gas Ambient Mix)	The Field	7:36
10.	"PCC"	Ulf Lohmann	4:59
