= Pygmalion (album) =

Studio album by Slowdive
- Released: 6 February 1995
- Studio: Courtyard (Sutton Courtenay)
- Genres: Ambient pop; post-rock; psychedelia; electronica
- Length: 48:11
- Label: Creation
- Producers: Chris Hufford; Slowdive

Slowdive chronology
5 (1993)	Pygmalion (1995)	Catch the Breeze (2004)

Pygmalion is the third studio album by English rock band Slowdive, released on 6 February 1995 by Creation Records. It was the group's final album before their disbandment in 1995 and later reformation in 2014, and their only album with Ian McCutcheon, who had replaced Simon Scott on drums.

== Composition ==
Pygmalion is a significant departure from the shoegaze style that Slowdive had established in their previous two studio albums, Just for a Day (1991) and Souvlaki (1993). The album features a more experimental sound tilted towards ambient electronic music, with sparse, atmospheric arrangements. Pitchfork's Nitsuh Abebe described the album's songs as "ambient pop dreams" that are stylistically closer to post-rock, in the then-contemporary first wave of the genre, than the band's trademark style. Regardless, BBC Music writer Wyndham Wallace still viewed Pygmalion as a shoegaze album, although not in the conventional sense of the style, noting that at points the album forgoes conventional percussion, or percussion in general, entirely.

With the exception of the lyrics for the songs "Miranda" and "Visions of LA", which were written by Rachel Goswell, Pygmalion was composed by Neil Halstead. Several songs on the album reflect Halstead's experimentation with digital technology and techniques such as looping and reverb. This was born out of his then-increasing fascination with electronica and dance music, which he had been introduced to in 1992 by ex-Seefeel member Mark Van Hoen, who had played Aphex Twin's Selected Ambient Works 85-92 for Halstead.

== Release ==
Pygmalion was released on 6 February 1995 by Creation Records. The cover illustration for the album, designed by Steven Woodhouse, features imagery from Rainer Wehinger's graphic notation for György Ligeti's 1958 work Artikulation. Though Slowdive had begun preparing for an expected tour of the United Kingdom in support of Pygmalion, a week after the album's release Creation dropped Slowdive from its roster, and by the end of the year the band had split.

The Sanctuary Records subsidiary label Castle Music issued a remastered edition of Pygmalion in 2005. Cherry Red Records issued another remastered edition of the album on 16 August 2010, with a bonus disc consisting of demo versions of Pygmalion-era tracks.

== Critical reception and legacy ==
Professional ratings
Review scores
Source	Rating
AllMusic	4/5 stars
The Guardian	3/4 stars
Mojo	3/5 stars
NME	5/10
Pitchfork	8.7/10
Q	4/5 stars
Record Collector	5/5 stars
Select	2/5
Sputnikmusic	5/5
Uncut	8/10

Pygmalion was largely overlooked by contemporary music critics, with competing musical trends and the radically different style of the album being main factors according to journalist Kieron Tyler; with the Britpop genre at the height of its popularity, Slowdive were seen as "past-their-sell-by-date shoegazers" by a music press who were more interested in covering the Britpop scene. For instance, in Melody Maker, Jonathan Selzer dismissed Pygmalion as "an insipid attempt at prettiness". John Harris wrote in NME that the album represented a seeming act of "career suicide" by the band, for whom he composed a mock epitaph: "Slowdive ... They could have had the world, but they decided to go all skeletal and wibbly and make sneakingly fascinating records that will sell absolutely fart all." However, Q's Andrew Collins was positive and enthusiastic, saying that the album "basks splendidly in its own sod-you resonant shapelessness." Caroline Sullivan of The Guardian was intrigued by the album's sound and quipped that it "should spark many a philosophy debate—after all, if music is this minimal, can it be said to exist at all?"

In a retrospective review for Pitchfork in 2005, Nitsuh Abebe called Pygmalion "a detour of the best sort", and in a separate appraisal for AllMusic, Abebe stated that "for anyone who appreciates the indirect and intangible, it's a stylistic masterpiece." In his review for BBC Music, Wyndham Wallace wrote that Pygmalion "remains Halstead and Goswell's masterpiece", while Head Heritage writer Rust Phimister said that with the album, "Slowdive distilled the expansive aural atmospheres of Souvlaki to perfection." Trouser Press, however, found that Pygmalion "completely lacks all the tension, songwriting, sounds and power of the band's work, leaving only the spatial dimensions", deeming it "essentially a solo ambient recording" by Halstead "that should have been released under his own name".

The Pygmalion song "Blue Skied an' Clear" was featured in the 1995 film The Doom Generation; Gregg Araki, the film's director, is an avowed fan of Slowdive.

In 1999, critic Ned Raggett ranked Pygmalion at number 122 on his list of the best albums of the 1990s for Freaky Trigger. In 2016, Pitchfork listed it as the 12th best shoegaze album of all time. Pitchfork described Pygmalion as a "post-rock masterpiece" in a 2018 article that included quotes from several musicians professing appreciation for the record, including members of Low, The Twilight Sad, Deafheaven, Múm, A Place to Bury Strangers, Survive, and Girlpool.

== Track listing ==
All tracks are written by Neil Halstead; "Miranda" and "Visions of LA" co-written with Rachel Goswell.

No.	Title	Length
1.	"Rutti"	10:02
2.	"Crazy for You"	6:00
3.	"Miranda"	4:48
4.	"Trellisaze"	6:18
5.	"Cello"	1:33
6.	"J's Heaven"	6:47
7.	"Visions of LA"	1:43
8.	"Blue Skied an' Clear"	6:52
9.	"All of Us"	4:08
Total length:		48:11

2010 reissue bonus disc (Pygmalion Demos)
No.	Title	Length
1.	"Miranda (demo version)"	3:46
2.	"Watch Me"	3:45
3.	"Yesterday"	4:20
4.	"To Watch"	5:52
5.	"Option One (Instrumental #1)"	3:50
6.	"Cargo"	4:24
7.	"Sinewaves"	5:12
8.	"Ambient Guitar"	5:47
9.	"Crazy for You" (alt. version)	4:37
10.	"Krautruck"	5:05
11.	"Changes"	4:51
12.	"Red Five"	6:07
Total length:		57:36

== Personnel ==
Credits are adapted from the album's liner notes.

Slowdive

- Rachel Goswell – vocals, guitar
- Neil Halstead – vocals, guitar
- Christian Savill – guitar
- Nick Chaplin – bass guitar
- Ian McCutcheon – drums

Production

- Chris Hufford – production, engineering
- Slowdive – production, engineering

Design

- Steven Woodhouse – cover illustration

== Charts ==
Chart (1995)	Peak position
UK Albums (Official Charts)	108
UK Independent Albums (OCC)	7

Chart (2026)	Peak position
Greek Albums (IFPI)	56
