= Unknown Colors =

Studio album by Sad Day for Puppets
- Released: 28 October 2008
- Genre: Shoegazing
- Label: HaHa Fonogram
- Producer: Martin Källholm; Alex Svenson-Metés

Sad Day for Puppets chronology
Unknown Colors (2008)	Pale Silver & Shiny Gold (2010)

Unknown Colors is the debut studio album by Swedish quintet Sad Day for Puppets. It was initially released exclusively in Sweden on 28 October 2008 by independent label HaHa Fonogram, with a United Kingdom release following eight months later on 1 June 2009 via Sonic Cathedral Recordings. The UK edition contained two exclusive bonus tracks, "When You Tell Me That You Love Me" and "Saddest Cloud".

== Recording and promotion ==
The majority of songs on the record were composed within a six-month period. "Marble Gods" was released as the album's lead single, and appeared on Rough Trade's sampler album Indiepop 09. "Cherry Blossom" was also released as a single. The band promoted the album with performances at several UK music festivals, including Truck Festival.

== Critical reception ==
The record received positive review upon release. Heather Phares of AllMusic rated the album four stars out of five, praising it for revisiting the "halcyon days of the late '80s and early '90s, when indie pop crossbred with shoegaze, and groups like Lush, Bettie Serveert, and Velocity Girl mixed those dreamy sonics with immediate hooks and melodies." She summarised by saying: "Even if there aren't too many previously unknown sounds on Unknown Colors, Sad Day for Puppets know how to use them well." A writer for Sydsvenskan complimented the disparity between the influences the band used in composing the record, and said they succeeded in making a record "better than their combined influences. There's something quite majestic going on here, even if you can't put your finger on it." Likewise, Swedish magazine Muzic said: "The music and melodies are elaborate and well composed without being predictable or too easily accessible, which is an art in itself to master." NME was complimentary of Anna Eklund's vocals, saying that her "spectral diction – enshrined under glacial washes of distortion – is seductive and richly evocative." Although Joyzine was dismissive about the length of time it took the band to compose the album, and said such brevity often resulted in sub-par records, they described Unknown Colors as a major leap forward for the group.

The album also received some mixed reviews. A writer for Sonic Magazine said they enjoyed the first ten songs, but "quickly lost interest" during the album's eleventh track, when "everything begins to fall flat". Groove described the record as "nice" while indicating "Little Light" was its best song, but was unimpressed by the rest of the album.

== Track listing ==
All songs written and composed by Martin Källholm.

1. "Little Light" – 3:17
2. "Blue Skies" – 4:00
3. "Marble Gods" – 3:45
4. "Mother's Tears" – 3:06
5. "Cherry Blossom" – 3:06
6. "Lay Your Burden On Me" – 5:21
7. "When the Morning Comes" – 2:54
8. "Last Night" – 3:38
9. "Shiny Teeth and Sharpened Claws" – 3:23
10. "Romans" – 3:18
11. "All the Songs" – 4:01
12. "My Twin Star" – 4:09
13. "Withering Petals and Dust" – 3:03
14. "When You Tell Me That You Love Me" – 3:22 (UK bonus track)
15. "Saddest Cloud" – 2:06 (UK bonus track)

== Personnel ==
Credits adapted from the liner notes of Unknown Colors.

- Anna Eklund – vocals
- Marcus Sandgren – lead guitar
- Martin Källholm – songwriter, guitar, piano, producer
- Alex Svenson-Metés – bass, keyboards, background vocals, percussion, drums on "Mother's Tears", "Cherry Blossom", "Lay Your Burden On Me" and "My Twin Star", producer, recording engineer, mixing
- Micael Back – drums on "Little Light", "Marble Gods" and "Last Night"

Additional personnel:

- Patrik Andersson – pedal steel guitar on "Lay Your Burden On Me", "Last Night" and "Withering Petals and Dust"
- Annika Eklund – background vocals
- Hannes Fornander – background vocals
- Gustaf Kjellin – photography, artwork
- Henrik Lindquist – sdfp logo
- Christoffer Narin – drums on "All the Songs" and "Withering Petals and Dust"
- Karl Alfred Nilsson – drums on "Blue Skies", "Shiny Teeth and Sharpened Claws" and "Romans"
- Andreas Tilliander – mastering
