= Neil Halstead =

English musician

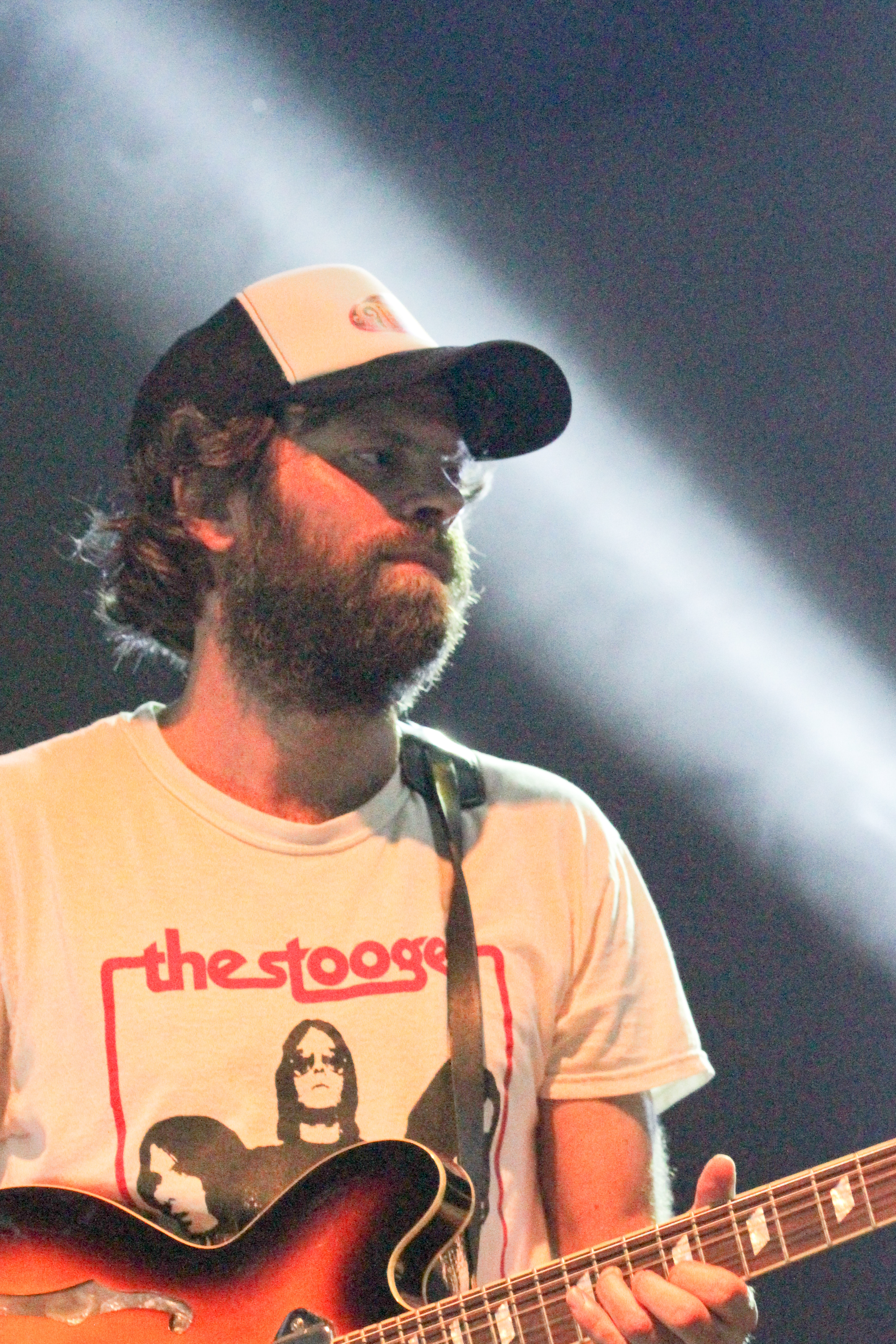
- Halstead performing in 2014

Background information
- Born: 7 October 1970 (age 56); Reading, Berkshire, England
- Genres: Alternative rock; indie rock; shoegaze; dream pop; folk
- Occupations: Musician; singer; songwriter; record producer
- Instruments: Vocals; guitar
- Member of: Slowdive
- Formerly of: Mojave 3

Neil Halstead (born 7 October 1970) is an English musician known as the singer, primary songwriter, producer and guitarist of shoegaze band Slowdive. He has been hailed by AllMusic as "one of Britain's most respected songwriters", and Time Out as "one of Britain's greatest songwriters".

== Career ==
Halstead was born in Reading, Berkshire, England. He is a singer/guitarist and served as frontman and primary songwriter for the shoegaze band Slowdive, formed in 1989 out of his first band, the Pumpkin Fairies. Slowdive released the albums Just for a Day (1991), Souvlaki (1993), Pygmalion (1995), Slowdive (2017) and Everything Is Alive (2023).

Halstead also recorded with a side project called Zurich with members of Seefeel and Knives ov Resistance; the trio's sole album was released in 2014.

Following their 1995 breakup, members of Slowdive formed Mojave 3, led by Neil Halstead. The group released a series of albums that incorporated elements of alt-country, psychedelic rock, and dream pop.

In 2006, Mojave 3 went on an indefinite hiatus, prompting Halstead to embark on an acoustic-driven solo career marked by an emphasis on British folk-inspired melody and a love of surfing. An occasional drift into more whimsical territory prompted NME to describe Halstead as "like Syd Barrett if he’d ever set foot on a surf board". Halstead's first solo album, Sleeping on Roads, was released in 2001, followed by Oh! Mighty Engine (2008), released on friend and fellow surfer Jack Johnson's Brushfire Records label. Halstead's third solo album, Palindrome Hunches, was released in 2012; it was described as "an exquisite set of dark folk music" by The Times, while God Is In The TV called it "undoubtedly one of the finest British records released this year".

Halstead formed the project Black Hearted Brother in 2013, releasing one album, Stars Are Our Home.

Slowdive, including Halstead, reformed in 2014, and released their fourth, self-titled, album in 2017.

In 2015, Halstead served as the touring guitarist for Sun Kil Moon on select European dates, including their appearance at the Primavera Sound festival.

Halstead produced Mary Lattimore's 2020 album Silver Ladders.

== Solo discography ==
=== Studio albums ===
- Sleeping on Roads (2001, 4AD)
- Oh! Mighty Engine (2008, Brushfire)
- Palindrome Hunches (2012, Brushfire)

=== Guest appearances ===
- "Has Your Mind Got Away?" – Friends and Lovers by Bernard Butler (1999, Creation Records)
- "Away" – Shelter by Alcest (2014, Prophecy Productions)
- "Lonely Heart Reverb", "Cloudy Heart" and "Lover" – Cross the Verge by Joana Serrat (2016, Loose)
