= Slowdive =

British shoegaze band

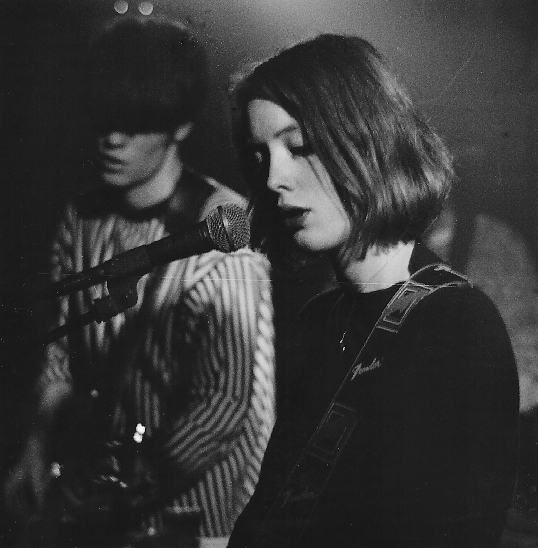
- Neil Halstead and Rachel Goswell performing with Slowdive in Leicester, England, 1992

Background information
- Origin: Reading, Berkshire, England
- Genres: Dream pop; shoegaze; ambient pop; post-rock
- Years active: 1989–1995; 2013–present
- Labels: Creation; SBK; Dead Oceans; Sonic Cathedral
- Spinoffs: Mojave 3; Monster Movie
- Spinoff of: The Pumpkin Fairies (1988–1989)
- Members: Neil Halstead; Rachel Goswell; Nick Chaplin; Christian Savill; Simon Scott
- Past members: Adrian Sell; Neil Carter; Ian McCutcheon
- Website: slowdiveofficial.com

Slowdive (stylised in lowercase) is an English rock band that formed in Reading, Berkshire, in 1989. The band consists of Neil Halstead (vocals, guitars, keyboards), Rachel Goswell (vocals, guitars, keyboards), Christian Savill (guitars), Nick Chaplin (bass guitar), and Simon Scott (drums, guitars, electronics), all of whom played on the band's early records. Halstead is the band's primary songwriter.

After releasing several EPs, the band released debut album Just for a Day (1991) and follow up Souvlaki (1993), making the band one of the leading figures of the UK shoegaze scene of the early 1990s. The group broke up soon after the release of their third studio album, Pygmalion, in 1995, having seen Scott, Savill and Chaplin depart the band prior. The remaining members continued under a more folk and country-influenced direction as Mojave 3.

Slowdive reunited in 2014 to play the Primavera Sound festival and released a self-titled studio album in 2017, their first in 22 years. The band's fifth studio album, Everything Is Alive, was released in 2023 and became Slowdive's first top ten album in any country, doing so in Belgium, Germany, the Netherlands, New Zealand and the United Kingdom.

== History ==
=== 1989–1991: Formation and early EPs ===
Slowdive were formed in Reading, England, by Neil Halstead and Rachel Goswell in October 1989. The two sang and played guitar, and had been friends since they were 6 years old. At a Sunday youth group, they began making music in an indie pop band called the Pumpkin Fairies, with bassist Mike Cottle and drummer Adrian Sell. When the Pumpkin Fairies disbanded, Slowdive formed, also including drummer Adrian Sell and Sell's friend, bassist Nick Chaplin. A third guitarist named Christian Savill, previously of the band Eternal, joined when he became the only person to answer an advert from the band. The ad called for a female guitarist, but Savill wanted to join so badly he offered to wear a dress. He was subsequently recruited. The name "Slowdive" was inspired by a dream Chaplin experienced, and a conversation he had with Goswell, who mentioned "Slowdive", the name of a single by one of her favourite bands, Siouxsie and the Banshees. Goswell later said that she was outvoted for the choice of the name in the end.

The band quickly recorded a demo and several months later played a show at Reading nightclub The After Dark Club with the band Five Thirty. Steve Walters, head of A&R at EMI, attended the show. Afterward, he approached Savill and requested one of their demos. Slowdive signed a recording contract with Creation Records shortly after. The average age of the band was 19 at the time. Sell felt things were progressing too fast and left for university after being in the band for about six months.

A self-titled EP was released in November 1990 and received praise from music critics. Slowdive was actually their original demo; the band had preferred the older recordings after feeling disillusioned with their studio craft. In a glowing recommendation, NME staff member Simon Williams wrote "Slowdive have banished the barrier restricting creativity... When they really relax, Slowdive can make Cocteau Twins sound like Mudhoney". Melody Maker awarded the EP its "Single of the Week" award, an accolade the band's next two EPs received.

Drummer Neil Carter joined from fellow Reading band The Colour Mary in time to play on the Morningrise EP, but left prior to its release in February 1991. Simon Scott took over on drums after his previous group, an alternative rock band called the Charlottes, broke up. The Holding Our Breath EP followed in June 1991, reaching No. 52 in the UK Albums Chart, while the single "Catch the Breeze" topped the UK Indie Chart.

=== 1991–1992: Just for a Day ===
By mid-1991, Slowdive had been tagged a "shoegazing" band and part of "the scene that celebrates itself" by the British media. The term shoegazer was applied to bands that followed My Bloody Valentine's example of abrasive guitars and ethereal vocals, while "the scene" represented these like-minded groups and their social behaviour; shoegazers typically mingled at each other's gigs. Slowdive toured with other shoegazing bands through summer 1991. The British music press became increasingly derisive of shoegazing as the Britpop and grunge movements came underway.

Production on Slowdive's debut commenced shortly after Halstead convinced Alan McGee, head of Creation Records, that the band had enough songs written for a full-length album, which was not actually true. The group hurriedly wrote songs in the studio. Experimentation with sounds and cannabis occurred during the process. Halstead drew lyrical inspiration from the abstract nature of the music. He recounted, "[We] went into a studio for six weeks and had no songs at the start and at the end we had an album".

Their debut, Just for a Day, was released in September 1991 and placed in the top 10 on the UK Indie Chart. NME gave the record a positive review, but most of the press generally disliked the album as a backlash against shoegazing began. As writer Peter Buckley put it, the album was "dismissed as dreary and lacking in ideas". Melody Maker writer Paul Lester railed against the debut, calling it a "major fucking letdown". This backlash worsened when critics reevaluated shoegazing after the release of My Bloody Valentine's Loveless in November 1991.

A tour of the United Kingdom followed in autumn 1991. Afterward, the group made their first visit to the United States and toured with alternative rock band Blur. A tour of Europe followed in February 1992. Slowdive's US label SBK Records planned to release Just for a Day at the beginning of the year, but not before initiating a viral marketing campaign. The band's name was stenciled outside MTV and radio stations in New York. Fans stencilled their heads when Slowdive played in Manhattan. The campaign caused some controversy when a statue celebrating the end of slavery was unveiled and had the word "Slowdive" stencilled on it. SBK eventually pushed the release date back three months, which hurt the viral campaign.

=== 1992–1994: Souvlaki ===
Slowdive: "When the Sun Hits"
from the band's second studio album Souvlaki (1993)

While they toured in early 1992 to support Blue Day, a re-release of their early EP material, the band began writing songs for a follow-up album, but the negative coverage Slowdive received in the press affected their songwriting. "[It] did affect us as we were all teenagers at the time", said Scott in a 2009 interview, "[We] couldn't understand why people were so outraged by our sound that they had to tell the NME or whoever that they wanted us dead!" Approximately 40 songs were recorded and rerecorded as the group became very self-conscious of their writing and how it might be received. When McGee listened to the new material, he subsequently dismissed it, stating, "They're all shit". The band discarded all the music and started over. In a 2009 interview, Halstead vividly recalled the incident: "I remember going to start the record in a studio in Bath. Spiritualized had just been there and left a huge Scalextric in the live room. I remember thinking this was the height of indulgence! Ironically we scrapped everything we recorded...we had to start the record again back in Oxfordshire. We should have just played with the Scalextric for a month".

When the band returned to the UK, they wrote a letter to ambient visionary Brian Eno and requested he produce their second studio album. Eno responded and told them he liked their music, but wanted to collaborate, not produce. Halstead later called the recording session "one of the most surreal stoned experiences of [his] life". "The first thing he did when he walked into the studio was to rip the clock off the wall and put it by the mixing desk", Halstead remembered. "He then said 'Okay, you're going to play the guitar and I'm going to record it. I don't care what you are going to play, just play something.'" Two songs from the collaboration appeared on the ensuing album: "Sing", which was co-written with Eno, and "Here She Comes", where Eno played keyboards.

Creation Records wanted Slowdive to produce a commercial-sounding album. Halstead agreed: "We wanted to make a 'pop' record but it took a while to record". At one point, Halstead suddenly left in summer 1992, seeking seclusion in a Welsh cottage. Savill, Chaplin and Scott were left in a recording studio in Weston-super-Mare, and while waiting for Halstead's return, recorded some "joke songs". To their misfortune, McGee acquired them and became despondent, by which time Halstead had arrived with new music, including "Dagger" and "40 Days". The band named their second studio album Souvlaki after a skit performed by the Jerky Boys, an American comedy duo that recorded prank phone calls.

Souvlaki was released in May 1993 alongside the EP Outside Your Room, a few months after Suede released their popular debut and the Britpop movement began. Critical reaction, as with their previous album, was generally negative. NME writer John Mulvey gave an ambivalent review. Despite noting their dated and "unfulfilling" sound, he did call it an "exemplary product". Dave Simpson, writing for Melody Maker, declared, "[This] record is a soulless void [...] I would rather drown choking in a bath full of porridge than ever listen to it again". To make matters worse, Slowdive booked a tour with fellow shoegazers Catherine Wheel for a tour of the United States, only to find SBK had pushed the album's US release date back eight months. The band recorded an EP, titled 5 EP, and started a modest tour through Europe with dream pop band Cranes. Scott was unhappy with the gap between releases and quit the band in 1994.

A marketing campaign was started in early 1994 to promote Souvlaki in the United States, which AllMusic writer Andy Kellman said would "undoubtedly go down in industry history as one of the laziest ever"; SBK sent fans a release flyer and were told that if they copied and posted 50 flyers around town, they would receive a free copy of Souvlaki. Fans who participated had to document their progress with photographs to prove they performed the activity. Halfway through the Souvlaki US tour, SBK pulled their funding and left Slowdive to pay the rest themselves. In 1994, the band funded two small tours of the United States using money raised through the sale of a live tape and a tour programme that mocked the record label.

=== 1994–1995: Pygmalion ===
Scott was replaced on drums by Ian McCutcheon. By the recording of their third and then-final studio album, Pygmalion, Halstead had moved Slowdive away from the dreamy guitar sound and warm yet solemn tone of earlier releases to a newer, more minimalist extreme, similar to heavily ambient bands such as Seefeel, A.R. Kane and Labradford.

Slowdive were dropped by Creation a week after the release of Pygmalion.

=== 1995–2014: Post-Slowdive endeavours ===
Shortly after being dropped by Creation, Halstead, Goswell and McCutcheon recorded an album of country-influenced songs, and were signed to label 4AD, changing the band name to Mojave 3 to reflect the new musical direction. This group is currently on hiatus.

Drummer Scott went on to form Televise, taking the ambient shoegazing sound and pushing it into electronic fields similar to Fennesz. He joined Lowgold in 1999. Scott later went on to release solo records on the 12k, Miasmah, Sonic Pieces and Kompakt labels, and co-write and perform with Ghostly International-signed Seattle band the Sight Below.

Savill went on to form Monster Movie, a dream pop group that maintained much of the older Slowdive style. They have released four studio albums and an EP to date. Pre-Slowdive, Savill was in a band called Eternal, which also included Monster Movie member Sean Hewson. In 2019, Christian Savill collaborated with Ryan Graveface and Steve Clarke to form Beachy Head. Recording took place in Savannah and the UK, with Matt Duckworth on drums and Rachel Goswell contributing vocals on several tracks.

Halstead and Goswell have both released solo studio albums on 4AD, and Halstead formed the side project Black Hearted Brother in 2013. Goswell joined the supergroup Minor Victories in 2015.

Halstead also recorded with a side project called Zurich with members of Seefeel and Knives ov Resistance; the trio's sole studio album was released in 2009.

=== 2013–present: Reunion and new albums ===
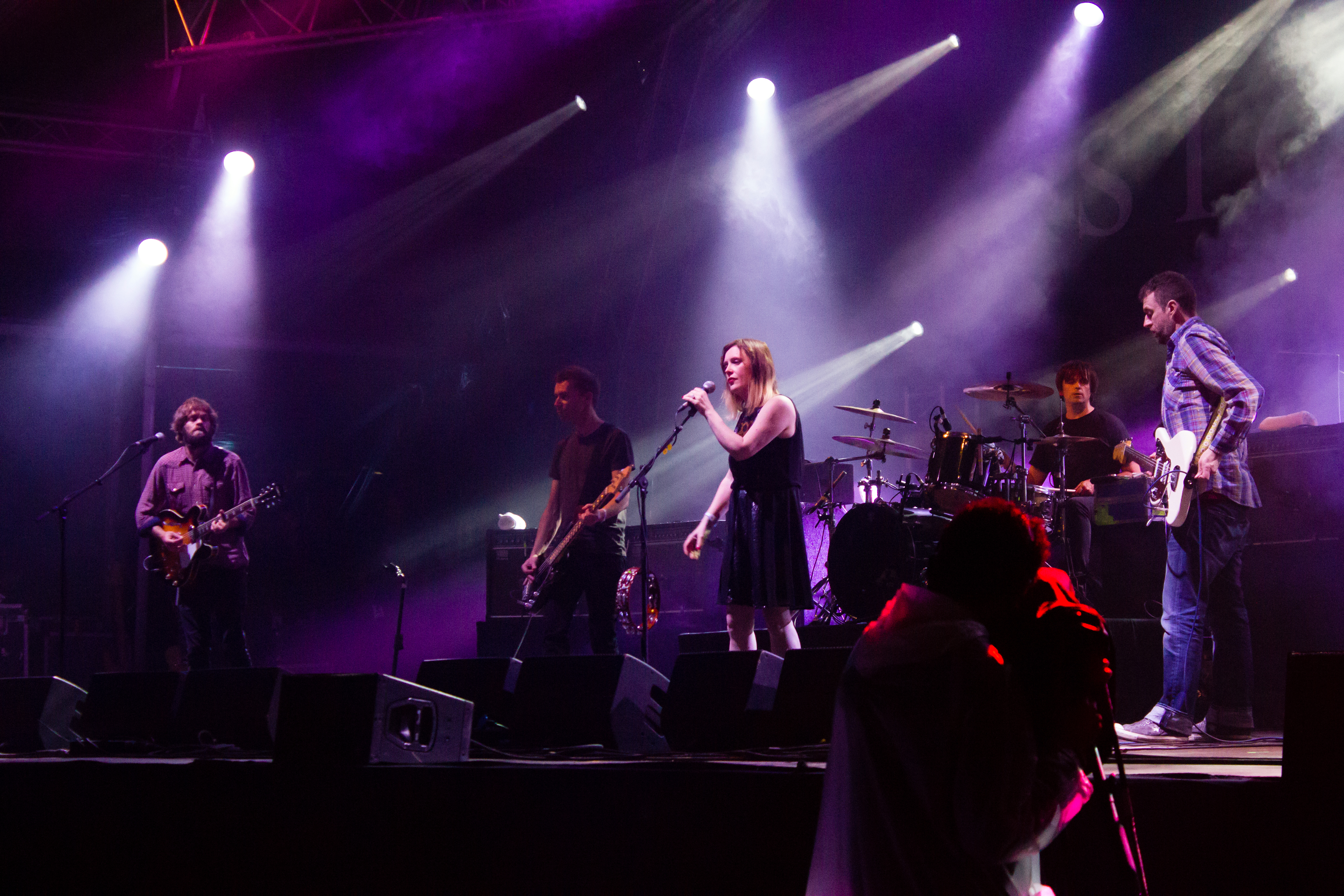
Slowdive performing at Primavera Sound 2014

A Slowdive Twitter account and website were launched in November 2013. Soon after, it was announced that Slowdive had re-formed to play the 2014 Primavera Sound festival in Barcelona. Halstead said that it was the first official reunion offer that the band received, and that their original plan was to reunite for just the one show.

The band slowly added more festival shows for the summer as well as a 20-date North American tour for October and November 2014. Former drummer Simon Scott returned to the band for the reunion. Ian McCutcheon, the band’s final drummer prior to their break-up, who had later joined Halstead and Goswell in Mojave 3, did not return.

In January 2017, Slowdive released "Star Roving", their first single in 22 years, on Dead Oceans. Their self-titled fourth studio album, Slowdive, was released in May 2017, preceded by another single, "Sugar for the Pill".

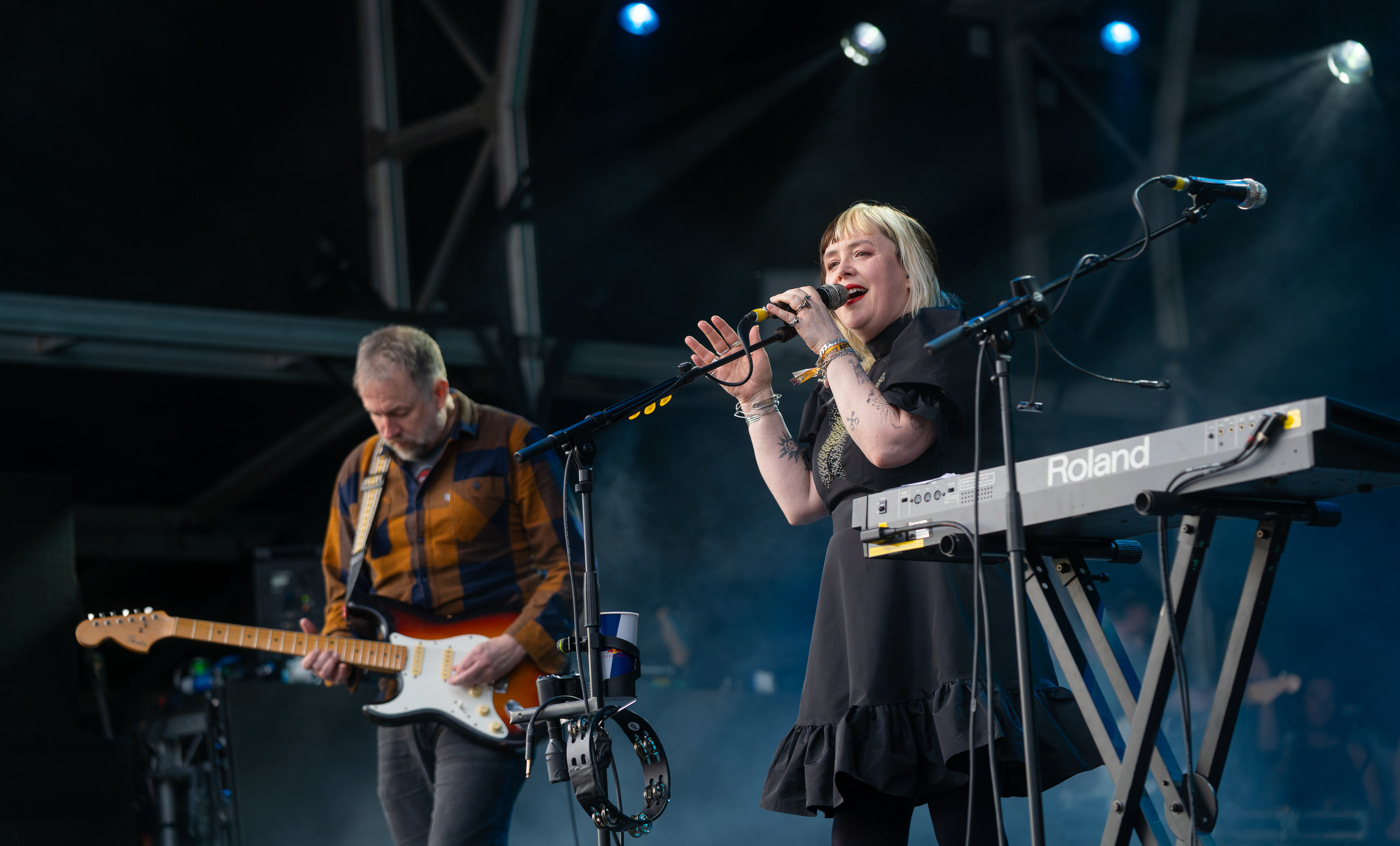
Slowdive performing at Wide Awake Festival in May 2024

In September 2020, Slowdive announced they had begun work on their fifth studio album. In April 2023, the band confirmed on a podcast that they had finished their new album. The lead single, "Kisses", was released on 20 June 2023, and later that month the band played the Glastonbury Festival for the first time. The album's second single, "Skin in the Game", was released on 18 July 2023, followed by "The Slab" and "Alife" in August, and the album Everything Is Alive was released on 1 September 2023. It became the band's first top ten album in any country, doing so in Belgium, Germany, the Netherlands, New Zealand and the United Kingdom.

== Influences and style ==
Music journalist Simon Reynolds wrote that "Halstead was more influenced by Pink Floyd than by the Sex Pistols. Slowdive's formative pop experiences involve post-punk groups like the Cure and Siouxsie and the Banshees, whose artsy approach was closer to '70s progressive groups than punk's angry minimalism". Halstead stated that Slowdive wanted "to create something big and beautiful and sort of timeless". Other names he and Goswell mentioned were David Bowie, the Byrds, the Rolling Stones, Cocteau Twins, My Bloody Valentine and the Jesus and Mary Chain's debut studio album, Psychocandy (1985). Bassist Nick Chaplin's favourite band is the Cure, which also manifested in Slowdive's music.

Their sound has been described as shoegaze, dream pop, and ambient.

== Legacy ==
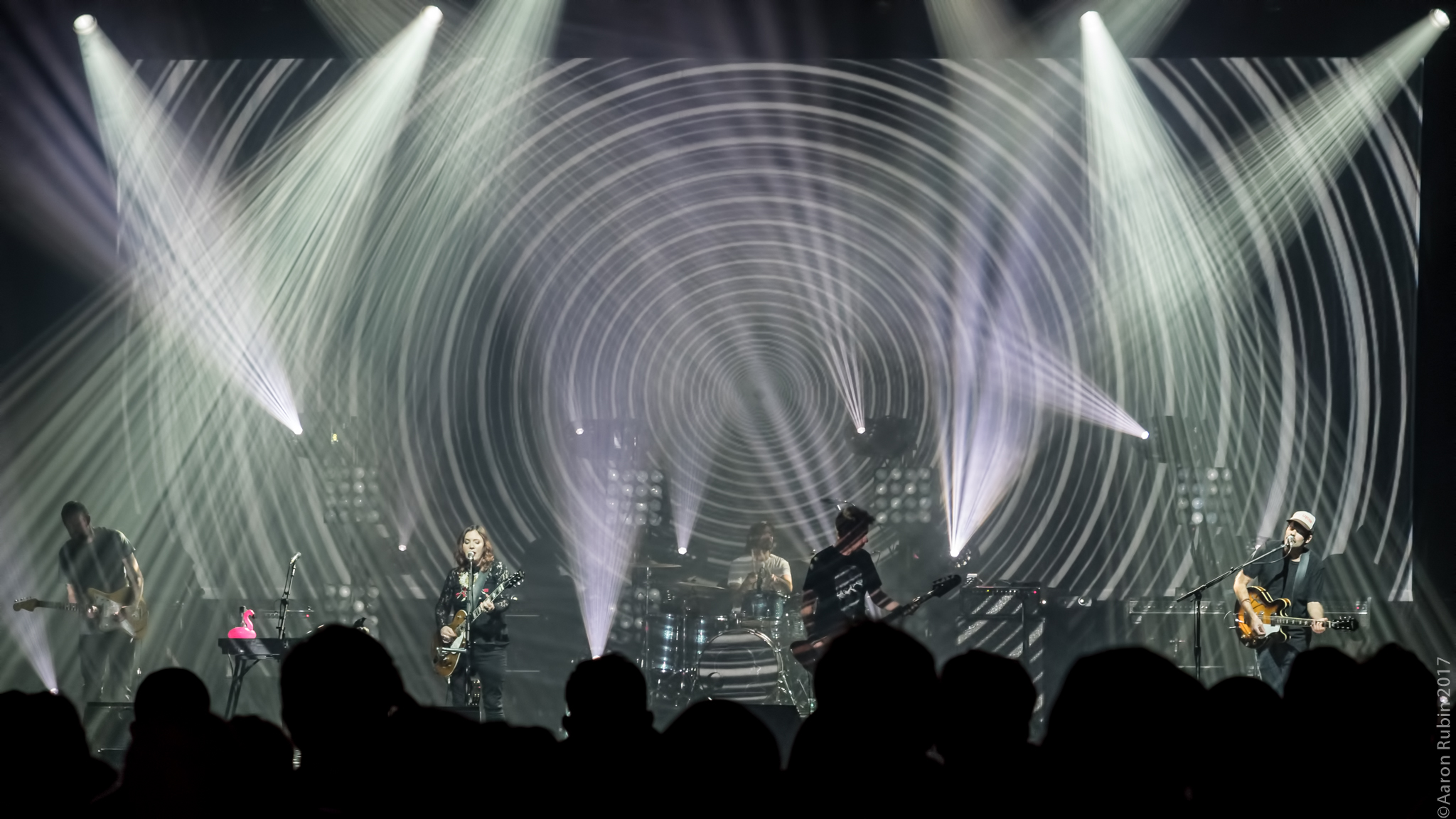
Slowdive at the Fox Theater in Oakland, California, US, 2017

Slowdive were initially dismissed by the British independent music press. While reviews of the band's early extended plays were favourable, Slowdive's reputation took a downturn with the release of their debut album, Just for a Day, which received middling reviews from publications such as Melody Maker and Select. In 1991, Richey Edwards, guitarist and lyricist of Manic Street Preachers, proclaimed: "We will always hate Slowdive more than Hitler." Upon its release, Souvlaki was received similarly negatively; Melody Maker's Dave Simpson infamously wrote, "I would rather drown choking in a bath full of porridge than ever listen to it again", three years after the publication praised the band's EPs for being "impossible, immaculate and serene". The band theorised that they came across as too soft and feminine, and were overshadowed by the emergence of Britpop at the same time. Said Goswell of Britpop: "It was very laddy." About the band's initial poor reviews, Goswell said: "Within about a year of being in the industry, I became very disenchanted, because of the treatment that we got from this small amount of UK journalists. Obviously, they held a lot of power in this country at that point." In 2004, The Independent referred to Slowdive as a "long-forgotten indie band".

The band's reputation was mended by critics throughout the 2010s, who acclaimed Slowdive as one of the best shoegaze bands. Upon Slowdive's re-formation in 2014, the band began playing to larger crowds than they did during their initial run, and members realised that they were more famous and recognisable than ever before. Music writers noted Slowdive's modern popularity as part of shoegaze's revival in popularity with younger Millennials and Generation Z.

== Personnel ==
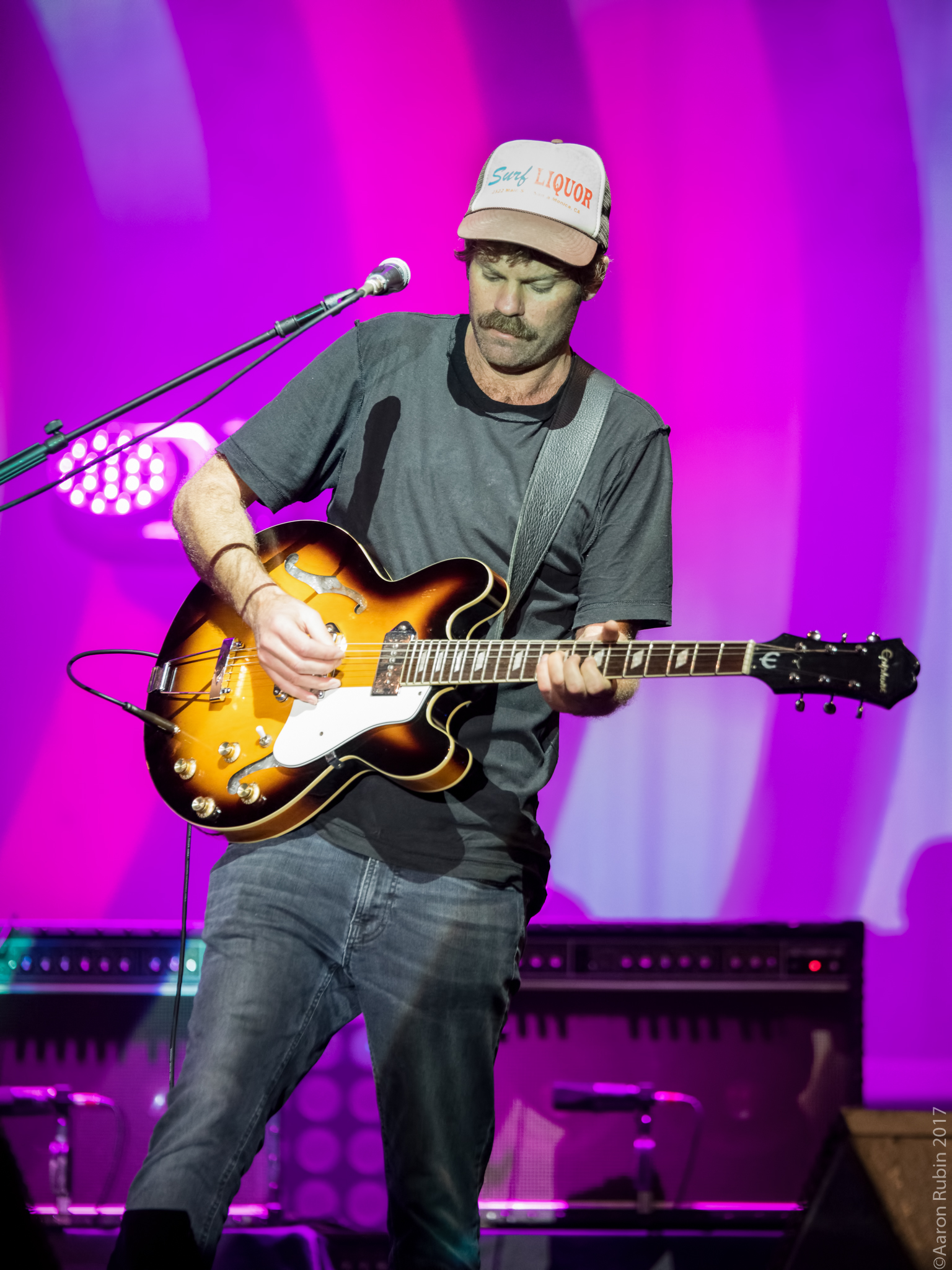
Neil Halstead at the Fox Theater in Oakland, California, US, 2017

Members

- Neil Halstead – vocals, guitar, keyboards (1989–1995, 2013–present)
- Rachel Goswell – vocals, guitar, keyboards, tambourine (1989–1995, 2013–present)
- Christian Savill – guitar (1989–1995, 2013–present)
- Nick Chaplin – bass (1989–1995, 2013–present)
- Simon Scott – drums, percussion (1991–1994, 2013–present); guitar, electronics (2013–present)

Former members

- Adrian Sell – drums, percussion (1989–1990)
- Nick Carter – drums, percussion (1990–1991)
- Ian McCutcheon – drums, percussion (1994–1995)

Touring members

- Nicholas Willes – drums, percussion (2024)

== Discography ==
Studio albums

- Just for a Day (1991)
- Souvlaki (1993)
- Pygmalion (1995)
- Slowdive (2017)
- Everything Is Alive (2023)
