= Souvlaki (album) =

Studio album by Slowdive
- Released: 1 June 1993
- Recorded: 1992
- Studios: Protocol (London); Courtyard (Sutton Courtenay); The White House (Weston-super-Mare)
- Genres: Shoegaze; dream pop
- Length: 40:26
- Label: Creation
- Producer: Slowdive

Slowdive chronology
Outside Your Room (1993)	Souvlaki (1993)	5 (1993)

Singles from Souvlaki
- 1. "Alison" Released: February 1994

Souvlaki is the second studio album by the English alternative rock band Slowdive. It was recorded in 1992, and released on 1 June 1993 through Creation Records.

On its initial release, Souvlaki peaked at number 51 on the UK Albums Chart and was greeted with tepid reviews from critics. It has since received retrospective critical acclaim and has been hailed as a classic of the shoegaze genre.

== Background ==
Prior to the writing of Souvlaki, Slowdive co-vocalists and guitarists Rachel Goswell and Neil Halstead had ended their romantic relationship and Halstead began to spend more time writing songs alone, a process that had been completed by the full band in the past.

The album's title was inspired by a prank call skit by American comedy duo The Jerky Boys, where one of the duo telephones a hotel manager requesting him to perform sexual acts on his wife. Upon learning the manager is Greek, the caller says: "My wife loves that Greek shit... She'll suck your cock like souvlaki."

== Recording ==
While touring Europe in early 1992, Slowdive began tentative work on Souvlaki, writing and recording multiple takes of around 40 potential songs. According to the band's chief songwriter Neil Halstead, these early songs were influenced by Joy Division and David Bowie's Berlin Trilogy. Alan McGee, the head of Slowdive's label Creation Records, was unimpressed by this material and rejected it, though he later decided to give Slowdive full creative control over the album.

After returning to the United Kingdom following a May 1992 tour of the United States, Slowdive contacted Brian Eno, of whom Halstead was a "big" fan, and requested that he produce Souvlaki. While Eno declined, he did agree to spend a few days recording with the band, and out of these sessions came the tracks "Sing" and "Here She Comes". Following the sessions with Eno, Halstead began to take greater influence from ambient music in his songwriting; he has cited Aphex Twin, dub music, and early drum and bass as influences on the track "Souvlaki Space Station".

Halstead was in a fragile emotional state due to his recent breakup with Goswell. At the suggestion of Slowdive's manager, Halstead temporarily exited the recording sessions for Souvlaki in the summer of 1992 and stayed in a rented cottage in rural Wales for around two weeks. In Halstead's absence, only bassist Nick Chaplin and guitarist Christian Savill persisted in recording material, though Savill would later recall that he and Chaplin ended up merely recording several "joke songs". By the time he returned, Halstead had written a new batch of "stark and much more personal" songs, including "Dagger", which would make the final album. He has said that the lyrics he penned during this period were informed by both his solitude in Wales and his feelings about the end of his relationship with Goswell.

Souvlaki was mixed by Ed Buller, who had previously worked with Suede and Spiritualized.

== Release ==
Souvlaki was released on 1 June 1993 through Creation Records. It peaked at number 51 on the UK Albums Chart dated 12 June 1993, 19 places lower than Slowdive's debut studio album Just for a Day (1991), and spent one week on the chart. It was released in the US through SBK Records on 8 February 1994. The US release included four bonus tracks: a previously unreleased cover of "Some Velvet Morning" by Lee Hazlewood and Nancy Sinatra and three tracks from Slowdive's 1993 EP 5.

A two-disc remastered reissue of Souvlaki was released in 2005 by Castle Music, a subsidiary label of Sanctuary Records. The second disc featured the "Some Velvet Morning" cover, two tracks from Slowdive's 1993 Outside Your Room EP, all tracks from 5, and Bandulu and Reload remixes of the 5 track "In Mind". Another two-disc remaster was released by Cherry Red Records on 16 August 2010, featuring the same bonus tracks on the second disc.

== Critical reception ==
Professional ratings
Review scores
Source	Rating
AllMusic	5/5 stars
Chicago Tribune	2/4 stars
NME	6/10
Pitchfork	9.3/10
Q	3/5 stars
Record Collector	5/5 stars
Select	4/5
Uncut (2023)	9/10

Souvlaki was released to mixed reviews from critics. Dave Simpson of Melody Maker wrote: "'Sing' aside, I would rather drown choking in a bath full of porridge than ever listen to it again." John Mulvey of NME reacted with muted praise, calling Souvlaki "another exemplary product from spangly guitar heaven" yet ultimately deeming it a "pretty, but unfulfilled" album. In 2015, Slowdive and Alan McGee stated that they felt that Souvlaki was released at a time when dream pop and shoegaze had become unfashionable and the music press were more interested in Britpop bands such as Oasis.

More recently Souvlaki has been met with more widespread acclaim. In a retrospective review for AllMusic, Jack Rabid praised the album as "quiet, moving, and aggressive simultaneously, mixing trance-like beauty with the deepest delayed guitar sounds around, a sound at once relaxing, soothing, and exciting, and most of all harshly beautiful." Nitsuh Abebe of Pitchfork described it as "a bit of an Essential Slowdive in itself", with songs that are simultaneously "pillowy-soft and passionately deep". Paste's Zach Schonfeld called Souvlaki "the definitive shoegaze statement".

== Legacy ==
In 1999 critic Ned Raggett ranked Souvlaki at number 83 on his list of the best albums of the 1990s for Freaky Trigger. Pitchfork released a documentary about the album in 2015 as part of its Pitchfork Classic series. The following year, the website listed Souvlaki as the second best shoegaze album of all time. Souvlaki has since been recognized as one of the best releases of the 1990s and one of the greatest shoegaze albums of all time by the websites NME and PopMatters.

== Track listing ==
All tracks are written by Neil Halstead, except where noted.

No.	Title	Writer(s)	Length
1.	"Alison"		3:51
2.	"Machine Gun"		4:27
3.	"40 Days"		3:14
4.	"Sing"	Halstead; Nick Chaplin; Rachel Goswell; Christian Savill; Brian Eno	4:48
5.	"Here She Comes"		2:17
6.	"Souvlaki Space Station"	Halstead; Chaplin; Goswell; Savill	5:57
7.	"When the Sun Hits"		4:46
8.	"Altogether"		3:41
9.	"Melon Yellow"		3:52
10.	"Dagger"		3:38
Total length:			40:26

US edition bonus tracks
No.	Title	Writer(s)	Length
11.	"Some Velvet Morning"	Lee Hazlewood	3:22
12.	"Good Day Sunshine"		5:06
13.	"Missing You"		4:15
14.	"Country Rain"	Halstead; Goswell	3:33
Total length:			56:42

2005 reissue bonus disc
No.	Title	Writer(s)	Length
1.	"Some Velvet Morning"	Hazlewood	3:22
2.	"So Tired"		4:02
3.	"Moussaka Chaos"	Halstead; Chaplin; Goswell	6:23
4.	"In Mind"		3:44
5.	"Good Day Sunshine"		5:06
6.	"Missing You"		4:15
7.	"Country Rain"	Halstead; Goswell	3:33
8.	"In Mind" (Bandulu mix)		8:04
9.	"In Mind" (Reload mix)		10:26
Total length:			48:55

== Personnel ==
Credits are adapted from the album's liner notes.

Slowdive

- Neil Halstead – vocals, guitar
- Rachel Goswell – vocals, guitar
- Christian Savill – guitar
- Nick Chaplin – bass guitar
- Simon Scott – drums

Additional musicians

- Brian Eno – keyboards and treatments on "Sing" and "Here She Comes"

Production

- Ed Buller – mixing
- Guy Fixsen – engineering
- Giles Hall – engineering (assistant)
- Chris Hufford – engineering
- Yvette Lacey – engineering (assistant)
- Marcus Lindsay – engineering (assistant)
- Martin Nichols – engineering
- Slowdive – production, mixing
- Andy Wilkinson – engineering

Design

- Steve Double – sleeve photography

== Charts ==
Chart (1993)	Peak position
Dutch Albums (Album Top 100)	79
UK Albums (Official Charts)	51
UK Independent Albums (OCC)	3

Chart (2025–2026)	Peak position
Greek Albums (IFPI)	31
Scottish Albums (Official Charts)	58
