= Ben Gautrey =

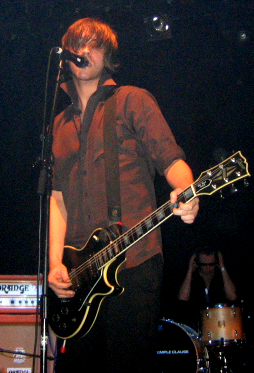

Background information
- Also known as: Ben
- Born: Benedict Gautrey; 21 November 1980 (age 45); Tokyo, Japan
- Genres: Alternative rock
- Occupations: Musician
- Instruments: Vocals, guitar
- Years active: 1998–present

Benedict "Ben" Gautrey (born 21 November 1980) is an English singer-songwriter, formerly the frontman of the band The Cooper Temple Clause. He currently fronts Type Two Error.

Gautrey grew up in Reading, Berkshire, but was born in Tokyo, Japan, where his father was, at the time, an employee of the United Nations University.

Following the split of The Cooper Temple Clause, Gautrey became chairman of local amateur cricket club Wokingham Chestnuts Cricket Club, and also became the player manager of Ashridge Park F.C.

Gautrey featured on a track called Brain by Black Onassis, a project started by Christopher Karloff, formerly of Kasabian.

He is currently a member of Type Two Error, with fellow former Cooper Temple Clause bandmate Kieran Mahon.

Gautrey is now managing director at Great Place to Work UK.

Gautrey sings lead vocals on the following Cooper Temple Clause songs:

- "A.I.M."
- "Amber"
- "Been Training Dogs"
- "Before The Moor"
- "Blind Pilots"
- "Damage" (with Daniel Fisher)
- "The Devil Walks in the Sand"
- "Did You Miss Me?"
- "Digital Observations"
- "Film-Maker"
- "Habit of a Lifetime"
- "Head"
- "Homo Sapiens"
- "Let's Kill Music" (with Daniel Fisher & Tom Bellamy)
- "Murder Song"
- "Music Box"
- "New Toys"
- "On. Off. On."
- "Our Eyes Are Bright"
- "Panzer Attack"
- "Promises, Promises"
- "Resident Writer"
- "Safe Enough Distance Away"
- "Talking to a Brick Wall" (with Tom Bellamy)
- "The Lake"
- "The Same Mistakes"
- "Way Out West"
- "Who Needs Enemies?"
- "Written Apology"
