= The Dark Third =

- American release cover

Studio album by Pure Reason Revolution
- Released: 10 April 2006
- Recorded: Fairhazel Studios and RAK Studios
- Genre: Progressive rock
- Length: 55:31
- Label: Holograph
- Producer: Paul Northfield

Pure Reason Revolution chronology
Cautionary Tales for the Brave (2005)	The Dark Third (2006)	Live at NEARfest 2007 (2008)

Alternative cover
- European release cover

Professional ratings
Review scores
Source	Rating
The Guardian	3/5 stars
Metal Storm	8/10 stars
PopMatters	7/10 stars
Sputnik Music	4.5/5 stars

The Dark Third is the first full-length album by Pure Reason Revolution. It was produced by Paul Northfield (Rush, Porcupine Tree, Gentle Giant, Hole) and recorded at Fairhazel Studios and later RAK studios. An earlier single "Apprentice of the Universe" peaked at #74. The title refers to the "Dark Third", the third of a person's life spent asleep and dreaming, with the song on disc 2 "In Aurelia" being based lyrically and thematically around the book Aurelia by Gérard de Nerval.

== Track listing ==
=== Initial U.K. release ===
All tracks written by Jon Courtney unless otherwise specified.

1. "Aeropause" – 5:44
2. "Goshen's Remains" – 5:23
3. "Apprentice of the Universe" – 3:59
4. "The Bright Ambassadors of Morning" – 11:56 (J. Courtney & G. Jong)
5. "The Exact Colour" – 4:03
6. "Voices in Winter / In the Realms of the Divine" – 6:33
7. "Bullitts Dominæ" – 5:20
8. "The Twyncyn / Trembling Willows" – 7:16
9. "He Tried to Show Them Magic! / Ambassadors Return" – 5:17

=== U.S. release ===
A special edition of the album was subsequently released in America, with the following track list:

1. "Aeropause" – 5:04
2. "Goshen's Remains" – 5:45
3. "Apprentice of the Universe" – 4:16
4. "The Bright Ambassadors of Morning" – 11:56
5. "Nimos & Tambos" – 3:44
6. "Voices in Winter / In the Realms of the Divine" – 6:35
7. "Bullitts Dominæ" – 5:22
8. "Arrival / The Intention Craft" – 8:53
9. "He Tried to Show Them Magic! / Ambassadors Return" – 5:17
10. "Asleep Under Eiderdown" – 3:00

The last song appears as a hidden track after about 5 minutes of silence.

=== Europe release ===
In Europe, the German Progressive Rock label InsideOut released the album almost a year after its initial release, on February 16, 2007. The album contained the same track listing as the U.S. version, but was packaged with a bonus CD with the following track listing:

1. "In Aurélia" – 3:59
2. "Borgens Vor" – 4:17
3. "The Exact Colour" – 4:05
4. "The Twyncyn / Trembling Willows" – 7:16
5. "Golden Clothes" – 7:31

== Credits ==
- Jon Courtney – Vocals, Guitar, Programming, Bass and Keyboards
- Chloe Alper – Vocals & Bass
- Andrew Courtney – Drums & Percussion
- James Dobson – Vocals, Bass, Keyboards, Programming and Violin
- Gregory Jong – Vocals, Guitar and Keyboards
- Jamie Willcox – Vocals & Guitar
- Paul Northfield – Production (with Pure Reason Revolution) & Engineering
- Dario Dendi – Assistant Engineer
