= Seijas =

Seijas is a surname. Notable people with the surname include:

- Álvaro Seijas (born 1998), Venezuelan baseball player
- Antonio Seijas (born 1976), Spanish art historian, illustrator, photographer, painter, and author of comic books
- Ernesto García Seijas (1941–2023), Argentine comics artist
- Gabriel Seijas (born 1994), Argentine footballer
- Luis Manuel Seijas (born 1986), Venezuelan footballer
- Miguel Seijas (born 1930), Uruguayn rower
- Rafael Seijas (fl. 1861–1898), Venezuelan politician

== See also ==
- Seija, given name
