= Antonio Seijas =

Spanish illustrator

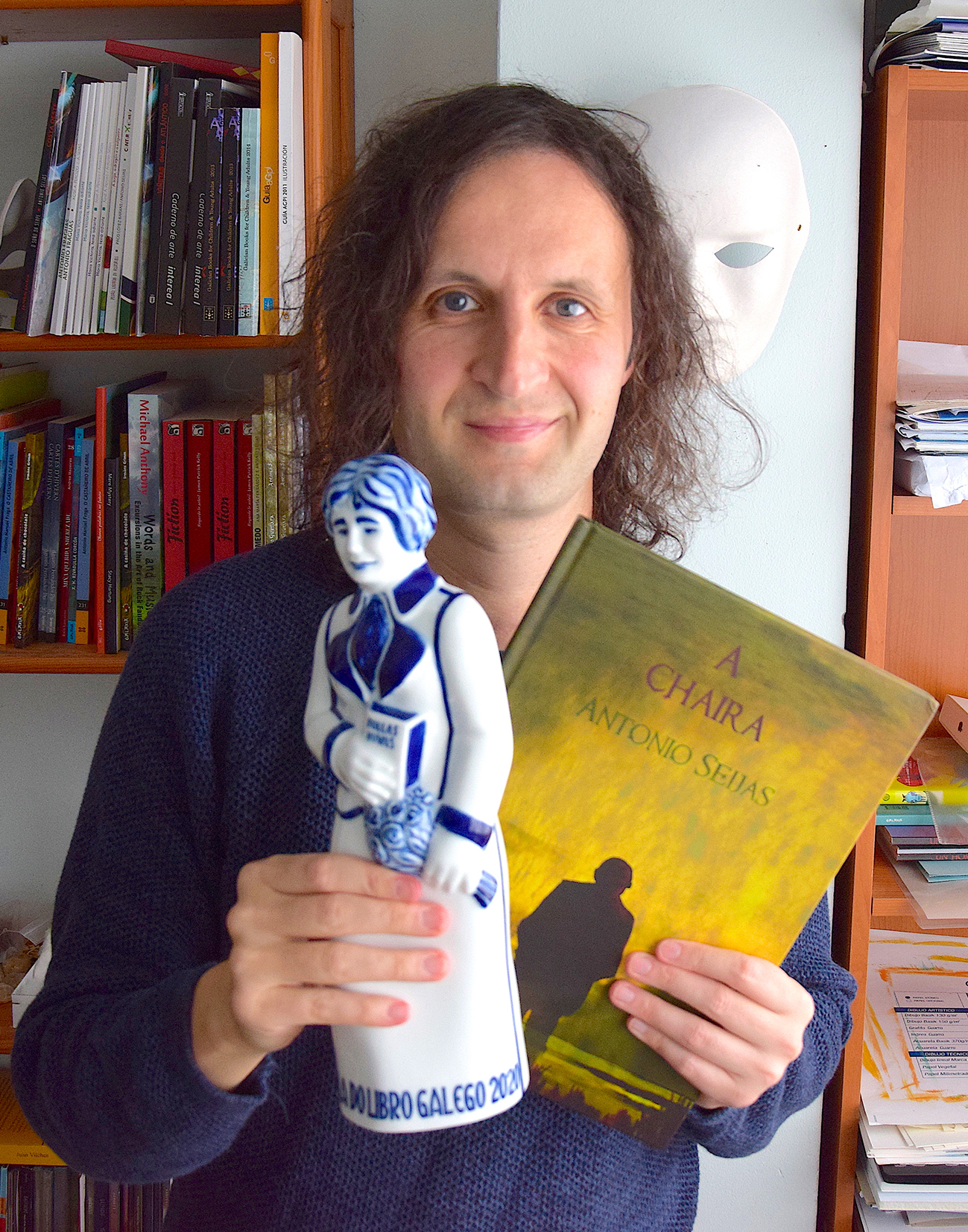
- Galician illustrator and writer, Antonio Seijas in his studio, with the best graphic novel award, in Galicia.
- Born: Antonio Seijas Cruz; 19 July 1976 (age 49); Ares, Coruña, Spain
- Occupation: Illustrator

Antonio Seijas Cruz (Ares, Coruña 19 July 1976) is an art historian, illustrator, photographer, painter and author of comic books.

== Biography ==
Degree in Art History by the Santiago de Compostela University (1994-1998), he started his work with caricatures, published in Galician magazines as Golfiño e Murguía

His first work was released in 2006 under the title Un Hombre Feliz , with foreword by Miguelanxo Prado. In October 2012, it adapted the work of Agustín Fernández, Cartas de Inverno. La Luz is his third work, published in March 2014, and this is the winner of the best comic book in Spain. He is the illustrator of Miña querida Sherezade written by Andrea Maceiras, winner of the Moira Award in 2014. and the book Castañeiro de Abril, by Antonio Fraga. O Soño da Serpe is his first novel, with events in his homeland. It is suitable for youth and adult audiences.
In the musical area, he is best known for his work on album covers for musicians. He has designed the artwork for every album of Norwegian band Gazpacho (band) since 2005's Firebird. Another good example is Happiness Is the Road from the band Marillion. Furthermore he illustrated albums from bands Discanto, Harvest, The Wishing Tree, Nine Stones Close, John Jowitt's arK, 50 Hz and The Dave.

In 2020, he won the award for best graphic novel, with the bookA Chaira, a particularly ambitious work, with literature, drawing and a fantastic book design.

== Illustration ==
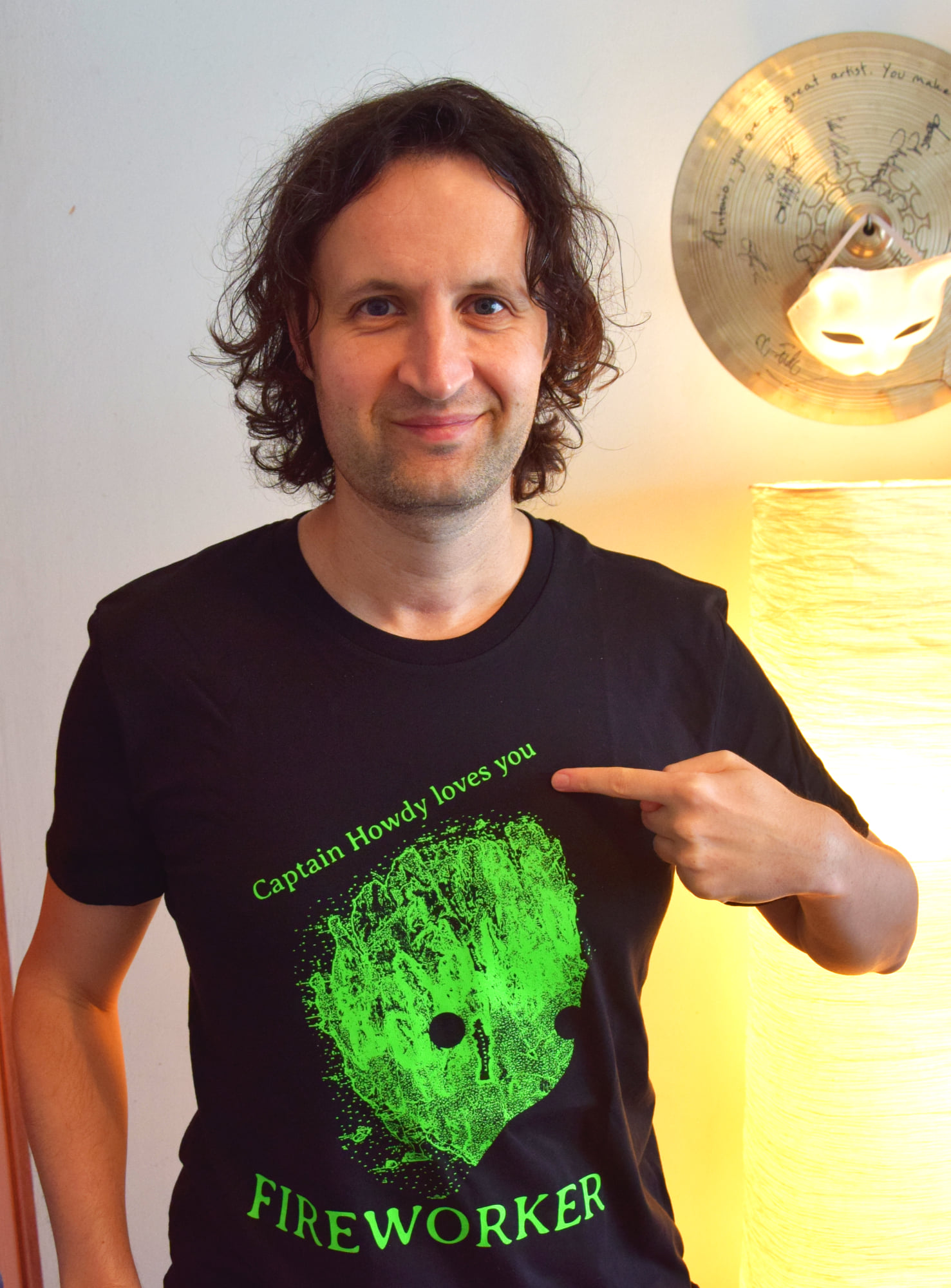
Antonio Seijas with his t-shirt related to the album Fireworker by the band Gazpacho

His art was exhibited in several places. He created logos for David Lynch Foundation Music. He made part of different charitable initiatives, such as 4 Canciones de hambre y esperanza and Canción para un niño en la calle, a campaign in which he collaborated with artists as Steve Hogarth, Loquillo, Rebeldes, Lesli, Pep Sala and Jorge Lorenzo.

The television series La que se avecina has his paintings. During episodes they are part of the scenario.

== Published works ==
- Magazine Golfiño, number 67, 2003
- Magazine Na Vangarda, number 1 and 2, 2004
- Fanzine of Xornadas, number 13, 2006
- Twilight Collection, number 14 and 47, 2007
- Un Hombre Feliz, 2007
- Book tribute to Joan Manuel Serrat, 2008
- Sorrisos e Boa Colleita, number 1, 2008
- Amar unha serea, 2010
- A casiña de chocolate, 2011
- Winter Letters, 2012
- The Balloon Race, 2012
- O Castañeiro de Abril, 2013
- Mediomedo, 2013
- La Oruga en el Bosque Creciente, 2014
- La Luz, 2014
- La oruga en el bosque creciente, 2014
- Miña querida Sherezade, 2015
- Amar unha serea, 2016
- Miguel tiene un museo, 2017
- Onde vai Carlos?, 2017
- Doce cartas a María Victoria Moreno, 2018
- María Victoria, terra adiante - 2018
- O soño da serpe, 2019
- A auga, o dragón e o salgueiro chorón - 2019
- O gato verde de La Casa de la Troya - 2019
- La voz de los muertos - 2019
- A Chaira - La Llanura - 2019

== Works as Illustrator - Music Albums ==
- Firebird (Gazpacho), 2005
- Night (Gazpacho), 2007
- Happiness Is The Road (Marillion), 2008
- Ostara (The Wishing Tree), 2009
- Tick Tock (Gazpacho), 2009
- 4 Canciones de hambre y esperanza, 2009
- Canción para un niño en la calle, 2009
- Happiness Is Cologne (Marillion), 2009
- Gravity (The Dave), 2010
- Live in Montreal Saturday (Marillion), 2010
- Wild Untamed Imaginings (Ark), 2010
- Missa Atropos (Gazpacho), 2011
- Live in Montreal Sunday (Marillion), 2011
- March of Ghosts (Gazpacho), 2012
- Music That Changes The World (Vários), 2012
- Sounds That Can't Be Made (Marillion), 2012
- Demon (Gazpacho), 2014
- Beyond The Seventh Wave (Silhouette), 2014
- Molok (Gazpacho), 2015
- Leaves (Nine Stones Close), 2016
- Absorption Lines (Jet Black Sea), 2017
- Soyuz (Gazpacho), 2018
- Fireworker (Gazpacho), 2020

== Awards ==
- 2nd place in the cultural competition Desafío, 1994
- Awarded at the 7th Cartoonists Competition - 7th Ourense Caricature Biennial, 2004
- Finalist of the Junta de Galicia comic contest, 2004
- 2nd place in the comic contest O Alfaiate, on the website Empuje.net, 2005
- 1st place in the comic contest Ciudad de Dos Hermanas, 2005
- 3rd place in the comic contest Mari Puri Express in Torrejón de Ardoz, 2005
- 2nd placed on X Certame from Arteixo, 2005
- Winner of II Premio Castelao da Deputación da Coruña con "Un home feliz", 2006
- Un hombre feliz - Best Script Award, Salón del Comic de Barcelona, 2008
- Winter Letters - Isaac Días Pardo Award for Best Illustrated Book in Galicia, 2012
- La Luz - Named best national work of 2014 in Expocomic
- A Chaira - Named Best Graphic Novel of 2020 - Gala do Libro Galego
