= Demon (album) =

Studio album by Gazpacho
- Released: 17 March 2014
- Genre: Progressive rock; alternative rock
- Length: 45:46
- Label: Kscope
- Producer: Gazpacho

Gazpacho chronology
March of Ghosts (2012)	Demon (2014)	Night of the Demon (2015)

Demon is the eighth studio album by Norwegian rock band Gazpacho. It was released on 17 March 2014 in the United Kingdom and on 1 April 2014 in the United States by Kscope.

== Concept ==
Gazpacho described Demon as "the most complicated and strange album we’ve ever made". It was inspired by "the mad ramblings left behind by an unknown tenant in an apartment in Prague". According to the band:

The manuscript contained various ramblings and diagrams which formed the basis of a diary of sorts. The unknown author claimed to have discovered the source of what he called an evil presence in the world.

This presence, ‘The Demon,’ was an actual intelligent will, with no mercy and a desire for evil things to happen. The author wrote as if he had lived for thousands of years stalking this presence, and the manuscript included references to outdated branches of mathematics, pagan religions and an eyewitness account of the bubonic plague.

The thought of this mysterious figure who had lived through the ages hunting the ‘Demon’ seemed like too good an idea not to write about.

Record label Kscope compared Demon to the band's two previous albums, Missa Atropos and March of Ghosts, noting that it continues the band's "tradition of telling rich stories through the course of the album".

== Critical reception ==
Professional ratings
Review scores
Source	Rating
PopMatters	8/10 stars
Prog	Positive

Writing for PopMatters, Brice Ezell described Demon as "a dignified recording, [which] reaches the grandeur of a classical composition without gunning for the same tropes that most prog bands would to achieve the same", and "an album—a concept album, no less—that even the average indie fan could warm up to", noting that it "does exactly what its title implies: it haunts".

Emphasising the lengths of some of the album's tracks, Prog Magazine's Emma Johnston described Demon as "surely as defiantly prog as it’s possible to get today", while noting that the album's "queasy, chilly drama is offset with a sense of true beauty", with particular praise directed to vocalist Jan Henrik Ohme's performance.

== Track listing ==
No.	Title	Length
1.	"I've Been Walking"	9:47
2.	"The Wizard of Altai Mountains"	4:53
3.	"I've Been Walking (Part 2)"	12:30
4.	"Death Room"	18:46
Total length:		45:46

Limited Edition Bonus Track
No.	Title	Length
5.	"The Cage"	3:44

== Personnel ==
Credits as per Discogs.

Gazpacho

- Jan Henrik Ohme – vocals
- Thomas Andersen – keyboards
- Mikael Krømer – violin, mandolin
- Kristian "Fido" Torp – bass
- Jon-Arne Vilbo – guitar
- Lars Erik Asp – drums, percussion

Additional musicians

- Stian Carstensen – accordion, banjo
- Charlotte Bredesen – vocals (as part of choir) on "I've Been Walking (Part 2)"

Other

- Gazpacho – production; mixing (except "The Cage")
- David Bottrill – mixing on "The Cage"
- Thor Legvold – mastering
- Antonio Seijas – artwork, design
