= Gautrey =

Gautrey is a surname. Notable people with the surname include:

- Ben Gautrey (born 1980), English singer-songwriter
- Peter Gautrey (1918–2014), British diplomat
- Rex Gautrey (1928–2001), English cricketer
- Thomas Gautrey (1852–1949), British politician

== See also ==
- Gaudry, surname
- Lannick Gautry (born 1976), French actor
