= Period pains =

Period pains may refer to:

- Dysmenorrhea, the pain associated with menstruation
- Period Pains (band), a UK indie-punk band of the 1990s
