= Amor Vincit Omnia (album) =

Studio album by Pure Reason Revolution
- Released: 9 March 2009
- Genre: Progressive rock, electronic rock, electronica
- Length: 45:24
- Label: Superball Music

Pure Reason Revolution chronology
Live at NEARfest 2007 (2008)	Amor Vincit Omnia (2009)	Hammer and Anvil (2010)

Professional ratings
Review scores
Source	Rating
Gigwise	2/5 stars
Gothtronic	8/10
Metal Storm	7.9/10
Music-News	5/5 stars
Rock Sound	6/10
Sputnikmusic	4/5 stars
Strange Glue	6/10 stars

Amor Vincit Omnia is the second full-length album by British progressive rock band Pure Reason Revolution.

The title of the album is Latin for Love Conquers All, alluding to Vergil's famous line from Eclogue 10.69. It is also a reference to the painting Amor Vincit Omnia by the Italian baroque painter Caravaggio, completed circa 1601. The track title Victorious Cupid is also an alternate name of the same painting. Lead singer and songwriter Jon Courtney, however, claims that the album title was derived from his school motto, veritas vincit omnia (truth conquers all).

The album introduces a more electronic sound than the first album. The band makes heavy use of synths, most noticeably on "Les Malheurs" and "Deus ex Machina". The album cover and artwork have been designed by band member Chloe Alper.

The lyric, "Did you feel loved? Did you ever burn Avalon?" is repeated on several tracks on the album including "Deus Ex Machina", "Disconnect" and "AVO".

== Track listing ==
1. "Les Malheurs" : 5:02
2. "Victorious Cupid" : 3:39
3. "I) Keep Me Sane/Insane" : 0:55
4. "II) Apogee III) Requiem for the Lovers" : 5:22
5. "Deus Ex Machina" : 5:40
6. "Bloodless" : 4:55
7. "Disconnect" : 5:54
8. "The Gloaming" : 9:10
9. "AVO" : 4:47

== Personnel ==
- Jon Courtney > Vocals, Guitar, Programming, Bass and keyboards
- Chloe Alper > Vocals & Keyboard
- Jamie Willcox > Vocals, Guitar
- Paul Glover > Drums
