= The Bright Ambassadors of Morning =

Single by Pure Reason Revolution
- A-side: "The Bright Ambassadors of Morning"
- B-side: "none"
- Released: 11 April 2005
- Genre: New prog
- Label: Holograph imprint via Sony BMG
- Songwriter(s): Jon Courtney, Greg Jong

Pure Reason Revolution singles chronology
"Apprentice of the Universe" (2004)	"The Bright Ambassadors of Morning" (2005)	"The Intention Craft" (2005)

"The Bright Ambassadors of Morning" is a song and single by the British new prog band Pure Reason Revolution from the mini-album Cautionary Tales for the Brave. The title refers to lyrics from the Pink Floyd song, Echoes.

It is the highest-charting single effort of the band to date, reaching number 68 in the official UK singles chart.

== Track listing ==
1. "The Bright Ambassadors of Morning" - 11:50
