= Tom Bellamy =

Background information
- Birth name: Thomas Rhys Bellamy
- Born: 18 February 1980 (age 45)
- Origin: Haverfordwest, Wales
- Genres: Alternative rock
- Occupation(s): Musician, songwriter
- Instrument(s): Vocals, guitar, keyboards
- Years active: 1998–present
- Website: http://www.tombellamy.co.uk

Thomas Rhys Bellamy is a British musician. He is the multi-instrumentalist responsible for contributing guitar, bass, synthesizer, keyboards, trumpet, programming, samples, melodica, harmonica, percussion, toy piano, bowed guitar, decks, FX/beats, vocals and lyrics in the band the Cooper Temple Clause. He is also a keen DJ and has remixed several songs by the Cooper Temple Clause as part of his side project, Rhysmix. Following the split of the band, Bellamy has turned his full attention to remixing and DJing under the Rhysmix alias. He is currently collaborating with DJ Eddy Temple-Morris under the name Losers, remixing and producing music in the Bleak House, a studio in rural Berkshire that formerly housed the Cooper Temple Clause.

Originally the lead guitarist of the band, Bellamy began to experiment with guitar pedals, synthesisers and a variety of other instruments, passing the role of lead guitarist to bandmate Dan Fisher. He wrote the lyrics to "Talking to a Brick Wall", "Into My Arms" and "In Your Prime" for their 2003 album Kick Up the Fire, and Let the Flames Break Loose.

Prior to the release of 2007's Make This Your Own, songs featuring Bellamy on lead vocals tended to be B-sides; however the band's third album saw an increase in the number of tracks he contributed lead vocals to.

== Rhysmix ==
Rhysmix (pronounced "Reesemix") is Bellamy's DJing alias. The name is a pun on the word "remix" and Bellamy's Welsh middle name, Rhys.

Bellamy's origins as a guitar player led to his growing interest in the potential of guitar pedals in developing sound and distortion. Bellamy eventually expanded into keyboards and synthesisers, gradually beginning to represent The Cooper Temple Clause as a DJ at post-gig slots (with bandmate Jon Harper) and other events offered to him. Regular sets allowed Bellamy an insight into dance/rock remixes, progressing from the electro-based contributions he continued to contribute to The Cooper Temple Clause, alongside guitar and vocals.

Throughout the period prior to the release of the band's third studio album Make This Your Own, Bellamy was influenced by the music of acts such as Soulwax and Simian Mobile Disco to further pursue remixing. Bellamy remixed the band's first single from the new album, Homo Sapiens, calling his production a "rhysmix". The track came to the attention of radio DJ Eddy Temple-Morris and began receiving weekly airplays on XFM's remix show; The Remix. It was also included in the notable "remix bombs" of the year on XFM. These early successes inspired Bellamy to remix some of the band's other singles, including "Waiting Game" and "Head", the latter remix being released as an official track on the Cooper Temple Clause's Head EP in 2007.

In January 2007, Temple-Morris collaborated with Bellamy in the studio to remix "Check" by Belgian band Goose. The partnership mixed Bellamy's love of electro music with Temple-Morris's passion for Pendulum-esque hooks. The "rhysmix" of "Head" prompted Temple-Morris to invite Bellamy to do a half-hour Superchunk mix on London-based radio station XFM, which comprised a selection of Bellamy's favourite influences. These included artists such as Teenage Badgirl and newcomers Does It Offend You, Yeah?.

Following the split of the Cooper Temple Clause in April 2007, Bellamy began writing original material under the alias of Rhysmix, including the track "Feared by the Other Children". The demise of his old band prompted Bellamy to continue to pursue his musical interests through the medium of Rhysmix, a premise supported by an increasing number of DJ sets under his new alias. Early Rhysmix sets included a slot in The Remix night at London's Cargo club in May 2007, as well as the launch night of Reading's "neOn" club night in early June. Bellamy continued to collaborate with Temple-Morris on several more remix tracks, including Alex Gopher's "The Game", "Listen Up!" by the Gossip and "The Sound of Music" by My Luminaries.

== Other work ==
Bellamy worked with Jon Courtney writing and producing the 2010 Pure Reason Revolution album Hammer and Anvil.

In September 2012, he worked on a project called Mutation on the album Error 500 with Ginger Wildheart, and is credited with contributions to four tracks, namely "Bracken" (backing vocals), "White Leg" (backing vocals), "Mutation" (guitar, programming & keys, backing vocals), and "Benzo Fury" (programming & keys).
