= Chloe Alper =

British musician

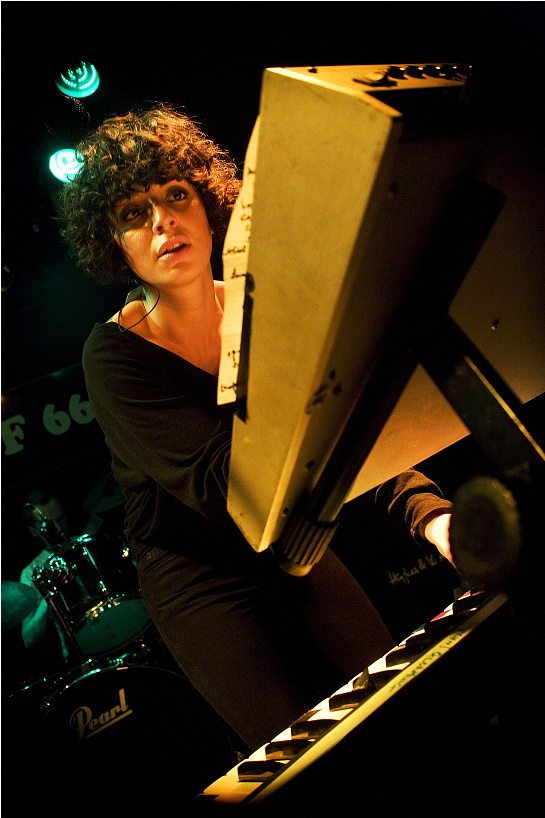
- Chloe Alper (2008)

Background information
- Born: 13 September 1981 (age 45)
- Origin: Reading, Berkshire, England
- Genres: Progressive rock; alternative rock; new prog
- Instruments: Vocals; bass; Guitar; keyboard
- Years active: 1997–present
- Member of: Pure Reason Revolution; James; Tiny Giant
- Formerly of: Period Pains
- Website: tinygiantmusic.com

Chloë Alper (born 13 September 1981) is a British singer, songwriter, vocal arranger and multi-instrumentalist. She is a member of the English rock band James and has contributed vocal arrangements to several of the band's recordings, including their 2023 orchestral album Be Opened By the Wonderful, their 2024 studio album Yummy and two newly recorded tracks on their 2026 compilation album Nothing but Love - The Definitive Best Of. Be Opened By the Wonderful features orchestral and choral reworkings of songs throughout James' career, while Yummy reached number one on the UK's Official Albums Chart. She is also a founding member of British new prog rock group Pure Reason Revolution. Alper began her music career in 1996 when she cofounded Riot grrrl punk band Period Pains. Her solo release Juno featured on the original motion picture soundtrack to Maniac, while "True Love", is the title track of the American supernatural horror film Amityville: The Awakening.

== Biography ==
=== Period Pains ===
Born 13 September 1981, from the age of 13, Alper fronted the cult Riot grrrl punk band Period Pains, based in Reading. The band formed in 1995 with Alper on vocals, Felicity Aldridge on guitar, Laura Warwick on bass and Laura Viney on drums. Viney was later replaced by Magdalena (Magda) Przybylski.

Their 1997 anti-Spice Girls single, "Spice Girls (Who Do YOU Think You Are?)", was released on Damaged Goods. The disc received airplay from John Peel, for whom they later recorded a session which was later released as an EP. The band were highlighted by John Peel in his Festive 50 for 1997. The band were covered by publications including The Daily Mail and Just 17 but only played a few live shows, notably opening in the Dr Martens tent for the 1997 Reading Festival.

=== Pure Reason Revolution ===
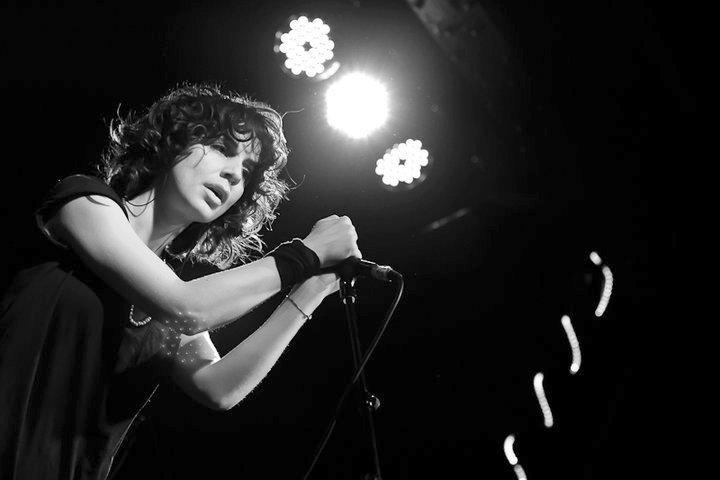
Alper performing with Pure Reason Revolution

Alper then joined Reading-based band The Sunset Sound, which eventually became Pure Reason Revolution, contributing vocals, picking up the bass guitar later after the previous bassist left. Alper also plays keyboards, including a midi sample-triggering keyboard during live performances. In shows in 2010 and 2011 she also played an Epiphone SG guitar on certain tracks.

The band signed to Alan McGee's Poptones label for a one-off release of "Apprentice of the Universe", which peaked at number 12 in the indie charts. Signing to Sony BMG in autumn 2004, the following year saw Pure Reason Revolution releasing two singles and one mini-album, followed by the full-length debut The Dark Third in 2006, with producer Paul Northfield. During this time, PRR supported Mew, Hope of the States, Porcupine Tree, Secret Machines and Oceansize, as well as headlining their own gigs, and recorded sessions for Mark Radcliffe's BBC Radio 2 show and XFM.

The band's second album Amor Vincit Omnia was released in March 2009 on Superball Music, and accompanied by an extensive headline tour of Britain and Europe. The band were track of the week on Kerrang! Radio and track of the day in Classic Rock Magazine. The new music was darker and more electronic than previous offerings, qualities that were largely retained for 2010's third studio album, Hammer and Anvil, also released via Superball. Hammer and Anvil opens with a track sung exclusively by Alper, Fight Fire, which received lengthy airtime on XFM and other radio stations.

Pure Reason Revolution split on good terms in November 2011, with members choosing to pursue other projects. A final series of concerts in the UK saw the Dark Third album played in full for the first time. A final EP entitled Valour was also released as a download-only in conjunction with the break up, with proceeds donated to charity.

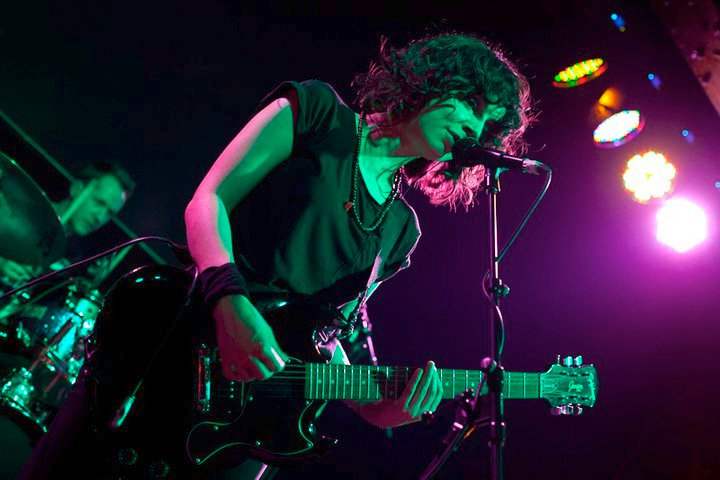
Alper in 2010

On 12 October 2018, Pure Reason Revolution announced that they were re-forming with Jon Courtney and Chloe Alper being the only members of the original lineup to return. Their comeback album, "Eupnea", was released in April 2020 on InsideOut. "Eupnea" reached number three in the Official UK Rock Album Chart.

Alper continued with the band for their next album, Above Cirrus, released 2022, but then left the band.

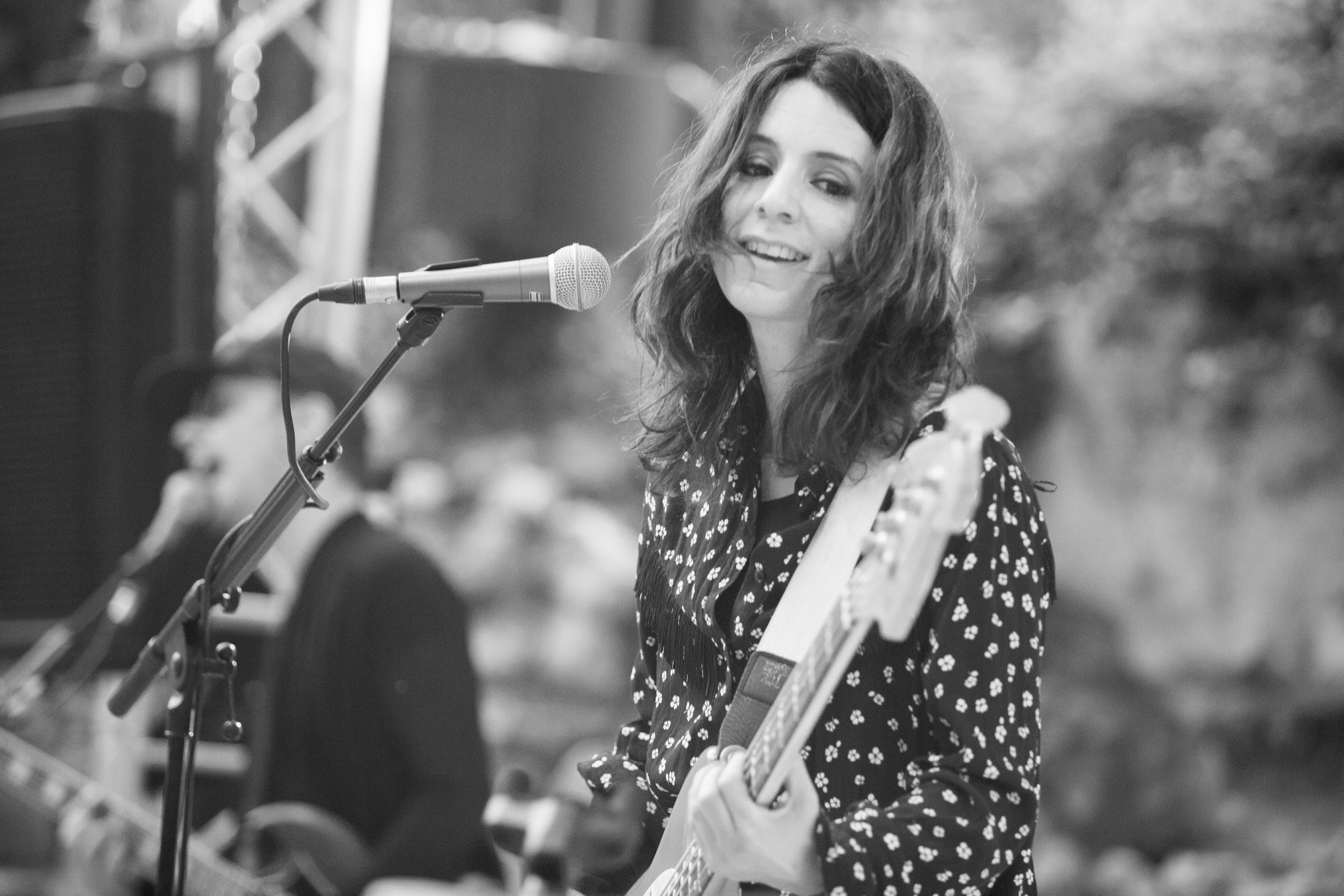
Chloe Alper with Pure Reason Revolution at the Midsummer Prog Festival 2019

=== Solo releases ===
In 2013, Alper began work on a solo project for which she recorded songs in collaboration with Tom Bellamy (of The Cooper Temple Clause and Losers), who worked on Pure Reason Revolution's album Hammer and Anvil) and Robin Coudert (of Phoenix). "Juno", written by Alper and Coudert, is featured on the original motion picture soundtrack to the 2013 film Maniac. "True Love", written by Alper and Coudert featured on the original motion picture soundtrack to the 2017 film Amityville: The Awakening.

=== Tiny Giant ===
In 2015 Alper announced she had formed a new band – Tiny Giant – with her co-writer; the Grammy and MOBO nominated multi-instrumentalist Mat Collis. Their first single "Joely" was released on 9 May 2016 which won them a nomination for the Limelight (New Band) award at the Progressive Music Awards Eon Music. They released a further three singles, School of Hard Knocks, Draw me a Line and Thirsty & Sad. A leaked album track soundtracked Vanity Fair's "Playhouse Presents" series for Sky Arts

== DJ ==
Alper often performs under the pseudonym 'Chloe Ramone'.
