= Who Needs Enemies? =

Who Needs Enemies? may refer to:

- "Who Needs Enemies?" (song), a 2002 song by The Cooper Temple Clause
- Who Needs Enemies? (album), a 1983 album by Henry Kaiser and Fred Frith
