= Apprentice of the Universe =

Single by Pure Reason Revolution
- B-side: "Nimos & Tambos"
- Released: 2004
- Genre: New prog
- Label: Poptones
- Songwriter(s): Jon Courtney

Pure Reason Revolution singles chronology
| "Apprentice of the Universe" (2004) | "The Bright Ambassadors of Morning" (2005) |

"Apprentice of the Universe" is a song and single by the British new prog band Pure Reason Revolution. It was their first official single and the only release on Alan McGee's Poptones label, with B-side "Nimos and Tambos". It peaked at No. 74 on the national chart and was later released on Pure Reason Revolution's debut album The Dark Third. Along with most of the band's material it was composed by the band's lead singer and guitarist Jon Courtney.

== Track listing ==
1. "Apprentice of the Universe" – 3:59
2. "Nimos & Tambos" – 4:03
