= Cautionary Tales for the Brave =

Studio album by Pure Reason Revolution
- Released: 29 November 2005
- Genre: Progressive rock
- Length: 29:35
- Label: Holograph imprint via Sony BMG

Pure Reason Revolution chronology
Cautionary Tales for the Brave (2005)	The Dark Third (2006)

Professional ratings
Review scores
Source	Rating
Allmusic	3.5/5 stars

Cautionary Tales for the Brave is a 2005 mini-album by the British New prog band Pure Reason Revolution. Singer Chloe Alper described the album as "a kind of warm up to The Dark Third". Most of the tracks appear on their debut album The Dark Third, with the exception of "In Aurelia", with Jon Courtney saying that they were initially written to be released on that album before Sony BMG decided to release a mini-album, prompting the band to write more songs.

== Track listing ==
All tracks by Jon Courtney except where noted

1. "In Aurélia" - 3:50
2. "The Bright Ambassadors Of Morning" (Courtney, Greg Jong) - 11:50
3. "Arrival/The Intention Craft" - 8:35
4. "He Tried To Show Them Magic/Ambassadors Return" - 5:30

== Personnel ==
- Jon Courtney - Vocals, Guitar, keyboards
- Chloe Alper - Vocals & Bass
- Andrew Courtney - Drums
- James Dobson - Vocals, Keyboard, Guitar, Bass & Violin
- Greg Jong - Vocals, Guitar
