= Gazpacho (band) =

Norwegian art rock band

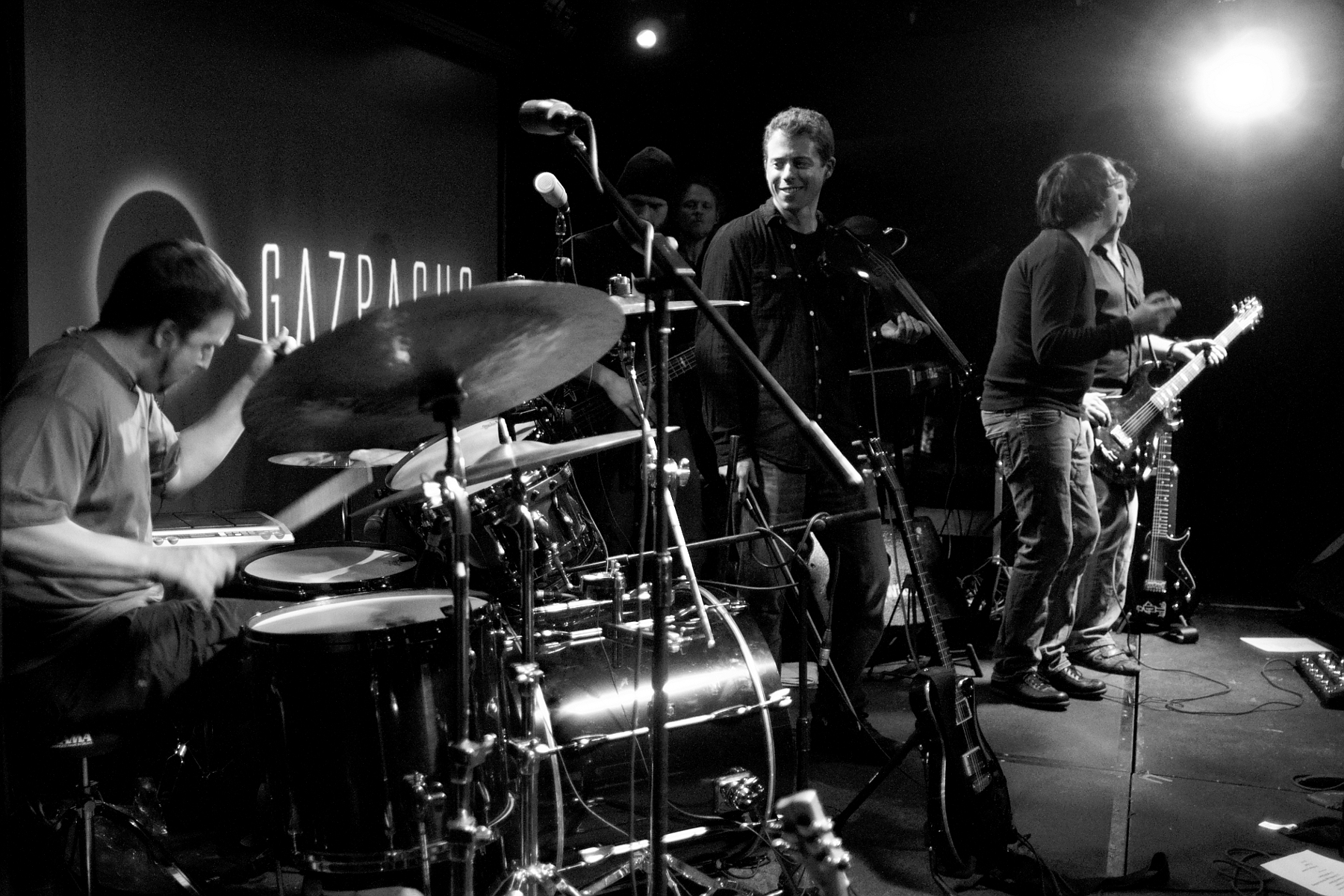
- Gazpacho performing in 2011

Background information
- Origin: Oslo, Norway
- Genres: Art rock; progressive rock; alternative rock; neo-prog; new prog; post-rock
- Years active: 1996–present
- Labels: Happy Thoughts Production, Kscope
- Members: Jan Henrik Ohme; Jon-Arne Vilbo; Thomas Andersen; Mikael Krømer; Kristian Torp; Robert R Johansen
- Past members: Lars Erik Asp; Roy Funner; Geir Digernes
- Website: gazpachoworld.com

Gazpacho are an art rock band from Norway. The original core of the band consisted of Jan-Henrik Ohme (vocals), Jon-Arne Vilbo (guitar), and Thomas Andersen (keyboards, programming, production). They started making music together in 1996, and the band has since expanded with Mikael Krømer (violin, co-producer), Robert R Johansen (drums), and Kristian Torp (bass).

== History ==
=== Early years (1996–2001) ===
Childhood friends Jon-Arne Vilbo and Thomas Andersen had played together in a band called Delerium before, which in their own words "whittled away". After several years of separation, the two friends met again and started making music together again. Andersen had met Jan-Henrik Ohme through his work as radio commercial producer and brought him into the jam sessions, which laid the foundation for Gazpacho as it exists today.

The band name comes from an attempt to describe their music.

Andersen: "We are a very unlikely mixture of people really, not the average types you'd expect to see in the same band... so we thought Gazpacho, which really is the bastard of soups (meshed up vegetables served cold), was the perfect name for our group(...)With Gazpacho you get a surprise, something unexpected, something out of the norm, a 'positive' contradiction. We feel this describes our band very well.".

Roy Funner played bass on the finished recordings of the band, though he wasn't part of the writing process. For the drum tracks, a computer was used.

For two years, the band worked on a concept album, Random Access Memory; a piece of work which they discarded altogether when they felt they had not yet reached the level of musical maturity for such an ambitious project.

=== Make-A-Star and Bravo (2002–2003) ===
All three members of Gazpacho were involved with the Scandinavian branch of Marillion's "the Web" fanclub. This led to Ohme being invited to sing the Marillion track Afraid of Sunlight at the Swap the Band show of the first Marillion Convention Weekend in 2002. At this convention, the band handed out free four-track promos called Get It While It's Cold to anyone interested. These promos also found their way to several internet magazines, which gave the band almost unanimous acclaim, with one reviewer calling the music "expertly-crafted and truly inventive".

In May 2002, Gazpacho entered a song contest on Make-A-Star with the song "Sea of Tranquility", and won. Their second entry, "Ghost", made it to second position, and this was enough to gain them the opportunity to release an album through MP3.com. Get It While It's Cold (37°C) contained three tracks of the promo EP and three new tracks. One of these new songs, "Nemo", saw the band winning the Make-A-Star contest for a second time. The release of the EP continued to garner them international acclaim.

In 2003, Gazpacho released their first studio album, Bravo, which contained five of the six tracks off the MP3.com album and six new compositions. Utilizing the possibilities of the internet, the band had teamed up with the American singer-songwriter and fellow Make-A-Star contestant Esther Valentine and the New Zealand producer Peter Kearns. Valentine sang a duet with Ohme on the song "Novgorod" (which she also co-wrote), and Kearns produced two of the tracks off Bravo. The album gained the band more international acclaim.

Gazpacho was invited to perform at the second Marillion Convention Weekend in 2003. For their live band, the lineup was further expanded with drummer Geir Digernes (who had also played drums on some of the tracks on Bravo) and for the performance of the title track they were joined by Mikael Krømer (violin) and Kristian Skedsmo (flute).

=== Supporting Marillion (2004–2005) ===
The performance at the Convention Weekend led to a support slot on Marillion's 31-date European Marbles tour around 11 countries, further raising Gazpacho's profile. For this tour, Robert Johansen joined the band as the new drummer, and Mikael Krømer and Kristian Skedsmo also joined the live line-up.

Prior to the tour, the band released their second full-length album, When Earth Lets Go, giving them enough material for their live repertoire. On When Earth Lets Go the band collaborated with producer Steve Lyon (Paul McCartney, Depeche Mode, The Cure) who had agreed to produce the track "Substitute for Murder" to see if he could potentially interest any labels. Despite Lyon's involvement, the increased awareness after playing with Marillion, and more rave reviews on their album, Gazpacho was not able to secure a record deal.

Eventually, Marillion offered Gazpacho the chance to release their next album on the band's own Racket Records label. Racket released the band's third album Firebird and re-released Bravo and When Earth Lets Go. The support of Marillion also led to the collaboration with guitarist Steve Rothery, who plays a solo on the track "Do You Know What You Are Saying". Other guest appearances on the album came in the form of fans who had been encouraged to send in sound samples, which the band would use. Among the unusual instruments featured on the record are maracas, a comb, and a Leopard II battle tank.

Roy Funner had left the band after the 2004 tour to focus more on his family, and he was replaced by Kristian Torp. With the new lineup, Gazpacho supported Marillion once more on four gigs during the Not Quite Christmas Tour. After this tour, Kristian Skedsmo announced he no longer wanted to go on prolonged tours away from home, and the live lineup was reduced to a six-piece band.

=== Night (2006–2008) ===
After a year of silence, Night was released in February 2007. For this occasion, Gazpacho was once more invited to appear at Marillion's Convention Weekend, this time in the Netherlands. They also played their first international headlining gig, at the Boerderij in Zoetermeer, Netherlands, on 1 February 2007.

Night showed a departure from the short song format of the band's previous albums, consisting instead of one long, 50-minute conceptual piece, divided into five parts. In the words of the band, it was a

musical description of a dream or a stream of consciousness. It explores the question of where dreams end and reality begins and the mind as the tool that has to decide what to believe. The character goes through various memories real and imagined and sees the world from the angles of different people. He travels through time and visits places across the world including old New Orleans and Ancient woods with Pagan rituals being performed. Night is about life and the various ways of interpreting existence. Pretentious? Oh yes but delicious as well... very delicious.

Mikael Krømer, who had played violin on all previous albums and live shows, was welcomed as a full-time band member on Night, also earning a co-producer credit. Night also saw the return of Kristian "the Duke" Skedsmo, playing six instruments on the album. Skedsmo rejoined the band for a one-off live appearance in Oslo on 19 January 2008.

Night was well received in progressive rock circles, topping the Just for Kicks Music sales chart for two weeks after its release. The prog-related international press was almost unanimously positive, calling the album "very, very grand art" and "an incredible album". Night charted in the reader's top 20 at Progwereld for more than a year, and it did well in several readers' polls at the end of the year. It was voted ninth-best album of 2007 by listeners of the Polish internet radio station MLWZ.

During one of the live performances of Night on 18 July 2008, the audience at the Boerderij in Zoetermeer got a first taste of a new song in progress called "Tick Tock", which was played for the first time in its entirety, clocking in at 22 minutes and 24 seconds. This song later turned out to be the title track of Gazpacho's new album.

=== Tick Tock (2009–2010) ===
On 15 March 2009, Gazpacho's fifth studio album, Tick Tock, was released on HTW Records, a division of Sony BMG. The album is based on the story of French writer and navigator Antoine de Saint-Exupéry, who took off in an attempt at a long-distance flight from Paris to Saigon in 1935. He crashed in the Sahara Desert many hours later, becoming stranded with his co-pilot Prevot. Later, he recounted his experience in a book called Wind, Sand and Stars, and this story forms the basis of the album Tick Tock.

In connection with Tick Tock, Gazpacho conducted their first official headlining tour, the Tick Tock Tour, visiting six countries between 26 March and 8 April 2009. In the meantime, the album and corresponding shows received rave reviews.

In July 2009, Gazpacho headed off to Germany to perform as headliners at the Night of the Prog festival at the Loreley Open-Air Theatre in Sankt Goarshausen. The concert was recorded and released on DVD in January 2010 as A Night at Loreley.

At the end of 2009, during the process of editing, mixing, and producing the DVD, the band announced that drummer Robert R. Johansen had decided to leave the band due to personal circumstances.

In the early days of 2010, a replacement for Johansen was found in Lars Erik Asp, just in time for the second part of the Tick Tock Tour. The original plan was to visit six countries in March/April, but due to a plane crash in Poland, with the corresponding one week of mourning, the Polish promoter decided to cancel the concerts in Poland from 16 to 18 April. The dates were postponed until September 2010. On 1 May 2010, the band's first concert in the United States was announced as part of a progressive rock festival. Gazpacho played at the Majestic Theater in Gettysburg, Pennsylvania. For the European gigs in September, they hired Micheal Krumins (Green Carnation, Sirenia) as a stand-in guitarist as Vilbo had to take time off due to family commitments.

=== Missa Atropos (2011) ===
In 2010, during the Tick Tock Tour, Gazpacho sold copies of their new album, Missa Atropos. Even before its official release on 26 November, it had achieved number one on Progwereld, a Dutch prog site.

Missa Atropos was a concept album taking the idea of Atropos, a Greek Goddess, and updating it to the modern era, where a man isolates himself from the world in a lighthouse to write a mass for Atropos, experiencing solitude as he does so. The story tells of what happens inside his head, his three attempts to write a mass, and his ultimate success at its creation.

The album was accompanied by a twelve-gig tour in five countries in January and February 2011. One of those countries was the UK, where the London gig at Dingwalls on 30 January was recorded and released on 24 October as the double live CD London.

=== March of Ghosts (2012–2013) ===
The end of 2011 brought the news that March of Ghosts would be the name of the band's seventh studio album and the follow-up to Missa Atropos. While Missa Atropos was a long story about one person leaving everything behind, March of Ghosts was a collection of short stories. The idea behind the album was to have the lead character spend a night where a number of ghosts (dead and alive) would march past him to tell their stories. Characters include Haitian war criminals, the crew of the Mary Celeste, a returning American World War I soldier who finds himself in 2012, and the ghost of an English comedy writer (P. G. Wodehouse) who was wrongly accused of treason. The album was released on 12 March 2012 and accompanied by a tour in March and April 2012.

=== Demon (2014) ===
In late 2013, Gazpacho announced via their Facebook page that they had finished recording their eighth studio album, Demon, due to be released in 2014. Demon was released in March 2014 and the band toured the UK and Europe in support of it in April.

=== Night of the Demon and Molok (2015) ===
Gazpacho released a live CD/DVD album titled Night of the Demon in April 2015.

In October/November 2015, they toured in support of the album Molok (Kscope; 23 October 2015). They played two venues in Poland, two in Germany, and two in the Netherlands, including The Boerderij, Zoetermeer. They completed the tour with a gig at the O2 Academy Islington, London.

The band were joined on the tour by chamber progressive band Iamthemorning.

=== Soyuz (2018) ===
Gazpacho announced in October 2017 that drummer Lars Erik Asp had left the band to focus on other commitments. They publicized that they would be releasing their tenth studio album, Soyuz, in 2018, and would embark on a European tour in support of the album, before appearing at the Be Prog! My Friend festival in Barcelona in June. Former drummer Robert Johansen was named as Asp's replacement for the Soyuz album, which, according to keyboardist Thomas Andersen, "is about being frozen in time". Soyuz came out on 18 May 2018, with opening track "Soyuz One" released as the first single on 23 February 2018.

=== Fireworker (2020) ===
In April 2020, Gazpacho announced the title of their upcoming eleventh studio album, Fireworker, on their Facebook page. Fireworker was released on 18 September 2020.

The band planned to tour in October 2020 with Pure Reason Revolution. However, this was cancelled. As the live show was already rehearsed, Gazpacho live-streamed a performance from their rehearsal space in Fredrikstad on 25 October 2020. A recording was released as Fireworking at St. Croix in March 2022.

=== Magic 8-Ball (2025) ===
Gazpacho released their 12th studio album, Magic 8-Ball, in October 2025.

== Band members ==
Current members

- Jan-Henrik Ohme (aka "O") – vocals (1996–present)
- Jon-Arne Vilbo – guitars, programming (1996–present)
- Thomas Andersen – keyboards, programming (1996–present)
- Mikael Krømer – violin, additional guitar, programming (2001–present)
- Kristian Torp (aka "Fido") – bass (2005–present)
- Robert R Johansen – drums, percussion (2004–2009, 2017–present)

Guest members

- Kristian Skedsmo (aka "the Duke") – flutes, whistles, accordion, didgeridoo, guitar, banjo, mandolin (2002–2005, 2007)
- Michael Krumins (aka "Captain Flash") – guitars, (2010)

Past members

- Lars Erik Asp – drums, percussion (2010–2017)
- Roy Funner – bass (2000–2004)
- Geir Digernes – drums (2003)

Collaborators

- Peter Kearns – producer, strings, vocals (2003)
- Esther Valentine – vocals (2003)
- Steve Lyon – producer (2004)
- Steve Rothery – guitar (2005)

== Discography ==
Studio albums

- Bravo (2003)
- When Earth Lets Go (2004)
- Firebird (2005)
- Night (2007)
- Tick Tock (2009)
- Missa Atropos (2010)
- March of Ghosts (2012)
- Demon (2014)
- Molok (2015)
- Soyuz (2018)
- Fireworker (2020)
- Magic 8-Ball (2025)

EPs

- Get It While It's Cold (37°C) (2002)

Live

- A Night at Loreley (2010)
- London (2011)
- Night of the Demon (2015)
- Fireworking at St. Croix (2022)

Compilations

- Introducing Gazpacho (2015)

Appearances

- Makeastar.com Compilation Vol. 2 (2002) (Sea of Tranquility)
- Marillion – Wish You Were Here DVD (2005) (Sea of Tranquility, Ghost and Afraid of Sunlight)
