= Hammer and Anvil (album) =

Studio album by Pure Reason Revolution
- Released: 15 October 2010
- Recorded: 2009–2010
- Genre: New prog, electronic rock, electronica
- Length: 51:09
- Label: Superball Music
- Producer: Tom Bellamy, Jon Courtney

Pure Reason Revolution chronology
Amor Vincit Omnia (2009)	Hammer and Anvil (2010)	Eupnea (2020)

Professional ratings
Review scores
Source	Rating
Metal Hammer	7/7
Sea of Tranquility	4/5 stars
Sputnikmusic	2.5/5 stars
TeamRock	3/5 stars
The 405	8/10

Hammer and Anvil is the third full-length album by British progressive rock band Pure Reason Revolution, released by Superball Music on 15 October 2010 in Germany, Austria and Switzerland, 18 October in the rest of Europe, and October 25 in the United States. According to Rock Sound, in Hammer and Anvil, "the band have retained most of their heavy hooks to create a great crossover record. A track like 'Last Man Last Round' will fit into many Pendulum fans' heads, whereas their progressive elements are still prevalent in 'Open Insurrection'". The album was new for the band in that all songs were co-written and co-produced by Tom Bellamy, an ex-member of the band The Cooper Temple Clause. Bellamy has full writing credit for the first track, 'Fight Fire'. Jon Courtney shares credit on all other tracks.

== Track listing ==
1. "Fight Fire" - 4:29
2. "Black Mourning" - 5:00
3. "Patriarch" - 4:18
4. "Last Man, Last Round" - 4:45
5. "Valour" - 4:46
6. "Over the Top" - 4:41
7. "Never Divide" - 4:48
8. "Blitzkrieg" - 5:34
9. "Open Insurrection" - 7:20
10. "Armistice" - 6:16
