= Seija =

Seija is a given name. Notable people with the given name include:

- Seija Ballhaus (born 2000), German judoka
- Seija Karkinen (born 1936), Finnish jurist and politician
- Seija Pöntinen (1934–1998), Finnish hurdler
- Seija Simola (1944–2017), Finnish singer
- Seija Toro (fl. 1989), Finnish diplomat

== See also ==
- Seijas, surname
