= Period Pains =

British indie punk band

- Origin: Reading, Berkshire, England
- Genres: Indie rock, punk, riot grrrl
- Years active: 1996–1997
- Label: Damaged Goods
- Past members: Chloe Alper; Felicity Aldridge; Laura Warwick; Magda Przybylski; Laura Viney

Period Pains were a British all-female indie punk band formed in 1996. They gained attention in 1997 after releasing the single "Spice Girls (Who Do You Think You Are?)". They then recorded a session for John Peel, which was subsequently released as an EP.

They opened the Reading Festival in 1997 on the Dr. Marten's Stage.

Chloe Alper went on to co-found Pure Reason Revolution. Felicity Aldridge moved into film production working for director/producer Nick Weschler.

== Spice Girls (Who Do You Think You Are?) ==
"Spice Girls (Who Do You Think You Are?)"

Single by Period Pains
- Released: 18 July 1997
- Recorded: 1997
- Genre: Pop punk, riot grrrl
- Length: 1:44
- Label: Damaged Goods
- Songwriters: Chloe Alper, Felicity Aldridge

Period Pains singles chronology
"Spice Girls (Who Do You Think You Are?)" (1997)	"BBC Sessions" (1997)

The band achieved notoriety in 1997 after releasing the single "Spice Girls (Who Do You Think You Are?)", a play on the Spice Girls' single title. The track was an attack on what they saw as the Spice Girls' shallow attitudes, and was heavily plugged by John Peel and Steve Lamacq on BBC Radio 1. The UK's tabloid newspapers also picked up on the band. As a result, it made the UK Singles Chart at number 87 in late August 1997 with practically no advertising, and was number 4 in Peel's annual end-of-year Festive Fifty.

=== Charts ===
Chart (1997)	Peak position
UK Singles (Official Charts)	87

== Discography ==
=== Singles and EPs ===
- "Spice Girls (Who Do You Think You Are?" (Damaged Goods, 1997) [#87, UK Singles Chart], condensed chart (3-track single)
- BBC Sessions (Damaged Goods, 1997) (5-track Peel Session EP)

=== Compilation Appearances ===
- "Daddy, I Want a Pony" on And The Rest Is History (Zerox, 1997) (LP/CD compilation inc. Kenickie, Helen Love, Symposium, Midget, Bellatrix, Disco Pistol, etc.)
