= Gaudry =

Gaudry is a surname. Notable people with the surname include:

- Bryce Gaudry (1942–2019), Australian politician
- Jean Albert Gaudry
- Neil Gaudry, Canadian politician
- Roger Gaudry, chemist and businessman
- Tracey Gaudry, Australian sport administrator

== See also ==
- Waldric
