= Gabriel Seijas =

Argentine professional footballer

Personal information
- Full name: Gabriel Nicolás Seijas
- Date of birth: 24 March 1994 (age 32)
- Place of birth: Ranelagh, Argentina
- Height: 1.75 m (5 ft 9 in)
- Position: Midfielder

Team information
- Current team: Talleres Remedios

Youth career
- Estudiantes

Senior career*
Years	Team	Apps	(Gls)
2014–2016	Estudiantes	6	(0)
2016–2019	Atlanta	63	(1)
2019–	Talleres Remedios	6	(0)
- * Club domestic league appearances and goals as of 21:57, 17 September 2019 (UTC)

Gabriel Nicolás Seijas (born 24 March 1994) is an Argentine professional footballer who plays as a midfielder for Talleres Remedios.

== Career ==
Estudiantes were the first senior team of Seijas' career. He made his professional bow in the Primera División in September 2014, appearing for seventy-two minutes of a one-goal defeat away to Atlético de Rafaela under manager Mauricio Pellegrino. Five appearances followed across the 2015 campaign, though he didn't feature in the subsequent 2016. On 3 July 2016, Primera B Metropolitana side Atlanta signed Seijas. He netted his first goal in the penultimate month of his opening season, scoring the third of the club's four goals at the Estadio Fragata Presidente Sarmiento versus Almirante Brown in May 2017; they came third in 2016–17.

== Career statistics ==
As of 29 April 2019.

Appearances and goals by club, season and competition
Club	Season	League			Cup		League Cup		Continental		Other		Total	
Club	Season	Division	Apps	Goals	Apps	Goals	Apps	Goals	Apps	Goals	Apps	Goals	Apps	Goals
Estudiantes	2014	Primera División	1	0	0	0	—		0	0	0	0	1	0
Estudiantes	2015	Primera División	5	0	0	0	—		0	0	0	0	5	0
Estudiantes	2016	Primera División	0	0	0	0	—		—		0	0	0	0
Estudiantes	Total		6	0	0	0	—		0	0	0	0	6	0
Atlanta	2016–17	Primera B Metropolitana	32	1	1	0	—		—		1 (Note: Appearance(s) in the Primera B Metropolitana play-offs)	0	34	1
Atlanta	2017–18	Primera B Metropolitana	4	0	0	0	—		—		1	0	5	0
Atlanta	2018–19	Primera B Metropolitana	27	0	0	0	—		—		0	0	27	0
Atlanta	Total		63	1	1	0	—		—		2	0	66	1
Career total			69	1	1	0	—		0	0	2	0	72	1
