= Pure Reason Revolution =

British rock group

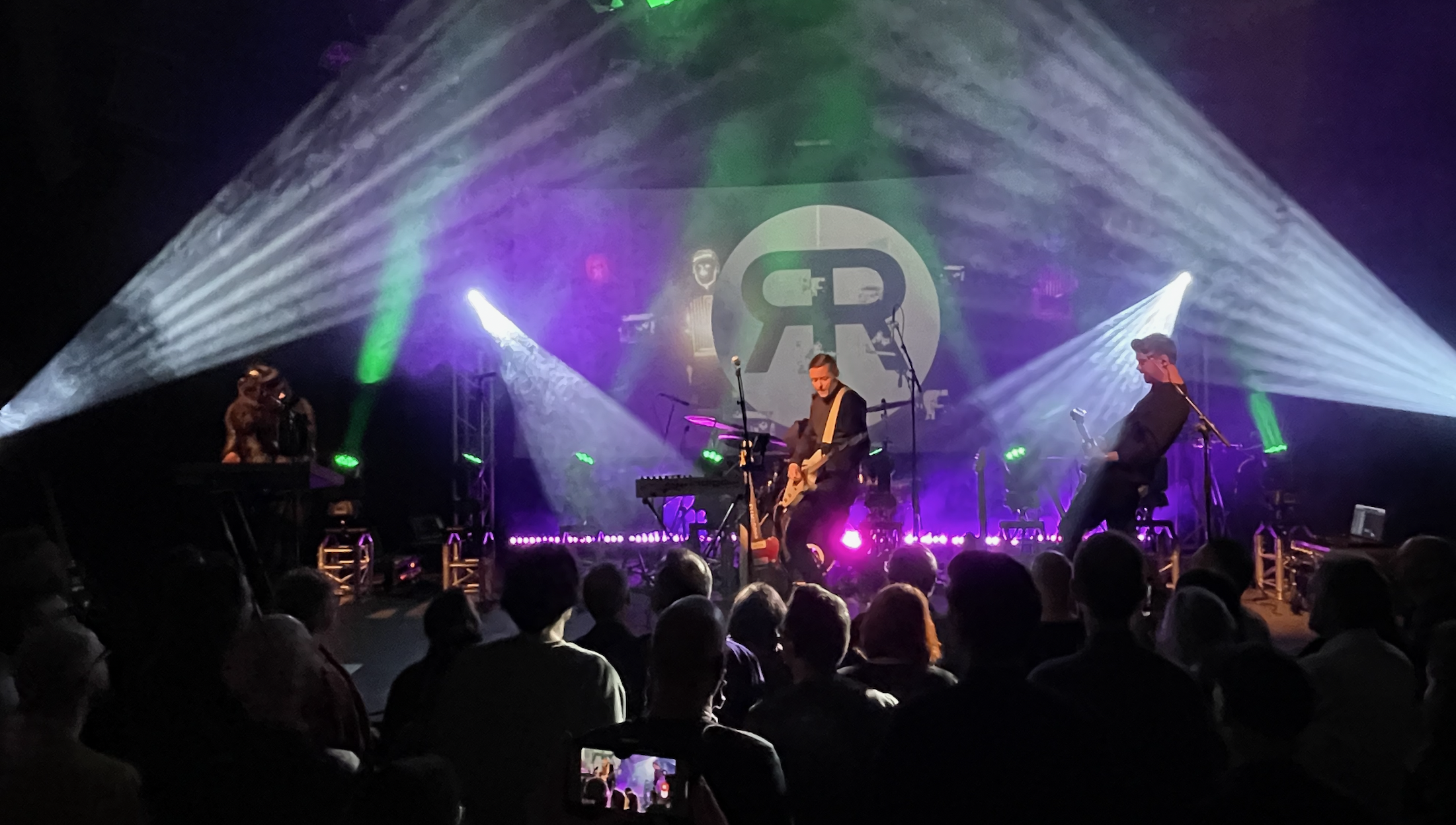

Background information
- Origin: England, UK
- Genres: Alternative rock, progressive rock, electronic
- Years active: 2003–2011; 2019–present
- Labels: InsideOut Music, Superball Music, Poptones, Sony BMG
- Members: Jon Courtney; Greg Jong; Annicke Shireen; Ravi Kesavaram
- Past members: Jamie Willcox; Paul Glover; Jim Dobson; Andrew Courtney; Chloë Alper

Pure Reason Revolution is a British rock group formed at the University of Westminster in 2003. Their music incorporates elements of progressive rock and electronic. Members have a shared appreciation for the work of bands such as Pink Floyd, Porcupine Tree, Nirvana, Justice, Kraftwerk and Fleetwood Mac.

== History ==
=== The Sunset Sound ===
Pure Reason Revolution began as a band named The Sunset Sound in Reading, Berkshire, which featured the Courtney brothers, Chloë Alper and, for a short while, Jim Dobson. The Courtney brothers had previously played with pop punk guitar band Gel, which was scouted and signed by Seymour Stein, the founder of Sire. Alper used to front Period Pains, who scored a hit with an anti-Spice Girls song in 1997.

The band was completed by Tom Leathes (vocals, guitar) and Bob Cooper (bass guitar). Debut single "Moving" picked up radio airplay on BBC Radio 1 (where the band was championed by alternative-music guru Steve Lamacq), XFM and LA's KROQ.

=== Formation ===
Courtney J, Dobson and Greg Jong met at the University of Westminster 2000–2003 and went through a number of name changes before settling on Pure Reason Revolution (PRR), including The Wow and Pendulum Dawn.

The band signed to Alan McGee's Poptones label for a one-off release of "Apprentice of the Universe" (peaking at No. 74 in a national chart).

Signing to Sony BMG in autumn 2004, the following year saw the band releasing two singles – the 12-minute-long Bright Ambassadors of Morning (the title is from a line in Pink Floyd's Echoes on the Meddle album), and The Intention Craft – plus one mini-album, Cautionary Tales for the Brave. This was released to make up for delays in recording that meant the band would miss its original launch window. The use of so many of the proposed album tracks on a mini-album led the band to develop some new material for the album, including "The Twyncyn/Trembling Willows". Releases were on the band's own Holograph imprint, via Sony BMG.

In March 2005, the band played the South by Southwest festival in Austin, Texas, before playing several North American dates, and they regularly played on the British club circuit. During this time, PRR supported Mew, Hope of the States, Secret Machines, and Oceansize, as well as headlining their own gigs and recorded sessions for Mark Radcliffe's Radio Two show and XFM. In spring 2005, Jong left the band, to be replaced by another Westminster pal Jamie Willcox, though it is Jong's work featured on recorded output up to, and including, The Dark Third. Both Jong and Willcox receive credits on the album The Dark Third.

The band sometimes allowed fans to listen to streaming material via its MySpace website, including works in progress and exclusive Christmas tracks.

The first album, The Dark Third was released in the UK on 10 April 2006, and was produced by Paul Northfield (Rush, Porcupine Tree, Gentle Giant, Dream Theater). A US version of the album containing the original, pre-Cautionary Tales mooted track listing and amended artwork was released in the U.S. on 25 July 2006.

In summer 2006, with his wife, Susanne Courtney, being pregnant with their first child, Andrew Courtney left the band. He was replaced by Paul Glover, formerly of the band Wire Jesus.

Jim Dobson then left the band in November 2006. Although there was no formal announcement regarding his departure, a notice on the band's forum explained that nothing more could be said, for "legal reasons".

With sales from The Dark Third being significantly less than expected, the band were dropped from Sony/BMG in December 2006.

On 16 February 2007, the European version was released under licence to InsideOut Music.

Pure Reason Revolution supported Blackfield on their European tour in February 2007. This was their first support tour with new drummer Paul Glover. Their live set had few changes, one of which was a reworked reprise of the album bonus track "Golden Clothes", in which all band members played synthesizers and end singing a cappella.

Following the tour, the band began recording the follow-up to The Dark Third. In June, the band journeyed to the US again to play at the 2007 edition of the renowned progressive/art rock festival NEARfest, as well as at three other clubs. These shows saw the debut of a new song called "Deus Ex Machina". Pure Reason Revolution also opened for Porcupine Tree on their 'Tour of a Blank Planet' European tour in June/July 2007.

The band also played a hastily arranged gig at Leicester (the Square) 9 April 2007, and just one more full UK date on 15 October at Southampton University.

The band released a 4-track EP of "Victorious Cupid" on ORG Records on 14 April 2008, accompanied by a one-off London show on 12 April 2008. The band played another one-off show at the Camden Barfly on 31 July 2008 which was followed by a ten-date mini-tour of Europe. This included a set in Bonn, Germany, which was recorded for German TV network WDR and will be broadcast in February 2009. Shows are also scheduled for the Eclipsed Magazine festival at Colos-Saal, Germany on 22 November 2008 and at London's Cargo on 26 November 2008. A live album entitled Live at NEARfest 2007 was released on 20 June 2008.

In April 2008 the band signed to German label Superball Music for the release of their next album, about which manager Jonathan Cooke made the following statement: "It was refreshing to find a situation that combines the artist commitment and enthusiasm of an indie with the ambition of a major. Signing a longer-term deal with Superball Music for album 2 onwards was an easy decision to make". On 28 November 2008 they confirmed their second album would be titled Amor Vincit Omnia and would be released on 9 March 2009.

On 5 March 2009, the band began their most extensive tour to date, comprising about 12 concerts in the UK and approximately 22 in mainland Europe. The band were track of the week on Kerrang! Radio and track of the day in Classic Rock Magazine – which also featured a double-page spread on the band in their quarterly prog-rock issue. A single from the album, "Deus Ex Machina", was released as a download only on 24 March 2009. Promo-CDs with three versions of the single were distributed at gigs on the 2009 tour.

Recent material was considerably more electronic, a departure from their more dreamy, classic-prog style of The Dark Third. According to Organ magazine, "Pure Reason Revolution are such a strange band...they're a mating of angelic prog rock harmony in the style of Yes, and old school Man Parrish hip hop style stripped down Justice electro funk. This actually works." The change of style has been reflected in Amor Vincit Omnia's artwork, designed entirely by bassist/vocalist Chloe Alper, which is darker and less spacey, whilst remaining surreal and symbolic.

The band completed its third studio album, entitled Hammer and Anvil, released via Superball Music on 15 October 2010 in Germany, Austria and Switzerland, and 18 October in the rest of Europe. The new music continued the dark, electronic themes of Amor Vincit Omnia, and was partially inspired by themes of World War I and II. According to Rock Sound, "the band have retained most of their heavy hooks to create a great crossover record. A track like 'Last Man Last Round' will fit into many Pendulum fans' heads, whereas their progressive elements are still prevalent in 'Open Insurrection'". The album was co-written and co-produced by Courtney and Tom Bellamy.

The band played a series of live shows in London, Germany and the Netherlands during summer 2010, a short tour in Europe and the UK in November and December, and another mini-tour in Germany in February 2011. A one-off concert at London Scala marked the band's biggest headline gig to date, and included contributions from Tom Bellamy and the string section of Clean Bandit, as well as one of the first performances of "Bullitts Dominae" (a fan favourite which had previously not been played live).

On 9 August 2011, the band announced that they were splitting up, with final shows in the UK in November 2011. On 5 November 2011, the band released the EP, Valour.

=== Reunion ===
On 12 October 2018, Pure Reason Revolution were announced as co-headliners of the Midsummer Prog Festival to be held in June 2019 at the Openluchtheater, Valkenburg, Netherlands. Jon Courtney and Chloe Alper were the only members of the band to return. They released a new album, Eupnea, in April 2020 on InsideOut, which was stylistically closer to their first release. The band were also scheduled to appear at "Prog in the Park" as part of the Ramblin Man Fair in Maidstone, Kent, England on 18 July 2020.

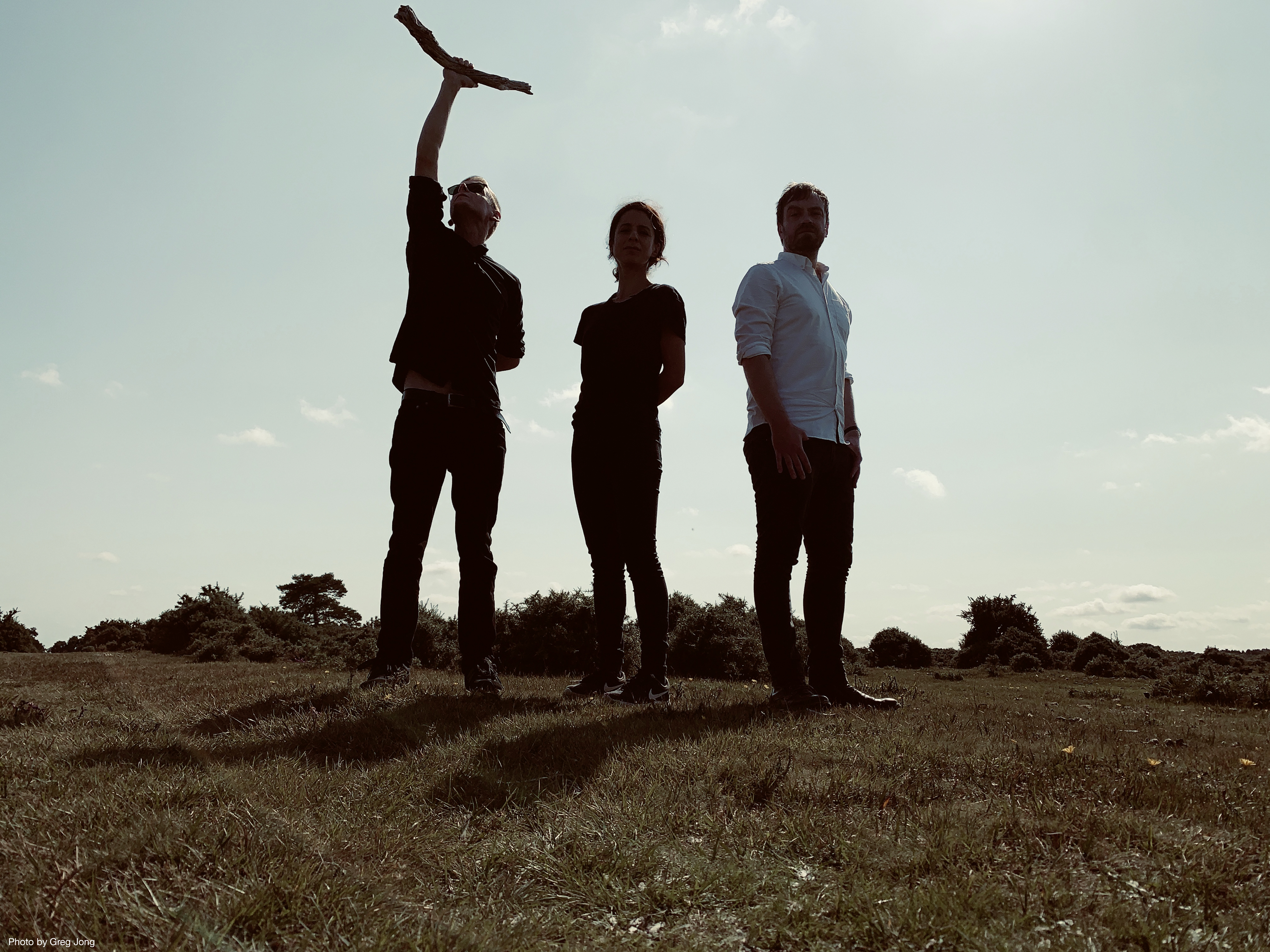
Pure Reason Revolution (Above Cirrus photo session)

The band released Above Cirrus on 6 May 2022 on InsideOutMusic. Courtney and Alper are joined by Greg Jong, who re-joined the band.

Coming Up to Consciousness was released in 2024, with Courtney and Jong, but without Alper. The album features new vocalist Annicke Shireen (touring member of Heilung) and drummer Ravi Kesavaram (member of My Vitriol).

=== Critical reaction ===
Rick Wakeman has given the band a favourable review.

== Members ==
=== Studio ===
Current

- Jon Courtney – vocals, guitars, keyboards
- Greg Jong – vocals, guitars (2003–2005, 2021–present)
- Annicke Shireen – vocals (2024–present)
- Ravi Kesavaram – drums (2024–present)

Past

- Chloë Alper – vocals, bass guitars, keyboard (2003–2023)
- Jamie Willcox – vocals, guitars (2005–2011)
- Paul Glover – drums (2006–2011)
- Jim Dobson – keyboards, bass guitar, violin, guitars, vocals (2003–2006)
- Andrew Courtney – drums (2003–2006)

Timeline

=== Live ===
The live band consists of the current touring members:

- Jon Courtney – vocals, guitars, keyboards
- Greg Jong – guitars, vocals
- Annicke Shireen – vocals, keyboards
- Ravi Kesavaram – drums
- Ingo Jetten – bass, guitars, vocals

== Discography ==
=== Studio albums ===
- The Dark Third (2006)
- Amor Vincit Omnia (2009)
- Hammer and Anvil (2010)
- Eupnea (2020)
- Above Cirrus (2022)
- Coming Up to Consciousness (2024)
- Terrifying Angels (2026)

=== Live albums ===
- Live at NEARfest 2007 (2008)

=== Extended plays ===
- Cautionary Tales for the Brave (2005)
- Valour EP (2011)

=== Singles ===
Nimos & Tambos
"Nimos & Tambos", from The Dark Third

Victorious Cupid
"Victorious Cupid" (single)

- "Apprentice of the Universe" (2004)
- "The Bright Ambassadors of Morning" (2005)
- "The Intention Craft" (2005)
- "Victorious Cupid" (2008)
- "Deus Ex Machina" (2009)
- "Valour" (2011)
- "Silent Genesis" (2020)
- "New Obsession" (2020)
- "Ghosts & Typhoons" (2020)
- "New Kind of Evil" (2022)
- "Phantoms" (2022)
- "Dead Butterfly" (2022)
- "Dig Till You Die" (2024)
- "Useless Animal" (2024)

=== Videos ===
- "Live at Scala – 09.12.10" (2011)
