= The Cooper Temple Clause =

Alternative rock band

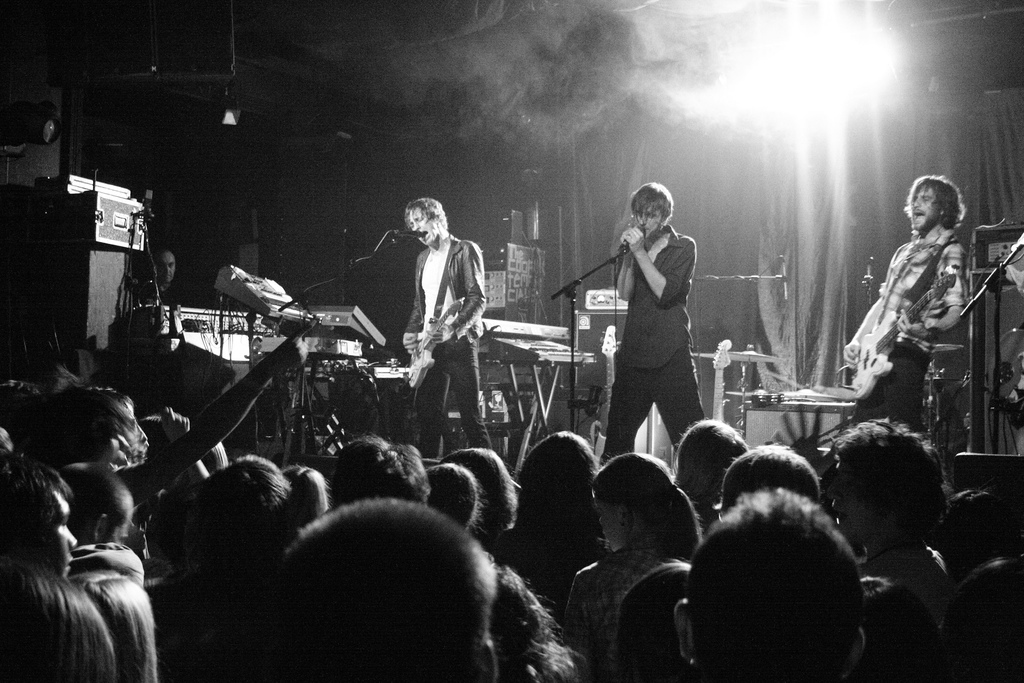

Background information
- Origin: Wokingham, Berkshire, England
- Genres: Alternative rock, post-hardcore, new prog, space rock, electronic rock
- Years active: 1998–2007
- Labels: Sequel, RCA, Morning
- Past members: Tom Bellamy; Daniel Fisher; Ben Gautrey; Jon Harper; Kieran Mahon; Didz Hammond

The Cooper Temple Clause were an English alternative rock band, formed in Wokingham, Berkshire in 1998. The band released three albums before announcing their split on 24 April 2007, following the departure of Daniel Fisher.

After signing a record deal with the RCA label in 2000 and putting out several singles and EPs, their debut album, See This Through and Leave, was released in 2002 to critical acclaim. 2003's follow-up, Kick Up the Fire, and Let the Flames Break Loose, achieved the band international recognition on the strength of the singles "Promises, Promises" and "Blind Pilots". The Cooper Temple Clause left RCA in 2006, signing to Sequel Records for the release of their third album, Make This Your Own.

The band were named after the Cowper-Temple clause, the first part of the name of which is pronounced as in the band's name. The clause was inserted into the Elementary Education Act 1870 (33 & 34 Vict. c. 75) (it became Section 14 of the Act), and was a compromise on the nature of religious education in the state elementary schools set up in England and Wales by the Act. It was named after its proposer, Liberal Member of Parliament (MP) William Cowper-Temple (born William Francis Cowper, later Baron Mount Temple).

During many of their early interviews, the band would make up various stories related to the origin of their name. An example of this can be seen in a video interview by Supersweet TV.

== History ==
=== See This Through and Leave (2002) ===
The band's debut album, See This Through and Leave, was released on 11 February 2002. Three singles were released from the album: "Let's Kill Music", the double-A side "Film-Maker // Been Training Dogs", and "Who Needs Enemies?". The album was released on CD, limited edition double CD, international CD and a 7" boxed set, along with 2 promo CDs. The limited edition double CD contained 3 extra songs and live versions of "Panzer Attack" and "Let's Kill Music". It was well received by critics and reached number 27 in the UK Albums Chart. Fisher wrote the lyrics for this first album.

=== Kick Up the Fire, and Let the Flames Break Loose (2003) ===
Nineteen months after See This Through And Leave, The Cooper Temple Clause released their second album, Kick Up the Fire, and Let the Flames Break Loose, on 8 September 2003. The album, which saw the band record for the first time at their own studios Bleak House, had a different style and increasingly incorporated electronic sounds into tracks. Its two singles, "Promises, Promises" and "Blind Pilots", achieved the band international recognition, with "Promises, Promises" reaching number 19 on the UK Singles Chart. The album was hailed by fans and critics alike and reached number 5 in the UK Albums Chart, the highest position the band would ever achieve.

=== Didz Hammond's departure and Make This Your Own (2005–2007) ===
In September 2005, bassist Didz Hammond left the band to join ex-Libertine Carl Barât in the band Dirty Pretty Things. The Cooper Temple Clause issued a statement on their official website confirming Didz's departure. However, Hammond is credited as playing bass on two of Make This Your Own's eleven tracks: "Damage" and "What Have You Gone And Done".

After many setbacks including a change in record label, and the loss of Didz Hammond, the band's third album was significantly delayed. It was finally released on 22 January 2007 and entitled Make This Your Own. It included the singles "Damage", "Homo Sapiens", "Waiting Game" and "Head". The album saw Fisher and Bellamy having a greater role in vocals, and featured fewer electronic influences than the previous album.

=== The split and post-split work (2007–present) ===
The band announced they had split up in late April 2007, following Fisher's decision to leave. The band had been due to headline the AKG Unsigned Heroes gig at London's KOKO in Camden later in the same week. During the week prior to the official split, the band had been scheduled to perform at Underworld and Dingwalls as part of the Camden Crawl. These two appearances were cancelled, however, with the band citing exhaustion as the reason. It is not clear whether the split was also a factor in the cancellations. A post was made on the band's website announcing the split.

Tom Bellamy is currently a member of Losers and the live drummer for White Belt Yellow Tag. Daniel Fisher is currently the lead singer, songwriter and guitarist in Red Kite; their debut album, Songs For Crow, was released in November 2013. Ben Gautrey is currently lead singer and guitarist in Type Two Error with Kieran Mahon playing bass and synths. In January 2023, the band announced on Instagram that they were working on their first album. Mahon completed an undergraduate degree at Queen Mary, University of London, and is currently completing an architectural history MA at University College London. Jon Harper became a session drummer in the Brazilian band Cansei de Ser Sexy (CSS) when Adriano Cintra took the place of Iracema Trevisan as bassist, after she left in March 2008. In November 2009 Harper joined the Chris Corner (ex–Sneaker Pimps) project IAMX as a member of the live band for a session that lasted until July 2010. Harper is also a tutor and lecturer at the Bristol Institute of Modern Music.

== Members ==
- Tom Bellamy – Guitar, bass, synthesizer, keyboard, trumpet, melodica, harmonica, percussion, vocals
- Daniel Fisher – Guitar, bass, vocals
- Ben Gautrey – Lead vocals, guitar, bass and keyboard
- Jon Harper – Drums, percussion and backing vocals
- Kieran Mahon – Keyboard, farfisa, guitar, bass and backing vocals
- Didz Hammond – Bass, synthesizer, vocoder, guitar and vocals

== Discography ==
=== Studio albums ===
| Title | Album details |
|---|---|
| See This Through and Leave | Release date: 11 February 2002; Label: Morning Records |
| Kick Up the Fire, and Let the Flames Break Loose | Release date: 24 February 2004 (US) 8 September 2003 (UK); Label: RCA Records, Morning Records |
| Make This Your Own | Release date: 22 January 2007; Label: Sequel Records |

=== Singles and EPs ===
| Date | Title (UK Singles Chart placing) |
|---|---|
| July 2000 | "Crayon Demos" |
| March 2001 | The Hardware EP |
| March 2001 | "Way Out West" |
| June 2001 | The Warfare EP |
| July 2001 | The Hardware EP + The Warfare EP |
| September 2001 | "Let's Kill Music" (#41) |
| January 2002 | "Film-Maker" / "Been Training Dogs" (#20) |
| May 2002 | "Who Needs Enemies?" (#22) |
| September 2002 | "A.I.M." |
| September 2003 | "Promises, Promises" (#19) |
| November 2003 | "Blind Pilots" (#37) |
| May 2006 | "Damage" |
| October 2006 | "Homo Sapiens" (#36) |
| January 2007 | "Waiting Game" (#41) |
| April 2007 | "Head" |
