= March of Ghosts =

Studio album by Gazpacho
- Released: March 12, 2012
- Recorded: 2011–2012
- Genre: Rock, progressive rock, art rock
- Length: 50:17
- Label: Kscope
- Producer: Gazpacho

Gazpacho chronology
Missa Atropos (2010)	March of Ghosts (2012)	Demon (2014)

March of Ghosts is the seventh studio album by Norwegian rock band Gazpacho. The album was released worldwide on March 12, 2012, by Kscope.

== History ==
The end of 2011 the band brought up the news that "March Of Ghosts" will be the band's 7th studio album and the follow-up to Missa Atropos. While as mentioned Missa Atropos was a long story about one person leaving everything behind, March of Ghosts is a collection of short stories. The idea behind the album was to have the lead character spend a night where all these ghosts (dead and alive) would march past him to tell their stories. Characters include Haitian war criminals, the crew of the Mary Celeste, a returning American World War I soldier who finds himself in 2012 and the ghost of an English comedy writer who was wrongly accused of treason. They are short stories. They are a march of ghosts. They are tales that need to be told.

Jon-Arne Vilbo stated: "March Of Ghosts was written in a day long jamming session in the studio where we took a weekend off from family and commitments. We're very happy with the result and it has given us inspiration thinking how far can we actually take this, and think if this actually was our profession!"

== Track listing ==
Track list confirmed by Kscope Music.

No.	Title	Length
1.	"Monument"	2:06
2.	"Hell Freezes Over I"	5:45
3.	"Hell Freezes Over II"	4:36
4.	"Black Lily"	4:58
5.	"Gold Star"	4:15
6.	"Hell Freezes Over III"	2:36
7.	"Mary Celeste"	5:43
8.	"What Did I Do?"	4:19
9.	"Golem"	5:10
10.	"The Dumb"	4:33
11.	"Hell Freezes Over IV"	6:11
Total length:		50:17
