= Make This Your Own =

Studio album by The Cooper Temple Clause
- Released: 22 January 2007
- Genres: Alternative rock, new prog, electronic rock
- Length: 46:42
- Label: Sequel Records
- Producers: Dan Austin, The Cooper Temple Clause

The Cooper Temple Clause chronology
Kick Up the Fire, and Let the Flames Break Loose (2003)	Make This Your Own (2007)

Professional ratings
Review scores
Source	Rating
Sputnikmusic	link
Drowned in Sound	(7/10) link
Uncut	3/5 stars
Rocklouder	link

Make This Your Own is the third and final album by British alternative rock band The Cooper Temple Clause.

It reached #33 in the UK album charts, despite not having the major label backing afforded to the band's first two albums.

== Release ==
"Homo Sapiens" is the first single release from Make This Your Own released on 22 January 2007. A promotional blank CD-R and sleeve with artwork were given out to fans at gigs on the band's 2006 UK tour. It reached number thirty-six on the UK Singles Chart. The music video for this single was sent to MTV2.

"Waiting Game" is the second single from Make This Your Own, released 8 January 2007. It reached #41 in the UK singles chart. The CD version of "Waiting Game" included a U-MYX feature which allowed people to remix the track in their own personal way. When the single charted it was the second week in UK chart history, in which all downloads count towards the chart regardless if there is a physical release or not. If the chart was still under the previous rules in which one was needed, the single would have made #36.

== Track listing ==
1. "Damage" - 3:43
2. "Homo Sapiens" - 3:26
3. "Head" - 3:52
4. "Connect" - 4:09
5. "Waiting Game" - 3:33
6. "Once More with Feeling" - 3:16
7. "What Have You Gone and Done?" - 3:56
8. "Take Comfort" - 4:21
9. "All I See Is You" - 6:43
10. "Isn't It Strange" - 4:34
11. "House of Cards" - 5:03
