= Missa Atropos =

Studio album by Gazpacho
- Released: 26 November 2010
- Recorded: 2009–2010
- Genre: Progressive rock, alternative rock
- Length: 59:07
- Label: HWT Records/Kscope
- Producer: Gazpacho

Gazpacho chronology
A Night at Loreley (2010)	Missa Atropos (2010)	March of Ghosts (2012)

Singles from Missa Atropos
- 1. "Defense Mechanism (Radio)" Released: 28 September 2010

Missa Atropos is the sixth studio album by Norwegian rock band Gazpacho. It was released in Norway on 15 September 2010 by HWT Records and worldwide on 22 March 2011 by Kscope.

== Background ==
In the early days of 2010, a replacement for recently departed drummer Robert R Johansen was found in Lars Erik Asp, just in time for him to get to know the band's music before the second part of their Tick Tock tour. This was planned to cover six countries in the March/April period, but due to a plane tragedy in Poland giving rise to a week of mourning, the Polish promoter decided to postpone the concerts planned for Poland on 16–18 April. The dates were rescheduled for September 2010. On 1 May 2010, the first concert in the US took place as part of a prog festival at the Majestic Theater in Gettysburg, Pennsylvania. For the later German/Italian festivals and the Polish gigs in September, Gazpacho hired a stand-in guitarist by the name of Micheal Krumins to cover for Jon-Arne following the arrival of his first child and his decision to give priority to his family. Meanwhile, in July 2010, the band announced that they would still go on without Johansen, that recording of the new album was almost complete, and that it would be out by the end of the year.

During the Tick Tock Tour's September gigs, pre-printed copies of the new record, titled Missa Atropos became available.

In December 2010, Gazpacho announced that they had licensed Missa Atropos to Kscope in the UK, which would give the label rights to the album worldwide. The release was accompanied by a twelve-gig tour in five different countries in January/February 2011.

== Story ==
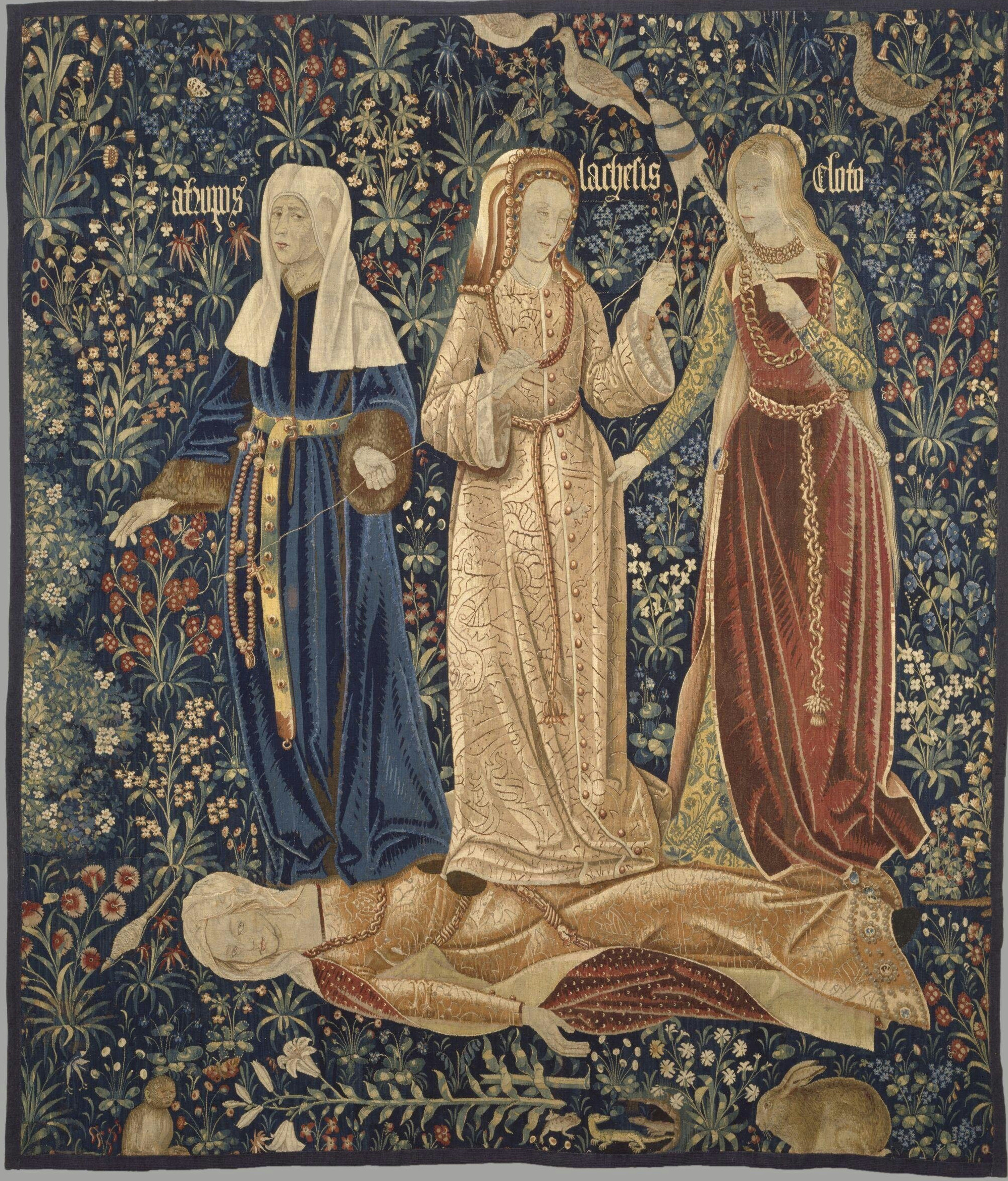
Atropos and her sisters

The album's title is a reference to Atropos, goddess of destiny in Greek mythology, eldest of the Three Fates. Their role was to ensure that every being, mortal and divine, lived out their destiny as it was assigned to them by the laws of the universe. For mortals, this destiny spanned their entire lives and was represented as a thread spun from a spindle. It was Atropos who chose the manner of death and ended each life by cutting the threads. She worked along with her two sisters, Clotho, who spun the thread, and Lachesis, who measured its length.

The album's story tells of a man who seeks refuge from the world, a "Defense Mechanism", by removing himself to an abandoned lighthouse, there to write a final mass for Atropos, with whom he is in love. He makes three attempts at this as he tries to fight against his destiny, which Atropos and her sisters have decided for him. As he discovers his powerlessness, he begins to write his "Will to Live". In the end, as he is dying, he utters his last words in "An Audience", to a "Snail", instructing him to describe Atropos' beauty to anyone he encounters.

== Critical reception ==
Professional ratings
Review scores
Source	Rating
Prog Archives	4/5 stars
Classic Rock Prog	Very Positive
Dangerdog Music Reviews	3.5/5 stars

The album received mostly positive reviews. The website Prog Archives awarded it four out of five stars, calling it an "Excellent addition to any prog rock music collection." Craig Hartranft of Dangerdog Music Reviews gave it three out of five stars, writing, "This work is both hard and hearty to digest. It's progressive, art, and alternative at its best with a dark sense", describing it as "dark, despondent, but artfully creative progressive rock." Jerry Ewing of Classic Rock Prog rated the album highly, writing: "A delightfully mellifluous selection. They won't be Norway's best kept secret much longer".

== Track listing ==
All lyrics are written by Jan Henrik Ohme; all music is composed by Gazpacho

No.	Title	Length
1.	"Mass for Atropos, Part 1"	1:43
2.	"Defense Mechanism"	6:29
3.	"I Was Never Here"	3:12
4.	"Snail"	3:39
5.	"River"	6:07
6.	"Mass for Atropos, Part 2: You're Going to Die Up There"	2:06
7.	"Missa Atropos"	8:25
8.	"She's Awake"	3:42
9.	"Vera"	7:26
10.	"Will to Live"	3:07
11.	"Mass for Atropos, Part 3"	1:40
12.	"Splendid Isolation"	8:33
13.	"An Audience"	2:52
Total length:		59:07

== Personnel ==
Credits confirmed on Allmusic:

Musicians

- Jan Henrik Ohme – vocals
- Thomas Andersen – keyboards
- Mikael Krømer – violin, mandolin
- Kristian Olav Torp – bass
- Jon-Arne Vilbo – guitar
- Lars Erik Asp – drums

Technical

- Mats 'Limpan' Lindfors – mastering

== Release history ==
Region	Date	Format	Edition(s)	Label
Fan Club Members only	15 September 2010	Digital Download	Standard	WiV Entertainment
Norway	26 November 2010	Compact Disc	Standard	HWT Sony Records, WiV Entertainment
Germany	26 November 2010	Compact Disc	Standard	HWT Sony Records, WiV Entertainment
United Kingdom	14 February 2011	Compact Disc	Standard + Digital Booklet	Kscope
Netherlands	22 March 2011	Compact Disc	Standard + Digital Booklet	Kscope
Portugal	22 March 2011	Compact Disc	Standard + Digital Booklet	Kscope
United States	22 March 2011	Compact Disc	Standard + Digital Booklet	Kscope
Austria	22 March 2011	Compact Disc	Standard + Digital Booklet	Kscope
