= Kick Up the Fire, and Let the Flames Break Loose =

Studio album by The Cooper Temple Clause
- Released: 8 September 2003
- Recorded: 2002–2003
- Studios: The Bleak House, Brighton
- Genres: Alternative rock, space rock, new prog, electronic rock
- Length: 53:40
- Labels: Morning Records, RCA Records
- Producers: Dan Austin, The Cooper Temple Clause

The Cooper Temple Clause chronology
See This Through and Leave (2002)	Kick Up the Fire, and Let the Flames Break Loose (2003)	Make This Your Own (2007)

Singles from Kick Up the Fire, and Let the Flames Break Loose
- 1. "Promises, Promises" Released: 1 September 2003; 2. "Blind Pilots" Released: 10 November 2003

Professional ratings
Aggregate scores
Source	Rating
Metacritic	70/100
Review scores
Source	Rating
AllMusic	4/5 stars
Blender	2/5 stars
Drowned in Sound	8/10
The Guardian	4/5 stars
NME	8/10
Playlouder	4/5 stars
Rolling Stone	2/5 stars

Kick Up the Fire, and Let the Flames Break Loose is the second album from the British alternative rock band, The Cooper Temple Clause, released on 8 September 2003 in the UK by Morning Records, and on 24 February 2004 in the U.S. by RCA.

The album title is taken from the first line of an untitled poem in Philip Larkin's collection The North Ship.

== Release and commercial performance ==
The album charted at No. 5 in the UK charts and dropped to No. 41 the following week. It was however considered a big success for the band.

It was released on CD and vinyl, including a limited edition with bonus DVD, a Japanese edition and an album sampler. Some CD releases of the album feature Copy Control protection.

"Promises, Promises" is the first single from Kick Up the Fire, and Let the Flames Break Loose. It reached number nineteen on the UK Singles Chart and has been featured on the 2004 video games, WRC 4 and FIFA Football 2004.

== Track listing ==
=== CD ===
1. "The Same Mistakes" – 4:52
2. "Promises, Promises" – 3:26
3. "New Toys" – 5:26
4. "Talking to a Brick Wall" – 5:59
5. "Into My Arms" – 6:12
6. "Blind Pilots" 4:01
7. "A.I.M." – 4:58
8. "Music Box" – 6:28
9. "In Your Prime" – 2:14
10. "Written Apology" – 10:10

The Japanese version includes "I Know" as a bonus song.

=== Bonus DVD ===
Bonus DVD video tracks (1–6), audio tracks (7–10):

1. "Promises, Promises"
2. "Making Promises, Promises"
3. "Let's Kill Music"
4. "Film-Maker"
5. "Been Training Dogs"
6. "Who Needs Enemies?"
7. "Promises, Promises" (live)
8. "Blind Pilots" (live)
9. "The Same Mistakes" (live)
10. "A.I.M." (live)

=== Album Sampler ===
1. "The Same Mistakes"
2. "Promises, Promises"
3. "Blind Pilots"
4. "New Toys"
5. "Music Box"
