= See This Through and Leave =

Studio album by The Cooper Temple Clause
- Released: 11 February 2002
- Recorded: 2001, Bath Moles, Great Linford Manor Studios
- Genres: Alternative rock, post-hardcore, space rock, electronic rock
- Length: 55:08
- Label: Morning Records
- Producer: Paul Corkett

The Cooper Temple Clause chronology
See This Through and Leave (2002)	Kick Up the Fire, and Let the Flames Break Loose (2003)

Professional ratings
Review scores
Source	Rating
AllMusic	link
NME	(7/10) link

See This Through and Leave is the debut album by the Cooper Temple Clause. The title of the album comes from a lyric in the track "Murder Song".

The liner notes give 'thanks' to Five and Westlife "for their ongoing financial support". This is a humorous reference to the fact that the Cooper Temple Clause shared a record label with the two popular boy bands, who could be seen to have helped finance this album.

== Release and commercial performance ==
It was released as a CD, a limited edition double CD, an international CD, and a 7" boxed set, along with two promo CDs.

The album reached No. 27 on the UK Albums Chart.

"Let's Kill Music" is the first single from this album and the first to have a promo video. It entered at #41 in the UK Singles Chart

"Film-Maker // Been Training Dogs" is a 2002 double A-side from this album. It peaked at number twenty on the UK Singles Chart. Each CD for this single was enhanced with the promo videos, on-set interviews with the band, photographs from the shoot, roll calls, and tokens. The A-side of the 7" was double-tracked, meaning that it contained two separate groove paths, one for each of the lead tracks, which means that it is essentially down to chance whether you hear "Film-Maker" or "Been Training Dogs".

"Who Needs Enemies?" is the third and final single from See This Through and Leave. It peaked at number twenty-two on the UK Singles Chart.

== Track listing ==
=== CD one ===
1. "Did You Miss Me?" - 4:40
2. "Film-Maker" - 2:57
3. "Panzer Attack" - 4:01
4. "Who Needs Enemies?" - 4:52
5. "Amber" - 5:07
6. "Digital Observations" - 7:14
7. "Let's Kill Music" - 4:13
8. "555-4823" - 4:54
9. "Been Training Dogs" - 3:13
10. "The Lake" - 5:23
11. "Murder Song" - 8:47

The international CD contains an extra track, "Safe Enough Distance Away".

=== Bonus disc ===
1. "Devil Walks in the Sand"
2. "Way Out West"
3. "I'll Still Write"
4. "Panzer Attack" (live)
5. "Let's Kill Music" (live)
