= Jon Courtney =

British musician

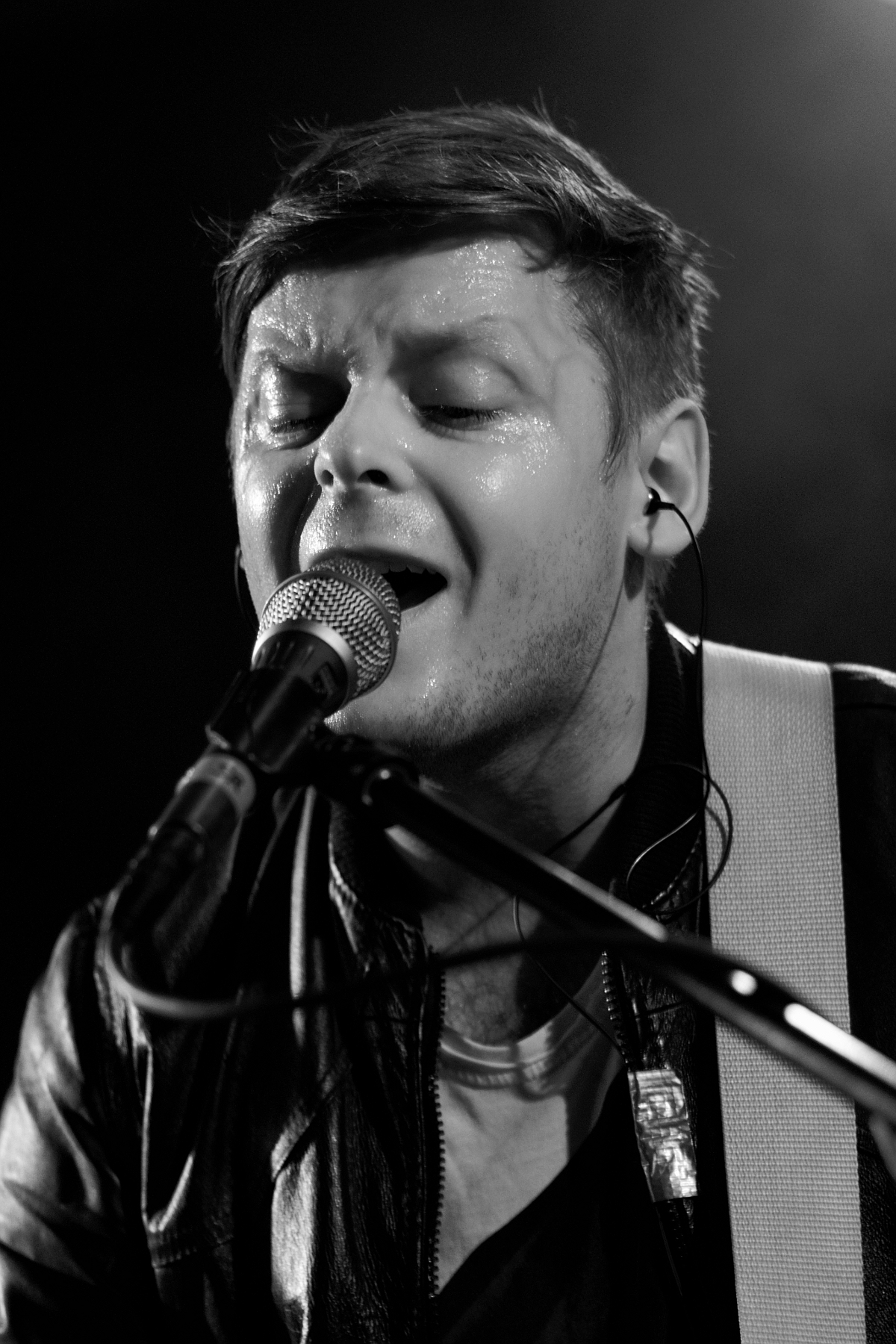
- Courtney in 2010

Background information
- Also known as: Cedo Simplex, KC Blitz
- Born: Jonathan Courtney; Sheffield, England
- Origin: Reading, Berkshire, England
- Genres: Progressive rock, alternative rock, new prog
- Instruments: Vocals, guitar, keyboard
- Years active: 2000–present
- Label: Superball Music

Jon Courtney is a British musician best known as a singer, guitarist, keyboard player and songwriter for the progressive rock band Pure Reason Revolution. He also performed with Bullet Height, KC Blitz and as a DJ under the pseudonym Cedo Simplex.

== Life and career ==
Courtney and his brother and former bandmate Andrew Courtney grew up in Reading, Berkshire, as did fellow Pure Reason Revolution members Chloe Alper and Jamie Willcox. In an interview, Courtney said he wanted to be a musician after seeing Nirvana on the MTV Awards in about 1991. Courtney said, "[F]rom that point on it was like "wow!" – I was transfixed by the TV – "this is what I've got to do, there's no question."

Courtney began playing in bands at Reading Blue Coat School. He and his brother were involved in the punk band Gel, which was scouted and signed by Seymour Stein, the founder of Sire Records. Uncut magazine reviewed their first (and only) album Sparkly Things (produced by Julian Standen of The Lemonheads), describing it as "dulcet adolescent vocals, and a thorough grasp of commercial rock dynamics producing an appealing sound redolent of the early Undertones". The band played Reading festival 1998. Courtney enjoyed the experience of touring and recording, and teamed up with his brother, Alper and several others to form the indie pop band The Sunset Sound, which received some airplay before the band members dissolved the band as not representing their style. The band's music had been inspired by a project Courtney was involved in while studying at the University of Westminster, creating new original music for the 1960s television show The Prisoner.

Along with his brother and Alper, Courtney came together with Greg Jong and Jim Dobson to form Pure Reason Revolution. The band's name was inspired by Courtney's thesis on the nature of genius and its application to Beach Boy Brian Wilson, for which he studied Critique of Pure Reason by Immanuel Kant.

The band's first album, The Dark Third, was released in 2006 by Sony BMG, and was produced by Paul Northfield. Amor Vincit Omnia and Hammer and Anvil followed in 2009 and 2010, on Superball Music. The band played many live shows and festivals, including support for Porcupine Tree, Mew, Oceansize and others, and were in turn supported by Clean Bandit at London's Scala.

Courtney also worked as a DJ in this period, using the name Cedo Simplex and collaborating with Jamie Kossoff as KC Blitz. Following the breakup of Pure Reason Revolution in 2011, Courtney moved to Berlin, where he formed the electronic-rock band Bullet Height together with Sammi Doll, a performer with Kat Von D, Losers and IAMX. Bullet Height released their debut album No Atonement in 2017, on Superball Music.

Pure Reason Revolution reformed in 2019, with Courtney, Alper and Jong performing new shows and releasing new albums Eupnea and Above Cirrus in 2020 and 2022 respectively, both on InsideOutMusic.

== Songwriting ==
According to Alper, the music of Pure Reason Revolution "grew organically from Jon's songs and influences". The band's prevalent use of harmony, described by Disorder Magazine as a "trademark", is credited to Courtney. Courtney's songwriting draws inspiration from such bands as Nirvana, the Beach Boys, the Chemical Brothers and Crosby Stills & Nash. In 2005, Gigwise.com, which termed Courtney the "creative force" behind the band, described his music "amazingly intricate", while Classic Rock Magazine, speaking of Amor Vincit Omnia, commented, "once other-worldly, PRR now sound like some mutant offspring of The Chemical Brothers & NIN". According to Rock Sound, Hammer and Anvil "retained most of [the band's] heavy hooks to create a great crossover record". Prog magazine called Above Cirrus "densely packed...a multi-faceted beast that revels in Floydian waves of intoxicated bliss before erupting into an apocalyptic fury".

Courtney acknowledges that his lyrics are often directly inspired by his dreams, which he frequently writes down.

== DJ ==
- Cedo Simplex: Courtney played regular club nights as part of the DJ set All Bangers, No Mash, and released a remix of the Pure Reason Revolution single "Victorious Cupid".
- KC Blitz: Along with Jamie Kossoff (K), Courtney (C) made remixes for the likes of Asking Alexandria, The Word Alive, Boxer Rebellion, Norma Jean, and Bring Me the Horizon. The remixes were released on these bands' respective albums, including on Bring Me the Horizon's all-remix album Suicide Season: Cut Up! and Asking Alexandria's Stepped Up and Scratched.

== Equipment ==
Guitars

- Sunburst Fender Jazzmaster
- Candy Apple Red Fender Jaguar
- Blue Fender Jaguar
- Blue Fender Telecaster – Rarely used. Often used by PRR guitarist Jamie Willcox.

Basses

- Salmon Pink Fender Bronco Bass – only used live for "Asleep Under Eiderdown".

Strings

- Ernie Ball Regular Slinky's (tuned to either Drop D or C♯)
- Ernie Ball Skinny Top, Heavy Bottom for "Deus Ex Machina" and "In Aurelia" (tuned to Drop B)

Effects/Amplification

- Binson Echo Unit
- Boss Effects
- Line 6 Effects
- Marshall Amplification

Synthesizers

- Teisco 110F
