= The Peel Sessions (Pulp album) =

Live album by Pulp
- Released: 23 October 2006
- Recorded: 1981–2001
- Genres: Britpop, alternative rock
- Label: Island
- Producers: Sam Cunningham, Dave Dade, Mike Engles, Dale Griffin, Chris Lycett, Andy Rodgers

Pulp chronology
Hits (2002)	The Peel Sessions (2006)	More (2025)

Professional ratings
Review scores
Source	Rating
Allmusic	4.5/5 stars
Pitchfork Media	(8.4/10)

The Peel Sessions is a double live album by Pulp released on 23 October 2006, containing the recordings the band made for John Peel's Radio 1 show and live performances which had been broadcast by the BBC.

== Background ==
The first disc features all songs performed "live in the studio" during the band's four visits to the John Peel show. The first performance include previously unreleased material from Pulp's earliest era. Other three sessions are from His 'n' Hers, Different Class and We Love Life periods. The last track on CD 1 is "Duck Diving", which is actually Jarvis Cocker's reading of a story Return to Air, written by Philippa Pearce.

The second disc consist of actual live performances. It opens with Pulp's complete set performed at the BBC's 40 Years in Broadcasting Celebrations for John Peel. The remainder are portions of performances which were broadcast by the BBC.

== Track listing ==
Disc one

1. "Turkey Mambo Momma" (Jarvis Cocker) – 2:54
2. "Please Don't Worry" (Cocker) – 3:21
3. "Wishful Thinking" (Cocker) – 4:18
4. "Refuse to Be Blind" (Cocker) – 4:28
5. "Pink Glove" (Nick Banks, Cocker, Candida Doyle, Steve Mackey, Russell Senior) – 5:09
6. "You're a Nightmare" (Banks, Cocker, Doyle, Mackey, Senior) – 5:21
7. "Acrylic Afternoons" (Banks, Cocker, Doyle, Mackey, Senior) – 3:46
8. "Underwear" (Banks, Cocker, Doyle, Mackey, Senior) – 4:13
9. "Common People" (Banks, Cocker, Doyle, Mackey, Senior) – 5:53
10. "Pencil Skirt" (Banks, Cocker, Doyle, Mackey, Senior, Mark Webber) – 3:24
11. "Sunrise" (Banks, Cocker, Doyle, Mackey, Peter Mansell, Webber) – 5:58
12. "Weeds" (Banks, Cocker, Doyle, Mackey, Webber) – 3:46
13. "I Love Life" (Banks, Cocker, Doyle, Mackey, Webber) – 5:10
14. "Duck Diving" (Banks, Cocker, Doyle, Mackey, Webber, Philippa Pearce) – 6:34
- All tracks recorded in John Peel's studio.
- Tracks 1–4 recorded on 7 November 1981.
- Tracks 5–7 recorded on 7 February 1993.
- Tracks 8–10 recorded on 9 September 1994.
- Tracks 11–14 recorded on 12 August 2001.

Disc two

1. "Theme from Peter Gunn" (Henry Mancini) – 4:06
2. "Sorted for E's & Wizz" (Banks, Cocker, Doyle, Mackey, Senior, Webber) – 4:11
3. "Help the Aged" (Banks, Cocker, Doyle, Mackey, Webber) – 4:14
4. "This Is Hardcore" (Banks, Cocker, Doyle, Mackey, Webber, Peter Thomas) – 7:05
5. "Sunrise" (Banks, Cocker, Doyle, Mackey, Mansell, Webber) – 6:06
6. "Mile End" (Banks, Cocker, Doyle, Mackey, Senior, Webber) – 4:29
7. "Do You Remember the First Time?" (Banks, Cocker, Doyle, Mackey, Senior) – 4:00
8. "Babies" (Banks, Cocker, Doyle, Mackey, Senior) – 4:10
9. "Weeds" (Banks, Cocker, Doyle, Mackey, Webber) – 3:44
10. "Weeds II (The Origin Of the Species)" (Banks, Cocker, Doyle, Mackey, Webber) – 4:52
11. "The Fear" (Banks, Cocker, Doyle, Mackey, Webber) – 5:23
12. "The Trees" (Banks, Cocker, Doyle, Mackey, Webber) – 4:42
13. "I Love Life" (Banks, Cocker, Doyle, Mackey, Webber) – 4:44
14. "Party Hard" (Banks, Cocker, Doyle, Mackey, Webber) – 4:41
15. "Common People" (Banks, Cocker, Doyle, Mackey, Senior) – 7:34
- Tracks 1–5 recorded on Kings College, 11 October 2001.
- Tracks 6–8 recorded on Bristol Anson, 21 April 1995.
- Tracks 9–15 recorded on Birmingham Academy, 31 October 2001.

== Musicians ==
- Jarvis Cocker - vocals, guitar, percussion (appears on all recordings)
- Russell Senior - guitar, violin (1993–1995 recordings)
- Candida Doyle - keyboards (1993–2001 recordings)
- Mark Webber - guitar (1994–2001 recordings)
- Steve Mackey - bass (1993–2001 recordings)
- Nick Banks - drums (1993–2001 recordings)
- Richard Hawley - guitar (2001 recordings)
- Peter Dalton - synthesiser, organ, guitar, backing vocals, xylophone, percussion (1981 recordings)
- Jamie Pinchbeck - bass, percussion (1981 recordings)
- Wayne Furniss - drums, percussion (1981 recordings)
