= Hits (Pulp album) =

Compilation album by Pulp
- Released: 18 November 2002
- Recorded: 1992–2002
- Genre: Britpop, indie rock
- Length: 75:57
- Label: Island
- Producer: Ed Buller, Chris Thomas, Scott Walker, Cameron Craig

Pulp chronology
We Love Life (2001)	Hits (2002)	The Peel Sessions (2006)

Hits is a greatest hits collection by the English rock band Pulp, released in November 2002.

== Background ==
As a collection, Hits only covers Pulp's singles from the 1990s when they hit the mainstream, although the band had existed in one form or another since 1978.

Hits includes all of Pulp's A-sides released from "Babies" in 1992 to "Bad Cover Version" in 2002, with the exception of "Mis-Shapes" from Different Class, apparently because, by the time the compilation was released, the band could no longer stand the song. In its place is "Underwear", an album track from Different Class.

The tracklisting is ordered chronologically by release date, with the exception of Pulp's last single "Bad Cover Version", which instead appears between "The Trees" and "Sunrise" (the latter two tracks having originally been released together as a double A-side single).

Two other singles, "Common People" and "Disco 2000", are presented in their Different Class album mixes rather than their more familiar (but since deleted) "hit" single versions.

The first and second singles, "Babies" and "Razzmatazz", were originally released on Pulp's previous record label, Gift Records. The rest of the singles were released after the band signed to Island Records.

The band were contractually obligated to record a new song for inclusion on Hits. The resulting song, "Last Day of the Miners' Strike", appears as the last track on the album. It contains a sample of "South American Getaway" by Burt Bacharach, and refers to the UK miner's strike of 1984–1985.

An accompanying DVD was also released under the same title, featuring the band's promotional videos from the same era, a number of live performances, documentaries and short movies.

Professional ratings
Review scores
Source	Rating
AllMusic	5/5 stars
Drowned in Sound	9/10 stars
NME	9/10 stars
PopMatters	(favorable)
Stylus Magazine	A+

== Track listing ==
=== CD ===
No.	Title	Writer(s)	Length
1.	"Babies" (Non-album single, 1992)	Nick Banks, Jarvis Cocker, Candida Doyle, Steve Mackey, Russell Senior	4:05
2.	"Razzmatazz" (Non-album single, 1993)	Banks, Cocker, Doyle, Mackey, Senior	3:40
3.	"Lipgloss" (from His 'n' Hers, 1994)	Banks, Cocker, Doyle, Mackey, Senior	3:35
4.	"Do You Remember the First Time?" (from His 'n' Hers, 1994)	Banks, Cocker, Doyle, Mackey, Senior	4:20
5.	"Common People" (from Different Class, 1995)	Banks, Cocker, Doyle, Mackey, Senior	5:50
6.	"Underwear" (from Different Class, 1995)	Banks, Cocker, Doyle, Mackey, Senior	4:05
7.	"Sorted for E's & Wizz" (from Different Class, 1995)	Banks, Cocker, Doyle, Mackey, Senior, Mark Webber	3:37
8.	"Disco 2000" (from Different Class, 1995)	Banks, Cocker, Doyle, Mackey, Senior, Webber	4:33
9.	"Something Changed" (from Different Class, 1995)	Banks, Cocker, Doyle, Mackey, Senior, Webber	3:18
10.	"Help the Aged" (from This Is Hardcore, 1998)	Banks, Cocker, Doyle, Mackey, Webber	4:27
11.	"This Is Hardcore" (from This Is Hardcore, 1998)	Banks, Cocker, Doyle, Mackey, Webber, Peter Thomas	6:26
12.	"A Little Soul" (from This Is Hardcore, 1998)	Banks, Cocker, Doyle, Mackey, Webber	3:18
13.	"Party Hard" (from This Is Hardcore, 1998)	Banks, Cocker, Doyle, Mackey, Webber	4:01
14.	"The Trees" (from We Love Life, 2001)	Banks, Cocker, Doyle, Mackey, Webber	4:48
15.	"Bad Cover Version" (from We Love Life, 2001)	Banks, Cocker, Doyle, Mackey, Webber	4:16
16.	"Sunrise" (from We Love Life, 2001)	Banks, Cocker, Doyle, Mackey, Webber, Peter Mansell	6:11
17.	"Last Day of the Miners' Strike" (Previously unreleased)	Banks, Cocker, Doyle, Mackey, Webber, Richard Hawley, Burt Bacharach	5:55

Note: "Underwear" appears on the UK version of the album only – however it is listed in error on the sleeve of the Canadian version.

=== DVD ===
Promotional videos
No.	Title	Writer(s)	Length
1.	"Babies (original version)" (1992)	Nick Banks, Jarvis Cocker, Candida Doyle, Steve Mackey, Russell Senior
2.	"Razzmatazz" (1992)	Banks, Cocker, Doyle, Mackey, Senior
3.	"Lipgloss" (1993)	Banks, Cocker, Doyle, Mackey, Senior
4.	"Do You Remember the First Time?" (1994)	Banks, Cocker, Doyle, Mackey, Senior
5.	"Babies (1994 version)" (1994)	Banks, Cocker, Doyle, Mackey, Senior
6.	"Common People" (1995)	Banks, Cocker, Doyle, Mackey, Senior
7.	"Sorted for E's & Wizz" (1995)	Banks, Cocker, Doyle, Mackey, Senior, Webber
8.	"Mis-Shapes" (1995)	Banks, Cocker, Doyle, Mackey, Senior, Webber
9.	"Disco 2000" (1995)	Banks, Cocker, Doyle, Mackey, Senior, Webber
10.	"Something Changed" (1996)	Banks, Cocker, Doyle, Mackey, Senior, Webber
11.	"Help the Aged" (1997)	Banks, Cocker, Doyle, Mackey, Webber
12.	"This Is Hardcore" (1998)	Banks, Cocker, Doyle, Mackey, Webber, Thomas
13.	"A Little Soul" (1998)	Banks, Cocker, Doyle, Mackey, Webber
14.	"Party Hard" (1998)	Banks, Cocker, Doyle, Mackey, Webber
15.	"The Trees" (2001)	Banks, Cocker, Doyle, Mackey, Webber
16.	"Bad Cover Version" (2002)	Banks, Cocker, Doyle, Mackey, Webber

Live performances
No.	Title	Writer(s)	Length
1.	"Joyriders" (The Beat, ITV, March 1994)	Banks, Cocker, Doyle, Mackey, Senior
2.	"59 Lyndhurst Grove" (No Stilletos, BBC2, August 1993)	Banks, Cocker, Doyle, Mackey, Senior
3.	"Sorted for E's & Wizz" (The Brits, ITV, February 1996)	Banks, Cocker, Doyle, Mackey, Senior, Webber
4.	"Dishes" (Later with Jools Holland, BBC2, May 1998)	Banks, Cocker, Doyle, Mackey, Webber
5.	"Sunrise" (Pulp at the Eden Project, BBC Choice, July 2002)	Banks, Cocker, Doyle, Mackey, Webber, Mansell

Short films

- Do You Remember the First Time? (documentary)
- "Babies" (spoken word version)
- This Is Hardcore (documentary)

Home movies

- TV Madness
- Sheffield Bands
- Home Movies
- Catcliffe

== Personnel ==
- Ed Buller – producer (tracks: 1 to 4), mixing (tracks: 1, 3, 4)
- Chris Thomas – producer (tracks: 5 to 13)
- Scott Walker – producer (tracks: 14 to 16)
- Peter Walsh – co-producer (tracks: 14 to 16)
- Cameron Craig – producer (track 17)
- Tim Burrell – mastering
- Jarvis Cocker – art direction
- Peter Saville – art direction
- Simon Periton – cover image
- Howard Wakefield – design
- Willie Seldon – photography

== Charts ==
Chart (2002–2003)	Peak position
Scottish Albums (OCC)	33
UK Albums (OCC)	71

== Certifications ==
Region	Certification	Certified units/sales
United Kingdom (BPI)	Platinum	300,000^{‡}
^{‡} Sales+streaming figures based on certification alone.
