= Something Changed =

1996 single by Pulp

- Boy CD

Single by Pulp

from the album Different Class
- B-side: "Mile End"; "F.E.E.L.I.N.G.C.A.L.L.E.D.L.O.V.E"
- Released: 25 March 1996
- Genre: Britpop
- Length: 3:19
- Label: Island
- Songwriter: Pulp
- Producer: Chris Thomas

Pulp singles chronology
"Disco 2000" (1995)	"Something Changed" (1996)	"Help the Aged" (1997)

Alternative cover
- Girl CD

"Something Changed" is a song by Britpop band Pulp, released on their 1995 album, Different Class. Written much earlier in the band's existence but revived for the Different Class sessions, "Something Changed" features lyrics that focused on the random nature as to how important events happen in life. The song also features a guitar solo performed by guitarist Mark Webber.

"Something Changed" was released as the fourth and final single from Different Class, reaching number 10 on the UK Singles Chart and number 30 in both Iceland and Ireland. It has since received critical acclaim.

== Background ==
According to guitarist Mark Webber, the song "was an old song that Jarvis dredged up and we all dusted off. There's a rehearsal tape of a previous incarnation of Pulp attempting it circa 1984." Cocker explained:

It was originally written about 12 years ago. My sister sang an early version, but it had different words. It never got used, and then I just remembered it. Because it had been written such a long time ago it made me wonder what I was doing then. And I worked out that it must have been written quite near to me meeting this girl. It's just wondering, really. If I hadn't gone out and met this particular person in this particular nightclub, and formed a relationship with her, how different would my life have been? So it's not really about fate, it's more about the randomness of things. Which I like. As I've said before, that's the main thing I feel is missing from my life. The worst thing about having a schedule and a timetable is that there's less chance for unexpected things to happen.

Webber himself contributed the song's guitar solo; he recalled, "'Something Changed' is the first guitar solo I've sat and written, but I didn't let anyone else know about it until we went into the studio and did it."

Cocker said of the song in 2020, "That's the one Pulp song that seems to crop up. I've been stopped by a lot of people who tell me that song was played at their wedding. They walked down the aisle to it!"

== Release ==
"Something Changed" was released as the fourth and final single from Different Class on 25 March 1996. The song was initially available as two CD singles and a cassette single, but on 7 October 1996, a third format—a pink 7-inch single—was issued. The single was released with two different sleeves (a "boy" and "girl" version), but with identical track listings. Like the other singles from the album, the song charted within the top 10 in the UK, reaching number 10. The song also appeared on the Pulp compilation album Hits.

The B-side, "Mile End", appeared on the Trainspotting soundtrack album and became a number-one hit in Iceland, where it was the second-most-successful song of 1996. The single also features a remixed version of "F.E.E.L.I.N.G.C.A.L.L.E.D.L.O.V.E" produced by Moloko. At the time of the single's release, Cocker said of Moloko, "I like Moloko. They've done a remix of "F.E.E.L.I.N.G.C.A.L.L.E.D.L.O.V.E" on this new single. I predict great things for them this year."

== Reception ==
"Something Changed" has seen critical acclaim since its release. Robert Christgau of The Village Voice wrote in his review of Different Class, "If 'Common People' should fall short, I recommend Island proceed directly to 'Something Changed,' a happy love song every bit as clever and realistic as his class war song." David Fricke of Rolling Stone praised the song's "delightfully cheesy loser's-lounge blend of strings and low, throaty guitar twang," while Simon Reynolds of Pitchfork said that the song was "a straightforwardly romantic and gorgeously touching song about the unknown and unknowable turning points in anyone's life." Adrien Begrand of PopMatters called the song "sweet."

== Track listings ==
All lyrics are written by Jarvis Cocker; all music is composed by Jarvis Cocker, Nick Banks, Steve Mackey, Russell Senior, Candida Doyle and Mark Webber.

UK CD single
No.	Title	Length
1.	"Something Changed"
2.	"Mile End" (from the film Trainspotting)
3.	"F.E.E.L.I.N.G.C.A.L.L.E.D.L.O.V.E" (the Moloko mix)
4.	"F.E.E.L.I.N.G.C.A.L.L.E.D.L.O.V.E" (live at the Brixton Academy)

UK 7-inch and cassette single
No.	Title	Length
1.	"Something Changed"
2.	"Mile End" (from the film Trainspotting)

== Personnel ==
- Written by Pulp
- Lyrics by Jarvis Cocker
- Jarvis Cocker: Vocals, Electric Guitar
- Mark Webber: Electric Guitar
- Candida Doyle: Keyboards
- Russell Senior: Acoustic Guitar
- Steve Mackey: Bass Guitar
- Nick Banks: Drums

== Charts ==
=== Weekly charts ===
Chart (1996)	Peak position
Europe (Eurochart Hot 100)	57
Iceland (Íslenski Listinn Topp 40)	30
Ireland (IRMA)	30
Israel (IBA)	11
Scotland Singles (Official Charts)	12
UK Singles (Official Charts)	10

=== Year-end charts ===
Chart (1996)	Position
UK Airplay (Music Week)	50

== Covers ==
Spanish band Astrud released an album of rarities and B-sides called Algo cambió (Spanish for Something Changed) which featured a Spanish-language version of the song.
