= Mis-Shapes =

1995 single by Pulp

- CD1 cover

Single by Pulp

from the album Different Class
- A-side: "Sorted for E's & Wizz"
- Released: 25 September 1995
- Genre: Britpop
- Length: 3:46
- Label: Island
- Songwriters: Jarvis Branson Cocker, Mark Andrew Webber, Russell Senior, Candida Doyle, Stephen Patrick Mackey, Nick Banks
- Producer: Chris Thomas

Pulp singles chronology
"Common People" (1995)	"Mis-Shapes" / "Sorted for E's & Wizz" (1995)	"Disco 2000" (1995)

"Mis-Shapes" is a song written and released by English alternative rock band Pulp from their fifth album, Different Class (1995). Lyrically inspired by Cocker's experiences socializing in Sheffield as an outcast, the song features lyrics that call for misfits to unite and take over. This lyrical theme would make Cocker uncomfortable with Pulp's growing popularity with "townies" after the song's release.

"Mis-Shapes" was released as a double-A sided single with "Sorted for E's & Wizz", the second single from Different Class after "Common People." Like its predecessor, the single reached number two in the UK charts and has since seen critical acclaim.

== Background ==
"Mis-Shapes" was written as an ode to the outcasts that Pulp as a band identified with. Drummer Nick Banks summed up the song's message, stating, "What an opener, a call to arms, a rallying cry, now is the time to storm the barricades. If you've ever been bullied, called a weirdo, hit, spat at for being, looking, or feeling different... this is your tune!" At a 1995 concert, frontman Jarvis Cocker introduced the song as a call to take on the "blokes with 'taches in short-sleeved white shirts telling you that you're the weirdo."

Lyrically, the song was inspired by Cocker's experience going to clubs in his home town of Sheffield during the 1980s. He recalled:

It was quite dangerous to go into the centre of town on a weekend night, as everyone socialised there. You'd get these packs of blokes, all dressed the same in the white short-sleeved shirt, black trousers and loafers, and they'd call you a queer or want to smack you 'cos they didn't like your jacket. The thing is, those people hunt in packs, whereas the misfits or mis-shapes, because of the fact that they're more individualistic, are easier targets. So the idea of 'Mis-Shapes' is the fancy that the misfits would form some kind of an alliance or army, and take over.

Cocker reflected on the song's contradiction with the laddish audience the Britpop scene attracted, "All you can do is be as precise and be as good at what you do as possible and throw it out there. You can't control who goes into the shop and buys your records, you can't say, 'Oh, we're going to move into a more mature market.' People have to decide that. I mean, you write a song like 'Mis-Shapes' and it should be perfectly clear that it's saying, 'I don't like intolerant people.' But it's become clear to me after that last tour that it goes over some people's heads. Townies were coming out to see us."

The song's guitar solo was initially composed by Cocker, but its final version was modified by recently joined guitarist Mark Webber, who called the song one of his favourites in 1996. The song's title, according to Cocker, originates from his "mum buying mis-shaped chocolates." Cocker recalled, "'Mis-Shapes' are these chocolates and they used to have them in the sweet-shop next to our house. They were the ones that had gone wrong in the factory - they were misshapen - kind of 'elephant man' of the sweet world! You could buy them in a bag much cheaper than a normal box of chocolates would be and they tasted as good, it's just that aesthetically they weren't that pleasing so that seemed to be a fairly reasonable metaphor."

== Lyrics and music ==
Deborah Orr of The Guardian described "Mis-Shapes" as "the song that contains Cocker's statement of intent," while The Telegraph called the track "[Cocker's] anthem to nerd youth, a battle-cry to misfits everywhere." Cocker said of the song's lyrical content:

I've always had a problem with songs that tried to tackle social issues. I'm thinking of 'Another Day in Paradise', I'm thinking of 'Belfast Child'. Mis-Shapes is probably the nearest I've got to a sloganeering song for the sake of it. I think I just scraped through because it's based on the feeling of a Saturday night in Sheffield when the beer monsters are out, wanting to smack you because you're wearing funny glasses, a funny haircut and orange trousers - and you have to run away.

David Stubbs of Melody Maker described the song as "musically is so cleverly redolent of the glitzy plasticity of glam but also lino on bedsit floors." Stephen Thomas Erlewine of AllMusic called the song a "faux-show tune romp."

== Release ==
"Mis-Shapes" was released as a double A-sided single with "Sorted for E's & Wizz" on 25 September 1995. The double-A sided single reached number two on the UK Singles Chart, though the single did attract controversy due to the drug themes of "Sorted for E's and Wizz". It was Pulp's second successive number-two hit in 1995, with "Common People" having reached the same position in June. As a standalone single, "Mis-Shapes" reached number 15 in Finland and number 25 in Sweden. In the UK, on 7 October 1996, a 7-inch single with a blue vinyl disc was issued.

Despite being one of Pulp's biggest hits it did not appear on their best of album Hits. Cocker reflected on the song in 1999, "I can't really listen to that song anymore to be honest but I know at the time I was quite excited. It was like all the kind of speccy losers were coming out the libraries and taking over. That was my idea. It was a nice idea but unfortunately it didn't quite happen did it?"

== Music video ==
The band also produced a music video for the song where Cocker appeared as both the singer of the band and as a "blokey" character that spat beer in the face of his "misfit" performer role. Cocker explained, "In the 'Mis-Shapes' video I acted, which is something I was very dubious about because pop stars acting is normally very tragic. Let's mention Sting there. So, being dubious, I got very drunk to do it. And then I started getting into it, I could see the attraction was not giving a shit about anything."

The background extras were found at a club; Cocker stated, "The kids they got for the video were from this really savage nightclub, and they were totally intimidating everybody on the set - they weren't acting. But I liked it, because after all this time of running away from these people I could be one for two days."

== Reception ==
"Mis-Shapes" has seen positive reception from critics. Awarding it five out of five and "best new single" in Smash Hits, Mark Sutherland called the song "a brilliant rallying call to anyone else who's ever felt they didn't quite fit in. Like 'Common People,' it's an epic single, all spiralling keyboards and brilliant lyrics." Time Out praised the song as "a splenetic, stuttering, demolition of all the people who made Jarvis's life a misery before fate knocked on the wrong door and made him a sex symbol." Melody Maker's David Stubbs described "Mis-Shapes" as "a song that so brazenly pushes all of the right buttons, it's hard to see how they were ever anything less than an instant pop success." Rolling Stone's David Fricke called the song "a blast of plastic, fantastic vengeance against the plebes, sort of the Pet Shop Boys meet the Clash's 'White Riot.'"

NME readers ranked the song as Pulp's seventh best in a fan vote. The Guardian named it as one of Pulp's ten best songs, writing, "It's an intellectual putsch, a nerdy spring, and it's still as convincing today as it was back then".

== Track listing ==
All songs written and composed by Jarvis Cocker, Nick Banks, Steve Mackey, Russell Senior, Candida Doyle and Mark Webber; except where noted.

- 7-inch vinyl and cassette single
1. "Mis-Shapes" – 3:45
2. "Sorted for E's & Wizz" – 3:42
- CD single one (Catalogue no. CID 620) and 12-inch vinyl
1. "Mis-Shapes" – 3:45
2. "Sorted for E's & Wizz" – 3:42
3. "P.T.A. (Parent Teacher Association)" – 3:15
4. "Common People" (Live at Glastonbury) (Jarvis Cocker, Nick Banks, Steve Mackey, Russell Senior, Candida Doyle) – 7:38
- CD single two (Catalogue no. CIDX 620)
1. "Sorted for E's & Wizz" – 3:42
2. "Mis-Shapes" – 3:45
3. "Common People" (Motiv 8 Club Mix) (Cocker, Banks, Mackey, Senior, Doyle) – 7:50
4. "Common People" (Vocoda Mix) (Cocker, Banks, Mackey, Senior, Doyle) – 6:18

== Personnel ==
- Jarvis Cocker: Vocals, Acoustic Guitar
- Russell Senior: Electric Guitar
- Mark Webber: Electric Guitar
- Candida Doyle: Piano, Synthesizers
- Anne Dudley: Strings
- Steve Mackey: Bass Guitar
- Nick Banks: Drums

== Charts ==
=== Weekly charts ===
==== "Mis-Shapes" ====
Chart (1995)	Peak position
Europe (European Hit Radio)	32
Finland (Suomen virallinen lista)	15
Israel (IBA)	27
Sweden (Sverigetopplistan)	25

==== "Mis-Shapes" / "Sorted for E's & Wizz" ====
Chart (1995)	Peak position
Europe (Eurochart Hot 100)	15
Ireland (IRMA)	6
Scotland Singles (Official Charts)	2
UK Singles (Official Charts)	2

=== Year-end charts ===
Chart (1995)	Position
UK Singles (OCC)	50

== Certifications ==
Region	Certification	Certified units/sales
United Kingdom (BPI)	Silver	200,000^{^}
^{^} Shipments figures based on certification alone.
