= O.U. (Gone, Gone) =

Single by Pulp
- B-side: "Space"
- Released: 26 June 1992
- Recorded: Fon Studios, Sheffield, February 1992
- Genre: Britpop
- Length: 2:56 (Radio Edit); 3:34 (12" Mix)
- Label: Gift
- Songwriter(s): Jarvis Cocker, Russell Senior, Steve Mackey, Nick Banks and Candida Doyle
- Producer(s): Mike Timm, Pulp, Simon Hinkler

Pulp singles chronology
"Countdown" (1992)	"O.U. (Gone, Gone)" (1992)	"Babies" (1992)

"O.U. (Gone, Gone)" is a song written and released by British pop band Pulp in 1992. Recorded with producer and former Pulp member Simon Hinkler, "O.U." would be the band's first single with Gift Records, with whom the band signed after conflicting with indie label Fire.

"O.U. (Gone, Gone)" did not chart in the UK, though it did attract positive reception from music critics. The song was later included on the compilation album Intro – The Gift Recordings in 1993.

== Background ==
During the sessions that produced "O.U.", an early version of "Babies" was recorded, but it was passed over for single release at the time. Hinkler recalled, "I always thought 'Babies' should have been the A-side. It's so obviously the single from that session, whereas 'O.U.' was probably the worst of the bunch. Jarvis enjoyed being difficult about such things."

"O.U." was the first single released by the band on their new label, Gift Records. The band had conflicted with their old label, Fire Records. Cocker recalled,

We were desperate to get off Fire. We got involved with Warp imprint Gift, we played in France with Blur and Lush, which was very exciting - we'd never been outside the U K. We met [PR] John Best, he was going out with Miki [Berenyi] from Lush. He suggested we go and talk to Geoff [Travis] and Jeanette [Lee, from Rough Trade] who agreed to help us even though we'd signed a five-album deal. We just decided, let's do something and see what Fire do. On the day 'O.U.' came out, they released Separations that had been in limbo for three years, and claimed it was coincidence.

Lyrically, the song was described by Sian Pattenden of the NME as "about train stations."

== Release and reception ==
"O.U." was released as a single in June 1992. The single included the song "Space" on the B-side. Though neither song would be released on a Pulp studio album, both songs appeared on the compilation Intro – The Gift Recordings in 1993.

Stephen Thomas Erlewine of AllMusic wrote that the song demonstrated "the band's knack for creating terrific pop singles [that] prevents them from being too pretentious." Stuart Maconie of Select Magazine named the song, alongside the band's other Gift Records singles, as "funny, endearing and sometimes slightly nightmarish."

== Track listing ==
All songs written and composed by Jarvis Cocker, Russell Senior, Steve Mackey, Nick Banks and Candida Doyle.

CD single

1. "O.U. (Gone, Gone)" (radio edit) – 2:56
2. "O.U. (Gone, Gone)" (12" mix) – 3:34
3. "Space" – 5:13

12" vinyl

1. "O.U. (Gone, Gone)" (12" mix) – 3:34
2. "Space" – 5:13
3. " O.U. (Gone, Gone)" (radio edit) – 2:56
