= The Sisters EP =

1994 single by Pulp

EP by Pulp
- Released: 23 May 1994
- Studio: Britania Row (London, England)
- Length: 19:13
- Label: Island
- Producer: Ed Buller

Pulp chronology
"Do You Remember the First Time?" (1994)	The Sisters EP (1994)	"Common People" (1995)

The Sisters EP is an EP by English rock band Pulp released in May 1994. It was their third release after the band signed to Island Records and it reached number 19 on the UK Singles Chart, becoming their highest chart position at the time.

== Overview ==
"Babies" was originally released as a single on the Gift record label in 1992 – the version on this EP is an edited and remixed version. The other three tracks were recorded during the His 'n' Hers sessions, but were not included on that album. The entire single was re-released for the first time on the His 'n' Hers 2006 2-disc deluxe edition re-issue.

Ed Buller is the producer of "His 'n' Hers", "Your Sister's Clothes" and "Seconds"; however the producer of "Babies" is less certain. But the credits for 2006 re-issue of His 'n' Hers which includes "Babies" does not mention another producer for the track (CD1 track 5) despite including a number of tracks as exceptions for other reasons.

=== The songs ===
"Babies" is a song about the narrator and his relationship with two sisters. The two sisters are revisited in the EP's second track "Your Sister's Clothes" with the younger sister getting revenge, both with the man, and by wearing her elder sister's clothes and making fun of them.

The other two songs do not relate to the story of "Babies". "Seconds" is a critical look at 'normal married life' via the story of a wife married and pregnant by the brother of her old boyfriend who is left sexually unsatisfied and bored, dreaming of being free at night only to wake up to another monotonous day the same as the last. The rejection of normal life is a common theme in rock music and one that is revisited by the EP's final track "His 'n' Hers" this time focusing on the male of the partnership who is scared of settling down, expressing this via a fear of interior decorating.

== Music video ==
Pedro Romhanyi directed a new video for "Babies", Pulp had previously shot one in 1992 for the original single release.

The sisters in the original video for "Babies" were played by Selina and Sophie, who Jarvis Cocker met at the house of Bob Stanley of Saint Etienne. Selina is the same girl who appears holding the sign on the cover to Saint Etienne's debut album Foxbase Alpha.

== Track listing ==
All songs were written and composed by Jarvis Cocker, Russell Senior, Steve Mackey, Nick Banks and Candida Doyle.

7-inch, 12-inch, CD, and cassette EP

1. "Babies" – 3:59
2. "Your Sister's Clothes" – 4:37
3. "Seconds" – 4:18
4. "His 'n' Hers" – 6:19
