= Do You Remember the First Time? =

"Do You Remember The First Time?"

Single by Pulp

from the album His 'n' Hers
- Released: 21 March 1994
- Genre: Britpop
- Length: 4:23
- Label: Island
- Songwriter: Pulp
- Producer: Ed Buller

Pulp singles chronology
| "Lipgloss" (1993) | "Do You Remember The First Time?" (1994) | "The Sisters EP" (1994) |

"Do You Remember the First Time?" is a song by British rock band Pulp, taken from their fourth studio album, His 'n' Hers (1994). With lyrics loosely based on Pulp frontman Jarvis Cocker's loss of virginity, the song saw some controversy for its sexual topic. Released as the second single from His 'n' Hers, the song reached number 33 in the UK, becoming the band's first top-40 hit in that country. The single was accompanied by a lengthy music video featuring celebrities discussing how they lost their virginity. The song has since become one of the band's most famous songs and has seen critical acclaim. The track also notably served as the band's opening song on their reunion tour setlist.

== Background ==
"Do You Remember the First Time?" features lyrics about losing one's virginity written by Pulp frontman Jarvis Cocker. Cocker loosely based his lyrics on the moment that he lost his virginity at the age of nineteen; he reportedly lost it with the purpose of losing it as a teenager. Cocker later recalled of the moment, "I have no regrets about the first person I had sex with. We were both virgins, so neither of us were under any pressure to perform. It probably took me a long time to get any good at it, to get reasonable at sex... I still don't know."

Because of the song's lyrical content, the band received some backlash. Cocker explained, "We got a bit of stick for the fact that 'Do You Remember the First Time?' was about sex, but it just seemed like a good subject, because it interests everybody. I mean, everybody's had a first time, or if they haven't, they're always thinking about it. Everyone's got a story to tell." Musically, the song featured uncredited contributions to then-touring guitarist Mark Webber, who, after years of collaborating with Pulp, would join the band in 1995. He recalled, "I did write part of 'Do You Remember The First Time?' [which] caused a bit of trouble for a while, I think, so I shut up about it. It was all a bit complicated, I wasn't really sure if I wanted to be more involved or not."

== Lyrics ==
The lyrics to "Do You Remember the First Time?" discuss losing one's virginity, though it also features the narrator pleading with a girl who is seeing someone else. As Stereogum's Ryan Leas writes, "The title of course always pointed towards losing your virginity, but the narrative of the song also had to do with a man addressing his lover who keeps returning to another man."

Because of the song's title and its use as the band's opening song during its reunion shows, it has been described by Leas as "a rallying cry for the Pulp reunion." Brad Sanders, also of Stereogum, wrote of the song's resonance during the band's reunion, "By starting their shows with 'Do You Remember the First Time?,' Pulp concedes that reunion tours are essentially nostalgia trips for a large portion of the audience. If you do remember the first time you saw Pulp, you want to relive it. If you don't, all you want is a credible facsimile." Sometimes, a "sanitised" version of the song was aired on TV and radio, with the lyric "I don't care if you screw him" changed to "I don't care if you knew him".

== Release ==
"Do You Remember the First Time" was released 21 March 1994 as the second single from the album, after "Lipgloss". The single charted at number 33 in the UK Singles Chart, the highest position the band reached to that point and the first Pulp single to reach the UK top 40. Cocker recalled of the single's performance, "Unfortunately, we didn't go on 'Top of the Pops' because they decided to have S*M*A*S*H on instead. That was disappointing, but still the movement was up." The B-sides to the French single—acoustic versions of "Joyriders", "Dogs are Everywhere" and "Razzmatazz"—were later released in the UK as the B-sides of CD2 of "Common People". On 7 October 1996, a special 7-inch vinyl single coloured brown was issued in the UK.

== Reception ==
"Do You Remember the First Time?" has seen critical acclaim and has been labelled by many writers as one of Pulp's best songs. Spin called the song one of the band's best songs, while Drowned in Sound called the song "the most gorgeously spiteful kiss-off ever put down on record." In an otherwise critical review of His 'n' Hers, Matt Messbarger of the Chicago Tribune noted that "the crooning of Jarvis Cocker about lost youth has its campy charms" on the track.

NME readers ranked the song as Pulp's fourth best in a fan vote, calling it "a giddy anthem for those who didn't feel they had a voice" and concluding, "Who better to articulate the horror of a bad sexual encounter than Mr. Cocker?" Stereogum's Ryan Leas ranked it as the band's fifth best, while Orange County Weekly named the song as the number three Pulp song for beginners.

== Music video ==
To promote the release of the track, lead singer Jarvis Cocker asked fans to recount stories of their own "first time" sexual experiences. Cocker explained of the video's concept, "People imagine that celebrities have this idealised life. Again, it's the thing about sex being shown in this idealised light and really you should do it on a beach at sunset and violins are going to be playing. And somehow, if you do it in the back of a Ford Cortina then you've not done it properly. These famous people, all their introductions were as fumbling and untidy as anyone else's."

A short film was produced by Cocker and Steve Mackey, featuring loss of virginity stories from celebrities including Justine Frischmann, Jo Brand and John Peel; Cocker later called Peel "one of the nicest people I've ever met." This was made available on the Sorted for Films & Vids video, and later the Pulp Hits DVD. Cocker recalled of the video, "I thought maybe people might try and make a joke out of it and not answer very honestly. But everybody answered very honestly indeed. I kind of knew these people vaguely before, but not properly so it's a good way of getting to know somebody by talking about that kind of subject."

The band had also asked Stephen Fry to appear, but were rejected. Cocker stated, "We got told by his agent really gruffly, 'He does NOT talk about his private life!' Oh, okay, you know."

== Track listings ==
All songs were written and composed by Jarvis Cocker, Russell Senior, Steve Mackey, Nick Banks and Candida Doyle; except where noted.

- 7-inch and cassette single
1. "Do You Remember the First Time?" – 4:23
2. "Street Lites" – 5:55
- 12-inch and CD single
1. "Do You Remember the First Time?" – 4:23
2. "Street Lites" – 5:55
3. "The Babysitter" – 4:58
- Limited edition French CD single
1. "Do You Remember the First Time?" – 4:23
2. "Razzmatazz" (acoustic version) – 4:05
3. "Joyriders" (acoustic version) – 3:31
4. "Dogs Are Everywhere" (acoustic version) (Jarvis Cocker, Russell Senior, Candida Doyle, Magnus Doyle, Peter Mansell) – 3:05

== Personnel ==
- Jarvis Cocker – vocals, guitars, piano
- Russell Senior – guitars
- Candida Doyle – synthesizers, organ
- Steve Mackey – bass guitar
- Nick Banks – drums

== Charts ==
| Chart (1994) | Peak position |
|---|---|
| UK Singles (OCC) | 33 |
| UK Airplay (Music Week) | 24 |

== Certifications ==
| Region | Certification | Certified units/sales |
|---|---|---|
| United Kingdom (BPI) | Silver | 200,000^{‡} |
^{‡} Sales+streaming figures based on certification alone.

== Cover versions ==
"Do You Remember the First Time?" was covered by British singer-songwriter Sophie Ellis-Bextor for a BBC Radio 2 evening session to celebrate 20 years of Britpop. The song was performed and recorded at the Maida Vale Studios on 10 April 2014 and later released in her Songs from the Kitchen Disco compilation in 2020.
