= Different Class =

Studio album by Pulp
- Released: 30 October 1995
- Recorded: 18 January – 28 July 1995
- Studios: Townhouse, London
- Genres: Britpop; art rock; pop
- Length: 52:50
- Label: Island
- Producer: Chris Thomas

Pulp chronology
Masters of the Universe (1994)	Different Class (1995)	Countdown 1992–1983 (1996)

Pulp studio album chronology
His 'n' Hers (1994)	Different Class (1995)	This Is Hardcore (1998)

Singles from Different Class
- 1. "Common People" Released: 22 May 1995; 2. "Mis-Shapes" / "Sorted for E's & Wizz" Released: 25 September 1995; 3. "Disco 2000" Released: 27 November 1995; 4. "Something Changed" Released: 25 March 1996

Different Class is the fifth studio album by English rock band Pulp, released on 30 October 1995 by Island Records.

The album was a critical and commercial success, entering the UK Albums Chart at number one and winning the 1996 Mercury Music Prize. It included four top-ten singles in the UK, "Common People", "Sorted for E's & Wizz", "Disco 2000" and "Something Changed". Different Class has been certified four times platinum by the British Phonographic Industry (BPI), and had sold 1.33 million copies in the United Kingdom as of 2020. Widely acclaimed as among the greatest albums of the Britpop era, in 2013, NME ranked the album at number six in its list of the 500 Greatest Albums of All Time while Rolling Stone ranked it number 162 in their 2020 revised version of the 500 Greatest Albums of All Time.

== Background and release ==
The album was released in the UK at the height of Britpop. It followed from the success of their breakthrough album His 'n' Hers the previous year. Two of the singles on the album – "Common People" (which reached number two on the UK Singles Chart) and "Disco 2000" (which reached number seven) – were especially notable, and helped propel Pulp to nationwide fame. A "deluxe edition" of Different Class was released on 11 September 2006. It contains a second disc of B-sides, demos and rarities.

The inspiration for the title came to frontman Jarvis Cocker in Smashing, a club night that ran during the early 1990s in Eve's Club on Regent Street in London. Cocker had a friend who used the phrase "different class" to describe something that was "in a class of its own". Cocker liked the double meaning, with its allusions to the British social class system, which was a theme of some of the songs on the album. A message on the back of the record also references this idea:

"We don't want no trouble, we just want the right to be different. That's all."

== Artwork ==
The sleeve design was created by Blue Source. Initial copies of the CD and vinyl album came with six double-sided inserts of alternative cover art, depicting cardboard cutouts of the band photographed in various situations. A sticker invited the listener to "Choose your own front cover". In all standard copies thereafter these 12 individual covers made up the CD booklet, with the wedding photograph used as the actual cover.

In an interview with BBC Radio 6 Music presenter Chris Hawkins on 8 April 2014, Dom O'Connor, the groom featured in the wedding photograph cover art, recalled how the album cover had come about:

"When we got married we were putting the wedding together ourselves, we pulled a lot of favours from people we knew ... My little brother Ben went to art college in Edinburgh and he made friends with a guy who subsequently became a photographer and had done a lot of work with the Britpop bands – I think he worked with Blur, and Elastica, and of course Pulp. So we asked him about a couple of months before whether he would be prepared to do some photos for us, and he couldn't actually do it because he said he was busy working on some Pulp stuff. But he phoned us about a week before and said Pulp were thinking about using some photos with real people in them, including a wedding photo, and if we would do some joke shots where he'd bring some life-size cutouts of the band down, he would do some proper wedding shots for us as well. And that's basically what happened. They rocked up on the wedding day with the life-size cutouts of the band and took the photos, and I suppose the rest is history."

Apart from the bride and groom, the photograph features the parents of both the bride and the groom, O'Connor's two brothers, his two best friends and his wife's best friend. O'Connor also told Hawkins that he and his family had no further contact with the photographer after the day of the wedding, and had no idea that the photographs would be used for the album cover until his mother saw a poster advertising the album in an HMV record store. He later saw a billboard poster of the album cover while he was out shopping. Pulp's record company at the time did not pay the family for the use of their picture, but when Pulp reformed in 2011 Rough Trade paid for the family members to see Pulp play live. O'Connor said, "Rough Trade very kindly sent us a signed copy of the photo that Jarvis had signed last year, just saying 'Thank you very much Dom and Sharon for letting us crash your wedding', which I thought was a really nice touch actually".

== Critical reception ==
Professional ratings
Initial reviews (in 1995/1996)
Review scores
Source	Rating
Chicago Tribune	3.5/4 stars
Los Angeles Times	3/4 stars
NME	8/10
Q	4/5 stars
Rolling Stone	4/5 stars
Select	5/5 medals
Smash Hits	5/5 stars
Spin	9/10
The Village Voice	A−

Professional ratings
Retrospective reviews (after 1995/1996)
Review scores
Source	Rating
AllMusic	5/5 stars
The Guardian	5/5 stars
Pitchfork	9.3/10

Different Class received widespread acclaim from music critics in the UK. In the NME John Mulvey summarised the record as "funny, phenomenally nasty, genuinely subversive, and, of course, hugely, flamingly POP!... Different Class is a deft, atmospheric, occasionally stealthy and frequently booming, confident record." Melody Maker awarded the album its star rating of "bloody essential", and its critic Simon Reynolds observed that "the album's title alone announces that Cocker's broadened his scope, has another axe to grind: social antagonism", and stated that Pulp was "not so much the jewel in Britpop's crown, more like the single solitary band who validate the whole sorry enterprise". In Q Robert Yates felt that "the range of Different Class is impressive: tracks such as ["Live Bed Show" and "F.E.E.L.I.N.G.C.A.L.L.E.D.L.O.V.E."] render more redundant than ever the view of Pulp as kitsch", while in Vox Keith Cameron awarded the album eight out of ten and wrote that "no other Pulp album of recent years froths around the mouth so unselfconsciously... Pulp have managed to elevate their grandiose, popoid vision-thing to new and greater heights, without crashing into the realms of extreme fantasy." In Mojo Bob Stanley stated, "You'd have to be a fool or a low-fi obsessive not to concede that it's easily the closest that Pulp have come to realising their potential... Different Class is curiously sparse yet lush enough in all the right places, warm and soulful where unnecessary electro-clutter used to be", and concluded, "Arguments about Blur versus Oasis are irrelevant. Pulp are in a different class." Select ranked the album at number one in its end-of-year list of the 50 best albums of 1995.

Different Class was released in the US on 27 February 1996, and received equally enthusiastic reviews from American critics. David Fricke of Rolling Stone called it "a brilliant, eccentric, irresistible pop album about fucking and fucking up... The record is rife with sexual combat and bitter recrimination." He concluded, "Even in a truly classless society, sex separates the men from the boys, the women from the girls, the romantics from the mere runters. Different Class is the sound of Jarvis Cocker keeping score – with delicious accuracy." Robert Christgau wrote in The Village Voice that "1996 won't produce a more indispensable song than "Common People", and described the album as neither Blur nor Oasis, but "Culture Club with lyrics... Smart and glam, swish and het, its jangle subsumed beneath swelling crescendos or nagging keybs and its rhythms steeped in rave". In Spin Barry Walters described the album as "songs about naughty infidelities, sexless marriages, grown-up teenage crushes, twisted revenge fantasies, obsessive voyeurism and useless raves; songs that demand your full attention and deserve it".

=== Legacy ===
In a retrospective review, Stephen Thomas Erlewine of AllMusic declared that Different Class "blows away all their previous albums, including the fine His 'n' Hers. Pulp don't stray from their signature formula at all – it's still grandly theatrical, synth-spiked pop with new wave and disco flourishes, but they have mastered it here. Not only are the melodies and hooks significantly catchier and more immediate, the music explores more territory ... Jarvis Cocker's lyrics take two themes, sex and social class, and explore a number of different avenues in bitingly clever ways. As well as perfectly capturing the behavior of his characters, Cocker grasps the nuances of language, creating a dense portrait of suburban and working-class life." Writing about the album in 2011, BBC Music stated that "over 15 years since its release [it] continues to reward the listener with some of the smartest, slinkiest, sauciest, spectacular pop songs of a decade that was, looking back, not that brilliant once the bucket hats and ironic anoraks are whipped away."

PopMatters' retrospective review in 2004 opined that "nearly nine years after its release, Different Class has aged very well, possessing that timeless quality that is present in all classic albums, but is still obviously a product of its time, a snapshot of mid-'90s life in the UK. Along with Blur's Parklife, it remains the high point of the Britpop era; music, lyrics, production, artwork, it's as perfect as it gets." Reviewing the 2006 deluxe edition, Garry Mulholland of Q stated that the album "defined the mood of the day", while Drowned in Sound described Different Class as "easily the best album of its year of release and arguably the best album from the Britpop era" and went on to call it "a certifiable masterpiece that not only lived up to the sky-high expectations heaped upon it with appalling ease, but surpassed them."

=== Accolades ===
The album was the winner of the 1996 Mercury Music Prize. In 1997, it was ranked at number 34 out of 100 in a "Music of the Millennium" poll conducted by HMV, Channel 4, The Guardian and Classic FM. In 1998 Q readers voted Different Class the 37th greatest album of all time; a repeat poll in 2006 put it at number 85. In 2000 the same magazine placed it at number 46 in its list of the 100 Greatest British Albums Ever. In 2005 it was voted number 70 in Channel 4's The 100 Greatest Albums. In 2006 British Hit Singles & Albums and NME organised a poll in which 40,000 people worldwide voted for the 100 best albums ever and Different Class was placed at number 54 on the list. The album was ranked at number 35 on Spin's "The 300 Best Albums of the Past 30 Years (1985–2014)" list.

Released in 1995 at the height of the Britpop era, it has featured at the number one position on several best Britpop albums polls, including The Village Voice, BuzzFeed, Pitchfork, Spin. Exactly twenty years on from its release, Complex magazine declared Different Class as "the most important Britpop album." Having not featured in Rolling Stone's 2003 list of the 500 Greatest Albums of All Time, the album was ranked at number 162 in their revised 2020 list. The album was also included in the book 1001 Albums You Must Hear Before You Die.

== Commercial performance ==
By September 1996, worldwide sales were estimated at 1.5 million copies by the record label, including 40,000 copies in the US. The album has been certified quadruple platinum in the UK, and as of September 2020 has accrued physical, digital, and streaming equivalent sales of 1.33 million, one-tenth of which were in its first week of sales. By the end of its second week, the album had been certified platinum in the UK with 300,000 copies sold.

== Track listing ==
All lyrics are written by Jarvis Cocker; all music is composed by Pulp (Cocker, Nick Banks, Steve Mackey, Russell Senior, Candida Doyle and Mark Webber), except "Common People" and "Underwear" by Cocker, Banks, Mackey, Senior and Doyle.

No.	Title	Length
1.	"Mis-Shapes"	3:46
2.	"Pencil Skirt"	3:11
3.	"Common People"	5:50
4.	"I Spy"	5:55
5.	"Disco 2000"	4:33
6.	"Live Bed Show"	3:29
7.	"Something Changed"	3:18
8.	"Sorted for E's & Wizz"	3:47
9.	"F.E.E.L.I.N.G.C.A.L.L.E.D.L.O.V.E"	6:01
10.	"Underwear"	4:06
11.	"Monday Morning"	4:16
12.	"Bar Italia"	3:42
Total length:		52:50

Japanese edition (bonus tracks)
No.	Title	Origin	Length
13.	"P.T.A. (Parent Teacher Association)"	"Mis-Shapes" / "Sorted for E's & Wizz" single	3:16
14.	"Common People" (Motiv8 club mix)	"Common People" single	7:51

Japanese edition (Second Class bonus disc)
No.	Title	Origin	Length
1.	"Mile End"	"Something Changed" single	4:32
2.	"Ansaphone"	"Disco 2000" single	4:00
3.	"Live Bed Show" (extended)	"Disco 2000" single	4:10
4.	"Your Sister's Clothes"	The Sisters EP	4:37
5.	"Seconds"	The Sisters EP	4:19
6.	"Deep Fried in Kelvin"	"Lipgloss" single	9:49
7.	"The Babysitter"	"Do You Remember the First Time?" single	5:01
8.	"Street Lites"	"Do You Remember the First Time?" single	5:55
9.	"Common People '96" (7" edit)	"Common People" single	4:07

German edition (Second Class bonus disc)
No.	Title	Origin	Length
1.	"Mile End"	"Something Changed" single	4:32
2.	"Ansaphone"	"Disco 2000" single	4:00
3.	"P.T.A. (Parent Teacher Association)"	"Mis-Shapes" / "Sorted for E's & Wizz" single	3:16
4.	"Live Bed Show" (extended)	"Disco 2000" single	4:10
5.	"Your Sister's Clothes"	The Sisters EP	4:37
6.	"Seconds"	The Sisters EP	4:19
7.	"Deep Fried in Kelvin"	"Lipgloss" single	9:49
8.	"The Babysitter"	"Do You Remember the First Time?" single	5:01
9.	"Street Lites"	"Do You Remember the First Time?" single	5:55

2006 deluxe edition (bonus disc)
No.	Title	Origin	Length
1.	"Common People" (at Glastonbury 1995)	"Mis-Shapes" / "Sorted for E's & Wizz" single	7:38
2.	"Mile End"	"Something Changed" single	4:30
3.	"P.T.A."	"Mis-Shapes" / "Sorted for E's & Wizz" single	3:17
4.	"Ansaphone" (demo)	Previously unavailable	4:09
5.	"Paula" (demo)	Previously unavailable	3:37
6.	"Catcliffe Shakedown" (demo)	Previously unavailable	6:43
7.	"We Can Dance Again" (demo)	Previously unavailable	3:51
8.	"Don't Lose It" (demo)	Previously unavailable	3:10
9.	"Whiskey in the Jar"	Childline	4:48
10.	"Disco 2000" (Nick Cave pub rock version)	Previously unavailable	4:22
11.	"Common People" (Vocoda mix)	"Common People" single	6:18

== Personnel ==
Pulp

- Jarvis Cocker – vocals, Vox Marauder guitar, Ovation 12 string guitar, Sigma acoustic guitar, Roland VP-330, Roland SH-09, Mellotron, Micromoog, Synare
- Russell Senior – Fender Jazzmaster guitar, violin
- Candida Doyle – Farfisa Compact Professional II organ, Ensoniq ASR-10, Korg Trident II, Minimoog, Fender Rhodes piano, Roland Juno 6, Roland SH-09
- Steve Mackey – Musicman Sabre bass
- Mark Webber – Gibson ES 345, Gibson Les Paul guitar, Gibson Firebird guitar, Sigma acoustic guitar, Casio Tonebank CT-470, Fender Rhodes piano, Roland Juno 6
- Nick Banks – Yamaha drums, Zildjian cymbals, percussion

Additional personnel

- Chris Thomas – production, additional guitar and keyboards
- David "Chipper" Nicholas – engineering
- Julie Gardner – engineering assistance (except tracks 3 and 10)
- Pete Lewis – engineering assistance (tracks 3 and 10), additional engineering
- Matthew Vaughan – programming (except tracks 3 and 10)
- Olle Romo – programming (tracks 3 and 10), additional programming
- Antony Genn – additional programming
- Mark Haley – additional programming
- Anne Dudley – orchestral arrangement and conducting (tracks 4, 7 and 9)
- Gavyn Wright – orchestra leader
- Andy Strange – orchestra recording assistance
- Kevin Metcalfe – mastering
- Geoff Pesche – mastering
- Donald Milne – photography
- Rankin – photography

== Charts ==
Chart (1995–1996)	Peak position
Australian Albums (ARIA)	44
Austrian Albums (Ö3 Austria)	24
Belgian Albums (Ultratop Wallonia)	47
Canada Top Albums/CDs (RPM)	36
Danish Albums (Hitlisten)	22
Dutch Albums (Album Top 100)	69
Estonian Albums (Eesti Top 10)	5
European Albums Chart	11
Finnish Albums (Suomen virallinen lista)	37
German Albums (Offizielle Top 100)	71
Icelandic Albums (Tonlist)	9
Irish Albums (IRMA)	9
Japanese Albums (Oricon)	91
New Zealand Albums (RMNZ)	17
Norwegian Albums (VG-lista)	19
Scottish Albums (Official Charts)	1
Swedish Albums (Sverigetopplistan)	7
UK Albums (Official Charts)	1
US Heatseekers Albums (Billboard)	34

Chart (2025–2026)	Peak position
German Rock & Metal Albums (Offizielle Top 100)	10
Greek Albums (IFPI)	29

== Certifications ==
Region	Certification	Certified units/sales
United Kingdom (BPI)	4× Platinum	1,330,000
Summaries
Europe (IFPI)	Platinum	1,000,000^{*}
^{*} Sales figures based on certification alone.
