= Intro – The Gift Recordings =

Compilation album by Pulp
- Released: 4 October 1993
- Recorded: 1992–1993
- Genres: Britpop, indie rock
- Length: 40:12
- Label: Island
- Producers: Simon Hinkler; Mike Timm; Pulp; Ed Buller

Pulp chronology
Separations (1992)	Intro – The Gift Recordings (1993)	His 'n' Hers (1994)

Professional ratings
Review scores
Source	Rating
Allmusic	4.5/5 stars

Intro – The Gift Recordings is a compilation album by Pulp. It contains the band's three singles recorded for Gift and was released in October 1993. The version of "Babies" included here is the original single mix released in 1992, slightly different from the 1994 version available on the album His 'n' Hers. "Sheffield: Sex City" features a spoken vocal contribution from keyboardist Candida Doyle reciting a selection from the book My Secret Garden by Nancy Friday.

== Track listing ==
All music written by Pulp, all lyrics written by Jarvis Cocker (except where noted).

1. "Space" – 5:11
2. "O.U. (12" Mix)" – 3:43
3. "Babies" – 4:04
4. "Styloroc (Nites of Suburbia)" – 3:10
5. "Razzmatazz" – 3:40
6. "Sheffield: Sex City" – 8:31 (opening spoken passage taken from My Secret Garden by Nancy Friday)

Inside Susan – A Story in 3 Parts

7. "Stacks" – 2:42
8. "Inside Susan" – 5:34
9. "59 Lyndhurst Grove" – 3:33

== Personnel ==
- Jarvis Cocker – vocals, guitar
- Russell Senior – guitar, violin
- Candida Doyle – organ, synthesizer, stylophone, vocals
- Steve Mackey – bass guitar
- Nick Banks – drums

== Charts ==
Chart performance for Intro – The Gift Recordings
Chart (2024)	Peak position
Scottish Albums (Official Charts)	34
