= Disco 2000 (song) =

1995 single by Pulp

- Vinyl single, CD single (part one)

Single by Pulp

from the album Different Class
- B-side: "Ansaphone"
- Released: 27 November 1995
- Genre: Britpop
- Length: 4:33 (album version); 4:51 (7-inch mix)
- Label: Island
- Songwriters: Jarvis Cocker; Nick Banks; Steve Mackey; Russell Senior; Candida Doyle; Mark Webber
- Producers: Chris Thomas (album version); Alan Tarney (single, 7-inch remix)

Pulp singles chronology
"Mis-Shapes" / "Sorted for E's & Wizz" (1995)	"Disco 2000" (1995)	"Something Changed" (1996)

Music video
- "Disco 2000" on YouTube

Alternative cover
- CD single (part two)

"Disco 2000" is a song by British band Pulp, included on the band's fifth album, Different Class (1995). Featuring a disco-inspired musical performance, the song was based on Pulp singer Jarvis Cocker's childhood memories of his friend Deborah Bone, whom he had fancied in his youth but could never impress.

"Disco 2000" was released as a single on 27 November 1995 by Island Records, the third from Different Class. The single reached number seven in the UK and charted in several others. The release was accompanied by a music video directed by Pedro Romhanyi, which was based on the story told on the single's sleeve artwork. The song has since become one of Pulp's most famous tracks and has seen critical acclaim.

== Background and lyrics ==
"Disco 2000" tells the story of a narrator falling for a childhood friend called Deborah, who is more popular than he is and wondering what it would be like to meet again when they are older. Pulp frontman Jarvis Cocker based the lyrics on a girl he knew as a child and recalled, "the only bit that isn't true is the woodchip wallpaper." He elaborated:

There was a girl called Deborah—she was born in the same hospital as me. Not within an hour—I think it was like three hours—but you can't fit three hours into the song without having to really rush the singing! ... But basically you know the whole thing was the same—I fancied her for ages and then she started to become a woman and her breasts began to sprout so then all the boys fancied her then. I didn't stand a 'cat-in-hell's chance'. But then I did use to sometimes hang around outside her house and stuff like that.

Deborah was based on a real-life childhood friend of Cocker's, Deborah Bone, who moved away from Sheffield to Letchworth when she was 10. As the lyrics suggest, she did marry and have children. Bone later reflected, "My claim to fame is growing up and sleeping with Jarvis Cocker, well someone had to do it, and it was all perfectly innocent! I have been told and like to believe that I am the Deborah in the Number 1 hit 'Disco 2000,' but we never did get to meet up by the fountain down the road." The fountain referred to as the meeting place was Goodwin Fountain, formerly located on Fargate, in Sheffield city centre.

== Music ==
"Disco 2000" took inspiration from disco music. Martin Aston of Attitude described the song as "seventies à go-go: the stamp of Elton John's 'Saturday Night's Alright For Fighting', Marc Bolan's glittery guitar, ABBA's sweeping gait and a huge swipe from Laura Branigan's Hi-NRG epic 'Gloria'." Drummer Nick Banks said of this influence, "We are very much influenced by disco, yeah. And of course in the late '80s we got into raves a bit, and music did take on more of a disco thump in places. Yeah, I'm always going down the disco, I love it."

== Release ==
"Disco 2000" was released as the third single from Different Class on 27 November 1995. The single reached number seven on the UK Singles Chart, becoming the third top-10 single from Different Class, following "Common People" and the double A-side "Mis-Shapes" / "Sorted for E's & Wizz", both of which reached number two. The song also charted highly in Austria, Finland, Hungary, Iceland and Ireland, and it became Pulp's only top-50 hit in Australia. On 7 October 1996, an orange 7-inch vinyl single was released in the United Kingdom.

Due to its millennial subject matter, Pulp removed the song's synchronisation licence, effectively banning the song from being used in TV and radio trailers throughout 1999 and 2000.

== Reception ==
"Disco 2000" has seen critical acclaim and has been labeled by many as one of Pulp's greatest songs. Stephen Thomas Erlewine of AllMusic praised its "glitzy, gaudy stomp." James Masterton for Dotmusic said it "is easily the best track from the Different Class album, the closest they have ever come to an out-and-out pop stormer and certainly a floor-filler at office parties this holiday with its chorus of 'Let's all meet up in the year 2000/Won't it be strange when we're all fully grown?'" A reviewer from Music Week rated it three out of five, adding, "A bouncing disco beat, based on the riff from Laura Branigan's 'Gloria,' sees a pumped-up Pulp and Jarvis doing his usual talking bit. But it may disappoint fans of their recent epics." Simon Price from Melody Maker named it Single of the Week, writing, "But 'Disco 2000', like 'Pink Glove' before it, shows that what fuels his vindictive bitterness is actually a deep romanticism. Like The Human League's 'Louise' or Hot Chocolate's 'It Started with a Kiss', 'Disco 2000' — the second best track on Different Class after 'F.E.E.L.I.N.G.S Called Love' — is Jarvis' fantasy of meeting an old flame and reversing time (romanticism, remember, is equal parts dreaming of what could be, and what could have been)."

Ben Willmott from NME said it "is probably not their finest moment of late but it's typical on-form Pulp with an achingly gooey chorus and sexual frustration by the lorryload. Which is good enough for most of us." Adrien Begrand of PopMatters called it a "fabulous single". David Fricke of Rolling Stone wrote, "As a singer and writer, Cocker specializes in hapless pining and geeky self-obsession, desperately holding on to a childhood crush in 'Disco 2000'." Gina Morris from Smash Hits gave it a full score of five out of five and also named it Best New Single, adding, "In this latest gripping Pulp episode, Mr Cocker looks back, once again, on the grubby sexual fantasies of his hopeless youth — a girl he always fancied at school." Barry Walters of Spin wrote, "This band has quoted disco riffs before, but the way it alludes here to Laura Branigan's 'Gloria' approaches genius."

NME readers ranked the song as Pulp's third best in a fan vote, while Orange County Weekly named the song as the number one Pulp song for beginners. Stereogum's Ryan Leas ranked it as the band's second best, calling it "one of the ultimate Pulp songs" and concluding, "It's about youth and romanticism, but filtered through the perspective of a man already in his early 30s. That's what makes it a classic pop single by Pulp."

In a 1996 interview, Elvis Costello praised the lyricism in the song, stating, "He's [Jarvis] very smart and I like his songs. I love the detail, like the thing in 'Disco 2000': 'There was woodchip on the wall.' I get the feeling that was a real memory."

== Music video ==
Pedro Romhanyi directed the music video for "Disco 2000". He adapted the story portrayed on the cover sleeve of the single, designed by Donald Milne. A boy and a girl, played by models Patrick Skinny and Jo Skinny, respectively, meet at a Saturday night disco and hook up. The video uses the 7-inch mix of the song. The members of Pulp are represented on cardboard cutouts and on televisions throughout (for this reason, drummer Nick Banks called the song "the easiest video [they] ever did"). Romhanyi explains:

So, in the video we duplicate the photo shoot, changing the order in a couple of cases, and of course add a lot of new stuff - the track is over five minutes long. Donald Milne's work for the album and single is like an artificial version of the real world, where all its mundane features have been removed. So this is what we had to recreate - the Pulp world - without Pulp being in it. The idea for the cutouts came from an old copy of Nova owned by [bassist] Steve Mackey. Jarvis and Steve like things quite crafted and with a sense of structure. A lot of work and a lot of talk that goes on before a frame is shot.

== Track listings ==
All lyrics are written by Jarvis Cocker; all music is composed by Jarvis Cocker, Nick Banks, Steve Mackey, Russell Senior, Candida Doyle and Mark Webber.

UK and Australian CD1; Japanese CD single
No.	Title	Length
1.	"Disco 2000" (7-inch mix)	4:51
2.	"Disco 2000" (album mix)	4:33
3.	"Ansaphone"	4:01
4.	"Live Bed Show" (extended)	4:10

UK and Australian CD2
No.	Title	Length
1.	"Disco 2000" (album mix)	4:33
2.	"Disco 2000" (7-inch mix)	4:51
3.	"Disco 2000" (Motiv 8 Discoid mix)	7:31
4.	"Disco 2000" (Motiv 8 Gimp dub)	6:31

UK 7-inch single
No.	Title	Length
1.	"Disco 2000" (album mix)	4:33
2.	"Ansaphone"	4:01

- The liner notes mislabel the album mix of "Disco 2000" as the 7-inch mix.

UK and Australian cassette single; European CD single
No.	Title	Length
1.	"Disco 2000" (7-inch mix)	4:51
2.	"Disco 2000" (Motiv 8 Discoid mix)	7:31

UK 12-inch single
No.	Title	Length
1.	"Disco 2000" (7-inch mix)	4:51
2.	"Ansaphone"	4:01
3.	"Disco 2000" (Motiv 8 Gimp dub)	6:31
4.	"Disco 2000" (Motiv 8 Discoid mix)	7:31

== Musicians ==
- Jarvis Cocker: Singer
- Russell Senior: Guitar
- Mark Webber: Guitar
- Candida Doyle: Keyboards
- Steve Mackey: Bass guitar
- Nick Banks: Drums

== Charts ==
=== Weekly charts ===
Chart (1995–1996)	Peak position
Australia (ARIA)	35
Austria (Ö3 Austria Top 40)	14
Croatia (Radio Sjeverozapad)	21
Denmark (Tracklisten)	9
Europe (Eurochart Hot 100)	29
Europe (European Hit Radio)	15
Finland (Suomen virallinen lista)	9
Germany (GfK)	47
Hungary (Mahasz)	8
Iceland (Íslenski Listinn Topp 40)	2
Ireland (IRMA)	13
Israel (IBA)	24
Scottish Singles Sales (Official Charts)	8
Sweden (Sverigetopplistan)	41
UK Singles (Official Charts)	7
UK Club Chart (Music Week)	34

=== Year-end charts ===
Chart (1995)	Position
Latvia (Latvijas Top 50)	161
UK Singles (OCC)	72

Chart (1996)	Position
Iceland (Íslenski Listinn Topp 40)	52
UK Airplay (Music Week)	9

== Certifications ==
Region	Certification	Certified units/sales
United Kingdom (BPI)	Platinum	600,000^{‡}
^{‡} Sales+streaming figures based on certification alone.

== Cover versions ==
Irish singer Joe Dolan covered the song for his album Joe's 90s in 1998. Following his death, the RTÉ Concert Orchestra added a string accompaniment to a number of his recordings. They were released on the albums Orchestrated and Orchestrated, Vol. 2. A version of the song appears on the latter album.

The song was covered by Nick Cave as a B-side for Pulp's single "Bad Cover Version" (2002), and again as a "pub rock" version on the deluxe edition of Different Class (2006). Keane covered the song in 2008.

== In popular culture ==
"Disco 2000" was featured in episode 7 of the first series of Life on Mars, where DI Sam Tyler hears it come on the radio in 1973, and mentions to DCI Gene Hunt that he had seen Pulp play the Manchester Nynex in 1996, to Hunt's bemusement. The song also appeared in a party scene in the 2013 Seth Rogen film This Is the End, and again in "The End of the Tour" in 2015.

In 1996, it featured on the UEFA Euro 1996 official album, The Beautiful Game.

The budget airline EasyJet used the song in a 2015 UK commercial celebrating their twenty years of revenue service.

The song is featured on the soundtrack of the 2018 independent adventure game KURSK, and can be heard on the radio at multiple points.
