= Razzmatazz (song) =

Single by Pulp
- B-side: "Stacks"; "Inside Susan"; "59 Lyndhurst Grove"
- Released: 15 February 1993 (U.K.)
- Recorded: Razzmatazz: October 1992, Maison Rouge Studios, London; Inside Susan – A Story in 3 Parts: December 1992, Protocol Studios, London
- Genre: Indie rock, Britpop
- Label: Gift
- Songwriter: Jarvis Cocker/Pulp
- Producer: Pulp

Pulp singles chronology
"Babies" (1992)	"Razzmatazz" (1993)	"Lipgloss" (1993)

"Razzmatazz" is a song written and released by the British rock group Pulp. Featuring lyrics written by Pulp frontman Jarvis Cocker about an ex-girlfriend, the song sees the narrator mock his ex-girlfriend for leading a dull life after dumping him.

"Razzmatazz" was the band's final single for Gift Records, charting at number 80 in the UK. The single was released independently of an album, although it appeared as a bonus track at the end of the US version of His 'n' Hers. Since its release, the song has seen positive critical reception and has appeared on multiple compilation albums.

== Background ==
The lyrics to "Razzmatazz" were written by Jarvis Cocker about a former girlfriend. Cocker explained, "Yeah, I did have a girlfriend when I was at college who I wrote this song, 'Razzmatazz,' about. And then I was kind of embarrassed, I bumped into her a few years later and she twigged that it was about her and it wasn't very complementary [sic]. Actually, we ended up laughing about it; it was all right."

When asked about the song's lyrics, Cocker stated, "I don't think they're seedy. They're just true to life. I think they're deadpan and down to earth. I don't think they're strange. Razzmatazz is a bit sad." Cocker explained in Melody Maker, "It's the most bitter song we've ever done, but however harsh I am about the people in 'Razzmatazz', I'm not writing from above their level. I've got a lot of experience of being as sad as them, if not more so."

Cocker was critical of the song's original production, stating, "I had some problems with the initial mix—it sounded a little A Flock of Seagulls-like, so we remixed it with Phil Vinall early in '93."

== Lyrics and music ==
According to The National, the song features "a wry, bitter take on intimacy." In "Razzmatazz," the narrator is depicted as having been dumped by a girlfriend who demanded a more glamorous lifestyle, only to relish in how his ex-girlfriend has let herself go and is living a dull life. Notable for its bitter, witty lyrics, the song features the narrator mocking his ex-girlfriend for "getting fatter" after their relationship, for leaving parties alone, and for "going with some kid who looks like some bad comedian."

"Razzmatazz" features what The Guardian described as a "dark disco-charged melody, flavoured impeccably by Cocker's witty, withering vinegar." Stereogum noted that the song has a "gloss that pointed towards the more thorough production standards of the following year's His 'n' Hers."

== Release ==
"Razzmatazz" was released as the third and final single by the band on their new label, Gift Records. The B-side of the single was the suite of songs Inside Susan – A Story in 3 Parts; Cocker explained, "You follow this character from early adolescence through to early thirties and married to an architect somewhere in South London. The last part, "59 Lyndhurst Grove", was inspired by a party I'd been to the weekend before." Upon its release, the song was named the Melody Maker single of the week. In the UK, the single charted at number 80, the highest singles chart position for the band up to that point.

After its single release, the song was included as the final track on the American release of His 'n' Hers. It has also appeared on the compilations Intro – The Gift Recordings and Hits. A music video for the song was also released to promote the song.

== Reception ==
"Razzmatazz" has seen critical acclaim and has been labelled by many writers as one of Pulp's best songs. Brad Sanders of Stereogum called it "arguably [His 'n' Hers'] very best track." Sarah Dempster of NME called the song a "Formica-topped, sad-eyed, retro-unique delight."

NME readers ranked the song as Pulp's fourth best in a fan vote, writing, "Yes it's angry and bitter, but it was also eloquently angry, and scabrously witty to boot – Jarvis doing his modern day, indie Oscar Wilde thing brilliantly." Stereogum's Ryan Leas ranked it as the band's third best, calling the song "one of their finest achievements" and writing, "While it isn't as sonically rough as what they'd explore later, 'Razzmatazz' has a mean intensity in it not so often seen in their mid '90s work." The Guardian named it as one of Pulp's ten best songs, dubbing it "a supreme pop single with its spinning, dark disco-charged melody, flavoured impeccably by Cocker's witty, withering vinegar." Orange County Weekly named the song as the number nine Pulp song for beginners. "Razzmatazz" has also been voted as the fourth best indie song of all time on 23indie's 'All Time Indie Top 50'.

Comedian Jo Brand praised the song, recounting, "When I first met Jarvis I embarrassed him by saying I thought 'Razzmatazz' was a work of utter genius."

The nightclub Razzmatazz in Barcelona, which opened in 2000, is named after the song.

== Track listing ==
All songs written and composed by Jarvis Cocker, Russell Senior, Steve Mackey, Nick Banks and Candida Doyle.

7" vinyl

1. "Razzmatazz" – 3:39
2. "Inside Susan" – 5:35
3. "59 Lyndhurst Grove" – 3:33

12" vinyl / CD single

1. "Razzmatazz" – 3:39
2. "Stacks" – 2:42
3. "Inside Susan" – 5:35
4. "59 Lyndhurst Grove" – 3:33

== Personnel ==
- Jarvis Cocker – vocals, piano
- Russell Senior – guitars
- Candida Doyle – synthesizers, organ
- Steve Mackey – bass guitar
- Nick Banks – drums

== Sources ==
- Razzamatazz's page on Space
- Razzamatazz single page on PulpWiki
- acrylicafternoons.com
