= Lip gloss (disambiguation) =

Lip gloss is a makeup product used on the lips.

Lip gloss may also refer to:

- "Lip Gloss", a 2007 song by Lil Mama
- "Lipgloss" (song), a 1993 song by Pulp
- Lipgloss (TV series), a Filipino drama
