= Sorted for Films & Vids =

Video by Pulp
- Released: November 1995
- Genre: Britpop
- Length: 61 mins

Sorted for Films & Vids is a compilation of promotional videos by the band Pulp, released on VHS in 1995. The title is a reference to the band's hit single "Sorted for E's & Wizz". All of the videos were later included on the Hits DVD.

== Track listing ==
1. "Babies" (spoken word version)
2. Titles
3. "Babies" (original version)
4. "Razzmatazz"
5. "Lipgloss"
6. "Do You Remember the First Time?"
7. "Babies" (1994 version)
8. "Common People"
9. "Sorted for E's & Wizz"
10. "Mis-Shapes"
11. "Do You Remember the First Time?" (30-minute feature film)

== Sources ==
- AcrylicAfternoons
- "Truth and Beauty : the story of Pulp" by Mark Sturdy (Omnibus Press)
