= Help the Aged (song) =

1997 single by Pulp

Single by Pulp

from the album This Is Hardcore
- Released: 10 November 1997
- Length: 4:28 (album version)
- Label: Island
- Songwriters: Nick Banks; Jarvis Cocker; Candida Doyle; Steve Mackey; Mark Webber
- Producer: Chris Thomas

Pulp singles chronology
"Something Changed" (1996)	"Help the Aged" (1997)	"This Is Hardcore" (1998)

Music video
- "Help the Aged" on YouTube

"Help the Aged" is a song by British alternative rock band Pulp from their sixth album, This Is Hardcore (1998). Written as a sarcastic reflection of Pulp singer Jarvis Cocker's ageing, the song was disliked by Pulp guitarist Russell Senior who left the band before the song's release and sought to prevent it from being released as a single. "Help the Aged" was released as the first single from This Is Hardcore in November 1997, by Island Records, reaching number eight in the UK. The song has since seen positive critical reception, with many critics praising the song's lyrics for their wit and compassion. The accompanying music video was filmed in the Stoke Newington Town Hall in London.

== Background ==
"Help the Aged" was written as a self-deprecating reflection of Cocker's increasing age. Cocker explained at the time, "It tackles personal issues because I'm now 34 years old. And I have been aware of the ageing process for a couple of years now. ... It's not a heartfelt plea to help people cross the road." Cocker summed up the song as "just me whining on about getting old."

The song was one of the first written for This Is Hardcore, alongside "Northern Souls" (which would ultimately appear on the album as "Glory Days"). Pulp guitarist Russell Senior left the band prior to the single's release, citing his dislike for the song as a reason for his departure. He recalled, "'Help the Aged' I didn't like and didn't feel involved with and tried to avoid being released. Jarvis was very keen on it and I guess we had musical differences."

During Da Ali G Show, Jarvis Cocker performed the song, which soon transitioned into a distinctly more urban take on things, added by Ali G, with lines such as "help the motherfuckin' aged".

== Release ==
"Help the Aged" was released as the first single from This Is Hardcore on 10 November 1997. Cocker explained, "That was the oldest song and I was beginning to feel like if we didn't get it out soon, it'd be past its sell-by date."

The single charted at number eight in the UK, becoming the band's fifth consecutive top ten single. Pulp drummer Nick Banks said of the reaction to the single, "I think the general feeling from the critics was kind of 'It's good, but, ooh, it's not "Disco 2000" is it?' ... They didn't quite understand it." Cocker reflected on the single's performance, "I was really pleased when it got to number eight. Maybe we overestimated people's willingness to confront their own mortality in a pop record, but I'm proud that we got a record about getting old and dying into the Top Ten."

B-side "Tomorrow Never Lies" was intended to be used as the theme to the James Bond film Tomorrow Never Dies. The song was ultimately rejected in favour of a song by Sheryl Crow, and was renamed after the film's working title for copyright reasons. The original version of the song, with the name "Tomorrow Never Dies", is featured on the LP version of the album, even though it is listed as "Tomorrow Never Lies". It surfaced on the bonus disc of the This Is Hardcore special edition in 2006.

== Critical reception ==
"Help the Aged" has generally seen positive critical reception. Larry Flick from Billboard magazine commented, "And rest assured that gloriously happy is precisely the emotion you'll be experiencing by the close of this richly textured, deliciously introspective rock ballad. Jarvis Cocker is at his vocally ravaged best here, swimming through an arrangement that gradually builds from a quiet piano/guitar opening into a collision course of clanging guitars, layered harmonies, and pounding beats. No need to handicap the future of this gem. Just prepare for a saturating rock radio run." David Browne of Entertainment Weekly wrote that the song "deftly leaps from an after-hours fragility to arena roar," while Steve Hochman of The Los Angeles Times wrote, "In 'Help the Aged', sentiments that might sound cynical from someone else ('One time they were just like you, drinking, smoking cigs and sniffing glue') are full of compassion and the simple knowledge that we all get older." Rolling Stone's Greg Kot wrote that, in the song, "Pulp reach out to the inevitable with a mixture of resignation, compassion and humor, and package it all in a mirror ball of florid strings, helium-enriched vocal harmonies and shimmering guitars." Nick Hornby of Spin Magazine stated, "By the climax ... the song is breaking your heart in ways you couldn't have anticipated."

Writing for NME, Andy Crysell said that the song was "largely a Pulp-by-numbers effort which sways weightlessly".

== Music video ==
"Help the Aged" was accompanied upon release by a music video produced by Hammer & Tongs filmed in the Stoke Newington Town Hall. The video features Pulp performing in an old folks' home, while young men dressed up to look elderly seduce young women. Cocker recalled,

We decided it'd be better to use young people made up to look old than to use actual old people, as if, for some reason, looking old had become trendy. ... I think the blokes in the video look really good—in fact, I went up to the person who styled the video after, who got the clothes, and ordered a few. They had a nice kind of cardigan with a tie waste on it!

The video also featured Cocker singing while riding a Stannah stairlift up to a space-esque location—Stannah rejected the initial plan of riding the stairlift to Heaven on the grounds that they did not want to be associated with death.

== Track listing ==
All tracks are written by Nick Banks, Jarvis Cocker, Candida Doyle, Steve Mackey and Mark Webber.

CD, 7-inch and cassette (UK)
No.	Title	Length
1.	"Help the Aged"	4:31
2.	"Tomorrow Never Lies"	4:49
3.	"Laughing Boy"	3:49

== Personnel ==
- Jarvis Cocker – vocals
- Mark Webber – guitars
- Candida Doyle – keyboards
- Steve Mackey – bass guitar
- Nick Banks – drums

== Charts ==
Chart (1998)	Peak position
Australia (ARIA)	85
Europe (Eurochart Hot 100)	26
Netherlands (Single Top 100)	100
Scotland Singles (OCC)	12
Sweden (Sverigetopplistan)	56
UK Singles (OCC)	8

== Release history ==
Region	Date	Format(s)	Label(s)	Ref.
United Kingdom	10 November 1997	7-inch vinyl; CD; cassette	Island	
Japan	24 November 1997	CD	Island	
