= Sorted for E's & Wizz =

1995 single by Pulp

Single by Pulp

from the album Different Class
- A-side: "Mis-Shapes"
- Released: 25 September 1995
- Genre: Britpop
- Length: 3:47
- Label: Island
- Songwriter: Pulp
- Producer: Chris Thomas

Pulp singles chronology
"Common People" (1995)	"Mis-Shapes" / "Sorted for E's & Wizz" (1995)	"Disco 2000" (1995)

"Sorted for E's & Wizz" is a song written and performed by the English band Pulp for their 1995 album Different Class. Based lyrically on a phrase overheard at Spike Island (later to be the subject of another Pulp single), the song features lyrics examining the hollow and artificial nature of drug culture. Because of its subject matter, the song sparked controversy in the UK, where several tabloids attacked the song.

"Sorted for E's & Wizz" was released as a double A-side single with "Mis-Shapes" in September 1995, and reached No. 2 in the UK Singles Chart as well as No. 6 in Ireland. It was Pulp's second successive No. 2 UK hit in that year. Since its release, the song has seen critical acclaim.

== Background ==
"Sorted for E's & Wizz" was first performed at the Glastonbury Festival in 1995, where Pulp frontman Jarvis Cocker explained his inspiration. "'Sorted for E's and Wizz' is a phrase a girl that I met in Sheffield once told me...and she went to see The Stone Roses at Spike Island and I said 'what do you remember about it?' And she said: 'Well there were all these blokes walking around saying 'Is everybody sorted for E's and wizz?' And that's all she remembered about it and I thought it was a good phrase." Cocker later said of debuting the song live at Glastonbury, "It just seemed like a totally appropriate place to play it for the first time."

"Sorted for E's & Wizz" was inspired by Cocker's ambivalence toward drugs; he once stated that he does not 'think there's anything big and clever about taking drugs'. Cocker explained,

The whole thing it's trying to say is that no matter how great a time you have on drugs, you know that it's been artificially induced. You've introduced a chemical into your brain and that's what makes it such a hollow experience. ... And of course, there's that other feeling, the idea that however great you're feeling you want to make it that much better. ... You're searching for that illusory thing, where you're always trying to get back to that state, but you know you never will. And you start to see through it, notice how it's a bit frayed at the edges. And that's what that song's about. Drugs aren't a magical thing. Just chemicals that leave you feeling hollow.

In another interview, he said of the song's meaning: "It's neither a condemnation nor a celebration of drugs. It's just a factual look. It's about a time when I went to a lot of warehouse things. It was completely different to going to a Roxy discotheque in the middle of town, people were so friendly. Then, of course, you realised that it was mainly because they'd taken loads of drugs and you became disillusioned with it." Cocker described the song as being about when "one minute, people'd be shaking your hands saying, 'Yeah, all right, geezer, you're my best mate,' and then as soon as the thing had finished and you were trying to thumb a lift off these same people they'd be like, 'Fuck off'!"

The song's lyrical matter inspired drummer Nick Banks' performance on the song; he said, 'I had the mental image that you were walking towards a rave and you could hear the music. It's quite a low level, and your mind can't interpret it right, so it's coming out at quite a different tempo, it appears a bit slower than normal. That's the idea I had in my mind, but whether it's come across, I dunno.'

== Release ==
"Sorted for E's & Wizz" was released as a double-A side single with "Mis-Shapes". Cocker credited producer Chris Thomas for convincing Pulp to release the song as a single; he recalled, 'I thought it would never get played because of the subject matter.' The CD booklet of the single, referencing the song's lyrics, read, 'It didn't mean nothing.'

Pre-release orders reached well over 200,000, even before its release on 25 September (according to Nick Rowe, marketing director for Island Records), the biggest pre-release total in the label's history to that date. By the time it was released, this had increased to 400,000 copies. The high expectations of the single's success prompted bookmaker William Hill to refuse to take bets on the single charting at No. 1. Reviewing the single's other A-side "Mis-Shapes" in the 13 September issue of Smash Hits magazine, Mark Sutherland wrote: 'Unlike "Common People", nothing short of brazen horse-fixing will prevent it [from] reaching Number One.' Although the single had higher first-week sales than "Common People" and was Pulp's closest shot at the No. 1 spot, the single stalled at No. 2, behind Simply Red's "Fairground", which had a lead of more than 20,000 copies.

"Sorted for E's & Wizz" was also released on Pulp's 1995 album Different Class, which itself opened with the tune "Mis-Shapes". Guitarist Mark Webber, who disliked the song and wanted to replace it with "Mile End", later said, 'I didn't want "Sorted" on the album. I think it's a rubbish song.' On its commercial success, Webber said, '"Sorted" sold more than "Common People", but you wouldn't really think so. But it's just nowhere near as good a song.'

== Controversy ==
Before the release of "Sorted for E's & Wizz", the Daily Mirror newspaper printed a front-page story headed 'Ban This Sick Stunt', alongside an article by Kate Thornton that said the song was 'pro-drugs' and thus called for the tune to be banned. The pre-release single had an inlay that Thornton alleged showed buyers how to make an origami 'wrap' or parcel with the intention of 'offering teenage fans a DIY guide on hiding illegal drugs'. In an interview with music paper NME, on the same day, Thornton was quoted as saying: 'We wanted to see the sleeve pulled and we thought it was a crusade we would take up single-handedly. I think the sleeve is something that will concern our readers, although it may not concern yours.'

Pulp agreed to change the artwork, while continuing to assert that Thornton had misinterpreted the meaning of both the sleeve art and the song's lyrics. Lead singer Jarvis Cocker released a statement two days later saying: '..."Sorted..." is not a pro-drugs song...Nowhere on the sleeve does it say you are supposed to put drugs in here but I understand the confusion... I wouldn't want anything we do to encourage people to take drugs because they aren't a solution or an answer to anything. I don't think anyone who listens to "Sorted..." would come away thinking it had a pro-drugs message. If they did I would say they had misinterpreted it.' The Daily Mirror printed his statement, but he was unhappy that the front-page article written by Thornton contained the misquote 'I don't want the sleeve to get in the way of what the record is saying, which is an anti-drugs message', which he felt oversimplified the song's meaning once again. Cocker also criticised Thornton's decision to contact the father of a victim of an ecstasy-related death for a response. The Daily Mirror campaign continued, publishing their readers' response to a poll to have the song itself banned. The original sleeve was replaced with a plain white sleeve, once the initial pressing had sold out.

== Legacy ==
Despite its controversy, "Sorted for E's & Wizz" has seen critical acclaim since its release. Rolling Stone's David Fricke said of the song, "The way Cocker whispers the word 'down' is so soft and sad, you can almost feel the hurt and morning-after emptiness." AllMusic's Stephen Thomas Erlewine lauded the song's "subtle satire," while The Guardian praised the song's "comedown humour." Pitchfork Media called the song a "wistful flashback to the illegal outdoor raves of the late '80s and early '90s." PopMatters praised the song as "hilarious," while Drowned in Sound called the song "a fantastically sneering slap at the rave generation."

NME, whose readers ranked the song as Pulp's fifth best in a fan vote, wrote, "Everyone who has ever been to a festival can totally relate to this whoozy tale of getting messed up in a muddy field." Although Stereogum's Ryan Leas did not include it in his Top 10 Pulp songs, he noted that he almost ranked it at number ten, "purely on that awesome synth thing that happens about two and a half minutes in." Orange County Weekly named the song as the number four Pulp song for beginners.

== Track listing ==
All songs written and composed by Jarvis Cocker, Nick Banks, Steve Mackey, Russell Senior, Candida Doyle and Mark Webber; except where noted. The 12-inch vinyl was released in 1996 while the 7-inch vinyl was released in November 1996.

UK 7-inch vinyl and cassette single

1. "Mis-Shapes" – 3:45
2. "Sorted for E's & Wizz" – 3:42

UK CD1 and 12-inch vinyl

1. "Mis-Shapes" – 3:45
2. "Sorted for E's & Wizz" – 3:42
3. "P.T.A. (Parent Teacher Association)" – 3:15
4. "Common People" (Live at Glastonbury) (Jarvis Cocker, Nick Banks, Steve Mackey, Russell Senior, Candida Doyle) – 7:38

UK CD2

1. "Sorted for E's & Wizz" – 3:42
2. "Mis-Shapes" – 3:45
3. "Common People" (Motiv 8 Club Mix) (Cocker, Banks, Mackey, Senior, Doyle) – 7:50
4. "Common People" (Vocoda Mix) (Cocker, Banks, Mackey, Senior, Doyle) – 6:18

== Personnel ==
- Jarvis Cocker – vocals, acoustic guitar
- Mark Webber – electric guitar
- Candida Doyle – keyboards
- Russell Senior – violin
- Steve Mackey – bass guitar
- Nick Banks – drums

== Charts ==
All entries charted with "Mis-Shapes".

=== Weekly charts ===
Chart (1995)	Peak position
Europe (Eurochart Hot 100)	15
Ireland (IRMA)	6
Scottish Singles Sales (Official Charts)	2
UK Singles (Official Charts)	2

=== Year-end charts ===
Chart (1995)	Position
UK Singles (OCC)	50

== Certifications ==
Region	Certification	Certified units/sales
United Kingdom (BPI)	Silver	200,000^{^}
^{^} Shipments figures based on certification alone.
