= His 'n' Hers =

Studio album by Pulp
- Released: 18 April 1994
- Recorded: July 1992, October 1993 – February 1994 (Note: Except "Lipgloss" and "She's a Lady", recorded 2–10 July 1993; and "Babies", recorded 20–24 July 1992)
- Studios: Britannia Row, London (Note: Except "Babies", recorded at Island Records Fallout Shelter, London)
- Genre: Britpop
- Length: 50:38
- Label: Island
- Producer: Ed Buller

Pulp chronology
Intro – The Gift Recordings (1993)	His 'n' Hers (1994)	Masters of the Universe (1994)

Pulp studio album chronology
Separations (1992)	His 'n' Hers (1994)	Different Class (1995)

Singles from His 'n' Hers
- 1. "Lipgloss" Released: 15 November 1993; 2. "Do You Remember the First Time?" Released: 21 March 1994; 3. "The Sisters EP" Released: 23 May 1994

His 'n' Hers is the fourth studio album by English rock band Pulp, released on 18 April 1994 by Island Records. It proved to be the band's breakthrough album, reaching number nine on the UK Albums Chart, and was nominated for the 1994 Mercury Music Prize. In 1998, Q magazine readers voted it the seventieth greatest album of all time, while it was placed at number 110 in the book Virgin All-Time Top 1000 Albums.

== Themes and content ==
Lyrically, the album encompasses subjects for which Pulp were to become well known, including sexual encounters, social class and voyeurism.

Robyn Strachan retrospectively describes the opener "Joyriders" as setting the tone for the album with "acerbic observation and lurking seediness and decay".

"She's a Lady" takes much of its musical inspiration from Gloria Gaynor's "I Will Survive".

The album closer, "David's Last Summer", is notable as being one of Pulp's most narrative songs, delivered entirely in spoken word apart from the chorus despite being an uptempo track.

== Release and aftermath ==
Professional ratings
Review scores
Source	Rating
AllMusic	4.5/5 stars
Chicago Tribune	2/4 stars
Drowned in Sound	8/10
Encyclopedia of Popular Music	4/5 stars
NME	8/10
Q	4/5 stars
The Rolling Stone Album Guide	2.5/5 stars
Select	4/5
Spin	8/10
Uncut	5/5 stars

The CD edition of the album included a new remixed version of the song “Babies”, the original version of which was previously released as a single in 1992.

The album was preceded with two singles: "Lipgloss" and "Do You Remember the First Time?". The new mix of "Babies" was also released as a single as part of the Sisters EP.

The album was a long-awaited breakthrough for Pulp in the UK becoming their first charting album reaching number nine and later certified Gold.

A CD Deluxe edition of His 'n' Hers was released on 11 September 2006. It contained a second disc of B-sides, demos and rarities. The vinyl version of the Deluxe edition was released in 2012.

== Track listing ==
All lyrics are written by Jarvis Cocker; all music is composed by Pulp.

No.	Title	Length
1.	"Joyriders"	3:25
2.	"Lipgloss"	3:34
3.	"Acrylic Afternoons"	4:09
4.	"Have You Seen Her Lately?"	4:11
5.	"Babies" (does not appear on the album's vinyl release)	4:04
6.	"She's a Lady"	5:49
7.	"Happy Endings"	4:57
8.	"Do You Remember the First Time?"	4:22
9.	"Pink Glove"	4:48
10.	"Someone Like the Moon"	4:18
11.	"David's Last Summer"	7:01
Total length:		51:38

North American edition (bonus track)
No.	Title	Length
12.	"Razzmatazz"	3:41

Deluxe edition (bonus disc)
No.	Title	Origin	Length
1.	"Live On" (BBC Mark Goodier session)	Previously unavailable	3:58
2.	"You're Not Blind" (demo)	Previously unavailable	3:45
3.	"Space" (BBC Hit the North Session soundcheck)	Previously unavailable	3:27
4.	"The Boss" (demo)	Previously unavailable	2:27
5.	"Watching Nicky" (demo)	Previously unavailable	3:04
6.	"Frightened" (demo)	Previously unavailable	3:36
7.	"Your Sister's Clothes"	The Sisters EP	4:41
8.	"Seconds"	The Sisters EP	4:19
9.	"His 'n' Hers"	The Sisters EP	6:20
10.	"Street Lites"	B-side to "Do You Remember the First Time?"	5:56
11.	"You're a Nightmare" (BBC John Peel session)	B-side to "Lipgloss" (incorrectly noted as previously unavailable)	5:20
12.	"The Babysitter"	B-side to "Do You Remember the First Time?"	5:00
13.	"Deep Fried in Kelvin"	B-side to "Lipgloss"	9:49
Total length:			1:01:42 1:53:20

== Personnel ==
Pulp

- Jarvis Cocker – vocals, School piano, Vox Marauder guitar, EMS Synthi A
- Russell Senior – Fender Stratocaster guitar, violin, bowed bass
- Candida Doyle – Farfisa Professional organ, Stylophone 350S, Korg Trident II, Fender Rhodes piano, Wurlitzer piano, Hohner clavinette, Steinway grand piano
- Nick Banks – drums, percussion, treated cymbals, timpani, fire extinguisher
- Steve Mackey – Fender Jazz Bass

Artwork

- Philip Castle – Pulp portrait
- Kevin Westerberg – original photograph

== Charts ==
Chart (1994–1996)	Peak position
Icelandic Albums (Tonlist)	20
Scottish Albums (Official Charts)	40
UK Albums (Official Charts)	9

Chart (2026)	Peak position
Greek Albums (IFPI)	79

== Certifications ==
Region	Certification	Certified units/sales
United Kingdom (BPI)	Gold	100,000^{^}
^{^} Shipments figures based on certification alone.
