= Babies (song) =

Single by Pulp

from the album His 'n' Hers
- Released: 5 October 1992
- Recorded: 20–24 July 1992
- Studio: Island Records Fallout Shelter, London
- Genre: Britpop; new wave
- Label: Gift Records
- Composer: Pulp
- Lyricist: Jarvis Cocker
- Producer: Ed Buller

Pulp singles chronology
"O.U. (Gone, Gone)" (1992)	"Babies" (1992)	"Razzmatazz" (1993)

"Babies" is a song written and released by British indie-pop group Pulp. With a lyric about a boy spying on his friend's sister from a wardrobe, the song features a guitar riff which drummer Nick Banks had played for Pulp frontman Jarvis Cocker. Poppier and lighter than much of the band's earlier material, the song was released as a single.

"Babies" was first released as a single for Gift Records in 1992, accompanied by a music video directed by Cocker, but failed to chart. The song was included on the band's next album, His 'n' Hers, and was later remixed for the Sisters EP in 1994. This EP peaked at number 19 on the UK Singles Chart. The track has since seen critical acclaim and has been named by many writers as among Pulp's best songs.

== Background ==
Jarvis Cocker discussed the song with Will Hodgkinson in the 2009 Sky Arts programme Jarvis Cocker: Songbook. Cocker described the genesis for the song deriving from Pulp's drummer Nick Banks playing a few mistaken chords on the guitar, leading to some interesting sounds which Cocker then worked into a song. In another interview, Banks recalled the band had switched instruments as a way to generate new song ideas. He explained:

I was the germ of the song idea. ... We'd stopped for a cup of tea and I'd just picked up Jarvis' guitar and started playing two chords. So then Jarvis sort of said, 'What's those two chords you're playing there?' And I went, 'Well, one of them is G, no idea what the other one is.' ... Literally 20 minutes after I'd played those first two chords, we had the entire song, basically.

Cocker summed up the song as "a fairly poppy song with slightly iffy subject matter." He explained of the song's meaning, "'Babies' is just a thing you get up to when you are fourteen and certain things are still taboo and you get into situations because of curiosity." The Stanhope Road referred to in the song is in the Intake area of Sheffield.

The song's lighter tone was a significant departure for the band; Cocker noted the song's composition as "the first time we'd written a proper pop song." Cocker recounted the band's initial reaction, "At first I thought it sounds like indie dance, which really put me off. But Mark Webber, who wasn't in the group at the time, said, 'That's the best song you've written', and everybody seemed to like it. It was goodbye to the long, dark midnight of the soul, the Eurodisco with gothic leanings or whatever, and more of the recognisable Pulp of today, I suppose."

== Lyrics and music ==
Lyrically, "Babies" tells the story of a boy who is so enamoured with listening to his female friend's sister having sex that he begins to hide in the sister's wardrobe to spy on her. When the sister catches the boy in her wardrobe, they begin to have sex before being caught by the distraught female friend, who the boy is really in love with. To whom the boy says, "I know you won't believe it's true / I only went with her 'coz she looks like you." Ben Hewitt of The Guardian described the song as "an awkward kind of Bildungsroman: a coming-of-age story full of lust, betrayal and remorse about one youth's transition from sex-struck fledgling to guilty cad."

Musically, the song was noted by Ryan Leas of Stereogum for its "new wave-y guitar and synths," which he pointed to as a departure from Pulp's earlier work.

== Music videos ==
Two music videos for "Babies" were recorded. The first was directed by Cocker and was interspersed with clips of two sisters fooling around on a bed. it is currently available on the Hits DVD, and was previously included on the Sorted for Films and Vids VHS. Cocker reflected on the video in 2020, "The girls were real sisters. You know the group Saint Etienne? The younger girl was Bob Stanley's girlfriend at the time. She was good fun. She wasn't an actress but I thought she could play that part well. Her sister was two or three years older so their relationship was perfect for the song. They didn’t mind being nasty to each other."

Island Records had the band make another video to promote The Sisters EP, extracts from which have been used in the stage backdrops for Pulp's 2011/2012 reunion gigs as well as their appearance at Glastonbury in June 2025.

== Release ==
An early version of "Babies" was recorded with producer and former Pulp member Simon Hinkler, but it was passed over for single release in favour of "O.U. (Gone, Gone)" at the time. Hinkler recalled, "I always thought 'Babies' should have been the A-side. It's so obviously the single from that session, whereas 'O.U.' was probably the worst of the bunch. Jarvis enjoyed being difficult about such things." The first single release of the song, according to Cocker, "was recorded in the Fallout Shelter, underneath Island's Chiswick head office." This initial single did not chart. A remixed version is featured on the His 'n' Hers album, while the original single mix appeared on the Intro – The Gift Recordings and Hits compilations.

"Babies" was later re-released as the lead track from Pulp's The Sisters EP—"due to public and record company demand," according to Cocker. The rest of the EP, made up of songs not included on His 'n' Hers, included "Your Sister's Clothes," a sequel song to "Babies." The EP was commercially successful, reaching number 19 in the UK, becoming the band's highest charting release to that point.

== Reception ==
"Babies" has seen critical acclaim and has been labelled by many writers as one of Pulp's best songs. At the time of the song's release, reviewer David Bennun called the track, "budget magnificence... a blueprint for an epic to be constructed in a more liquid future"—to which Cocker responded, "That's quite a laff, that! That took us ages to do. But we've just got the instruments we ended up with." Q called the track "epic" and "one of the band's "first great singles." NME wrote that the song "retain[s] a sense of head-spinning grandeur after countless plays."

NME readers ranked the song as Pulp's fourth best in a fan vote, while Stereogum's Ryan Leas ranked it as the band's seventh best, calling it "one of the most recognizable and quintessentially Pulp songs out there." The Guardian named it as one of Pulp's ten best songs, writing, "What makes many of Pulp's finest singles so enchanting is that they unfold like little short stories, full of odd narrative bumps and lovable characters, with Cocker coming on like some sort of northern J.D. Salinger. Take 'Babies', the standout track from 1994's brilliant breakthrough His 'n' Hers, and one of Cocker’s best ever yarns." Orange County Weekly named the song as the number ten Pulp song for beginners.

In 2005, Freaky Trigger placed it at number 84 in their list of "The Top 100 Songs of All Time".

== Formats and track listings ==
All tracks written and composed by Jarvis Cocker, Russell Senior, Steve Mackey, Nick Banks and Candida Doyle.

- 12" vinyl
1. "Babies" – 4:07
2. "Styloroc (Nites of Suburbia)" – 3:13
3. "Sheffield: Sex City" – 8:34
- CD single
1. "Babies" – 4:07
2. "Styloroc (Nites of Suburbia)" – 3:13
3. "Sheffield: Sex City" – 8:34
4. "Sheffield: Sex City" (instrumental) – 8:33

== Personnel ==
- Jarvis Cocker – vocals, guitars, piano
- Russell Senior – guitars
- Candida Doyle – synthesizers, organ
- Steve Mackey – bass guitar
- Nick Banks – drums

== Charts ==
Chart (1994)	Peak position
Israel (IBA)	37
UK Singles (Official Charts)	19
UK Airplay (Music Week)	27

== Certifications ==
Region	Certification	Certified units/sales
United Kingdom (BPI)	Gold	400,000^{‡}
^{‡} Sales+streaming figures based on certification alone.
