= Lipgloss (song) =

1993 single by Pulp

Single by Pulp

from the album His 'n' Hers
- Released: 15 November 1993
- Studio: Britannia Row, London
- Length: 3:36
- Label: Island
- Composer: Pulp
- Lyricist: Jarvis Cocker
- Producer: Ed Buller

Pulp singles chronology
"Razzmatazz" (1993)	"Lipgloss" (1993)	"Do You Remember the First Time?" (1994)

Music video
- "Lipgloss" on YouTube

"Lipgloss" is a song by British rock band Pulp from their fourth album, His 'n' Hers (1994). With lyrics written by Pulp frontman Jarvis Cocker about the deterioration of social skills that comes with a relationship in the context of a breakup, the song was the first that the band worked on for their new record company, Island Records.

"Lipgloss" was released on 15 November 1993 as the first single from the album, charting at number 50 on the UK Singles Chart. This was the band's first moderate hit and its success convinced the band not to break up.

== Background ==
Lyrically, Cocker said of the song, "'Lipgloss' was specifically about social skills going rusty. That and the fear of large shopping malls like Meadowhall in Sheffield." Hot Press described the song as about "what a pisser it is when you go to all that trouble getting to know your girlfriend's friends and then she leaves you."

"Lipgloss" was the band's first single for Island Records, who gave the band more resources in production. The track was the first that the band recorded for their new record company. Bassist Steve Mackey joked of the song, "You know, it took a lot of money to get it to sound that way."

Now supported by a major label, Cocker said before the single's release that, if it did not succeed commercially, the band would break up. He stated, "We've always wanted to get to the stage where there were no excuses, really. Island seem to be doing a pretty competent job of getting records out and letting people know they're out. So if people don't buy the record then it'll be because they don't like us. And that's fair enough because at least they've had the chance, and if they don't want it then maybe it's time to start looking for something else to do."

== Release ==
"Lipgloss" was released as the first single from His 'n' Hers on 15 November 1993, an album whose working title was Lipgloss. The single also included on its B-side the song "Deep Fried in Kelvin," which Cocker described as "a long, apocalyptic inner city scenario about a block of flats in Sheffield called the Kelvin Flats." The single became the band's first charting single, reaching number 50. Cocker reflected, "With 'Lipgloss' we knew that you could see it was growing all the time, a bit of radio play and its coming in at 55 or whatever." The song was re-released on a red 7-inch vinyl single in the UK on 7 October 1996.

== Reception ==
"Lipgloss" has seen a positive reception from music critics. Writing in Select magazine, Stuart Maconie reviewed a live performance of the song before its release, writing: "Simply a straightforwardly marvelous pop song, so direct and refreshing that it will confound those who have the band tagged as a quirky novelty act." The Face called it a "great single." Stephen Thomas Erlewine wrote of the song, "There isn't just joy but transcendence here on the fuzz guitars that power the chorus of 'Lipgloss,'" while Simon Williams of the NME wrote that the song "retain[s] a sense of head-spinning grandeur after countless plays."

== Track listings ==
All songs were written and composed by Jarvis Cocker, Russell Senior, Steve Mackey, Nick Banks, and Candida Doyle.

- 7-inch cassette single
1. "Lipgloss" – 3:36
2. "You're a Nightmare" – 5:19
- 12-inch and CD single
1. "Lipgloss" – 3:36
2. "Deep Fried in Kelvin" – 9:49
3. "You're a Nightmare" – 5:19

== Personnel ==
- Jarvis Cocker – vocals
- Russell Senior – guitars
- Candida Doyle – synthesizers
- Steve Mackey – bass guitar
- Nick Banks – drums

== Charts ==
Chart (1993)	Peak position
UK Singles (OCC)	50
UK Airplay (Music Week)	38
