= Deborah Bone =

British mental health nurse

Deborah Bone MBE
- Bone (right) and Jarvis Cocker
- Born: 10 January 1963; Salford, Lancashire, England
- Died: 30 December 2014 (aged 51); Hinxworth, Hertfordshire, England
- Occupation: Mental health nurse
- Spouse: Colin Bone
- Children: 2

Deborah Louise Bone (10 January 1963 – 30 December 2014) was a British mental health nurse who created the Brainbox, co-created Step2 and who became the subject of the Pulp song "Disco 2000", written by her close friend Jarvis Cocker.

== Early years ==
Bone was born in Salford, England, later moved to Sheffield where her mother was friends with the mother of Jarvis Cocker, later a founder member of Pulp. When Bone was 10, her family moved to Letchworth, but she and Cocker remained friends.

At the age of 16, she began volunteering at Fairfield Hospital in Stotfold.

She was the subject of Cocker's song "Disco 2000", released in 1995, in which he sang:

Our mothers said we could be sister and brother / Your name is Deborah (Deborah) / It never suited ya.

Cocker performed the song at her 50th birthday party.

== Career ==
Bone qualified as a mental health nurse, eventually working for Hertfordshire Community NHS Trust as a service manager for early intervention and adolescent mental health service. While there, she set up their 'Step2 health' service as well as the Brainbox, which was created as a way to assist young people dealing with stress.

It was announced in the 2015 New Year's honours list that she had been made a Member of the Order of the British Empire (MBE) for "her services to children’s mental health".

== Death ==
Bone was affected by the bone marrow cancer multiple myeloma. She died at home on 30 December 2014, aged 51, the day her MBE was announced, and was survived by her husband Colin and two daughters.
