= Common People =

1995 single by Pulp

Single by Pulp

from the album Different Class
- B-side: "Underwear"
- Released: 22 May 1995
- Studio: The Town House (London, England)
- Genre: Britpop; rock
- Length: 5:50
- Label: Island
- Songwriters: Jarvis Cocker; Russell Senior; Steve Mackey; Nick Banks; Candida Doyle
- Producer: Chris Thomas

Pulp singles chronology
"Babies" (1994)	"Common People" (1995)	"Mis-Shapes" / "Sorted for E's & Wizz" (1995)

Music video
- "Common People" on YouTube

"Common People" is a song by English alternative rock band Pulp, released in May 1995 by Island Records as the lead single from their fifth studio album, Different Class (1995). It reached No. 2 on the UK Singles Chart, becoming a defining track of the Britpop movement as well as Pulp's signature song. In 2014, BBC Radio 6 Music listeners voted it their favourite Britpop song in an online poll. In a 2015 Rolling Stone readers' poll it was voted the greatest Britpop song.

The song is a critique of the wealthy wanting to be "like common people" – ascribing glamour to poverty. This phenomenon is referred to as slumming or "class tourism". The song was written by the band members Jarvis Cocker, Nick Banks, Candida Doyle, Steve Mackey and Russell Senior. Cocker had conceived the song after meeting a Greek art student while studying at the Central Saint Martins College of Art and Design in London (the college and the student feature in the lyrics). He came up with the tune on a Casiotone keyboard he had bought in a music store in Notting Hill, west London.

Justin Myers of the Official Charts Company wrote the song "was typical Pulp – a biting satire of posh people 'roughing it' and acting like tourists by hanging with the 'common people'. Jarvis delivered his scathing putdown with glee, in an iconic music video, directed by Pedro Romhanyi, featuring actress Sadie Frost as the posh woman on the receiving end of Jarvis' acid tongue." Pulp first performed the song in public during the band's set at the Reading Festival in August 1994. A year later, they performed it at Glastonbury Festival as the headline act. The song has since been covered by various artists. In 2004, a Ben Folds-produced cover version by William Shatner brought "Common People" to new audiences outside Europe.

== Inspiration ==
The idea for the song's lyrics came from an art student from Greece whom Pulp singer-songwriter Jarvis Cocker met while he was studying at the Central Saint Martins College of Art and Design. Cocker had enrolled in a film studies course at the college in September 1988 while taking a break from Pulp. He spoke about the song's inspiration in NME in 2013:

I'd met the girl from the song many years before, when I was at St Martin's College. I'd met her on a sculpture course, but at St Martin's you had a thing called Crossover Fortnight, where you had to do another discipline for a couple of weeks. I was studying film, and she might've been doing painting, but we both decided to do sculpture for two weeks. I don't know her name. It would've been around 1988, so it was already ancient history when I wrote about her.

In a 2012 question-and-answer session on BBC Radio 5 Live, Cocker said that he was having a conversation with the girl at the bar at college because he was attracted to her, but he found some aspects of her personality unpleasant. He remembered that at one point she had told him she "wanted to move to Hackney and live like 'the common people.'" Cocker used this phrase as the starting point for the song and embellished the situation for dramatic effect, for example reversing the situation in the song when the female character declares that "I want to sleep with common people like you" (Cocker said that in real life he had been the one wanting to sleep with the girl, and she had not been interested in him). Taking this inspiration, the narrator explains that his female acquaintance can "never be like common people" because even if she gets a flat where "roaches climb the wall" ultimately, "if [she] called [her] dad he could stop it all", in contrast to the true common people who can only "watch [their] lives slide out of view".

A BBC Three documentary failed to locate the woman, who, Cocker stated, could have been in any fine art course but that "sculpture" sounded better. The lyrics were in part a response by Cocker, who usually focused on the introspective and emotional aspects of pop, to more politically minded members of the band like Russell Senior. Furthermore, Cocker felt that 'slumming' was becoming a dominant theme in popular culture and this contributed to the single's rushed release. Cocker said "it seemed to be in the air, that kind of patronising social voyeurism...I felt that of Parklife, for example, or Natural Born Killers – there is that noble savage notion. But if you walk round a council estate, there's plenty of savagery and not much nobility going on."

In May 2015, Greek newspaper Athens Voice suggested that the woman who inspired the song is Danae Stratou, wife of Yanis Varoufakis, a former Greek finance minister. Stratou studied at St. Martin's between 1983 and 1988 and is the eldest daughter of a wealthy Greek businessman. Greek newspaper Ta Nea contacted Stratou, who replied that "I think the only person who knows for whom the song was written is Jarvis himself!", but the London Evening Standard reported that an email exchange with Varoufakis indicated that there was truth in the rumour. Katerina Kana, a Greek-Cypriot who also studied at St. Martins during that time, has claimed since 2012 that the song was about herself, but Cocker has not commented on this claim.

== Composition ==
Cocker came up with the tune on a small Casiotone MT-500 keyboard he had bought from the Music & Video Exchange shop in Notting Hill in west London. He thought the melody "seemed kind of catchy, but I didn't think too much about it". When he played it at rehearsals to the other members of the band, most of them were unimpressed; Steve Mackey said it reminded him of Emerson, Lake & Palmer's 1977 hit single "Fanfare for the Common Man". Keyboardist Candida Doyle was the only member of the group who spotted the potential of the tune, saying "I just thought it was great straight away. It must have been the simplicity of it, and you could just tell it was a really powerful song then." Cocker then wrote the lyrics inspired by his time in London. The song was first performed in public during the band's set at the Reading Festival in August 1994: Cocker revealed that he had written the majority of the lyrics the night before the band's performance, and he had trouble remembering them on stage the following day.

The band realised they had "written something that had slight pretensions to anthemic" and wanted to find a producer that could give them a big-sounding record. Veteran producer Chris Thomas was chosen and the single was recorded in a two-week period at The Town House in London. The group used all 48 tracks of the studio, filling them with a variety of sounds from keyboards and even a Stylophone to create the anthemic sound they were looking for: Thomas remembered that the band "were just coming up with stuff all the time, it was just trying things on here and there." To keep the single at around four minutes, the final verses that begin "Like a dog lying in a corner" were omitted, although they appear on the album version. These include the peak of the crescendo where Cocker reduces to an intense whisper and describes the life of "common people".

The tune bears "more than a passing resemblance" to the song "Los Amantes" by the Spanish group Mecano, which came out in 1988. However, Pulp were not accused of plagiarism despite the similarity.

== Music video ==
The accompanying music video for "Common People" was directed by Pedro Romhanyi, featuring an appearance from actress Sadie Frost and a dance routine improvised by Cocker on the day of shooting. The video also features a homage to the "Eleanor Rigby" sequence in the animated film Yellow Submarine, with everyday people stuck in repeating loops lasting less than a second. The club scenes were filmed inside Stepney's Nightclub on Commercial Road in the East End of London. The nightclub still had its original décor, including a 1970s dance floor, and was described as a "cultural icon" when under threat of demolition in 2007.

== Sleeve artwork ==
"Common People" was released on two CD singles, one a 'day-time CD' and the other a 'night-time CD', both showing the band sitting in a café at different times of day. Four posters available on the band's 2011 tour showed a classic Pulp record sleeve, with photography notes beneath. For the poster of the "Common People" 'day-time' CD single it read:

LOCATION: Frank's Sandwich Bar, Addison Bridge Place, London W4 (eat-in and takeaway available)
TIME: 4:05pm, Wednesday 30 November 1994
PHOTOGRAPHER: Donald Milne
CAMERA: 1979 Hasselblad 500CM with 80mm lens
FILM STOCK: Fuji Super G-400 (pushed 2 stops)
DESIGN: The Designer's Republic™
ORIGINAL SLEEVE NOTES: "There is a war in progress, don't be a casualty. The time to decide whose side you're on is here. Choose wisely. Stay alive in '95."

== Reception and legacy ==
"Common People" was a very popular song of the Britpop era with many critics praising Cocker's lyrics. The song was popular in the US music press. Larry Flick of Billboard wrote 'Layered in the fabric of "Common People" are soft keyboard threads and a majestic weave of blazing guitars. All this and witty lyrics to boot.' Andrew Mueller from Melody Maker named it Single of the Week, noting that it 'is remarkable for the eloquence with which it articulates the envy vs snobbery dynamic inspired by all good class struggles.' Another Melody Maker editor, Simon Reynolds, commented, 'Its populis sentiments are anchored in a specific, one-on-one instance of class combat. It's personal: the song smarts with the humiliation of being patronised, and takes revenge with gloating glee. The title itself is jarring, a reminder: I'd forgotten the word common could even be used in that snobbish sense, outside Alan Bennett plays like "A Chip in the Sugar".' Music & Media wrote 'Playing with electro and indie guitar pop like Blur on "Girls & Boys", Pulp come close to Kim Wilde's "Kids in America" with the intro to the Sex Pistols' "Anarchy in the UK".' Music Week gave the double single 5 out of 5, adding that the song "is epic-length Pulp". Sylvia Patterson from NME named it Mirth-Quakingly Obvious Single of the Week, writing, "A sound pop idea honed eloquently into a grand colossus of vindication in velveteen trews, this is the one that bestrides Jarvis' gifts for jocular panache and moulded songsmithery and radiates in the pop nook this week as Pulp's very own 'Sympathy for the Devil'. With even more jokes." Tony Cross from Smash Hits gave it a top score of five out of five, adding, "It's sad, funny, ironic, and all dressed up in pop music that's so melodramatically camp it could open a boy scout's jamboree." Charles Aaron of Spin considered it to be "smarter than Blur, and slyer than Elastica". He wrote that "Pulp finally conquered the British charts with this exhilarating slag on class slumming." He later ranked the song at No. 2 on his pick of the singles of 1996.

The song was Pulp's most popular single and has featured on more than 16 compilation albums since its original release. In 2006, an hour-long documentary on the song's composition and cultural impact was broadcast on BBC Three. In 2007, NME magazine placed "Common People" at No. 3 in its list of the 50 Greatest Indie Anthems Ever. Rock: The Rough Guide said that on the single's parent album Different Class, Cocker was "[s]tripping away the glamour from Britpop's idealization of the working class" (it had been performed on a TV programme called Britpop Now), and described the song as the centrepiece of the album and "one of the singles of the 90s". In a poll by the Triple J in July 2009, the Pulp original was placed at No. 81 on its "Hottest 100 of All Time" from over 500,000 votes cast.

In September 2010, Pitchfork listed "Common People" at No. 2 on their list of the Top 200 Tracks of the 1990s. In April 2014, listeners of BBC Radio 6 Music voted it as their favourite 'Britpop' song in an online poll conducted by the station to celebrate 20 years since the start of the Britpop era. DJ Steve Lamacq said: "It is one of the defining records of Britpop because it seemed to embrace the essence of the time so perfectly." In 2014, Paste also ranked "Common People" at No. 1 in its list of The 50 Best Britpop Songs. In 2015, Rolling Stone readers voted it the greatest Britpop song in a poll. As of October 2014 the single had sold 430,000 copies.

In 2021, it was listed at No. 75 on Rolling Stone's "Top 500 Best Songs of All Time".

The song has had multiple references in media and popular culture. In the 2023 film Saltburn, Rosamund Pike’s character Elspeth, emblematic of Common People’s subject matter, claims that the song was written about her, despite her ‘hardly knowing Jarvis’.

== Other Pulp versions ==
Different versions of "Common People" exist, including the recording from Pulp's headline act at Glastonbury Festival in 1995, a "Vocoda" mix and a radically different "Motiv8 club mix", which also appeared on the single "Sorted for E's & Wizz". The Vocoda mix later featured on the 2-disc version of Different Class, which was released in 2006.

== Track listings ==
All songs were written and composed by Jarvis Cocker, Nick Banks, Steve Mackey, Russell Senior and Candida Doyle except where noted.

- UK CD1 and cassette single
1. "Common People" (full-length version) – 5:51
2. "Underwear" – 4:07
3. "Common People" (7-inch edit) – 4:07
- UK CD2
1. "Common People" (full-length version) – 5:51
2. "Razzmatazz" (acoustic version) – 4:05
3. "Dogs Are Everywhere" (acoustic version) (Jarvis Cocker, Russell Senior, Candida Doyle, Magnus Doyle, Peter Mansell) – 3:05
4. "Joyriders" (acoustic version) – 3:31
- UK 7-inch yellow vinyl single
1. "Common People" (7-inch edit) – 4:07
2. "Underwear" – 4:07

== Personnel ==
Pulp

- Jarvis Cocker – vocals, organ, acoustic guitar
- Candida Doyle – synthesizers
- Mark Webber – electric guitars
- Steve Mackey – bass guitar
- Russell Senior – violin
- Nick Banks – drums, tambourine

Additional personnel

- Anne Dudley – piano
- Chris Thomas – producer, stylophone
- Olle Romo – programming
- David 'Chipper' Nicholas – engineering

== Charts ==
=== Weekly charts ===
Chart (1995–1996)	Peak position
Australia (ARIA)	65
Canada Rock/Alternative (RPM)	20
Europe (Eurochart Hot 100)	13
Europe (European Hit Radio)	22
France (SNEP)	49
Germany (GfK)	77
Ireland (IRMA)	9
Israel (IBA)	23
Norway (VG-lista)	5
Scottish Singles Sales (Official Charts)	2
Sweden (Sverigetopplistan)	4
Switzerland (Schweizer Hitparade)	42
UK Singles (Official Charts)	2
UK Pop Tip Club Chart (Music Week)	1

Chart (1996)	Peak position
Australia (ARIA)	99

=== Year-end charts ===
Chart (1995)	Position
Latvia (Latvijas Top 50)	12
Sweden (Topplistan)	30
UK Singles (OCC)	36
UK Pop Tip Club Chart (Music Week)	13

== Certifications ==
Region	Certification	Certified units/sales
New Zealand (RMNZ)	Platinum	30,000^{‡}
Spain (Promusicae)	Gold	30,000^{‡}
United Kingdom (BPI)	3× Platinum	1,800,000^{‡}
^{‡} Sales+streaming figures based on certification alone.

== Release history ==
Region	Date	Format(s)	Label(s)	Ref.
United Kingdom	22 May 1995	CD1; cassette	Island	
United Kingdom	29 May 1995	CD2	Island	
Australia	10 July 1995	CD; cassette	Island; Mercury	
Japan	25 November 1995	CD	Island	
United States	26 March 1996	Contemporary hit radio	Island	
United Kingdom	7 October 1996	7-inch vinyl	Island	

== William Shatner cover version ==
In 2004, Ben Folds produced a cover version of "Common People" for the William Shatner album Has Been that brought the song to an audience outside of the British Isles. This version begins with an electronic keyboard Britpop or disco sound, but quickly moves into a drum kit and guitar-heavy indie rock style. Reviewers were pleasantly surprised by Shatner's spoken-word presentation of Cocker's tirade against class tourism as Shatner's previous work had been widely mocked by reviewers. Folds abruptly replaces Shatner's voice with that of singer Joe Jackson, and then alternates and blends the two into a duet, bringing along a large chorus of young voices on the line "sing along with the common people", which finally replace Shatner and Jackson's vocals in the song's concluding crescendo.

In 2011, Cocker praised the cover version: "I was very flattered by that because I was a massive Star Trek fan as a kid and so you know, Captain Kirk is singing my song! So that was amazing."

In a listeners' poll by Australian radio station Triple J, this cover version was ranked No. 21 on its Hottest 100 of 2004 poll. In 2007, a ballet called Common People, set to the songs from Has Been, was created by Margo Sappington and performed by the Milwaukee Ballet.

== Other covers ==
In 2007, impressionist Rory Bremner performed a version of the song, as sung by David Cameron on Channel 4's Bremner, Bird and Fortune.

American rock band My Chemical Romance covered "Common People" multiple times on stage during their 2010-2011 World Contamination Tour. In an interview, lead singer Gerard Way explained that the song was important to him growing up because it "speaks to regular people."

UK dark wave band Libitina covered the song as "Gothic People", with subtly altered lyrics referencing clichés of the goth subculture.

In February 2019, the news website Joe.ie released a speech sampled parody version of the song with the British Brexit supporting MP Jacob Rees-Mogg supposedly singing "I want to leave the Common Market" instead of "I want to sleep with common people".

== See also ==
- Love of the Common People

== Bibliography ==
- The Story of... Common People – Pulp. BBC Three, broadcast 14 February 2006.
- McCombe, J. (2014). “Common People”: Realism, class difference, and the male domestic sphere in Nick Hornby's Collision with Britpop. Modern Fiction Studies, 60(1), pp. 165–184. doi:10.2307/26421708
