= Steve Mackey =

English musician and record producer (1966–2023)

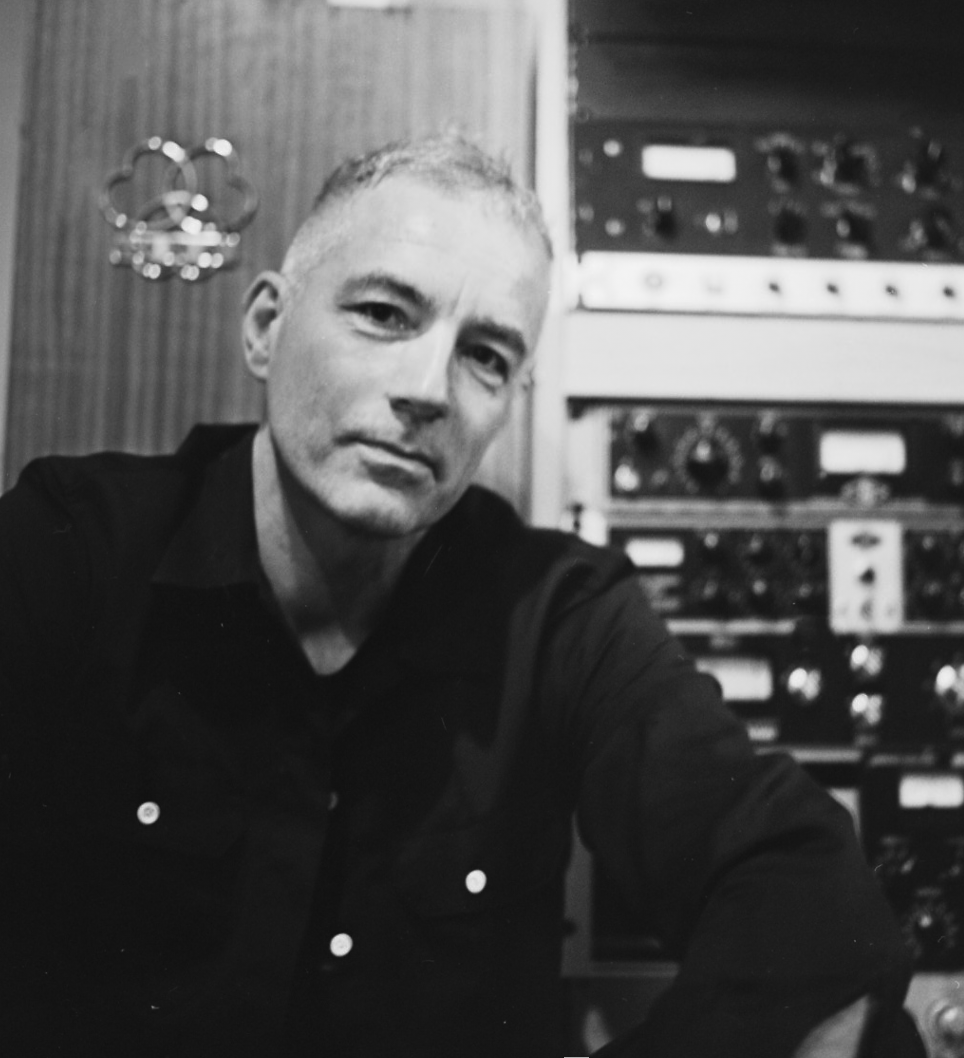

Background information
- Born: Stephen Patrick Mackey; 10 November 1966; Sheffield, England
- Died: 2 March 2023 (aged 56) London, England
- Genres: Alternative rock; Indie rock; Britpop
- Occupations: Musician; record producer
- Instruments: Bass guitar
- Years active: Mid-1980s–2023
- Formerly of: Cavemen; Trolley Dog Shag; Pulp

Stephen Patrick Mackey (10 November 1966 – 2 March 2023) was an English musician and record producer best known as the bass guitarist for the Britpop band Pulp, which he joined in 1989. As a record producer, he produced songs and albums by M.I.A., Florence + the Machine, The Long Blondes and Arcade Fire.

== Early life ==
Mackey was born in Manchester on 10 November 1966, and moved to Sheffield. In his early years he attended Hucklow First and Middle Schools with friend Richard Hawley, who would later play with Pulp as a touring musician. He attended Hinde House Comprehensive in Sheffield before undertaking further studies at Richmond College of Further Education.

Before joining Pulp, he played bass for another Sheffield band called Trolley Dog Shag, who were featured alongside Pulp on a Dolebusters compilation album in 1987. He moved to London in 1988 to pursue an interest in film-making and graduated from London's Royal College of Art, in 1992, MA Film.

== Pulp ==
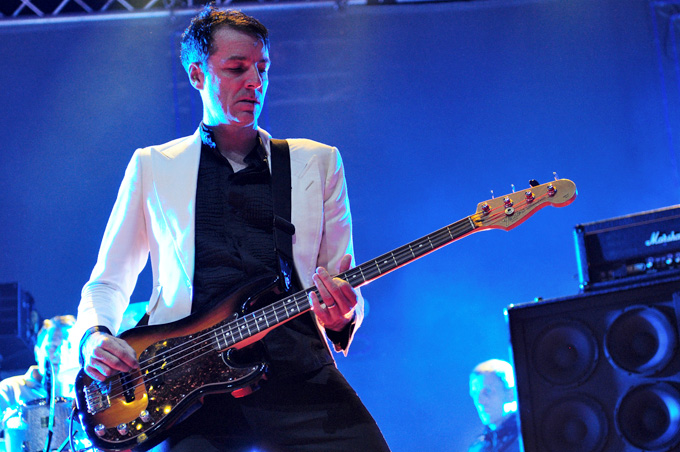
Mackey with Pulp in 2011

Joining Pulp in 1989, he played on Separations, released on Fire Records. He continued to write, record and tour with the band as they found success in the 1990s. Subsequent albums recorded included Intro – The Gift Recordings, His 'n' Hers, Different Class, This Is Hardcore and We Love Life.

After an eight year hiatus Mackey returned to activity with Pulp in 2010 and their subsequent world tours in 2011 and 2012 and the release of their single "After You", working with producer James Murphy of LCD Soundsystem. Before his death, Mackey had announced he would not be part of Pulp's 2023 reunion tour.

== Further music career ==
Forming a songwriting/production partnership with Ross Orton (known as Cavemen), he met Maya Arulpragasam (M.I.A.) and co-wrote and produced "Galang" and "Sunshowers", which led to M.I.A. securing a deal with Interscope Records and releasing "Arular". They worked together again on "Bird Flu" from her subsequent album Kala. Mackey and Orton continued to produce and remix for artists including Kelis, Cornershop, The Kills and The Horrors. Mackey also produced and co-wrote songs for Florence and the Machine's debut album Lungs, including "Kiss with a Fist", "Girl with One Eye" and "Swimming" and also The Long Blondes' debut album Someone to Drive You Home. During this period he continued to record and tour with Jarvis Cocker, in 2006 for his debut solo album for Rough Trade Records (Jarvis) and again in 2008 recording the album Further Complications at Electrical Studios, Chicago with Steve Albini.

In 2011 Mackey produced Summer Camp's Welcome to Condale album and in 2012 he again worked as producer for Palma Violets' debut album on Rough Trade Records, 180, released in February 2013. Also in 2012 he produced "Railroad Track" by Willy Moon released on Jack White's Third Man Records.

In 2014 he recorded and mixed for Dean Blunt's Black Metal album and in 2015 began working with Yak, recording their single "No" released on Third Man Records. He mixed Danny Goffey of Supergrass' Take Your Jacket Off and Get into It LP. Yak's Alas Salvation LP was recorded with him during the rest of 2015 and released in early 2016.

In 2017 he was awarded an Ivor Novello Award along with the other members of Pulp for Outstanding Song Collection, presented by Peter Saville, graphic designer of record sleeves for Joy Division, New Order and Pulp.

Mackey has also worked with John Gosling (formerly of Psychic TV) as a music director and sound designer creating mixes and original compositions for films, museums and other commercial projects, including the Museum of Modern Art in New York City, the Louvre in Paris, and the Minsheng Art Museum in Shanghai.

== Other projects ==
In 2005, Mackey played a cameo role as one of The Weird Sisters, a wizarding rock band in the film Harry Potter and the Goblet of Fire. The fictitious group also featured Jonny Greenwood and Phil Selway of Radiohead and Pulp frontman Jarvis Cocker.

In 2006, Mackey and Cocker curated an acclaimed 2 CD compilation called The Trip featuring music from various eras including Moondog, Carl Orff, The Birthday Party, The Fall and the theme to Radio 4's Shipping Forecast.

From 2003 to 2008, Mackey co-curated the music program of London's annual Frieze International Art Fair, which included performances from Karlheinz Stockhausen, Sunn O))), Glenn Branca, and Rodney Graham.

In 2012, he played with drummer Seb Rochford as the rhythm section for tracks on Serafina Steers The Moths Are Real LP.

In 2016, he began the Call This Number guerrilla TV project with Jeannette Lee, formerly of Public Image Ltd. and Douglas Hart, former bassist of the Jesus and Mary Chain, making erratic film broadcasts from a North London garage. Artists he recorded for this included Jon Spencer Blues Explosion, Dennis Bovell, Sleaford Mods, Primal Scream, and Gruff Rhys.

== Personal life and death ==
In 2009, Mackey married his longtime girlfriend, stylist and fashion journalist Katie Grand. He lived in North London with his wife, and son, Marley (born 1996). Marley Mackey is a member of the South London post-punk band Warmduscher.

Mackey died on the morning of 2 March 2023. He was 56, and had been in hospital in London for the past three months with an undisclosed illness. A later post on Mackey’s Instagram mentioned "3 AVM brain bleeds" that he had had during his hospital stay.

== Discography ==
=== Studio albums ===
- Separations (1992)
- His 'n' Hers (1994) (#9 UK, Gold)
- Different Class (1995) (#1 UK, 4× Platinum)
- This Is Hardcore (1998) (#1 UK, No. 114 US, Gold)
- We Love Life (2001) (#6 UK, Silver)

=== Compilations ===
- Intro – The Gift Recordings – non-album singles compilation (1993)
- Countdown 1992–1983 – compilation of tracks from the Fire/Red Rhino era (1996) No. 10 UK
- Pulp Goes to the Disco (1998)
- Freshly Squeezed... the Early Years – North-American release (1998)
- Primal: The Best of the Fire Years 1983–1992 (1998)
- Pulped 1983–1992 – four-CD box set, featuring the first three albums, plus Masters of the Universe (2000)
- Hits – official greatest hits compilation (2002) No. 71 UK
- The Peel Sessions (2006) – compilation of all the Peel sessions from Pulp

=== Singles ===
Title	Release date	UK Singles Chart
"My Legendary Girlfriend" / "Is This House?" / "This House Is Condemned" (remix)	Mar 1991	-
"Countdown" (single version) / "Death Goes to the Disco" / "Countdown" (extended)	Aug 1991	-
"O.U. (Gone, Gone)" (radio edit) / "O.U. (Gone, Gone)" (12" mix) / "Space"	Jun 1992	-
"My Legendary Girlfriend" (live) / "Sickly Grin" (demo) / "Back in L.A." (demo)	Aug 1992	-
"Babies" / "Styloroc (Nights of Suburbia)" / "Sheffield: Sex City"	Oct 1992	-
"Razzmatazz" / "Stacks" / "Inside Susan" / "59, Lyndhurst Grove"	Feb 1993	80
"Lipgloss" / "You're a Nightmare" / "Deep Fried in Kelvin"	Nov 1993	50
"Do You Remember the First Time" / "Street Lites" / "The Babysitter"	Apr 1994	33
The Sisters EP ("Babies" / "Your Sister's Clothes" / "Seconds" / "His 'n' Hers")	Jun 1994	19
"Common People" / "Underwear"	Jun 1995	2
"Mis-Shapes" / "Sorted for E's & Wizz" / "P.T.A." (Parent Teacher Association) / "Common People" (Live at Glastonbury)	Oct 1995	2
"Disco 2000" (7" mix) / "Disco 2000" (album mix) / "Ansaphone" / "Live Bed Show" (extended)	Dec 1995	7
"Disco 2000" (album mix) / "Disco 2000" (7" mix) / "Disco 2000" (Motiv 8 Discoid Mix) / "Disco 2000" (Motiv 8 Gimp Dub)	Dec 1995	7
"Something Changed" / "Mile End"	Apr 1996	10
"Help the Aged" / "Tomorrow Never Lies" / "Laughing Boy"	Nov 1997	8
"This Is Hardcore" / "Ladies' Man" / "The Professional" / "This Is Hardcore" (end of the line remix)	Mar 1998	12
"This Is Hardcore (original version)" / "This Is Hardcore (Hero remix)" / "This Is Hardcore (Swedish Erotica remix)" / "This Is Hardcore" (Stock, Hausen and Walkman's remix)	Mar 1998	12
"Like a Friend" (US promo)	Mar 1998	-
"A Little Soul" / "Cocaine Socialism" / "Like a Friend"	Jun 1998	22
"A Little Soul" / "A Little Soul" (Lafayette Velvet revisited mix) / "That Boy's Evil"	Jun 1998	22
"Party Hard" / "We Are the Boyz" / "The Fear" (The Complete and Utter Breakdown Version)	Sep 1998	29
"Sunrise" / "The Trees" / "Sunrise" (Fat Truckers/Scott free mix)	Oct 2001	23
"The Trees" / "Sunrise" / "The Trees" (felled by I Monster)	Oct 2001	23
"Bad Cover Version" / "Yesterday" / "Forever in My Dreams"	Apr 2002	27

Steve Mackey has also made appearances on the following albums as a musician:

- Various Artists – See You Later Agitator (compilation, 1987)

- Trolley Dog Shag, : "(This is) The Business Boys", 1987

- Marianne Faithfull – Kissin' Time (2002)

- Track: "Sliding through Life on Charm"

- Various Artists – The Last Great Wilderness Soundtrack (2003)

- With band The Nu Forest, track: "I Picked a Flower" (also released as a single)

- Various Artists – Harry Potter and the Goblet of Fire Soundtrack (2005)

- With band The Weird Sisters, tracks: "Do the Hippogriff", "This is the Night", "Magic Works"

- Various Artists – Pirate Ballads, Sea Songs and Chanteys (compilation, 2006)

- With artist Jarvis Cocker, track: "A Drop of Nelson's Blood"

- Jarvis Cocker – Jarvis (2006)
- Jarvis Cocker – Further Complications (2009)
- Serafina Steer – The Moths are Real (2013)

=== As a songwriter/producer ===
Steve Mackey has appeared on the following albums as a Producer:

- Marianne Faithfull – Kissin' Time (2002)

- Track: – "Sliding Through Life on Charm" (with Jarvis Cocker)

- M.I.A. – Arular (2005)

- Tracks: "Sunshowers" and "Galang" (both with Ross Orton and Maya Arulpragasam)

- M.I.A. – Kala (2007)

- Tracks: "Bird Flu" (with Ross Orton )

- Bromheads Jacket- Dits from the Commuter Belt (2006)

With Ross Orton

- Ultra Brain – Neo Punk (2006)

With Ross Orton

- The Long Blondes – Someone to Drive You Home (2006)
- Florence and the Machine – "Kiss With a Fist"
- Summer Camp – "Welcome to Condale" (2011)
- Palma Violets – "180" (2013)
- Willy Moon – "Railroad Track/ Here's Willy Moon" (2013)
- Arcade Fire - "Everything Now" (2017)
- Jerkcurb - "Air Con Eden" (2019)

=== As a remixer ===
Steve Mackey is also known for his remixes, and he has remixed the following tracks (among others):

- Looper – Up a Tree Again (The Chocolate Layers' St John's Ambulance mix)

Appears on: Looper – Who's Afraid of Y2K? / Up a Tree Again single (1999)

- Black Box Recorder – The Facts of Life (The Chocolate Layers' Remix)

Appears on: Black Box Recorder – The Art Of Driving single (2000) and The Worst of Black Box Recorder (compilation, 2001)

- Death in Vegas – Dirge (Cossack apocalypse mix by the Chocolate Layers)

Appears on: Death in Vegas – Dirge promo single (2000)

- The White Sport – Complete Control (King Precare Mix by Two Desperate People) (Jarvis Cocker)

Appears on: The White Sport – Complete Control single (2002)

- Cornershop – Topknot (Cavemen Remix)

Appears on: Cornershop – Topknot single (2004)

- M.I.A. – Galang (Cavemen Remix)

Appears on: M.I.A. – Galang single (2004)

- M.I.A. – Bird Flu (Cavemen Remix)

Appears on: M.I.A. – Kala album (bonus track) (2007)

- Budnubac – Indestructible (Cavemen's 'Insecure' Mix)

Appears on: Budnubac – Indestructible single (2004)

- Dark Globe – Break My World (Break My Bones Mix – Steve Mackey and The Fat Truckers)

Appears on: Dark Globe – Break My World single (2004)

- The Kills – Love is a Deserter (Cavemen Remix)

Appears on: The Kills – Love Is A Deserter single (2005)

- Death from Above 1979 – Romantic Rights (Cavemen's Death From The Inside Remix)

Appears on: Death from Above 1979 – You're a Woman, I'm A Machine album (2005)

- The Perceptionists – Party Hard (Cavemen Remix)

Appears on: The Perceptionists – Party Hard promo single (2005)

- Archie Bronson Outfit – Dead Funny (Cavemen Remix)

Appears on: Archie Bronson Outfit – Dead Funny single (2006)

- Kelis – Bossy (Cavemen Remix)

Appears on: Kelis – Bossy single (2006)

- The Horrors – "She is The New Thing"
- Arcade Fire – "Put Your Money on Me (Steve Mackey Remix)" (2018)

Notes:

- The Chocolate Layers remixes are by Steve Mackey and Jarvis Cocker
- The Cavemen remixes are by Steve Mackey and Ross Orton
