= Candida Doyle =

Irish keyboardist

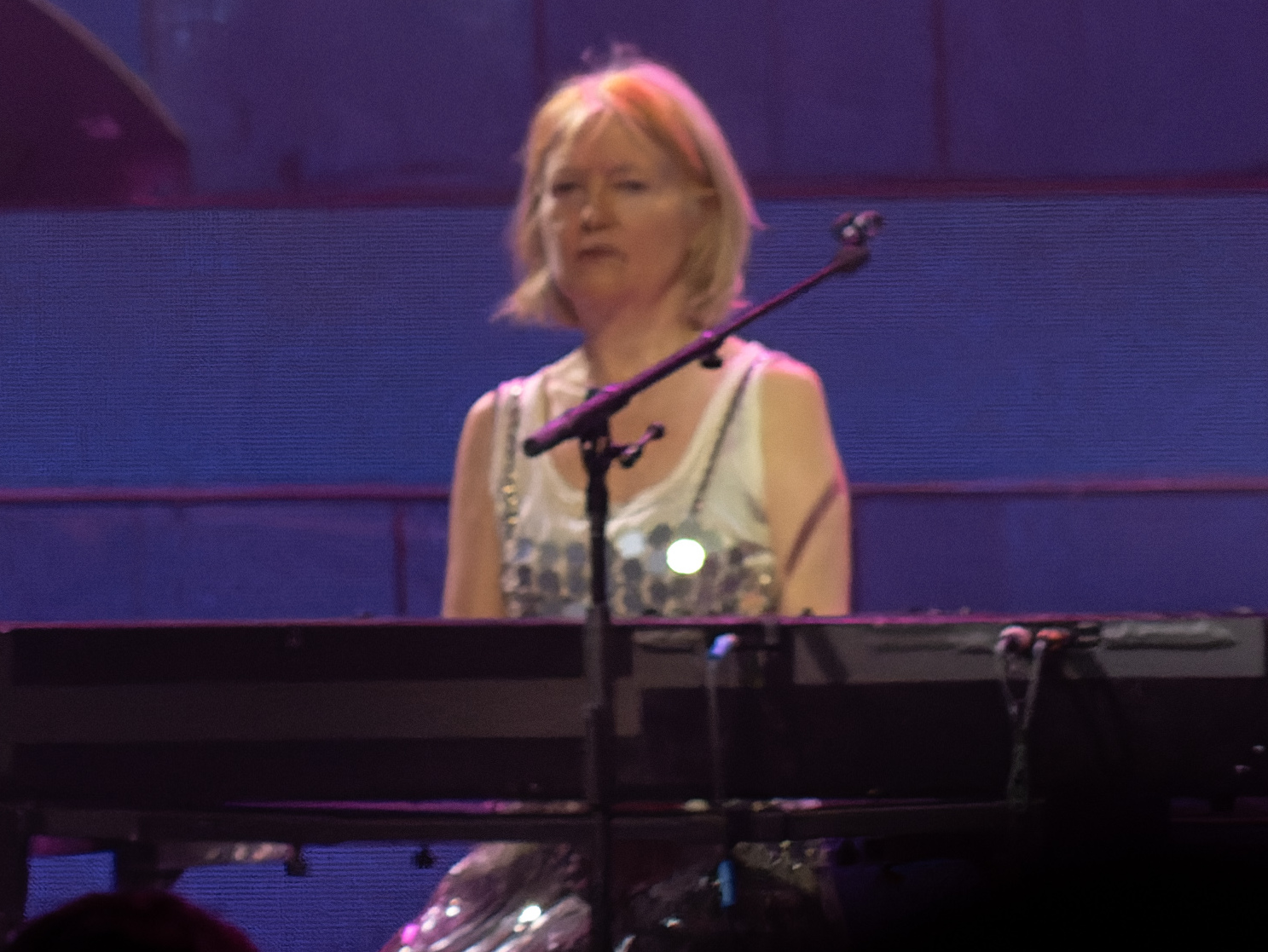
- Doyle in 2023

Background information
- Born: Candida Mary Doyle; 1963 or 1964 (age 62–63); Belfast, Northern Ireland
- Genres: Alternative rock, post-punk, Britpop, indie rock, indie pop, art rock
- Occupations: Musician
- Instruments: Keyboards; vocals
- Member of: Pulp

Candida Mary Doyle (born 1963 or 1964) is a musician from Northern Ireland. She is the keyboardist for the band Pulp, which she joined in 1984. She joined her brother, drummer Magnus Doyle, in the line-up to replace the previous keyboard player, Tim Allcard, who had left the band.

== Biography ==
Candida Mary Doyle was born in Belfast, Northern Ireland to Sandra Voe and Rex Doyle. Both of her parents were actors. She has two musician brothers, Magnus Doyle and Daniel Doyle. Her grandfather owned a fishing factory in the Shetland Islands.

Doyle attended piano lessons from age 8, but did not practise despite finding the experience enjoyable. At 16 she began suffering from rheumatoid arthritis, which was diagnosed when she was 17. She was informed that there was the possibility that her conditions could worsen to point that by the age of 30 she could be in a wheelchair. Depressed by the impact of the rheumatoid arthritis on her body she left school when she was in the sixth form. She later commented, "I think because I was living every day and night with discomfort, and I wasn't that interested [...] I just wanted to date boys, go dancing and see groups."

When Pulp's keyboard player, Tim Allcard, left the band in 1984 her brother, drummer Magnus Doyle, suggested her as his replacement.

During Doyle's first few years in the group, Pulp were not enjoying financial success; she said that she spent more money on the band than she made from it. She kept jobs in two toy shops in Manchester, before being sacked from one for a "lack of dedication". Although Pulp "sort of split up" in the period around 1986, they went on to release Freaks in 1987 with Doyle on board for her first album. She then remained a member of the group for the 1990s, an integral part of the band's sound as they progressed towards fame. With Pulp, Doyle recorded the albums and compilations Separations, Intro – The Gift Recordings, His 'n' Hers, Different Class, This Is Hardcore, and We Love Life; songs featuring Doyle include "Common People", "Disco 2000", "Do You Remember the First Time?", "Babies", "Something Changed", "This Is Hardcore", and "Sunrise", as well as every other Pulp song recorded during this time.

When playing live with the band Doyle has used Farfisa Compact Professional electronic organs and Roland XP-10 synthesizers as well as Akai S3000 samplers.

When Pulp began a hiatus in 2002, Doyle went travelling for a year. During the hiatus she occasionally appeared live with Jarvis Cocker. Following this period, with Pulp's 2011 reunion, Doyle joined the rest of the Different Class line-up on stage in concert for their UK comeback gig at the Isle of Wight Festival on 11 June 2011. This reunion ended in 2013, but a decade later, Doyle would return to the stage with Cocker and Pulp veterans Nick Banks and Mark Webber, performing new Pulp shows.
