= Russell Senior =

British musician

- Born: Russell Senior; 1961 (age 64–65); Sheffield, England
- Genres: Alternative rock; post-punk; Britpop; indie rock; indie pop; art rock
- Occupations: Musician; record producer; playwright
- Instruments: Guitar; violin; vocals
- Years active: 1978–present
- Formerly of: Pulp; Venini

Russell Senior (born 1961) is a British musician, record producer, and playwright. He is best known as the former guitarist and violinist of Pulp and Venini as well as for his production work with The Long Blondes and Art Brut.

== Early life ==
Senior was born and grew up in Sheffield. Whilst at the University of Bath, he formed the Dada Society (also known as the New Wave Society) and appeared as the lead role in a dramatic adaptation of Kafka's The Trial. He also had a band called The Nightmares and arranged for a gig at the University featuring his friends from Sheffield - Pulp. He obtained a 2.1 honours degree in Business Administration, and went back to Sheffield to join Pulp. During the miners' strike of 1984 he was a flying picket, taking part in industrial action including the Battle of Orgreave.

== Pulp ==
Senior first met Pulp in 1980 when he reviewed a show of theirs for his fanzine, also called The Bath Banker. He joined the third line-up of the band in 1983, the other members being Jarvis Cocker (vocals/guitar), Magnus Doyle (drums) and Peter Mansell (bass). During the mid-1980s he was a central member of the group, often taking vocal duties. He also played the violin on a number of tracks.

In the earlier days of the band, Senior wrote lyrics and/or provided vocals for a number of songs such as "Fairground" and "Anorexic Beauty" on Freaks and "This House is Condemned" on Separations.

As the band became successful, Senior became dissatisfied with the touring, recording and publicity treadmill the band found themselves on after their long-awaited success, and on 20 January 1997 he left Pulp to work on other projects. He commented that he did not like the Cocker-led song "Help the Aged", and that he didn't feel it was a worthy follow-up to "Common People", and so deliberately tried to sabotage it in the studio. Soon afterwards, feeling his unhappiness was leading the atmosphere in the band to become poisonous, he told Cocker he was quitting. In an interview he said that "I was very proud of being in Pulp. I thought it was the best band in the world when I was in it, but I want to be able to move on from it at some point."

In 2010 he revealed he was still friendly with his old band members, and said he left in 1997 because, "I liked the idea of ending on a high, I didn't want to slowly fade away."

In November 2010, it was announced that Pulp were to reform and play live in 2011, which included Senior in the line-up. He however did not continue with the band for their 2012 tour.

In October 2015, Senior released his first book, Freak Out the Squares: Life in a Band Called Pulp. Within the book, Senior recalls stories of the band's earlier days, their rise to fame and his decision to leave. Alongside this, he gives personal recounts and diary entries of the reunion tour, and the toll it takes on him and his fellow band members. The book released to positive reviews, with an overall of 4/5 on Goodreads.

== Other work ==
In 1999 he formed Venini with Debbie Lime (vocals), Nick Eastwood (bass - later of Hiem), Bob Barton (drums - later with The Human League), and Daniel Hunt (keyboards - later of Ladytron). They released three singles before splitting in 2000.

Senior has also worked as a producer with Baby Birkin and more recently The Long Blondes. In March 2006, British indie band Art Brut invited him to produce their second album.

He has co-written a musical about the 1980s miners strike, Two Tribes, with Ralph Razor.

== Personal life ==
He continues to live in Sheffield with his girlfriend and has two children. Aside from the music world he is also a dealer in antique glassware.
