= Nick Banks =

English drummer

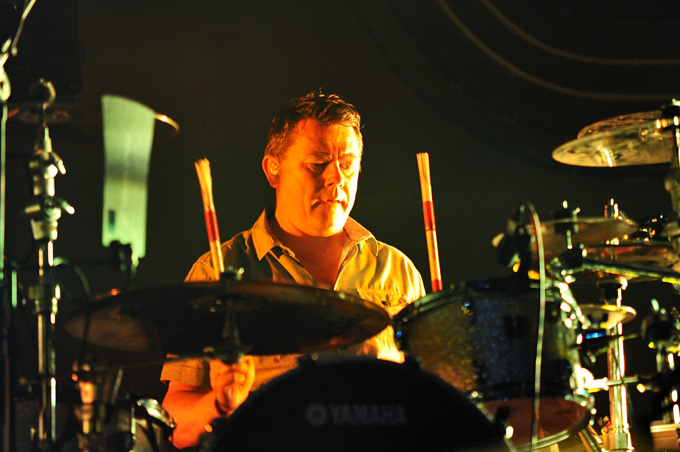
Banks performing with Pulp in 2011

Nicholas David Banks is an English drummer, a member of the British band Pulp. He lives in Sheffield with his wife Sarah and two children. He is the nephew of Gordon Banks, goalkeeper of the 1966 FIFA World Cup-winning England squad.

Nick started playing drums aged 14 and was inspired by Paul Cook from the Sex Pistols and Blondie's Clem Burke.

He saw many of Pulp's early performances in Sheffield and eventually joined the group in 1986 because "they were [his] favourite band".

Banks also played drums in a Sheffield-based band called Pollinates.

Since 2007 he has been managing Banks Pottery, a family-owned business which was previously run by his mother. He plays regularly in Sheffield's Everly Pregnant Brothers and BigShambles and remains a member of Pulp.

In 2023, Banks published a memoir entitled So It Started There, recounting his time in Pulp.
