= Pulp discography =

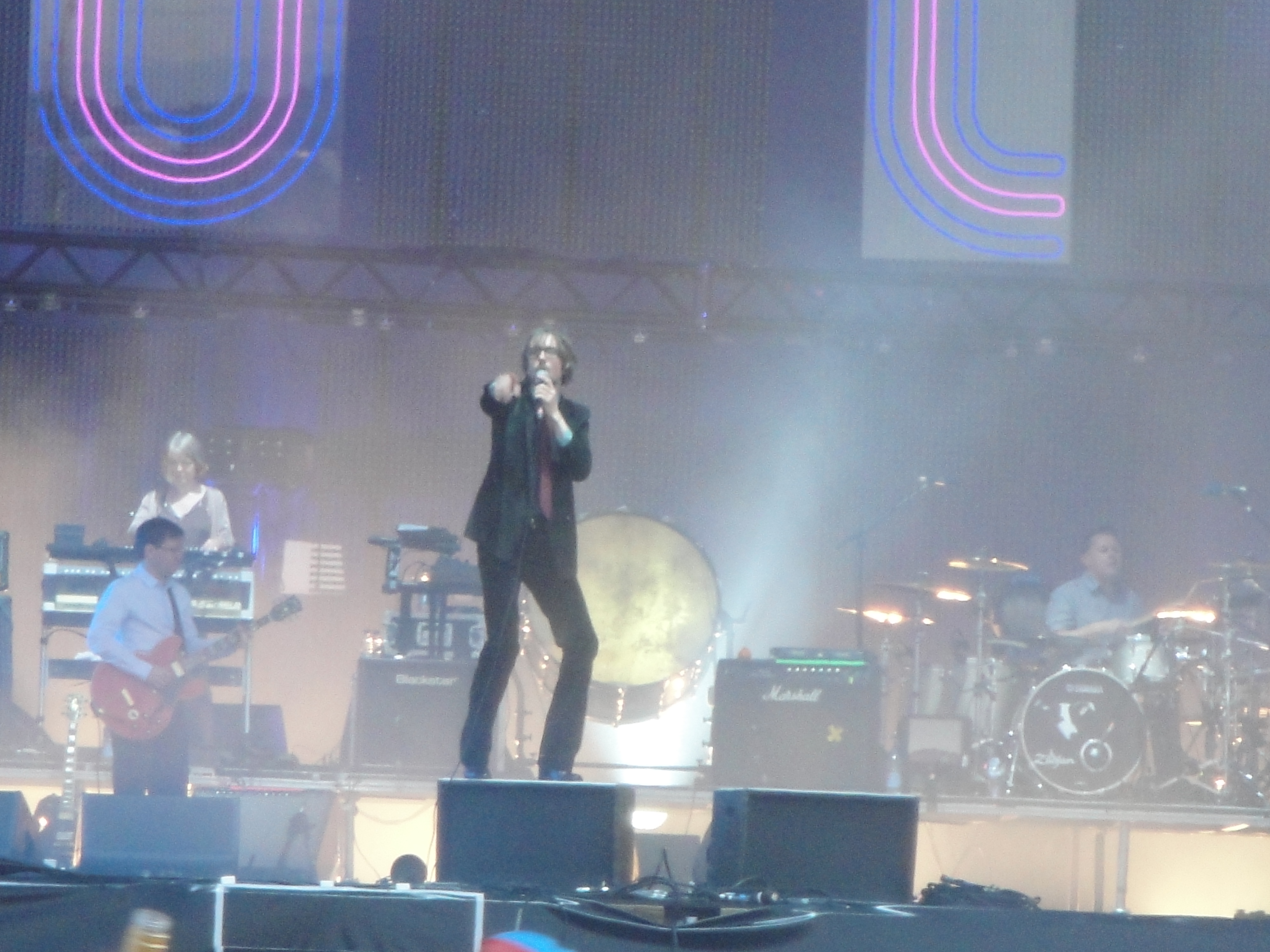
- Pulp performing live at the Isle of Wight Festival in 2011
- Studio albums: 8
- Live albums: 2
- Compilation albums: 9
- Singles: 26
- Video albums: 6
- Music videos: 22
- Box sets: 2

The discography of Pulp, an English Britpop band, consists of eight studio albums, nine compilation albums, two live albums and 26 singles. They were formed in 1978 by Jarvis Cocker and had a continuously rotating band membership until 1991. Between 1991 and their hiatus on 15 December 2002, their line-up was largely settled. They rose to prominence during the Britpop era in the early 1990s with their album His 'n' Hers (1994).

Pulp released two albums and eight singles in the 1980s, which garnered little attention from audiences or critics. Their first charting single was "Razzmatazz" (1993), which reached No. 80 in the UK Singles Chart. His 'n' Hers (1994) was their first charting album, peaking at No. 9 in the UK Albums Chart.

As Pulp became part of the Britpop music scene, they scored their first major hits, most notably "Common People" and "Disco 2000". Their 1995 album Different Class was a commercial success, peaking at No. 1 in the UK and going Platinum four times. Two further albums, This Is Hardcore (1998) and We Love Life (2001), achieved moderate commercial success.

Fire Records, who own the material from the band's first three albums, re-released Pulp's material several times after they achieved success in a number of compilation albums, most of which had little commercial success.

In 2013, Pulp released the single "After You", written a number of years earlier but never fully finished or released until then. It peaked at No. 101 on the UK Singles Chart and in the Top 10 of the UK Indie chart. The band released its first studio album in 24 years, More in June 2025 and entered the UK Album Charts at #1, scoring their third #1 album and first since their 1990s commercial peak.

== Albums ==
=== Studio albums ===
Title	Details	Peak chart positions										Certifications
Title	Details	UK	AUS	AUT	BEL	CAN	FRA	GER	NOR	SWE	SWI	Certifications
It	Released: 18 April 1983; Label: Red Rhino (REDLP29); Formats: CD, LP	—	—	—	—	—	—	—	—	—	—	
Freaks	Released: 11 May 1987; Label: Fire (FIRELP5); Formats: CD, cassette, LP	—	—	—	—	—	—	—	—	—	—	
Separations	Released: 19 June 1992; Label: Fire (FIRE11026); Formats: CD, cassette, LP	—	—	—	—	—	—	—	—	—	—	
His 'n' Hers	Released: 18 April 1994; Label: Island (ILPS8025); Formats: CD, cassette, LP	9	—	—	—	—	—	—	—	—	—	BPI: Gold
Different Class	Released: 30 October 1995; Label: Island (ILPS8041); Formats: CD, cassette, LP	1	44	24	47	36	—	71	19	7	—	BPI: 4× Platinum; IFPI: Platinum
This Is Hardcore	Released: 30 March 1998; Label: Island (ILPSD 8066); Formats: CD, LP, cassette	1	15	20	44	32	9	24	10	14	31	BPI: Gold
We Love Life	Released: 22 October 2001; Label: Island (ILPS8110); Formats: CD, LP	6	46	36	—	26	41	25	—	46	78	BPI: Silver
More	Released: 6 June 2025; Label: Rough Trade (RT0541LPE); Formats: CD, LP, cassette, digital	1	33	5	15	—	26	9	—	—	7	BPI: Silver
"—" denotes album did not chart in that territory.

=== Compilation albums ===
Title	Album details	Peak chart positions		Certifications
Title	Album details	UK	UK Indie	Certifications
Intro – The Gift Recordings	Released: 4 October 1993; Label: Island (ILPM2076); Formats: CD, LP, cassette	—	23	
Masters of the Universe (Pulp on Fire 1985–86)	Released: 24 June 1994; Label: Fire (FIRELP36); Formats: CD, LP, cassette	—	—	
Countdown 1992–1983	Released: 11 March 1996; Label: Nectar Masters (UK), MCA (US) (NTMLP521); Formats: 2×CD, 2×LP, 2×cassette	10	—	
Pulp Goes to the Disco	Released: 13 July 1998; Label: Connisseur Collection (VSOPCD 26); Format: CD	—	—	
Freshly Squeezed... the Early Years	Released: 1 September 1998; Label: EMI (79737); Format: CD	—	—	
Primal: The Best of the Fire Years 1983–1992	Released: 12 October 1998; Label: Music Collection Int. (MCCD375); Format: CD	—	—	
On Fire	Released: 29 November 1999; Label: Snapper Music (SMCCD 247); Format: 2×CD	—	—	
Hits	Released: 18 November 2002; Label: Universal Island (CID8126); Format: CD	71	—	BPI: Platinum
Pulp It Up	Released: 20 October 2003; Label: Snapper Music (SMDCD463); Format: CD	—	—	

==== Limited releases ====
Year	Album	Notes
2025	Forty Odd Years: Live. Rare. Unreleased. 1982-2025	Compilation of mostly previously unreleased tracks released with June 2025 Mojo magazine.

=== Live albums ===
Title	Album details	Peak chart positions			
Title	Album details	UK	AUT	GER	SWI
The Peel Sessions	Released: 23 October 2006; Label: Universal Island (9841397); Format: 2×CD	—	—	—	—
Party Clowns: Live in London 1991	Released: 12 November 2012; Label: Floating World (FLOATM6180); Formats: CD, digital download	—	—	—	—
Live!	Released: 28 August 2026; Label: Rough Trade; Formats: CD, vinyl, digital download	45	60	70	44

=== Box sets ===
Title	Album details	Notes
Simply Fuss Free	Released: July 1996; Label: Island; Format: 6×CD	Includes the singles "Do You Remember the First Time?", "Common People" ('daytime'), "Mis-Shapes" / "Sorted for E's & Wizz" (both versions) and "Disco 2000" (both versions); Released in Australia only
Pulped: 1983–1992	Released: 31 May 1999; Label: Cooking Vinyl (COOKCD178); Format: 4×CD	Includes the albums It, Freaks, Separations and Masters of the Universe (compilation)

== Singles and EPs ==
Year	Title	Peak chart positions										Certifications	Album
Year	Title	UK	AUS	AUT	FIN	FRA	GER	IRE	NOR	SWE	SWI	Certifications	Album
1983	"My Lighthouse"	—	—	—	—	—	—	—	—	—	—		It
1983	"Everybody's Problem"	—	—	—	—	—	—	—	—	—	—		Non-album singles
1985	"Little Girl (With Blue Eyes)"	—	—	—	—	—	—	—	—	—	—		Non-album singles
1986	"Dogs Are Everywhere"	—	—	—	—	—	—	—	—	—	—		Non-album singles
1987	"They Suffocate at Night"	—	—	—	—	—	—	—	—	—	—		Freaks
1987	"Master of the Universe"	—	—	—	—	—	—	—	—	—	—		Freaks
1991	"My Legendary Girlfriend"	—	—	—	—	—	—	—	—	—	—		Separations
1991	"Countdown"	—	—	—	—	—	—	—	—	—	—		Separations
1992	"O.U. (Gone, Gone)"	133	—	—	—	—	—	—	—	—	—		Non-album singles
1992	"Babies"	111	—	—	—	—	—	—	—	—	—	BPI: Gold	Non-album singles
1993	"Razzmatazz"	80	—	—	—	—	—	—	—	—	—		Non-album singles
1993	"Lipgloss"	50	—	—	—	—	—	—	—	—	—		His 'n' Hers
1994	"Do You Remember the First Time?"	33	—	—	—	—	—	—	—	—	—	BPI: Silver	His 'n' Hers
1994	The Sisters EP ("Babies")	19	197	—	—	—	—	—	—	—	—		His 'n' Hers
1995	"Common People"	2	65	—	—	49	77	9	5	4	42	BPI: 3× Platinum	Different Class
1995	"Sorted for E's & Wizz" / "Mis-Shapes"	2	—	—	15	—	—	6	—	25	—	BPI: Silver	Different Class
1995	"Disco 2000"	7	35	14	9	—	47	13	—	41	—	BPI: Platinum	Different Class
1996	"Something Changed"	10	—	—	—	—	—	30	—	—	—		Different Class
1997	"Help the Aged"	8	85	—	—	—	—	—	—	56	—		This Is Hardcore
1998	"This Is Hardcore"	12	64	—	16	98	—	—	—	—	—		This Is Hardcore
1998	"A Little Soul"	22	—	—	—	—	—	—	—	—	—		This Is Hardcore
1998	"Party Hard"	29	90	—	—	—	—	—	—	—	—		This Is Hardcore
2001	"Sunrise" / "The Trees"	23	—	—	—	—	—	—	—	—	—		We Love Life
2002	"Bad Cover Version"	27	—	—	—	—	—	—	—	—	—		We Love Life
2013	"After You"	101	—	—	—	—	—	—	—	—	—		Non-album single
2025	"Spike Island"	98	—	—	—	—	—	—	—	—	—		More
2025	"Got to Have Love"	—	—	—	—	—	—	—	—	—	—		More
2025	"Tina"	—	—	—	—	—	—	—	—	—	—		More
2025	"The Man Comes Around"	—	—	—	—	—	—	—	—	—	—		The Man Comes Around EP
2026	"Begging for Change"	—	—	—	—	—	—	—	—	—	—		Help(2)
2026	"Disco 2000 (Live)"	—	—	—	—	—	—	—	—	—	—		Liveǃ
2026	" A Sunset (Live)"	—	—	—	—	—	—	—	—	—	—		Liveǃ
"—" denotes a release that did not chart or was not issued in that region.

== Other appearances ==
List of non-single songs by Pulp from non-Pulp releases, showing year released and album name
Title	Year	Album
"What Do You Say?"	1982	Your Secret's Safe with Us
"Whiskey in the Jar"	1996	Childline
"Mile End"	1996	Trainspotting: Music from the Motion Picture
"All Time High"	1997	Shaken and Stirred: The David Arnold James Bond Project
"Like a Friend"	1998	Great Expectations: The Album
"Le Roi des Fourmis"	1999	A Tribute to Polnaref
"Born to Cry"	1999	Notting Hill: Music from the Motion Picture
"My Body May Die"	2000	Randall & Hopkirk (Deceased): The Soundtrack
"Grandfather's Nursery"^{[A]}	2005	100% Sinnamon
"Party Hard" (Christopher Just Mix)	2008	Dirty Sanchez

- A "Grandfather's Nursery" was also released as a free download track by Amazon.com in 2002.

List of appearances by Pulp on various artists’ compilations, showing year released and album name
Year	Album	Track(s)
1996	Evening Session: Priority Tunes	Includes Pulp performance of the song "Babies"
1996	...Later Volume One: Brit Beat	Includes a live version of the song "I Spy"
1997	Long Live Tibet	Includes a live version of the song "Live Bed Show"
1999	The Glastonbury Broadcasts Vol 1	Includes a live version of "Sorted for E's & Wizz" from Glastonbury '98
2001	NME Exclusives!	Includes a live version of the song "Party Hard" from 2001
2002	4 Scott	Scott Piering tribute album includes live performance of the songs "Babies" and "Sunrise"
2014	Britpop at the BBC	Includes Pulp performance of the song "Lipgloss"

== Video ==
=== Video albums ===
Year	Video details	Certifications
Sorted for Films & Vids	Released: November 1995; Label: Polygram Video; Format: VHS	BPI: Gold
F.E.E.L.I.N.G.C.A.L.L.E.D.L.I.V.E	Released: October 1996; Label: Polygram Video; Format: VHS	
The Park Is Mine	Released: November 1998; Label: Polygram Video; Format: VHS	
Hits	Released: 9 December 2002; Label: Island Universal (0634169); Format: DVD	
Ultimate Live	Released: 20 June 2005; Label: Universal (LC01846 / 0602498296165 ); Format: DVD	
Pulp: A Film About Life, Death And Supermarkets	Released: 9 March 2014; Label: Soda Pictures; Format: Clu + Blu-ray + DVD and PAL	

=== Music videos ===
Year	Title	Director(s)
1985	"Manon"	James Eaton and Simon Hinkler
1986	"They Suffocate at Night"	Michael Geoghegan
1991	"My Legendary Girlfriend"	Martin Wallace and Jarvis Cocker
1991	"Countdown"	Martin Wallace and Jarvis Cocker
1992	"Babies" (original version)	Martin Wallace and Jarvis Cocker
1993	"Razzmatazz"	Martin Wallace and Jarvis Cocker
1993	"Lipgloss"	Martin Wallace and Jarvis Cocker
1994	"Do You Remember the First Time?"	Pedro Romhanyi
1994	"Babies" (1994 version)	Pedro Romhanyi
1995	"Common People"	Pedro Romhanyi
1995	"Mis-Shapes"	Pedro Romhanyi
1995	"Sorted For E's & Wizz"	
1995	"Disco 2000"	Pedro Romhanyi
1995	"Something Changed"	Pedro Romhanyi
1997	"Help the Aged"	Hammer & Tongs
1998	"This Is Hardcore"	Doug Nichol
1998	"A Little Soul"	Hammer & Tongs
1998	"Party Hard"	Mike Mills
2001	"The Trees"	Phil Harder
2001	"Bad Cover Version"	Martin Wallace and Jarvis Cocker
2025	"Spike Island"	Jarvis Cocker
2025	"Got to Have Love"	Jarvis Cocker
2025	"Tina"	Julia Schimautz
