= Countdown 1992–1983 =

Compilation album by Pulp
- Released: 11 March 1996
- Recorded: 1983–1992
- Genre: Alternative rock
- Length: 96:10
- Label: Nectar Masters (UK); MCA (US)

Pulp chronology
Different Class (1995)	Countdown 1992–1983 (1996)	This Is Hardcore (1998)

Countdown 1992–1983 is a double compilation album by the band Pulp released by compilation specialist Nectar Masters on 11 March 1996.

== Background ==
It features highlights from the band's first three albums (It, Freaks and Separations), along with non-album singles ("Little Girl (With Blue Eyes)" and "Dogs Are Everywhere") and B-sides ("Death Goes to the Disco", "The Mark Of The Devil", "97 Lovers" and "Blue Glow"). The album title is a reference to the band's song "Countdown", therefore (aside from the extended version of "Countdown" which closes the album) the running order goes backwards chronologically from 1992 to 1983.

Being released at the height of Pulp's and Britpop fame, the album reached #10 in the UK Album Chart, the only charting compilation album of the band's Fire Records era material. The sleevenotes are written by Guardian journalist Caroline Sullivan, a longtime friend of the band, and detail the group's history, particularly prior to their main commercial success.

== Reception ==
Professional ratings
Review scores
Source	Rating
AllMusic	4/5 stars
Pitchfork	6.2/10
Smash Hits	4/5 stars

Although it was well received by critics and fans, Jarvis Cocker was very critical of the compilation at the time of its release. Cocker: "I would urge anybody not to buy it. Please, I find it embarrassing to be honest. And also the way it's packaged to look a bit modern, a bit like our sleeves now. It's a crap version... I wouldn't recommend it to anybody. And Fire records never did us any favours when we were on the label. Being signed to that label was the single biggest thing that prevented us succeeding. It almost made us split up."

== Track listing ==
All lyrics written by Jarvis Cocker, all music composed by Pulp; except where noted.

Disc one

1. "Countdown" (Single Version) – 4:40
2. "Death Goes to the Disco" – 5:42
3. "My Legendary Girlfriend" – 6:44
4. "Don't You Want Me Anymore?" – 3:46
5. "She's Dead" – 5:04
6. "Down by the River" – 3:38
7. "I Want You" – 4:38
8. "Being Followed Home" – 6:01
9. "Master of the Universe" – 3:19
10. "Don't You Know" – 4:06
11. "They Suffocate at Night" – 6:17
- Tracks 1–2 from the 1991 single "Countdown"
- Tracks 3–6 from the 1992 album Separations
- Tracks 7–11 from the 1987 album Freaks

Disc two

1. "Dogs Are Everywhere" – 4:53
2. "The Mark of the Devil" – 4:32
3. "97 Lovers" – 4:28
4. "Little Girl (With Blue Eyes)" – 3:25
5. "Blue Glow" – 3:03
6. "My Lighthouse" (Jarvis Cocker, Simon Hinkler) – 3:28
7. "Wishful Thinking" (Cocker) – 4:16
8. "Blue Girls" (Cocker) – 5:58
9. "Countdown" (Extended Version) – 8:03
- Tracks 1–3 from the 1986 single "Dogs Are Everywhere"
- Tracks 4–5 from the single 1985 "Little Girl (With Blue Eyes)"
- Tracks 6–8 from the 1983 album It
- Track 9 from the 1991 single "Countdown"
- Vinyl copies have five tracks on each side in the same order, except that "Death Goes to the Disco" appears on side four between "Blue Girls" and "Countdown" (Extended Version).

== Charts ==
Chart (1996)	Peak position
Scottish Albums (OCC)	22
UK Albums (OCC)	10
