= Freshly Squeezed... the Early Years =

Compilation album by Pulp
- Released: 1 September 1998
- Recorded: 1983 – 1992
- Genre: Indie pop
- Label: Velvel Music Group

Pulp chronology
This Is Hardcore (1998)	Freshly Squeezed... the Early Years (1998)	We Love Life (2001)

Professional ratings
Review scores
Source	Rating
Allmusic	4/5 stars

Freshly Squeezed... the Early Years is a semi-official compilation of the English rock band Pulp's early material recorded from 1983 to 1992 and originally released on the London independent label Fire. It was released in North America only.

== Track listing ==
All songs written by Pulp, except "My Lighthouse" written by Jarvis Cocker and Simon Hinkler.

1. "My Lighthouse" – 3:28
2. "My Legendary Girlfriend" – 6:48
3. "Don't You Want Me Anymore?" – 3:47
4. "She's Dead" – 5:05
5. "Little Girl (With Blue Eyes)" – 3:26
6. "Down by the River" – 3:38
7. "Blue Glow" – 3:04
8. "I Want You" – 4:41
9. "They Suffocate at Night" – 6:18
10. "Master of the Universe" – 3:20
11. "Countdown" (single version) – 4:39
