= Spike Island (song) =

2025 single by Pulp

Single by Pulp

from the album More
- Released: 10 April 2025
- Recorded: 2024
- Studio: Orbb
- Genre: Rock; indie rock; post-punk
- Length: 4:42
- Label: Rough Trade Records
- Producer: James Ford

Pulp singles chronology
"After You" (2013)	"Spike Island" (2025)	"Got to Have Love" (2025)

"Spike Island" is a song by English rock band Pulp. It was released on 10 April 2025 through Rough Trade Records. Produced by James Ford, it marked the first new music from the band in 12 years. It preceded More, the band's first new album in 24 years.

The song was released alongside a music video made using a text-to-video model. Frontman Jarvis Cocker attempted to animate the photography from 1995's Different Class using the model, before constructing a video out of its hallucinations. The lyrics are self-reverent and nostalgic for the Spike Island concert of 1990.

The song was met with critical acclaim, with most critics noting it as a triumphant return for the band. A 7" with the song and a bonus track, "Open Strings", was released on 23 May.

== Background ==
Pulp are a British rock band made up of Jarvis Cocker, Candida Doyle, Nick Banks and Mark Webber. The band also consisted of Steve Mackey, who died in 2023. After releasing albums such as It, Freaks and Separations which all failed to gain commercial traction, 1994's His 'n' Hers proved to be their breakthrough into the mainstream. Their future albums would see further success, such as Different Class and This is Hardcore. After the release of We Love Life, the band would quietly disband, only coming back for a few reunion tours in 2011 and 2023.

== Music and lyrics ==
"Spike Island" has been described as rock, indie rock and post-punk. The song is a "mid-tempo track that opens with disco bass, a steady drum groove and a sliding guitar line". Alexis Petridis of The Guardian noted the song's disco influences throughout. It begins with a "high-pitched whistle, a cymbal count-in, then erupts into glorious, technicolour Pulp". The song's lyrics discuss the disbandment of Pulp, Cocker's discomforts with fame and his optimism towards the band's second reunion. The title and main lyric of the song were derived from a 1990 concert of the same name organised by the Stone Roses.

== Music video ==
A screencap of the music video for "Spike Island"; Cocker allowed the text-to-video model to run freely, creating hallucinations and nonsensical imagery, as shown.

The music video for the song was released on 10 April. Julian House assisted in post-production. Cocker took images of cardboard cutouts of the band derived from 1995's Different Class and animated them with assistance from a text-to-video model. After getting approval from photographers Donald Milne and Rankin to use the images, Cocker originally wanted to make a video showing how the photos were taken, before realising the limitations of AI would prevent this. Afterwards, he wanted to "see where the computer led [him]".

According to Cocker, all of the clips seen in the music video were a result of him typing in prompts to animate the images, such as "the black & white figure remains still whilst the bus in the background drives off". Rather than delivering the result, the model would hallucinate, leading to results such as "the coach weirdly [sliding] towards the cut-out of [Cocker]". He also noted his preference for "human intelligence" over artificial intelligence. Tom Breihan of Stereogum called the video "extremely funny" and said its "results are nightmarish, and they effectively skewer the entire concept of the AI music video".

== Release ==
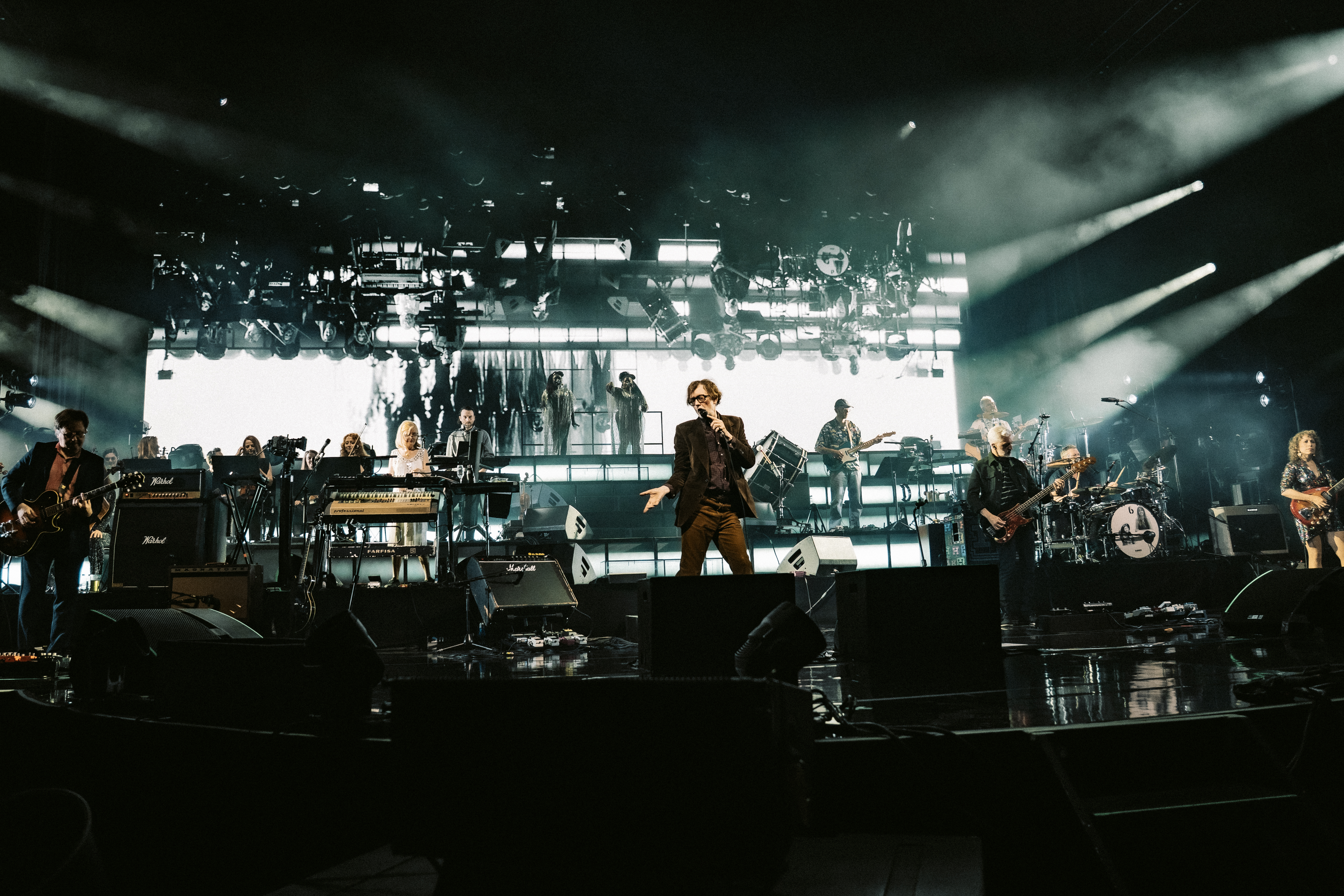
Pulp performing live on 13 June 2025 at the O2 Arena.

Throughout 2023 and 2024, Pulp would play a variety of new songs across their reunion tours. In a press release shared 12 December 2024, the band announced they had signed a record deal with Rough Trade Records. A new album featuring songs from their recent tours was rumoured to be released in 2025.

On 10 April 2025, Pulp's eighth album, More, was officially announced, with "Spike Island" and its music video being released alongside. More marked the band's first album in 24 years, while "Spike Island" marked the band's first new music in 12 years. The band would perform the song live on the Jonathan Ross Show on 12 April. On 6 May, it was announced "Spike Island" would be pressed onto a 7" single alongside a B-side recorded in the same sessions as More, "Open Strings".

== Reception ==
Professional ratings
Review scores
Source	Rating
Clash	8/10
The Guardian	4/5 stars

"Spike Island" received critical acclaim upon release. In a review for Clash, Richard Bowes wrote the track "perfectly balances nostalgia and hope", which was "always [one of] Pulp's strengths". Alexis Petridis of The Guardian called the song a "noticeably stronger song than "After You"" and that if it was released during the band's peak, "it would doubtless have been a hit". Under the Radar ranked the song at No. 1 on a list of their top songs of the week. The Telegraph's James Hall called the song a "sunny, festival-ready anthem that instantly reminds you how much you've missed the idiosyncratic Sheffield band".

Writing for NME, Andrew Trendell called the song a "synth-led indie pop gem". Rob Hakimian of Beats Per Minute called the song a "synthy wonder". The song would reach No. 98 on the UK Singles Chart and No. 8 on the UK Singles Downloads Chart. It would also reach No. 26 on the Billboard Adult Alternative Airplay Chart, marking the first time the band charted on any airplay chart in the United States.

== Track listing ==
Streaming and digital release
No.	Title	Length
1.	"Spike Island"	4:42
Total length:		4:42

7" track listing
No.	Title	Length
1.	"Spike Island"	4:42
2.	"Open Strings"	4:10
Total length:		8:52

== Personnel ==
Credits adapted from the liner notes of More.

=== Pulp ===
- Jarvis Cocker – vocals, slide guitar
- Jason Buckle – electronics, music
- Candida Doyle – electric organ
- Mark Webber – guitar
- Nick Banks – drums
- Emma Smith – violin, backing vocals
- Andrew McKinney – bass
- Adam Betts – electronic drums
- Rich Jones – viola
- Jennymay Logan – violin
- Laura Moody – cello

=== Production ===
- James Ford – production
- Animesh Raval – engineering and mixing
- Matt Colton – mastering

== Charts ==
Chart performance for Spike Island
Chart (2025)	Peak position
US Adult Alternative Airplay (Billboard)	26
UK Singles (Official Charts)	98
UK Singles Downloads (Official Charts)	8
