= Here Comes More Tour =

2025–26 concert tour by Pulp

Here Comes More
- Tour by Pulp
- Location: Europe; North America; Oceania; South America
- Associated album: More
- Start date: 7 June 2025
- End date: 28 August 2026
- Legs: 5
- No. of shows: 35

The Here Comes More Tour (known as the You Deserve More Tour for its first leg) is a headlining concert tour from English rock band Pulp. The tour began on 7 June 2025 in Glasgow, Scotland and will end on 28 August 2026 at Wythenshawe Park in Manchester. The tour was announced in three phases: the first leg of the tour covering the UK and Ireland, the second covering the United States and Canada, and the third covering Australia and New Zealand.

== Background ==
In 2025, Pulp released their eighth full-length album titled More, the band's first record in 24 years. Upon release, the album received critical acclaim, including getting nominated for a Mercury Prize. When the album was announced, the band announced a tour in support of it, initially covering just the United Kingdom and a single date in Ireland. In April, the band announced dates for the United States and Canada. Then in November, the band announced several dates in Australia and one in New Zealand.

== Critical reception ==
Reviews for the Here Comes More/You Deserve More tour were overwhelmingly positive. Writing for ParklifeDC, Kyle Gustafson referred to the show in DC as "triumphant", and stated:

Last year I said 'Jarvis Cocker is undoubtedly the best frontman from the Britpop Era, and I don't think it's even close,' and I stand by it. After the weekend I just had, I feel extremely qualified to back up my assertion. Jarvis is the best combo of singer, songwriter, entertainer, and MC. He easily connects with the crowd and does an amazing job ushering his band and crowd through the show.

Writing for the BrooklynVegan, Bill Pearis simply said of the New York show "What a perfect night". Review's of the band's shows in the UK were similarly laudatory. Writing for Silence and Sound, Katie Hillier said of a show at the O2 Arena:

Jarvis Cocker is every bit the perfect frontman. Each song is introduced with a little anecdote, the next number teased, whether it be a question as to whether anyone's been shopping today (Farmer's Market) or a chat about the previous night at the O2 (Do You Remember The First Time?), or simply a statement that we'll carry on with the theme of afternoons (Acrylic Afternoons). Between songs, Cocker reaches into his blazer pockets, bizarrely throwing grapes and sweets into the audience, and later asking everyone to hype him up as he attempts to catch a grape in his mouth (he misses, dusts it off, then eats it anyway). He's a true showman.

== Live album and concert film ==
On June 16th 2026, it was announced that the band would be releasing a concert film entitled "Pulp: What Do You Do For An Encore" and a live album simply entitled "LIVE!". Both of these will cover the band's time at the O2 Arena on this tour.

== Setlist ==
This set list is representative of the performance on 4 September 2025 at the Tabernacle in Atlanta. It does not represent the set list at all concerts for the duration of the tour.

1. "Sorted for E's & Wizz"
2. "Disco 2000"
3. "Spike Island"
4. "F.E.E.L.I.N.G.C.A.L.L.E.D.L.O.V.E."
5. "My Sex"
6. "Farmers Market"
7. "This Is Hardcore"
8. "Something Changed"
9. "O.U. (Gone, Gone)"
10. "Acrylic Afternoons"
11. "Do You Remember the First Time?"
12. "Mis-Shapes"
13. "Got to Have Love"
14. "Common People"

Encore

15. "The Fear"
16. "Lipgloss"
17. "Help the Aged"
18. "Like a Friend"
19. "A Sunset"

== Tour dates ==
List of 2025 concerts
Date	City	Country	Venue
7 June 2025	Glasgow	Scotland	The OVO Hydro
10 June 2025	Dublin	Ireland	3Arena
13 June 2025	London	England	The O2 Arena
14 June 2025	London	England	The O2 Arena
19 June 2025	Birmingham	England	Utilita Arena Birmingham
21 June 2025	Manchester	England	Co-op Live
10 July 2025	Bilbao	Spain	Bilbao BBK Live
14 July 2025	Montreaux	Switzerland	Montreaux Jazz Festival
25 July 2025	Sheffield	England	Tramlines Festival
2 August 2025	Incheon	South Korea	Pentaport Rock Festival
15 August 2025	Saint-Malo	France	La Route du Rock
4 September 2025	Atlanta	United States	Tabernacle
6 September 2025	Washington, D.C.	United States	The Anthem
9 September 2025	Philadelphia	United States	The Met
11 September 2025	Queens	United States	Forest Hills Stadium
13 September 2025	Boston	United States	Suffolk Downs
16 September 2025	Toronto	Canada	Budweiser Stage
17 September 2025	Detroit	United States	Detroit Masonic Temple
20 September 2025	Minneapolis	United States	Minneapolis Armory
22 September 2025	Denver	United States	Red Rocks Amphitheatre
25 September 2025	Los Angeles	United States	Hollywood Bowl
26 September 2025	Los Angeles	United States	Hollywood Bowl

List of 2026 concerts
Date	City	Country	Venue
21 February 2026	Auckland	New Zealand	Spark Arena
24 February 2026	Brisbane	Australia	Riverstage
27 February 2026	Adelaide	Australia	Adelaide Festival
3 March 2026	Melbourne	Australia	Sidney Myer Music Bowl
6 March 2026	Sydney	Australia	Sydney Opera House
7 March 2026	Sydney	Australia	Sydney Opera House
2 June 2026	Mexico City	Mexico	Palacio de los Deportes
8 June 2026	Santiago	Chile	Movistar Arena
12 June 2026	Buenos Aires	Argentina	Movistar Arena
27 June 2026	Berlin	Germany	Tempodrom
29 June 2026	Cologne	Germany	Palladium
2 July 2026	Hérouville-Saint-Clair	France	Festival Beauregard 2026
4 July 2026	Lac de Malsaucy	France	Eurockéennes
11 July 2026	Madrid	Spain	Mad Cool Festival
28 August 2026	Manchester	England	Wythenshawe Park

== Cancelled shows ==
List of cancelled concerts
Date (2026)	City	Country	Venue	Reason
6 June	Bogotá	Colombia	Movistar Arena	Logistic and production issues
