= F.E.E.L.I.N.G.C.A.L.L.E.D.L.I.V.E =

Video by Pulp
- Released: October 1996
- Genre: Britpop
- Length: 103 mins

F.E.E.L.I.N.G.C.A.L.L.E.D.L.I.V.E is a live concert video released by Pulp in October 1996, following the success of their album Different Class. The title is a reference to the band's song "F.E.E.L.I.N.G.C.A.L.L.E.D.L.O.V.E". The whole concert was later included on the Ultimate Live DVD.

== Track listing ==
1. "Do You Remember the First Time?"
2. "Monday Morning"
3. "Pencil Skirt"
4. "I Spy"
5. "Sorted for E's & Wizz"
6. "Something Changed"
7. "Live Bed Show"
8. "Acrylic Afternoons"
9. "Babies"
10. "Disco 2000"
11. "Mis-Shapes"
12. "F.E.E.L.I.N.G.C.A.L.L.E.D.L.O.V.E"
13. "Underwear"
14. "Common People"

== Sources ==
- AcrylicAfternoons
- "Truth and Beauty: the Story of Pulp" by Mark Sturdy (Omnibus Press)
