= The Park Is Mine =

The Park Is Mine may refer to

- The Park Is Mine (novel), a 1981 novel by Stephen Peters (ISBN 978-0385159531)
- The Park Is Mine (1985 film), based on the novel and starring Tommy Lee Jones and Helen Shaver
  - The Park Is Mine, the soundtrack album to the film, composed by Tangerine Dream
- The Park Is Mine (Pulp video), a 1998 live video by the band Pulp
