= After You (Pulp song) =

Single by Pulp
- Released: 28 January 2013
- Recorded: 2012
- Genre: Post-Britpop; alternative rock
- Length: 5:35
- Label: Rough Trade
- Songwriter: Pulp
- Producer: James Murphy

Pulp singles chronology
"Bad Cover Version" (2002)	"After You" (2013)	"Spike Island" (2025)

Alternate cover
- 12" edition cover

"After You" is a song by British band Pulp released as a single in January 2013, the first new single by the band in eleven years.

== Background ==
The song had been originally demoed during early sessions to We Love Life, the band's seventh studio album and last until the release of their eighth album More 24 years later. The song wasn't finished and remained unreleased like several other songs from that period. Pulp finally went back to finish the song in late 2012 during their successful comeback 2011–2012 tour.

== Release ==
"After You" was originally released as free download for those who received a Christmas card at Pulp's hometown show at the Motorpoint Arena on 8 December 2012. The card contained a unique code to give access to a downloadable gift, which was made available after midnight on Christmas Eve. The song finally received a commercial release in January 2013, in a form of download single.

The band performed "After You" on The Jonathan Ross Show on 9 February 2013.

The song was remixed by Soulwax and released on 12" vinyl especially for the 2013 Record Store Day.

== Uses on other media ==
The Soulwax remix of "After You" was featured in the video game Grand Theft Auto V on the game's radio station Soulwax FM.

== Personnel ==
- Jarvis Cocker – lead vocals
- James Murphy – percussion, handclaps, backing vocals
- Candida Doyle – synthesizers
- Mark Webber – electric and acoustic guitars
- Steve Mackey – bass guitar
- Nick Banks – drums

== Track listing ==
Digital download

1. "After You" – 5:35

12" (RTRADST699)

1. "After You" (Soulwax remix)
2. "After You" (original version)
3. "After You" (The 4am Desperation Disco to Disco dub version)

== Chart positions ==
Chart (2013)	Peak position
UK Singles Chart	101
UK Indie Chart	10
