= Everybody's Problem =

Single by Pulp
- B-side: "There Was..."
- Released: 19 September 1983
- Recorded: 4–5 June 1983, at Southern Studios, London
- Genre: Indie pop
- Length: 3:13
- Label: Red Rhino
- Songwriter(s): Jarvis Cocker
- Producer(s): Simon Hinkler

Pulp singles chronology
"My Lighthouse" (1983)	"Everybody's Problem" (1983)	"Little Girl (With Blue Eyes)" (1985)

"Everybody's Problem" is the second single by English alternative rock band Pulp, released in 1983.

== History ==
"Everybody's Problem"/"There Was" was a follow-up single to the band's debut album and demonstrated a style shift advised by Red Rhino's Tony Perrin who had convinced Cocker that he "could write commercial songs like Wham!". However, the single failed to achieve any success at that time with Jarvis Cocker becoming unhappy with his chosen musical direction, which later led to various lineup changes and the establishment of a new, more experimental, artier and noisier direction for Pulp.

== Release ==
Neither "Everybody's Problem" or "There Was" featured on the original release of the first album It. However, both were later included as bonus tracks on the deleted CD reissue of the album in 1994 by Cherry Red. Since then, Cherry Red re-released "Everybody's Problem" with and without "There Was..." on various compilation albums, most recently on their 2013 box set Scared to Get Happy: A Story of Indie-Pop 1980-1989. The original single is now a collector's item.

== Track listing ==
1. "Everybody's Problem" – 3:13
2. "There Was..." – 3:31
