= Sunrise (Pulp song) =

Single by Pulp

from the album We Love Life
- A-side: "The Trees"
- Released: 8 October 2001
- Genre: Britpop, alternative rock
- Length: 5:53
- Label: Island
- Producer(s): Scott Walker

Pulp singles chronology
"Party Hard" (1998)	"Sunrise" / "The Trees" (2001)	"Bad Cover Version" (2002)

"Sunrise" is a song by British rock band Pulp, from their 2001 album We Love Life. It was released as a double-A single with "The Trees" on 8 October 2001 ahead of the album, charting at #23 in the UK Singles Chart. "Sunrise" is also used in the award-winning BBC animated satirical comedy sketch show Monkey Dust.

== Background ==
"Sunrise" was one of the first songs written for We Love Life and was debuted at the 2000 Reading Festival. Cocker explained of the song's meaning:

They say the darkest hour is just before the dawn, don't they? ... I always hate it when you've been at an all-night party and then suddenly the sun starts coming up and you think, 'Why didn't I go home an hour ago?' You feel unnatural because every other creature's just waking up and the birds start doing the dawn chorus ... So on a simple level the song's about trying to react to the sunrise in a better way.

== Release ==
"Sunrise" was the favorite of the band to be We Love Life's first single, due to its having a "life of its own" and "a real vibe," according to Island Records' Nigel Coxon. In the end, the song was released as a double-A side with "The Trees" at the insistence of the record company. Coxon explained, "'Sunrise' seemed to have a momentum of its own, but no one in the record company... got it. We all thought it was brilliant and it should be a single... but the record company, being very timid possibly, thought, 'Sunrise', six minutes, two-minute outro, no chance." As a compromise, the two songs were released as a double-A side, which meant, according to Coxon, that "that single got slightly diluted". The single reached number 23 in the UK, a relative disappointment for the band.

The Fat Truckers remix of "Sunrise" is notable for removing the instrumentation from the original recording and using loops and quick-cuts of Jarvis Cocker sighing and breathing heavily to replace it.

== Track listings ==
CD one
No.	Title	Writer(s)	Length
1.	"Sunrise"	Nick Banks, Jarvis Cocker, Candida Doyle, Steve Mackey, Mark Webber, Peter Mansell	5:53
2.	"The Trees"	Banks, Cocker, Doyle, Mackey, Webber	4:51
3.	"Sunrise" (Fat Truckers/Scott Free Mix)	Banks, Cocker, Doyle, Mackey, Webber, Mansell	4:07

CD two
No.	Title	Writer(s)	Length
1.	"The Trees"	Banks, Cocker, Doyle, Mackey, Webber	4:51
2.	"Sunrise"	Banks, Cocker, Doyle, Mackey, Webber, Mansell	5:53
3.	"The Trees" (Felled by I Monster)	Banks, Cocker, Doyle, Mackey, Webber	5:27

12"
No.	Title	Writer(s)	Length
1.	"Sunrise" (All Seeing I - Middle of the Road Mix)	Banks, Cocker, Doyle, Mackey, Webber, Mansell	6:08
2.	"The Trees" (Felled by I Monster)	Banks, Cocker, Doyle, Mackey, Webber	5:27
3.	"The Trees" (Lovejoy the No Jazz Mix)	Banks, Cocker, Doyle, Mackey, Webber	4:47
