= Bad Cover Version =

Single by Pulp

from the album We Love Life
- Released: 15 April 2002
- Recorded: 2000–01
- Genre: Britpop
- Length: 4:10 / 3:58
- Label: Island
- Songwriters: Nick Banks, Jarvis Cocker, Candida Doyle, Steve Mackey and Mark Webber
- Producers: Scott Walker, Chris Thomas

Pulp singles chronology
"Sunrise"/ "The Trees" (2001)	"Bad Cover Version" (2002)	"After You" (2013)

"Bad Cover Version" is a song by British rock band Pulp, from their 2001 album We Love Life. It was released 15 April 2002 as the second single from the album, charting at number 27 in the UK Singles Chart. It was the band's last single before their eight-year hiatus, which ended in 2011. CD1's B-sides appear as bonus tracks on the US release of We Love Life. The B-sides to CD2 are cover versions of Pulp songs performed by other artists.

== Background ==
"Bad Cover Version" began as an instrumental written by Pulp keyboardist Candida Doyle. Cocker then added lyrics; he recalled, "I wrote the words at night, then went to bed, woke up in the morning and thought 'I bet they're really shit, them words.' But then when I sang them they worked out alright". Cocker later called it "just a pop song" but said that he felt it was "quite emotional." The song's working title was "Candy's Spectre."

== Lyrics ==
The song details the protagonist's belief that his former partner's current relationship is inferior to what she had with him. The latter part of the song is a list of things the narrator likens said relationship to, including The Rolling Stones since the 1980s, the TV adaptation of Planet of the Apes, and later episodes of Tom and Jerry where Tom and Jerry could talk.

Most notable is the reference to "the second side of 'Til the Band Comes In", a 1970 album by Scott Walker who produced "Bad Cover Version", along with the rest of the We Love Life album. 'Til the Band Comes In contains original songs on side 1, and mostly cover songs on side 2; Cocker explained, "That record's always mystified me... It's like he just kind of gets sick of the whole thing and gives up halfway through the record." Jarvis Cocker stated that the lyrics were written before he knew that Walker would be involved. He recalled,

Of course, when we were working with him, this became a problem for me because I felt that I had to mention it to him. ... [I] just kind of blurted it all out. 'Er, Scott, well, I've just got to apologise for something, because, OK, at the end of the song, like I make a reference to 'Til The Band Comes In, right, in a list of crap things' ... and at first he just looked at me in a very mystified way, like, 'What is this nutter ranting on about?' And then it kind of clicked with him what I was on about, and he said, 'Well gee thanks guys, that's the way you repay me!' ... for me, it was embarrassing.

== Release ==
According to Island Records' Nigel Coxon, there was "big debate" over whether to release another single from We Love Life, given the relative under-performance of previous single "Sunrise"/"The Trees". He explained, "[The record company] wants new stuff, to be fed new hits, all the time. It's just this overriding idea that Pulp are an old has-been". Pulp did convince Island to release one more single, but the dispute resulted in a late release of April 2002.

In addition to non-album tracks "Yesterday" and "Forever in My Dreams", the single release featured on its B-side two covers of Pulp songs: Nick Cave's version of "Disco 2000" and Róisín Murphy's version of "Sorted for E's & Wizz". The single reached number 27 in the UK.

The cover for the single is similar to the cover of the David Bowie album The Rise and Fall of Ziggy Stardust and the Spiders from Mars. The child on the cover is Pulp's guitarist Mark Webber.

== Video ==
The song's video features many celebrity lookalikes who gather in a West London studio to perform a "tribute" to Pulp, in a similar style to the video for Band Aid's "Do They Know It's Christmas?". All the lookalikes appear to perform their own lines in the style of the artists they are impersonating, with the exception of the Jarvis Cocker lookalike, who is miming to Cocker's vocal. Cocker himself appears in the video dressed as Brian May, playing the guitar note that ends the song. Kurt Cobain, who died in 1994, is the only impersonated artist who was not alive at the time of the song's release.

The list of impersonated artists

Singers:

- Robbie Williams
- Liam Gallagher
- Kylie Minogue
- David Bowie
- George Michael
- Bono
- Paul McCartney
- Craig David
- Jennifer Lopez
- Sophie Ellis-Bextor
- Tom Jones
- Björk
- Kurt Cobain
- Rod Stewart
- Meat Loaf
- Cher
- Jay Kay
- Jarvis Cocker
- Mick Jagger
- Elton John
- Missy Elliott
- Bob Geldof

Guitarists:

- Noel Gallagher
- Paul McCartney
- Keith Richards
- Brian May

Percussionists:

- Phil Collins
- Gary Numan

Producers:

- Jeff Lynne
- Scott Walker

== Track listings ==
All lyrics are written by Jarvis Cocker; all music is composed by Nick Banks, Jarvis Cocker, Candida Doyle, Steve Mackey and Mark Webber; except where indicated.

CD one
No.	Title	Length
1.	"Bad Cover Version" (album version)	4:10
2.	"Yesterday"	3:51
3.	"Forever in My Dreams"	4:23

CD two
No.	Title	Writer(s)	Length
1.	"Bad Cover Version" (video version)		3:58
2.	"Disco 2000" (Nick Cave version)	Banks, Cocker, Doyle, Mackey, Russell Senior, Webber	5:20
3.	"Sorted" (Róisín Murphy version)	Banks, Cocker, Doyle, Mackey, Senior, Webber	6:10

DVD
No.	Title	Length
1.	"Bad Cover Version" (album version) (audio)
2.	"Bad Cover Version" (video)
3.	"Making the Video" (video)

== Personnel ==
- Jarvis Cocker - lead vocals, electric guitars
- Mark Webber - acoustic guitar, backing vocals
- Candida Doyle - keyboards, backing vocals
- Steve Mackey - bass, backing vocals
- Nick Banks - drums, bells, backing vocals
- Scott Walker - backing vocals
