= The Trees (Pulp song) =

Single by Pulp

from the album We Love Life
- A-side: "Sunrise"
- Released: 8 October 2001
- Genre: Britpop, alternative rock
- Length: 4:51
- Label: Island
- Producer(s): Scott Walker

Pulp singles chronology
"Party Hard" (1998)	"Sunrise" / "The Trees" (2001)	"Bad Cover Version" (2002)

"The Trees" is a song by British rock band Pulp, from their 2001 album We Love Life. Featuring a string sample from the Otley soundtrack song "Tell Her You Love Her," "The Trees" explores what Cocker describes as the "impassivity" of trees to witnessing the "drama" that can occur in the woods.

As a compromise with the band's record label, "The Trees" was released as a double-A side with Pulp's preferred single choice, "Sunrise", on 8 October 2001. The single charted at number 23 in the UK Singles Chart. Though commercially less successful than many of the band's previous singles, "The Trees" has since seen a positive critical reception and has been named by Pulp bassist Steve Mackey as the song that "encapsulates" We Love Life. The music video was directed by Phil Harder.

== Background ==
"The Trees" samples the string arrangement from "Tell Her You Love Her," written by Stanley Myers and Hal Shaper. The song had appeared in the film Otley, which Cocker had sought to use in a song since 1999. Earlier songs that were attempted with the string arrangement included "Cockroach Conversation" and "Otley" before being reworked into "The Trees" at the tail end of the We Love Life sessions. Cocker recalled:

The idea of the lyrics in that song is the trees being there and all the kind of human dramas that could happen in a forest, people meeting for an illicit love affair or whatever, but the trees are impassive to that, and the way that people will carve their name on the bark of tree, thinking that's some kind of mark of permanence in a relationship, but then you go back a year or two later and try and read it, it'll be all twisted.

In reference to the song's first line, Cocker stated, "I'd like to point out that I've never shot an animal with an air rifle! There was an air pistol at my granny's when I was growing up and I was allowed to play with it without any pellets in it. As soon as I got to an age where I might have wanted to go out and shoot creatures, it was hidden. So I've never shot even a magpie..."

Bassist Steve Mackey of the song stated that the track "encapsulates" We Love Life, pointing to the fact that it was "the last song we wrote, and by that point we were starting to understand what kind of record we were making".

== Release ==
"The Trees" was released as a double-A side with "Sunrise" at the insistence of the record company. Island Records' Nigel Coxon explained, "We all thought ['Sunrise'] was brilliant and it should be a single... but the record company, being very timid possibly, thought, 'Sunrise', six minutes, two-minute outro, no chance. 'Trees', that's more obvious'." As a compromise, the two songs were released as a double-A side, which meant, according to Coxon, that "that single got slightly diluted". The single reached number 23 in the UK, a relative disappointment for the band.

== Reception ==
Since its release, "The Trees" has seen positive critical reception from music writers. Pitchfork named the song as "of the best traditional songs that Pulp have ever written" and praised the song's "brilliant string ostinato". Blender wrote that the song's melody was "glorious", while Entertainment Weekly lauded the song's "bustling, beautiful strings." The A.V. Club noted the song as one of the moments on We Love Life that "help[ed] balance the recitations with catchy moments, an ingredient the nonetheless expert Hardcore tended to forget."

== Track listings ==
CD one
No.	Title	Writer(s)	Length
1.	"Sunrise"	Nick Banks, Jarvis Cocker, Candida Doyle, Steve Mackey, Mark Webber, Peter Mansell	5:53
2.	"The Trees"	Banks, Cocker, Doyle, Mackey, Webber	4:51
3.	"Sunrise" (Fat Truckers/Scott Free Mix)	Banks, Cocker, Doyle, Mackey, Webber, Mansell	4:07

CD two
No.	Title	Writer(s)	Length
1.	"The Trees"	Banks, Cocker, Doyle, Mackey, Webber	4:51
2.	"Sunrise"	Banks, Cocker, Doyle, Mackey, Webber, Mansell	5:53
3.	"The Trees" (Felled by I Monster)	Banks, Cocker, Doyle, Mackey, Webber	5:27

12"
No.	Title	Writer(s)	Length
1.	"Sunrise" (All Seeing I - Middle of the Road Mix)	Banks, Cocker, Doyle, Mackey, Webber, Mansell	6:08
2.	"The Trees" (Felled by I Monster)	Banks, Cocker, Doyle, Mackey, Webber	5:27
3.	"The Trees" (Lovejoy the No Jazz Mix)	Banks, Cocker, Doyle, Mackey, Webber	4:47
