= Masters of the Universe (Pulp album) =

Compilation album by Pulp
- Released: 24 June 1994
- Recorded: June 1985 – June 1986
- Genre: Britpop, indie rock
- Length: 59:36
- Label: Fire

Pulp chronology
His 'n' Hers (1994)	Masters of the Universe (1994)	Different Class (1995)

Professional ratings
Review scores
Source	Rating
AllMusic	2/5 stars
Pitchfork	(6.3/10)

Masters of the Universe is a compilation by the English alternative rock band Pulp, released in 1994.

== Background ==
The compilation brings together the four Pulp singles released on Fire Records between 1985 and 1987, with the exception of "Silence" (originally from the "Master of the Universe" single), which was left off at Jarvis Cocker's request. The two differences of "Master of the Universe (sanitised version)" from the album version are the substitutions of the word "masturbates" with "vegetates" and "cums" with "keeps". The original version can be found on the album Freaks.

Almost all tracks from this compilation were included on Freaks 2012 reissue bonus disc. The two tracks that are not featured are "They Suffocate at Night" (appears on the album itself) and "Master of the Universe (sanitised version)" (the album version appears on the album itself).

== Track listing ==
All songs written by Pulp, except "The Will to Power" lyrics by Russell Senior and music by Pulp.

1. "Little Girl (With Blue Eyes)" – 3:28
2. "Simultaneous" – 4:09
3. "Blue Glow" – 3:06
4. "The Will to Power" – 3:25
5. "Dogs Are Everywhere" – 4:53
6. "The Mark of the Devil" – 4:36
7. "97 Lovers" – 4:30
8. "Aborigine" – 4:53
9. "Goodnight" – 5:08
10. "They Suffocate at Night" – 6:19
11. "Tunnel" – 8:13
12. "Master of the Universe (Sanitised Version)" – 3:23
13. "Manon" – 3:33

== Personnel ==
- Jarvis Cocker – vocals, guitar
- Russell Senior – guitar, violin, vocals on "The Will to Power"
- Candida Doyle – keyboards, backing vocals
- Peter Mansell – bass
- Magnus Doyle – drums
