= The Park Is Mine (Pulp video) =

Video by Pulp
- Released: November 1998
- Recorded: 25 July 1998
- Venue: Finsbury Park, London
- Genre: Britpop
- Length: 89 mins

The Park Is Mine is a live concert video released by Pulp in November 1998, following the release of their album This Is Hardcore. It was recorded at Finsbury Park, London on 25 July 1998. The whole concert was later included on the Ultimate Live DVD.

== Track listing ==
1. "The Fear" (the complete and utter breakdown version)
2. "Do You Remember the First Time?"
3. "Dishes"
4. "Seductive Barry"
5. "Sorted for E's & Wizz"
6. "TV Movie"
7. "A Little Soul"
8. "Party Hard"
9. "Help The Aged"
10. "Sylvia"
11. "This Is Hardcore"
12. "Glory Days"
13. "Common People"
14. "Laughing Boy"
15. "Something Changed"

== Notes ==
The song "I'm a Man" was performed between "Do You Remember The First Time?" and "Dishes", but was edited out of the footage at Jarvis Cocker's request, as he didn't feel it was 'up to scratch'.

== Sources ==
- AcrylicAfternoons
- "Truth and Beauty : the story of Pulp" by Mark Sturdy (Omnibus Press)
