= More (Pulp album) =

Studio album by Pulp
- Released: 6 June 2025
- Recorded: Late 2024
- Studios: Orbb, London
- Length: 50:16
- Label: Rough Trade
- Producer: James Ford

Pulp chronology
Party Clowns: Live in London 1991 (2012)	More (2025)

Singles from More
- 1. "Spike Island" Released: 10 April 2025; 2. "Got to Have Love" Released: 22 May 2025; 3. "Tina" Released: 21 July 2025

More (stylised as More.) is the eighth studio album by the English rock band Pulp, released on 6 June 2025 on Rough Trade Records. Produced by James Ford, it is the band's first studio album in twenty-four years following We Love Life (2001) and is their first album since Freaks (1987) without bass guitarist Steve Mackey, who died in 2023. Mackey is credited as a co-writer on two songs.

The returning four core members of Pulp – vocalist Jarvis Cocker, keyboardist Candida Doyle, drummer Nick Banks and guitarist Mark Webber – were joined in the studio by touring members Andrew McKinney (bass guitar), Emma Smith (violin) and Adam Betts (various instruments), who had previously worked with Cocker on his solo project Jarv Is and its 2020 studio album, Beyond the Pale. Current Pulp touring violist Richard Jones also contributed to the recording process.

Released to widespread critical acclaim, the album debuted at number one on the UK Albums Chart, becoming the band's first number one album in over twenty-seven years, since the release of This Is Hardcore in 1998.

== Artwork ==
The cover by graphic designer Julian House is based on a photograph taken by Jarvis Cocker in the afternoon on 15 July 2024 near Kerlingarfjöll, Iceland whilst out for a walk on holiday with his son, Albert. The original picture was modified to show cardboard cutouts of band members from the cover of Pulp's Different Class (1995).

== Promotion and singles ==
The lead single, "Spike Island", was released on 10 April 2025, accompanied by a music video. It reached number 26 on the Billboard Adult Alternative Airplay chart the following June, marking the first time that a Pulp song had appeared on any radio airplay chart in the United States. The song received a 7" vinyl release with non-album B-side "Open Strings" on 23 May 2025 and subsequently topped the UK Physical Singles chart.

The second single, "Got to Have Love", was released on 22 May 2025 with a music video that included footage of dancers from the Tony Palmer documentary The Wigan Casino (1977).

Following the release of More in June, Pulp revealed the third single, "Tina", on 21 July 2025. Like the previous singles, the song was accompanied by a music video by Julia Schimautz of DTAN Studio, Berlin, with lyrics animated by Gaussian Studio.

To promote the album, the band embarked on the Here Comes More Tour, their most extensive tour since the 1990s. Like with the album, the tour received overwhelmingly positive reviews.

== Release ==
More was released on 6 June 2025 and subsequently debuted at no. 1 on the UK Albums Chart, their third album to do so following Different Class (1995) and This Is Hardcore (1998). Although it failed to chart on the US-based Billboard 200, the album did take a position on the Billboard Independent Albums chart, at no. 43.

== Critical reception ==
Professional ratings
Aggregate scores
Source	Rating
AnyDecentMusic?	8.0/10
Metacritic	83/100
Review scores
Source	Rating
AllMusic	4.5/5 stars
Clash	9/10
Exclaim!	8/10
The Guardian	4/5 stars
The Line of Best Fit	9/10
Mojo	4/5 stars
MusicOMH	4.5/5 stars
Pitchfork	7.5/10
Record Collector	4/5 stars
Rolling Stone	4/5 stars

On Metacritic, which assigns a normalized rating out of 100 to reviews from mainstream critics, More received an average score of 83, based on 23 reviews, which indicates "universal acclaim". Another review aggregator, AnyDecentMusic?, gave the album an 8.0 out of 10, based on 31 critical ratings.

In a review for AllMusic, Heather Phares wrote that after Different Class, "Pulp attempted to put as much distance between themselves and Britpop as they could; on More, they bridge that gap with integrity.... [Cocker] and the rest of the band may be older, but they never sound as weary as they did on This Is Hardcore and We Love Life.... More is classic Pulp, aged to near perfection." In a 7.5/10 Pitchfork review, Nina Tavakoli wrote "though the album still has grounding in big fat basslines and BPMs that occasionally flirt with disco, the distinct chug of longtime bassist Steve Mackey... is missing all over", then adding "But Pulp remains resolutely Pulpy, and the ingredients and pillars that are absent are outpaced by what still is." Awarding the album 4 stars out of 5, Mojo's John Mulvey stated, "If Pulp seem older and wiser – allbeit no less fun – now, they often seemed older and somewhat wiser than their Britpop peers in the 1990s", concluding that More "is greater than the sum of its fan service parts – that rarest of reunion records, in fact: one that transcends nostalgia to actually enhance a band’s legacy."

Andrew Trendell of the NME awarded the album five stars, writing that it "is everything you'd want a Pulp album to be, made richer from some lived experience" and, after comparing it to Blur's The Ballad of Darren and Suede's post-reunion works, added that "Pulp have retained their original spirit and flair into a statement of middle age without feeling any less vital." Ed Power of The Irish Times had a more tempered view, writing that the album "isn't entirely a disaster: it won't ruin your memories of Pulp's glory days".

=== Accolades ===
On 10 September 2025, More was announced as one of 12 nominees for the 2025 Mercury Prize.

Year-end lists
Publication	List	Rank	Ref.
AllMusic	Best of 2025	N/A	
AllMusic	Favorite Alternative & Indie Albums	N/A	
Classic Pop	The Best of 2025: New Albums	8	
Classic Rock	Top 50 Albums of 2025	42	
Flood Magazine	The Best Albums of 2025	10	
The Guardian	The 50 Best Albums of 2025	16	
Hot Press	50 Best Albums of 2025	15	
Les Inrockuptibles	Best of 2025: Music	3	
Louder Than War	Top 100 Albums of 2025	15	
Mojo	The 75 Best Albums of 2025	1	
NME	The 50 Albums of 2025	16	
PopMatters	The 80 Best Albums of 2025	32	
PopMatters	The 30 Best Rock Albums of 2025	19	
The Quietus	Albums of the Year 2025	95	
Record Collector	The Best of 2025: New Albums Top 25	2	
Rolling Stone	The 100 Best Albums of 2025	41	
Rolling Stone	The 55 Best Indie-Rock Albums of 2025	13	
Rough Trade (Note: The year-end ranking of More by Rough Trade is by the retailer, as opposed to Rough Trade Records (the album's record label); while independent from each other, the label had originally been a part of the retailer.)	Albums of the Year 2025	3	
Uncut	Best New Albums of 2025	1	
Under the Radar	Top 100 Albums of 2025	3	

== Track listing ==
All lyrics are written by Jarvis Cocker, except "A Sunset" (written with the Earth); all music is composed by Nick Banks, Jarvis Cocker, Candida Doyle, Mark Webber, Jason Buckle, Andrew McKinney, and Emma Smith, with additional composers noted.

More track listing
No.	Title	Music	Length
1.	"Spike Island"	Adam Betts	4:42
2.	"Tina"	Betts	3:32
3.	"Grown Ups"	Steve Mackey	5:56
4.	"Slow Jam"	Serafina Steer	5:06
5.	"Farmers Market"		4:30
6.	"My Sex"	Betts	4:25
7.	"Got to Have Love" ( (Note: "Got to Have Love" contains a sample from "Invention" by Nick Ingman.))	Betts; Nick Ingman; Mackey	4:52
8.	"Background Noise"		3:41
9.	"Partial Eclipse"	Steer	4:38
10.	"The Hymn of the North" (feat. Chilly Gonzales)	Betts	5:40
11.	"A Sunset" ( (Note: The writing for "A Sunset" is co-credited to the Earth, which allows a portion of income generated to be allotted toward Brian Eno's charity initiative EarthPercent.))	The Earth; Richard Hawley	3:14
Total length:			50:16

Japanese CD bonus track
No.	Title	Length
12.	"Open Strings"	4:09

== Personnel ==
Credits adapted from the CD liner notes and Tidal.

Pulp

- Jarvis Cocker – vocals (all tracks), Dobro guitar (1), guitar (2–4), Wurlitzer piano (6), acoustic guitar (7), Korg Trident (8), classical guitar (9)
- Candida Doyle – Farfisa keyboard (1–5, 11), piano (6, 8, 10), Solina (7), synth (8), Korg Trident synth (9)
- Mark Webber – guitar (1, 4–11), electric guitar (2–3), piano (4)
- Nick Banks – drums (all tracks), Synare (6)

The Elysian Collective

- Emma Smith – violin (all tracks), 12 string Vox guitar (7), string arrangement (2–7, 9–10), choir vocals (2, 5–6, 9–10), backing vocals (1, 4)
- Rich Jones – conductor (2, 4–11), string arrangement (2–5, 7, 9–10), viola (1, 3–4, 6, 8, 11), piano (2, 4–5, 7, 9), backing vocals (3), keyboards (8)
- Laura Moody – cello (1–5, 7, 9–11), choir vocals (2, 5–6, 9–10), vocal arrangement (2, 5–6, 9, 11)
- Jennymay Logan – violin (1–5, 7, 9–10), choir vocals (2, 5–6, 9–10)
- Paloma Deike, Phil Granell, Rosie Tompsett – violin (2–7, 9–11)
- Sergio de Serra – cello (2–7, 9–11)
- Charlotte Stock – viola (2–7, 9–10), choir vocals (2, 5–6, 9–10)
- David Kadumukasa – cello (2–5, 7, 9–10), choir vocals (2, 5–6, 9–10)
- Shelley Britton, Zami Jalil – viola (2–5, 7, 9–10), choir vocals (2, 5–6, 9–10)
- Freya Goldmark – violin (2–5, 7, 9–10)
- Flora Curzon – choir vocals (2, 5–6, 9–10), violin (7, 10)
- Jordan Bergmans – viola (7, 10)
- Mandhira de Saram, Patrick Dawkins, Ros Stephen – violin (7, 10)
- Sam Becker – double bass (7, 10)
- Val Welbanks – cello (7, 10)

Additional musicians

- Andrew McKinney – bass (all tracks)
- Jason Buckle – electronics (all tracks), guitar (3–4)
- Chihiro Ono – violin (2–5, 7, 9–10)
- Adem Ilhan, Leo Chadburn, Mara Carlyle, Matthew Kerr – choir vocals (2, 5–6, 9–10)
- Adam Betts – Synare (1), percussion (2, 7, 10)
- Animesh Raval – piano (3–4), Wurlitzer (3)
- Serafina Steer – keyboard (4)
- Chilly Gonzales – piano (10)
- Richard Hawley – acoustic guitar (11)
- Brian Eno, Cecily Eno, Darla Eno, Irial Eno, Lotti Eno – vocals (11)

Technical and design

- James Ford – production
- Animesh Raval – engineering, mixing
- Matt Colton – mastering
- Julian House – design, image creation
- Jarvis Cocker – original landscape and studio shot photography, cover concept
- Rankin – cover band cut-outs
- Tom Jackson – LP back cover band and book back cover portrait
- Ashley Bayston – studio painting

== Charts ==
=== Weekly charts ===
Weekly chart performance for More
Chart (2025)	Peak position
Australian Albums (ARIA)	33
Austrian Albums (Ö3 Austria)	5
Belgian Albums (Ultratop Flanders)	15
Belgian Albums (Ultratop Wallonia)	17
Croatian International Albums (HDU)	1
Danish Albums (Hitlisten)	27
Dutch Albums (Album Top 100)	15
French Albums (SNEP)	26
German Albums (Offizielle Top 100)	9
Irish Albums (Official Charts)	6
Japanese Albums (Oricon)	48
New Zealand Albums (RMNZ)	11
Portuguese Albums (AFP)	16
Scottish Albums (OCC)	1
Spanish Albums (Promusicae)	25
Swiss Albums (Schweizer Hitparade)	7
UK Albums (Official Charts)	1
UK Independent Albums (OCC)	1
US Independent Albums (Billboard)	43
US Top Album Sales (Billboard)	15

=== Year-end charts ===
Year-end chart performance for More
Chart (2025)	Position
Croatian International Albums (HDU)	1

== Certifications ==
Certifications for More
Region	Certification	Certified units/sales
United Kingdom (BPI)	Silver	60,000^{‡}
^{‡} Sales+streaming figures based on certification alone.

== See also ==
- Here Comes More Tour
