= Dogs Are Everywhere =

Single by Pulp
- Released: 30 June 1986
- Recorded: February 1986
- Studio: Input Studios, Sheffield
- Genre: Alternative rock
- Length: 4:53
- Label: Fire
- Songwriter(s): Jarvis Cocker; Candida Doyle; Peter Mansell; Russell Senior

Pulp singles chronology
"Little Girl (With Blue Eyes)" (1985)	"Dogs Are Everywhere" (1986)	"They Suffocate at Night" (1987)

"Dogs Are Everywhere" is a non-album single released by British band Pulp in 1986. The title song is a soft ballad reminiscent of the band's first album It, but the B-sides have a darker sound closer to what would become the band's next album, Freaks (1987). All of the songs are included on the 1994 compilation album Masters of the Universe.

Andrea 'Enthal in Spin described the songs as "tense and involving that listening to them leaves you exhausted".

== Track listing ==
All songs written and composed by Jarvis Cocker, Candida Doyle, Peter Mansell and Russell Senior.

Side A

1. "Dogs Are Everywhere" – 4:53
2. "The Mark of the Devil" – 4:35

Side B

1. "97 Lovers" – 4:30
2. "Aborigine" – 4:53
3. "Goodnight" – 5:08

== Personnel ==
- Jarvis Cocker – Guitar, Vocals
- Candida Doyle – Keyboards
- Magnus Doyle – Drums
- Peter Mansell – Bass
- Russell Senior – Guitar, Violin, bowed bass guitar
