= My Lighthouse =

Single by Pulp

from the album It
- B-side: "Looking for Life"
- Released: 2 May 1983
- Genre: Indie pop
- Length: 3:28
- Label: Red Rhino
- Songwriter: Jarvis Cocker/Simon Hinkler
- Producer: Simon Hinkler

Pulp singles chronology
"My Lighthouse" (1983)	"Everybody's Problem" (1983)

"My Lighthouse" is the first single by British band Pulp, released in 1983 and taken from the band's debut album It. The song is a gentle acoustic ballad. It was performed live as part of Pulp's 2012 appearance at the Royal Albert Hall for the Teenage Cancer Trust.

== Track listing ==
All songs written and composed by Jarvis Cocker and Simon Hinkler.

1. "My Lighthouse" (7" Mix) – 3:28
2. "Looking for Life" – 5:26
