= Ultimate Live =

Video by Pulp
- Released: 20 June 2005
- Genre: Britpop
- Length: 195 mins

Ultimate Live is a DVD by Pulp featuring two concerts, one from 1995 and the other one from 1998. Both concerts had been previously released separately on VHS.

== Track listing ==
=== F.E.E.L.I.N.G.C.A.L.L.E.D.L.I.V.E ===
Recorded at the Brixton Academy, London - 21 December 1995

1. "Do You Remember the First Time?"
2. "Monday Morning"
3. "Pencil Skirt"
4. "I Spy"
5. "Sorted for E's & Wizz"
6. "Something Changed"
7. "Live Bed Show"
8. "Acrylic Afternoons"
9. "Babies"
10. "Disco 2000"
11. "Mis-Shapes"
12. "F.E.E.L.I.N.G.C.A.L.L.E.D.L.O.V.E"
13. "Underwear"
14. "Common People"

=== The Park Is Mine ===
Recorded at Finsbury Park, London - 25 July 1998

1. "The Fear" [The Complete and Utter Breakdown Version]
2. "Do You Remember The First Time?"
3. "Dishes"
4. "Seductive Barry"
5. "Sorted for E's & Wizz"
6. "TV Movie"
7. "A Little Soul"
8. "Party Hard"
9. "Help The Aged"
10. "Sylvia"
11. "This Is Hardcore"
12. "Glory Days"
13. "Common People"
14. "Laughing Boy"
15. "Something Changed"

== Notes ==
- The F.E.E.L.I.N.G.C.A.L.L.E.D.L.I.V.E section of the DVD suffers from a manufacturing flaw. The playback of the entire concert is noticeably slower than the original VHS release, affecting the pitch of the songs and making the band sometimes sound out of key.
- The song "I'm a Man" was performed at the Finsbury Park concert (between "Do You Remember The First Time?" and "Dishes"), but was edited out of the footage at Jarvis Cocker's request, as he didn't feel it was 'up to scratch'.

== Sources ==
- AcrylicAfternoons
- "Truth and Beauty : the story of Pulp" by Mark Sturdy (Omnibus Press)
