= We Love Life =

Studio album by Pulp
- Released: 22 October 2001
- Recorded: 2001
- Studio: Metropolis, London
- Genre: Alternative rock
- Length: 53:55
- Label: Island
- Producer: Scott Walker; Peter Walsh (co.)

Pulp chronology
Freshly Squeezed... the Early Years (1998)	We Love Life (2001)	Hits (2002)

Pulp studio album chronology
This Is Hardcore (1998)	We Love Life (2001)	More (2025)

Singles from We Love Life
- 1. "Sunrise" / "The Trees" Released: 8 October 2001; 2. "Bad Cover Version" Released: 15 April 2002

We Love Life is the seventh studio album by English rock band Pulp, released on 22 October 2001 by Island Records. It is the band's final studio album to feature bass guitarist Steve Mackey, who died in 2023.

Written and recorded after the tumultuous sessions for This Is Hardcore, We Love Life saw the band move toward a more relaxed and natural sound, shepherded by producer and singer-songwriter Scott Walker. Walker had replaced original producer Chris Thomas, whom the band had worked with on the band's two previous albums. It was the band's last album for over two decades until More (2025).

The album reached number six on the UK Albums Chart, with a total chart stay of three weeks.

== Background ==
We Love Life was intended to be a departure from the disillusionment of the band's previous album, This Is Hardcore, in that it featured a more organic sound and an emphasis on nature, which Cocker found interest in "because it is dangerous in some ways". Cocker explained, "I never took any notice of nature when I was a kid. I thought we'd all be living on space stations or floating metropolises by now. But after This Is Hardcore, which was a very alienated record, it was time to go back to simpler things, like this, the natural world." At the same time, Cocker stated, "This isn't Pulp's pastoral album. I was very aware of avoiding hippy dippy stuff."

The band had initially begun recording with Chris Thomas, who had produced their past two albums. However, his more rigid style of recording conflicted with the band's desire for looser sessions, resulting in the recordings being shelved. The final album was produced by Scott Walker. Keyboardist Candida Doyle recalled, "I certainly thought about leaving [after shelving the Thomas sessions] but I realised that I'd still feel shit even if I did. If Scott Walker hadn't come about, I don't think we'd have bothered to finish this LP." The band, who had met Walker at the 2000 Meltdown Festival run by Walker, had been longtime fans of Walker.

Walker's own album 'Til the Band Comes In is mocked in the lyrics of the We Love Life single "Bad Cover Version". Cocker claims the lyric was written long before Walker became involved in the album's production and recalled the moment of recording the song as "embarrassing".

== Title and artwork ==
The album's title was originally to be Pulp Love Life, but this was vetoed as Cocker felt that the title looked confusing on an album cover—he explained, "It always looked like the name of the band's Pulp and the album's called Love Life." The album was then renamed Pulp, reflecting the "uncluttered" nature of the album. With the September 11 terrorist attacks, however, the album was renamed to the more universal We Love Life. Cocker recalled, "To be honest, I was really freaked out when that World Trade Center thing happened. ... So in the aftermath of that, I thought, actually this Love Life business isn't a bad sentiment at this particular time."

The minimal cover art (by Peter Saville) shows a set of initial capitals held in the collection of St. Bride Printing Library in London. They were engraved in wood by or for Louis Pouchée around the 1820s. It would later inspire the artwork for American metal band Deafheaven's 2013 album Sunbather.

== Reception ==
Professional ratings
Aggregate scores
Source	Rating
Metacritic	84/100
Review scores
Source	Rating
AllMusic	4.5/5 stars
Blender	4/5 stars
Entertainment Weekly	B
The Guardian	5/5 stars
NME	7/10
Pitchfork	8.2/10
Q	4/5 stars
Rolling Stone	3/5 stars
Spin	9/10
Uncut	5/5 stars

Initial critical response to We Love Life was very positive. The album received an average score of 84 at Metacritic, based on 20 reviews. The music review online magazine Pitchfork placed We Love Life at number 194 on their list of the top 200 albums of the 2000s.

Steve Hobbs of Q Magazine wrote of the album, "Cocker's lyrics are still sharp and beautifully observed, just a little less personal. But in many ways, it's a more familiar Pulp record than This Is Hardcore." Stephen Thomas Erlewine of AllMusic called the album "an emotional and musical breakthrough, finding the band leaping beyond the claustrophobic Hardcore and consolidating their previous obsessions, creating a textured, reflective record that in its own measured way is as impassioned as Different Class."

== Track listing ==
All tracks are written by Jarvis Cocker, Nick Banks, Candida Doyle, Steve Mackey and Mark Webber, except where noted.

No.	Title	Writer(s)	Length
1.	"Weeds"		3:42
2.	"Weeds II (The Origin of the Species)"		3:58
3.	"The Night That Minnie Timperley Died"		4:38
4.	"The Trees" (samples "Tell Her You Love Her" written by Stanley Myers and Hal Shaper)		4:49
5.	"Wickerman" (samples "Willow's Song" composed by Paul Giovanni, from the British Lion film The Wicker Man)		8:17
6.	"I Love Life"		5:31
7.	"The Birds in Your Garden"		4:11
8.	"Bob Lind (The Only Way Is Down)"		4:16
9.	"Bad Cover Version"		4:16
10.	"Roadkill"		4:16
11.	"Sunrise"	Cocker, Banks, Doyle, Mackey, Webber, Peter Mansell	6:02
Total length:			53:55

United States CD bonus tracks
No.	Title	Length
12.	"Yesterday"	3:52
13.	"Forever in My Dreams"	4:23
Total length:		62:10

== Personnel ==
Credits adapted from liner notes.

Additional musicians

- Alasdair Malloy – percussion (1), glass harmonica (5)
- Luís Jardim – percussion (2)
- Danny Cummings – percussion (3)
- Julian Poole – percussion (9, 11)
- Steve Hilton – programming (1, 5)
- Howie B – programming (2)
- Richard Hawley – lap steel guitar (1, 11), twelve-string guitar (8)
- The Swingle Singers – backing vocals (1, 2, 5)
  - Joanna Forbes – musical direction, vocal arrangements
- Beverly Skeete – backing vocals (9)
- Sylvia James – backing vocals (9)
- Claudia Fontaine – backing vocals (9)
- Jeremy Shaw – keyboards (2)
- Scott Walker – additional keyboards and tree effects (4), baritone guitar (6)
- Andy Findon – ocarinas and flutes (7)
- Caspar Cronk – musical saw (7)
- Timos Papadopoulos at the Institute of Sound and Vibration Research, Southampton University under supervision of Professor Phil Nelson – birdsong (7)
- Philip Sheppard – five string electric cello (10)
- Metro Voices – choir

Production

- Scott Walker – production, mixing
- Peter Walsh – co-production, engineering, mixing; choir engineering (11)
- Matt Lawrence – assistant engineering; additional choir engineering (11)
- Chris Blair – mastering
- Clive Goddard – choir engineering (11)
- Geoff Foster – strings recording
- Gavyn Wright – strings leading
- Isobel Griffiths – orchestral contracting
- Jenny O'Grady – choral co-ordination
- Steve Price – choir recording

Arrangement

- Scott Walker – strings (5, 9), ten double basses (6, 8)
- Brian Gascoigne – strings (1, 5, 9), ten double basses (8), choir (11)
- Candida Doyle – strings (1, 5, 9)

Artwork

- Jarvis Cocker – art direction
- Peter Saville – art direction
- Howard Wakefield – design
- Marcus Werner Hed – design

== Charts ==
Chart (2001)	Peak position
Australian Albums (ARIA)	46
Austrian Albums (Ö3 Austria)	36
Danish Albums (Hitlisten)	38
French Albums (SNEP)	41
German Albums (Offizielle Top 100)	25
Irish Albums (IRMA)	38
Scottish Albums (OCC)	11
Swedish Albums (Sverigetopplistan)	46
Swiss Albums (Schweizer Hitparade)	78
UK Albums (OCC)	6

== Certifications ==
Region	Certification	Certified units/sales
United Kingdom (BPI)	Silver	60,000^{^}
^{^} Shipments figures based on certification alone.
