= Freaks (Pulp album) =

Studio album by Pulp
- Released: 11 May 1987
- Recorded: June 1986
- Studio: Input, Sheffield
- Genre: Post-punk
- Length: 44:13
- Label: Fire
- Producer: Pulp

Pulp chronology
It (1983)	Freaks (1987)	Separations (1992)

Singles from Freaks
- 1. "They Suffocate at Night" Released: 5 January 1987; 2. "Master of the Universe" Released: 30 March 1987

Alternative cover
- 2012 re-release

Freaks (released with the subtitle Ten Stories About Power, Claustrophobia, Suffocation and Holding Hands) is the second studio album by English rock band Pulp, released on 11 May 1987 by Fire Records.

== Release and aftermath ==
Professional ratings
Review scores
Source	Rating
AllMusic	2/5 stars
Consequence	C–
Drowned in Sound	6/10
Encyclopedia of Popular Music	2/5 stars
The Great Rock Discography	4/10
MusicHound	2.5/5
Pitchfork	7.1/10
The Rolling Stone Album Guide	1/5 stars
Sounds	4/5 stars

Freaks was released in 1987 to little commercial success and features a much darker sound than its predecessor, It. Russell Senior sings lead vocals on "Fairground" and "Anorexic Beauty". "Master of the Universe" was released as a single in an alternative version called the "sanitised version"; it replaces the word "masturbates" with "vegetates".

"I Want You" is the only song from the album to have been performed live regularly, most notably during the UK Forest Tour in the Summer of 2002.

The album was reissued and remastered by Fire Records in 2012 along with 1983's It and 1992's Separations. This re-release took several delays as the first stated release date was 8 August 2011 while the albums finally came out on 13 February 2012. An announcement in the interim stated that the albums would be remastered with new bonus tracks to be added to the track listings as well as new artwork and liner notes from music journalist Everett True.

The reissue bonus disc is in fact Masters of the Universe compilation aside from two tracks: "They Suffocate at Night" which appears on the album itself and "Master of the Universe (sanitised version)" which again appears on the album without censorship.

== Track listing ==
All lyrics are written by Jarvis Cocker, except where noted; all music is composed by Pulp.

Side one
No.	Title	Writer(s)	Length
1.	"Fairground"	Russell Senior	5:07
2.	"I Want You"		4:42
3.	"Being Followed Home"		6:03
4.	"Master of the Universe"		3:22
5.	"Life Must Be So Wonderful"		3:59

Side two
No.	Title	Writer(s)	Length
6.	"There's No Emotion"		4:28
7.	"Anorexic Beauty"	David Kurley	2:59
8.	"The Never-Ending Story"		3:01
9.	"Don't You Know"		4:09
10.	"They Suffocate at Night"		6:17
Total length:			44:13

Fire Records 2012 reissue bonus disc
No.	Title	Length
1.	"Little Girl (With Blue Eyes)" (Non-album single)	3:28
2.	"Simultaneous" (B-side to "Little Girl (With Blue Eyes)")	4:09
3.	"Blue Glow" (B-side to "Little Girl (With Blue Eyes)")	3:06
4.	"The Will to Power" (B-side to "Little Girl (With Blue Eyes)")	3:25
5.	"Dogs Are Everywhere" (Non-album single)	4:53
6.	"The Mark of the Devil" (B-side to "Dogs Are Everywhere")	4:36
7.	"97 Lovers" (B-side to "Dogs Are Everywhere")	4:30
8.	"Aborigine" (B-side to "Dogs Are Everywhere")	4:53
9.	"Goodnight" (B-side to "Dogs Are Everywhere")	5:08
10.	"Tunnel" (B-side to "They Suffocate at Night")	8:13
11.	"Manon" (B-side to "Master of the Universe")	3:33

== Personnel ==
Pulp

- Jarvis Cocker – lead vocals, guitar, drums on "Anorexic Beauty"
- Russell Senior – violin, guitar, lead vocals on "Fairground" and "Anorexic Beauty"
- Candida Doyle – organ, piano, backing vocals on "There's No Emotion"
- Peter Mansell – bass, guitar on "Life Must Be So Wonderful"
- Magnus Doyle – drums, percussion, guitar on "Anorexic Beauty"

Additional personnel

- Jonathon Kirk – mixing assistance
- Graeme Durham – mastering
- The Robert Winterman Design Group – sleeve design
