= They Suffocate at Night =

Single by Pulp

from the album Freaks
- B-side: "Tunnel"
- Released: 5 January 1987
- Recorded: Input Studios, Sheffield; June 1986
- Genre: Alternative rock
- Length: 4:00 (Edited); 6:17 (Uncut)
- Label: Fire
- Songwriter(s): Jarvis Cocker, Russell Senior, Candida Doyle, Peter Mansell, Magnus Doyle
- Producer(s): Pulp, Jonathan Kirk

Pulp singles chronology
"Dogs Are Everywhere" (1986)	"They Suffocate at Night" (1987)	"Master of the Universe" (1987)

"They Suffocate at Night" is the first single from the album Freaks by British band Pulp, released in 1987. The song and its B-side "Tunnel" were later included on the compilation album Masters of the Universe.

== Track listing ==
All songs written and composed by Pulp.

7" vinyl

1. "They Suffocate at Night" (edited version) – 4:00
2. "Tunnel" (cut-up version) – 4:30

12" vinyl

1. "They Suffocate at Night" (uncut version) – 6:17
2. "Tunnel" (full-length version) – 8:13

== Video ==
Singer Jarvis Cocker recalled of the video: "It was made by someone who claimed to have done the lighting on Chariots of Fire, which impressed us a great deal at the time... we could only afford one roll of film, so he had to keep winding the film backwards and forwards for different bits of the song. I converted an inspection pit, in an abandoned warehouse across the road from the factory where I was living, into a sunken bedroom... For some reason, there was a horse skeleton in the building so that ended up in the film too."
