= My Legendary Girlfriend =

Single by Pulp

from the album Separations
- Released: 25 February 1991 (12"); September 1992 (7"); November 1996 (CD)
- Recorded: August 1989 to January 1990, Fon Studios
- Genre: Synthpop, alternative rock
- Length: 6:44
- Label: Fire; Caff (1992 release)
- Songwriter(s): Jarvis Cocker/Pulp
- Producer(s): Alan Smyth; Pulp

Pulp singles chronology
"Master of the Universe" (1987)	"My Legendary Girlfriend" (1991)	"Countdown" (1991)

"My Legendary Girlfriend" is the first single from the album Separations by British band Pulp. The single was first released in 1991 on 12" vinyl and then in 1996 on CD featuring the original track-listing. "Is This House?" and "This House Is Condemned" were remixed by Parrot (Richard Barratt) and Winston (Winston Hazel).

There is a 7" vinyl limited edition of 500 copies version of the single released in 1992 on Bob Stanley's label Caff Records. The new A-side "My Legendary Girlfriend" was taken from 11 September 1991 live BBC soundcheck. "Sickly Grin" and "Back in L.A." are 1982 and 1984 demos accordingly.

== Track listings ==
All songs written and composed by Pulp.

12" vinyl/CD single

1. "My Legendary Girlfriend" – 6:44
2. "Is This House?" – 7:59
3. "This House Is Condemned" (Remix) – 7:31

7" vinyl

1. "My Legendary Girlfriend" – 6:51
2. "Sickly Grin" – 3:12
3. "Back in L.A." – 2:03
