= Countdown (Pulp song) =

Single by Pulp

from the album Separations
- B-side: "Death Goes to the Disco"
- Released: 19 August 1991
- Recorded: Fon Studios, January 1990; Remixed at Fon May 1991
- Genre: Synthpop
- Length: 4:42
- Label: Fire
- Songwriter(s): Pulp
- Producer(s): Alan Smyth, Pulp

Pulp singles chronology
"My Legendary Girlfriend" (1991)	"Countdown" (1991)	"O.U. (Gone, Gone)" (1992)

"Countdown" is the second and final single from the album Separations by British band Pulp. The song was re-recorded for the single release. The CD single cover stated the same track listing as 12" single but the tracks were reversed.

== Track listing ==
All songs written and composed by Pulp.

12" vinyl

1. "Countdown" (extended version) – 8:05
2. "Death Goes to the Disco" – 5:44
3. "Countdown" (radio edit) – 4:42

CD single

1. "Countdown" (radio edit) – 4:42
2. "Death Goes to the Disco" – 5:44
3. "Countdown" (extended version) – 8:05
