= Little Girl (With Blue Eyes) =

Single by Pulp
- Released: 2 December 1985
- Recorded: Input Studios, Sheffield; June 1985
- Genre: Alternative rock
- Length: 3:28
- Label: Fire
- Songwriter: Pulp
- Producer: Simon Hinkler

Pulp singles chronology
| "Everybody's Problem" (1983) | "Little Girl (With Blue Eyes)" (1985) | "Dogs Are Everywhere" (1986) |

"Little Girl (With Blue Eyes)" is a non-album single by British band Pulp, released in 1985. It features very dark songs, far from the acoustic feel of the first album It (1983). The four songs from the single are all included on the 1994 compilation album Masters of the Universe.

The single peaked at number 43 on the UK Singles Chart in September 2022.

== Track listing ==
All lyrics written by Jarvis Cocker, except "The Will to Power" lyrics by Russell Senior, all music composed by Pulp.

1. "Little Girl (With Blue Eyes)" – 3:28
2. "Simultaneous" – 4:09
3. "Blue Glow" – 3:06
4. "The Will to Power" – 3:25

== Personnel ==
- Jarvis Cocker – lead vocals, guitar
- Russell Senior – guitar, violin, lead vocals on "The Will to Power"
- Candida Doyle – keyboards, organ, backing vocals on "Little Girl (With Blue Eyes)"
- Peter Mansell – bass
- Magnus Doyle – drums
