= Separations (album) =

Studio album by Pulp
- Released: 19 June 1992
- Recorded: August 1989 – January 1990
- Studio: Fon, Sheffield
- Genre: Synthpop; IDM; alternative rock; acid house; Britpop; experimental; indie pop; folk
- Length: 48:41
- Label: Fire
- Producer: Alan Smyth; Pulp

Pulp chronology
Freaks (1987)	Separations (1992)	Intro – The Gift Recordings (1993)

Pulp studio album chronology
Freaks (1987)	Separations (1992)	His 'n' Hers (1994)

Singles from Separations
- 1. "My Legendary Girlfriend" Released: 25 February 1991; 2. "Countdown" Released: August 1991

Alternative cover
- 2012 re-release

Separations is the third studio album by English band Pulp, released on 19 June 1992 by UK indie Fire Records. Recorded much earlier, in 1989, it was the band's final original release with Fire before their transition to a major-label career and mainstream success.

== Recording, release and aftermath ==
Professional ratings
Review scores
Source	Rating
AllMusic	3/5 stars
Consequence	B
Drowned in Sound	7/10
Encyclopedia of Popular Music	3/5 stars
The Great Rock Discography	5/10
NME	7/10
Pitchfork	6.7/10
Q	2/5 stars
The Rolling Stone Album Guide	2/5 stars
Vox	7/10

Pulp's initial deal with Fire Records had expired, following the release of several singles and the 1987 LP Freaks, when in 1989 the label approached frontman Jarvis Cocker about re-signing the band. Whereas the group had, to its chagrin, only been allotted £600 to record Freaks, Fire now promised a £10,000 budget for its next project. Still wary from their prior experience with the label, the band booked Sheffield's FON studio and producer Alan Smyth to begin recording what would become Separations; according to drummer Nick Banks, the band hoped to use the studio advance without actually formalising a new deal with Fire.

The material represented a new direction for the band, with vocal-driven ballads on the first side and an acid house influence on the second. The disparate styles can be attributed to the interplay of tastes between Cocker and then-new bassist Steve Mackey; Mackey introduced Cocker to house music and raving upon the singer's move to London, while Cocker introduced Mackey to "Scott Walker and Serge Gainsbourg". Cocker was also inspired by the band Magazine's early work that "had attack to it combined with a real intelligence, without going into ponce territory". Of perhaps the most consequence to the album's electronic leanings, Banks ultimately programmed his parts into a drum machine rather than performing live on the record, a concession requested by Smyth out of concern for time and budget in light of the liberal use of MIDI sequencing requested by the band. Separations is also notable for the track "This House Is Condemned" being the last of the occasional lead vocal performances by guitarist/violinist Russell Senior found throughout Pulp's early catalog, a role which he would later claim not to have ever relished:

I used to 'sing' in Pulp and I'm not quite sure why this came about, because I can't sing for toffee and have never been under any illusions about it...I really wasn't comfortable with singing in Pulp but Jarvis was keen on it, he said it gave him a break.

Upon completing the album, with no discernible interest from any other label, the band reluctantly agreed to re-sign with Fire Records.

The album was reissued and remastered by Fire in 2012 along with 1983's It and 1987's Freaks. This re-release took several delays as the first stated release date was 8 August 2011 while the albums finally came out on 13 February 2012. An announcement in the interim stated that the albums would be remastered with new bonus tracks to be added to the track listings as well as new artwork and liner notes from music journalist Everett True.

This re-release gives an opportunity to hear "Death Comes to Town" which was previously released in 2005 only on CD that accompanied Sheffield journalist Martin Lilleker's book Beats Working for a Living. This 22-song CD featured rare tracks from some of the bands featured in the book.

"Death Goes to the Disco" and "Is This House?" are remixes of "Death Comes To Town" and "This House Is Condemned" respectively.

The bonus track "Is This House?" on the 2012 edition is labelled incorrectly. This track is taken from "My Legendary Girlfriend" single, where two remixes of the song "This House Is Condemned" by Parrot & Winston can be found, but it is in fact the remix titled simply "This House Is Condemned (Remix)"

Scottish musician Momus claims that Cocker wrote to him with an invitation to produce Separations, but that he ignored it.

== Track listing ==
All music written by Pulp and lyrics written by Jarvis Cocker, except where noted. (Note: Cocker is credited as the sole writer in the liner notes of the album's 2012 reissue. The liner notes of the album's original release simply credit Pulp.)

Side one
No.	Title	Length
1.	"Love Is Blind"	5:45
2.	"Don't You Want Me Anymore?"	3:52
3.	"She's Dead"	5:09
4.	"Separations"	4:45
5.	"Down by the River"	3:39

Side two
No.	Title	Writer(s)	Length
6.	"Countdown"		5:07
7.	"My Legendary Girlfriend"		6:51
8.	"Death II"		5:36
9.	"This House Is Condemned"	Russell Senior	7:52
Total length:			48:41

2012 reissue (bonus tracks)
No.	Title	Length
10.	"Death Goes to the Disco" (B-side to "Countdown")	5:42
11.	"Is This House?" (B-side to "My Legendary Girlfriend")	7:36
12.	"Countdown (Extended Version)" (B-side to "Countdown")	8:04
13.	"Death Comes to Town" (from the Beats Working for a Living: The Story of Popular Music in Sheffield 1973–1984 book bonus CD)	4:26

== Personnel ==
Pulp

- Jarvis Cocker – vocals, guitar
- Steve Mackey – bass
- Candida Doyle – keyboards
- Nick Banks – drums
- Russell Senior – guitar, violin, lead vocals on "This House Is Condemned"

Additional personnel

- Alan Fisch – engineering
- Martyn Broadhead – sleeve design basis
- Alex Hornsby – layout, additional design
