= It (Pulp album) =

Studio album by Pulp
- Released: 18 April 1983
- Recorded: 22 August 1982 – 15 January 1983
- Studios: Victoria, Sheffield; Southern, London; Input, Sheffield
- Genres: Indie folk; bedroom pop
- Length: 25:32
- Label: Red Rhino
- Producer: Simon Hinkler

Pulp chronology
It (1983)	Freaks (1987)

Singles from It
- 1. "My Lighthouse" Released: 2 May 1983

It is the debut studio album by English rock band Pulp, released on 18 April 1983 by Red Rhino Records.

== Release and aftermath ==
Professional ratings
Review scores
Source	Rating
AllMusic	2/5 stars
Clash	7/10
Drowned in Sound	6/10
Encyclopedia of Popular Music	2/5 stars
The Great Rock Discography	4/10
MusicHound	2.5/5
Pitchfork	6.1/10
The Rolling Stone Album Guide	1/5 stars
Sounds	4/5 stars
Spin	3/10

It was originally released as a limited vinyl mini-LP of 2000 copies in April 1983. The album's title is a deliberate pun: when added to the name of the band it spells "pulpit".

The first reissue on CD was by Cherry Red in February 1994 with three bonus tracks ("Looking for Life", "Everybody's Problem" and "There Was..."). However, this release was soon deleted as Cherry Red did not own the material. Later that year Fire Records made its own re-release in November 1994, but without "Everybody's Problem" and "There Was..." as bonus tracks. The album existed in this form for all subsequent releases.

The album was reissued and remastered by Fire Records in 2012 along with Pulp's 1987's Freaks and 1992's Separations. This re-release took several delays as the first stated release date was 8 August 2011 while the albums finally came out on 13 February 2012. An announcement in the interim stated that the albums would be remastered with new bonus tracks to be added to the track listings as well as new artwork and liner notes from music journalist Everett True.

== Track listing ==
All songs written by Jarvis Cocker, except where noted.

Side 1

1. "My Lighthouse" (Cocker, Simon Hinkler) – 3:30
2. "Wishful Thinking" – 4:17
3. "Joking Aside" – 4:20
4. "Boats and Trains" – 1:34

Side 2

1. "Blue Girls" – 5:56
2. "Love Love" – 3:09
3. "In Many Ways" – 2:46

=== Bonus tracks ===
Fire Records 1994 reissue

1. "Looking for Life" (B-side to "My Lighthouse" single) – 5:29

Fire Records 2012 reissue

1. "My Lighthouse" (single version) – 3:28
2. "Please Don't Worry" – 3:24
3. "Blue Girls" (alternative mix) – 6:05
4. "Sink or Swim" – 4:02

== Personnel ==
Pulp

- Jarvis Cocker: vocals, guitar
- Simon Hinkler: bass, piano, guitar, mandolin
- Peter Boam: guitar, keyboards, piano
- David Hinkler: keyboards, trombone
- Wayne Furniss: guitar, bass
- Garry Wilson (credited as "Beefy Garry O"): drums

Additional musicians

- Mister Barry Thompson: flute, clarinet
- Jill Taylor: backing vocals
- Saskia Cocker: backing vocals
- Jon Short: cello
- Joanne, Julie and Alison: chatter and recorders

Artwork

- Tony Perrin
