= Pulp (band) =

British rock band

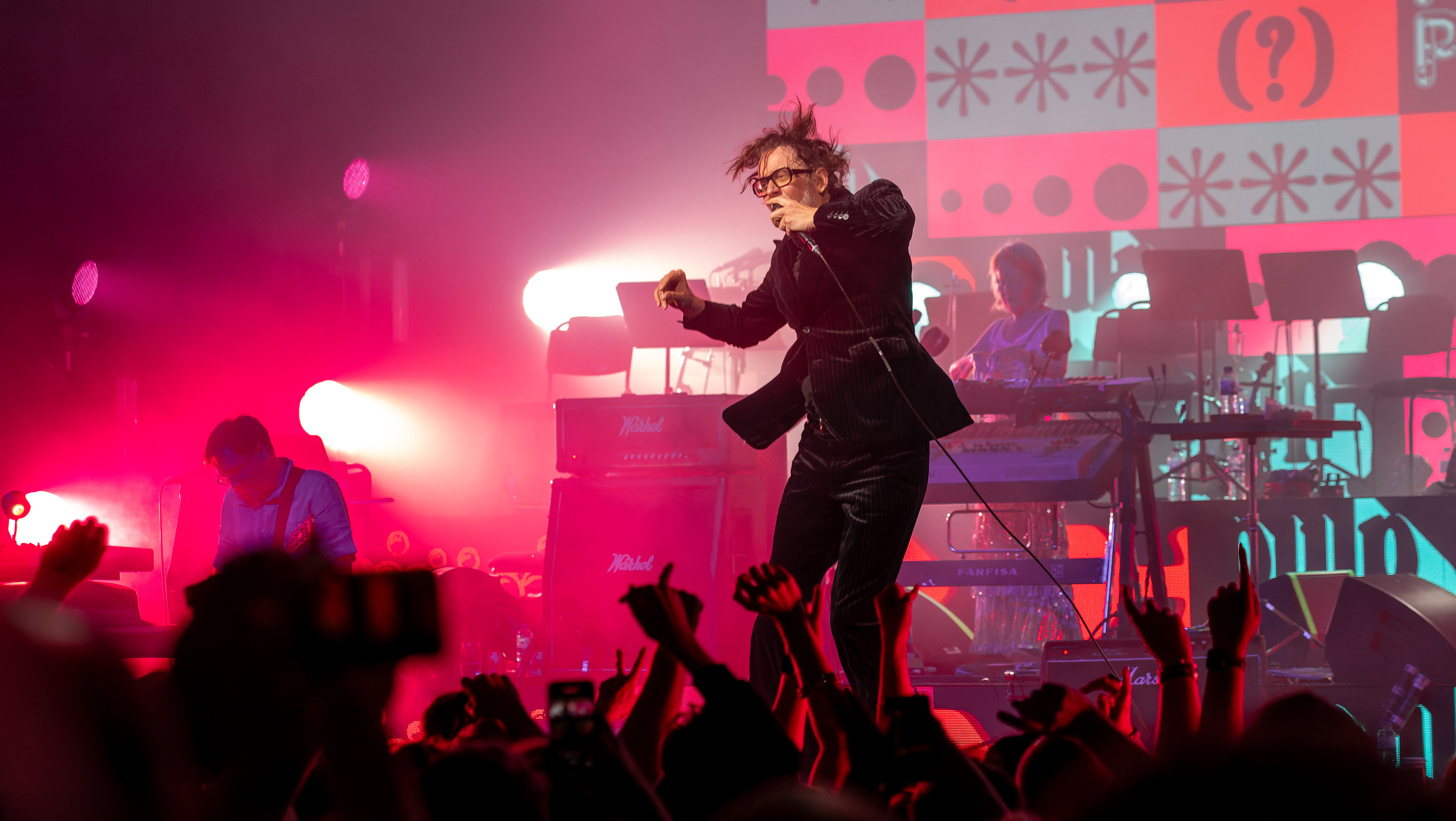
- Pulp performing at the Hammersmith Apollo in 2023

Background information
- Origin: Sheffield, South Yorkshire, England
- Genres: Britpop; art rock; indie pop; post-punk; indie rock; alternative rock
- Works: Discography
- Years active: 1978–2002; 2011–2013; 2022–2026
- Labels: Rough Trade; Red Rhino; Fire; Island
- Spinoffs: Relaxed Muscle; Venini
- Members: Jarvis Cocker; Candida Doyle; Nick Banks; Mark Webber
- Past members: Russell Senior; Steve Mackey; See Band members section for others
- Website: welovepulp.info

Pulp are an English rock band formed in Sheffield in 1978. At their critical and commercial peak, the band consisted of Jarvis Cocker (vocals, guitar, keyboards), Russell Senior (guitar, violin), Candida Doyle (keyboards), Nick Banks (drums, percussion), Steve Mackey (bass) and Mark Webber (guitar, keyboards). The band's "kitchen sink drama" lyrics, coupled with its references to British culture, led to Cocker and Pulp becoming reluctant figureheads of the Britpop movement.

The band struggled to find success during the 1980s, but gained UK prominence in the mid-1990s first with His 'n' Hers (1994), which was nominated for the Mercury Music Prize. Its follow-up, Different Class (1995), won the Mercury Prize, reached number one on the UK Albums Chart and spawned four top ten singles, including the number two hits "Common People" and "Mis-Shapes/Sorted for E's & Wizz". The band's sixth album, This Is Hardcore (1998), also debuted at number one in the UK and was nominated for the Mercury Prize. At their peak, Pulp headlined the Pyramid Stage of the Glastonbury Festival twice and were regarded among the Britpop "big four", along with Blur, Oasis and Suede.

The band released We Love Life in 2001 and then took a decade-long break, having sold more than 10 million records. Pulp reunited in 2011 to play multiple festivals and released "After You" in 2013, their first song in 12 years. The band reunited a second time in 2022 to tour once again, and later released their eighth album More in June 2025. More was released to "universal acclaim" and commercial success, becoming Pulp's first No.1 album since This Is Hardcore. They appeared at Glastonbury in 2025, returning to the Pyramid Stage as a surprise act to critical acclaim.

== History ==
=== Early years: 1978–1983 ===
Pulp were formed in 1978 at The City School in Sheffield by Jarvis Cocker, then 15 years old, and Peter Dalton, then 14. Cocker's original preference was to name the band after the film Pulp starring Michael Caine, though it was decided that this was too short. Instead, the two took inspiration from a copy of the Financial Times which listed the Arabicas coffee bean in its commodity index. Cocker and Dalton used this, with a slight spelling change, and the band became "Arabicus". Early rehearsals took place in Cocker's house and featured Cocker, Dalton and Dalton's younger brother Ian. After finally deciding on "Arabicus Pulp", a fixed line-up was then established: Cocker, Dalton and two friends of theirs, David "Fungus" Lockwood and Mark Swift. The band played their first public gig at Rotherham Arts Centre in July 1980. Later that year, Cocker met future member Russell Senior, who recognised Cocker from his charismatic sales techniques in his part-time job at the local fish market.

Pulp's musical style at this time was varied, approximately described as "a cross between ABBA and the Fall". A local fanzine also noted this eclecticism, describing them as sounding "as if they listen to the John Peel show every night in an endless quest for influences". Indeed, in October 1981, they gave a demo tape to Peel, who granted them a Peel Session. The session was a giant leap forward for the young band, who became well known on the local music scene as a result. The tracks recorded were in the typical Sheffield sound of the time (cf. the Human League and Comsat Angels): electronic new wave and post-punk. These tracks were released in 2006 on The Peel Sessions compilation.

Despite their exposure on national radio, success was not forthcoming and, apart from Cocker, most of the core line-up left for university. Soon, a new set of musicians were gathered: Simon Hinkler (who later joined the Mission), David Hinkler, Wayne Furniss (who switched to guitar after playing drums in the previous lineup), Peter Boam, Gary Wilson, and Cocker's sister, Saskia. They managed to get enough local backing to record a mini-album in late 1982, entitled It (the title was a pun on pulpit, as if the band were preaching to the audience), which was released in April 1983 by Red Rhino Records. This largely consisted of folkish, romantic pop songs influenced by Leonard Cohen and was a change of direction from the Peel Sessions two years earlier. The album was later released by Cherry Red Records.

Though It failed commercially and fame was still elusive, the band continued to seek commercial success even to the point of recording a single, "Everybody's Problem"/"There Was". The single demonstrated a style shift advised by Red Rhino's Tony Perrin who had convinced Cocker that he "could write commercial songs like Wham!". This approach also failed and the It lineup soon dissolved.

=== Fire Records era: 1983–1992 ===
Around this time, Cocker had become involved in an experimental theatre/performance art company organised by Russell Senior; the two soon began writing and rehearsing music together, eventually enlisting fellow performance artist Magnus Doyle to play drums. As Senior recounted, this was for all intents and purposes a new project, related to Cocker's previous band in name only:

We had a discussion on what to call the new band, Jarvis didn't like the name of my previous psychobilly band the Nightmares, and I quite liked the name Pulp but didn't particularly want to be associated with it. We tried sticking a pin in a dictionary but all the names were rubbish and he persuaded me that keeping the name Pulp would bring a few people in, so it stuck.

With the eventual addition of bassist Peter "Manners" Mansell and occasional keyboardist/engineer Tim Allcard, this new incarnation of Pulp survived a number of ill-fated gigs (including one at a rugby club at Brunel University which ended in a riot) before Allcard left to be replaced on keyboards by Doyle's sister Candida in 1984. At her first gig with the band, in a London pub, Pulp were scouted by their soon-to-be label, the fledgling indie Fire Records. Soon after signing, in November 1985, Cocker fell out of a window while trying to impress a girl with a Spider-Man impression and ended up in hospital, temporarily requiring the use of a wheelchair in which he appeared during concerts.

Fire released the singles "Little Girl" (1985), "Dogs Are Everywhere" (1986), and "They Suffocate at Night" (1987) before finally releasing the band's next LP Freaks (1987), recorded in one week on a budget of £600 due to record label pressure. Cocker was irritated, and remarked that "the songs could've been done a lot better if we'd have had a bit more time...". The release of Freaks had been delayed for a year, in which time the band's lineup had largely destabilised, the most notable fluctuations being the departures of Mansell and both Doyles and the addition of drummer Nick Banks (though Candida Doyle would soon rejoin the band on a long-term basis after a couple of brief absences). With the album emerging to minimal label promotion and only moving a few hundred copies, and the initial Fire contract having wound down, Pulp recorded demos of newer, more pop-oriented material with Chakk's label FON in Sheffield. A single called "Death Comes To Town" was due to be released by FON in early 1988, but this relationship disintegrated and the release was cancelled. Pulp would play two notable gigs in Sheffield that year, including the high-concept "Day That Never Happened" show at The Leadmill in August; the same night of this event, however, Cocker informed Senior that he was leaving for London to study film, having been accepted to Central Saint Martins College of Art and Design and had his fill of struggling to move the band's career forward.

Though Cocker's relocation and frustrated attitude seemed to spell a natural endpoint for Pulp, Senior encouraged him that the time had not yet come to disband. Banks, too, recalled that the situation was discouraging but not final:

Pulp was in bits. Scattered. But, we never sat down and said, "That's it, the end, see you later." There was still a dimly flickering ember under the rubble. There was still a desire to try and keep things going – somehow. We didn't know how this was going to happen, we just thought the songs we had were too vital to let die.

Steve Mackey, a fellow Sheffielder and supportive fan, was also studying in London by this time and was asked to join as a bass player. In 1989, Fire Records approached Cocker about re-signing Pulp, promising a £10,000 recording budget; still wary from their prior experience with the label, the band booked FON's studio and producer Alan Smyth once again in hopes that they could use Fire's studio advance without actually formalising a new deal. Under this arrangement, Pulp commenced work on what would ultimately become their next LP Separations. Upon completing the album, with no discernible interest from any other label, the band reluctantly agreed to re-sign with Fire Records. As with Freaks, the label would delay the release of Separations considerably, sitting on the album until 1992.

In the meantime, however, in 1991, the "My Legendary Girlfriend" 12-inch became NME's single of the week. Stuart Maconie described it in his review as "a throbbing ferment of nightclub soul and teen opera". Another 1991 single, "Countdown," began to be mentioned in the mainstream press, and in October of that year, the band played its first overseas gig, a concert organised by French magazine Les Inrockuptibles. Frustrated by what they viewed as a still intractable situation with Fire, Pulp worked with their new manager Suzanne Catty to drum up interest from major-label A&Rs in London; an arrangement was reached for interested suitor Island Records to informally fund a few singles on Warp Records imprint Gift in order to bolster Pulp's indie profile while testing the commercial waters with a larger production budget. "O.U." was thus released by Gift in June 1992 (the same month Separations would finally see release on Fire); when Island learned of the band's heretofore unrevealed contractual obligation to Fire Records, however, further funding was withheld for fear of legal action, causing Cocker to seek a £5,000 loan from his family in order to keep Gift's planned release of "Babies" on schedule for October. Amid the stress and ambiguity of this episode, the band severed ties with Catty and soon took on the services of Rough Trade's management arm, who would successfully negotiate Pulp's release from Fire to Island Records under condition of the smaller label receiving a portion of the band's future major-label earnings.

The band would later look back on its experiences with Fire Records as a disillusioning time, citing problems like poor promotion, lack of adequate distribution, and a failure to coordinate release schedules with Pulp's live activity; both Cocker and Senior confessed after the fact that the band agreed to the initial Fire deal because it "was the only offer on the table."

Upon his own reflection, Banks took a slightly more equivocal stance on the label situation during this period:

[Fire] did put out Pulp records when nobody else wanted to. OK, they were often months and years after they were recorded and almost all of them garnered zero sales, airplay, or interest but they were the only people to invest any money in Pulp for a long time. It is very easy to see that Pulp could have floundered in the mid and late eighties due to lack of interest. Is a band even a band without being able to release music? At least with Fire something was coming out. Just.

=== Commercial height: 1993–1996 ===
"Do You Remember the First Time?"
"Do You Remember the First Time?" was one of the preceding releases to His 'n' Hers. To promote the release a short film was produced featuring loss of virginity stories from celebrities including Justine Frischmann, Jo Brand and John Peel.

After one final Gift single in February 1993 with "Razzmatazz," Island would fully take over releasing, with "Lipgloss" and the band's first UK top 40 hit "Do You Remember the First Time?" These singles were followed by the Ed Buller-produced album His 'n' Hers (1994), which reached number nine on the UK Albums Chart and was nominated for the Mercury Music Prize.

This sudden increase in popularity was helped by the massive media interest in Britpop alongside acts such as Suede, Oasis and Blur, with Pulp supporting the latter in a 1994 tour of the United States. 1995 saw the peak of Pulp's fame, with the release of their number two single on the UK Singles Chart, "Common People", in May 1995 and their performance in June at the Glastonbury Festival (standing in for The Stone Roses at the last minute). A double A-side single, "Sorted for E's & Wizz/Mis-Shapes", was to precede the release of their next album, Different Class (1995). Upon the release of "Sorted for E's and Wizz", the Daily Mirror printed a front-page story headed "BAN THIS SICK STUNT" alongside a story by Kate Thornton which said the song was "pro-drugs" and called for the single to be banned. The single had an inlay which showed how to conceal amphetamines in a DIY 'wrap'. Cocker released a statement two days later saying: "...'Sorted' is not a pro-drugs song. Nowhere on the sleeve does it say you are supposed to put drugs in here but I understand the confusion. I don't think anyone who listens to 'Sorted' would come away thinking it had a pro-drugs message." The single reached number two on the UK Singles Charts.

Released in October 1995, Different Class garnered significant critical praise and debuted at the top of the UK Album Chart. This was the first album featuring Pulp fan-club president Mark Webber, who became a permanent member of the band on guitar and keyboards. The album followed similar themes to their previous work with observations of life expressed through Cocker's sexualised, sometimes dark and witty lyrics. Other singles released from Different Class were "Disco 2000" and "Something Changed", which reached numbers seven and ten respectively in the UK. In September 1996, Different Class won the Mercury Music Prize.

It was at this time that Cocker gained significant media exposure due to a notorious prank at the 1996 BRIT Awards, where he invaded the stage in protest during pop singer Michael Jackson's performance of "Earth Song" and "wiggled his backside" at the audience. After complaints by Jackson and his entourage, Cocker spent the night in Kensington Police Station, having been arrested on suspicion of actual bodily harm and assaulting the child performers. However, with British comedian and former solicitor Bob Mortimer acting as legal representation, he was released without charge. This incident propelled Cocker into great controversy in the UK and elsewhere, and Pulp's record sales soared as a result. The event also coincided with the beginning of their first arena tour and the Daily Mirror, who had attacked the band months earlier, set up a "Justice for Jarvis" campaign backing his actions and carried out a stunt at Pulp's Sheffield Arena gig on 29 February, handing out free T-shirts. The NME described Cocker's actions as a "great publicity stunt" which was "creative, subversive and very, very funny", while Melody Maker described Cocker as, "arguably the Fifth Most Famous Man in Britain" and suggested he should be knighted.

In March 1996, a compilation of Pulp's early recordings on Fire Records entitled Countdown 1992–1983 was released on the Nectar Masters label. It received largely negative reviews, but due to the band's popularity at the time it reached the top 10 of the UK charts. Cocker, whose permission was not sought before release, urged fans not to purchase the album, comparing it to "a garish old family photograph album". Later in 1996, Pulp gained minor international recognition on the back of the inclusion of the track "Mile End" on the Trainspotting soundtrack. In August, the band played their last public performance for almost two years as headliners of the 1996 V Festival.

=== Until break-up: 1996–2002 ===
"This Is Hardcore"
"This Is Hardcore" was released as the second single from their 1998 album This Is Hardcore. Its style is a marked difference from their previous two albums. Its minimal sound and subject matter is reminiscent of earlier, pre-Britpop tracks such as "Sheffield: Sex City".

It was during this period of intense fame and tabloid scrutiny that longtime member and major innovator in the band's sound Russell Senior decided to leave the band, saying, "it wasn't creatively rewarding to be in Pulp anymore". The band were due to begin working on a new album in late 1996. However, Cocker was having difficulty with the celebrity lifestyle, battling cocaine addiction and a break-up of a long-term relationship. When the band came to begin work on the next album, they had only one song – "Help the Aged". This creative inertia meant the band took over a year to finish the next record. Indeed, it was Cocker's disillusionment with his long-desired wish for fame that made up much of the subject matter of This Is Hardcore, which was released in March 1998. The album took a darker and more challenging tone than that of Different Class and lyrical topics – pornography (the title track), fame ("Glory Days") and the after effects of drugs ("The Fear") – were dealt with more earnestly than on previous records. Also in 1998, Pulp collaborated with Patrick Doyle on the song "Like A Friend" for the soundtrack to the film Great Expectations. The song was also used in the Adult Swim cartoon The Venture Bros. season 4 finale "Operation: P.R.O.M."

Pulp then spent a few years "in the wilderness" before reappearing in 2001 with a new album, We Love Life. The extended period between the release of This is Hardcore and We Love Life is partly attributed to having initially recorded the songs which comprise the album and being dissatisfied with the results. Subsequent interviews also suggested interpersonal and artistic differences, including managing the fallout of the Britpop/Different Class era. Singer/songwriter Scott Walker agreed to produce the record and this symbolised a new phase in Pulp's development. This new effort fell short of expectations and was to be Pulp's last album for 24 years.

Pulp subsequently undertook a tour of the National Parks in the UK, even playing a show as far north as Elgin in Scotland. Richard Hawley, the Sheffield-based singer/songwriter, was also present on various dates on this tour. He later described it as "very much pink feather boas and glamour which was great and brilliant. That was about trying to find glamour among all the shit and I loved all that". In 2002 the band announced that they were leaving their label, Island. A greatest hits package was released: Hits, with one new track. It is unclear whether this was the band's decision or released to satisfy contractual agreements. A music festival, Auto, was organised (held at Rotherham's Magna centre) where they played their last gig before embarking on a 9-year hiatus.

=== After break-up: 2003–2010 ===
Cocker was involved in a number of one-offs and side projects, including the group Relaxed Muscle with Jason Buckle and the film Harry Potter and the Goblet of Fire, where he fronted a group which included Steve Mackey and members of Radiohead. In 2006 he collaborated with Air, Neil Hannon and Charlotte Gainsbourg on her album entitled 5:55. In 2007 he appeared on Air's album Pocket Symphony, co-writing and giving vocals to the tracks "One Hell of a Party" and "The Duelist". His first solo album, Jarvis, with the participation of Mackey, was released to critical acclaim in November 2006. Candida Doyle has performed live with Cocker on his solo tours. Mackey produced tracks on the debut album by M.I.A., Arular, and on Someone to Drive You Home by the Long Blondes, both of which were critically well received. He has also produced tracks for Bromheads Jacket and Florence + The Machine.

On 11 September 2006 the band re-released three of their albums (His 'n' Hers, Different Class, and This Is Hardcore), each with a bonus disc of B-sides, demos and rarities. On 23 October 2006 a 2-CD set compiling all of Pulp's John Peel Sessions from 1982 to 2001 was released.

=== First reunion: 2011–2013 ===
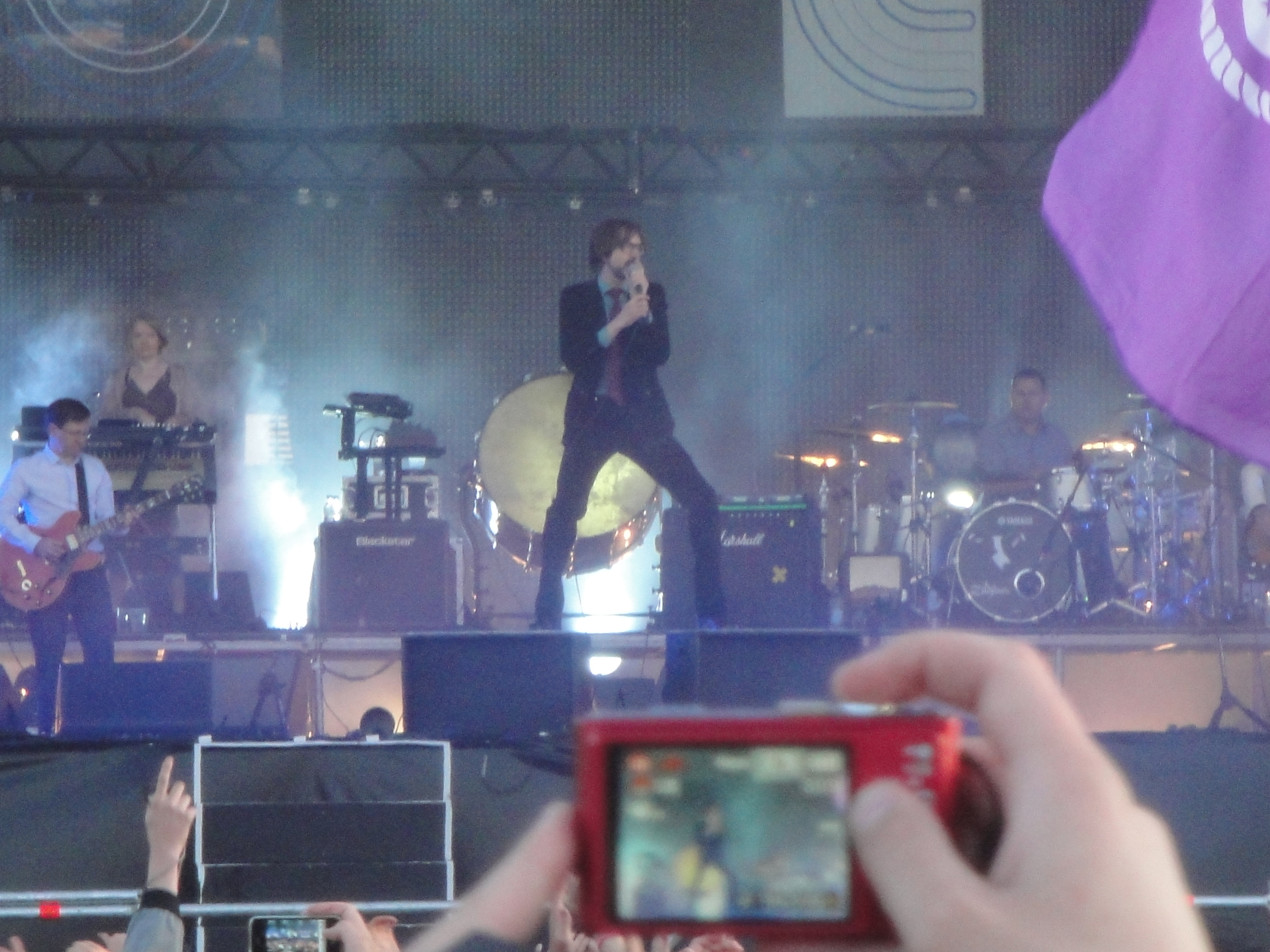
Pulp performing in 2011: (Left to right) guitarist Mark Webber, keyboardist Candida Doyle, singer Jarvis Cocker and drummer Nick Banks

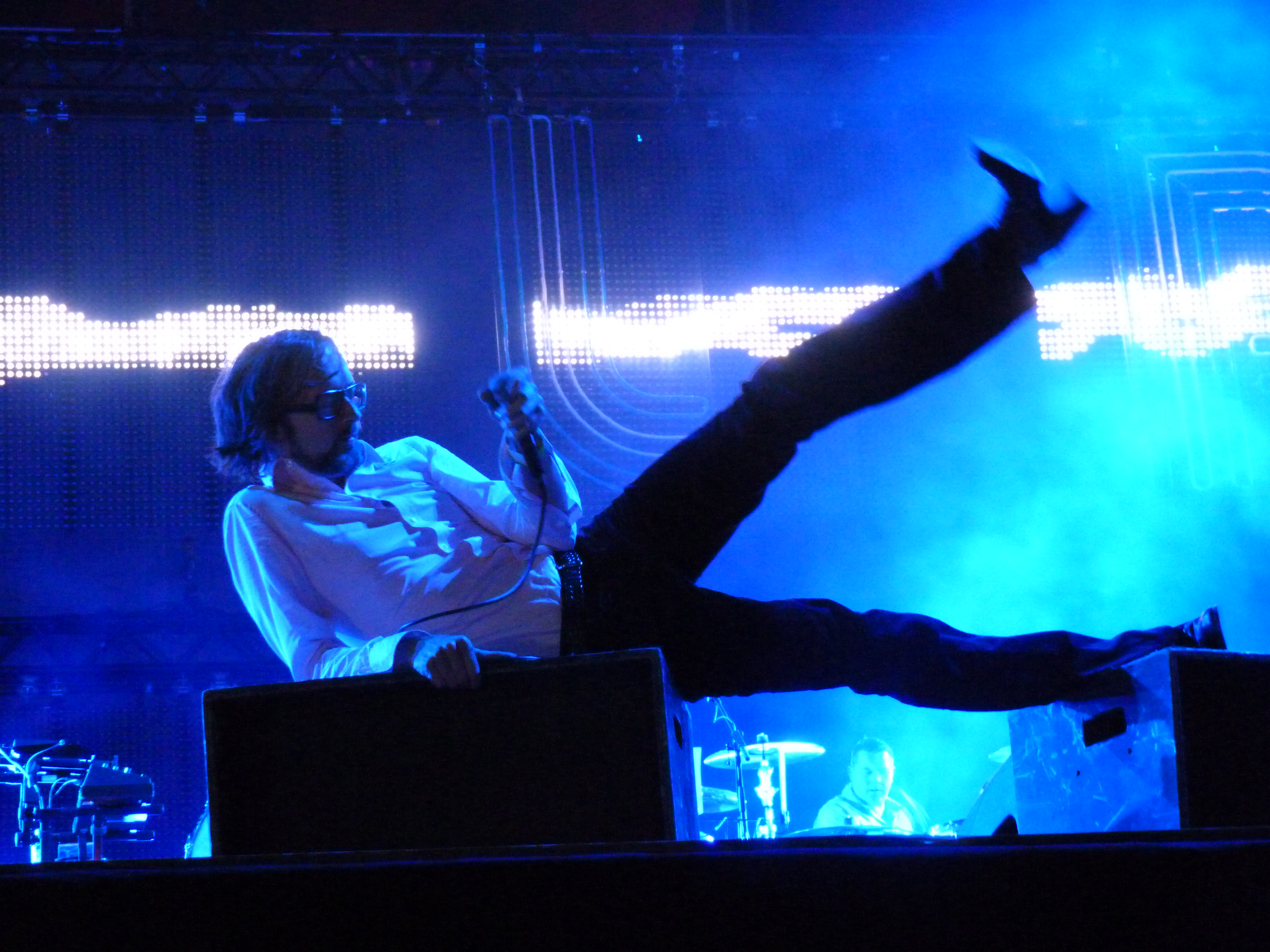
Jarvis Cocker at the Sziget Festival in Budapest with Pulp in 2011

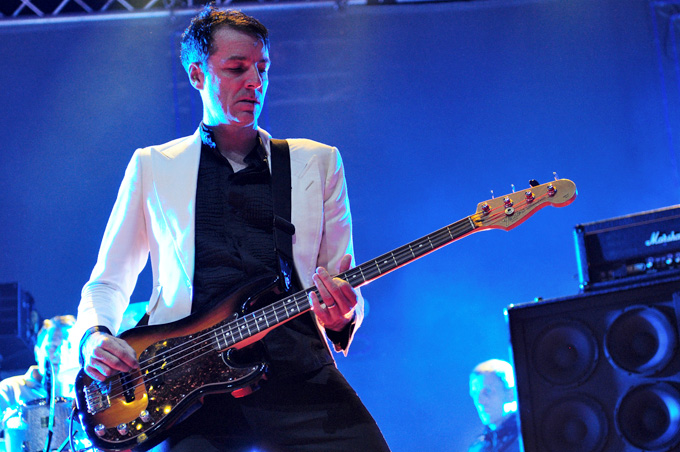
Bassist Steve Mackey performing with Pulp at On the Bright Side in Perth in 2011

In November 2010 it was announced that the Different Class line-up (Cocker, Banks, Doyle, Mackey, Senior and Webber) would be playing at the Wireless festival in London's Hyde Park and a Saturday slot at the Isle of Wight Festival in 2011. In a message sent to the band's official mailing list on 1 January 2011, Cocker said the large amount of interest in the band's reunion had been "an inspiration," and that he was pleased with how rehearsals were going.

The band announced 22 concerts between May and September 2011, taking place in Europe and Australia. Pulp were one of the surprise special guests at Glastonbury Festival 2011 in June where they played on The Park stage on Saturday evening. They performed at the Sziget Festival in Hungary on 10 August, Way Out West Festival in Sweden on 13 August, and played as co-headliners to The Strokes at the Reading Festival and the Leeds Festival during the final weekend of August 2011. They headlined the Electric Picnic on 4 September, their last festival of the year. On 9 January 2012, the Coachella festival line-up was released, with Pulp listed as part of the line-up. Further dates were announced, including North and South America and a concert at the Royal Albert Hall in support of the Teenage Cancer Trust. Senior did not take part in the 2012 gigs.

In February 2012, It, Freaks and Separations (the albums released by Fire Records) were re-issued. These editions came with bonus tracks, including "Death Goes to the Disco", "Dogs Are Everywhere" and "Sink or Swim".

Cocker told ShortList magazine in April 2012 that he was working on ideas for new Pulp songs, but in November he told Q that the band had no plans to release new material and would be "cruising off into the sunset" at the end of the year, signalling a possible end to the reunion.

The band played a one-off concert in their hometown of Sheffield in December that year, at the 13,500 capacity Motorpoint Arena and made a previously unreleased track, "After You", available for download to those who had attended the concert. It was subsequently released to the general public in January 2013 via digital download. The song had previously only existed in demo form. Their last performance was to promote the song on The Jonathan Ross Show on 9 February 2013.

In May 2015, a music heritage plaque was unveiled at the venue of the band's first gig, The Leadmill, Sheffield. Band members Jarvis Cocker, Nick Banks, Steve Mackey, Candida Doyle and Mark Webber were present at the ceremony.

=== Second reunion: 2022–present ===
In July 2022, following speculation from a cryptic Instagram post, Cocker announced that the band would reunite for a series of concerts in 2023. Nick Banks also tweeted confirming the announcement by saying "Hey folks, unsurprisingly it's has all gone a bit mental on here. Gig details will be revealed as and when. Stay calm, hug your #pulp records and dream of going mental sometime in 2023."

The reunion was officially confirmed on 28 October 2022, with dates announced at Finsbury Park, TRNSMT, Latitude Festival as well as two homecoming shows at Sheffield Arena. Steve Mackey announced on his Instagram that he would not be taking part in the tour but stated; "Wishing Candy, Nick, Mark and Jarvis the very best with forthcoming performances in the UK and also an enormous thanks to Pulp's amazing fanbase, many of whom have sent me lovely messages today". On 2 March 2023, the band announced that Mackey had died at the age of 56.

For the reunion tour, the band were joined by Andrew McKinney on bass, Emma Smith on guitar and violin, and Adam Betts on keyboards, guitar, and percussion. The tour also featured a ten-piece string section called the Elysian Collective. During this tour they also debuted two new songs; "Hymn of the North" and "Background Noise". The reunion continued into 2024 with a North America tour which began in September. During this leg they debuted three more new songs: "Spike Island", "My Sex" and "Farmer's Market".

On 12 December 2024, the band announced that they had signed with Rough Trade Records, which had managed the band previously.

Pulp released More, their first album since 2001, on 6 June 2025. "Spike Island", the album's first single, was released on 10 April, and the second single "Got to Have Love" was released on 22 May. Later in the month they played a surprise set at Glastonbury, 30 years after their first appearance there. To keep the show under wraps, the slot was scheduled under the name 'Patchwork', and Candida Doyle was quoted as saying beforehand that the festival's organisers "weren’t interested” in booking the band. The band then embarked on the Here Comes More Tour in support of the album, their most extensive tour since the 1990s. Like with the album, the tour received overwhelmingly positive reviews.

Later in 2025, the band announced an EP, The Man Comes Around, to be released on 27 February 2026. The EP contained a cover of the Johnny Cash song of the same name as well as two tracks that were recorded during the More sessions.

The band were scheduled to play at the free opening night concert of the Adelaide Festival in Adelaide, Australia, on 27 February 2026. They had been ready to pull out after Australian writer Randa Abdel-Fattah's invitation to Adelaide Writers' Week was withdrawn in January, but committed to playing after a new festival board was appointed after the boycott of the festival and had apologised to the writer, and played the opening gig.

In June 2026, the band announced a new concert documentary film, What Do You Do for an Encore?, which chronicles the band's 40-year long history and their two sold-out shows at London's 02 Arena in June 2025. It was directed by Garth Jennings and narrated by Cocker. It was released in UK and Ireland cinemas for one-night only on 18 September. Alongside the film, a live album capturing the band's 02 performances, titled Live!, was released on 28 August.

During the band's 5 September 2026 performance at the End of the Road Festival, Cocker said it would be the band's last show for a while as Pulp played several B-sides and rarities for the first time in decades.

== Band members ==
Current members

- Jarvis Cocker – lead vocals, guitar, keyboards (1978–2002, 2011–2013, 2022–present)
- Candida Doyle – keyboards, organ, backing vocals (1984–1986, 1987–2002, 2011–2013, 2022–present)
- Nick Banks – drums, percussion (1986–2002, 2011–2013, 2022–present)
- Mark Webber – guitar, keyboards (1995–2002, 2011–2013, 2022–present; touring musician 1991–1995)

Touring musicians

- Andrew McKinney – bass (2023–present)
- Emma Smith – violin, guitar, backing vocals (2023–present)
- Adam Betts – percussion, guitar, keyboards, backing vocals (2023–present)
- Richard Jones – viola, keyboards, guitar, backing vocals (2023–present)
- Jason Buckle – guitar, percussion, backing vocals (2024–present)

Former members

- Steve Mackey – bass (1988–2002, 2011–2013; died 2023)
- Russell Senior – guitar, violin, backing and occasional lead vocals (1983–1997, 2011)
- Peter Dalton – guitar, keyboards, backing vocals (1978–1982)
- Ian Dalton – percussion (1978–1979)
- David "Fungus" Lockwood – bass (1979)
- Mark Swift – drums, percussion (1979–1980)
- Philip Thompson – bass (1979–1980)
- Jimmy Sellars – drums (1980–1981)
- Jamie Pinchbeck – bass (1980–1982)
- Wayne Furniss – drums, guitar, bass (1981–1982)
- David Hinkler – keyboards, organ, trombone, guitar (1982–1983)
- Simon Hinkler – bass, guitar, keyboards, piano (1982–1983), drums (1986)
- Peter Boam – bass, guitar, drums, keyboards (1982–1983; died 2006)
- Magnus Doyle – drums, keyboards, guitar (1983–1986)
- Peter Mansell – bass, backing vocals (1983–1986)
- Tim Allcard – keyboards, saxophone, poetry, drums (1983–1984)
- Michael Paramore – drums, percussion (1983)
- Steven Havenhand – bass (1986–1988)
- Captain Sleep – keyboards (1986–1987)
- Antony Genn – bass (1988)

Former touring musicians

- Saskia Cocker – backing vocals (1982–1983, 2012)
- Jill Taylor – backing vocals (1982–1983, 2012)
- Garry Wilson – drums (1982–1983)
- Richard Hawley – guitar (1998–2002, 2011–2012; guest 2023)
- Leo Abrahams – guitar (2011–2013)
- Jean Cook – violin (2012)

== Discography ==
- It (1983)
- Freaks (1987)
- Separations (1992)
- His 'n' Hers (1994)
- Different Class (1995)
- This Is Hardcore (1998)
- We Love Life (2001)
- More (2025)

== Awards and nominations ==
Award	Year	Category	Nominee(s)	Result	Ref.
Brit Awards	1996	British Group	Themselves	Nominated	
Brit Awards	1996	British Album of the Year	Different Class	Nominated	
Brit Awards	1996	British Single of the Year	"Common People"	Nominated	
Brit Awards	1996	British Video of the Year	"Common People"	Nominated	
D&AD Awards	1996	Pop Promo Videos: Direction	"Disco 2000"	Graphite Pencil	
Ivor Novello Awards	1996	Best Song Musically and Lyrically	"Common People"	Won	
Ivor Novello Awards	1999	Best Song Musically and Lyrically	"A Little Soul"	Nominated	
Ivor Novello Awards	2017	Outstanding Song Collection	Themselves	Won	
MTV Europe Music Awards	1996	Best Song	"Disco 2000"	Nominated	
MTV Europe Music Awards	1996	Best Group	Themselves	Nominated	
MTV Europe Music Awards	1996	Best New Act	Themselves	Nominated	
MVPA Awards	1998	Best International Video	"Help the Aged"	Won	
Mercury Prize	1994	Album of the Year	His 'n' Hers	Nominated	
Mercury Prize	1996	Album of the Year	Different Class	Won	
Mercury Prize	1998	Album of the Year	This Is Hardcore	Nominated	
Mercury Prize	2025	Album of the Year	More	Nominated	
NME Awards	1996	Best Band	Themselves	Nominated	
NME Awards	1996	Best Live Act	Themselves	Won	
NME Awards	1996	Best Video	"Common People"	Won	
NME Awards	1996	Best Single	"Common People"	Nominated	
NME Awards	1996	Best Single	"Sorted for E's & Wizz"	Nominated	
NME Awards	1996	Best Album	Different Class	Nominated	
NME Awards	1997	Best Band	Themselves	Nominated	
NME Awards	1999	Best Band	Themselves	Nominated	
NME Awards	1999	Best Album	This Is Hardcore	Nominated	
NME Awards	1999	Best Single	"This is Hardcore"	Nominated	
NME Awards	2012	Outstanding Contribution to Music	Themselves	Won	
NME Awards	2012	Best Live Band	Themselves	Nominated	
NME Awards	2012	Greatest Music Moment of the Year	Themselves	Nominated	
NME Awards	2015	Best Music Film	A Film About Life, Death And Supermarkets	Won	
Q Awards	1996	Best Live Act	Themselves	Won	
Q Awards	1998	Best Live Act	Themselves	Nominated	
Q Awards	1998	Best Album	This Is Hardcore	Nominated	
Q Awards	2012	Inspiration Award	Themselves	Won	
Smash Hits Poll Winners Party	1996	Best Indie-Type Band	Themselves	Nominated	

== Legacy and influence ==
Pulp are widely regarded as one of the most influential bands of the Britpop era, not only for their chart success but also for their sharp social commentary and literary lyricism. Jarvis Cocker, in particular, became an unlikely sex symbol and cultural provocateur, offering an intellectual and satirical counterweight to the laddish masculinity of contemporaries like Oasis. Their 1995 hit "Common People" is frequently cited as one of the defining anthems of 1990s Britain and has been featured in numerous "greatest songs" lists. The band's exploration of class, hedonism, and alienation resonated beyond their time, influencing artists such as Franz Ferdinand, Arctic Monkeys, and The Divine Comedy. Music critics have praised Pulp’s ability to blend pop accessibility with literary sensibility, making them a standout act in British music history.
