= Party Hard (Pulp song) =

Single by Pulp

from the album This Is Hardcore
- Released: 7 September 1998
- Recorded: 1997
- Genre: Dance-rock; funk
- Length: 4:00
- Label: Island
- Songwriters: Nick Banks, Jarvis Cocker, Candida Doyle, Steve Mackey and Mark Webber
- Producer: Chris Thomas

Pulp singles chronology
"A Little Soul" (1998)	"Party Hard" (1998)	"Sunrise" / "The Trees" (2001)

"Party Hard" is a song by British alternative rock band Pulp. Featuring David Bowie-inspired vocals, the song lyrically was inspired by the band's dissatisfaction and exhaustion with clubbing.

"Party Hard" was released as the fourth single from This Is Hardcore, reaching number 29 in the UK. The single was accompanied by a music video inspired by kitschy German variety shows.

== Lyrics and music ==
Rolling Stone's Greg Kot described the song as "about aging nightclubbers driving themselves to the brink of exhaustion to feel more 'alive'". Sean Plummer of Access Magazine called the song a "cynical anthem," while Vivi McCarthy of Deluxe Magazine said the song "explores the notion of your social life as a competitive sport, complete with injuries and of course, doping."

This song is marked by Jarvis Cocker's David Bowie-esque vocal performance. Michael Krugman of Ray Gun wrote, "The ironic 'Party Hard' sees Jarvis at his most Bowie-esque, as the band boogie down at the Scary Monsters disco."

== Release ==
"Party Hard" was released on 7 September 1998 as the fourth and final single from the album This Is Hardcore, charting at number 29 in the UK Singles Chart, a commercial disappointment for the band, fuelled by CD2 accidentally containing remixes that were too long for the recently introduced chart-eligibility regulations. Nigel Coxon explained, "I love 'Party Hard', it was as obvious a single on the record as anything, and it's a brilliant live track as well ... to be honest it would have been hard whatever we put out after 'Hardcore.' The album was ... falling off and things had moved on, and I think whatever we'd have put out as a single would've struggled."

B-side "We Are the Boyz" was written for the 1998 film Velvet Goldmine.

== Music video ==
The release of "Party Hard" was accompanied by a music video produced by Hammer & Tongs. The video featured girls wearing tight Pulp T-shirts dancing around Cocker as the band mimed the song. The dance routine was recreated by Pulp during their performance of the song on Top of the Pops. Director Mike Mills recalled that the video was inspired by a tape of an old German variety show that the band had shown him.

During live performances of the period, balloons would be dropped on the audience during the song in reference to the song's music video.

== Track listing ==
All lyrics are written by Jarvis Cocker; all music is composed by Nick Banks, Jarvis Cocker, Candida Doyle, Steve Mackey and Mark Webber.

CD one
No.	Title	Length
1.	"Party Hard"	3:56
2.	"We Are the Boyz"	3:14
3.	"The Fear" (The Complete and Utter Breakdown Version)	7:11

CD two
No.	Title	Length
1.	"Party Hard"	3:56
2.	"Party Hard" (Stretch 'n' Verns Michel Lombert Remix)	8:23
3.	"Party Hard" (All Seeing I's I Hardly Party Mix)	7:40

Cassette
No.	Title	Length
1.	"Party Hard"	3:56
2.	"Party Hard" (Stretch 'n' Verns Michel Lombert Remix)	8:23

== Personnel ==
- Jarvis Cocker – vocals
- Mark Webber – guitars
- Candida Doyle – synthesizers
- Steve Mackey – bass guitar
- Nick Banks – drums

== Charts ==
Chart (1998)	Peak position
Australia (ARIA)	90
Scottish Singles Sales (Official Charts)	30
UK Singles (Official Charts)	29
