= List of online magazines =

This is a list of historical online magazines.

- #5 Magazine
- Access Magazine
- Atlanta Magazine
- Atlas Obscura
- The Atlantic Monthly
- Artribune
- BAK
- Baseball Digest
- Best Life
- Bicycling
- Billboard
- Black Belt Magazine
- BlogCritics
- Boys' Life
- The Bulletin of the Atomic Scientists
- Cincinnati Magazine
- Consumer Reports
- DIY
- Dwell
- Ebony
- The Economist
- The European Courier
- HuffPost
- Harper's Magazine
- House to House Heart to Heart
- Indianapolis Monthly
- Indie Hoy
- Insider
- Jet
- Liberty
- Life
- Mac Life
- Maximum PC
- Men's Health
- Mida
- Mother Jones
- New York Magazine
- Newsweek
- Organic Gardening
- PC Magazine
- PC Magazine (UK)
- Popular Mechanics
- Popular Science
- Prevention Magazine
- Runner's World
- The Skeptic (Australian Skeptics)
- Skeptical Inquirer
- Spectrum
- StyleBlueprint
- Sports Illustrated
- Suitcase (magazine)
- Superinteressante
- TIME
- Tinpahar
- Toons Mag
- Undercurrents
- U.S. News & World Report
- US Weekly
- Vegetarian Times
- Veja
- Weekly World News
- White Fungus
- Windows Vista: The Official Magazine
- Women's Health
- YaleGlobal Online
- Yoga Journal
- ZIP Beep
- NthWORD
- ŽVPL

== See also ==
- Magazine
- Wikipedia:List of online newspaper archives
- List of computer magazines
- List of online image archives
