= Son of Rambow =

2007 comedy film

- UK theatrical release poster
- Directed by: Garth Jennings
- Written by: Garth Jennings
- Produced by: Nick Goldsmith
- Starring: Bill Milner; Will Poulter; Jules Sitruk; Jessica Hynes; Neil Dudgeon; Anna Wing; Ed Westwick; Eric Sykes; Chris Miles
- Cinematography: Jess Hall
- Edited by: Dominic Leung
- Music by: Joby Talbot
- Production companies: Celluloid Dreams; Hammer & Tongs; Zweites Deutsches Fernsehen; Arte France Cinéma; Soficinéma
- Distributed by: Celluloid Dreams; (Worldwide); Paramount Vantage; (Select territories); Optimum Releasing; (United Kingdom); Senator Film; (Germany)
- Release dates: 22 January 2007 (Sundance Film Festival); 4 April 2008 (United Kingdom); 21 June 2008 (Germany)
- Running time: 95 minutes
- Countries: France; United Kingdom; Germany
- Languages: English; French; German
- Budget: £4.5 million
- Box office: $10.1 million

Son of Rambow is a 2007 comedy film written and directed by Garth Jennings, inspired by First Blood. The film premiered on 22 January 2007 at the Sundance Film Festival. It was later shown at the Newport Beach Film Festival, Seattle International Film Festival, Toronto International Film Festival and Glasgow Film Festival. The film was also shown at the 51st BFI London Film Festival. Son of Rambow was released in the United Kingdom on 4 April 2008 and opened in limited release in the United States on 2 May 2008. Set over a summer in Thatcher's Britain, the film is a coming of age story about two schoolboys and their attempts to make an amateur film inspired by First Blood.

== Plot ==
Will Proudfoot is a quiet and shy 11-year-old boy from a family that belongs to the strict Plymouth Brethren church. Will is forbidden from watching films or television and is made to leave his classroom when a documentary is shown in class. In the corridor, he meets Lee Carter, the 12-year-old worst-behaved boy in school, thrown out of another class for bad behaviour. After they accidentally break a fish bowl, Lee volunteers to take the blame in exchange for Will's watch, which belonged to his dead father. Moreover, Lee demands that Will perform the stunts in a film Lee is making to enter the Screen Test Young Film-Makers' Competition.

At Lee's house, Will finds out Lee intends to use home video equipment owned by his 16-year-old bullying older brother Lawrence to make a homage to First Blood. While hiding from Lawrence, Will accidentally sees the film; becomes inspired, he joins Lee in the production. Will enthusiastically does several dangerous action scenes, culminating in the two boys becoming 'blood brothers' after Lee saves him from drowning. Lee finds Will's sketchbook and incorporates some of the ideas into his film script. The two become best friends, but Will has to keep it secret from his family and the increasingly interfering Brother Joshua of the Brethren, who has designs on his mother.

Didier Revol, a 15-year-old popular French exchange student, finds Will's sketchbook and asks to join the film, and Will agrees. This snowballs into the whole school being part of the production, and Will being included with the cool sixth-formers. Lee does not like this, as he is no longer in control. While filming the last sequence at a disused power station, their tension culminates in a fight, and Lee storms off. Due to Didier's carelessness, part of the unstable structure collapses, trapping Will. The rest of the kids, including Didier, flee the scene. Lee returns to rescue his friend. Lee gets hurt and is hospitalised. Lawrence visits Lee, but is angry about the broken camera.

Will's mother, from whom he has struggled to hide his activities, finally realises that her son must be allowed to be himself. Her family leaves the Brethren. The film is never submitted to the competition as they miss the deadline. Lawrence looks at Lee's footage and he is impressed. He also sees Lee defending him when Will condemns his behavior, which was accidentally filmed. With Will's help, Lawrence adds a part in which he acts himself – including a message for his brother.

When Lee leaves the hospital, he is brought to a cinema. His film is shown before the main feature (much to the enjoyment of the audience) and the two boys reconcile.

== Cast ==
- Bill Milner as William "Will" Proudfoot, is an 11-year-old boy who belongs to a strict Plymouth Brethren church. He is shy, quiet, innocent, polite, withdrawn, and imaginative, due to his upbringing in a strict religious sect that forbids worldly influences like television. While filming the movie with Lee Carter, Will becomes more outgoing and self-assured, experiencing a newfound freedom and a great friendship.
- Will Poulter as Lee Carter, is a 12-year-old boy who misbehaves at school. He's mischievous, rebellious, troublemaker, violent, rude, unfriendly, a street bully, conceited, and impulsive, constantly seeking recognition for himself and his neglectful older brother, Lawrence, with whom he has a strained relationship. He has no friends and spends his time harassing the teachers, who consider him a threat. Upon meeting Will, he begins to bully him and even manipulates him to ensure Lee doesn't receive any punishment at school. He then tells Will that he's making a movie about Rambo, which is why he chooses Will as the lead, and they gradually become good friends.
- Neil Dudgeon as Brother Joshua
- Adam Godley as Brethren Leader
- Jessica Hynes as Mary Proudfoot, Will's mother.
  - Imogen Aboud as young Mary
- Anna Wing as Grandma, Will's grandmother.
- Charlie Thrift as Duncan Miller, Will's classmate.
- Zofia Brooks as Tina
- Tallulah Evans as Jess Proudfoot, Will's youngest sister.
- Jules Sitruk as Didier Revol, is a 15-year-old French exchange student. He is charismatic, cocky, attractive, and cool, and temporarily becomes an idol and role model for the other kids. They describe him as a "punk" with no redeeming qualities, but he's seductive and appealing to the girls, and the object of envy and imitation by the boys because of his French accent and sophisticated air. Didier agreed to participate in Will's film, even though Lee initially didn't want him in it, knowing that things would go wrong if there were more main characters. In the end, he returns to France.
- Ed Westwick as Lawrence Carter, is Lee's older brother. He is 16 years old. He is a troublemaker, neglectful, irresponsible, abusive, selfish, apathetic, and a negative influence on his younger brother. He doesn't have a good relationship with Lee. He uses his brother's camera to shoot a film about Rambo, hoping to win a short film competition, which ultimately leads him to discover his younger brother's creativity. In the end, he apologizes to Lee for never supporting him and never being there for him, realizing that Lee always needed him and remarking that he was all he had.
- Eric Sykes as Frank
- Asa Butterfield as Brethren Boy
- Adam Buxton as Chemistry teacher
- Paul Ritter as Geography teacher
- Edgar Wright as Metal school teacher
- Chris Miles as Extra

== Production ==
Son of Rambow is a project that Garth Jennings and Nick Goldsmith – collectively known as Hammer & Tongs – worked on for some years. Its development was interrupted when they were asked to make The Hitchhiker's Guide to the Galaxy, and it is their second major feature film. It was inspired by Jennings' own experiences as a child in the 1980s, when video equipment first became available to the public, and the film recreates the atmosphere of an English comprehensive school of the time, using a soundtrack of both familiar and lesser-known pop tracks from the era. The film was shot primarily in the English town of Berkhamsted, and the nearby Ashridge Estate owned and managed by the National Trust for Places of Historic Interest or Natural Beauty Hertfordshire: featuring Ashlyns School and The Rex, a recently refurbished listed Art Deco cinema which had been left derelict between 1989 and 2004.

The two roads where both boys live are approximately 1,200 metres apart, being located next to Berkhamsted Castle. They are the two most exclusive residential roads in the town. The film also shot at the Richborough Power Station in Sandwich, which was then disused. The film includes a vintage clip of Jan Pinkava winning the BBC Screen Test competition. The minor role of Danny, an acolyte of Didier, a glamorous French exchange student, is played by Stanley Kubrick's grandson, Sam Kubrick-Finney. The film includes excerpts from First Blood and is endorsed by Sylvester Stallone, the star of the Rambo franchise.

== Reception ==
=== Critical response ===
Son of Rambow received generally favourable reviews from critics. On Rotten Tomatoes the film has an approval rating of 73% based on reviews from 118 critics. The site's consensus is: "Undeniable heart and charming young leads save the film's nostalgic storyline from suffering at the hands of predictability [sic]." On Metacritic the film has a score of 66 out of 100, based on 29 reviews.

Roger Ebert of the Chicago Sun-Times gave the film a positive review and wrote: "After the movie, I imagined its writer-director, Garth Jennings (The Hitchhiker's Guide to the Galaxy) being more than a little like Will, and the movie uncannily similar to one of Will's comic epics." Desson Thomson of The Washington Post wrote: "We cringe and laugh at -- and are ultimately moved by -- their clumsiness and innocence. And it endears us to the Rambo films in ways we never could have anticipated." Kimberley Jones of The Austin Chronicle called it "Funny and sweet and guaranteed to flood you with good feeling", and Ty Burr of The Boston Globe called it "an absolute delight".

David Morrell, the author who created the character of John Rambo, called it "a tender, charming story". Stallone saw the film and sent a note to the filmmakers saying he loved it.

=== Accolades ===
The film appeared on several critics' top ten lists of the best films of 2008. Both Kimberly Jones of The Austin Chronicle and Ty Burr of The Boston Globe named it their eighth best, and Marc Savlov of The Austin Chronicle named it his ninth.

The film won the Empire Award for Best Comedy. Garth Jennings was nominated for a BAFTA in the Most Promising Newcomer category. The film was named one of the Top Ten Independent Films by the National Board of Review in 2008.

== Home media ==
Son of Rambow was released on DVD and Blu-ray in the United Kingdom on 11 August 2008, and on DVD in the United States on 26 August 2008.

== Musical ==
A stage musical adaptation has been workshopped by Nuffield Southampton Theatres (NST) in association with The Other Palace in London where it was presented from 24 May to 2 June 2018. It was directed by Nuffield Southampton Theatres' Artistic Director Samuel Hodges, with music by Miranda Cooper and Nick Coler, lyrics by Cooper and Richard Marsh, and book by Marsh.
