= Levile TV =

LEVILE
- Categories: Film, Culture
- Format: Online
- Founder: Ola Christian
- Founded: 2016
- Country: United Kingdom
- Language: English
- Website: levile.co.uk

Founded in 2016, LEVILE is a platform for gifted creatives to gain genuine opportunities and access film, music, fashion and business. LEVILE have built their reputation through productions and castings. The agency is based in the UK. LEVILE have cast for BAFTA nominated directors.

== History ==
LEVILE was founded by Ola Christian in 2016, discouraged by the lack of direction afforded to his peers, a platform was developed to showcase hidden talent in the entertainment, TV and film industry.

The platform is well known for their monthly event Levile and Chill which has featured special guests such as Joivan Wade, Kayode Ewumi, Malachi Kirby and Samson Kayo. Also, the Levile Monologues actors such as Mo Mansaray has performed at the National Youth Theatre in Othello. Malcolm Kamulete cast in Top Boy on Channel 4.

In 2018, LEVILE was awarded the coveted Screen Nation DigitalisMedia Award for Favourite Entertainment & Lifestyle magazine.

== See also ==
- List of online magazines
