= Garth Jennings =

English filmmaker

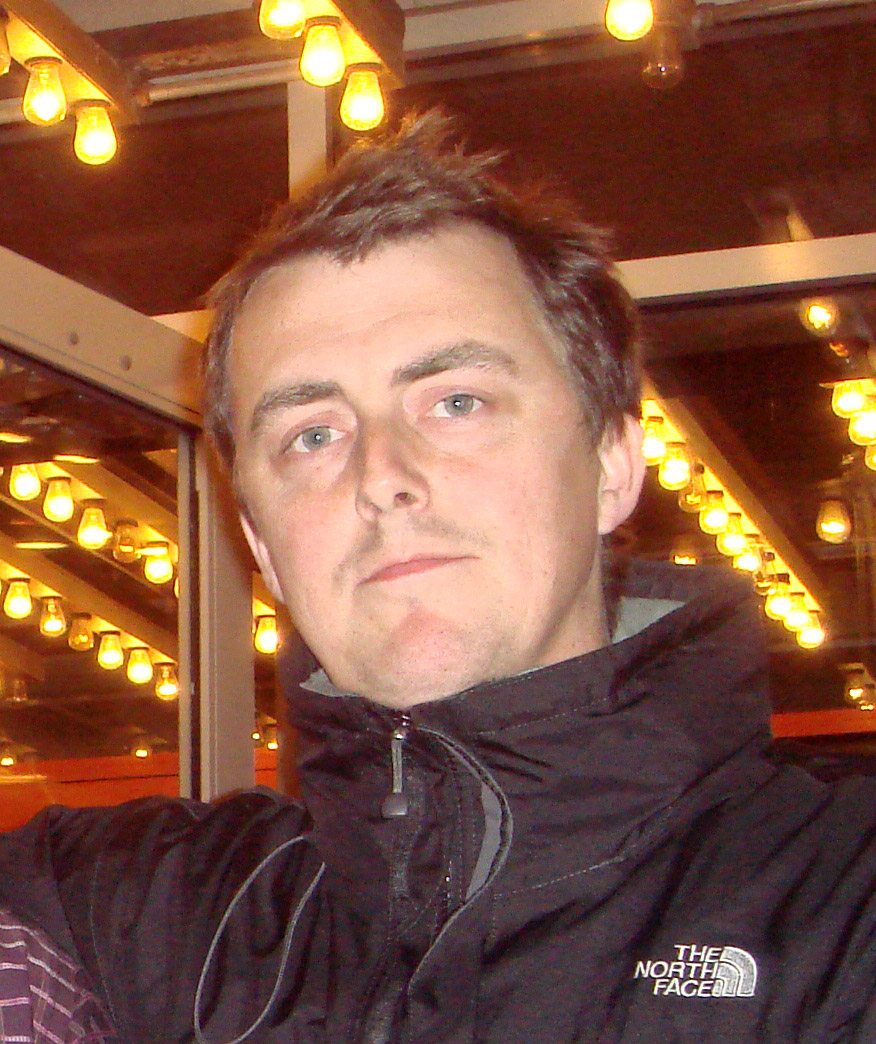
- Jennings in 2008
- Born: Epping, England
- Occupations: Director; Screenwriter; Actor
- Years active: 1990–present
- Spouse: Louise Jennings

Garth Jennings is an English director, screenwriter and actor. He has directed the feature films The Hitchhiker's Guide to the Galaxy (2005), Son of Rambow (2007), the animated film Sing (2016) and its sequel Sing 2 (2021). He co-founded the production company Hammer & Tongs with his collaborator Nick Goldsmith.

== Early life ==
Jennings was born in Essex, England.

== Career ==
=== Hammer and Tongs ===
In 1993, Garth Jennings co-founded the production company Hammer & Tongs alongside Dominic Leung and Nick Goldsmith. The production company was primarily responsible for directing and writing music videos. Their music video for Radiohead's song "Lotus Flower" earned Jennings a nomination at the 54th Annual Grammy Awards.

=== The Hitchhiker's Guide to the Galaxy ===
Garth Jennings directed a number of films including the 2005 science fiction comedy film The Hitchhiker's Guide to the Galaxy, based upon previous works in the media franchise of the same name, created by Douglas Adams. It stars Martin Freeman, Sam Rockwell, Mos Def, Zooey Deschanel and the voices of Stephen Fry, Helen Mirren and Alan Rickman.

=== Son of Rambow ===
Set over a summer during the dawn of Thatcher's Britain, Son of Rambow is a coming of age story about two schoolboys and their attempts to make an amateur film inspired by First Blood. The film premiered on 22 January 2007 at the Sundance Film Festival. It was later shown at the Newport Beach Film Festival, Seattle International Film Festival, Toronto International Film Festival and Glasgow Film Festival. The film was also shown at the 51st BFI London Film Festival. Son of Rambow was released in the United Kingdom on 4 April 2008 and opened in limited release in the United States on 2 May 2008.

=== Sing ===
In January 2014, it was announced that Garth Jennings would write and direct an animated comedy film for Universal Pictures and Illumination Entertainment. The resulting film, Sing, was released in December 2016. He also provided the voice for Miss Crawly, an elderly iguana employed as an administrative assistant to Buster Moon. A sequel, titled Sing 2, was released on 22 December 2021.

=== Madame ===
Garth Jennings directed, wrote and co-produced a short film titled Madame that was released in 2019. This film takes place inside a grand Parisian apartment where lives an elegant elderly lady. And inside this lady lives a monster.

Jennings directed the 2026 documentary & concert film Pulp: What Do You Do for an Encore?.

== Filmography ==
=== Film ===
| Year | Title | Director | Writer |
|---|---|---|---|
| 2005 | The Hitchhiker's Guide to the Galaxy | Yes | No |
| 2007 | Son of Rambow | Yes | Yes |
| 2016 | Sing | Yes | Yes |
| 2021 | Sing 2 | Yes | Yes |

Acting credits

| Year | Title | Role | Notes |
|---|---|---|---|
| 2004 | Shaun of the Dead | 'Fun Dead' Zombie | |
| 2005 | The Hitchhiker's Guide to the Galaxy | Frankie Mouse | Voice role |
| 2007 | Hot Fuzz | Crack Addict | |
| 2009 | Fantastic Mr. Fox | Bean's Son | Voice role |
| 2013 | The World's End | Man in Pub No. 5 | |
| 2016 | Sing | Miss Crawly | Voice role |
| 2019 | The Secret Life of Pets 2 | Hamster | Voice role |
| 2021 | Sing 2 | Miss Crawly | Voice role |

=== Short film ===
| Year | Title | Director | Writer | Producer |
|---|---|---|---|---|
| 2019 | Madame | Yes | Yes | Yes |
| 2024 | Sing: Thriller | Yes | Yes | No |

Acting credits

| Year | Title | Role | Notes |
|---|---|---|---|
| 2016 | Come Together: A Fashion Picture in Motion | Fritz | |
| 2017 | Love at First Sight | Miss Crawly | Voice role |
| 2024 | Sing: Thriller | Miss Crawly | Voice role |

=== Music video ===
| Year | Song | Artist |
|---|---|---|
| 1997 | "Hit" | The Wannadies |
| 1997 | "Bentley's Gonna Sort You Out" | Bentley Rhythm Ace |
| 1997 | "Help the Aged" | Pulp |
| 1998 | "A Little Soul" | Pulp |
| 1998 | "Cancer for the Cure" | Eels |
| 1998 | "Last Stop: This Town" | Eels |
| 1998 | "Saint Joe on the School Bus" | Marcy Playground |
| 1998 | "The Flipside" | Moloko |
| 1999 | "Coffee And TV" | Blur |
| 1999 | "Pumping on Your Stereo" | Supergrass |
| 1999 | "Right Here, Right Now" | Fatboy Slim |
| 1999 | "Summertime Blues" | Guitar Wolf |
| 2000 | "Theme from Gutbuster" | Bentley Rhythm Ace |
| 2000 | "Disillusion" | Badly Drawn Boy |
| 2001 | "Pissing in the Wind" | Badly Drawn Boy |
| 2001 | "Imitation of Life" | R.E.M. |
| 2002 | "Lost Cause" | Beck |
| 2005 | "Hell Yes" | Beck |
| 2005 | "Low C" | Supergrass |
| 2007 | "Nude" | Radiohead |
| 2007 | "Jigsaw Falling Into Place" | Radiohead |
| 2008 | "A-Punk" | Vampire Weekend |
| 2009 | "Cousins" | Vampire Weekend |
| 2011 | "Lotus Flower" | Radiohead |
| 2013 | "Ingenue" | Atoms For Peace |

== Awards and nominations ==
| Year | Film | Award | Category | Result |
|---|---|---|---|---|
| 2000 | Da Ali G Show | Royal Television Society UK | Best Graphic Design – Titles | Won |
| 2000 | Supergrass: Pumping on Your Stereo | MTV Video Music Awards | Best Art Direction in a video | Nominated |
| 2001 | R.E.M.: Imitation of Life | MTV Video Music Awards | Best Direction in a video | Nominated |
| 2005 | The Hitchhiker's Guide to the Galaxy | The Artios Award – Casting Society of America | Best Featured Film Casting-Comedy | Nominated |
| 2006 | The Hitchhiker's Guide to the Galaxy | Golden Trailer Award | Most Original | Won |
| 2006 | The Hitchhiker's Guide to the Galaxy | OFTA Film Awards | Best Music, Original Song | Nominated |
| 2006 | The Hitchhiker's Guide to the Galaxy | Empire Awards UK | Best British Film | Nominated |
| 2006 | The Hitchhiker's Guide to the Galaxy | Empire Awards UK | Best Comedy | Nominated |
| 2006 | The Hitchhiker's Guide to the Galaxy | Golden Trailer Awards | Best Voice Over | Nominated |
| 2008 | Son of Rambow | British Independent Film Awards | Best Director | Nominated |
| 2008 | Son of Rambow | British Independent Film Awards | Best Screenplay | Nominated |
| 2008 | Son of Rambow | British Independent Film Awards | Most Promising Newcomer for Bill Milner and Will Poulter | Nominated |
| 2008 | Son of Rambow | Locarno International Film Festival | Audience Award | Won |
| 2008 | Son of Rambow | Locarno International Film Festival | Variety Piazza Grande Award | Nominated |
| 2008 | Son of Rambow | National Board of Review USA | Top Independent Films | Won |
| 2009 | Son of Rambow | BAFTA Awards | Most Promising Newcomer | Nominated |
| 2009 | Son of Rambow | Empire Awards UK | Best Comedy | Won |
| 2009 | Son of Rambow | Empire Awards UK | Best British Film | Nominated |
| 2012 | Radiohead: Lotus Flower | Grammy Awards | Best Short Form Music Video | Nominated |
| 2017 | Sing | Golden Globe Awards | Best Animated Feature Film | Nominated |
| 2017 | Sing | Golden Globe Awards | Best Original Song "Faith" – Ryan Tedder, Stevie Wonder and Francis Farewell Starlite | Nominated |
| 2017 | Sing | Annie Awards | Music in an Animated Feature Production for Joby Talbot | Nominated |
| 2017 | Sing | Hollywood Music in Media Awards | Best Song for an Animated Film | Nominated |
| 2017 | Sing | Hollywood Music in Media Awards | Best Soundtrack Album | Nominated |
| 2017 | Sing | Hollywood Music in Media Awards | Outstanding Music Supervision for Jojo Villanueva | Won |
| 2017 | Sing | Nickelodeon Kids' Choice Awards | Favorite Animated Movie | Nominated |
| 2017 | Sing | Nickelodeon Kids' Choice Awards | Favorite Voice from an animated movie for Reese Witherspoon | Nominated |
| 2017 | Sing | Nickelodeon Kids' Choice Awards | Most wanted pet for Reese Witherspoon | Nominated |
| 2017 | Sing | Nickelodeon Kids' Choice Awards | Favorite Soundtrack | Nominated |
| 2017 | Sing | Behind the Voice Actors Awards | Best Male Vocal Performance in a feature film in a supporting role as the voice of "Miss Crawly" | Nominated |
| 2017 | Sing | British Academy Children's Awards | Feature Film | Nominated |
| 2017 | Sing | Saturn Awards | Best Animated Feature Film | Nominated |
| 2017 | Sing | AARP Annual Movies for Grownups Awards | Best Movie for grownups who refuse to grow up | Nominated |
| 2019 | Madame | Dada Saheb Phalke Film Festival | Best Short Live Action / Best Short Animation | Won |
| 2019 | Madame | Seattle International Film Festival | Best Film | Nominated |
| 2019 | Madame | HollyShorts Film Festival | Official Selections | Nominated |
| 2019 | Madame | DC Shorts Festival | Official Selections | Nominated |
| 2019 | Madame | Sitges International Fantastic Film Festival of Catalonia | Official Selections | Nominated |
| 2019 | Madame | Thriller! Chiller! | Best Chill | Won |
| 2019 | Madame | Screamfest Horror Film Festival | Official Selections | Nominated |
| 2019 | Madame | Santa Fe Independent Film Festival | Official Selections | Nominated |
| 2019 | Madame | Sapporo International Short Film Festival | Official Selections | Nominated |
| 2019 | Madame | Cambridge Film Festival | Official Selections | Nominated |
| 2019 | Madame | Vortex Sci-Fi, Fantasy and Horror Film Festival | Official Selections | Nominated |
| 2019 | Madame | Aesthetica Short Film Festival | Best Thriller | Won |
| 2019 | Madame | Foyle Film Festival | Official Selections | Nominated |
| 2019 | Madame | Druk International Film Festival | Official Selections | Nominated |
| 2019 | Madame | Shockfest Film Festival | Official Selections | Nominated |
| 2019 | Madame | Bahamas International Film Festival | Official Selections | Nominated |
| 2019 | Madame | Anchorage International Film Festival | Best Narrative Short | Won |
| 2019 | Madame | Horror Bowl Movie Awards | Best Short | Won |
| 2019 | Madame | London Short Film Festival | Official Selections | Nominated |

== Books ==
| Year | Title | Publishing house |
|---|---|---|
| 2015 | The Deadly 7 | Pan Macmillan |
| 2017 | The Wildest Cowboy (illustrated by Sara Ogilvie) | Pan Macmillan |
| 2019 | The Good, The Bad and the Deadly 7 | Pan Macmillan |
| 2021 | The Curse of the Deadly 7 | Pan Macmillan |
