= Once Around the Sun =

Once Around the Sun may refer to:

- Once Around the Sun (Joby Talbot album), 2005
- Once Around the Sun (Shane Richie album), 2000
