= This Is Hardcore =

Studio album by Pulp
- Released: 30 March 1998
- Recorded: November 1996 – January 1998
- Studios: The Townhouse, London; Olympic, London
- Genres: Art rock; glam rock; Britpop
- Length: 69:49
- Label: Island
- Producer: Chris Thomas

Pulp chronology
Countdown 1992–1983 (1996)	This Is Hardcore (1998)	Freshly Squeezed... the Early Years (1998)

Pulp studio album chronology
Different Class (1995)	This Is Hardcore (1998)	We Love Life (2001)

Singles from This Is Hardcore
- 1. "Help the Aged" Released: 10 November 1997; 2. "This Is Hardcore" Released: 11 March 1998; 3. "A Little Soul" Released: 8 June 1998; 4. "Party Hard" Released: 7 September 1998

This Is Hardcore is the sixth studio album by the English rock band Pulp, released on 30 March 1998. Following the success of Different Class (1995), friction grew in the band, culminating in the departure of the guitarist and violinist Russell Senior. Pulp singer Jarvis Cocker left for New York alone to decompress and write in isolation. These new songs took a much more art rock approach and glam rock influence.

After reconciling with the band, work on the album began in November 1996 and finished in January 1998. Lead single "Help the Aged" was released on 10 November 1997, followed by "This Is Hardcore" on 11 March 1998. After the album's release, two more singles were released: "A Little Soul" on 8 June and "Party Hard" on 7 September.

As with the band's previous album, This Is Hardcore received generally positive reviews from critics and debuted at No. 1 on the UK Albums Chart, but with far fewer sales. The album earned Pulp a third successive nomination for the 1998 Mercury Prize. A deluxe remastered edition of This Is Hardcore was released on 11 September 2006, containing a second disc of B-sides, demos and rarities.

== Artwork ==
The cover photo was art directed by Peter Saville and the American painter John Currin who is known for his figurative paintings of exaggerated female forms. The model photographed is Ksenia Zlobina and the images were further digitally manipulated by Howard Wakefield, who also designed the album. Currin was also the art director for the "Help the Aged" video, based on his painting "The Never Ending Story". Advertising posters showing the album's cover that appeared on the London Underground system were defaced by graffiti artists with slogans like "This Offends Women" and "This is Sexist" or "This is Demeaning".

The music video for the title track was directed by Doug Nichol and was listed as the No. 47 best video of all time by NME. A bonus live CD entitled "This Is Glastonbury" was added to the album later in 1998.

== Commercial performance ==
The album had first-week sales of just over 50,000, 62% fewer than Different Class first-week sales of 133,000. The album was certified gold by the BPI April 1998 for sales of 100,000. As of 2008, sales in the United States have exceeded 86,000 copies, according to Nielsen SoundScan.

== Reception and legacy ==
Professional ratings
Review scores
Source	Rating
AllMusic	4.5/5 stars
Chicago Tribune	3.5/4 stars
Entertainment Weekly	A−
The Guardian	4/5 stars
Los Angeles Times	3.5/4 stars
NME	7/10
Pitchfork	7.8/10
Q	4/5 stars
Rolling Stone	4/5 stars
Spin	8/10

Nick Hornby, writing in Spin, proclaimed that on the album "England's unofficial poet laureate Jarvis Cocker perfects his poetry of the prosaic". Rolling Stone noted that This is Hardcore was "less bright and bouncy" than its era-defining predecessor, but praised it as being "even more daring and fully realized", noting that "it plays like a movie, a series of scenes from a life", and declared that it "is arguably the first pop album devoted entirely to the subject of the long, slow fade", which it heralded as "a bold move because it breaks one of rock's oldest songwriting taboos". The review concluded, "In midlife oblivion, Pulp have found a strange kind of liberation. Desperation never sounded quite so entertaining." Reviews in the United States adopted a similar tone, with the Chicago Tribune, Los Angeles Times, and the Pittsburgh Post-Gazette all awarding three and a half stars out of four. The Tribune hailed it as "a smashing album about midlife crisis" and found that "[the] music is sumptuous lounge-lizard rock augmented by strings and noisy disruptions – a clever, catchy '90s take on the Bowie/Mott/Roxy glam rock of the '70s."

In a retrospective assessment of the album's impact, Matthew Horton wrote in NME that "in its sense of surrender, regret and flashes of panic, it captured the time to a tee." In an article entitled, "How Pulp's This Is Hardcore Brought Britpop to a Halt", Horton maintained that it was "a sloughing-off of fame’s skin, a rejection of the Britpop monster". He concluded, "It's an end, a hard-wrought epitaph to a band's jaunt in the limelight and a suitable jump-off point for what had been a rare old few years – for us, at least." Another review found the song "A Little Soul" to be "Cocker's most disconsolately beautiful", drawing "from the musical blueprint of Smokey Robinson's 'Tracks of My Tears.'"

This is Hardcore was included in the book 1001 Albums You Must Hear Before You Die. In 2013, NME ranked it at number 166 in its list of the 500 Greatest Albums of All Time. In 2014, US LGBT magazine Metro Weekly placed the album at number 46 in its list of the "50 Best Alternative Albums of the '90s". In 2017, Pitchfork ranked it seventh in "The 50 Best Britpop Albums".

== Track listing ==
All lyrics are written by Jarvis Cocker; all music is composed by Cocker, Nick Banks, Candida Doyle, Steve Mackey and Mark Webber, except where noted.

No.	Title	Music	Length
1.	"The Fear"		5:35
2.	"Dishes"		3:30
3.	"Party Hard"		4:00
4.	"Help the Aged"		4:28
5.	"This Is Hardcore" (includes a sample of "Bolero on the Moon Rocks" written by Peter Thomas, recorded by The Peter Thomas Sound Orchestra)	Cocker; Banks; Doyle; Mackey; Webber; Thomas	6:25
6.	"TV Movie"		3:25
7.	"A Little Soul"		3:19
8.	"I'm a Man"		4:59
9.	"Seductive Barry"		8:31
10.	"Sylvia"		5:44
11.	"Glory Days"	Cocker; Banks; Doyle; Mackey; Webber; Antony Genn	4:55
12.	"The Day After the Revolution" (edited to 5:52 on North American releases)		14:56
Total length:			69:49

North American releases
No.	Title	Length
13.	"Like a Friend"	4:31
Total length:		65:16

== Personnel ==
Pulp

- Jarvis Cocker
- Nick Banks
- Candida Doyle
- Steve Mackey
- Mark Webber

Production

- Chris Thomas – production
- Pete Lewis – engineering
- Lorraine Francis – assistant engineering
- Jay Reynolds – assistant engineering
- Olle Romo – programming
- Matthew Vaughan – programming
- Magnus Fiennes – programming
- Mark Haley – programming
- Anne Dudley – string arrangement (2, 5, 7, 9)
- Pulp – string arrangement (2, 5, 7, 9)
- Nicholas Dodd – orchestration (5, 9)

Additional musicians

- Anne Dudley – piano (5, 7, 11)
- Chris Thomas – piano (5)
- Neneh Cherry – featured vocals (9)
- Mandy Bell – backing vocals (1, 9)
- Carol Kenyon – backing vocals (1, 9)
- Jackie Rawe – backing vocals (1, 9)

Artwork

- John Currin – direction
- Peter Saville – direction
- Horst Diekgerdes – photography
- Howard Wakefield – design
- Paul Hetherington – design

== Charts ==
=== Weekly charts ===
Chart (1998)	Peak position
Australian Albums (ARIA)	15
Austrian Albums (Ö3 Austria)	20
Belgian Albums (Ultratop Wallonia)	44
Canada Top Albums/CDs (RPM)	32
Dutch Albums (Album Top 100)	56
Estonian Albums (Eesti Top 10)	8
European Albums Chart	6
Finnish Albums (Suomen virallinen lista)	15
French Albums (SNEP)	9
German Albums (Offizielle Top 100)	24
Icelandic Albums (Tonlist)	2
New Zealand Albums (RMNZ)	12
Norwegian Albums (VG-lista)	10
Scottish Albums (Official Charts)	4
Swedish Albums (Sverigetopplistan)	14
Swiss Albums (Schweizer Hitparade)	31
UK Albums (Official Charts)	1
US Billboard 200	114
US Heatseekers Albums (Billboard)	1

=== Year-end charts ===
Chart (1998)	Position
UK Albums (OCC)	75

== Certifications ==
Region	Certification	Certified units/sales
United Kingdom (BPI)	Gold	100,000^{^}
^{^} Shipments figures based on certification alone.
