= Joby Talbot =

British composer

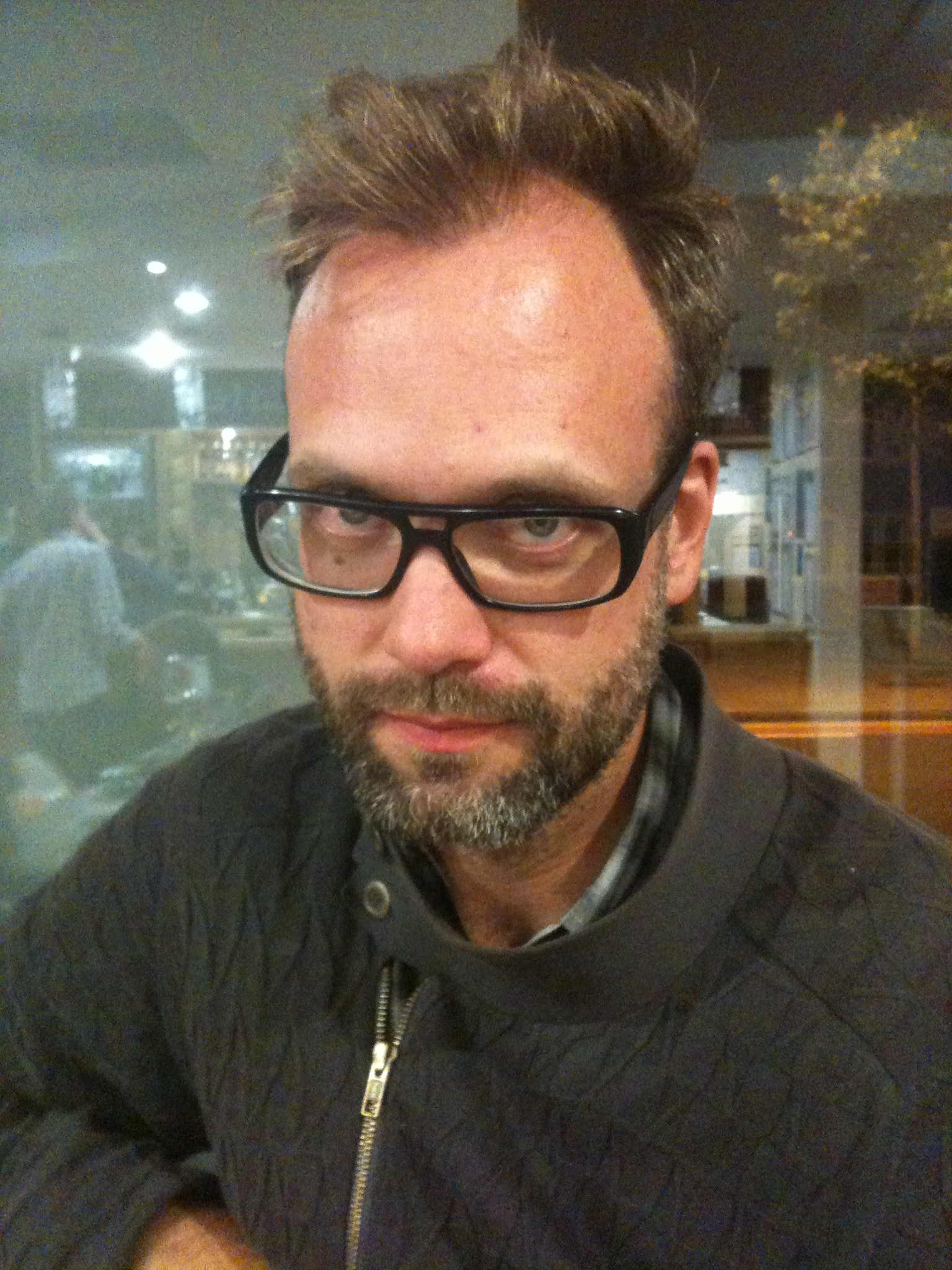
- Talbot in 2011

Background information
- Born: 25 August 1971 (age 54); Wimbledon, London, England
- Occupation: Composer

Joby Talbot (born 25 August 1971) is a British composer. He has written for a wide variety of purposes, with a broad range of styles, including instrumental and vocal concert music, film and television scores, pop arrangements and works for dance. He is known, to sometimes disparate audiences, for quite different works.

Prominent compositions include the a cappella choral works The Wishing Tree (2002) and Path of Miracles (2005); orchestral works Sneaker Wave (2004), Tide Harmonic (2009), Worlds, Stars, Systems, Infinity (2012) and Meniscus (2012); the theme and score for the popular BBC Two comedy series The League of Gentlemen (1999–2002); silent film scores The Lodger (1999) and The Dying Swan (2002) for the British Film Institute; film scores The Hitchhiker's Guide to the Galaxy (2005), Son of Rambow (2007) and Penelope (2008).

Works for dance include shorter works Chroma (2006), Genus (2007), Fool's Paradise (2007), and Chamber Symphony (2012); and four full-length narrative ballet scores, commissioned by The Royal Ballet, the National Ballet of Canada and The Australian Ballet, Alice's Adventures in Wonderland (2011, revived 2012 and 2013), The Winter's Tale (2014), Like Water for Chocolate (2022), and Oscar (2024).

Talbot premiered his first opera in January 2015 with Dallas Opera, a one-act work entitled Everest to a libretto by Gene Scheer, which follows three of the climbers involved in the 1996 Mount Everest disaster.

== Early life ==
Talbot was born in August 1971 in Wimbledon, London. He grew up in Mitcham, South London, and attended King's College School, Wimbledon, on a music scholarship from the age of eight. Talbot played the piano and oboe, studied composition privately with Brian Elias and after receiving a Bachelor of Music from Royal Holloway University of London, he completed a Master of Music (Composition) at Guildhall School of Music and Drama under Simon Bainbridge.

== Early career and concert works ==
Though classically trained, Talbot's early career centred on film and television scores and pop arrangements. His work as arranger and keyboardist with Neil Hannon's band The Divine Comedy continued from 1993 until 2002. He also played saxophone on the song "Time of Legends" for gothic rock band NOSFERATU, appearing on their 1993 single "Savage Kiss" and their 1994 album The Prophecy. In 1999, following some minor television scoring jobs, Talbot was commissioned to write the theme and score for BBC Two's comedy series The League of Gentlemen, for which he was awarded the Royal Television Society Award for Best Title Music and which he would continue to score throughout its three series and film, The League of Gentlemen's Apocalypse (2005). Talbot was commissioned, also in 1999, by the British Film Institute to provide a new score for Alfred Hitchcock's 1927 silent film The Lodger, and again in 2002 the BFI had Talbot write a piano trio to accompany Evgenii Bauer's The Dying Swan (1917).

Concert works of this period include Luminescence (1997) for the BBC Philharmonic; Falling (1998), written for cellist Phillip Sheppard; Incandescence (1998) for percussion and orchestra, commissioned by the Brunel Ensemble and later toured by Evelyn Glennie and the London Sinfonietta; String Quartet No. 1 (1999) and No. 2 (2002), for the Duke Quartet; the saxophone quartet Blue Cell (2001) for the Apollo Saxophone Quartet; and Minus 1500 (2001) for bassoon, percussion, strings and piano, commissioned by the London Sinfonietta. During this time, Talbot also completed a popular reworking of Portishead's 'All Mine' for The Divine Comedy's contribution to Tom Jones' covers album Reload (1999).

In 2002, Talbot wrote The Wishing Tree, a short a cappella madrigal setting a text by Kathleen Jamie, for The King's Singers, commissioned by the ensemble and The Proms as part of the Queen's Golden Jubilee. Subsequent to this, Talbot was asked by Nigel Short, artistic director of chamber choir Tenebrae, to create a work that described the ancient Christian pilgrimage route across northern Spain to Santiago de Compostela. The resultant piece was the hour-long, a cappella journey Path of Miracles, setting multilingual texts collated by Robert Dickinson, which has steadily gained popularity with vocal ensembles and audiences.

Sneaker Wave (2004) for the BBC National Orchestra of Wales was Talbot's second Proms commission, and also in that year, he was appointed Classic FM's inaugural Composer-in-Residence, a project which involved the composition of one short piece for small ensemble per month and resulted in the album Once Around the Sun (2005 Sony BMG). In 2006, Talbot wrote the trumpet concerto Desolation Wilderness for soloist Alison Balsom and the Royal Liverpool Philharmonic and Turku Philharmonic Orchestras. A third work for the Proms was Talbot's 2011 arrangement of Purcell's Chacony in G Minor for the BBC Symphony Orchestra. The next year, Talbot was commissioned by the Philharmonia Orchestra to write an eighth movement to Holst's The Planets, as part of their interactive installation Universe of Sound at the Science Museum, London. The work, entitled Worlds, Stars, Systems, Infinity premiered at The Royal Festival Hall, London, in 2012, as part of the 2012 London Cultural Olympiad.

== Works for dance ==
=== Collaborations with Wayne McGregor ===
Among the pieces composed as part of Talbot's Classic FM residency are A Yellow Disc Rising from the Sea, Transit of Venus and Cloudpark, all of which went on to form part of Talbot's score for the Royal Ballet production Chroma (2005), his first collaboration with current Royal Ballet Resident Choreographer Wayne McGregor C.B.E. McGregor had heard Talbot's 2004 orchestral work Hovercraft and approached him about creating a larger score around this. The remaining elements of the Chroma score are the tracks 'Aluminum', 'Blue Orchid' and 'Hardest Button to Button' from Talbot's 2005 instrumental covers album of songs by The White Stripes, entitled Aluminium, a project conceived and executed in partnership with XL Recordings founder Richard Russell, and Talbot's long-time collaborator, the conductor and orchestrator Christopher Austin. Chroma won the South Bank Show Award for Dance and an Olivier Award for Best New Dance Production, and continues to be staged by numerous companies internationally, including the Bolshoi Ballet, San Francisco Ballet, Royal Danish Ballet, National Ballet of Canada, Boston Ballet, The Australian Ballet and Alvin Ailey American Dance Theater.

Following Chroma, McGregor and Talbot collaborated on two further works, Genus (2007) for the Paris Opera Ballet, for which Talbot produced an electro-acoustic score with LA-based electronic musician Deru; and Entity (2008) for McGregor's company Random Dance, a score divided between electro-acoustic string works by Talbot, and an electronic score by Jon Hopkins. Talbot's half was adapted from his string quartet Manual Override, originally commissioned in 2007 by Singapore's T'ang Quartet; and from the 2005 cello work Motion Detector, written for cellist Maya Beiser.

=== Collaborations with Christopher Wheeldon ===
Subsequent to Chroma, Talbot became increasingly involved in projects for dance, adapting his 2002 score for Evgenii Bauer's silent film The Dying Swan to score Fool's Paradise, a short 2007 work devised by choreographer Christopher Wheeldon for his company Morphoses and later integrated into the repertoire of The Royal Ballet.

When Wheeldon was appointed to choreograph The Royal Ballet's first new, full-length narrative ballet commissioned in almost 20 years, he approached Talbot to write the score. Alice's Adventures in Wonderland, commissioned jointly by the Royal and the National Ballet of Canada, premiered at the Royal Opera House Covent Garden on 28 February 2011, and at the Four Seasons Performing Arts Centre, Toronto, on 4 June 2011. The production has had its third consecutive run with The Royal Ballet in March 2013 and has thus far been successfully toured to Los Angeles and Washington D.C. by the National Ballet of Canada. The New York Times stated in 2011: "Mr. Talbot's score is the trump card for Alice." The 2012 and 2013 productions received very good to excellent reviews. Talbot was praised for his "sublimely witty score, which seems to use every instrument to match the sounds from the pit to the action on the stage, creating a lush soundscape that drives the action." A suite from Alice's Adventures in Wonderland, along with the score from the duo's first collaboration Fool's Paradise, was recorded in London in November 2012 by the Royal Philharmonic Orchestra under Christopher Austin and released in January 2013.

In May 2013, Wheeldon choreographed sections of an orchestral version of Talbot's 2009 work Tide Harmonic for Pacific Northwest Ballet, under the same title.

In London in April 2014, the pair premiered a second full-length narrative work for The Royal Ballet and National Ballet of Canada, an adaptation of Shakespeare's The Winter's Tale. Talbot commented that he spent two years thinking about 'nothing else.' The project proved especially challenging as he was composing music to be played by unusual instruments and the contrasting nature of each act from one to three made it feel he had to 'start again' twice more. The critical reception was favourable with five stars from The Times and The Telegraph and four from the Financial Times and The Guardian, which called the work 'a ballet to keep'. The Winter's Tale was premiered in North America by the National Ballet of Canada in Toronto in November 2015 and returned to Covent Garden the following year. With some amendment it was performed again at the Royal Opera House in 2018.

In 2023 Talbot received an Ivor Novello Award nomination at The Ivors Classical Awards 2023. Like Water for Chocolate was nominated for Best Stage Work.

The ballet Oscar, based on the life of Oscar Wilde, was premiered by The Australian Ballet at the Regent Theatre, Melbourne in September 2024.

=== Eau and Chamber ===
French choreographers Carolyn Carlson and Medhi Walerski have both created works to specially commissioned scores by Talbot. Carlson's production Eau for CCN Roubaix and the Orchestre National de Lille had its premiere in Lille in 2008, and Talbot later adapted the score as Tide Harmonic, a five-movement chamber work released on Signum Classics in 2011. Walerski's Chamber was choreographed to Talbot's Chamber Symphony (2012) for Netherlands Dance Theatre and the Norwegian National Opera and Ballet, and premiered in The Hague in October 2012. The piece formed part of a worldwide programming focus on the 100th anniversary of Igor Stravinsky's The Rite of Spring (1913).

== Screen scores and arrangements ==
Talbot has continued to write for film and television, with notable scores including The Hitchhiker's Guide to the Galaxy (Garth Jennings, 2005); Penelope (Mark Palansky, 2006); Son of Rambow (Garth Jennings, 2007); Is Anybody There? (John Crowley, 2008); Franklyn (Gerald McMorrow, 2008); Burke and Hare (John Landis, 2010); and Hunky Dory (Marc Evans, 2011), for which Talbot developed orchestral arrangements of pop songs with the film's young actors and musicians, alongside writing the largely electronic score. Following his work on BBC Two comedy series The League of Gentlemen (1999–2002), Talbot wrote the theme and, with Jeremy Holland-Smith, the score for League co-creators and actors Reece Shearsmith and Steve Pemberton's new series, Psychoville (2011–12). Further work for the BBC has included the theme and (with Jeremy Holland-Smith and Richard Chester) score for the popular children's series Tracy Beaker Returns (2010–12). Talbot also wrote the theme for the BBC One drama series Frankie.

As an arranger, Talbot has worked with numerous contemporary pop musicians, including Paul McCartney, Tom Jones, Air, Charlotte Gainsbourg, Neil Hannon and The Divine Comedy, Travis, and Ute Lemper, and with record producer Nigel Godrich. Talbot himself acted as producer as well as arranger on the XL Recordings album Aluminium, a limited-edition collection of songs by The White Stripes, arranged by Talbot and Christopher Austin for chamber orchestra.

In 2016, Talbot provided the score for animated movie Sing and received an Annie Award for Outstanding Achievement, Music in an Animated Feature Production.

== Notable works ==
- "Time of Legends" (1994), hired on a session basis to play saxophone on this Nosferatu song which appeared on their album The Prophecy
- Luminescence (1997), commissioned by the BBC Philharmonic Orchestra
- The Lodger (1999), a new score for Alfred Hitchcock's 1927 silent film, commissioned by the British Film Institute
- The League of Gentlemen (1999–2002), television soundtrack
- The Dying Swan (2002), a new score for Evgenii Bauer's 1917 silent film, commissioned by the British Film Institute
- Hovercraft (2004), commissioned by the Kensington Symphony Orchestra and later incorporated into the score for Chroma
- Path of Miracles (2005), an a cappella choral work commissioned by Tenebrae
- The Hitchhiker's Guide to the Galaxy (2005), film soundtrack
- Chroma (2006), an arrangement of existing works commissioned by The Royal Ballet and choreographed by Wayne McGregor
- Desolation Wilderness (2006), a trumpet concerto commissioned by the Royal Liverpool Philharmonic and Turku Philharmonic Orchestras, soloist Alison Balsom
- Fool's Paradise (2007), an adaptation of Talbot's 2002 score for Evgenii Bauer's silent film The Dying Swan, commissioned by Sadler's Wells Theatre for Morphoses' Fool's Paradise, choreographed by Christopher Wheeldon.
- Genus (2007), an electro-acoustic score written with electronic musician Deru, commissioned by the Paris Opera Ballet and choreographed by Wayne McGregor
- Tide Harmonic (2010), originally commissioned by CCN Roubaix for the dance work Eau (2008) by Carolyn Carlson
- Chacony in G Minor (after Purcell) (2011), commissioned by the BBC Symphony Orchestra and The Proms
- Alice's Adventures in Wonderland (2011), commissioned by The Royal Ballet and National Ballet of Canada, choreographed by Christopher Wheeldon
- Worlds, Stars, Systems, Infinity (2012), commissioned by the Philharmonia Orchestra for their 2012 interactive installation Universe of Sound
- Chamber Symphony (2012), commissioned by Nederlands Dans Theater and Het Residentie Orkest, choreographed as Chamber by Medhi Walerski
- Meniscus (2012), commissioned by the National Centre for the Performing Arts, Beijing
- The Winter's Tale (2014), commissioned by The Royal Ballet and National Ballet of Canada, choreographed by Christopher Wheeldon
- Everest, one-act opera
- Sing (2016), film soundtrack
- Sing 2 (2021), film soundtrack
- Wonka (2023), film soundtrack

== Recordings ==
- The Dying Swan, Music for 1 to 7 Players (2002, Black Box Music), Talbot's score for Evgenii Bauer's 1917 silent film, along with a selection of early works
- The Hitchhiker's Guide to the Galaxy (2005, Hollywood Records Inc), film soundtrack
- Once Around the Sun (2005, Sony BMG), the collected works written during Talbot's 2004 Classic FM residency, along with other short works
- Path of Miracles (2005, Signum Classics), an a cappella work descriptive of the ancient Christian pilgrimage route across northern Spain to Santiago de Compostela, in Galicia
- Aluminium (2006, XL Recordings), Talbot's chamber arrangements of songs by The White Stripes
- Arctic Tale (2007, Bulletproof), film soundtrack
- Genus (2007, Dear Oh Dear!/Ant-Zen), Talbot and Deru's original electro-acoustic score for choreographer Wayne McGregor's work of the same name, for the Paris Opera Ballet
- Son of Rambow (2008, Bulletproof), film soundtrack
- Penelope (2008, Lakeshore Records), film soundtrack
- Franklyn (2009, Silva Screen Records), film soundtrack
- Tide Harmonic (2011, Signum Classics), originally written for choreographer Carolyn Carlson's work Eau, Tide Harmonic is a five-movement chamber work describing the different states and functions of water
- Hunky Dory (2012, Decca Records), film soundtrack
- Suite from Alice's Adventures in Wonderland (2012, Signum Classics), the score for Christopher Wheeldon's full-length narrative ballet, for The Royal Ballet and National Ballet of Canada. Includes the score from another Wheeldon collaboration, Fool's Paradise. Performed by the Royal Philharmonic Orchestra under Christopher Austin.
