= This Is Hardcore (song) =

1998 single by Pulp

Single by Pulp

from the album This Is Hardcore
- B-side: "Ladies' Man"; "The Professional"
- Released: 11 March 1998
- Genre: Alternative rock; art rock
- Length: 6:25 (album version)
- Label: Island
- Songwriters: Nick Banks; Jarvis Cocker; Candida Doyle; Steve Mackey; Mark Webber; Peter Thomas
- Producer: Chris Thomas

Pulp singles chronology
"Help the Aged" (1997)	"This Is Hardcore" (1998)	"A Little Soul" (1998)

Alternative cover
- Cover of CD2

"This Is Hardcore" is a song by English rock band Pulp, released as the second single from their sixth album, This Is Hardcore (1998). Written as a commentary on fame using pornography as an analogy, the song includes a sample of the Peter Thomas Sound Orchestra's "Bolero on the Moon Rocks." Released as a single in March 1998, the song reached number 12 in the UK and became a top-40 hit in Finland, Iceland, and New Zealand. It has since seen critical acclaim, as has its music video.

== Background ==
"This Is Hardcore" was based on Jarvis Cocker's self-described "mixture of revulsion and attraction" to pornography. In a 1998 interview, Cocker stated that he found it "fascinating" how, in pornography, people "need to see new faces all the time, so what happens to the older people when they've been used up and had everything done to them?" He then predicted that the internet would be the "next step for porn." In another interview, he explained of the song's meaning:

'This Is Hardcore' is a bit about fame, actually... I ended up watching a lot of porn - hah! - on tour. If you get back to the hotel and you've got nothing to do, you put the adult channel on and have a look... It's the way that people get used up in it. You'd see the same people in films, and they'd seem to be quite alive, and then you'd see a film from a year later and there's something gone in their eyes. You can see it, that they've done it all and there's nowhere else to go. There seemed to be something really poignant about that to me. It seemed to be very similar to the way people get used in the entertainment business.

Musically, Cocker cited easy listening music, such as Tipsy and Stock, Hausen, & Walkman, as inspirations for their "creepy, profoundly uneasy listening." The song also features a sample from "Bolero on the Moon Rocks" by the Peter Thomas Sound Orchestra, which Cocker recalled "jigsaw[ing] together" throughout the song. Cocker explained, "It started off as an experiment. ... I was really pleased with it because I'd been thinking vaguely before doing this record to get away from the verse-chorus-verse-middle bit-double chorus-end kind of structure, but still have a melody ... we kind of achieved it on that song."

== Release ==
"This Is Hardcore" was released as the second single from This Is Hardcore, first in Japan on 11 March 1998, then in the United Kingdom on 16 March. The song's selection for single release was controversial in the band. Bassist Steve Mackey stated, "I think it's got a place. To me 'This Is Hardcore' is like a challenge in song, it's a gauntlet for the rest of the year. It's like when Radiohead put out 'Paranoid Android' in 1997: here you are, deal with this." Guitarist Mark Webber, meanwhile, was less approving:

"I was never a very big fan of this song. I can appreciate that it's good work, but I never really liked it. From the outset, Jarvis didn't want people to expect an album of 'Common People' and 'Disco 2000', He wanted to redraw the boundaries - and recently it has been a case of Jarvis' will overriding everyone else's common sense."

The single charted at number 12 on the UK Singles Chart. It was also the band's only top-50 hit in New Zealand, reaching number 38 on the RIANZ chart in April.

== Reception ==
"This Is Hardcore" has generally seen positive reception from critics, despite its lack of commercial viability. Stephen Thomas Erlewine of AllMusic called the song "the centerpiece of the album" and stated, "Drum loops, lounge piano, cinematic strings, and a sharp lyric create a frightening monument to weary decadence." Sylvia Patterson of New Musical Express wrote, called it "possibly the creepiest single released by a commercial 'artiste' in recording history" and concluded, "It is awful. And brilliant. Preposterous, eh?"

NME readers ranked the song as Pulp's sixth best in a fan vote, as did Stereogum's Ryan Leas, who wrote, "[The song's parts] are alternatively some of the dirtiest and saddest sounds to ever make it into a Pulp song." The Guardian named it as one of Pulp's ten best songs, writing, "It's not about sex but power, narcissism, performance and ego, and it's as grim as they come."

In October 2011, NME placed it at number 120 on its list "150 Best Tracks of the Past 15 Years". Three years later they ranked it at number 254 on "The 500 Greatest Songs of All Time."

== Music video ==
"This Is Hardcore" was accompanied upon release by a music video directed by Doug Nichol. The video features the members of the band alongside several other actors recreating vintage Hollywood scenes, including, in the words of writer Paul Pearson, "a sprawling Busby Berkeley dance sequence with Jarvis Cocker sullenly traipsing through a minefield of frozen-smiled dancers and way too many feathers." The video has since been named as one of the greatest of all time, scoring universal acclaim, with Pitchfork Media also naming its music video the 16th best of the 1990s.

== Track listings ==
All tracks are written by Nick Banks, Jarvis Cocker, Candida Doyle, Steve Mackey, Mark Webber, and Peter Thomas except where indicated.

UK and Australian CD1
No.	Title	Writer(s)	Length
1.	"This Is Hardcore" (original version)		6:27
2.	"Ladies' Man"	Banks, Cocker, Doyle, Mackey, Webber	4:44
3.	"The Professional"	Banks, Cocker, Doyle, Mackey, Webber	5:09
4.	"This Is Hardcore" (End of the Line remix)		3:02

UK and Australian CD2
No.	Title	Length
1.	"This Is Hardcore" (original version)	6:27
2.	"This Is Hardcore" (4 Hero remix)	6:25
3.	"This Is Hardcore" (Swedish Erotica remix)	4:59
4.	"This Is Hardcore" (Stock, Hausen & Walkman's remix)	5:15

UK cassette single and European CD single
No.	Title	Writer(s)	Length
1.	"This Is Hardcore" (original version)		6:27
2.	"Ladies' Man"	Banks, Cocker, Doyle, Mackey, Webber	4:44

== Personnel ==
- Jarvis Cocker: vocals
- Candida Doyle: piano
- Chris Thomas: sample loop
- Anne Dudley: strings
- Mark Webber: guitar
- Steve Mackey: bass guitar
- Nick Banks: drums

== Charts ==
=== Weekly charts ===
Chart (1998)	Peak position
Australia (ARIA)	64
Europe (Eurochart Hot 100)	55
Finland (Suomen virallinen lista)	16
France (SNEP)	98
Iceland (Íslenski Listinn Topp 40)	4
New Zealand (Recorded Music NZ)	38
Scottish Singles Sales (Official Charts)	13
UK Singles (Official Charts)	12

=== Year-end charts ===
Chart (1998)	Position
Iceland (Íslenski Listinn Topp 40)	59
