= Aluminium (album) =

Studio album by Richard Russell and Joby Talbot
- Recorded: Between August 2005 and February 2006
- Genre: Orchestra
- Length: 34:18
- Label: XL Recordings
- Producer: Richard Russell

Aluminium is a music project based upon an orchestral reworking of the music of the band The White Stripes. Its members are Richard Russell and Joby Talbot. Jack White, of the White Stripes, has endorsed the project.

Rob Jones has also produced an exhibition of artwork based on the album.

== Artwork ==
Ten images based upon the album, as well as a series of other White Stripes and Raconteurs artwork, all by Rob Jones, were displayed at the Richard Goodall Gallery in Manchester in Autumn 2006. In the 999 LP editions of the album there are 10 inch square sections of a silk print by Rob Jones in each sleeve.

== Album ==
The album, of orchestral music, was originally conceived by Richard Russell and Joby Talbot. After working on some tracks - including "Aluminium" (the White Stripes' original from the album White Blood Cells retained the American spelling "Aluminum") and "I'm Bound to Pack it Up" - they presented the work to the White Stripes in Cincinnati.

Following White's penchant for the number "3", only 3,333 copies of the CD version have been produced, along with 999 LPs. In addition to this, the album is available on unlimited download. The album was available for pre-order on November 6, 2006 and fully released on November 13.

The music was recorded by a specially selected orchestra. Part of it has since been used in the ballet Chroma, choreographed by Wayne McGregor for The Royal Ballet.

=== Track listing ===
Track	Title	Length	From the album
1	"Aluminum"	2:11	White Blood Cells
2	"I'm Bound to Pack It Up"	4:13	De Stijl
3	"Why Can't You Be Nicer To Me?"	2:54	De Stijl
4	"Astro"	2:59	The White Stripes
5	"Never Far Away"	4:27	Cold Mountain soundtrack
6	"Little Bird"	3:11	De Stijl
7	"Let's Build a Home"	2:46	De Stijl
8	"Who's a Big Baby?"	3:25	"Blue Orchid" single
9	"The Hardest Button to Button"	3:45	Elephant
10	"Forever For Her (Is Over For Me)"	4:27	Get Behind Me Satan

== Single ==
On November 13, 2006, XL Recordings released a 12" vinyl only single from the Aluminium album, limited to 500 copies. Side A was the track "Aluminum", while B contained a remix by Four Tet of "Forever For Her (Is Over For Me)". The catalogue number for the single was XLT 246. Rob Jones designed the sleeve art, similar in appearance to the Aluminium album cover.
