= Come Together: A Fashion Picture in Motion =

2016 short film directed by Wes Anderson

- Directed by: Wes Anderson
- Written by: Wes Anderson
- Produced by: Julie Sawyer
- Starring: Adrien Brody; Garth Jennings; Leo Hatton; Yasmin Kaur Barn
- Cinematography: Bruno Delbonnel
- Production companies: H&M; Riff Raff Films; The Directors Bureau
- Distributed by: H&M
- Release date: November 27, 2016 (internet)
- Running time: 4 minutes
- Language: English

Come Together: A Fashion Picture in Motion, or simply Come Together, is a 2016 Christmas-themed comedy short film written and directed by Wes Anderson, and was made as a commercial for H&M's "Come Together" clothing line. It stars Adrien Brody and Garth Jennings. On November 27, 2016, it was released on the internet.

== Plot ==
The film opens on Christmas morning on a train named the "Winter Express" of the fictional H&M Lines, where the conductor, Ralph (Adrien Brody), tells his passengers via intercom due to weather conditions, mechanical difficulties, and alternating of the tracks, the train will be delayed eleven and a half hours, making their estimated arrival time 3:17 AM. Ralph also states that it may interfere with the passengers' holiday plans, as it will his, and is sorry for the inconvenience. Although, Ralph announces that he and his assistant porter, Fritz (Garth Jennings), will be serving a Christmas brunch in the next twenty minutes, and invites the passengers to join them. During this time, the camera pans over toward some of the train passenger windows, showing not only the passengers themselves, but also presents with pictures of their loved ones on them. The camera then pans back down to Ralph, and he contacts a nearby train station master named Fred regarding supplies for the Christmas brunch. After this, Ralph and Fritz go to a window in a cabin across from Ralph's office to get the supplies he asked for with a metal hook. Ralph and Fritz then head towards the cafeteria section of the train to prepare the brunch. Nineteen minutes later, the coach passengers go to the cafeteria section for the brunch, the last one being an unaccompanied boy passenger. When he enters Ralph, Fritz, and the coach passengers welcome him, and he helps Ralph put the star on the Christmas tree.

== Cast ==
- Adrien Brody as Ralph, the conductor
- Garth Jennings as Fritz, the assistant porter
- Yasmin Kaur Barn as Passenger
- Leo Hatton as Passenger

== Reception ==
Come Together: A Fashion Picture in Motion received positive reviews from critics.

Peter Bradshaw of The Guardian gave it a 3/5 star rating, and said, "It’s a sweet little film, but the final sentimental note is a bit straightforward, and it is not obviously more rewarding or complex than any of the John Lewis-style Christmas ads..." Christopher Horton of The Independent stated, "An incredibly festive four minutes it is classic Wes, all perfect symmetry, camera pans, smooth tracking shots, immaculate costume and quaint appliances and stationery." Daniel Kreps of Rolling Stone called it "uplifting" and said, "Brody’s conductor transforms the dining car into a worthwhile celebration that captures the spirit of Christmas, with some perfectly scored assistance from John & Yoko/The Plastic Ono Band with the Harlem Community Choir’s classic 'Happy Xmas (War Is Over)'." Bryan Bishop of The Verge said, "...in just under four minutes Anderson and Brody are able to push all the right buttons. ...there’s various pieces of H&M branding tucked inside the short at discrete moments, but let’s forget about the cynicism for now, and just focus on a sweet story told with style."

Tim Nudd of Adweek said, "The film is shot in typical Anderson style, including tracking shots and great attention to detail. The final scene is quite emotional, which is nice, too, amid the exquisite design." Joey Paur of GeekTyrant said, "His [Anderson's] signature filmmaking and storytelling style is all over this thing and I love it." Campaign gave it 8/10 stars, and stated, "The spot oozes Anderson’s signature cinematic style as it tells a story of compassion and coming-together for the festive season." Alexandra Jardine of AdAge says, "The set, with its pastel colors and gorgeously stylized look, is vintage Anderson, as is Brody's poker-faced performance. This is Christmas advertising for the indie movie-lover..." Joe Berkowitz of Fast Company said, "Anderson’s gifts for composition and seeing the world through children’s eyes translates to even his advertising work. We have been here before, but we like it here." Tracy Brown of the Los Angeles Times states, "The short... definitely bears Anderson's quirky hallmarks, with the train and Brody conjuring a "Darjeeling Limited" feel. You almost forget that it's an H&M ad until you realize the passengers' wardrobe doesn't quite match the rest of the Anderson aesthetic." Paul Hiebert of YouGov stated, "The commercial is stylish and cool, quirky and fun. No doubts there."
