= Hammer & Tongs =

British director and producer duo

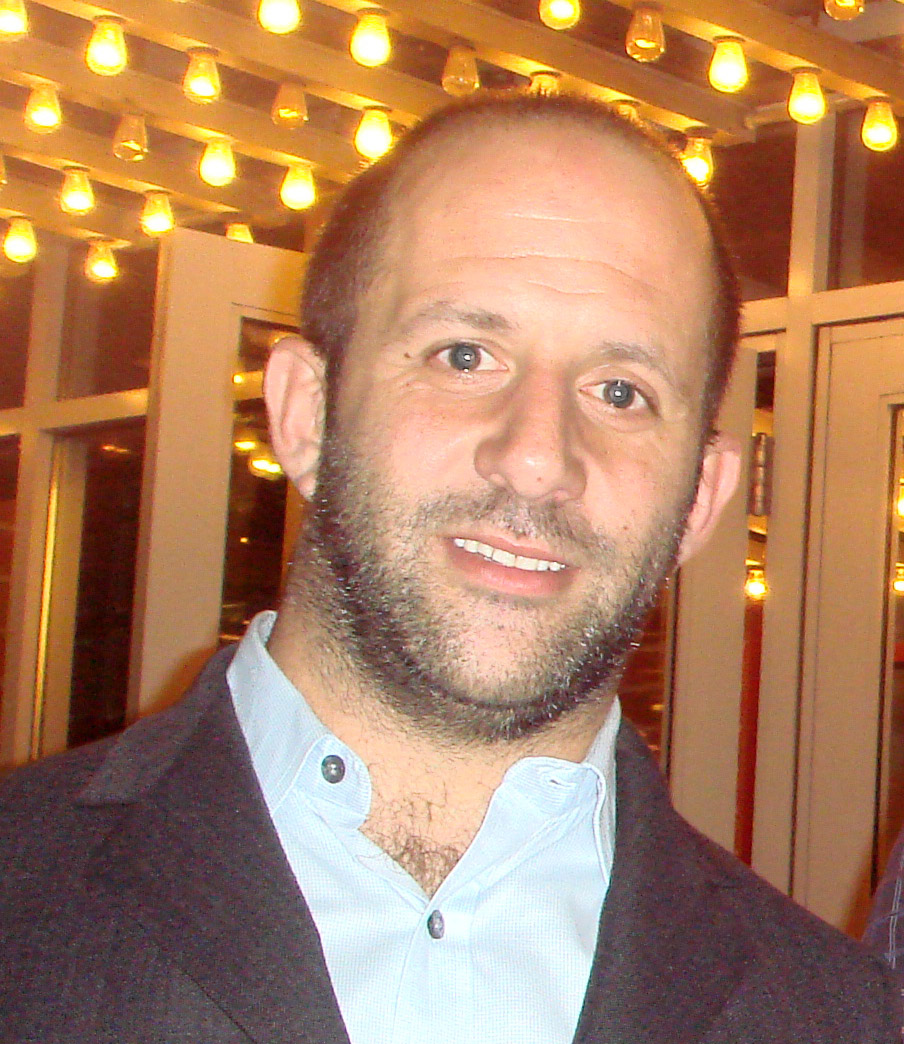
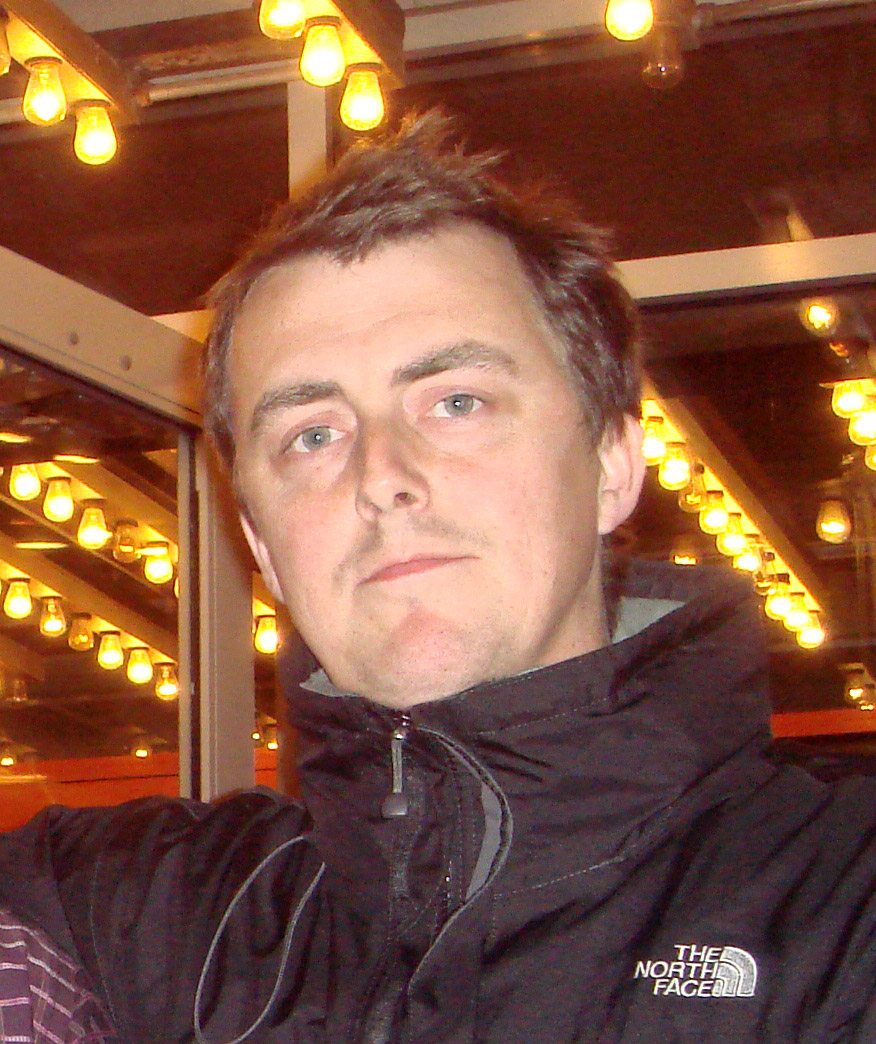
- Hammer & Tongs are Nick Goldsmith (left) and Garth Jennings (right)
- Occupations: Directors, producers, screenwriters
- Years active: 1990–2012
- Notable work: The Hitchhiker's Guide to the Galaxy

Hammer & Tongs is the pseudonym of British director and producer duo, commercial and film director Garth Jennings and producer Nick Goldsmith, as well as the name of their production company. Best known for their work on music videos for Blur ("Coffee & TV") and Supergrass ("Pumping on Your Stereo"), Hammer & Tongs have moved on to directing movies, their debut being the 2005 film version of The Hitchhiker's Guide to the Galaxy. Thanks to the success of his debut feature, Jennings raised £3.5 million to produce Son of Rambow.

After making two feature films and many music videos and adverts, the duo announced in July 2012 that they would be taking an extended break from working together in order to pursue different ventures on their own. In 2016, Jennings wrote and directed the animated musical comedy film Sing.

== Music videography ==
- Donna Giles – "And I'm Telling You I'm Not Going" (1994)
- The Mutton Birds – "Dominion Road" (1995)
- 4hero – "Mr. Kirk" (1995)
- Skunk Anansie – "Weak" (1996) – dir. Nick Goldsmith
- Menswear – "Being Brave" (1996)
- Goya Dress – "Crush" (1996)
- Sleeper – "Nice Guy Eddie" (1996)
- Del Amitri – "Medicine" (1997)
- Bentley Rhythm Ace – "Bentley's Gonna Sort You Out!" (1997)
- Ash – "A Life Less Ordinary" (1997)
- Pulp – "Help the Aged" (1997)
- Silver Sun – "Lava" (1997)
- Pressure Drop – "Silently Bad Minded" (1998)
- Pulp – "A Little Soul" (1998)
- Marcy Playground – "Saint Joe on the School Bus" (1998)
- Moloko – "The Flipside" (1998)
- Eels – "Last Stop: This Town" (1998)
- Mansun – "Six" (1999) – dir. Grant Gee
- Eels – "Cancer for the Cure" (1999)
- Lamb – "B Line" (1999)
- Fatboy Slim – "Right Here, Right Now" (1999)
- Blur – "Coffee & TV" (1999)
- Travis – "Driftwood" (1999)
- Supergrass – "Pumping on Your Stereo" (1999)
- Moloko – "The Time Is Now" (2000) – dir. Dominic Leung
- Coldplay – "Shiver" (2000) – dir. Grant Gee
- Bentley Rhythm Ace – "Theme from Gutbuster" (2000)
- The Wannadies – "Big Fan" (2000)
- Badly Drawn Boy – "Disillusion" (2000)
- Shawn Lee – "Happiness" (2000) – dir. Dominic Leung
- Fatboy Slim – "Demons" (2000)
- R.E.M. – "Imitation of Life" (2001)
- Badly Drawn Boy – "Spitting in the Wind" (2001)
- Zero 7 – "I Have Seen" (2001)
- Capitol K – "Pillow" (2002) – dir. Dominic Leung
- Badly Drawn Boy – "Silent Sigh" (2002)
- Badly Drawn Boy – "Something to Talk About" (2002)
- Beck – "Lost Cause" (2003)
- Supergrass – "Low C" (2005)
- Beck – "Hell Yes" (2005)
- Hot Chip – "Boy from School" (2006)
- Vampire Weekend – "A-Punk" (2008)
- Vampire Weekend – "Cousins" (2009)
