= Nick Goldsmith =

British film producer (born 1970)

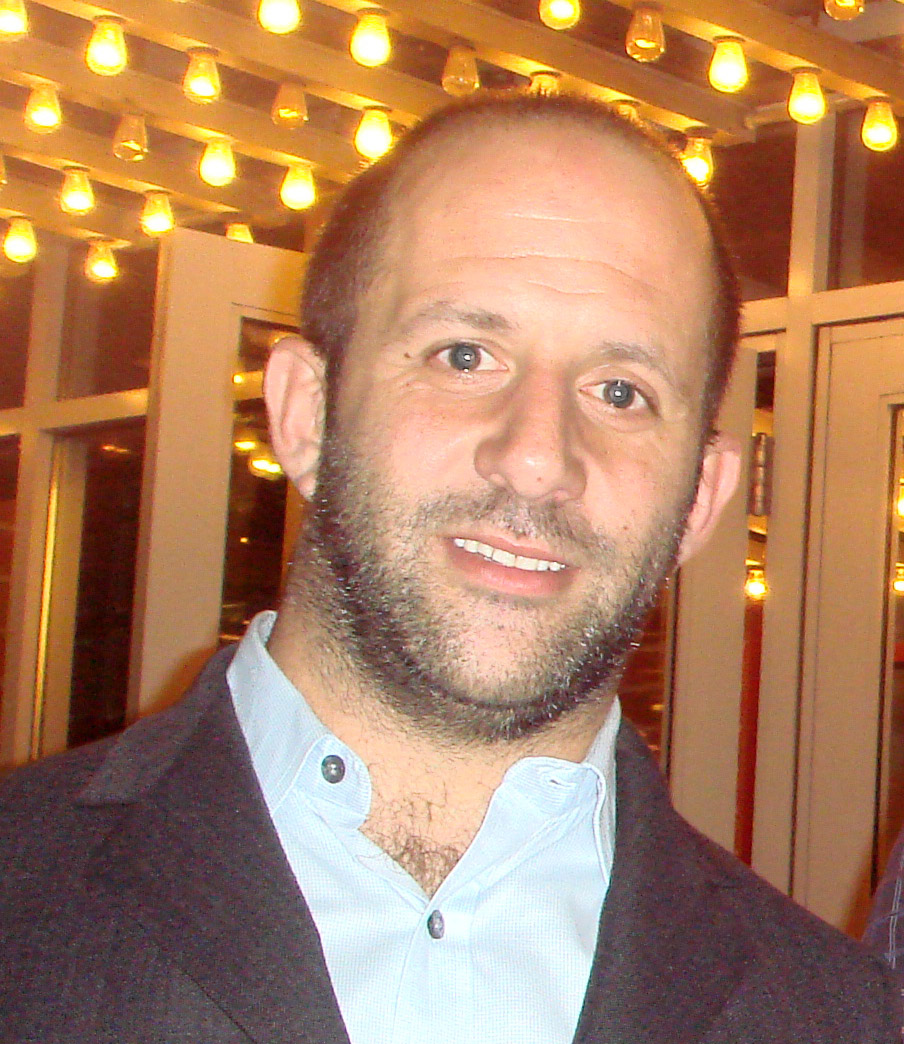
- Born: Nicholas Oliver Goldsmith; December 1970 (age 55)
- Occupations: Film producer, television producer, music video producer
- Known for: Hammer & Tongs

Nicholas Oliver Goldsmith (born December 1970) is a British film, TV and music video producer.

Goldsmith is one half of Hammer & Tongs, a production company. The other half, Garth Jennings, is normally credited as writer and director for their work.

== Early life ==
Goldsmith was educated at The Haberdashers' Aske's Boys' School, an independent school in Elstree in Hertfordshire.

== Career ==
Goldsmith has produced for many music acts, including Fat Boy Slim, and later became a film producer. He produced the 2005 film The Hitchhiker's Guide to the Galaxy and the 2007 film Son of Rambow.
