= Oscar (ballet) =

2024 ballet in two acts choreographed by Christopher Wheeldon

- Choreographer: Christopher Wheeldon
- Music: Joby Talbot
- Premiere: 13 September 2024; Regent Theatre, Melbourne
- Original ballet company: The Australian Ballet
- Characters: Oscar Wilde
- Design: Jean-Marc Puissant

Oscar is a ballet in two acts choreographed by Christopher Wheeldon to a score by Joby Talbot with stage and costume design by Jean-Marc Puissant. The ballet is based on the life of Oscar Wilde focussing on his time in Reading Gaol, but incorporating scenes from throughout his life. It weaves two of Wilde's stories into the ballet - The Nightingale and the rose and the Portrait of Dorian Gray. It was commissioned by the Australian Ballet and premiered in Melbourne in September 2024.

Oscar is the first full-length ballet commissioned by the Australian Ballet's artistic director David Hallberg, and the first full-length narrative ballet commissioned by the Australian Ballet in 20 years.

== Synopsis ==
=== Prologue ===
Oscar Wilde is prosecuted under Britain's Criminal Law Amendment Act 1885 that criminalised all sex acts between men. Details of his life are under intense scrutiny in the courtroom.

=== Act 1 ===
Wilde sits in his jail cell where he recalls better times on a family picnic with his wife Constance and their two boys. He reads them his fairy tale, The Nightingale and the Rose. We see the story unfold interspersed with scenes from Wilde's life in London's social circles and the beginnings of his relationship with Robbie Ross.

=== Act 2 ===
Subjected to hard labour in prison, Wilde is malnourished and broken. He has tinnitus in one ear due to a fall. Alone and in despair Wilde recalls scenes from his story The Picture of Dorian Gray as well as his relationship with Bosie (Lord Alfred Douglas). Dorian makes a deal with the devil to keep his beauty intact while his portrait is gradually transforming to become more and more grotesque. Wilde and Douglas's relationship deepens leading Lord Queensberry (Douglas's father) to denounce Wilde and his eventual conviction. We see parallels with Dorian, whose life collapses to restore his portrait to its former beauty.

=== Epilogue ===
On his release, Wilde is collected from prison by his friend Robbie Ross. Broken and with reputation destroyed he dies a few years later aged 46. His writing lives on and continues to be read and enjoyed today.

== Critical reception ==
The ballet was well received on its premiere. Jane Howard writing for the Guardian said that the pas de deux between Oscar Wilde and Lord Alfred Douglas "deserves to take its place in the pantheon of great romantic balletic pairings". Writing in The Age, Andrew Fuhrmann gave the ballet 5 stars and called it "a daring but fantastically rewarding experiment in ballet storytelling".

Upon Oscar's New York premiere in October 2026, reviewers in that city were more critical. Writing for The New Yorker, Hannah Aizenman said "[a]s a whole, the ballet’s arc can feel unfocussed, arhythmic—some parts overstuffed with action, others failing to fill with expressive movement," and remarked that a ballet may not be the best medium to tell Wilde's story because his "prodigious gift was his use of language, but dance is traditionally a nonverbal art". Writing for The New York Times, Brian Seibert criticized Oscar for being "timid" towards the Wilde's homosexuality, describing "the love scenes" as "devoid of erotic tension and romance". Seibert also criticized the uninspired set designs and the "derivative mediocrity" of the score.
