= The Hitchhiker's Guide to the Galaxy (film) =

2005 film by Garth Jennings

- Theatrical release poster
- Directed by: Garth Jennings
- Screenplay by: Douglas Adams; Karey Kirkpatrick
- Based on: The Hitchhiker's Guide to the Galaxy by Douglas Adams
- Produced by: Gary Barber; Roger Birnbaum; Jonathan Glickman; Nick Goldsmith; Jay Roach
- Starring: Sam Rockwell; Mos Def; Zooey Deschanel; Martin Freeman; Bill Nighy; Anna Chancellor; John Malkovich
- Cinematography: Igor Jadue-Lillo
- Edited by: Niven Howie
- Music by: Joby Talbot
- Production companies: Touchstone Pictures; Spyglass Entertainment; Hammer & Tongs Productions; Everyman Pictures
- Distributed by: Buena Vista Pictures Distribution
- Release dates: 28 April 2005 (United Kingdom); 29 April 2005 (United States)
- Running time: 109 minutes
- Countries: United Kingdom; United States
- Language: English
- Budget: $45–50 million
- Box office: $104.5 million

The Hitchhiker's Guide to the Galaxy is a 2005 science fiction comedy film directed by Garth Jennings, based upon the Hitchhiker's Guide to the Galaxy series created by Douglas Adams. It stars Martin Freeman, Sam Rockwell, Yasiin Bey (credited as Mos Def), Zooey Deschanel, Bill Nighy, Anna Chancellor, and John Malkovich, and the voices of Stephen Fry, Helen Mirren, Richard Griffiths, Thomas Lennon, Ian McNeice, and Alan Rickman. Adams co-wrote the screenplay with Karey Kirkpatrick, and the film is dedicated to Adams, who died in 2001 before production began. The film received mainly positive reviews and grossed over $100 million worldwide.

== Plot ==
One Thursday morning, Arthur Dent discovers that his house is to be immediately demolished to make way for a bypass. He tries delaying the bulldozers by lying down in front of them; however, Arthur's friend Ford Prefect convinces him to go to the nearby pub. While there, Ford explains that he is an alien from the vicinity of Betelgeuse, and a journalist working on the Hitchhiker's Guide to the Galaxy, a universal guide book. Ford warns that the Earth is to be demolished later that day by the extraterrestrial Vogons to make way for a hyperspace bypass.

As the Vogon fleet arrives, Ford rescues Arthur by stowing them aboard one of the alien ships. The Earth is then destroyed. Arthur and Ford are promptly discovered and tortured with Vogon poetry before being ejected from the vessel and left for dead. However, they are picked up by the starship Heart of Gold, aboard which they meet Ford's "semi-cousin" Zaphod Beeblebrox, the newly elected President of the Galaxy. He has stolen the ship along with Tricia "Trillian" McMillan, an Earth woman whom Arthur had met previously, and Marvin, a clinically depressed android.

Zaphod seeks the Ultimate Question of Life, the Universe, and Everything to match the disappointing answer once given by the ancient supercomputer Deep Thought: "42". He believes the answer lies on the planet Magrathea, which is only accessible through trial and error using the Heart of Gold's improbability drives.

During one attempt, the ship arrives at Viltvodle VI, where Zaphod's opponent, Humma Kavula, resides. Kavula offers the coordinates for Magrathea in exchange for Zaphod recovering the Point-of-View gun, a weapon created by Deep Thought that enables the target to temporarily empathize with the shooter. Believing she is responsible for Zaphod's kidnapping, the Vogons abduct Trillian. Arthur spearheads a rescue mission with the others, journeying to the Vogon homeworld, Vogsphere. Before her rescue, Trillian learns that Zaphod personally signed the order for Earth's destruction, mistakenly assuming he was giving a fan his autograph.

The group escapes Vogsphere with Galactic Vice-president Questular Rontok and the Vogons in pursuit. The Heart of Gold arrives in Magrathea's orbit, triggering the planet's missile defense systems. Before they can strike, Arthur re-activates the improbability drive, which transforms the missiles into a bowl of petunias and a whale, allowing the Heart of Gold to land safely. Zaphod, Ford, and Trillian enter a portal leading to Deep Thought; however, Arthur and Marvin are stranded outside. Zaphod's party learns from Deep Thought that, after coming up with the Answer "42", Deep Thought's creators had it design another computer to come up with the Question: Earth. The group recovers the Point-of-View gun, and Trillian uses it on Zaphod to show him her resentment for his accidental destruction of the Earth. They are then captured by unknown entities.

Meanwhile, on Magrathea, Arthur is met by Slartibartfast, a planet builder. Slartibartfast takes Arthur to a pocket dimension, where he shows that a new version of Earth is near completion. Slartibartfast takes Arthur to his recreated home. Inside, the others are enjoying a feast provided by the mice: hyper-intelligent, pan-dimensional beings who created Deep Thought and commissioned the original Earth. With Arthur, who was on Earth up until its last minutes, the mice surmise that they can discover the Question by removing his brain. Arthur manages to escape and crush the mice under a teapot.

Questular and the Vogons arrive outside the home and open fire; during the barrage, Marvin is shot. While Arthur and his companions take cover, Marvin reboots and uses the Point-of-View gun to force the Vogons into a crippling state of depression. The Vogons are taken away, and Zaphod reunites with Questular. Arthur decides to explore the galaxy with Ford and Trillian, allowing Slartibartfast to finalize the new Earth without him. The Heart of Gold crew decides to visit the Restaurant at the End of the Universe.

== Cast ==
- Martin Freeman as Arthur Dent, the last surviving Earth man
- Yasiin Bey (credited as Mos Def) as Ford Prefect
- Sam Rockwell as Zaphod Beeblebrox, the President of the Galaxy, Ford's "semi-cousin"
- Zooey Deschanel as Trillian, an Earth woman
- Bill Nighy as Slartibartfast, a planet builder
- Anna Chancellor as Questular, the vice-president of the Galaxy
- John Malkovich as Humma Kavula, Zaphod's opponent from the planet Vildvodle
- Warwick Davis as Marvin, an android who is clinically depressed
  - Alan Rickman as the voice of Marvin
- Helen Mirren as the voice of Deep Thought, a super-computer
- Stephen Fry as The Narrator

In addition, Bill Bailey voices the whale, Ian McNeice voices Kwaltz, Richard Griffiths voices Jeltz and Thomas Lennon voices Eddie the computer. Simon Jones, who portrayed Arthur Dent in both the BBC radio and BBC television adaptations of Hitchhiker's, makes a cameo appearance as the Ghostly Image. Mark Gatiss, Reece Shearsmith, and Steve Pemberton voice the additional Vogons, with Pemberton also appearing as Mr. Prosser. Kelly MacDonald makes a cameo as a reporter. Edgar Wright, Garth Jennings, and Jason Schwartzman appear uncredited as a Deep Thought technician, the voice of Frankie Mouse, and Gag Halfrunt, respectively.

== Production ==
=== Development ===
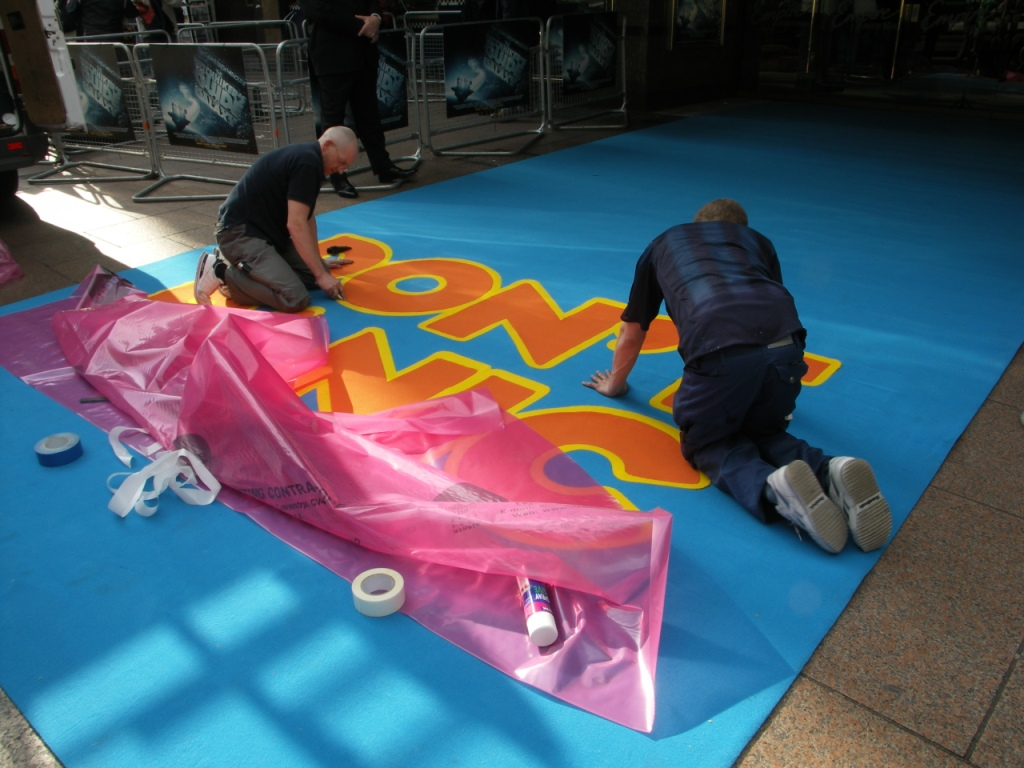
Preparations for the premiere of The Hitchhiker's Guide to the Galaxy on Leicester Square

Bringing The Hitchhiker's Guide to a theatrical version started as early as the 1970s. Douglas Adams had been approached by one unnamed producer and separately by the ABC network during the 1970s to turn the book into a film, but Adams refused both offers, as he feared they wanted to turn the work into "Star Wars with jokes". In 1982, Adams signed an option for the film with producers Ivan Reitman, Joe Medjuck and Michael C. Gross, and completed three scripts for them. As part of the rewrites, Medjuck and Gross offered the idea of bringing in either Bill Murray or Dan Aykroyd to play Ford Prefect. However, Aykroyd separately proposed a different story to Reitman, which led to this project becoming the basis for Ghostbusters. This left Adams flustered about the film's development in making sure there was the necessary commitment to the project. However, the event did generate the idea of making Prefect an American as to better draw in that audience. The project was sold in 1997 to Caravan Pictures, which eventually became Spyglass Entertainment. Disney had planned to release it under its Hollywood Pictures label, but soon transferred it to the Walt Disney Pictures label, and finally to its Touchstone Pictures label.

Movement on the film was quiet until around 2001, when director Jay Roach, using the clout he had gained from Austin Powers: International Man of Mystery and Meet the Parents, secured a new deal with Adams and production through Disney. Adams wrote a new script, and Roach sought talent like Spike Jonze to direct, Hugh Laurie to play Arthur, and Jim Carrey as Zaphod, but then Adams died on 11 May 2001. Neither Roach nor the film's executive producer Robbie Stamp wanted to see their work go for naught after Adams' death. Roach brought in Karey Kirkpatrick to complete the screenplay based on Adams' final draft, submitted just before his death. Kirkpatrick used what notes Adams had left, finding that Adams was willing to go off the book's narrative to adapt to the film. He considered his screenplay something in the spirit that Adams had set out based on the whole of Adams' work.

Some time after Adams' death, Roach decided to drop out of the project, and, on recommendation from Jonze – one of several directors asked to do the film – Roach turned to director Garth Jennings and producer Nick Goldsmith, collectively known as Hammer & Tongs, to take up the work.

=== Casting ===
When casting the characters, the studio tried to include American actors to attract an American audience. In doing so, they also made a conscious effort to limit the influence of American culture on the movie to keep the interest of the original British audience.

In an interview with Slashdot, Stamp stated the following about the cast:

- The hardest character to cast was "the voice of the Guide itself and in the end came back to somebody who was one of the people Douglas himself had wanted, namely Stephen Fry."
- "Douglas himself is on record as saying that as far as he was concerned the only character who had to be British, indeed English, was Arthur Dent."

Stamp also commented on how large a role the studio and screenwriters other than Adams played in making the film:

- "I think that a lot of fans would be surprised to know just how much of a free hand we have been given in the making of this movie. I know how easy it is to see every decision to cut a scene as 'studio' pressure but it was always much more to do with pacing and rhythm in the film itself."
- "The script we shot was very much based on the last draft that Douglas wrote... All the substantive new ideas in the movie... are brand new Douglas ideas written especially for the movie by him... Douglas was always up for reinventing HHGG in each of its different incarnations and he knew that working harder on some character development and some of the key relationships was an integral part of turning HHGG into a movie."

=== Filming ===
Principal photography began on April 19, 2004 in Tenerife. Shooting was completed on August 20, 2004, and the film was released on 28 April 2005 in Europe, Australia and New Zealand, and on the following day in Canada and the United States. The pre-title sequence was shot in Loro Parque, Puerto de la Cruz, Tenerife.

== Reception ==
=== Pre-release reception ===
After the movie was announced, many of the book's fans worried that it would not be as high of quality as the book. This was due in part to the death of the author a few years prior to the movie's release.

=== Critical reaction ===
Rotten Tomatoes, a review aggregator, reports that 61% of 195 surveyed critics gave the film a positive review; the average rating is 6.09/10. The site's consensus reads: "A frantic and occasional funny adaptation of Douglas Adams' novel. However, it may have those unfamiliar with the source material scratching their heads." Metacritic gives it 63/100, indicating "generally favourable" reviews. Audiences polled by CinemaScore gave the film an average grade "B−" on an A+ to F scale. Empire rated the film four stars out of five and said it was a "very British, very funny sci-fi misadventure that's guaranteed to win converts".

Roger Ebert gave the film two stars out of four, remarking that viewers would either enjoy its "whimsical and quirky" sense of humor; or:

You will find the movie tiresomely twee, and notice that it obviously thinks it is being funny at times when you do not have the slightest clue why that should be. You will hear dialogue that preserves the content of written humor at the cost of sounding as if the characters are holding a Douglas Adams reading ... I do not get the joke. I do not much want to get the joke, but maybe you will ... To me, it got old fairly quickly. The movie was more of a revue than a narrative, more about moments than an organizing purpose.

Manohla Dargis called it "hugely likable" with a story arc structured "more or less" as "a long beginning and then an ending"; she calls Jim Henson's Creature Shop's Vogons "beautifully constructed" and noted that Sam Rockwell's performance is "sensational, ... riffing on Elvis and the current President George Bush". Peter Bradshaw gave the film three stars out of five, and said: "The film is no disgrace, and honours the Guide's gentle, low-tech BBC origins. But it doesn't do justice to the open-ended inventiveness of the original. The inevitable Anglo-American accommodations of casting have muddled its identity and the performances of the new American stars can be uneasy. It somehow seems heavier-footed and slower-moving than Adams's concept; the gravity is stronger... The savour and flavour of the Adams original, its playfully ruminative feel, has been downgraded in favour of a jolly but less interesting outerspace romp."

Philip French, after describing the Vogons as "a species resembling Laughton's version of Quasimodo" and writing it is "not, except in its financing, anything resembling a standard Hollywood production", and called the film "slightly old-fashioned (few things date as rapidly as science fiction and our view of the future) and somewhat commonplace through its embracing familiar special effects. The jokes have to compete with the hardware and the actors executing them often exude a feeling of desperation... It's funnier, and obviously cleverer, than Spaceballs, Mel Brooks's puerile spoof on Star Wars, but a good bit less engaging than Galaxy Quest."

Within the magazine, Televisual, John Erskine expresses concern that people who were new to Hitchhiker's Guide to the Galaxy would not enjoy the movie.

=== Public reception ===
After the movie's release, a new group of readers flocked to the book. This caused several versions of the book to once again come into the public eye.

=== Box office ===
The film was released on 28 April 2005 in the United Kingdom making £4,200,000 (equivalent to £7,427,380 in 2025) in its first week. It was released a day later in North America, making US$21,103,203 (equivalent to $34,788,463 in 2025) in its opening weekend, opening in first place. In the United States, the movie remained in the box office top ten for its first four weeks of release. The total box office gross was $104,478,416 worldwide. According to Freeman, Jennings told him the film did not perform well enough for a sequel to be made.

=== Awards ===
The film was nominated for seven different awards and won one. It won the Golden Trailer Award under the category Most Original. It was nominated for: the Artios award from Casting Society of America, United States under the category Best Featured Film Casting-Comedy in 2005; the Empire Awards from Empire Awards, UK under the categories Best British Film and Best Comedy in 2006; the Golden Trailer from Golden Trailer Awards under the category Best Voice Over; and Teen Choice Award for Choice Movie: Action and Choice Rap Artist in a Movie: Mos Def).

== Soundtrack ==
The Hitchhiker's Guide to the Galaxy

Soundtrack album by Stephen Fry, Joby Talbot
- Genre: Soundtrack
- Label: Hollywood

The complete motion picture soundtrack was released as an iTunes Music Store exclusive (in the United States and the United Kingdom) on 12 April 2005, two weeks before the scheduled CD release. The iTunes Music Store also has two further exclusive sets of tracks related to the movie:

- The Marvin Mixes are remixes of a new version of "Reasons to be Miserable", here performed by Stephen Fry, as well as a new vocal and a new instrumental track for "Marvin", also performed by Fry. Stephen Moore had recorded the vocals of both tracks in 1981.
- The Guide Entries are new spoken "Hitchhiker's Guide" entries, all read by Fry, with accompanying music by Joby Talbot (with further orchestrations by Christopher Austin), who wrote the film score.

The track "Humma's Hymn" on the soundtrack was sung in St Michael's Church in Highgate, London by members of local church choirs along with a congregation consisting of members of the public. The recording was open to anyone wishing to attend, and was publicised on the internet, including in a post to the Usenet group alt.fan.douglas-adams.

The first version of the song "So Long, and Thanks for All the Fish" is a Broadway-style, lively version sung by the dolphins before they leave Earth. The second plays over the end credits and is in the style of smooth jazz. The song was written by English composer Joby Talbot, conductor Christopher Austin, and director Garth Jennings and performed by the Tenebrae Choir. Neil Hannon, founder and frontman of the Irish pop group The Divine Comedy, of which Talbot is a former member, lent his vocals to the version of the song played during the ending credits. The song, in its "bouncy", opening version, was translated into and performed in Spanish for the Latin-American Region 4 DVD release.

A reworked version of the theme from the 1981 television adaptation was also included in the score, used to introduce the Guide itself just after Earth's destruction.

== Home media ==
The movie was released on DVD (Region 2, PAL) in the United Kingdom on 5 September 2005. Both a standard double disc edition and a UK-exclusive "Gift Set" edition were released on this date. The standard double disc edition features:

- Making-of
- Additional guide entries (see marketing, above)
- Deleted scenes
- Really deleted scenes (scenes that were never really meant to be in the movie, just for fun)
- Sing-a-long
- Audio commentaries
- Set Top Games: Marvin's Hangman
- Don't Crash (68-minute UK exclusive "making of" documentary, directed by Grant Gee)

The "Gift Set" edition includes a copy of the novel with a "movie tie-in" cover, and collectible prints from the film, packaged in a replica of the film's version of the Hitchhiker's Guide prop.

Single disc widescreen (2.35:1) and full-screen (1.33:1) editions (Region 1, NTSC) were released in the United States and Canada on 13 September 2005. They have a different cover, but contain the same special features (except the Don't Crash documentary) as the UK version.

Single disc releases in the UMD format for the PlayStation Portable were also released on the respective dates in these three countries.

The movie was made available as a paid download in the iTunes Store starting in September 2006, for the American market only. A region-free Blu-ray Disc version was released in January 2007.

== Bibliography ==
- The Hitchhiker's Guide to the Galaxy UK Region 2 DVD Release, 2005. Includes commentaries by Garth Jennings, Nick Goldsmith, Martin Freeman and Bill Nighy, and Robbie Stamp with Sean Sollé. Also includes the documentary Don't Crash: The Making of the Film of the Novel of the Radio Series of The Hitchhiker's Guide to the Galaxy.
- Robbie Stamp, ed. (2005). The Making of The Hitchhiker's Guide to the Galaxy: The Filming of the Douglas Adams Classic. Boxtree. ISBN 0-7522-2585-5.
