= ZIP Beep =

American humor magazine

ZIP Beep was a humor magazine created by J Charles (Chuck) Strinz. It was published monthly from September 1984 to 1989 and was syndicated to over 150 Bulletin Board Systems around the world through BBS Press Service, making it the first ever online humor magazine, and one of the first online magazines. Most of the original 60 monthly issues are now available on the magazine's author's website. The magazine was based in Twin Cities, Minnesota.

The humor in ZIP Beep ranged from topical articles regarding Ronald Reagan, Mickey Mouse, and Jay Leno, to more esoteric technology humor.
