= The European Courier =

- Editor-in-Chief: Sebastian Aulich
- Founder: Sebastian Aulich
- Founded: 2006
- Country: United States
- Based in: New York City

The European Courier is an online, opinion magazine headquartered in New York City and devoted to analysis of international relations, foreign policy of the United States and the European Union, international law and security issues. The magazine's contributors include former prominent diplomats, politicians and academics from several leading universities around the world. It has broad coverage of human rights issues and frequently publishes interviews with heads of states, ambassadors and international law practitioners. The European Courier was founded in 2006 by Sebastian Aulich, a Polish lawyer, who is its editor-in-chief.

== Position on War in Iraq ==
On February 10, 2007, the European Courier published its response to Iraq Study Group Report, in which it claimed that the biggest problem in the Middle East is the Kurdish issue, not Iraq. Without solving the transnational Kurdish problem there will be no stabilization in Iraq. Therefore the U.S. should work to strengthen democracy in Turkey, a nation rooted in Islam but approaching Western standards of development. Close cooperation with Turkey should include allowing Turkey to incorporate the northern part of Iraq (inhabited by Kurds) into its territory to restore balance in the Middle East. Subsequently, Turkey should transform into a federal state and grant autonomy status to Kurds, who, however, should not be permitted to declare independence.

== Key writers ==
The magazine's present and past contributors include former minister of foreign affairs of Bosnia-Herzegovina Muhamed Sacirbey, political scientist Tadeusz A. Kisielewski, historian Dmitry Shlapentokh, economy professor and human rights activist Dr. Scott A. Hipsher, Arabic affairs specialist Dr. Konrad Pedziwiatr, international relations researcher Dr. Kerri Longhurst, political analyst Rick Robinson and others.
