= Regent Theatre, Melbourne =

Theatre and cinema in Melbourne, Victoria

Regent Theatre
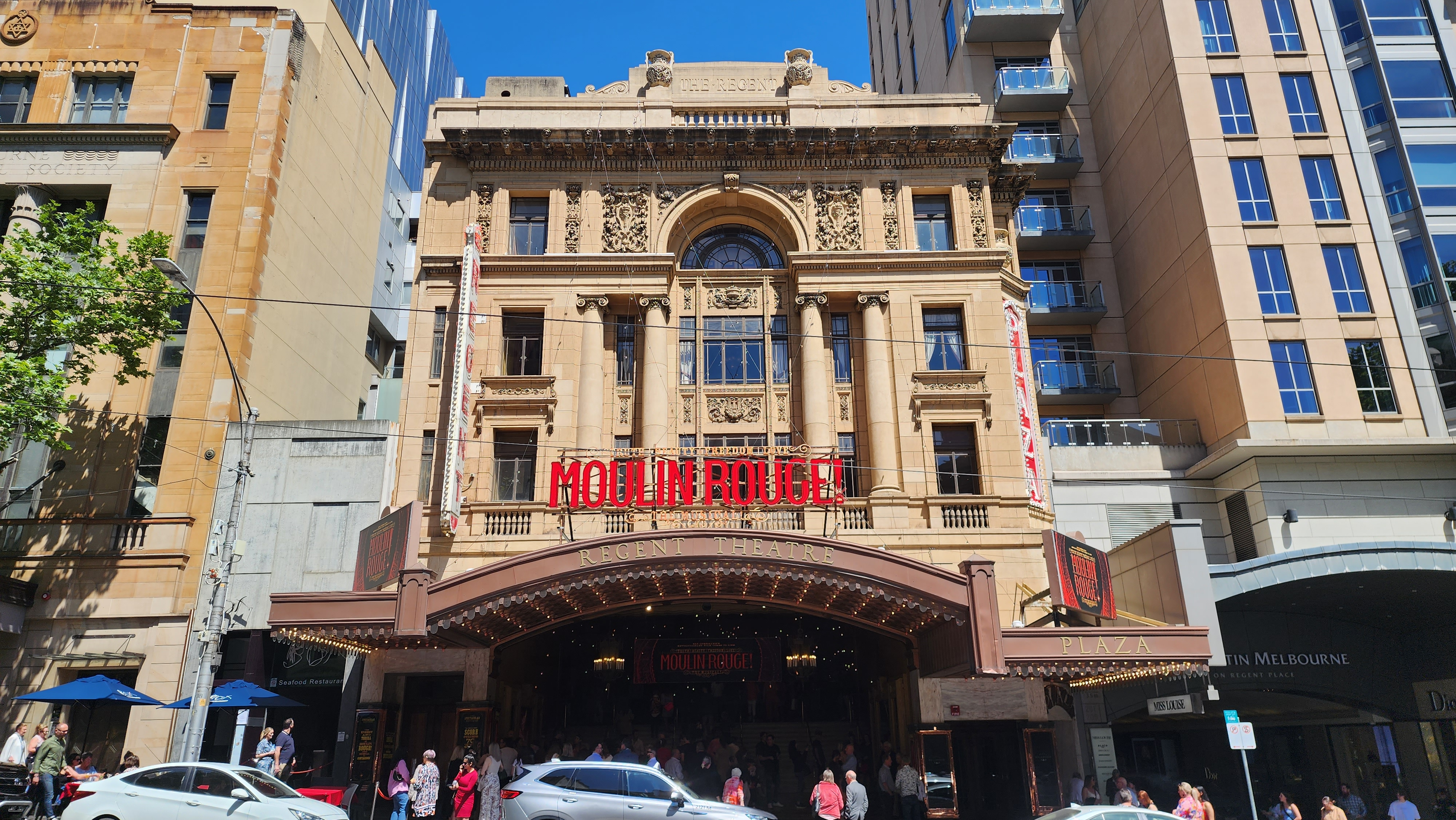
- The Regent Theatre in 2023
- Interactive map of Regent Theatre
- Address: 191 Collins St; Melbourne, Victoria; Australia
- Coordinates: 37.8155°S 144.9675°E
- Owner: Marriner Group
- Capacity: 1,573 (Intimate); 1,751 (Musical); 2,262 (Concert)
- Designation: National Trust of Australia, Victorian Heritage Register
- Current use: musicals, opera, pop concerts, etc.

Construction
- Opened: 15 March 1929
- Reopened: 17 August 1996
- Architect: Ernest Vogel - Original Interior

Website
- www.marrinergroup.com.au

The Regent Theatre is an historic former picture palace built in 1929, closed in 1970, and restored and reopened in 1996 as a live theatre in Collins Street, in the city of Melbourne, Australia. It is one of six city theatres collectively known as Melbourne's East End Theatre District. Designed by Cedric Heise Ballantyne in an ornately palatial style, with a Gothic style lobby, Louis XVI style auditorium, and the Spanish Baroque style Plaza Ballroom in the basement, it is listed by the National Trust of Australia and is on the Victorian Heritage Register.

== Opening and early years ==
The Regent Theatre site on Collins Street was purchased by Hoyts Theatres director Francis W. Thring to be the flagship for his Regent theatre circuit. It was designed by Cedric Ballantyne, a noted theatre architect who had designed earlier theatres for Thring, including the Regent Theatre, Ballarat, and toured movie palaces in the US, drawing inspiration from their eclectic sources such as Spanish Gothic and French Renaissance styles to produce "one of Victoria's largest and most lavish cinemas in the inter-war period." It has an ornately palatial style, with a Gothic style lobby, Louis XVI style auditorium, and Spanish Baroque style Plaza Ballroom in the basement. It was built by built by James Porter & Sons.

The opening of the Regent Theatre on 15 March 1929 was a big event, with the Lord Mayor Cr Luxton in attendance, who declared "this theatre is an architectural asset to the city of which we can all be proud (loud applause)". The theatre had 3,250 seats, came equipped with a Wurlitzer organ as well as an orchestra pit and resident orchestra (to accompany the silent films) and opening night program included a number of live acts, and The Two Lovers, starring Ronald Colman and Vilma Bánky was the feature presentation.

Uniquely, there was a second theatre below the main one, called The Plaza; originally this was to be a cabaret but licensing issues led to the change of use. It was wired for sound, and opened on 10 May 1929 with Alias Jimmy Valentine. In late 1930, F. W. Thring sold his interest in Hoyts to Fox Film.

The cinema was subject to a disastrous fire on 29 April 1945 which destroyed the auditorium, organ, fly tower, and roof, but leaving the foyers and Plaza largely intact. With a dispensation from post-war building restrictions, the Regent was rebuilt much as it was, under the direction of architects Cowper, Murphy & Appleford (who had also redesigned the Regent Theatre in Ballarat after a fire in 1943), making it one of the last picture palaces to be built in this style. Reopening on 19 December 1947, a few changes were made, such as the proscenium being made square instead of arched, and the central bronze chandelier became an imported Czechoslovak crystal design.

The Regent screen was enlarged to play CinemaScope in 1953, opening with the epic The Robe. In 1958 the Plaza was extensively altered to fit a Cinerama screen, and the 1962 epic How the West Was Won ran for two years.

By the 1960s, it became clear that the huge Picture Palaces had had their day, and Hoyts investigated splitting the Regent into two cinemas, but instead the multi-screen Hoyts Cinema Centre opened in Bourke Street in 1969.

== Closure and demolition threat ==
On 1 July 1970, Hoyts shut the doors of the Regent for the last time. The South Yarra Regent closed the same night and the Ballarat Regent closed the same year. The Plaza closed in November of that year, and in December 1970, an auction was held at the theatre where everything that was not bolted down was auctioned off, raising a few thousand dollars.

In response to the closure and clouds over the building's future, a "Save the Regent" committee was soon formed by former theatre staff, theatre enthusiasts and others including Loris Webster, who ran a nearby cafe) to campaign for its preservation.

The Regent was located next to the site that the Melbourne City Council finally chose in 1966 for the much talked about City Square project, and Council soon moved to purchase the closed theatre to enable a larger scale redevelopment, at first including a high-rise hotel. The Council's decision to purchase the Regent was one of the factors that, ironically, ensured the theatres' survival, since they were subject to public pressure where a private owner would not have been.

In 1974 the National Trust declined to list the theatre, claiming it was not of sufficient significance. The same year Lord Mayor Alan Douglas Whalley demanded that the Regent be demolished, presenting a report headed by Sir Roy Grounds to quell the conservationists and claiming that the Regent was not worthy of preservation in declaring that it was "not the Colosseum". The council argued that the long blank side wall of the Regent would compromise architects abilities to create grand visions for the site.

Save The Regent maintained their pressure, and responded with a petition of 2000 signatures to the City Council.

Later that year, the next Lord Mayor Ron Walker supported his predecessor, however Builders Labourers Federation secretary Norm Gallagher announced a green ban on the building preventing demolition.

In 1975, Victorian premier Rupert Hamer established a public inquiry which heard evidence from all parties, and concluded the Regent should be saved as a theatre and concert venue associated with the City Square, to the displeasure of the City Council. He then offered up to $2 million in interest-free loans to restore and maintain it, but nothing eventuated.

In 1979 the National Trust reversed its stance and classified the theatre. However it was not until 12 October 1988 that the site was successfully nominated to the Victorian Heritage Register, and then upgraded its classification to national level after the restoration). In 1980 with the Regent still empty, the City Square finally opened, incorporating the space of the Plaza Theatre, with the interior was gutted leaving only the ceiling intact. Though the 1980s, proposals came and went, often involving putting the building out to tender, without any offer of funding, including as an art centre, a ballet centre, and as a Casino and poker machine venue.

Following the controversial demolition of the Regent in Sydney in 1988, by the 1990s, the significance and fate of Australia's remaining "picture palaces" was becoming an important issue. Most regional grand movie theatres had been lost, as well as all the major cinemas in Brisbane (only the lobby of the Regent Theatre remained), Adelaide, and Perth, but many of the major picture palaces remained in Sydney and Melbourne, though most in a poor state. Much of the decoration of the Capitol Theatre in Sydney had been removed, the State Theatre remained intact but little used, Melbourne's Capitol Theatre had lost its stalls and faced an uncertain future, and the Forum Theatre had become a megachurch.

In 1992, the city council voted on a proposal to demolish the Regent and approve the redevelopment of the site as part of a commercial precinct consisting of multi-storey retail buildings, however council voted down the proposal.

The Regent eventually lay unused for 26 years.

== Restoration and reopening ==
Entrepreneur David Marriner, who had earlier restored the historic Princess Theatre (Melbourne), bringing the new breed of musical theatre to Melbourne, proposed a complicated deal to the Melbourne City Council and the new State Government led by Jeff Kennett which involved the restoration of the theatre for musicals in return for developing a large hotel on part of the City Square, itself proposed for redevelopment. The State Government would purchase a half share of the theatre, with the money going to the refurbishment, while Marriner's purchase price for half the square from the Council would also go to the refurbishment, which ultimately cost $25 million. The redevelopment, which was undertaken by commercial builder Hansen Yuncken, took 3 years from September 1993, and involved complete overhaul, repairs, new services, installation of extensive stage facilities, recreation of decorative fixtures and finishes including much of the furniture and the ornate street front ticket booth (since removed again), and creation of a new stalls lobby in matching style. Using photos supplied by a member of the Save The Regent Theatre Committee, Ian Williams, the Plaza Theatre was also fully and magnificently restored to its original ballroom format. The work was overseen by heritage architects Lovell Chen.

The Regent Theatre reopened with a gala event on 17 August 1996, and on 26 October Andrew Lloyd Webber's Sunset Boulevard premiered.

== 2019 refurbishment ==
In April 2019, Marriner Group in partnership with the building's owners, the Victorian State Government and the Melbourne City Council, commenced a major refurbishment of the Regent Theatre auditorium. Alongside cosmetic upgrades including replica heritage pattern carpets and paintwork repair, the major construction component was an extension to the Dress Circle balcony, bringing it four meters closer to the stage in order to improve the relationship between audience and stage. Additional work was undertaken to improve the theatre design including a new seating layout and refined floor rake to improve sight lines to the stage. The project took eight months to complete and cost an estimate $19.4 million. Building was undertaken by ICON Construction, overseen by Lovell Chen.

The Regent Theatre reopened on 11 January 2020 with the National Theatre's production of War Horse, the first play at the theatre in its then 90-year history.

== Shows ==
The theatre is mostly used for large-scale musicals. Over the years, the Regent has seen many live shows, including:

- 1996 - Sunset Boulevard (musical)
- 1997 - Fiddler on the Roof (musical)
- 1998 - Show Boat (musical)
- 1999 - Live at the Regent Theatre – 1st July 1999 (John Farnham concert)
- 2001 - Annie (musical)
- 2001 - Singin' in the Rain (musical)
- 2001 - The Wizard of Oz (adaptation of the 1939 film by John Kane)
- 2002 - Man of La Mancha (musical)
- 2002 - Oliver! (musical)
- 2003 - The Merry Widow (operetta)
- 2003 - Ned Kelly (film premiere)
- 2003 - We Will Rock You (musical)
- 2004 - Melbourne International Comedy Festival Gala; APRA Music Awards; AFI Awards
- 2004 - Gone with the Wind
- 2004 - The Rocky Horror Show (benefit concert starring the cast of Neighbours)
- 2005 - The Lion King (musical)
- 2007 - The Wizard of Oz (film with live orchestra)
- 2007 - Imperial Russian Dance Company's Flying Tzars
- 2007 - Melbourne International Comedy Festival Gala
- 2007 - Matthew Bourne's Swan Lake
- 2007 - Priscilla Queen of the Desert - the Musical
- 2008 - Wicked (musical)
- 2009 - Swan Lake (ballet)
- 2009 - Jason Alexander's Comedy Spectacular (stand-up)
- 2010 - Cats (musical)
- 2010 - Fame (musical)
- 2010 - West Side Story (musical)
- 2011 - The Music of Andrew Lloyd Webber (tribute concert)
- 2011 - Love Never Dies (musical)
- 2012 - Annie (musical)
- 2013 - King Kong (musical) - world premiere
- 2014 - Wicked (musical) - return season
- 2014/2015 - Grease (musical) - return season
- 2015 - The Lion King (musical) - return season
- 2015/2016 - Cats (musical) - return season
- 2016 - Ghost the Musical (musical)
- 2016 - The Sound of Music (musical)
- 2016 - Tannhäuser (opera)
- 2016 - We Will Rock You - return season
- 2017 - Ladies in Black (musical) - return season
- 2017 - My Fair Lady (musical)
- 2017 - The Bodyguard (musical)
- 2018 - Priscilla Queen of the Desert - the Musical
- 2018 - The Wizard of Oz (musical)
- 2019 - Jersey Boys (musical) - return season
- 2020 - War Horse (play)
- 2020 - Billy Elliot the Musical
- 2021 - Das Rheingold
- 2021 - David Walliam's The Midnight Gang
- 2021 - Chess the Musical
- 2021 - Moulin Rouge! The Musical
- 2022 - Rodgers + Hammerstein's Cinderella
- 2022 - Hairspray (musical)
- 2022 - Joseph and the Amazing Technicolor Dreamcoat (musical)
- 2023 - & Juliet (musical)
- 2023/2024 - Moulin Rouge! The Musical - return season
- 2024 - Wicked (musical)
- 2024 - Oscar (ballet)
- 2024/2025 - Sister Act (musical)
- 2025 - Beetlejuice (musical)
- 2025/2026 - Anastasia (musical)
- 2026 - Pretty Woman (musical)
