= ŽVPL =

ŽVPL is Slovenia's oldest independent webzine, and was first published on May 18, 1998. It all started out on a drinking crusade which lasted for 42 days, when the editor-in-chief Davorin Pavlica and his friend / programmer Luka Ferlan realized that Slovenia does not have a proper entertainment webzine. They swapped beer for a keyboard, and in only one week, they published a webzine called ŽVPL.

ŽVPL is an acronym for "Party guide to Ljubljana" in Slovenian, and was inspired by Douglas Adams' novel The Hitchhiker's Guide to the Galaxy - the name for the webzine, not the webzine itself. It announces and reviews events, parties, concerts for all Slovenia; you can find domestic and international music news, movie reviews, and much more.

== List of ŽVPL's editors ==
The editors include:

- Luka Ferlan (editor-in-chief, 1998–1999)
- Davorin Pavlica (editor, 1998–1999; editor-in-chief, 1999–2013)
- Gregor Zalaznik (editor, 1999–2013)
- Mare Vavpotič (editor of photography, 1999–2013)
- Alja Kink (2013–present)

== List of ŽVPL's founders ==
The founders are Luka Ferlan, Martin Modic and Davorin Pavlica.
