= A Little Soul =

1998 single by Pulp

Single by Pulp

from the album This Is Hardcore
- B-side: "Cocaine Socialism"; "Like a Friend"; "That Boy's Evil"
- Released: 8 June 1998
- Length: 3:23
- Label: Island
- Songwriters: Nick Banks; Jarvis Cocker; Candida Doyle; Steve Mackey; Mark Webber
- Producer: Chris Thomas

Pulp singles chronology
"This Is Hardcore" (1998)	"A Little Soul" (1998)	"Party Hard" (1998)

"A Little Soul" is a song by British alternative rock band Pulp, from their 1998 album, This Is Hardcore. It was released on 8 June 1998 as the third single from the album, charting at number 22 on the UK Singles Chart.

== B-sides ==
"Cocaine Socialism" surfaced as a "proper recorded version" on the 2006 deluxe edition reissue of the This Is Hardcore album. The song features very similar music but almost entirely different lyrics to the song "Glory Days" which features on the album. "Like a Friend" was featured in the 1998 film Great Expectations, and a music video for the song was produced for US music television networks featuring footage from the film. "That Boy's Evil" features no vocals from Jarvis Cocker and was originally released as a white label vinyl by Cocker and Mackey's side project The Chocolate Layers and features spoken word samples from other media in a similar style to Black Box Recorders' "The Facts of Life (Chocolate Layers Remix)"

== Track listings ==
All lyrics are written by Jarvis Cocker; all music is composed by Nick Banks, Jarvis Cocker, Candida Doyle, Steve Mackey and Mark Webber.

UK CD1
No.	Title	Length
1.	"A Little Soul" (original mix)
2.	"Cocaine Socialism"
3.	"Like a Friend"

UK CD2
No.	Title	Length
1.	"A Little Soul" (alternative mix)
2.	"A Little Soul" (Lafayette Velvet revisited remix) (remixed by Kid Loco)
3.	"That Boy's Evil"

UK cassette single
No.	Title	Length
1.	"A Little Soul" (original mix)
2.	"Cocaine Socialism"

== Personnel ==
- Jarvis Cocker: Vocals
- Mark Webber: Guitars
- Candida Doyle: Piano
- Anne Dudley: Strings
- Steve Mackey: Bass Guitar
- Nick Banks: Drums

== Charts ==
Chart (1998)	Peak position
Scotland Singles (Official Charts)	27
UK Singles (Official Charts)	22
UK Airplay (Media Control UK)	47

== Release history ==
Region	Date	Format(s)	Label(s)	Ref.
United Kingdom	8 June 1998	CD; cassette	Island	
Japan	24 June 1998	CD	Island	
