= Access Magazine =

Academic publication

- Editor: Donald Shoup (Editor in Chief); John A. Mathews (Managing Editor)
- Categories: Transportation, Urban Planning
- Frequency: Biannual
- Founded: 1992
- Final issue: 2017 (print)
- Company: UCTC / UCCONNECT
- Country: United States
- Based in: Los Angeles
- Language: English
- Website: ACCESS Magazine

ACCESS Magazine that existed in print from 1992 and 2017 reports on research at the University of California Transportation Center and the University of California Center on Economic Competitiveness (UCCONNECT). The goal is to translate academic research into readable prose that is useful for policymakers and practitioners. Articles in ACCESS are intended to catapult academic research into debates about public policy, and convert knowledge into action. Authors of papers reporting on research here are solely responsible for their content. Much of the research appearing in ACCESS was sponsored by the US Department of Transportation and the California Department of Transportation, neither of which is liable for its content or use.

== History and profile ==
ACCESS was founded in 1992 by Melvin M. Webber, Professor of City and Regional Planning at the University of California, Berkeley, and has grown to become one of the most widely read publications of transportation research. In 2013, the magazine had over 8,500 subscribers. In Spring 2016, the magazine had printed 48 issues. Last print issue appeared in Spring 2017 and it became an online publication.

ACCESS is regularly referenced, reprinted, and translated in publications, including:

- Al Jazeera America
- American Institute of Architects, Los Angeles Chapter
- ASU News
- the Atlantic
- CityLab
- Austin Contrarian
- Be A Green Commuter
- BikeWalk Centerlines Newsletter
- Fortune
- GO Trans Explorer
- KTVU.com
- Horse Talk, New Zealand
- the Huffington Post
- the Houston Chronicle
- LA Streets Blog
- the Los Angeles Times
- the New York Times
- the Observer
- PhysOrg
- Planetizen
- Pollution Free Cities
- Reconnecting America
- Safe Routes to School California
- Saporta Report
- Sac Scribd
- The City Fix
- the Telegraph
- Toll Road News
- Transport Policy
- Transportation-Public Health Link
- Transportation Research Board
- Transport Economics: Critical Concepts
- University of California, Davis Institute of Transportation Studies
- UCLA Institute of the Environment and Sustainability
- UCLA Luskin School of Public Affairs
- UCLA Sustainability
- UCLA Today
- Urban Transport of China
- U.S. News & World Report
- the Washington Post
- Wired

The following Top 25 Planetizen ranked Urban Planning programs use ACCESS articles in their curricula:

1. University of California, Los Angeles
2. Cornell University
3. Rutgers University
4. University of North Carolina at Chapel Hill
5. Portland State University
6. Florida State University

The Editor is Donald Shoup, Professor of Urban Planning at UCLA.

The Managing Editor is John A. Mathews.

ACCESS is published twice a year during the fall and spring.

== Awards ==
In 2013, ACCESS Magazine was named “Organization of the Year” at the 24th Annual California Transportation Funding (CTF) Transportation Awards. The CTF cited ACCESS as the “face of the University of California Transportation Center” and commended the Magazine for publishing “incisive commentary on transportation issues of the day.”

In 2014, ACCESS Magazine received the American Planning Association's (APA) 2014 National Planning Excellence Awards: Communications Initiative as well as APA California's 2014 Communications Initiative Award. Also in 2014, ACCESS Magazine was awarded the Certificate of Excellence from the Western Publishing Association, Finalist: “Initial Trade Print Categories: Semi-Annuals, Three-Time, and Quarterly.”
