= Mark Webber (guitarist) =

English guitarist

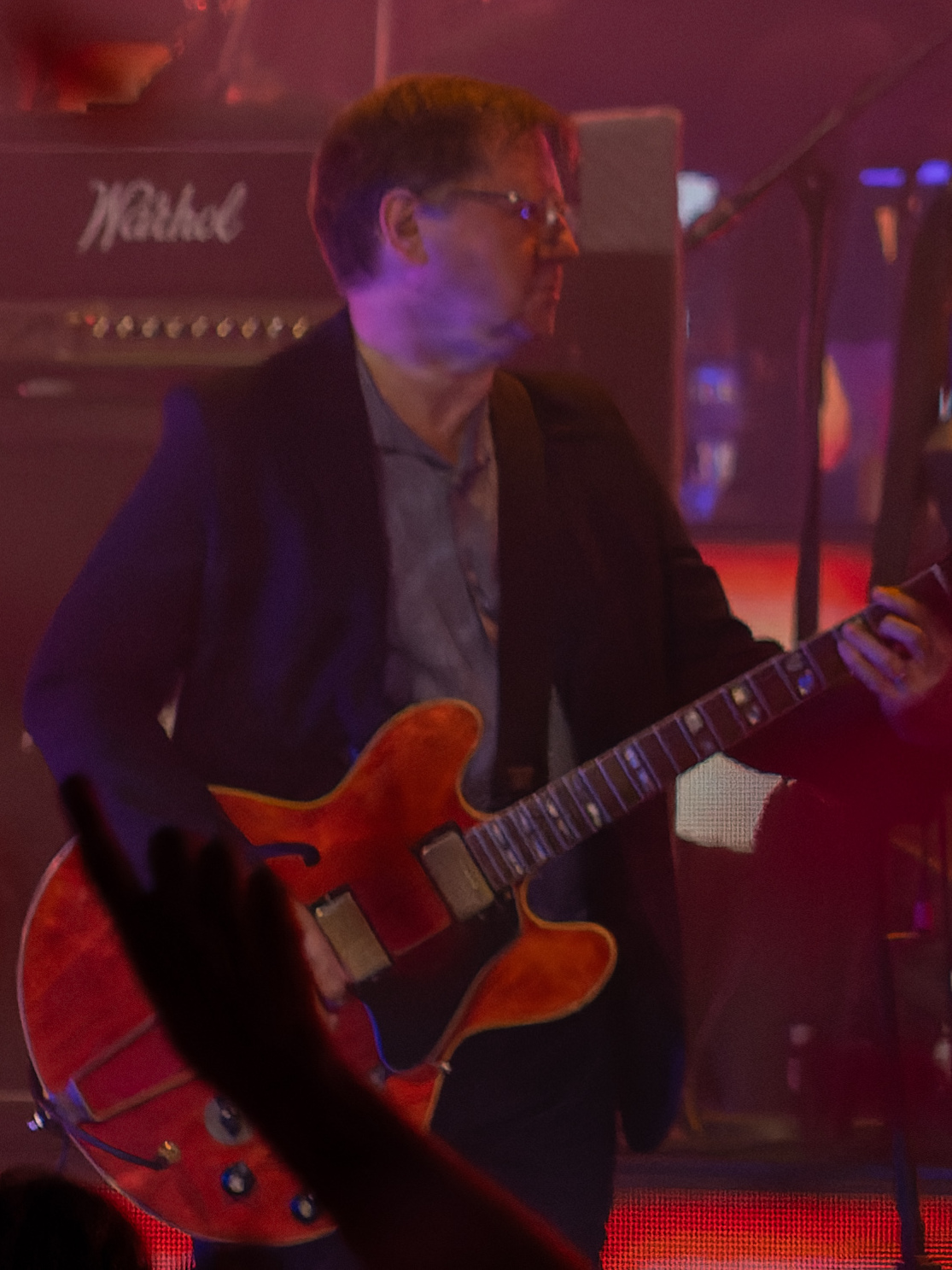
Webber with Pulp in 2023

Mark Andrew Webber (born 1970 in Chesterfield, Derbyshire) is an English rock guitarist.

== Biography ==
He is most famous for playing in Pulp (since 1995), and appearing on all of their albums since their Mercury Music Prize-winning LP Different Class. Webber first met the band in 1986 while producing a fanzine called Cosmic Pig. He was originally the president of Pulp's fan club. Before joining the group Webber had helped make stage sets and was their tour manager.

Webber's musical instruments include: Gretsch Viking guitar, Gibson ES-345, Gibson Les Paul Custom guitar, Gibson Firebird guitar, Yamaha acoustic, Fender Jazzmaster, and Rhodes Piano.

In 1998 Webber curated the "Underground America" film presentation at the Barbican. When Pulp started a decade-long break in 2001, Webber travelled the world presenting avant garde films. He is a fan of the Velvet Underground and has been influenced by Andy Warhol. His amplifier on stage can often be seen to bear the legend "Warhol". He is also a pianist and has played piano on a few Pulp songs.

In September 2024, Webber published the book, I'm With Pulp, Are You?, a personal history of the band illustrated with photos and ephemera from his own extensive collection.
