= Jarvis Cocker discography =

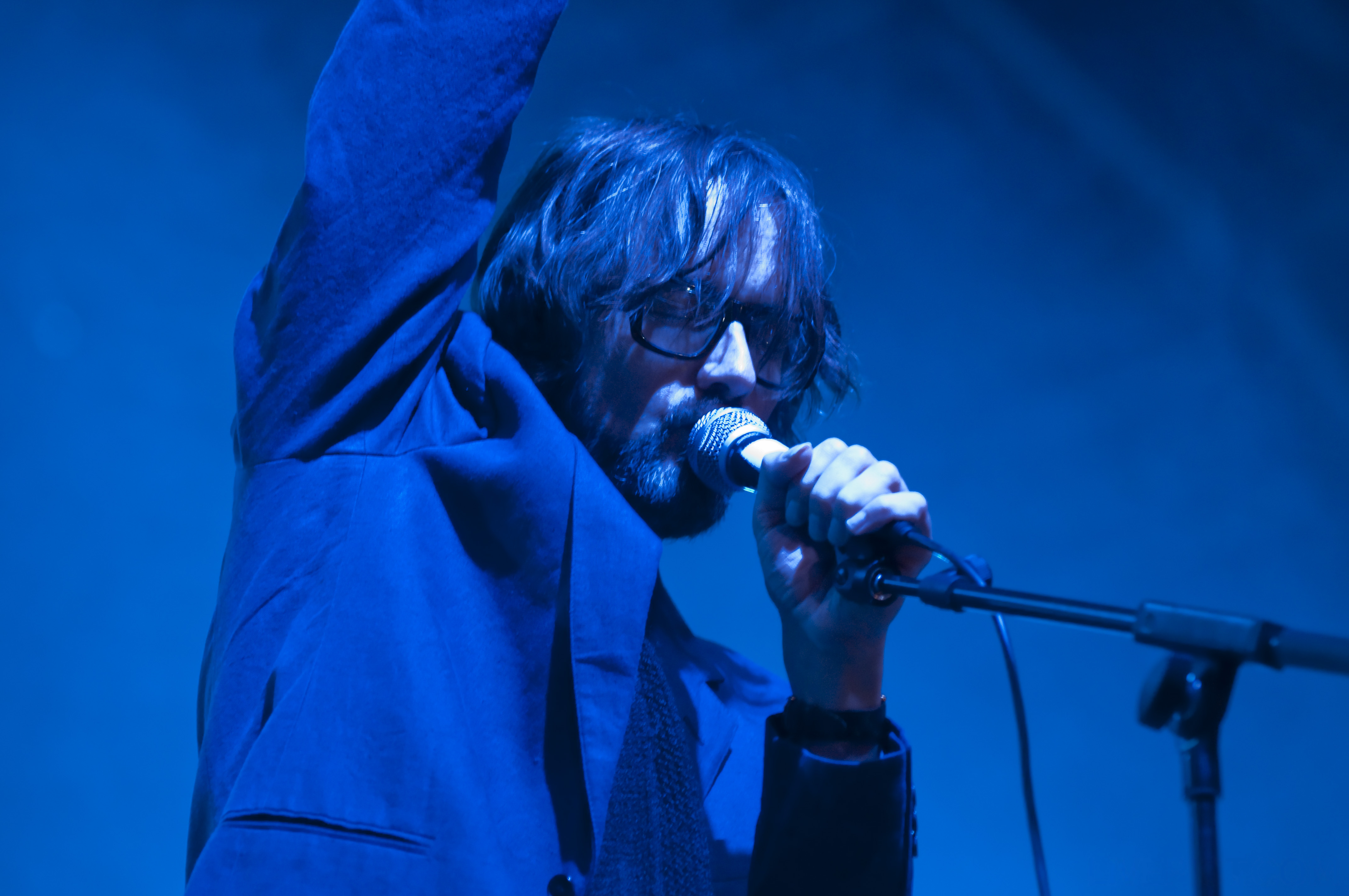
- Jarvis Cocker, 2009
- Studio albums: 6
- Extended plays: 2
- Singles: 12
- Music videos: 10
- Other tracks: 21

The solo discography of Jarvis Cocker, an English musician, consists of five studio albums, six singles and numerous collaborations with other artists. He is best known as the founder, frontman and songwriter for the band Pulp.

He has also released seven studio albums, one extended play, 10 compilation albums and 24 singles with Pulp, and one album and two extended plays with his other band Relaxed Muscle, which he formed with Darren Buckle. This discography does not contain work released by those bands.

Cocker embarked on his solo career after Pulp entered an extended hiatus from 2003.

== Albums ==
=== Studio albums ===
Year	Title	Peak chart positions										Certification
Year	Title	UK	AUT	BEL	FRA	GER	NLD	SPA	SWE	SWI	US	Certification
2006	Jarvis: Release: 13 November 2006; Label: Rough Trade; Formats: CD, LP, digital download	37	—	—	93	—	—	—	39	—	— (Note: Jarvis did not chart in the Billboard 200 chart, it charted at #13 in the US Top Heatseekers chart and #34 in the Top Independent Albums chart.)	BPI: Silver
2009	Further Complications: Release: 18 May 2009; Label: Rough Trade; Format: CD, LP, digital download	19	—	—	190	—	—	—	—	—	155 (Note: "Further Complications." also charted at #5 in the US Top Heatseekers chart, #21 in the Top Independent Albums chart and #50 in the Top Rock Albums chart.)	
2017	Room 29 (with Chilly Gonzales): Release: 17 March 2017; Label: Deutsche Grammophon; Format: CD, LP, digital download	88	43	140	90	49	161	—	—	80	— (Note: Room 29 did not chart in the Billboard 200 chart, it charted at #10 in the US Classical Crossover albums chart.)	
2020	Beyond the Pale (with Jarv Is): Release: 17 July 2020; Label: Rough Trade; Format: CD, LP, digital download	11	28	107	136	85	—	99	—	55	—	
2021	Chansons d'Ennui Tip-Top: Release: 22 October 2021; Label: ABKCO; Format: CD, LP, digital download	— (Note: Chansons d'Ennui Tip-Top did not chart in the UK Albums chart, it charted at #55 in the UK Albums Sales chart.)	—	—	—	—	—	—	—	—	—	
2022	This Is Going to Hurt: Original Soundtrack (with Jarv Is): Release: 21 March 2022; Label: Rough Trade; Format: LP, digital download	— (Note: This Is Going to Hurt: Original Soundtrack did not chart in the UK Albums chart, it charted at #10 in the UK Soundtrack Albums chart.)	—	—	—	—	—	—	—	—	—	
"—" denotes albums that did not chart.

=== Remix albums ===
Year	Details	Peak chart positions
Year	Details	UK
2021	Remix Ed (with Jarv Is): Released: 26 November 2021; Label: Rough Trade; Format: LP, digital download	— (Note: Remix Ed did not chart in the UK Albums chart, it charted at #5 in the UK Dance Albums chart.)

== Extended plays ==
Year	EP details
2016	Likely Stories: Released: 20 May 2016; Label: Rough Trade; Format: LP, digital download
2020	Suite for Iain & Jane: Released: 4 December 2020; Label: Rough Trade; Format: LP

== Singles ==
Year	Title	Peak chart positions		Album
Year	Title	UK	UK Indie	Album
2006	"Running the World" ( (Note: "Running the World" is a digital download only single which charted in 2019.))	48	7	Jarvis
2007	"Don't Let Him Waste Your Time"	36	1	Jarvis
2007	"Fat Children"	158	2	Jarvis
2008	"Temptation" (with Beth Ditto)	148	—	Non-album single
2009	"Angela"	—	4	"Further Complications."
2009	""Further Complications."" / "Girls Like It Too" ( (Note: The A-side "Girls Like It Too" did not appear on the Further Complications album.))	—	—	"Further Complications."
2019	"Must I Evolve?"	—	—	Beyond the Pale
2020	"Running the World" (with Kaiser Quartett)	—	—	Non-album single
2020	"House Music All Night Long"	—	—	Beyond the Pale
2020	"Save the Whale"	—	—	Beyond the Pale
2020	"Jimmy"	—	—	Non-album single
2021	"Swanky Modes (Dennis Bovell Mixes)"	— (Note: "Swanky Modes" did not chart in the UK Singles chart, it charted at #98 in the UK Singles Sales chart.)	—	Remix Ed
"—" denotes a recording that did not chart or was not released in that territory.

=== As featured artist ===
Year	Title	Album
2003	"I Picked a Flower" (The Nu Forest featuring Jarvis Cocker and The Pastels)	The Last Great Wilderness
2010	"Synchronize" (Discodeine featuring Jarvis Cocker)	Discodeine
2011	"Avalanche (Terminal Velocity)" (Boys Noize and Erol Alkan featuring Jarvis Cocker)	Non-album singles
2017	"Red Right Hand" (Iggy Pop and Jarvis Cocker)	Non-album singles
2018	"Capitol" (Daniel Knox featuring Jarvis Cocker)	Chasescene
2021	"Straight to the Morning" (Hot Chip featuring Jarvis Cocker)	Non-album singles
2021	"Let's Stick Around" (Riton featuring Jarvis Cocker)	Non-album singles

== As featured artist ==
List of guest appearances, with other performing artists, showing year released and album name
Year	Title	Other artist(s)	Album
1996	"Ciao!" (Lush featuring Jarvis Cocker)	Lush	Lovelife
1996	"Set the Controls for the Heart of the Pelvis"	Barry Adamson	Oedipus Schmoedipus
1999	"Drive Safely Darling"	All Seeing I	Pickled Eggs and Sherbet
2000	"Thinking About the New Millennium, Just Makes Me Wanna Come"	Various Artists	Millennium Thoughts
2001	"This Is Where I Came In"	Alpha	South EP
2001	"Everybody Loves the Underdog"	Various Artists	Mike Bassett: England Manager (Soundtrack from the Film)
2002	"Sliding Through Life on Charm" (Marianne Faithfull featuring Jarvis Cocker)	Marianne Faithfull	Kissin Time
2002	"The Cheat" (Jarvis Cocker and Richard Hawley)	Various Artists	Total Lee! The Songs of Lee Hazlewood
2003	"Into U" (Richard X featuring Jarvis Cocker)	Richard X	Richard X Presents His X-Factor Vol. 1
2003	"I Need Something Stronger" (Unkle featuring Brian Eno and Jarvis Cocker)	Unkle	Never, Never, Land
2005	"Do the Hippogriff" "This Is the Night" "Magic Works" (as part of The Weird Sisters))	Patrick Doyle	Harry Potter and the Goblet of Fire: Original Motion Picture Soundtrack
2006	"I Just Came to Tell You That I'm Going" (with Kid Loco)	Various Artists	Monsieur Gainsbourg Revisited
2006	"I Can't Forget"	Various Artists	Leonard Cohen: I'm Your Man - Motion Picture Soundtrack
2006	"A Drop of Nelson's Blood"	Various Artists	Rogue's Gallery: Pirate Ballads, Sea Songs, and Chanteys
2007	"The Lion and Albert"	Dave Boulter and Stuart A. Staples	Songs for the Young at Heart
2007	"One Hell of a Party" "The Duelist" (Air featuring Jarvis Cocker)	Air	Pocket Symphony
2008	"Somewhere (A Place For Us)" (Marianne Faithfull with Jarvis Cocker)	Marianne Faithfull	Easy Come, Easy Go
2009	"Fantastic Mr Fox AKA Petey's Song"	Various Artists	Fantastic Mr. Fox: Original Soundtrack
2014	"What If We" (Marram featuring Jarvis Cocker)	Marram	Sun Choir
2014	"Worship Me Now"	Marc Almond	The Dancing Marquis
2014	"Eyes That Say "I Love You""	Various Artists	Beck Song Reader
2015	"The Battle Is Done With"	Various Artists	Joy of Living: A Tribute to Ewan MacColl
2015	"Completely Sun" (Pilooski featuring Jarvis Cocker)	Pilooski	Isola
2017	"Century"	Feist	Pleasure
2018	"Elvis Has Left the Building"	Anton Sanko	Amanda: Bande originale du film
2019	"The Interrogative Mood" (with David Cunningham)	Various Artists	Music From Jarvis Cocker's Sunday Service
2020	"In the Bleak Midwinter" "Snow Is Falling In Manhattan"	Chilly Gonzales	A Very Chilly Christmas

== As writer or session musician ==
List of guest appearances, with other performing artists, showing year released and album name
Year	Other artist(s)	Album	Contribution
1999	All Seeing I	Pickled Eggs and Sherbet	co-writer on "Walk like a Panther", "First Man in Space", "Happy Birthday Nichola"
2004	Nancy Sinatra	Nancy Sinatra	writer, percussion and producer on "Don't Let Him Waste Your Time" and "Baby's Coming Back to Me"
2005	The Lovers	The Lovers	co-writer on "La Degustation", "Basque Country" and "Fred de Fred"
2006	Charlotte Gainsbourg	5:55	co-writer on the title track
2008	David Byrne and Brian Eno	Everything That Happens Will Happen Today	uncredited guitar

== Other ==
- The Trip (curated with Steve Mackey) (2006)
- Music From Jarvis Cocker’s Sunday Service (2019)
- This House is... closing theme to the film The House (2022)

== Music videos ==
Year	Song	Director(s)	Album
2007	"Running the World"		Jarvis
2007	"Don't Let Him Waste Your Time"		Jarvis
2009	"Further Complications"	Stephanie Di Giusto	Further Complications
2009	"Angela"		Further Complications
2017	"Tearjerker"		Room 29
2017	"The Tearjerker Returns"		Room 29
2017	"Room 29"	Jarvis Cocker	Room 29
2017	"Clara"	Jarvis Cocker	Room 29
2020	"House Music All Night Long"		Beyond the Pale
2021	"Aline"	Wes Anderson	Chansons d'Ennui Tip-Top
