= Ladykillers =

The Ladykillers or Ladykillers may refer to:

- The Ladykillers (1955 film), a comedy starring Alec Guinness
  - The Ladykillers (2004 film), a remake featuring Tom Hanks
  - The Ladykillers (play), a 2011 stage adaptation of the 1955 film
- Ladykillers (film), an unrelated 1988 made-for-TV movie
- National Lampoon's Lady Killers, a 2003 comedy film
- "Ladykillers" (song), a song from the album Lovelife by Lush
- "Lady Killers" (G-Eazy song), a song from the album Must Be Nice by G-Eazy
- "Lady Killers (TV series)", a British TV series

== See also ==
- Lady Killer (disambiguation)
