= Angela (Jarvis Cocker song) =

Single by Jarvis Cocker

from the album Further Complications
- Released: 17 April 2009
- Recorded: 2008
- Genre: Britpop, baggy
- Length: 2:56
- Label: Rough Trade
- Songwriter(s): Jarvis Cocker
- Producer(s): Steve Albini

Jarvis Cocker singles chronology
"Fat Children" (2007)	"Angela" (2009)	"Further Complications./Girls Like It Too" (2009)

"Angela" is a 2009 single by Jarvis Cocker. It is the first single from his second solo album "Further Complications".

Cocker told Q magazine that the song was about "thwarted lust." He elaborated to NME about the song: "Angela is the girlfriend of our keyboard player, Simon Stafford, but I didn't realize that at the time. I was singing these words and I noticed that he was looking at me in a strange way. He said, "Why have you written a song about my girlfriend?" I'd forgotten that she was called Angela, so I think he thought I was trying to maybe move in on her. I assured him it was a co-incidence."

The single was released digitally on 17 April 2009. The song impacted US radio on May 12. It was released as a limited edition vinyl single on 15 June with a song called "I Found Myself Looking for God" as the B-side.

== Track listing ==
1. "Angela"
2. "I Found Myself Looking for God"
