= Lady Killer =

Lady Killer or Ladykiller may refer to:

== Literature ==
=== Novels ===
- The Lady-Killer, a 1902 book by Henry De Vere Stacpoole
- Lady Killer (novel), a 1951 novel by Anthony Gilbert
- Lady Killer, a 1958 novel by Ed McBain
- The Lady Killer, a 1993 novel written by Martina Cole
- Lady Killer, a novel in the Rosato & Associates series

=== Comics and short stories ===
- Lady Killer, a character in The Strangers (Malibu Comics) series
- Lady Killer (comic book), a comic book series by Joëlle Jones and Jamie S. Rich, published by Dark Horse Comics since 2015
- "Lady Killer", a story in the DC Comics anthology Weird Mystery Tales

== Film and television ==
=== Films ===
- The Lady Killer (1913 film), a silent short
- Lady Killer (1933 film), starring James Cagney
- Lady Killer (1937 film) (Gueule d'amour), directed by Jean Grémillon
- Lady Killer (1992 film), a 1992 Yugoslavian film
- Lady Killer (1995 film), a drama directed by Steven Schachter
- Scene of the Crime (1996 film), also known as Ladykiller, starring Ben Gazzara
- The Lady Killer (2023 film), a Hindi language action-drama film

=== Television ===
- "Lady Killer" (Person of Interest), an episode of Person of Interest
- "Lady Killer", an episode of Charlie's Angels
- "Lady Killer", as episode of The Lone Ranger
- "Lady Killer", the first episode of Thriller
- "Lady Killer", an episode of The New Breed
- "Lady Killer", an episode of Riptide
- "Lady Killer", an episode of the reality series Life of Ryan
- "The Lady Killer", an episode of The Roy Rogers Show
- "The Lady Killer", half of a Cold Case Files episode
- "The Lady Killer", an episode of Pretty Little Liars

== Music ==
- The Lady Killer (album), a 2010 album by CeeLo Green
- "Lady Killer" (Kreesa Turner song), by Canadian singer Kreesha Turner
- "Ladykillers" (song), a song by Lush
- "Lady Killer", a song on the John Entwistle album Mad Dog
- "Lady Killer", from the 2000 Spitfire album Race Riot
- "Ladykiller", a Maroon 5 song on the album Overexposed
- "Lady Killer", a Lita Ford song on the album Dancin' on the Edge
- "Lady Killer", from the debut album Flash and the Pan
- "Lady Killa", by British rapper M.I.A.
- "Lady Killer", a Racer X song on the album Second Heat
- "Lady Killer" by Andrew Jackson Jihad from the album Candy Cigarettes and Cap Guns
- "Ladykiller", by the Vandals, from their When in Rome Do as The Vandals album
- "Ladykiller", a song by the Saturdays from the "All Fired Up" single
- "Lady Killer", a song by Priestess from the album Prior to the Fire

== Other uses ==
- Lady Killer, a variety of snow crocus

== See also ==
- Ladykillers (disambiguation)
