= The Moths Are Real =

Studio album by Serafina Steer
- Released: January 14, 2013
- Genre: Rock
- Length: 45:15
- Label: Stolen
- Producer: Jarvis Cocker

Serafina Steer chronology
Change Is Good (2010)	The Moths Are Real (2013)

Singles from The Moths Are Real
- 1. "Night Before Mutiny" Released: November 9, 2012; 2. "Island Odyssey" Released: January 11, 2013; 3. "Lady Fortune" Released: 26 July 2013

Professional ratings
Aggregate scores
Source	Rating
Metacritic	74/100
Review scores
Source	Rating
Drowned in Sound	8/10
The Guardian	4/5 stars
musicOMH	4/5 stars
NME	4/5 stars

The Moths Are Real is a studio album by the singer-songwriter Serafina Steer. It was released in January 2013 by Stolen Recordings. It was produced by Jarvis Cocker.

== Critical reception ==
The Quietus wrote that "this is never twee, but witty, subversive and at times sensual, the power dynamic between male and female, dream and reality hard to place as Steer's voice arches and meanders over the melody."

== Track listing ==
No.	Title	Length
1.	"Night Before Mutiny"	5:01
2.	"Machine Room"	3:17
3.	"Ballad of Brick Lane"	3:29
4.	"Lady Fortune"	4:30
5.	"Skinny Dipping"	3:30
6.	"The Removal Man"	4:12
7.	"World of Love"	3:45
8.	"Has Anyone Ever Liked You?"	1:53
9.	"Island Odyssey"	3:10
10.	"Alien Invasion"	3:39
11.	"Disco Compilation"	4:35
12.	"The Moths Are Real"	4:12
