= Aline (song) =

Single by Christophe
- Released: 1965
- Recorded: 1965
- Genre: Pop
- Length: 2:47
- Label: Disc'AZ, Motors
- Songwriter: Christophe

Music video
- "Aline" (official live) on YouTube

"Aline" is a single by French singer Christophe. The song became one of the two big hits in France during the summer of 1965 along with "Capri c'est fini" of Hervé Vilard. It sold one million records. The song was produced by the Disc'AZ label. The song is about a man begging his woman to come back and has been described as a "slow, romantic ballad". On 25 September 1965 it reached number one in Belgium's top 10, surpassing "Capri c'est fini" which came in second place, becoming a "substantial hit" in that country according to Billboard magazine. In October 1966 it became the number one hit in Israel. The song was composed by Christophe and arranged by Jacques Dejean. "Aline" was Christophe's favourite song.

== Background ==
Christophe wrote the song while visiting his grandmother for lunch. He did not immediately have a name for the song, but on a visit to the dentist, he asked the assistant what her name was, to which she replied Aline. He so liked the sound that he decided to use it as the name for the new song. "Aline" is the second record by Christophe and his first great success. His first record "Elle s'appelait Sophie" had sold only 27 records. In an interview with Le Point, Christophe chose "Aline" "without hesitation" as his favourite song and "he still sings [it] with the same pleasure for 50 years".

== Lawsuit ==
The song became the target of a lawsuit when a singer by the name of Jacky Moulière sued Christophe alleging plagiarism. Christophe won the lawsuit on appeal in 1970.

== Re-release ==
In 1979, Christophe's career was not going well when his wife Véronique came up with the idea of re-issuing the song. Christophe followed her advice and reissued the song without modifications from the original. The new release became a big hit and just like the original it reached a million records. It then went on to sell a total of 3.5 million records.

== Charts ==
Weekly chart performance for "Aline”
Chart (1965–2020)	Peak position
Belgium (Ultratop 50 Flanders)	1
Belgium (Ultratop 50 Wallonia)	1
France (SNEP)	33
Israel	1
Italy (Musica e dischi)	20
Switzerland (Schweizer Hitparade)	4

== Literature ==
In the novel Lost Luggage by Jordi Puntí which takes place during the student protests in Paris, a man listening to the song on the radio, after learning that his companion is pregnant, suggests to her that if the baby is a girl, she should be given the name "Aline". When the woman asks him what would happen if the baby is a boy, he replied that he would name him "Christophe".

The song is also mentioned in Response: A Contemporary Jewish Review.

== Test song ==
In 1965, due to the great success of the song, it was chosen by Seeburg, a jukebox company, as a test song. The company bought one hundred records and sent them to the United States where they were added to the selection of an equal number of jukeboxes in strategic locations across the country to test consumer demand for French songs of that era. If successful, an additional 50,000 records would be ordered with plans to purchase additional French hits.

== Use in media ==
In October 2017, Volkswagen used the song as the main sound and music background in a television commercial selling cars airing in Toronto, Canada.

The Jarvis Cocker version of the song was used in the trailer for the 2021 film The French Dispatch. An animated music video featuring the film's cast was made directed by Wes Anderson with animations by Javi Aznarez and released by Searchlight Pictures on 22 September of the same year. Cocker's version is featured in Anderson's film and on Cocker's album Chansons d'Ennui Tip-Top (2021).

"Aline" is soundtracked in a 2021 advertisement for Natural Diamonds, featuring Cuban-Spanish actress Ana de Armas.

In the movie from 2022, The Gray Man, the song is in the soundtrack.
