= Ciao! (song) =

1996 single by Lush

Song by Lush featuring Jarvis Cocker

from the album Lovelife
- Released: 5 March 1996
- Genre: Britpop; new wave
- Length: 3:31
- Label: 4AD
- Songwriter(s): Miki Berenyi
- Producer(s): Pete Bartlett; Lush

"Ciao!" is a song by English alternative rock band Lush from their 1996 album, Lovelife. Written as a duet sung from the perspective of a breakup, the song was written by Miki Berenyi with Jarvis Cocker of Pulp making a guest appearance to sing the male vocals.

"Ciao!" was never released as a single, but saw positive critical reception and has been performed live, with one performance featuring Ian Astbury of the Cult as the male vocalist.

== Background ==
"Ciao!" notably features Jarvis Cocker of Pulp dueting with Lush vocalist Miki Berenyi. According to Berenyi, she first met Cocker and Pulp in 1991, when the then-obscure Pulp performed as Lush's support act. Berenyi recalled, "[Pulp] absolutely blew me away and I became a regular at their gigs over the next several years."

Berenyi had written the song as a duet after Lush drummer Chris Acland jokingly asked to sing a song on the new album. Ultimately, Acland declined and Cocker provided guest vocals, possibly because, according to Berenyi, he was amused by the demo of the song, which featured Berenyi singing the male part in a low voice.

Cocker did two takes of the vocals after calming his nerves with brandy, contributing his spoken word part in the song's middle section.

== Release ==
In addition to its release on Lush's 1996 album Lovelife, "Ciao!" was released as a promotional single sent to radio stations. However, the band did not want to appear to be capitalising on the Britpop trend and Cocker's popularity, so they did not release the song as a single (the band instead selected "500" as the album's third single). The song also was the title track to the 2001 compilation Ciao! Best of Lush.

The song was also unpopular with 4AD head Ivo Watts-Russell. Berenyi joked, "Poor Ivo – he still can't believe that this song was on 4AD. Makes him shudder every time I remind him!"

The band have performed the song live, with one performance featuring Ian Astbury of the Cult as the male vocalist. Berenyi recalled, "When we went through it at the soundcheck, it became obvious that Ian had got a bit confused and thought we were going to cover the Cult's "Edie (Ciao Baby)". We're playing the intro and he’s going 'It's quite skiffle, isn't it?'. Chris was laughing so hard he could barely play".

== Reception ==
Consequence of Sound compared Berenyi and Cocker to Nancy Sinatra and Lee Hazlewood on "Ciao!", writing, "This death-of-a-relationship celebration is a potent anti-love song that's especially cathartic for anyone who’s ever needed convincing that they were more over a former flame than they actually were." AllMusic described the song as "irresistible," while the Chicago Tribune called it "amusing."

Berenyi spoke of the song positively, stating that the song made her laugh.
