= Chansons d'Ennui Tip-Top =

Studio album by Jarvis Cocker (as Tip-Top)
- Released: 22 October 2021
- Studio: Jarvis Cocker's home; Narcissus Studios (London)
- Genre: Chanson; French pop
- Length: 43:45
- Language: French
- Label: ABKCO
- Producer: Jarvis Cocker; Jason Buckle

Jarvis Cocker chronology
Beyond the Pale (2020)	Chansons d'Ennui Tip-Top (2021)

Singles from Chansons d'Ennui Tip-Top
- 1. "Aline" Released: 14 September 2021; 2. "Paroles, paroles" Released: 6 October 2021

Chansons d'Ennui Tip-Top (English: Tip-Top Boredom Songs; stylised as CHANSONS d'ENNUI TIP-TOP) is a 2021 studio album by Jarvis Cocker, released on 22 October 2021 by ABKCO Music & Records. It is a covers album, featuring twelve cover versions of French pop songs. It serves as a companion release to the soundtrack for Wes Anderson's 2021 film The French Dispatch. The songs are performed by Cocker in character as Tip-Top, a singer mentioned in the film. The album is often titled simply Chansons d'Ennui and credited to Tip-Top.

== Background and recording ==
"I wanted it to be a kind of sincere love letter to French pop music. I didn’t want it to be in any way kind of a pastiche-type thing. And that also meant that I had to work on my French pronunciation and stuff like that. So that to a French person listening to it, they wouldn't listen and think, 'Oh, that's disrespectful' or 'That just doesn't make sense.'"

—Jarvis Cocker

Chansons d'Ennui Tip-Top features twelve cover versions of French pop songs by artists including Françoise Hardy, Serge Gainsbourg, Brigitte Bardot and Jacques Dutronc. It is a companion release to the soundtrack for Wes Anderson's 2021 film The French Dispatch. Cocker's cover of "Aline" is featured on the film's soundtrack. In the film, Timothée Chalamet's character sits in the café called Les Sans Blague's while listening to Cocker, as Tip-Top, singing "Aline". The project began with the recording of "Aline" at AIR Studios in London, accompanied by Anderson who guided the process. Anderson and his music supervisor Randall Poster suggested Cocker make an album of Tip-Top's greatest hits. Cocker and Anderson decided to collaborate on a full companion album, featuring covers of songs that were originally released during the period that The French Dispatch is set in. It was billed as "a tribute to French pop music and a musical extension of The French Dispatch." Anderson and Poster were also hoping to include a song by the French folk singer Barbara, but Cocker was unable to find a song of hers which he believed he could sing properly. The album was recorded by Jarvis Cocker in character as the fictional popstar character Tip-Top, who he voices in the film. Cocker sings in French, although he has admitted that his "spoken French is pretty atrocious." Lætitia Sadier of Stereolab, who sings on the duet "Paroles, paroles", assisted Cocker's French pronunciation and helped translate "Looking for You" by Nino Ferrer, which was originally sung in English, into the French version that appears the album, titled "Amour, je te cherche". The album is officially Cocker's first solo album in twelve years, however it was recorded with the members of JARV IS..., Cocker's solo band. In 2020, the band were set to tour on their debut album Beyond the Pale. The tour was delayed by the COVID-19 pandemic, and members of the band instead worked on Chansons d'Ennui Tip-Top remotely.

== Music ==
Chansons d'Ennui Tip-Top consists of covers of well-known French pop songs, as well as more obscure selections. It features "dramatic, stylized arrangements" which draw from the original recordings. The album opens with Dalida's "Dans ma chambre", featuring Bach's Toccata and Fugue in D minor organ. The theatrical and space-themed "Contact" was written by Serge Gainsbourg and popularised by Brigitte Bardot. "Paroles, paroles" is a cover of Dalida's 1973 bossa nova-influenced duet with actor Alain Delon. Cocker's duet features Lætitia Sadier and prioritises piano, bass, hand drums, and string arrangements over the original's prevalent guitar. "Requiem pour un con" is cover of Serge Gainsbourg's original from the 1968 film Le Pacha. The "psychedelic" track "Mao Mao" is a cover of a song featured in Jean-Luc Godard's 1967 film La Chinoise. The funk track "Elle et moi" is a rendition of the 1980s new beat song by Max Berlin, with Cocker providing a dramatic reading vocal style inspired by the original. The song also appeared in the 2003 Belgian film Any Way the Wind Blows. The album ends with the lavish and bombastic "Aline", a cover of the hit 1960s ballad by Christophe. Cocker's cover is characterised by its heavy reverb and booming drums, harpsichord, string arrangements and ethereal backing vocals. Cocker employs a "sultry" half-spoken style of singing which progresses into wailing vocals in the chorus.

== Release ==
The album was announced on 14 September 2021, with the first single "Aline" released the same day. An animated music video for "Aline" directed by Wes Anderson was released on 22 September 2021. "Paroles, paroles" was released as the second single on 6 October 2021. Chansons d'Ennui Tip-Top was released by ABKCO Music & Records on 22 October 2021, the same day as The French Dispatch's theatrical release and the release of Alexandre Desplat's original film score. The album is often titled simply Chansons d'Ennui and credited to "Tip-Top".

== Critical reception ==
Professional ratings
Aggregate scores
Source	Rating
Metacritic	79/100
Review scores
Source	Rating
AllMusic	4/5 stars
The Arts Desk	4/5 stars
Clash	8/10
Loud and Quiet	8/10
musicOMH	4/5 stars
NME	3/5 stars
The Scotsman	4/5 stars
Uncut	7/10

Marcy Donelson of AllMusic called the album "Intriguing from beginning to end" and praised Cocker's "lush, emphatic takes." Nick Roseblade of Clash wrote, "Chansons d'Ennui Tip-Top might be the strongest album Cocker has released since his 2006 debut [...] This is an album made with love. Love for the culture of his adopted home, but mostly a love of music in all its forms and styles." Leonie Cooper of NME wrote, "As 'companion' albums go, this is one we're happy to hear long after the credits roll." Piers Martin of Uncut rated the album 7 out of 10, but concluded, "The faithul arrangements deprive the collection of any real edge."

== Track listing ==
No.	Title	Writer(s)	Original performer	Length
1.	"Dans ma chambre"	Pedro Espinoza Prieto	Dalida	3:31
2.	"Contact"	Serge Gainsbourg	Brigitte Bardot	2:55
3.	"La tendresse"	Hubert Yves Adrien Giraud; Noël Roux	Marie Laforêt	2:36
4.	"Amour, je te cherche"	Nino Ferrer	Nino Ferrer and Radiah	5:56
5.	"Les gens sont fous, les temps sont flous"	Jacques Lanzmann; Jacques Dutronc	Jacques Dutronc	3:23
6.	"Il pleut sur la gare"	Areski Belkacem; Brigitte Fontaine	Brigitte Fontaine and Areski Belkacem	3:03
7.	"Paroles, paroles" (featuring Lætitia Sadier)	Matteo Chiosso; Giancarlo Del Re; Gianni Ferrio	Dalida and Alain Delon	4:00
8.	"Requiem pour un con"	Serge Gainsbourg; Michel Jean Piette Colombier	Serge Gainsbourg (in the film Le Pacha)	3:41
9.	"Mon ami la rose"	Cécille Caulier; Jacques Lacome D'Estalenx	Françoise Hardy	2:17
10.	"Mao Mao"	Gérard Guégan; Gérard Hugé	Claude Channes (in the film La Chinoise)	2:41
11.	"Elle et moi"	Pascal Jean Michel Valadon; Aaron Gilbert; Alex Payne; Jean-Pierre Cerrone	Max Berlin	6:11
12.	"Aline"	Daniel Georges Jacq Bevilacqua	Christophe	3:31
Total length:				43:45

== Personnel ==
Credits adapted from liner notes.

Jarv Is

- Jarvis Cocker – vocals; production
- Serafina Steer – harp, keyboards, female lead vocal (9), backing vocals
- Emma Smith – violin, saxophone, keyboards, recorder, backing vocals; string arrangements (1, 3, 4, 9)
- Jason Buckle – guitar, percussion, keyboards; production
- Andrew McKinney – electric bass, double bass, backing vocals
- Adam Betts – drums, percussion, background vocals

Additional personnel

- Lætitia Sadier – vocals (7), keyboards (7), translation (4), French pronunciation coaching
- Bishi Bhattacharya – sitar (2)
- Anna McKinney – vocals (10)
- Joe Auckland – flugelhorn (4)
- Laura Moody – string section (1, 3, 4, 9)
- Flora Curzon – string section (1, 3, 4, 9)
- Morgan Goff – string section (1, 3, 4, 9)
- Lucy Wilkins – string section (1, 3, 4, 9)
- Charlie Stock – string section (1, 3, 4, 9)
- Jennymay Logan – string section (1, 3, 4, 9)
- Philip Granell – string section (1, 3, 4, 9)
- Ian Burdge – string section (1, 3, 4, 9)
- Paloma Deike – string section (1, 3, 4, 9)
- Drew Smith – recording engineering
- Wes Anderson – executive production
- Randall Poster – executive production
- John Davis – mastering, lacquer cutting
- Brian Fitzpatrick – layout, design

== Charts ==
Chart performance for Chansons d'Ennui Tip-Top
Chart (2021)	Peak position
Belgian Albums (Ultratop Wallonia)	130
Scottish Albums (OCC)	51
