= Capri c'est fini =

Single by Hervé Vilard

from the album Capri c'est fini
- B-side: "Un monde fait pour nous"
- Released: June 1965
- Recorded: 1965
- Genre: Pop
- Length: 2:35
- Label: Mercury Records
- Songwriter: Hervé Vilard

Hervé Vilard singles chronology
"Une voix qui t'appelle" (1964)	"Capri c'est fini" (1965)	"J'ai envie (de vivre avec toi)" (1965)

"Capri c'est fini" is the first single of French singer Hervé Vilard. The French song written and sung by him was released on Mercury Records and became a huge French and international hit in the summer of 1965 along with Christophe's hit song Aline, launching Vilard's career and making him instantly famous. The song sold 3.3 million copies. Vilard released 7 language versions of the song. The inspiration came when Vilard saw a promotional travel poster of the Italian island Capri in a Paris Métro station. "C'est fini" comes from a popular song of Charles Aznavour of the same title. The song talks about a break-up of an earlier relationship that had started in Capri.

The Scopitone video was filmed at Château de Chambord and shows its English gardens before they were removed in 1970 and recreated in 2014.

== Releases ==
45 rpm (France)

- A-side: Capri c'est fini (2:35)
- B-side: Un monde fait pour nous (2:14)

EP

- A1: Capri c'est fini (2:35)
- A2: On verra bien (Povera Pianta) (2:28)
- B1: Un monde fait pour nous (Il Mondo) (2:14)
- B2: Jour de chance (2:20)

== Charts ==
Weekly chart performance for "Capri c’est fini”
Chart (1965–66)	Peak position
Belgium (Ultratop 50 Flanders)	2
Belgium (Ultratop 50 Flanders)	2
Netherlands (Single Top 100)	15
West Germany (Media Control)	14

== Covers ==
The song has been subject of many covers. In 1965, Caravelli recorded it in his album J'aime. Caravelli "easy listening" version reappeared on Reader's Digest Music: A New Day Has Come (2007). The French Canadian Serge Laprade as a single also in 1965. In 1980, René Simard recorded the song. In 1994, Ludwig von 88 made a version on the album 17 plombs pour péter les tubes. In 2004, the vocal group Indigo interpreted the song in the album Classixties. A punk version was recorded by Kontingent Furax on the 2004 album Punk Academy. In 2008, Francis et ses peintres in participation with Philippe Katerine made a cover on the album La Paloma.

Language versions include most notably Udo Jürgens in Italian and German keeping the French-language title, the Dutch-language version "Met wie ik hem zie" by Conny Van den Bos in 1966, a much later Dutch version "Parijs was zo mooi" by Doran in 1998 and yet a third Dutch version keeping the title "capri c'est fini" by Freddy Birset in 2002.

The English-language version is entitled "Kiss Tomorrow Goodbye", sung by the British Vince Hill on his album So Nice that appeared in 1967. An American version was sung by Lainie Kazan.

== In popular culture ==
- In 1996, the song was inspiration for an album title of Jeepster
- Also in 1996, it was used in a series of comics written by Patrick Giordano and drawn by Francard and published by Dargaud
- In 1998, the duo Kad et Olivier sang it in their concerts
- In the 2008 French film Astérix aux Jeux olympiques, the film personality Francix Lalannix (played by Francis Lalanne) makes parodies of various known hits, including "Capri c'est fini" which he sings as "Gergovie, c'est fini".
- In a parody show of the popular children show L'École des fans, the French show Les Nuls L'émission a young Odeline Fion sings a parody of "Capri c'est fini". Alain Chabat played the role of the L'École des fans presenter Jacques Martin.
- In 2010, Stephane Guillon made a parody during the television show "Salut les Terriens" on Canal+ singing "Capri, c'est gratuit. Et dire que le billet est à 3000 euros..."
