= Don't Let Him Waste Your Time =

Single by Jarvis Cocker

from the album Jarvis
- Released: 8 January 2007
- Recorded: 2006
- Genre: Alternative rock
- Length: 4:13
- Label: Rough Trade
- Songwriter(s): Jarvis Cocker
- Producer(s): Graham Sutton

Jarvis Cocker singles chronology
"Don't Let Him Waste Your Time" (2007)	"Fat Children" (2007)

"Don't Let Him Waste Your Time" is a song by English singer and songwriter Jarvis Cocker. It was released as a first single from his debut solo album Jarvis on 8 January 2007, reaching number 36 in the UK Singles Chart and number 1 on the UK indie chart.

== Overview ==
Before being recorded for the album Jarvis in November 2006, the song appeared on Nancy Sinatra's self-titled 2004 album, along with "Baby's Coming Back to Me", which also made it onto Jarvis. The song samples the main riff from Dion’s song “Only You Know”.

=== Personnel ===
Richard Hawley plays electric guitar on the track, while Cocker's Pulp bandmate Steve Mackey plays bass. The track also features former Pulp member Antony Genn on backing vocals, and Martin Slattery of The Mescaleros on piano and saxophone.

== Music video ==
The music video, directed by Dougal Wilson, features Jarvis as a singing London taxicab driver. More concerned with singing to the passenger than watching the road, the driver collides with many pedestrians and cyclists.

== Track listings ==
7 inch 1 RTRADS385

1. "Don't Let Him Waste Your Time"
2. "Big Stuff"

7 inch 2 RTRADSX385

1. "Don't Let Him Waste Your Time"
2. "One Man Show"

CD RTRADSCD385

1. "Don't Let Him Waste Your Time"
2. "The Mouse the Bird and the Sausage" (spoken word)
3. "Running the World" (karaoke video)

Digital download

1. "Don't Let Him Waste Your Time"
2. "The Mouse the Bird and the Sausage" (spoken word)
