= Beyond the Pale (Jarv Is album) =

Studio album by Jarv Is
- Released: 17 July 2020
- Recorded: April 2018 – September 2019 (Note: Except piano and bass of "Swanky Modes", recorded at Red Bull (Paris, France) on 5 March 2015.)
- Venue: Peak Cavern (Derbyshire, UK); Primavera Sound (Barcelona, Spain)
- Studio: Narcissus (London, UK)
- Genre: Art rock; space rock; post-punk; wonky pop
- Length: 40:12
- Label: Rough Trade
- Producer: Jarvis Cocker; Jason Buckle

Jarvis Cocker chronology
Room 29 (2017)	Beyond the Pale (2020)	Chansons d'Ennui Tip-Top (2021)

Singles from Beyond the Pale
- 1. "Must I Evolve?" Released: 15 May 2019; 2. "House Music All Night Long" Released: 2 March 2020; 3. "Save the Whale" Released: 11 June 2020

Beyond the Pale is the debut studio album by British rock band Jarv Is, led by Pulp frontman Jarvis Cocker. The studio album incorporates live recordings, and was defined by the group as an "alive album". It was released by Rough Trade Records on 17 July 2020, having been delayed by the COVID-19 pandemic, and received widespread acclaim upon release, with multiple critics characterising it as Cocker's best work since Pulp.

== Background and recording ==
Jarv Is (stylised as JARV IS...) were formed in late 2017, to perform at Sigur Ros' Norður og Niður festival in Iceland. The group was "conceived as a way of writing songs in collaboration with an audience". They began recording their performances to assist their songwriting, until Geoff Barrow suggested the recordings could be used as the foundations of an album.

"Must I Evolve?" and "Sometimes I Am Pharaoh" were recorded during a performance in Peak Cavern, Derbyshire on 7 April 2018, while "Children of the Echo" was recorded during the band's performance at the Primavera Sound festival in Barcelona on 1 June 2019. The rest of the album, including vocals and overdubs for all tracks, was recorded at Narcissus Studios in Neasden, London in June and September 2019, with the exception the piano and bass parts of "Swanky Modes", which had been recorded at Paris' Red Bull Studios on 5 March 2015.

== Release ==
"Must I Evolve?" was released on 15 May 2019, as the band's debut single. On 2 March 2020, the band released "House Music All Night Long", and announced the album on Steve Lamacq's BBC Radio 6 show. It was originally scheduled to be released by Rough Trade Records on 1 May 2020, but was pushed back to 4 September due to the COVID-19 pandemic, before eventually being brought forward to 17 July. In June, the band shared a music video for opening track "Save the Whale".

== Critical reception ==
Professional ratings
Aggregate scores
Source	Rating
AnyDecentMusic?	8.0/10
Metacritic	86/100
Review scores
Source	Rating
AllMusic	4/5 stars
The Daily Telegraph	5/5 stars
DIY	4.5/5 stars
Exclaim!	7/10
NME	4/5 stars
The Observer	4/5 stars
Pitchfork	6.7/10
Q	5/5 stars
Uncut	9/10
Under the Radar	7.5/10

Beyond the Pale received widespread acclaim from music critics. At Metacritic, which assigns a normalised rating out of 100 to reviews from mainstream publications, the album received a score of 86, based on 15 critics, signifying "universal acclaim". For The Daily Telegraph, Neil McCormick described the album as Cocker's "resounding comeback", writing that it is "the best thing [he] has done since Pulp, and that is very good indeed". Tom Pinnock for Uncut and Andrew Trendell for NME similarly suggested that the album is Cocker's best since Pulp's This is Hardcore (1998). Reviewing the album for DIY, Lisa Wright praised the album for standing on its own, writing, "It would be easy, given his illustrious catalogue, to judge Jarvis Cocker against his past, but that would unfair to what Jarv Is have achieved together". In his review for AllMusic, editor Stephen Thomas Erlewine compared the album favourably to Pulp's early work, such as Separations (1992), describing it as "something of a quiet renaissance for [Cocker], proof that he can still weave a compelling, daring blend of trash and high art". Ryan Leas of Stereogum characterised it as "a haggard and meditative late-career album", praising Cocker's lyrics and maturation, and writing, "It’s heartening to hear Cocker singing something adjacent to pop music again". For The Observer, Kitty Empire wrote, "This is a great record: the first utterance, hopefully, of a new set of echoes".

In a more mixed review, Exclaim!'s Alex Whetham praised Cocker's lyrics but found the album's music to be inconsistent. Ben Cardew of Pitchfork similarly praised Cocker's songwriting, but criticised the album's lack of cohesion, writing, "The hybrid stage/studio setup captures the sprawl of a live gig without the excitement and possibility, and the sheen of a studio recording without the cohesion and refinement".

== Track listing ==
Beyond the Pale track listing
No.	Title	Writer(s)	Length
1.	"Save the Whale"	Jarvis Cocker; Serafina Steer; Jason Buckle; Emma Smith; Andrew McKinney; Adam Betts	4:30
2.	"Must I Evolve?"	Cocker; Steer	6:41
3.	"Am I Missing Something?"	Cocker; Buckle; Steer; Steve Mackey	6:46
4.	"House Music All Night Long"	Cocker; Steer; Chris Vatalaro	5:53
5.	"Sometimes I Am Pharaoh"	Cocker; Steer; Mackey	5:18
6.	"Swanky Modes"	Cocker; Jason Domnarski; Smith; Steer	4:36
7.	"Children of the Echo"	Cocker; Steer; Buckle	6:32
Total length:			40:12

Bonus CD
No.	Title	Length
1.	"Suite for Ian & Jane" (composed for the filmmakers Iain Forsyth and Jane Pollard for the television series Likely Stories, and "The Dali & The Cooper", an episode of the television series Urban Myths)	25:24

== Personnel ==
Jarv Is

- Jarvis Cocker – vocals (all tracks), Vox Starstreamer guitar (1, 2, 7), synthesiser (1, 4), Spanish guitar (2), atonal percussion (2), synth loop (2), Mellotron (2), handclaps (2, 7), Gibson Les Paul (3), Marine Rider guitar (3), acoustic guitar (3, 7), whistling (3), microKORG preset (4), piano (4), Boss Voice Transformer (5), Philicorda organ (5), Korg MS-20 synthesiser (5), bass (first half of 6), kalimba (7)
- Serafina Steer – miniKORG (1, 4), backing vocals (all tracks), microKORG preset (2), Philicorda organ (2), handclaps (2), harp (3, 5, 7), Elka Rhapsody (4), piano (4), Wurlitzer electric piano (5, 7)
- Emma Smith – violin (1–6), backing vocals (1–4, 6, 7), handclaps (2), saxophone (5, 7), Vox Starstreamer guitar (7)
- Jason Buckle – synthesiser (1, 2), 808 programming (1, 4, 5), cabasa (2, 6), tambourine (2), handclaps (2), Wasp synthesiser (3–7), programmed drums (3), wah-wah guitar (4), bass synth (5), Syncussion (6), Echoplex (7), Philicorda organ (7), electronic percussion (7)
- Andrew McKinney – bass (1–4, second half of 6, 7), Fender Bass VI (2), backing vocals (2, 3), handclaps (2), Moog Taurus pedals (5)
- Adam Betts – drums (all tracks), percussion (1, 4), backing vocals (3), tongue plate percussion (5), electronic percussion (7)

Additional musicians

- Chris Vatalaro – prepared piano (2), handclaps (2)
- Naala – backing vocals (3, 4, 6)
- Eoban and Cedric Tomlin – backing vocals (3)
- Steve Mackey – programmed strings (3), original drum sample (5)
- Jason Domnarski – piano (6)

Technical

- Andy Pink – live recordings
- Drew Smith – overdubs and vocals recording
- Craig Silvey – mixing
- Max Prior – mixing assistance
- Dani Spragg – mixing assistance
- Kevin Metcalfe – mastering
- Thibault Dargeou – recording (piano and bass on 6)

Artwork

- Dave Bunnell – cave photograph
- Eddie Whelan – band photograph
- Graeme Swinton (at Actually) – sleeve design

== Charts ==
Chart performance for Beyond the Pale
Chart (2020)	Peak position
Austrian Albums (Ö3 Austria)	28
French Albums (SNEP)	136
German Albums (Offizielle Top 100)	85
Scottish Albums (OCC)	6
Spanish Albums (PROMUSICAE)	99
Swiss Albums (Schweizer Hitparade)	55
UK Albums (OCC)	11
