= Lovelife (album) =

Studio album by Lush
- Released: 18 March 1996
- Studios: Protocol, London
- Genre: Britpop
- Length: 45:52
- Label: 4AD
- Producers: Pete Bartlett; Lush

Lush chronology
Split (1994)	Lovelife (1996)	Ciao! Best of Lush (2001)

Singles from Lovelife
- 1. "Single Girl" Released: 8 January 1996; 2. "Ladykillers" Released: 26 February 1996; 3. "500 (Shake Baby Shake)" Released: 15 July 1996

Lovelife is the third and final studio album by English rock band Lush. It was released on 18 March 1996 by 4AD. On Lovelife, the band moved away from their earlier dream pop and shoegaze style and embraced a more Britpop-oriented sound. The album was produced by Pete Bartlett and the band at Protocol Studios in London, and engineered by Giles Hall. Three songs were released as singles: "Single Girl", "Ladykillers", and "500 (Shake Baby Shake)", all of which achieved moderate success on the UK Singles Chart, reaching the top 30 positions. On release, Lovelife reached number eight on the UK Albums Chart.

== Background ==
Jarvis Cocker of Pulp dueted with Lush vocalist Miki Berenyi on the song "Ciao!"—Berenyi had written the song as a duet after Lush drummer Chris Acland jokingly asked to sing a song on the new album. Ultimately, Acland declined and Cocker provided guest vocals.

In 2017, Berenyi revealed via Twitter that the lyrics to the track "Heavenly Nobodies" was about her and a friend's star-struck encounter with Hole frontwoman Courtney Love. She also added that the song was not intended as a dig towards her, and that the riff was inspired by the Monkees and the Kinks.

"Single Girl" proved to be one of the band's largest hits, though the band's discomfort with the more commercial sound of the song almost led to its shelving. Berenyi recalled, "Pete [Bartlett] knew 'Single Girl' was a single right off the bat but says: 'You and Emma seemed almost embarrassed by the idea of commercial success and Emma kept trying to dismiss it as a B-side'…" The video for the song also featured actors from Four Weddings and a Funeral.

"500" was written by Anderson about the Fiat 500, since she had just passed her driver's exam during the writing of the album.

== Reception ==
Professional ratings
Review scores
Source	Rating
AllMusic	4.5/5 stars
Chicago Tribune	3/4 stars
Entertainment Weekly	B+
The Guardian	4/5 stars
Los Angeles Times	3/4 stars
NME	7/10
Pitchfork	5.8/10
Q	3/5 stars
Select	3/5
Vox	5/10

In 2017, Pitchfork placed Lovelife at number 19 on its list of "The 50 Best Britpop Albums".

== Track listing ==
No.	Title	Writer(s)	Length
1.	"Ladykillers"	Miki Berenyi	3:13
2.	"Heavenly Nobodies"	Berenyi	2:59
3.	"500 (Shake Baby Shake)"	Emma Anderson	3:30
4.	"I've Been Here Before"	Anderson	4:36
5.	"Papasan"	Berenyi	2:36
6.	"Single Girl"	Anderson	2:35
7.	"Ciao!" (featuring Jarvis Cocker)	Berenyi	3:31
8.	"Tralala"	Anderson	5:35
9.	"Last Night"	Anderson	5:24
10.	"Runaway"	Berenyi	3:36
11.	"The Childcatcher"	Berenyi	3:17
12.	"Olympia"	Anderson	5:04

== Release history ==
Country	Date	Label	Format	Catalogue #
United States	5 March 1996	4AD/Reprise	CD	9 46170-2
United Kingdom	18 March 1996	4AD	CD	CAD 6004 CD
United Kingdom	18 March 1996	4AD	LP (clear-coloured)	CAD 6004
Japan	20 March 1996	Nippon Columbia	CD/bonus 3" CD	COZY-27/28

== Singles ==
- "Single Girl" (8 January 1996)
  - CD1 (BAD 6001 CD)
    1. "Single Girl" – 2:36
    2. "Tinkerbell" – 3:06
    3. "Outside World" – 4:05
    4. "Cul de Sac" – 3:39
  - CD2 (BAD D 6001 CD)
    1. "Single Girl" – 2:36
    2. "Pudding" – 3:56
    3. "Demystification" (Zounds cover) – 3:39
    4. "Shut Up" – 3:46
  - 7" vinyl (clear-coloured; AD 6001)
    1. "Single Girl" – 2:36
    2. "Sweetie" – 2:39
- "Ladykillers" (26 February 1996)
  - CD1 (BAD 6002 CD)
    1. "Ladykillers" – 3:14
    2. "Matador" – 3:01
    3. "Ex" – 3:14
    4. "Dear Me (Miki's 8-Track Home Demo)" – 3:06
  - CD2 (BAD D 6002 CD)
    1. "Ladykillers" – 3:14
    2. "Heavenly" – 2:53
    3. "Carmen" – 3:19
    4. "Plums and Oranges" – 6:19
  - 7" vinyl (green-coloured; AD 6002)
    1. "Ladykillers" – 3:14
    2. "I Wanna Be Your Girlfriend" – 3:19 (The Rubinoos cover)
- "500 (Shake Baby Shake)" (15 July 1996)
  - CD1 (BAD 6009 CD)
    1. "500 (Shake Baby Shake) (Single Remix)" – 3:22
    2. "I Have the Moon" – 3:52
    3. "Piledriver" – 3:07
    4. "Olympia (Acoustic Version)" – 3:16
  - CD2 (BAD D 6009 CD)
    1. "500 (Shake Baby Shake) (Single Remix)" – 3:22
    2. "I'd Like to Walk Around in Your Mind" – 2:19 (Vashti Bunyan cover)
    3. "Kiss Chase (Acoustic Version)" – 2:54
    4. "Last Night (Hexadecimal Dub Mix)" – 6:31
  - 7" vinyl (red-coloured; AD 6009)
    1. "500 (Shake Baby Shake) (Single Remix)" – 3:22
    2. "I Have the Moon" – 3:52
- "Last Night" (PROMO ONLY, January 1996)
  - Radio promo CD (PRO-CD-8034)
    1. "Last Night (Latent Power Mix)" – 5:25
    2. "Undertow (Spooky Remix)" – 9:13
    3. "Last Night (Darkest Hour Mix)" – 4:58
    4. "Lovelife (Suga Bullit Remix)" – 8:17
    5. "Last Night (Hexadecimal Dub Mix)" – 6:31
    6. "Ladykillers (Demo – Ruff Mix '95)" – 3:12

== Personnel ==
Personnel credits adapted from the album's liner notes.

Lush

- Miki Berenyi – lead vocals, guitar; handclaps (1), melody horn (7)
- Emma Anderson – guitars, vocals; handclaps (1), melody horn (7)
- Phil King – bass guitar; spoken vocals (9, 11)
- Chris Acland – drums

Additional musicians

- Pete Bartlett – handclaps (1), drip sounds (5), piano (8), additional guitars
- Jarvis Cocker – vocals (7)
- Sue Dench – viola (4, 8, 9, 12)
- Terry Edwards – trumpet (4, 12)
- Dan Goodwin – percussion
- Kate Holmes – flute (12)
- Mike Kearsey – trombone (4, 12)
- Liam Molloy – handclaps (1)
- Leo Payne – violin (4, 8, 9, 12)
- Audrey Riley – cello, string arrangements (4, 8, 9, 12)
- Melissa Thompson – spoken vocals (9)
- Chris Tombling – violin (4, 8, 9, 12)

Technical

- Pete Bartlett – production
- Giles Hall – engineering
- Paul Q. Kolderie – mixing (1–8, 10–12)
- Bob Ludwig – mastering
- Lush – production
- Liam Molloy – engineering assistance
- Steve Osborne – mixing (9)
- Sean Slade – mixing (1–8, 10–12)

== Charts ==
Chart performance for Lovelife
Chart (1996)	Peak position
Australian Albums (ARIA)	100
Canada Top Albums/CDs (RPM)	61
Scottish Albums (Official Charts)	27
Swedish Albums (Sverigetopplistan)	41
UK Albums (Official Charts)	8
UK Independent Albums (OCC)	2
US Billboard 200	189
US Heatseekers Albums (Billboard)	11
