= Joy of Living: A Tribute to Ewan MacColl =

Compilation album by various artists
- Released: September 18, 2015
- Label: Compass

Joy of Living: A Tribute to Ewan MacColl is a compilation and tribute album to Ewan MacColl by various artists, released by Cooking Vinyl Records in the UK and Compass Records in the USA on September 18, 2015. The album was assembled and produced by MacColl's sons Calum and Neill.
