= Jarvis (album) =

Studio album by Jarvis Cocker
- Released: 13 November 2006
- Studios: Yellow Arch, Sheffield; K.P.I., Sheffield; Les Studios de la Seine, Paris; Angel, London (strings)
- Genre: Alternative rock
- Length: 46:54
- Label: Rough Trade
- Producers: Graham Sutton; Jarvis Cocker

Jarvis Cocker chronology
Jarvis (2006)	Further Complications (2009)

Singles from Jarvis
- 1. "Don't Let Him Waste Your Time" Released: 8 January 2007; 2. "Fat Children" Released: 16 July 2007

Jarvis (also known as The Jarvis Cocker Record) is the debut solo album by Pulp vocalist and musician Jarvis Cocker, released in the UK on 13 November 2006.

== Overview ==
Two songs from the album, "Don't Let Him Waste Your Time" and "Baby's Coming Back to Me", were previously released on Nancy Sinatra's self-titled 2004 album.

The complete version of the song "The Loss Adjuster" appeared as b-side to "Fat Children" single.

Steve Mackey and Mark Webber, fellow band members from Pulp play on this record. Antony Genn, a former Pulp member, and Richard Hawley, who toured and performed, also play on the album. Candida Doyle has played on various tracks when performed live.

The song "Running the World" can be heard during the closing credits of the film Children of Men.

== Reception ==
Professional ratings
Aggregate scores
Source	Rating
Metacritic	82/100
Review scores
Source	Rating
AllMusic	4/5 stars
The A.V. Club	B+
Drowned in Sound	8/10
The Guardian	5/5 stars
MusicOMH	5/5 stars
NME	7/10
The Observer	5/5 stars
Pitchfork	6.2/10
Rolling Stone	4/5 stars
Stylus Magazine	B

Initial critical response to Jarvis was very positive. At Metacritic, which assigns a normalised rating out of 100 to reviews from mainstream critics, the album has received an average score of 82, based on 30 reviews.

== "Running the World" 2019 chart entry ==
On the record the final track "Quantum Theory" contains a hidden track: "(Cunts Are Still) Running the World". After a public campaign to make the song "Running the World" the UK Christmas 2019 No. 1, the song entered the official UK singles chart at No. 48 and entered The Official Big Top 40 at No. 3.

== Track listing ==
All tracks written by Jarvis Cocker, except for "Black Magic" by Cocker and Steve Mackey.

Original disc release:

1. "The Loss Adjuster (Excerpt 1)" – 0:29
2. "Don't Let Him Waste Your Time" – 4:09
3. "Black Magic" – 4:21
4. "Heavy Weather" – 3:49
5. "I Will Kill Again" – 3:45
6. "Baby's Coming Back to Me" – 4:09
7. "Fat Children" – 3:23
8. "From Auschwitz to Ipswich" – 3:49
9. "Disney Time" – 3:04
10. "Tonite" – 3:56
11. "Big Julie" – 4:41
12. "The Loss Adjuster (Excerpt 2)" – 0:29
13. "Quantum Theory" – 4:38

== Personnel ==
Personnel adapted from Jarvis liner notes.

Band

- Jarvis Cocker – lead vocal (tracks 2–11, 13), backing vocals (tracks 2–4, 7–10, 13), piano (tracks 1, 5, 9, 11, 12), acoustic guitar (tracks 2, 4, 6, 10, 13), electric guitar (tracks 2, 3, 8), Roland SH-1000 (tracks 3, 8), Solina String Ensemble (tracks 7, 8), synth brass (track 2), tubular bells (track 3), band bells (track 3), tremolo guitar (track 4), Hammond organ (track 4), Mellotron flute (track 5), Memorymoog (track 5), glockenspiel (track 6), Del Rey guitar (track 7), Clavioline (track 7), six-string bass (track 7), vibraphone (track 8), Roland Vocoder Plus (track 13)
- Richard Hawley – electric guitar (tracks 2, 3, 8, 10), guitar (tracks 1, 12), Hawaiian guitar (tracks 10, 11), lap steel guitar (track 2), electric twelve-string guitar (track 4), piano (track 6), vibraphone (track 6), brushes (track 6), acoustic guitar (track 6), harmony vocal (track 6), Hoover guitar (track 7), baritone guitar (track 9), ring guitar (track 9), enchanted lyre (track 11), celeste (track 11)
- Steve Mackey – bass (tracks 1–4, 7–11), electric vibraphone (track 6), acoustic guitar (track 6)
- Ross Orton – drums (tracks 2–4, 7–11), timpani (tracks 3, 9), guitar case (track 6), egg (track 6), acoustic guitar (track 6)

Additional musicians

- Martin Slattery – piano (track 2), saxophone (track 2)
- Antony Genn – harmony vocal (track 2)
- Alasdair Malloy – percussion (tracks 2–4, 10), band bells (track 3), rainmaker (track 4), marimba (track 6), conga (track 6), percussion and tuned percussion arrangement (track 6), glockenspiel (track 10)
- Graham Sutton – additional keyboards (track 2), string arrangement (tracks 11, 13)
- Jason Buckle – Wasp synthesiser (track 3), cruise liner keyboard (track 10)
- Richard B Humphries – storm recording (track 4)
- Philip Sheppard – string arrangement (tracks 5, 10, 11, 13), choral arrangement (tracks 5, 10)

Technical

- Graham Sutton – mixing (at Miloco Studios and The Strongroom Studios, London), engineering
- Robbie Nelson – engineering
- Colin Elliot – assistant engineering (at Yellow Arch)
- Liam Walsh – assistant engineering (at Yellow Arch)
- Mike Timm – assistant engineering (at K.P.I.)
- Sebastian Gohier – assistant engineering (at Les Studios de la Seine)
- Mat Bartram – assistant engineering (at Angel)
- Adrian Breakspear – assistant engineering (at Miloco)
- Mark Bishop – assistant engineering (at Miloco)
- Joe Hirst – assistant engineering (at Miloco)
- Lee Slater – assistant engineering (at The Strongroom)
- Neil Comber – assistant engineering (at The Strongroom)
- Simon Hayes – assistant engineering (at Mayfair)
- Andrew Rugg – assistant engineering (at Mayfair)
- Tim Young – mastering (at Metropolis)
- Phill Brown – engineering (string and choral sessions)

Choir

- Rob Johnston
- Emma Brain-Gabbott
- Julia Doyle
- Ildiko Allen
- Alexandra Gibson
- Andrew Busher
- Emer McParland
- Margaret Cameron

Strings

- Martin Burgess – violin
- Harriet Davies – violin
- Harvey De Souza – violin
- Takane Funatsu – violin
- Jo Godden – violin
- Janice Graham – violin
- David Juritz – violin
- Julian Leaper – violin
- Steve Morris – violin
- Celia Sheen – violin
- Amanda Smith – violin
- Simon Smith – violin
- Julian Tear – violin
- Catherine Bradshaw – viola
- Jane Atkins – viola
- William Hawkes – viola
- Richard Nelson – viola
- Bob Smissen – viola
- Adrian Bradbury – cello
- David Cohen – cello
- Stephen Orton – cello
- Jonathan Williams – cello
- Chris Laurence – double bass
- Stephen Mair – double bass

Design

- The Designers Republic – design
- Jarvis Cocker – design
- Serge Leblon – photography

== Charts ==
=== Weekly charts ===
Chart (2006)	Peak position
UK Albums (Official Charts)	37
UK Independent Albums (Official Charts)	1
