= Monsieur Gainsbourg Revisited =

Compilation album by Various artists
- Released: 2006
- Label: Virgin Records (UK); Verve Forecast Records (US)

Monsieur Gainsbourg Revisited is a tribute album to the works of late French singer/songwriter Serge Gainsbourg. First released on Virgin Records in 2006, it consists of English language cover versions of Gainsbourg songs, performed by a diverse array of contemporary artists. Gainsbourg's former wife, Jane Birkin, sang on one track.

The album charted in France (#8), Switzerland (#23) and Belgium (#6 Wa, #29 Vl).

== Track listing ==
1. "A Song for Sorry Angel" – Franz Ferdinand & Jane Birkin
2. "I Love You (Me Either)" ("Je t'aime... moi non plus") – Cat Power & Karen Elson
3. "I Just Came to Tell You That I'm Going" ("Je suis venu te dire que je m'en vais") – Jarvis Cocker & Kid Loco
4. "Requiem for Anna" – Portishead
5. "Requiem for a Jerk" ("Requiem pour un con") – Faultline, Brian Molko & Françoise Hardy
6. "L'Hôtel" – Michael Stipe
7. "Au Revoir Emmanuelle" – Tricky
8. "Lola R. for Ever" – Marianne Faithfull & Sly and Robbie
9. "Boomerang 2005" – Gonzales, Feist & Dani
10. "Boy Toy" – Marc Almond and Trash Palace
11. "The Ballad of Melody Nelson" – Placebo
12. "Just a Man with a Job" – The Rakes
13. "I Call It Art" – The Kills
14. "Those Little Things" – Carla Bruni

American edition bonus tracks

15. "The Ballad of Bonnie and Clyde" – James Iha & Kazu Makino
16. "Angels Fall" – Nina Persson & Nathan Larson

The 2020 re-issue of the compilation added "The Lollies" covered by Keith Flint, but removed the James Iha & Kazu Makino cover, as well as the Placebo cover in some formats.

== Sources ==
- monsieurgainsbourg.com
