= Hervé Vilard =

French pop–singer (born 1946)

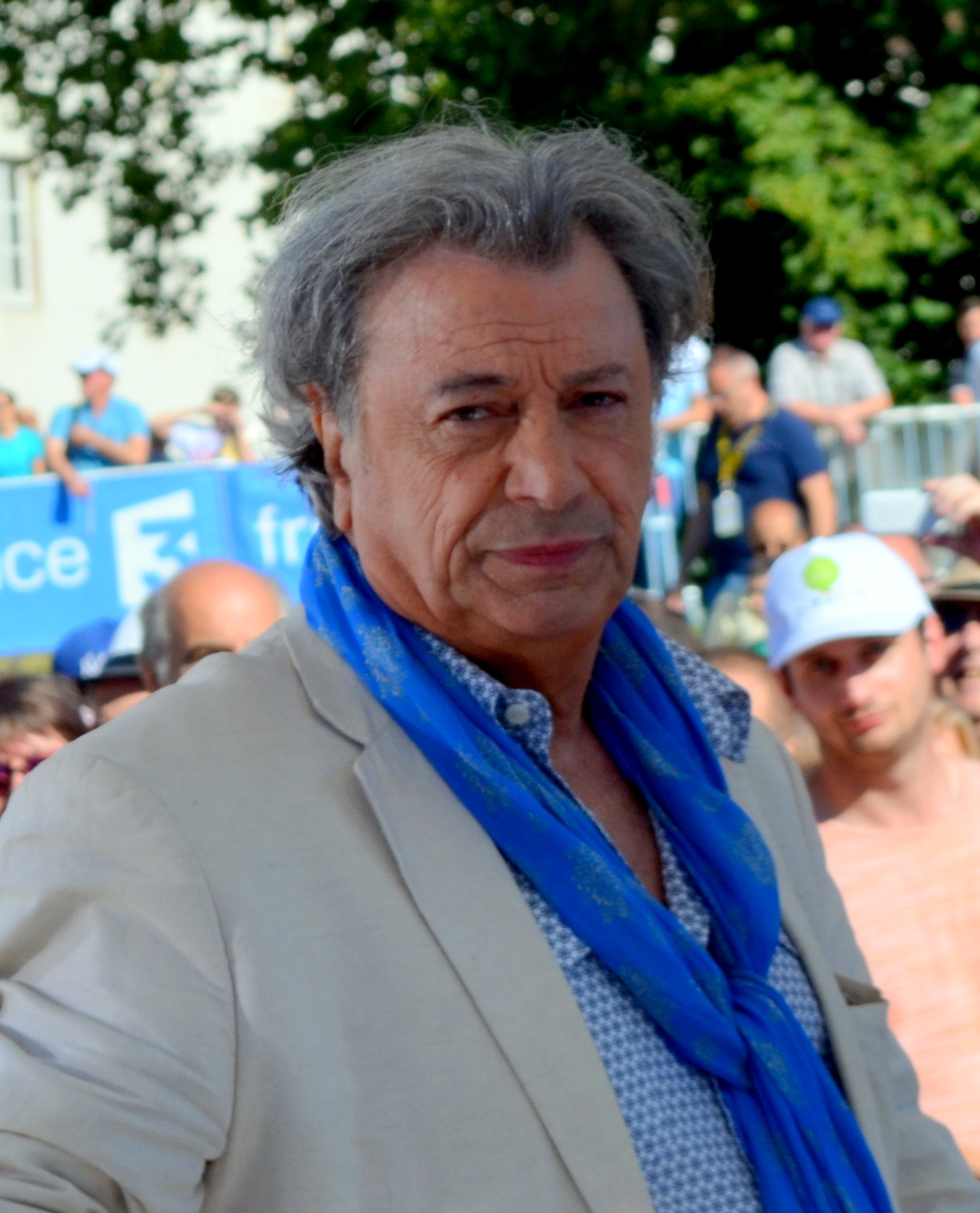
- Vilard in Bourg-en-Bresse, 2016

Background information
- Born: René Vilard; 24 July 1946 (age 80)
- Origin: Paris, France
- Genre: Pop
- Occupation: Singer
- Years active: 1965–present
- Website: herve-vilard.fr

Hervé Vilard (born René Vilard; 24 July 1946 in Paris, France) is a French pop singer, who first became famous in the 1960s. His first single "Capri c'est fini" became an international hit in 1965 and rendered him instantaneously famous. The song sold 3.3 million copies. "Nous" (1979), "Reviens" (1981) and "Méditerranéenne" (1983) are among his other big hits. He is famous in Latin America, as he settled there between 1969 and 1978, singing in Spanish.

His long national and international musical career as a singer, songwriter and stage performer spans four decades. In 1992, in recognition of his contributions to French culture, he was awarded the Ordre national du Mérite in a ceremony at the Parisian Théâtre des Variétés hosted by Jean-Paul Belmondo.

== Early life ==
René Vilard was born 24 July 1946 in a taxi which was transferring his mother Blanche to the Saint-Antoine hospital in Paris to deliver. Soon after his birth, his father had left home therefore Vilard never met his father. His mother eventually lost custody of her children and young René was sent to an orphanage in Paris. Later he was transferred to the Berry region of France into the custody of various foster homes. Young René became a runaway during that period of his life. Eventually he was moved to the Cher region of France where he met a priest, Father Angrand, who became his mentor and taught him literature and music. In 1991, Vilard bought the monastery at La Celette, where he met Father Angrand and made it his home.

== Success in Paris ==
Eventually young René left La Celette for Paris where he met Daniel Cordier, a former member of the French Resistance and Art dealer who later adopted him in 1962. This enabled teenager Vilard to finally remove himself from the state child care system. He started working at various places in Paris including a record store at Champs-Élysées. René wanted to further cultivate his musical talents and started taking singing lessons. During this time he was discovered by an executive working for Mercury Records. The meeting with the executive from Mercury Records led to a meteoric rise in his musical career. His first single Capri c'est fini was released in June 1965 under the Mercury label and instantly became a hit both in France and abroad selling 3.3 million copies and making Hervé Vilard a household name overnight. Capri c'est fini was co-written with Marcel Hurten, and has been described as "eternal" and "written with intensity by Vilard".

Following the success of Capri c'est fini, French newsmagazine France Dimanche offered the singer a deal under which the magazine would help him find his mother. In return, Hervé Vilard gave the magazine exclusive rights to the interviews and the press coverage that would follow a successful reunion. After Vilard accepted the offer, France Dimanche launched a publicity campaign which eventually resulted in Vilard reuniting with his mother. At the same time, the sales of France Dimanche increased substantially. His mother died in 1981.

Building on the success of Capri c'est fini Vilard released two more hits Mourir ou vivre and Fais-la rire which establish him as a successful artist. In 1966, he became the opening act for Claude François, with whom he later went on a European and world tour. After some time, disagreements arose between Vilard and François and their co-operation ended.

== International success ==
From 1967 to 1969, he embarked on a tour of South America where he met with success. He went back to France between 1969 and 1970 and subsequently left again to take up residence in Buenos Aires until his successful comeback to France in 1978. He met with great success in Latin America, including Mexico where he was under a contract. Beyond Latin America, his records become hits in Korea, Turkey, and Japan. He also played to sold-out concerts at the Palais des Sports in Oran, Algeria in 1966.

== France ==
In 1978, his single Nous became a hit in France, selling 2 million records. On 31 December 1979, he appeared for the first time at L'Olympia where he starred in a variety show which became very successful. In the summer of 1980 his hit single Reviens sold 1 million copies. During this period, he combined his studio work with tours across France, and in 1984, 1985 and 1987, he produced the hit albums Ensemble, Les Chansons que j'aime and P'tit brun, forming a chain of 1980s album hits. His tours also included performances for charity and appearances at orphanages.

In the early 1990s, Vilard produced L'Amour défendu and also appeared at the L'Olympia again. In 1992, he received the Ordre national du Mérite in a special ceremony at the Parisian Théâtre des Variétés hosted by Jean-Paul Belmondo.

In 2004, the Berry region honoured Villard by officially naming a performing arts building after him. The same year his compilation CD Cri du coeur, which includes lyrics from the works of Marguerite Duras, Aragon, Brecht, Pablo Neruda and other writers and poets, marked a departure from his usual entertainment-oriented style and gave him wide recognition among France's literati.

He declared, in Paris Match magazine that same year, that he noticed former Nazi officer Klaus Barbie had attended one of his concerts in Bolivia, that helped arrest him to deport him to France for trial.

In 2006, he wrote an autobiography L'âme seule, followed a year later by Le Bal des papillons, recounting in both books his experiences from humble origins to stardom and the relationship he developed with his mother after he found her.

== Personal life ==
In 1967, Vilard was also the first well-known French singer to come out as gay and did so on the radio. He has been admitted to hospital due to his cholesteatoma of the middle ear.

== Discography ==
- Capri c'est fini (1965)
- Fais la rire (1969)
- Champagne (1976)
- Rêveries (1977)
- Nous (1977)
- Je l'aime tant (1981)
- Ensemble (1983)
- Le Vin de Corse (1986)
- Tout simplement (1997)
- L'Amour défendu (1990)
- Simplement (2002)
- Cri du cœur (2004)

== Publications ==
- L'âme seule Author Hervé Vilard Publisher Libra Diffusio, 2007 ISBN 2-84492-267-8, ISBN 978-2-84492-267-0 Length 325 pages
- Le bal des papillons Author Hervé Vilard Publisher LGF/Le Livre de Poche, 2009 ISBN 2-253-12590-3, ISBN 978-2-253-12590-7 Length 310 pages
