= Serafina Steer =

English harpist, pianist, singer and songwriter

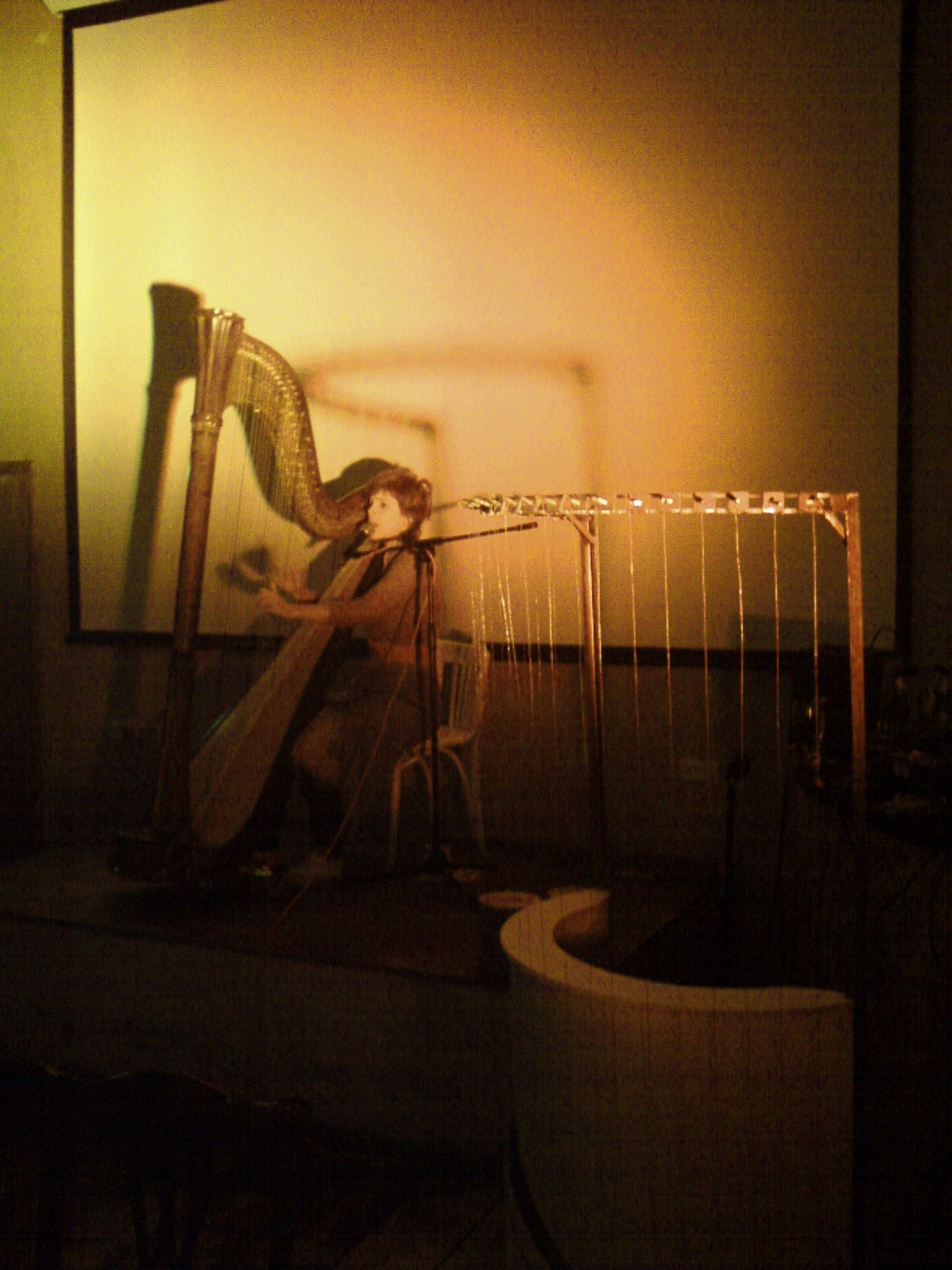
- Serafina performing at Corbet Place, 2006.

Background information
- Born: 30 April 1982 (age 44); London, England
- Occupation: Harpist/ songwriter/ composer/ band leader/ teacher
- Instruments: Harp, keyboard
- Labels: current: Fire Records previous: Static Caravan; Lost Map Records; Stolen Recordings

Serafina Steer (born 30 April 1982) is an English harpist, and songwriter based in London. She is best known as a regular collaborator with Jarvis Cocker. In addition to harp, she plays keyboards, bass guitar and has composed for theatre and TV.

Steer has released various solo and collaborative albums with The Moths Are Real, produced by Cocker, garnering critical acclaim. She writes for all-female post punk ensemble Bas Jan (Fire Records UK) who have released 3 albums. She was a member of Jarvis Cocker's band Jarv Is (2017-2022), during which time she co-composed the soundtrack for This Is Going To Hurt, a BBC/AMC adaptation of the book by Adam Kay.

== Career ==
Serafina Steer studied harp with Imogen Barford at Morley College, Eira Lynn Jones at Chetham's School of Music and at Trinity College of Music with Gabriella Dall'Olio.

In 2007 Steer released a 7" single and an album entitled Cheap Demo Bad Science on Static Caravan Recordings. Recorded with Mike Lindsay of folktronica band Tunng, and Kristian Craig Robinson, aka Capitol K, the album opens with a cover version of Brian Eno's "By This River" but all other songs are her own.

In 2010 she released Change is Good, Change is Good, again on Static Caravan. It was described by Jarvis Cocker as one of his favourite albums of the year and well "worth a listen". Recording was interrupted when Steer's harp was stolen from her car. Benge made his collection of analogue synthesizers available to fill in the harp parts. Patrick Wolf described the album in The Observer as if "Stereolab and Shirley Collins made an album together about the trials of 21st-century romance."

The 2013 album The Moths Are Real, on Stolen Recordings, was produced by Jarvis Cocker, with the pair beginning a long-running working relationship. The album featured an illustrious array of musicians including Steve Mackey, Seb Rochford, David Cunningham, Leo Chadburn with string arrangements by John Purton of The Manchester String Quartet.

In 2017 was she awarded a Paul Hamlyn composer award.

In 2019, she self released a tape of mainly instrumental compositions called The Mind Is A Trap, followed in 2024 by Drinking From The Pools Of Night EP released on Fire Records.

=== Collaborations ===
In 2015 she formed an all female post punk trio Bas Jan, whose first gigs were supporting The Decemberists on their 2015 UK and European dates. Steer featured on vocals, bass guitar and keyboards, composing the majority of the band's material. Their first album Yes I Jan, produced by Leo Abrahams and Leafcutter John was released on Lost Map Records in 2018. The band had expanded and undergone a complete line up change by 2022's 'Baby U Know' (Lost Map). This album, recorded in lock down at Cafe Oto caused them to be signed by Fire Records with whom they went on to release Back To The Swamp in 2023.

Frequent working collaborations with Jarvis Cocker since working together on The Moths Are Real evolved into the improvisational band project Jarv Is. Their first album Beyond The Pale, featured writing credits from Steer in particular on their lead single tracks "House Music All Night Long" and "Must I Evolve?".

Between 2010-11 Steer joined John Foxx and the Maths alongside Hannah Peel and Benge playing analogue synthesizers and bass guitar. In 2012 she appeared in the London Sinfonietta's New Music Show 3.

For the 2011 Branchage Film Festival, Jersey and PRS Women Make Music commissioned Steer to compose a live soundtrack to a film of her choosing. This resulted in Postman's Familiar, a psychedelic harp and stop-motion animation (by Sam Steer, brother) response to Kenneth Anger's Rabbit's Moon which was also performed at Glasgow and London Short Film Festivals.

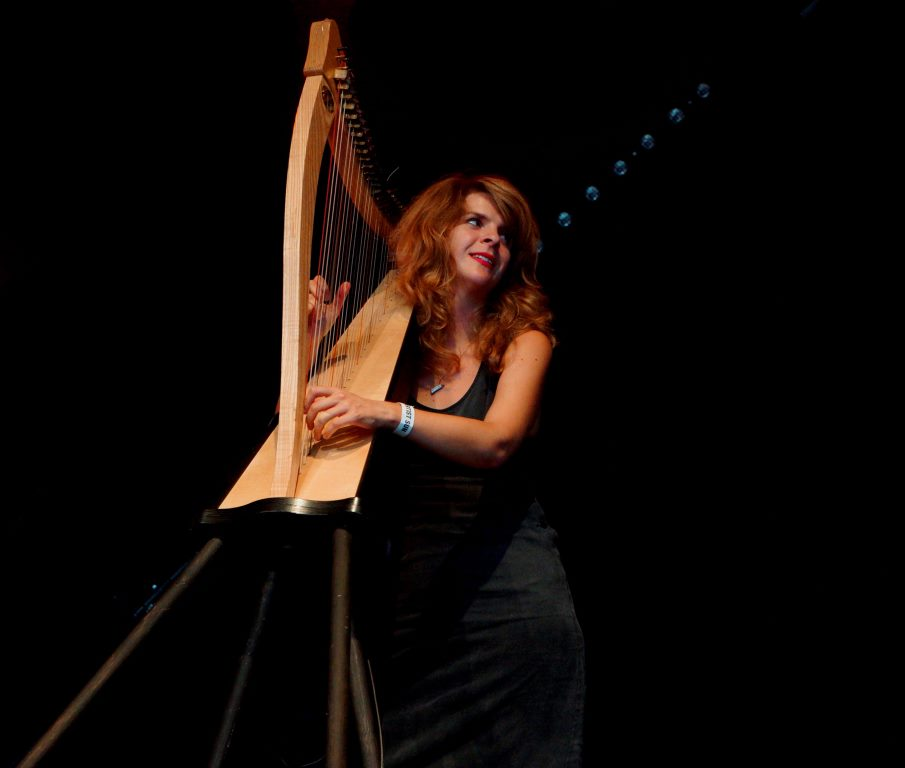
Serafina Steer at Manchester Pride on 25 August 2013

In 2013 she performed with Patrick Wolf at Manchester Pride

Steer has appeared with musicians including John T.Gast, Patrick Wolf, Tunng, Olivia Chaney, Hannah Peel, Rozi Plain, Bat for Lashes, The Last Dinner Party, Pet Shop Boys, Memory Band, Cleo Sol, James Yorkston, Adem, Chrome Hoof, Shimmy Rivers and Canal, Simon Bookish.

== Discography ==
=== Studio albums ===
- Cheap Demo Bad Science, 2007, Static Caravan
- Change is Good, Change is Good, 2010, Static Caravan
- The Moths Are Real, 2013, Stolen Recordings
- Yes I Jan, Bas Jan, 2018, Lost Map Records
- The Mind is a Trap, 2019, Vitamin Concept Records
- Baby U Know, Bas Jan, 2022, Lost Map Records
- Baby U Know (reissue), Bas Jan, 2023, Fire Records UK
- Back To The Swamp, Bas Jan, 2023, Fire Records UK

=== EPs ===
- Japan Tour EP, 2006, Static Caravan
- Public Spirited, 2008, Static Caravan
- Bloody Hell, 2010, Stolen Recordings
- Instant Nostalgia , 2022, Lost Map Records
- Drinking From The Pools Of Night, 2024, Fire Records

=== Singles ===
- "Peach Heart" / "Mano E Mano", 2007, Static Caravan
- "Disco Compilation"/ "Motion Pictures remix" (Simon Bookish Remix), 2013, Stolen Recordings
- "Garden Of Love"/ "Water Carrier" by Serafina Steer and John T.Gast, 2021, 5 Gate Temple

=== Compilations ===
- The Ground Bellow Me (Capitol K version of "Seven Bridge"), 2006 from Utrophia 03 Utrophia
- Cheap Demo Bad Science ("They Came From The Stars, I Saw Them" version) 2007, 93 Free CDs
- Uncomfortable (Capitol K version), 2007, Stolen Comp, Stolen Recordings
