= Fat Children =

Single by Jarvis Cocker

from the album Jarvis
- Released: 16 July 2007
- Recorded: 2006
- Genre: Post-Britpop
- Length: 3:23
- Label: Rough Trade
- Songwriter(s): Jarvis Cocker
- Producer(s): Graham Sutton

Jarvis Cocker singles chronology
"Don't Let Him Waste Your Time" (2007)	"Fat Children" (2007)	"Temptation (Live)" (2008)

"Fat Children" is a song by Jarvis Cocker, released as the second single from the debut solo album Jarvis. The single was released in the UK on 16 July 2007. The 7" vinyl single features the full length version of "The Loss Adjuster" which appeared on the album as two short snippets. There is also a remix of "Fat Children" by former Pulp bassist Steve Mackey on the 12" single. The single was a limited edition.

== Track listings ==
7" vinyl

1. "Fat Children"
2. "The Loss Adjuster"

12" vinyl

1. "Fat Children" (Fat Kidz "Let Them Eat Acid" Extra Large Remix)
2. "Fat Children"

Digital download

1. "Fat Children"
2. "Fat Children" (Fat Kidz "Let Them Eat Acid" Extra Large Remix)
3. "The Loss Adjuster"
