= Further Complications =

Studio album by Jarvis Cocker
- Released: 19 May 2009
- Genres: Britpop; indie pop
- Length: 49:17
- Label: Rough Trade
- Producer: Steve Albini

Jarvis Cocker chronology
Jarvis (2006)	Further Complications (2009)	Room 29 (2017)

Singles from Further Complications
- 1. "Angela" Released: 17 April 2009; 2. ""Further Complications."" Released: 2009

Further Complications (stylised as "Further complications.") is the second solo album by British musician Jarvis Cocker, released in the UK on 19 May 2009.

== Background and production ==
In July 2008, Cocker met Steve Albini in Chicago at the Pitchfork Music Festival. Together they tested some songs, liked the sound, and agreed to record an album together. Chicago performer Daniel Knox sings backing vocals on "Angela" and "Hold Still". The album has a heavier sound than debut Jarvis, something that Cocker attributes to realising his band "could rock", which led to him choosing to write with them. He told BBC 6 Music: "What I've tried to do with the new stuff, rather than me just sit there and wait for inspiration to come at some point – which takes ages – instead we've written stuff together. And it's a bit louder."

== Promotion ==
On the day of the album's release, Cocker spent two hours working in HMV in London, selling and signing copies over the counter and giving customers his own personal advice and recommendations on their purchases.

== Critical reception ==
Professional ratings
Aggregate scores
Source	Rating
AnyDecentMusic?	6.3/10
Metacritic	74/100
Review scores
Source	Rating
AllMusic	4.5/5 stars
Entertainment Weekly	B+
The Guardian	3/5 stars
NME	8/10
The Observer	3/5 stars
Pitchfork	6.5/10
PopMatters	8/10
Rolling Stone	3.5/5 stars
Spin	4/5 stars
Uncut	4/5 stars

The album attracted a positive response from critics, with AllMusic saying "the songs here pulsate with perversion, a middle-aged man making damn sure he's going to get with a tight 23-year-old body yet again," and declared it "impossible not to happily wallow in the flood of filth unleashed by Further Complications", whilst NME praised the album's "heavy-but-breathable fuzz-guitars and a granite-hard rock aesthetic, but with bluster bolted outside the studio door" and called the result "an absolute pleasure."

The Guardian highlighted other attributes, saying that "Further Complications is best when the music quietens, allowing the singer's glorious one-liners to be savoured", and Entertainment Weekly picked out Homewrecker! and "Further Complications" claiming that they "will come as a definite surprise to longtime Cocker watchers, though not necessarily a bad one", whilst deciding that Cocker's "droll wordplay" is "still the dominating factor" on such tracks as "I Never Said I Was Deep" and "Fuckingsong".

== Track listing ==
The added quotation marks around "Further Complications." are purposefully there, as featured on the album's sleeve.

All tracks are written by Cocker, except where noted.

No.	Title	Length
1.	""Further Complications.""	3:16
2.	"Angela"	2:56
3.	"Pilchard"	4:01
4.	"Leftovers"	6:06
5.	"I Never Said I Was Deep"	4:43
6.	"Homewrecker!"	3:18
7.	"Hold Still"	3:36
8.	"Fuckingsong"	3:00
9.	"Caucasian Blues"	3:08
10.	"Slush"	6:28
11.	"You're in My Eyes (Discosong)"	8:45
Total length:		49:17

Japanese edition bonus tracks
No.	Title	Length
12.	"Apparently"	3:36
13.	"I Found Myself Looking for God" (B-side to "Angela" single)	4:52
Total length:		57:45

== Personnel ==
- Jarvis Cocker – vocals, guitar (tracks 3, 10), synthesiser (tracks 6, 8, 11), fire bell (track 4), bass guitar (track 6), electric mandolin (track 9)
- Steve Mackey – bass guitar
- Ross Orton – drums, timpani
- Simon Stafford – keyboards, backing vocals, guitar, synthesiser
- Tim McCall – guitar
- Martin Craft – guitar, Vox Continental, piano
- Steve Mackay – saxophone (track 6)

== Chart positions ==
Chart (2009)	Peak position
UK Albums Chart	19
US Billboard 200	155

In 2009. It was awarded a silver certification from the Independent Music Companies Association which indicated sales of at least 30,000 copies throughout Europe.
