= Ladykillers (song) =

1996 single by Lush

Single by Lush

from the album Lovelife
- B-side: "I Wanna Be Your Girlfriend"
- Released: 26 February 1996
- Genre: Britpop; new wave
- Length: 3:46
- Label: 4AD
- Songwriter: Miki Berenyi
- Producers: Pete Bartlett; Lush

Lush singles chronology
"Single Girl" (1996)	"Ladykillers" (1996)	"500 (Shake Baby Shake)" (1996)

"Ladykillers" is a song by English rock band Lush. It was released through 4AD on 26 February 1996 as the second single from the band's third studio album, Lovelife (1996). Known for its feminist themes, the song became one of the band's bigger hits, peaking at No. 22 on the UK Singles Chart, No. 18 on the US Billboard Modern Rock Tracks chart, and No. 15 on the Canadian RPM Alternative 30 chart.

== Background ==
"Ladykillers" was described as a Britpop track and "a punky shot of Blondie-esque new wave". Lacking the reverb-indebted sound of the band's previous material, the track opened with "attention-seizing circular melody and spunky vocals" from lead vocalist Miki Berenyi. AllMusic's Stephen Thomas Erlewine said that it was influenced by "the direct, jagged pop of Elastica", but the band were annoyed by what Berenyi called "stupid Elastica comparisons".

The lyrics are narrated in the first-person, describing several unnamed men's attempts at seducing women. Berenyi later confirmed the second and third verses of the song were about American musicians Anthony Kiedis and Matt Sharp, respectively. Berenyi condemned Kiedis's behavior she witnessed during the 1996 Lollapalooza festival, labeling him as manipulative and detailing an incident in which Kiedis asked her to accompany him to a strip club, as well as what she perceived as his abuse of groupies during the tour.

== Critical reception ==
Annie Zaleski of The A.V. Club regarded the song as one of the album's standouts, describing it as "a welcome antidote to Britpop's masculine point of view". Zaleski further stated that the track is "a righteous feminist statement in which Lush reminds those with a Y chromosome that respecting women and treating them like smart, competent human beings is perhaps the best first step." Consequence of Sound critic Frank Mojica stated that Berenyi eviscerates "men with transparent agendas and dubious attitudes towards women everywhere with an infectiously sarcastic wit". He concluded: "It's what would have been hyped as a girl power anthem had it been released a couple years later." The track was included on VH1's list of "Top 10 Britpop Tracks".

== Music video ==
A music video for the song, directed by Mark Pellington, was released in 1996. It features the band performing the song, as well as footage of praying mantises decapitating one another.

== Track listings ==
UK 7-inch single

A. "Ladykillers" – 3:14
B. "I Wanna Be Your Girlfriend" (The Rubinoos cover) – 3:19

UK CD1

1. "Ladykillers"
2. "Matador"
3. "Ex"
4. "Dear Me" (Miki's 8-track home demo)

UK CD2

1. "Ladykillers"
2. "Heavenly"
3. "Carmen"
4. "Plums and Oranges"

== Personnel ==
Personnel are lifted from the UK CD1 liner notes.

Lush

- Lush – production
- Miki Berenyi – vocals, guitar
- Emma Anderson – guitar, vocals
- Phil King – bass guitar
- Chris Acland – drums

Technical personnel

- Pete Bartlett – production
- Paul Q. Kolderie – mixing
- Sean Slade – mixing
- Giles Hall – engineering
- Liam Molloy – engineering assistant
- v23 – art direction and design
- Ichiro Kono – photography

== Charts ==
Chart (1996)	Peak position
Canada Rock/Alternative (RPM)	15
Europe (Eurochart Hot 100)	49
Scottish Singles Sales (Official Charts)	28
UK Singles (Official Charts)	22
US Modern Rock Tracks (Billboard)	18

== Release history ==
Region	Date	Format(s)	Label(s)	Ref.
United States	19 February 1996	Alternative radio	4AD; Reprise	
United Kingdom	26 February 1996	7-inch vinyl; CD	4AD	
