= Jarvis Cocker =

English singer and musician (born 1963)

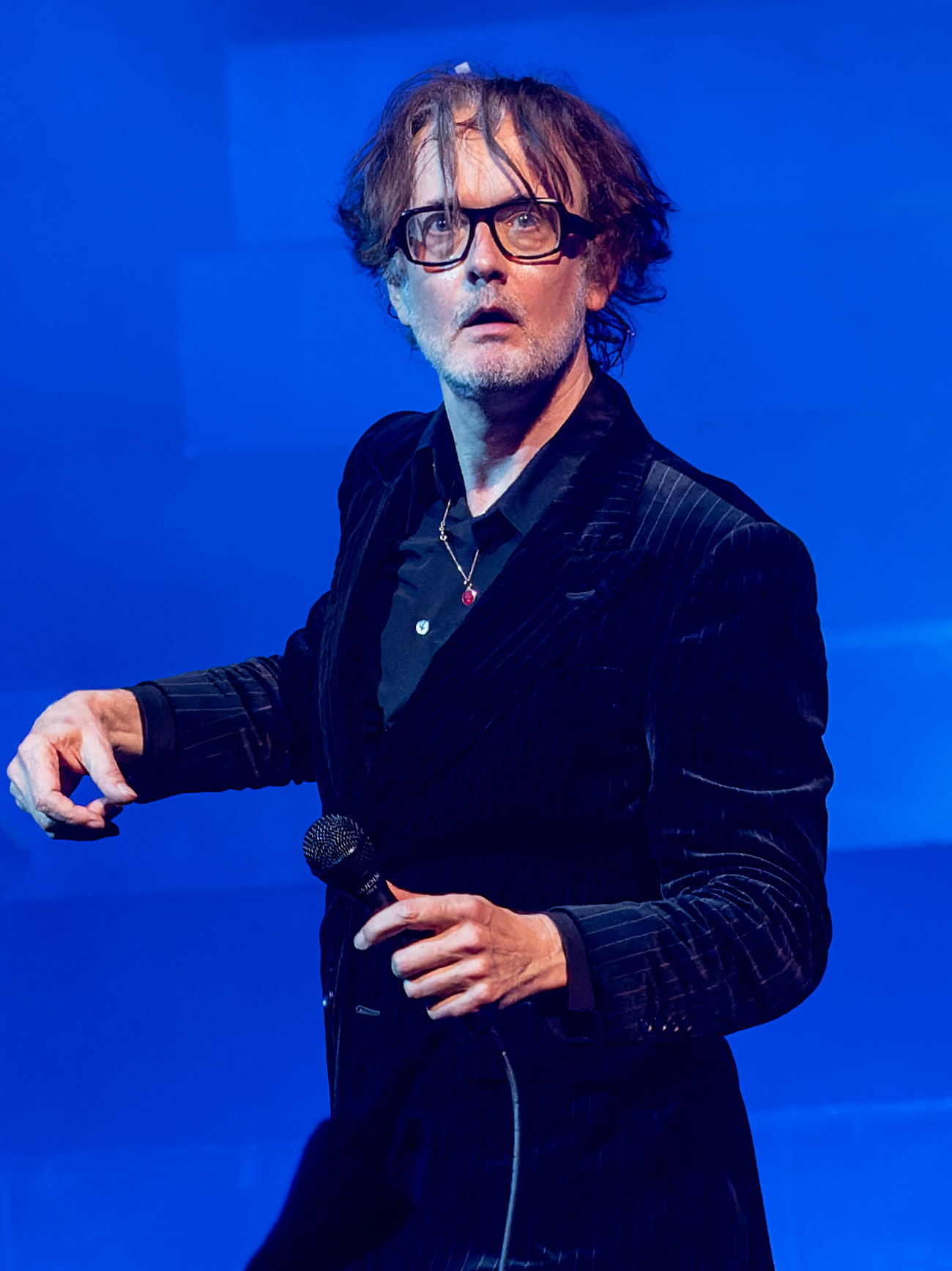
- Cocker in 2023

Background information
- Born: September 19, 1963 (age 63); Sheffield, West Riding of Yorkshire, England
- Genres: Alternative rock; post-punk; Britpop; indie rock; art rock
- Occupations: Singer; musician; songwriter; radio presenter
- Instruments: Vocals; guitar; keyboards
- Years active: 1978–present
- Member of: Pulp; Relaxed Muscle
- Spouses: Camille Bidault-Waddington (m. 2002; div. 2009); Kim Sion (m. 2024)
- Website: jarviscocker.net

Jarvis Cocker (born 19 September 1963) is an English musician. As the founder, frontman, lyricist and only consistent member of the band Pulp, he became a reluctant figurehead of the Britpop genre of the mid-1990s.

Cocker has also pursued a solo career, and for seven years he presented the BBC Radio 6 Music show Jarvis Cocker's Sunday Service. The Sunday Service returned to Radio 6 in 2026, and the programme will run for a year.

== Early life and education ==
Jarvis Cocker was born and grew up in Sheffield. He attended City School. His father, Mac Cocker, a DJ and actor, left the family and moved to Sydney, Australia, when Cocker was seven, and had no contact with his son or daughter, Saskia, until Jarvis was in his thirties. Following their father's departure, both children were brought up by their mother, Christine Connolly, who later became a Conservative councillor.

In the 1970s and 1980s, Mac Cocker was a radio DJ in Sydney with Double J (later renamed Triple J). Jarvis wrote a song ("A Little Soul" on This Is Hardcore) about being abandoned by his father and working briefly as a butler. In 1998, Cocker and his sister travelled to Australia to meet their father for the first time in nearly 30 years. Cocker later said he forgave his father (who died in 2016) for abandoning them, saying, "I don't feel any bitterness towards him at all. I feel sorry for him."

For much of the 1980s, Cocker lived on unemployment benefits in a derelict factory. In his twenties, Cocker squatted in London.

== Career ==
=== Pulp ===
Cocker founded the band Pulp originally under the name Arabicus Pulp (named after a tradable commodity he learned about in an economics class) at the age of 15 while he was a pupil at City School. After numerous line-up changes, and shortening the name to "Pulp", the band eventually found fame in the 1990s with the success of the albums His 'n' Hers (1994) and Different Class (1995). Cocker was Pulp's frontman, and part of his trademark image was his glasses, which seemed to "stay magically on his face" no matter what antics he performed. This feat was achieved using "a huge rubber band round the back" of his glasses.

Pulp released two more albums (This Is Hardcore and We Love Life) to critical acclaim, though neither achieved the commercial success of Different Class. After releasing a greatest hits album, the band went on hiatus from 2003 to 2010, then returned to activity in 2011. Pulp returned in 2022, touring and eventually releasing a new studio album More. The latter was a critical and commercial success, becoming Pulp's first No. 1 album since This Is Hardcore.

Cocker was a frequent guest on TV shows in the 1990s, such as Later... With Jools Holland, and hosted an art series for Channel 4 – Journeys into the Outside.< In the series, he took a trip across the globe, meeting so-called "outsider artists", people who create wacky and wonderful works of art, trying to understand what compelled them to do so. In 1996 Cocker performed a parody of "Common People" ("Showbiz People") on the satirical comedy show Spitting Image.

==== Brit Awards incident ====
While attending the 1996 Brit Awards, Cocker and Peter Mansell (a former Pulp member) invaded the stage in a spur-of-the-moment protest against Michael Jackson's performance. Jackson was performing his hit "Earth Song" while surrounded by children. Cocker was detained and interviewed by the police on suspicion of assault. He was accompanied by the comedian Bob Mortimer, who was attending the Brit Awards; Mortimer is a former solicitor and represented him in that capacity. Cocker was released without charge. Cocker later said, "My actions were a form of protest at the way Michael Jackson sees himself as some kind of Christ-like figure with the power of healing. I just ran on the stage. I didn't make any contact with anyone as far as I recall." He also clarified that his actions were nothing personal against Jackson and he was even a fan of his music.

Opinions in the press on Cocker's actions were mixed. Blur frontman Damon Albarn did not approve of Cocker's actions, saying he had found them "really disturbing". Melody Maker's edition of 2 March 1996 suggested Cocker should be knighted, and Noel Gallagher of Oasis said that "Jarvis Cocker is a star" and should be awarded an MBE. Though a number of people described Cocker's stunt as "mooning Jackson", Cocker denied it, saying that he merely waved his (clothed) bottom. Jackson said about the incident, "I'm sickened, saddened, shocked, upset, cheated and angry, but immensely proud that the cast remained professional and the show went on."

On 2 July 2009, soon after Jackson's death, Cocker appeared as a panellist on the BBC discussion program Question Time. He said that Jackson's death had been over-hyped by the media, saying that Jackson had not been making great records for the past 20 years. When asked what he objected to about Jackson at the time of the Brit Awards incident, he reiterated his earlier comments about Jackson and Christ. When asked, "Otherwise as a performer you thought he was a genius?" Cocker replied, "Yeah, he invented the moonwalk."

=== Solo career ===
==== Jarvis: 2006–2008 ====
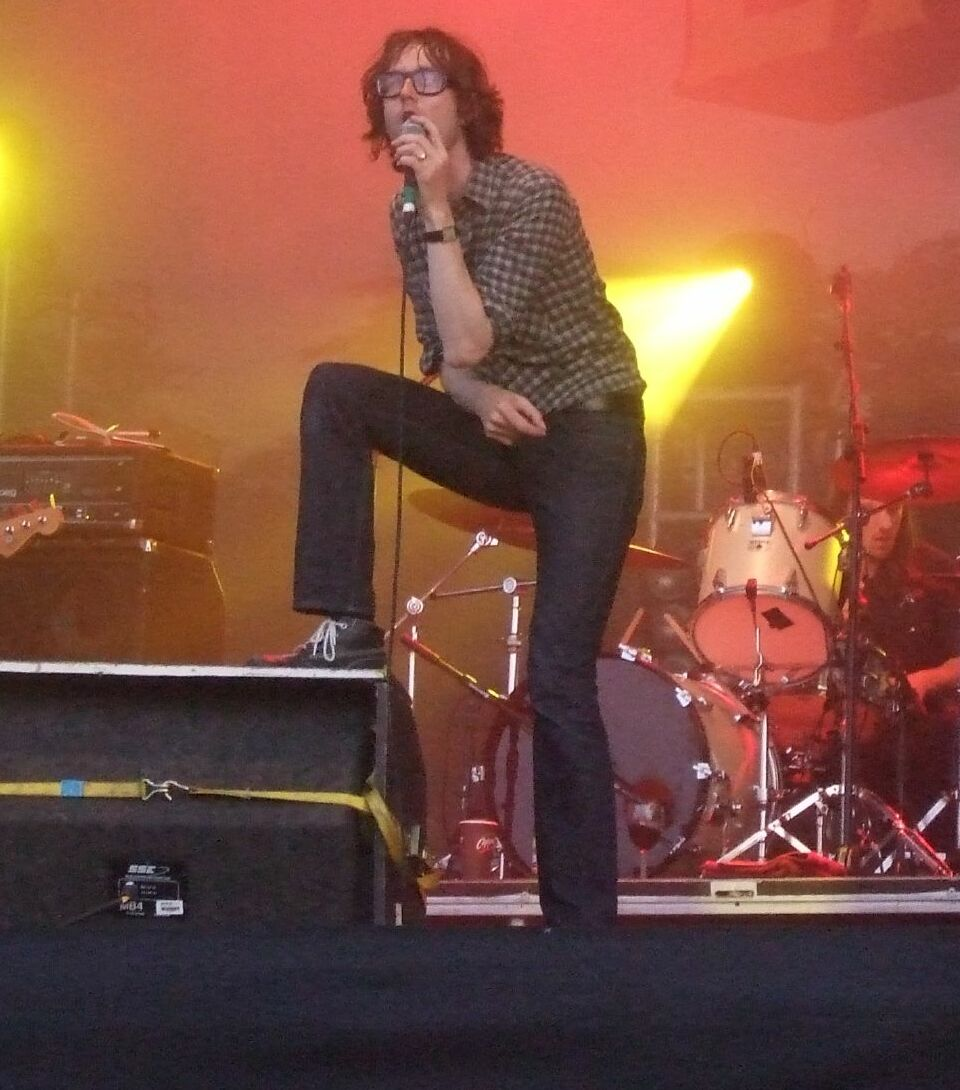
Jarvis Cocker performing at the Latitude Festival in 2007

Cocker's debut solo album, Jarvis, was released in the UK on 13 November 2006. At the 2006 Reading festival, the video for "Running the World" was played on the main video screens of the main stage throughout the day, including just before the headline act, Muse, performed. This video contained a karaoke-like presentation of the song's lyrics to encourage the crowd to sing along.

In March 2008, Cocker made a short tour of Latin America (Mexico, Argentina and Chile), where he presented a new song called "Girls Like It Too".

==== Further Complications: 2008–2009 ====
Cocker said that he had written "Girls Like It Too" and "The Usual", and hoped to have enough material to record the follow-up to his solo debut album. He said of the forthcoming studio album: "I've got vague ideas. I'd like to do another album before the end of the year."

Cocker debuted a new song, "Angela", on BBC2's "The Summer Exhibition: A Culture Show Special", on 13 June 2008. On 6 March 2009, Pitchfork revealed the cover art and album title for Further Complications, which was recorded by Steve Albini and released on 18 May 2009. Drowned in Sound stated that the album was "a huge leap forward" for Cocker.

In October 2011, Faber and Faber published a collection of his lyrics entitled Mother, Brother, Lover: Selected Lyrics.

==== Room 29: 2017 ====
In March 2017, he released Room 29, a collaboration with musician Chilly Gonzales. It was Cocker's first album in 8 years. Room 29 is a concept album about the Hollywood hotel the Chateau Marmont. Cocker stayed in room 29 at the hotel during a Pulp tour in 2012. The room contained a baby grand piano and inspired Cocker to wonder if the piano, possibly having been there for decades, could tell the stories of previous tenants. Each song on the album is a different story of a potential guest. The songs aren't all about the glamour of Hollywood, but the potential illusions and disappointments of the industry as well. It was performed as part of the Edinburgh International Festival in August 2017.

==== JARV IS...: 2017–present ====
In late 2017, Cocker formed a new band under the name "Jarv Is". Along with Cocker himself, the band comprises Serafina Steer (harp/keys), Emma Smith (violin), Andrew McKinney (bass), Jason Buckle and Adam Betts (drums). Primarily a live outfit, the band debuted a range of new material in intimate concerts at festivals in 2017, 2018 and 2019. On 15 May 2019, the band released their debut single "Must I Evolve?". The band played at Leith Theatre on 22 August 2019 as part of the Edinburgh International Festival's contemporary music programme. On 2 March 2020, Jarvis announced the band's debut album Beyond the Pale on Steve Lamacq's BBC Radio 6 show and released the single "House Music All Night Long". The album was scheduled to be released on 1 May 2020 on Rough Trade Records but this was later changed to 4 September 2020 and eventually the release date was brought forward to 17 July.

On 21 March 2022, Jarv Is released their original soundtrack to the BBC medical comedy-drama series This Is Going to Hurt.

=== Side projects ===
==== Musical ====
Cocker sang a duet, "Ciao!", with Miki Berenyi on Lush's 1996 album Lovelife. In 1997, he collaborated with David Arnold on a cover of "All Time High" by Rita Coolidge, the theme from Octopussy. Furthermore, he gained co-writing credits for several songs ("Walk Like a Panther", "1st Man in Space", "Drive Safely Darlin'", "Stars on Sunday", and "Happy Birthday Nicola") on The All Seeing I's album Pickled Eggs & Sherbet, released in 1999. He contributed lead vocals to "Drive Safely Darlin'". He also performed live with The All Seeing I on Top of the Pops, singing "Walk Like a Panther" in place of Tony Christie, who sang on the recorded version.

In 2001, he contributed "Everybody Loves the Underdog" to the soundtrack for Mike Bassett: England Manager. He re-emerged in 2003 to promote a new album, under the pseudonym "Darren Spooner", for his new band Relaxed Muscle. The same year, he appeared on the Richard X album Richard X Presents His X-Factor Vol. 1. In 2004, Cocker collaborated with Nancy Sinatra on her new album, as well as with Marianne Faithfull on her album Kissin Time, with the song "Sliding through Life on Charm."

In 2005, Cocker co-wrote three tracks ("La Degustation", "Basque Country" and "Fred de Fred") on Sheffield-based electronica duo The Lovers' self-titled debut album. That same year he also covered "I Can't Forget" by Leonard Cohen as part of the tribute show for the film Leonard Cohen: I'm Your Man. Cocker also contributed to the soundtrack for Harry Potter and the Goblet of Fire, writing and performing three tracks: "This Is the Night", "Do the Hippogriff" and "Magic Works". He appeared briefly in the film as lead singer of the band the Weird Sisters. The fictitious group also featured Jonny Greenwood and Phil Selway from Radiohead, Steve Mackey from Pulp, Jason Buckle from Relaxed Muscle and Steven Claydon from Add N to (X).

In 2006, Cocker appeared on albums Monsieur Gainsbourg Revisited (song "I Just Came to Tell You That I'm Going", co-performed with Kid Loco) and Rogue's Gallery: Pirate Ballads, Sea Songs, and Chanteys (song "A Drop of Nelson's Blood"). His song "Running the World" appeared over the closing credits of the film Children of Men. Also in 2006, along with Steve Mackey, he 'curated' the two-CD compilation, The Trip, which featured a wide selection of tracks by artists as varied as The Fall, Gene Pitney, The Beach Boys, and The Polecats. He also co-wrote lyrics on the Charlotte Gainsbourg album 5:55, with Neil Hannon and members of Air.

In 2007 Cocker and Beth Ditto (The Gossip) collaborated on a cover version of Heaven 17's "Temptation" at the NME Awards in London. That same year, Cocker contributed to two songs on French electronica group Air's album "Pocket Symphony" – performing on "One Hell of a Party" and (with Charlotte Gainsbourg) "The Duelist". He curated the 2007 Meltdown Festival at the South Bank Centre in London, UK. The line-up he chose included Motörhead, Roky Erickson and the Explosives with Clinic, Devo with Drumsize, Iggy & The Stooges, Cornershop, and The Jesus and Mary Chain.

In 2008, Cocker contributed "Born to Cry", (originally a Pulp song released on the Notting Hill soundtrack CD – though not featured in the film and co-written by Richard Hawley) to Tony Christie's album of songs by Sheffield-based songwriters, Made in Sheffield. Around 2008, Cocker also participated in a project that tackled the question, "What is Music?", designed to enter into the debate over the future of the music industry. Cocker asked: "Does this mean that music can now go back to being an art form again? Also, what happens if you get a band to rehearse in an art gallery instead of a rehearsal space?" Consequently, Cocker and his band installed themselves in an art gallery in Paris for five days. Each day, Cocker and his musicians performed a variety of different tasks. These included sound-tracking a relaxation class, inviting local musicians to join them in a jam and arranging activities with local school-children. Films of the exhibition remain accessible online in 2014.

In 2009, he was featured in the animated film Fantastic Mr. Fox and sang an original song, "Fantastic Mr. Fox AKA Petey's Song". In 2010, he worked with the National Trust to produce an album of sounds recorded at 11 of Britain's historically significant sites. In 2010 he also narrated Prokofiev's Peter and the Wolf at the Royal Festival Hall. Cocker sang vocals on the single "Synchronize" by Discodeine, a French production duo. The song appeared on the duo's first studio album, released through the on Dirty and Pschent labels on 14 February 2011.

Cocker performed the song "I'm Still Here" from Follies in the HBO documentary Six By Sondheim, in a segment directed by Todd Haynes. Cocker, alongside Jason Buckle, wrote, produced and sang backing vocals for the track "Worship Me now" on Marc Almond's album The Dancing Marquis (2014). "Jarvis is in there whispering over my shoulder like the Devil. It's very electro old school" states Almond in an interview with the Liverpool Echo. In November 2021, he teamed up with Gucci Soundsystem (a dance music project featuring Riton and Ben Rhymer) for the climate change-inspired "Let's Stick Around", which came with a video filmed in Glasgow around the time of the COP26 conference.

==== Music videos ====
Cocker has also directed music videos for, among others, Warp Records, including On by Aphex Twin, Sudden Rush by Erlend Øye and Aftermath by Nightmares on Wax (all three were co-directed with Martin Wallace). He also made brief appearances in the music videos for "A Little More for Little You" by Swedish rockers The Hives and "Fifteen Feet of Pure White Snow" by Nick Cave and the Bad Seeds.

==== Journeys into the Outside with Jarvis Cocker ====
Journeys into the Outside with Jarvis Cocker, a three-episode series, was broadcast in 1999 on Channel 4 and featured Cocker travelling the world to look at various forms of outsider art. Among the many locations he visited were:

- Simon Rodia's Watts Towers in Los Angeles, US
- The Rock Garden of Chandigarh by Nek Chand
- The Garden of Eden by Samuel P. Dinsmoor
- The sculpture garden of Las Pozas, Mexico by Edward James
- The land of Pasaquan, created by Eddie Owens Martin aka St. EOM
- Ferdinand Cheval's "Le Palais idéal"

The series was directed by longtime collaborator Martin Wallace.

=== Broadcasting ===
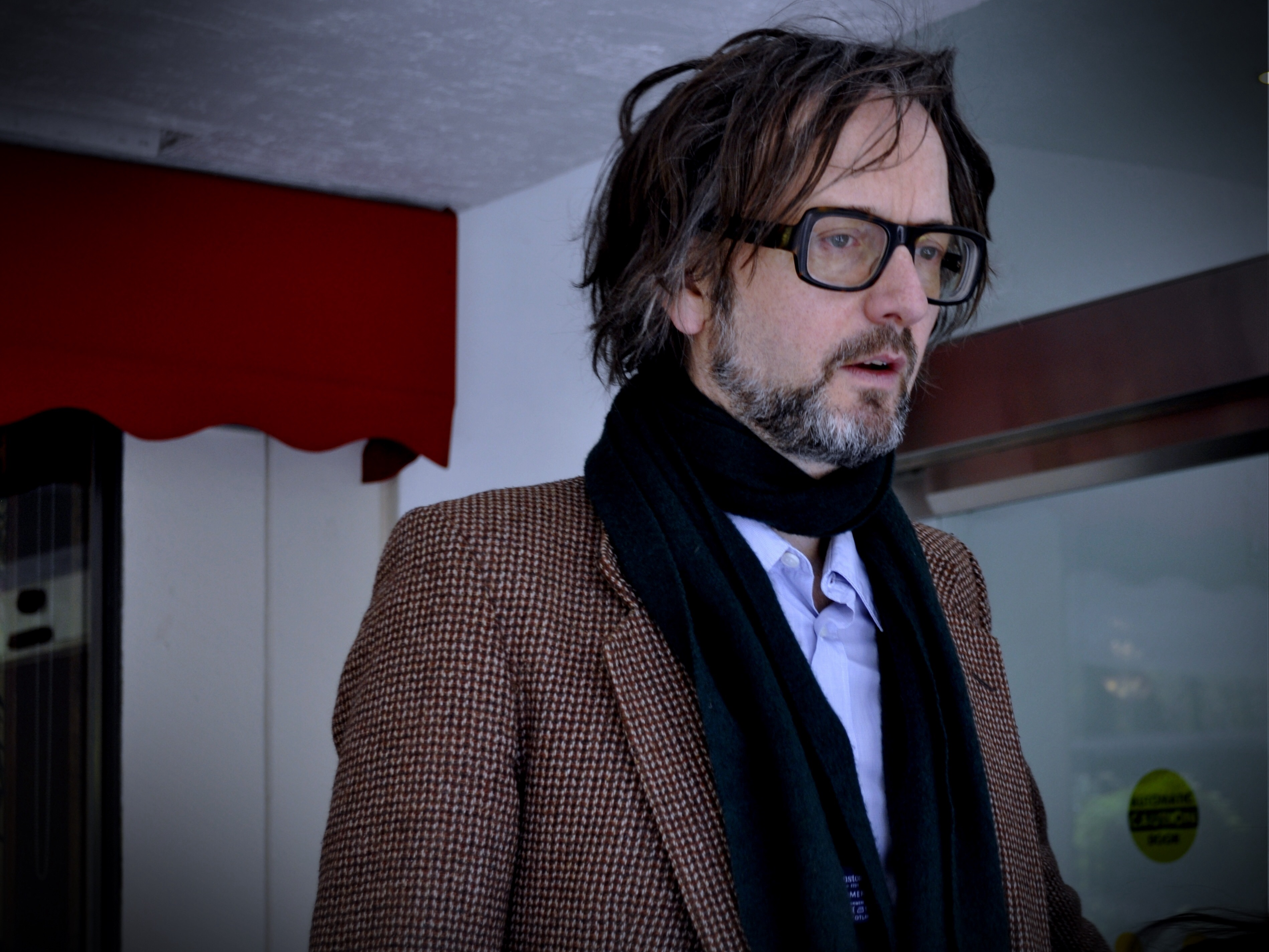
Cocker in 2012

On 3 October 1996, Cocker co-hosted the Australian Saturday morning programme Recovery with regular co host (and radio personality) Jane Gazzo.

On 12 October 2006, a fictional version of Cocker was a lead character in a drama on BBC Radio 2, as part of their "Imagine" competition. On 31 December 2008, Cocker guest edited the Today programme on BBC Radio 4. He also guested as a panellist on BBC's Question Time in July 2009.

In October 2009, BBC Radio 6 Music announced Cocker was set to take over the Sunday afternoon slot from 10 January 2010 onwards, with Jarvis Cocker's Sunday Service. He was quoted as saying "Sunday doesn't feel that different to the other days of the week any more. Although there was something weird about when everything seemed to stop on a Sunday, it kind of marked out the week. I am going to put the boringness back into Sunday. That's my mission." Cocker won the Sony DAB Rising Star Award 2010, voted for by listeners, for his BBC Radio 6 Music Show.

In January 2011 he appeared with fellow musician Richard Hawley and DJ Marc Riley on a Radio 4 programme, entitled "In Search of the Holy Whale", in which the trio embarked on a whale-watching expedition in the sea off Cork, Ireland. Then in 2012, Cocker began 'exploring the human condition after dark with tales of night people' in the award-winning Radio 4 programme, Wireless Nights. As of January 2019, 24 episodes of the programme have been broadcast. The first episode of the series, "Overnight Delivery", won the 2012 Prix Italia prize for 'extraordinary originality and / or innovation in a radio documentary'.

Cocker arranged for Iggy Pop to host the Radio 6 Music show in 2014, while he undertook a hiatus that involved Editor-at-Large duties for publisher Faber and Faber. Cocker explained in December 2013:

Crop Rotation has long been recognized as a way of preserving the fertility of the soil. Every now and again a field has to be left fallow for a year in order to make sure it has time to recover. In 2014 I will be that field. T'is done with the firm conviction that it will lead to a stronger and more vigorous Sunday Service when I return to 6 Music's pastures.

In 2015, Cocker appeared as part of that year's Proms, presenting the Wireless Nights Prom from the Royal Albert Hall with the BBC Philharmonic Orchestra.

In December 2017, Cocker presented his last Sunday Service programme for the BBC. Announcing the news, he said: "It's not goodbye, it's just farewell. We wanted to say farewell properly and so we're going to do a run of five extra-special shows throughout December, starting this Sunday. Let's keep warm together."

The Sunday Service returned in April 2026, retitled The Someday Service to reflect the programme's new on-demand availability on BBC Sounds. The Service will run for a year, covering Iggy Pop's regular slot on 6 Music while he is on break. In regards to his return, Cocker said: “Why am I returning to 6 Music? Well… I’m looking forward to working for the greatest independent radio station in the world once more. When you’re asked to look after Iggy’s show, are you really going to say no?"

=== Acting ===
He appears in Harry Potter and the Goblet of Fire (2005) as Myron Wagtail, lead singer of the Weird Sisters. His original scene was cut short, but most of the Blu-ray and D.V.D. releases hold the original scene in full-length with the entire 3:30-minute song in bonus features. He also played himself in the 2007 romantic comedy, The Good Night. American director Wes Anderson is an admirer of Cocker's work. This led to Anderson giving Cocker a role in the 2009 stop-motion animated movie Fantastic Mr. Fox as the voice of Petey, who sings an original song, and whose appearance is based on Cocker himself. He also voices a French pop singer in Anderson's 2021 film The French Dispatch. 2022 saw Cocker once again doing voice work on a stop-motion animated film, playing "Developer", a rat in The House, for which he wrote and performed the closing song This House. In 2023 he made an on-screen appearance as a musical cowboy in Wes Anderson's Asteroid City and in multiple roles in Anderson's The Wonderful Story of Henry Sugar.

=== Journalism and writing ===
In June 2011, Cocker was chosen as poetry guest editor for The Mays Anthology, a collection of new writing from students at Oxford and Cambridge.

In 2014, he was the Editor-at-Large for Faber and Faber, and Singing from the Floor by JP Bean is his first acquisition. Cocker explained to NME: "Singing from the Floor portrays an important movement in vernacular culture in the voices of the people who made it happen – and that's not an easy task ... JP Bean has captured this moment before it is lost forever, and has made it live again on the page. He's a very clever chap. Let's raise a glass to him." Cocker says he writes about 'the little things that stick in your mind' because most of them are 'eternal'.

In 2022, Cocker published a memoir-cum-"inventory" entitled Good Pop, Bad Pop, revisiting his formative years through clearing out his attic; Caroline Sullivan of The Guardian described the book as "terrific."

Cocker was a member of the 2026 Booker Prize for fiction selection committee. He described in an article for The Guardian newspaper how he made his selection from the 163 eligible novels while touring with Pulp.

== Personal life ==
Soon after signing to Fire, in November 1985, Cocker fell out of a window while trying to impress a girl with a Spider-Man impression and ended up in hospital, temporarily requiring the use of a wheelchair, in which he appeared during concerts.

In 1988, at age 25, Cocker took a sabbatical from Pulp to study Fine Art and Film at Saint Martin's School of Art, where he was tutored by Vera Neubauer and Malcolm Le Grice. He graduated in 1991.

In the late 1990s, Cocker dated Chloë Sevigny. Cocker lived in Paris from 2003 with his wife Camille Bidault-Waddington and their son. In April 2009 he announced that they were divorcing "on amicable terms", but that he was staying in Paris to remain in his son's life. Cocker had previously lived in Paris in the early 1990s, writing lyrics for Pulp's breakthrough album His 'n' Hers there, but he never learned to speak French, according to Bidault-Waddington.

As of 2023, Cocker lives in Shepherd's Bush, London, with his wife, creative consultant Kim Sion. The pair began dating in 2009.

Cocker is a supporter of Sheffield Wednesday.

== Activism ==
In 2010 Cocker was named Cultural Ambassador for Eurostar.

In 2015 Cocker was among the signatories of a pledge committing to Artists for Palestine UK. In 2016 Cocker voiced his support for Remain in the EU referendum.

== Discography ==
- Jarvis (2006) No. 37 UK
- Further Complications (2009) No. 19 UK, No. 155 US
- Room 29 (with Chilly Gonzales) (2017)
- Beyond the Pale (with Jarv Is) (2020)
- Chansons d'Ennui Tip-Top (2021)
- This Is Going to Hurt (Original Soundtrack) (with Jarv Is) (2022)
