= Elizabeth Fraser discography =

Music of Elizabeth Fraser

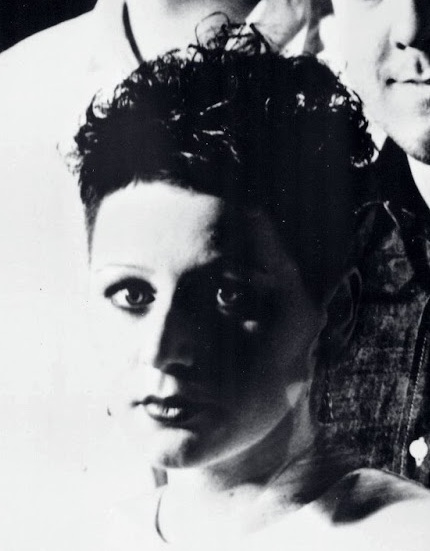
- Fraser with Cocteau Twins in 1986
- Studio albums: 1
- EPs: 1
- Singles: 4

This is a comprehensive discography listing of Scottish singer Elizabeth Fraser who first achieved success during the 1980s as the lead singer of the alternative rock band Cocteau Twins. The band have had several UK top 40 albums, with four of their studio albums also reaching the Billboard 200 albums chart in the United States. Commercially, their most successful studio album, Heaven or Las Vegas was released in 1990 and reached number seven in the United Kingdom and number ninety-nine in the United States. Heaven or Las Vegas was certified Silver by the British Phonographic Industry. It eventually sold 235,000 copies by 1996, according to Billboard. The album was included in the book 1001 Albums You Must Hear Before You Die, and was voted number 218 in the third edition of Colin Larkin's All Time Top 1000 Albums. In 2020, Rolling Stone listed it at No. 245 in its list of the 500 Greatest Albums of All Time. The band have had four of their studio albums reach number one on the UK Indie Chart.

Cocteau Twins have had six of their singles chart within the top 100 in the United Kingdom. Three of their singles were heavily played on the U.S. alternative radio stations and they charted within the top 10 of the US Alternative Songs Chart. Their 1984 single "Pearly-Dewdrops' Drops" reached number one on the UK Indie Chart. In 1986, they released a collaboration album The Moon and the Melodies with Harold Budd. Over the course of their musical career, the Cocteau Twins have released several compilation albums. Cocteau Twins split in 1997 following the release of Milk & Kisses (1996).

In 1998 Fraser co-wrote and performed several songs for Massive Attack's multi-award-winning album Mezzanine, including the band's most successful song: Teardrop. Some of Fraser's lyrics were an expression of how she felt about Jeff Buckley's death (the pair had previously been in a relationship). Fraser had a relationship with Jeff, and his father Tim Buckley through Song to the Siren which Fraser covered with the band This Mortal Coil in 1983. Both songs achieved more fame when they were featured in TV shows and films (House and Lost Highway).

After guest appearances and occasional soundtrack work, Fraser embarked on a relatively low–key solo career, releasing her debut single as a solo artist "Underwater" in 2000. This was followed by a second single, "Moses" in 2009, and by 2022, Fraser was a member of the duo Sun's Signature with her husband Damon Reece. Sun's Signature released a single, "Golden Air" in 2022, as well as a self–titled debut extended play album the same year.

== Discography ==
=== As Elizabeth Fraser ===
Title	Album details	Peak chart position	
Title	Album details	UK	UK Indie
The Moon and the Melodies (with Harold Budd, Robin Guthrie and Simon Raymonde)	Released: November 1986; Format: Vinyl, cassette; Label: 4AD	46	1

=== Cocteau Twins ===
==== Studio albums ====
Title	Album details	Peak chart position									Certifications (sales thresholds)
Title	Album details	UK	SCO	UK Indie	AUS	BEL	CAN	NZ	SWE	US	Certifications (sales thresholds)
Garlands	Released: 10 July 1982; Format: Vinyl, cassette; Label: 4AD (CAD211)	—	—	4	—	—	—	—	—	—	BPI: Silver
Head over Heels	Released: 24 October 1983; Format: Vinyl, cassette; Label: 4AD (CAD313)	51	—	1	—	—	—	—	—	—	BPI: Silver
Treasure	Released: 1 November 1984; Format: Vinyl, cassette; Label: 4AD (CAD412)	29	—	2	—	—	—	34	32	—	BPI: Silver
Victorialand	Released: April 1986; Format: Vinyl, cassette, CD; Label: 4AD (CAD602)	10	—	1	—	—	—	—	—	—	
Blue Bell Knoll	Released: 19 September 1988; Format: Vinyl, cassette, CD; Label: 4AD (CAD807)	15	—	1	—	—	—	—	—	109	
Heaven or Las Vegas	Released: 17 September 1990; Format: Vinyl, cassette, CD; Label: 4AD (00102)	7	—	—	—	—	—	—	—	99	BPI: Silver
Four-Calendar Café	Released: 18 October 1993; Format: Vinyl, cassette, CD; Label: Fontana (518 259-2) Capitol (US)	13	—	—	—	—	—	22	—	78	
Milk & Kisses	Released: 15 March 1996; Format: Vinyl, cassette, CD; Label: Fontana (514 501-2)	17	24	—	64	48	53	—	—	99	

==== Compilation albums ====
Title	Album details	Certifications	Additional information
Tiny Dynamine/Echoes in a Shallow Bay	Released: 1985; Format: CD, cassette; Label: 4AD		compilation album, combined release of two EPs.
The Pink Opaque	Released: 30 December 1985; Format: Vinyl, cassette; Label: 4AD, Relativity Records		compilation album, joint release by 4AD (UK) and Relativity Records (US)
The Box Set	Released: 4 November 1991; Format: Vinyl, cassette; Label: 4AD		ten-disc box set consisting of all EPs up to that point and one disc of bonus material
BBC Sessions	Released: 27 September 1999; Format: Vinyl, cassette, CD; Label: Bella Union, Rykodisc		compilation album of 8 BBC sessions recorded between 1982 and 1996
Stars and Topsoil	Released: 16 October 2000; Format: Vinyl, cassette, CD; Label: 4AD	BPI: Silver	compilation album (1982–1990)
Lullabies to Violaine: Singles and Extended Plays 1982–1996	Released: 21 November 2005; Format: CD, digital download; Label: 4AD		limited edition (10,000 units worldwide), four-disc box set of single and EP tracks
Lullabies to Violaine, Volume 1: Singles and Extended Plays 1982–1990	Released: 20 March 2006; Format: CD, digital download; Label: 4AD		first two of the four discs in box set shown above
Lullabies to Violaine, Volume 2: Singles and Extended Plays 1993–1996	Released: 20 March 2006; Format: CD, digital download; Label: 4AD		last two of the four discs in box set shown above
Treasure Hiding: The Fontana Years	Released: 19 October 2018; Format: CD, digital download; Label: Fontana		four-disc box set that includes Four-Calendar Café, Milk & Kisses, EPs, B-sides, and more

==== Extended plays ====
Title	EP details	Peak chart position			
Title	EP details	UK	SCO	UK Indie	NZ
Lullabies	Released: October 1982; Label: 4AD	—	—	11	—
Peppermint Pig	Released: April 1983; Label: 4AD	—	—	2	—
Sunburst and Snowblind	Released: 7 November 1983; Label: 4AD	86	—	2	—
The Spangle Maker	Released: 2 April 1984; Label: 4AD (BAD405)	29	—	2	—
Aikea-Guinea	Released: 4 March 1985; Label: 4AD (BAD501)	41	—	1	38
Tiny Dynamine	Released: 15 November 1985; Label: 4AD (BAD510)	52	—	1	—
Echoes in a Shallow Bay	Released: 29 November 1985; Label: 4AD (BAD511)	65	—	1	48
Love's Easy Tears	Released: October 1986; Label: 4AD (BAD610)	53	—	1	—
Snow	Released: December 1993; Label: Fontana	58	—	—	—
Twinlights	Released: September 1995; Label: Fontana	59	57	—	—
Otherness	Released: October 1995; Label: Fontana	59	55	—	—

==== Singles ====
Title	Year	Peak chart positions						Album
Title	Year	UK	SCO	UK Indie	POR	IRE	US Alt	Album
"Pearly-Dewdrops' Drops" (Note: "Pearly-Dewdrops' Drops" has the same charting position as The Spangle Maker EP.)	1984	29	—	1	—	—	—	The Spangle Maker
"Carolyn's Fingers"	1988	—	—	—	—	—	2	Blue Bell Knoll
"Iceblink Luck"	1990	38	—	—	—	22	4	Heaven or Las Vegas
"Heaven or Las Vegas"	1990	—	—	—	—	—	9	Heaven or Las Vegas
"Evangeline"	1993	34	—	—	4	—	—	Four-Calendar Café
"Bluebeard"	1994	33	77	—	—	—	—	Four-Calendar Café
"Tishbite"	1996	34	29	—	—	—	—	Milk & Kisses
"Violaine"	1996	56	66	—	—	—	—	Milk & Kisses

=== Solo career ===
==== Singles ====
- 1983: "Song to the Siren" (with This Mortal Coil) – UK No. 66 – (4AD)
- 2000: "Underwater" (Blanco Y Negro)
- 2009: "Moses" (Rough Trade)

==== Guest appearances ====
Artist	Album	Track(s)	Date	Label
Oneohtrix Point Never	Magic Oneohtrix Point Never (Blu-ray edition)	"Tales from the Trash Stratum"	2021	Warp
Jónsi	Shiver	"Cannibal"	2020	Krunk
Sam Lee	Old Wow	"The Moon Shines Bright"	2020	Cooking Vinyl Ltd
The Insects	The Living and the Dead Soundtrack	"She Moves Through the Fair"	2016	Self Released
Massive Attack	Collected	"Silent Spring"	2006	Virgin Records
Howard Shore	The Lord of the Rings: The Fellowship of the Ring: The Complete Recordings	"Caras Galadhon / Lament for Gandalf", "Lothlórien"	2005	Warner Brothers
Yann Tiersen	Les Retrouvailles	"Kala", "Mary"	2005	EMI
Various artists (compilation)	Stop Me If You Think You've Heard This One Before...	"At Last I Am Free" (originally by Chic)	2003	Rough Trade
Howard Shore	The Lord of the Rings: The Two Towers	"Isengard Unleashed"	2002	Warner Brothers
Peter Gabriel	OVO	"Downside Up", "Make Tomorrow"	2000	EMI
Elliot Goldenthal; Elizabeth Fraser	In Dreams	"Dream Baby"	1999	EMI
Massive Attack	Mezzanine	"Teardrop", "Black Milk" and "Group Four"	1998	Virgin Records
Michael Kamen	The Winter Guest	"Take Me With You"	1998	Universal
Craig Armstrong	The Space Between Us	"This Love"	1998	Melankolic
Simon Raymonde	Blame Someone Else	"Worship Me"	1997	Bella Union
The Bathers	Sunpowder	"Danger in Love", "The Dutch Venus", "Angel on Ruskin", "The Night is Young"	1995	Marina
Moose	Live a Little, Love a Lot	"Play God"	1995	Play It Again Sam Records
Fuel	Timeless EP	"Butterfly Knife"	1994	Diffusion Records
The Future Sound of London	Lifeforms [Remixes] EP	"Lifeforms 1–5 and 7"	1994	Astralwerks
Medicine	Sounds of Medicine	"Time Baby 3"	1994	Beggars Banquet
Peace Together feat. Peter Gabriel, Sinead O'Connor	Peace Together	"Be Still (remix)"	1993	Polygram
Ian McCulloch	Mysterio	"Heaven's Gate"	1992	Sire Records
Ian McCulloch	Candleland	"Candleland"	1989	Sire Records
The Wolfgang Press	Standing Up Straight	"I Am The Crime"	1986	4AD
Felt	Ignite the Seven Cannons	"Primitive Painters"	1985	Cherry Red
Dif Juz	Extractions	"Love Insane"	1985	4AD
This Mortal Coil	It'll End in Tears	"Song to the Siren", "Another Day"	1984	4AD
The Wolfgang Press	Scarecrow	"Respect"	1984	4AD
This Mortal Coil	Sixteen Days / Gathering Dust	"Song to the Siren", "Sixteen Days / Gathering Dust"	1983	4AD

=== Sun's Signature ===
==== Singles ====
- 2022: "Golden Air" (Partisan Records)

==== EP ====
- Sun's Signature (Partisan Records)

== See also ==
- Cocteau Twins discography
