= Cocteau Twins discography =

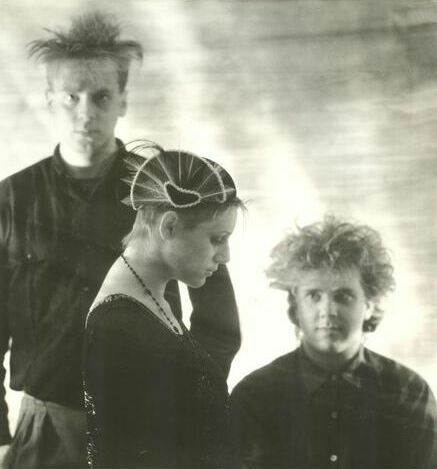
- Cocteau Twins in 1986, from L-R: Simon Raymonde, Elizabeth Fraser, Robin Guthrie
- Studio albums: 9
- Extended plays: 11
- Live albums: 1
- Compilation albums: 8
- Singles: 7
- Music videos: 22

The discography of Cocteau Twins, a Scottish gothic rock and dream pop band, includes nine studio albums, seven compilation albums, eleven extended plays and seven singles. Their debut album Garlands was released via the 4AD record label, reached number four on the UK Independent Albums Charts and was certified Silver by the British Phonographic Industry (BPI). Two extended play releases preceded the release of their second album – Lullabies (1982) and Peppermint Pig (1983), both of which charted within the UK Independent Albums Charts.

Their second album, Head over Heels (1983) marked their debut appearance on the official UK Albums Chart, debuting at number fifty one. Moderate commercial success ensued with the release of the EPs Sunburst and Snowblind (1983) and The Spangle Maker (1984), the latter of which spawned the commercially successful single "Pearly-Dewdrops' Drops" which reached number twenty-nine on the UK Singles Charts and number one on the UK Independent Singles Charts. Their third album, Treasure was released at the end of 1984 and became the bands first top thirty album in the United Kingdom, debuting at number twenty-nine on the UK Albums Charts. It was subsequently certified Silver by the BPI.

In April 1986, they released the first of two albums which would be released that year; Victorialand, which debuted at number ten in the United Kingdom, their first top ten appearance on the albums charts there. In November, they collaborated with American composer Harold Budd on the album The Moon and the Melodies, which was released under the bands own names – Elizabeth Fraser, Robin Guthrie and Simon Raymonde, and not Cocteau Twins. Blue Bell Knoll, their fifth album, followed in 1988: it gave the band their first appearance on the US Billboard 200 albums chart with Blue Bell Knoll where it reached number 109.

At the end of August 1990, they released "Iceblink Luck" as the lead single from their forthcoming sixth album, Heaven or Las Vegas (1990). The single achieved commercial success, reaching the top forty in the United Kingdom and in Ireland. The single also peaked at number 91 in the European Hot 100 Singles. The release of Heaven or Las Vegas would become their most commercially successful album in the United Kingdom to date, reaching the top ten and being certified Silver by the BPI. In the United States, it reached ninety-nine on the Billboard 200 and stayed nineteen weeks in that chart. The song "Cherry-Coloured Funk" from the album, despite not being released as a single, was later certified Gold by the Recording Industry Association of America (RIAA).

By the release of their seventh album, Four-Calendar Café (1993), Cocteau Twins had left their record label 4AD and signed with Fontana. The album became their highest charting in the United States, peaking at number seventy-eight on the Billboard 200 while staying in the chart for three weeks. The supporting singles from the album – "Evangeline" and "Bluebeard" both reached the UK Top 40, with the latter giving the band their debut appearance on their native singles charts in Scotland, reaching number seventy-seven. Their eighth and final album, Milk & Kisses, was released in 1996, supported by the singles "Tishbite" and "Violaine". Cocteau Twins disbanded in 1997, citing "irreconcilable differences". Since, a number of compilation albums have been released, notably Stars and Topsoil (2000), which was certified Silver in the United Kingdom.

== Albums ==
=== Studio albums ===
Title	Album details	Peak chart position									Certifications (sales thresholds)
Title	Album details	UK	SCO	UK Indie	AUS	BEL	CAN	NZ	SWE	US	Certifications (sales thresholds)
Garlands	Released: 10 July 1982; Format: Vinyl, cassette; Label: 4AD (CAD211)	—	—	4	—	—	—	—	—	—	BPI: Silver
Head over Heels	Released: 24 October 1983; Format: Vinyl, cassette; Label: 4AD (CAD313)	51	—	1	—	—	—	—	—	—	BPI: Silver
Treasure	Released: 12 November 1984; Format: Vinyl, cassette; Label: 4AD (CAD412)	29	—	2	—	—	—	34	32	—	BPI: Silver
Victorialand	Released: April 1986; Format: Vinyl, cassette, CD; Label: 4AD (CAD602)	10	—	1	—	—	—	—	—	—	
Blue Bell Knoll	Released: 19 September 1988; Format: Vinyl, cassette, CD, DAT; Label: 4AD (CAD807) Capitol (US only)	15	—	1	119	—	—	—	—	109	
Heaven or Las Vegas	Released: 17 September 1990; Format: Vinyl, cassette, CD; Label: 4AD (00102) Capitol (US only)	7	—	—	130	—	—	—	—	99	BPI: Gold
Four-Calendar Café	Released: 18 October 1993; Format: Vinyl, cassette, CD; Label: Fontana (518 259-2) Capitol (US only)	13	—	—	111	—	—	22	—	78	
Milk & Kisses	Released: 15 April 1996; Format: Vinyl, cassette, CD; Label: Fontana (514 501-2)	17	24	—	64	48	53	—	—	99	

=== Collaborative albums ===
Title	Album details	Peak chart position	
Title	Album details	UK	UK Indie
The Moon and the Melodies (with Harold Budd)	Released: November 1986; Format: Vinyl, cassette; Label: 4AD	46	1

=== Compilation albums ===
Title	Album details	Certifications	Additional information
Tiny Dynamine/Echoes in a Shallow Bay	Released: 1985; Format: CD, cassette; Label: 4AD		compilation album, combined release of two EPs.
The Pink Opaque	Released: 30 December 1985; Format: Vinyl, cassette, CD; Label: 4AD, Relativity Records		compilation album, joint release by 4AD (UK) and Relativity Records (US)
The Box Set	Released: 4 November 1991; Format: Vinyl, cassette; Label: 4AD		ten-disc box set consisting of all EPs up to that point and one disc of bonus material
BBC Sessions	Released: 27 September 1999; Format: Vinyl, cassette, CD; Label: Bella Union, Rykodisc		compilation album of 8 BBC sessions recorded between 1982 and 1996
Stars and Topsoil	Released: 16 October 2000; Format: Vinyl, cassette, CD; Label: 4AD	BPI: Silver	compilation album (1982–1990)
Lullabies to Violaine: Singles and Extended Plays 1982–1996	Released: 21 November 2005; Format: CD, digital download; Label: 4AD		limited edition (10,000 units worldwide), four-disc box set of single and EP tracks
Lullabies to Violaine, Volume 1: Singles and Extended Plays 1982–1990	Released: 20 March 2006; Format: CD, digital download; Label: 4AD		first two of the four discs in box set shown above
Lullabies to Violaine, Volume 2: Singles and Extended Plays 1993–1996	Released: 20 March 2006; Format: CD, digital download; Label: 4AD		last two of the four discs in box set shown above
Treasure Hiding: The Fontana Years	Released: 19 October 2018; Format: CD, digital download; Label: Fontana		four-disc box set that includes Four-Calendar Café, Milk & Kisses, EPs, B-sides, and more

== Extended plays ==
Title	EP details	Peak chart position			
Title	EP details	UK	SCO	UK Indie	NZ
Lullabies	Released: October 1982; Label: 4AD	—	—	11	—
Peppermint Pig	Released: 4 April 1983; Label: 4AD	—	—	2	—
Sunburst and Snowblind	Released: 18 November 1983; Label: 4AD	86	—	2	—
The Spangle Maker	Released: 2 April 1984; Label: 4AD (BAD405)	29	—	2	—
Aikea-Guinea	Released: 18 March 1985; Label: 4AD (BAD501)	41	—	1	38
Tiny Dynamine	Released: 15 November 1985; Label: 4AD (BAD510)	52	—	1	—
Echoes in a Shallow Bay	Released: 29 November 1985; Label: 4AD (BAD511)	65	—	1	48
Love's Easy Tears	Released: 1 September 1986; Label: 4AD (BAD610)	53	—	1	—
Twinlights	Released: September 1995; Label: Fontana	59	57	—	—
Otherness	Released: October 1995; Label: Fontana	59	55	—	—

== Singles ==
Title	Year	Peak chart positions							Album
Title	Year	UK	SCO	UK Indie	AUS	POR	IRE	US Alt	Album
"Pearly-Dewdrops' Drops" (Note: "Pearly-Dewdrops' Drops" has the same charting position as The Spangle Maker EP.)	1984	29	—	1	—	—	—	—	The Spangle Maker
"Iceblink Luck"	1990	38	—	—	—	—	22	4	Heaven or Las Vegas
"Evangeline"	1993	34	—	—	135	4	—	—	Four-Calendar Café
"Snow"	1993	58	—	—	—	—	—	—	non-album single
"Bluebeard"	1994	33	77	—	—	—	—	—	Four-Calendar Café
"Tishbite"	1996	34	29	—	168	—	—	—	Milk & Kisses
"Violaine"	1996	56	66	—	—	—	—	—	Milk & Kisses

=== Promotional singles ===
Title	Year	Peak chart positions	Album
Title	Year	Modern Rock Tracks	Album
"Carolyn's Fingers"	1988	2	Blue Bell Knoll
"Heaven or Las Vegas"	1990	9	Heaven or Las Vegas

== Other certified songs ==
List of other certified songs, showing year released and album name
Title	Year	Certifications	Album
"Cherry-Coloured Funk"	1990	ARIA: Gold; RIAA: Gold; BPI: Silver	Heaven or Las Vegas

== Music videos ==
Title	Year	Director(s)
"Wax and Wane"	1983	
"Sugar Hiccup"	1984	
"Pearly-Dewdrops' Drops"	1984	Nigel Grierson
"Song to the Siren" (released as This Mortal Coil)	1984	Ivo Watts-Russell
"Pandora (for Cindy)" (unreleased)	1984	
"Aikea-Guinea"	1985	John Scarlett-Davis
"Pink Orange Red"	1985	Gavin Taylor
"Love's Easy Tears"	1986	
"Crushed"	1987	Nico Beyer
"Carolyn's Fingers"	1988	Walter Stern
"Blue Bell Knoll" (live)	1988	
"Cico Buff"	1988	
"Iceblink Luck"	1990	Howard Greenhalgh
"Heaven or Las Vegas"	1990	Howard Greenhalgh
"Evangeline"	1993	Nico Beyer
"Bluebeard"	1993	Paul Donnellon
"Rilkean Heart" (version 1)	1995	
"Rilkean Heart" (Rilkean Dreams interlude)	1995	
"Half-Gifts"	1995	
"Tishbite"	1996	Dave Shum
"Pearly-Dewdrops' Drops" (higher resolution cut edit)	2005	Nigel Grierson
