= Lullabies to Violaine =

Compilation album by Cocteau Twins

Box set by Cocteau Twins
- Released: 21 November 2005
- Recorded: 1981–1996
- Genre: Gothic rock, ethereal wave, dream pop
- Length: 231:23
- Label: 4AD

Cocteau Twins chronology
Stars and Topsoil (2000)	Lullabies to Violaine (2005)	Lullabies to Violaine: Volume 1 (2006)

Professional ratings
Review scores
Source	Rating
AllMusic	4.5/5 stars
The Guardian	5/5 stars

Lullabies to Violaine: Volume 1

Box set by Cocteau Twins
- Released: 13 February 2006
- Recorded: 1981–1990
- Genre: Gothic rock, ethereal
- Length: 124:43
- Label: 4AD

Cocteau Twins chronology
Lullabies to Violaine (2005)	Lullabies to Violaine: Volume 1 (2006)	Lullabies to Violaine: Volume 2 (2006)

Professional ratings
Review scores
Source	Rating
Martin C. Strong	8/10
Pitchfork	8.5/10
PopMatters	7/10
Stylus Magazine	A−

Lullabies to Violaine: Volume 2

Box set by Cocteau Twins
- Released: 13 February 2006
- Recorded: 1990–1996
- Genre: Dream pop
- Length: 106:40
- Label: 4AD

Cocteau Twins chronology
Lullabies to Violaine: Volume 1 (2006)	Lullabies to Violaine: Volume 2 (2006)

Professional ratings
Review scores
Source	Rating
Martin C. Strong	7/10
Pitchfork	7.8/10
PopMatters	5/10
Stylus Magazine	B

Lullabies to Violaine is a Cocteau Twins box set released in limited quantities by 4AD Records in November 2005. Comprising four CDs, the box set collects the tracks from every Cocteau Twins EP and single from Lullabies to Violaine, except the 1990 "Heaven or Las Vegas" single and the four songs on the 1991 EPs and Singles & Box Set bonus disc. It was also released as two separate double CD packs titled Lullabies to Violaine: Volume 1 and Lullabies to Violaine: Volume 2 the following year.

== Track listing ==
All tracks written by Elizabeth Fraser, Robin Guthrie and Simon Raymonde; except where indicated.

=== Disc one ===
Lullabies

1. "Feathers-Oar-Blades" (Fraser, Guthrie, Will Heggie) – 4:26
2. "Alas Dies Laughing" (Fraser, Guthrie, Heggie) – 3:38
3. "It's All But an Ark Lark" (Fraser, Guthrie, Heggie) – 8:04

Peppermint Pig

4. "Peppermint Pig" (7" version) (Fraser, Guthrie, Heggie) – 3:24
5. "Laughlines" (Fraser, Guthrie, Heggie) – 3:19
6. "Hazel" (Fraser, Guthrie, Heggie) – 2:49

Sunburst & Snowblind

7. "Sugar Hiccup" (12" version) (Fraser, Guthrie) – 3:37
8. "From the Flagstones" (Fraser, Guthrie) – 3:38
9. "Hitherto" (Fraser, Guthrie) – 3:52
10. "Because of Whirl-Jack" (Fraser, Guthrie) – 3:26

The Spangle Maker

11. "The Spangle Maker" – 4:40
12. "Pearly-Dewdrops' Drops" (alternate version) – 4:47
13. "Pepper-Tree" – 3:58

Aikea-Guinea

14. "Aikea-Guinea" (alternate version) – 3:57
15. "Kookaburra" – 3:18
16. "Quisquose" – 4:10
17. "Rococo" – 3:05

=== Disc two ===
Tiny Dynamine

1. "Pink Orange Red" – 4:37
2. "Ribbed and Veined" – 3:55
3. "Plain Tiger" – 4:01
4. "Sultitan Itan" – 3:49

Echoes in a Shallow Bay

5. "Great Spangled Fritillary" – 4:02
6. "Melonella" – 4:01
7. "Pale Clouded White" – 4:59
8. "Eggs and Their Shells" – 3:04

Love's Easy Tears

9. "Love's Easy Tears" – 3:35
10. "Those Eyes, That Mouth" – 3:38
11. "Sigh's Smell of Farewell" – 3:34
12. "Orange Appled" – 2:49

Iceblink Luck

13. "Iceblink Luck" – 3:15
14. "Mizake the Mizan" – 3:00
15. "Watchlar" – 3:16

=== Disc three ===
Evangeline

1. "Evangeline" – 4:29
2. "Mud and Dark" – 3:40
3. "Summer-Blink" – 3:10

Snow

4. "Winter Wonderland" (Dick Smith, Felix Bernard) – 2:51
5. "Frosty the Snowman" (Jack Rollins, Steve Nelson) – 2:55

Bluebeard

6. "Bluebeard" – 3:54
7. "Three-Swept" – 3:37
8. "Ice-Pulse" – 3:46
9. "Bluebeard" (acoustic version) – 3:05

Twinlights

10. "Rilkean Heart" (acoustic version) – 2:21
11. "Golden-Vein" (acoustic version) – 2:50
12. "Pink Orange Red" (acoustic version) – 4:30
13. "Half-Gifts" (acoustic version) – 4:14

=== Disc four ===
Otherness

1. "Feet-Like Fins" (Fraser, Guthrie) – 5:31
2. "Seekers Who Are Lovers" – 5:40
3. "Violaine" – 5:07
4. "Cherry-Coloured Funk" – 5:46
  - All tracks remixed by Mark Clifford

Tishbite

5. "Tishbite" – 3:12
6. "Primitive Heart" – 4:07
7. "Flock of Soul" – 3:36
8. "Round" – 3:36
9. "An Elan" – 4:36

Violaine

10. "Violaine" – 3:47
11. "Smile" – 4:27
12. "Tranquil Eye" – 3:53
13. "Circling Girl" – 3:33
14. "Alice" – 4:27

=== Notes ===
==== Disc one ====
- Lullabies: Released October 1982 through 4AD.
  - Produced by Ivo Watts-Russell. Recorded at Palladium Studios, Edinburgh, engineered by Jon Turner. Mixed at Blackwing Studios, London, engineered by John Fryer.
- Peppermint Pig: Released March 1983 through 4AD.
  - Produced by Alan Rankine. Engineered by John Fryer. Recorded at Blackwing Studios, London.
- Sunburst and Snowblind: Released November 1983 through 4AD.
  - Produced by Cocteau Twins and John Fryer, except “Sugar Hiccup” and “Hitherto,” produced by Cocteau Twins. Recorded and mixed at Palladium Studios, Edinburgh.
- The Spangle Maker: Released April 1984 through 4AD.
  - Produced by Cocteau Twins. “The Spangle Maker” and “Pepper-Tree” recorded at Palladium Studios, Edinburgh, engineered by Jon Turner and mixed at Rooster, London, engineered by John Madden. “Pearly-Dewdrops’ Drops” recorded and engineered by John Madden at Rooster, London.
- Aikea-Guinea: Released March 1985 through 4AD.
  - Produced by Cocteau Twins. Engineered by Ken Thomas. Recorded at Jacobs Studios, Farnham.

==== Disc two ====
- Tiny Dynamine: Released November 1985 through 4AD.
  - Produced by Cocteau Twins. Recorded at Guerilla, London. Mixed at Aosis, London.
- Echoes in a Shallow Bay: Released November 1985 through 4AD.
  - Produced by Cocteau Twins. Recorded at Guerilla, London. Mixed at Aosis, London.
- Love's Easy Tears: Released October 1986 through 4AD.
  - Produced by Cocteau Twins. Recorded and mixed at Good Earth, London.
- Iceblink Luck: Released August 1990 through 4AD/Capitol.
  - Produced by Cocteau Twins. Recorded and mixed at September Sound, London.

==== Disc three ====
- Evangeline: Released September 1993 through Fontana/Mercury.
  - Produced by Cocteau Twins. Recorded and mixed at September Sound, London. Additional engineering by Lincoln Fong. Additional guitars on “Evangeline” by Mitsuo Tate and Ben Blakeman.
- Snow: Released December 1993 through Fontana/Mercury & Capitol.
  - Produced by Cocteau Twins. Recorded and mixed at September Sound, London. Additional engineering by Lincoln Fong. “Winter Wonderland” written by Felix Bernard and Dick Smith. “Frosty the Snowman” written by Jack Rollings and Steve Nelson.
- Bluebeard: Released February 1994 through Fontana/Mercury & Capitol.
  - Produced by Cocteau Twins. Recorded and mixed at September Sound, London. Additional engineering by Lincoln Fong.
- Twinlights: Released September 1995 through Fontana/Mercury & Capitol.
  - Produced by Cocteau Twins. Recorded and mixed at September Sound, London. Additional recordings at Wessex, London. String arrangements for “Half-Gifts” by Thomas M. Hill.

==== Disc four ====
- Otherness: Released October 1995 through Fontana/Mercury & Capitol.
  - Recycled by Mark Clifford. Mixed at September Sound and Polyfusion, London.
- Tishbite: Released March 1996 through Fontana/Mercury & Capitol.
  - Produced by Cocteau Twins. Recorded at September Sound, London. Additional engineering by Des Ward, Mitsuo Tate, and Lincoln Fong.
- Violaine: Released October 1996 though Fontana/Mercury & Capitol.
  - Produced by Cocteau Twins. Recorded at September Sound, London. Additional engineering by Mitsuo Tate.
