= Stars and Topsoil =

2000 compilation album by the Cocteau Twins

Stars and Topsoil – A Collection (1982–1990)

Greatest hits album by Cocteau Twins
- Released: 16 October 2000
- Recorded: 1981–1990
- Genre: Ethereal wave, dream pop
- Length: 72:14
- Label: 4AD

Cocteau Twins chronology
BBC Sessions (1999)	Stars and Topsoil – A Collection (1982–1990) (2000)	Lullabies to Violaine (2005)

Professional ratings
Review scores
Source	Rating
AllMusic	4.5/5 stars

Stars and Topsoil – A Collection (1982–1990) is a compilation album by the Scottish band Cocteau Twins, released on the 4AD label on October 16, 2000. The album featured tracks released during the group's time on 4AD between 1982 and 1990, covering every Cocteau Twins album from Garlands through Heaven or Las Vegas. The collection reached number sixty-three on the UK Albums Chart.

== Track listing ==
All songs written by Elizabeth Fraser, Robin Guthrie and Simon Raymonde; except where indicated.

1. "Blind Dumb Deaf" (Fraser, Guthrie, Will Heggie) - 3:47
2. "Sugar Hiccup" (Fraser, Guthrie) - 3:41
3. "My Love Paramour" (Fraser, Guthrie) - 3:38
4. "Pearly-Dewdrops' Drops" - 4:11
5. "Lorelei" - 3:43
6. "Pandora" - 5:26
7. "Aikea-Guinea" - 3:57
8. "Pink Orange Red" - 4:38
9. "Pale Clouded White" - 4:59
10. "Lazy Calm" (Fraser, Guthrie) - 6:34
11. "The Thinner The Air" (Fraser, Guthrie) - 3:16
12. "Orange Appled" - 2:50
13. "Cico Buff" - 3:46
14. "Carolyn's Fingers" - 3:06
15. "Fifty-Fifty Clown" - 3:11
16. "Iceblink Luck" - 3:18
17. "Heaven or Las Vegas" - 4:55
18. "Watchlar" - 3:17

Tracks taken from

- 1: Garlands (1982)
- 2-3: Head over Heels (1983)
- 4: The Spangle Maker EP (1984)
- 5-6: Treasure (1984)
- 7: Aikea-Guinea EP (1985)
- 8: Tiny Dynamine EP (1985)
- 9: Echoes in a Shallow Bay EP (1985)
- 10-11: Victorialand (1986)
- 12: Love's Easy Tears EP (1986)
- 13-14: Blue Bell Knoll (1988)
- 15-17: Heaven or Las Vegas (1990)
- 18: "Iceblink Luck" single (1990)

== Personnel ==
- Elizabeth Fraser - vocals
- Robin Guthrie - guitars
- Simon Raymonde - bass guitar
- Will Heggie - bass guitar on "Blind Dumb Deaf"
- All tracks produced by Cocteau Twins except as indicated below:
  - "Blind Dumb Deaf" produced by Ivo/Cocteau Twins.
  - "Sugar Hiccup" and "My Love Paramour" produced by Cocteau Twins and John Fryer.
- Mastered by Robin Guthrie and Walter Coelho.
- Liner notes written by Alan Warner.
- Art direction by Vaughan Oliver at v23.
- Photography by Dominic Davies.
- Graphic design by Martin Andersen at v23.
- Original sleeve photography by Nigel Grierson.
- Original sleeve design by 23 Envelope.

== Certifications ==
Region	Certification	Certified units/sales
United Kingdom (BPI)	Silver	60,000^{‡}
^{‡} Sales+streaming figures based on certification alone.
