= The Box Set (Cocteau Twins album) =

Box set by Cocteau Twins
- Released: 4 November 1991
- Recorded: 1981–1990
- Genres: Gothic rock, ethereal, dream pop
- Label: 4AD - CT BOX 1

Cocteau Twins compilations chronology
The Pink Opaque (1985)	The Box Set (1991)	BBC Sessions (1999)

Professional ratings
Review scores
Source	Rating
AllMusic	4/5 stars
NME	9/10

The Box Set (also known as Cocteau Twins Singles Collection) is a 1991 collection of EPs by the Scottish band Cocteau Twins. It features their non-album releases up until that time. It also contains a bonus disc including songs from throughout their history which have not been otherwise released on Cocteau Twins releases.

== Track listing ==
Disc one – Lullabies (1982)

1. "Feathers-Oar-Blades" – 4:32
2. "Alas Dies Laughing" – 3:40
3. "It's All But an Ark Lark" – 8:06

All Tracks by Fraser, Guthrie & Heggie

Disc two – Peppermint Pig (1983)

1. "Peppermint Pig (7" Version)" – 3:24
2. "Laugh Lines" – 3:20
3. "Hazel" – 2:49
4. "Peppermint Pig (12" Version)" – 5:02

All Tracks by Fraser, Guthrie & Heggie

Disc three – Sunburst and Snowblind (1983)

1. "Sugar Hiccup" – 3:41
2. "From the Flagstones" – 3:39
3. "Hitherto" – 3:56
4. "Because of Whirl-Jack" – 3:29

All Tracks by Fraser & Guthrie

Disc four – The Spangle Maker (1984)

1. "The Spangle Maker" – 4:42
2. "Pearly-Dewdrop's Drops (12" Version)" – 5:14
3. "Pepper-Tree" – 3:47
4. "Pearly-Dewdrop's Drops (7" Version)" – 4:11

All Tracks by Fraser, Guthrie & Raymonde

Disc five – Aikea-Guinea (1985)

1. "Aikea-Guinea" – 3:57
2. "Kookaburra" – 3:20
3. "Quisquose" – 4:10
4. "Rococo" – 3:08

All Tracks by Fraser, Guthrie & Raymonde

Disc six – Tiny Dynamine (1985)

1. "Pink Orange Red" – 4:41
2. "Ribbed and Veined" – 4:00
3. "Plain Tiger" – 4:01
4. "Sultitan Itan" – 3:53

All Tracks by Fraser, Guthrie & Raymonde

Disc seven – Echoes in a Shallow Bay (1985)

1. "Great Spangled Fritillary" – 4:02
2. "Melonella" – 4:05
3. "Pale Clouded White" – 4:59
4. "Eggs and Their Shells" – 3:06

All Tracks by Fraser, Guthrie & Raymonde

Disc eight – Love's Easy Tears (1986)

1. "Love's Easy Tears" – 3:37
2. "Those Eyes, That Mouth" – 3:38
3. "Sigh's Smell of Farewell" – 3:33
4. "Orange Appled" – 2:49

All Tracks by Fraser, Guthrie & Raymonde

Disc nine – Iceblink Luck (1990)

1. "Iceblink Luck" – 3:20
2. "Mizake The Mizan" – 3:03
3. "Watchlar" – 3:17

All Tracks by Fraser, Guthrie & Raymonde

Disc ten – Bonus disc

1. "Dials" – (Fraser, Guthrie & Raymonde) 2:39
2. "Crushed" – (Fraser, Guthrie & Raymonde) 3:17
3. "The High Monkey-Monk" – (Fraser, Guthrie & Raymonde) 3:07
4. "Oomingmak (Instrumental Version)" – (Fraser & Guthrie) 2:43

== Bonus disc notes ==
- "Dials", from the "Heaven or Las Vegas" (1990) US promo 12"/CD single.
- "Crushed", from the compilation Lonely Is an Eyesore (1987) (CAD 703).
- "The High Monkey-Monk", from the Melody Maker compilation Gigantic! II (1990) (MM RT CD002).
- "Oomingmak (Instrumental Version)", previously unreleased, but used as the outro for the Lonely Is An Eyesore video.
