= Otherness (EP) =

EP by Cocteau Twins
- Released: October 1995
- Genre: Electronica
- Length: 22:05
- Label: Fontana - CT 4
- Producer: Cocteau Twins and Mark Clifford

Cocteau Twins chronology
Twinlights (1995)	Otherness (1995)	Milk & Kisses (1996)

Professional ratings
Review scores
Source	Rating
AllMusic	3/5 stars

Otherness is a 1995 EP by Scottish alternative rock band Cocteau Twins, released in October 1995 by Fontana Records. It was issued along with Twinlights as a teaser for the full-length album Milk & Kisses. It was the group's final EP.

== Production ==
While it was a companion piece to Twinlights, it was very different in style. Otherness is a remix EP, the only such record released by the band. The remixer and collaborator was Mark Clifford from the British experimental band Seefeel. All of the EP's tracks were also featured on either previous or future releases. Both "Seekers Who Are Lovers" and "Violaine" appeared on Milk and Kisses in totally reimagined versions. "Feet-Like Fins" originally appeared on the 1986 album Victorialand, and "Cherry-Coloured Funk" originally appeared on the 1990 album Heaven or Las Vegas.

== Remaster ==
This EP and Twinlights were digitally remastered and re-released in 2005 as part of Lullabies to Violaine.

== Track listing ==
All songs written by Cocteau Twins, except "Feet Like Fins", which was written by Elizabeth Fraser and Robin Guthrie.

1. "Feet Like Fins" – 5:30
2. "Seekers Who Are Lovers" – 5:41
3. "Violaine" – 5:07
4. "Cherry-Coloured Funk" – 5:07

== Personnel ==
- Elizabeth Fraser
- Robin Guthrie
- Simon Raymonde
- Mark Clifford

== Charts ==
Chart performance for Otherness
Chart (1995)	Peak position
Scotland Singles (OCC)	55
UK Singles (OCC)	59
