= Bluebeard (song) =

Single by Cocteau Twins

from the album Four Calendar Cafe
- B-side: "Three Swept" "Ice Pulse"
- Released: February 14, 1994
- Recorded: 1993
- Studio: September Sound, London
- Genre: Dream pop
- Length: 3:57
- Label: Fontana
- Songwriters: Elizabeth Fraser; Robin Guthrie; Simon Raymonde
- Producer: Cocteau Twins

Cocteau Twins singles chronology
"Snow" (1993)	"Bluebeard" (1994)	"Tishbite" (1996)

"Bluebeard" is a single by Scottish rock band Cocteau Twins. It was released by Fontana Records in February 1994, as the second single to be released from their seventh studio album, Four-Calendar Café (1993). All three members of the band – Fraser, Guthrie and Raymonde – are credited as songwriters as well as producers.

The CD single has four tracks, including an acoustic version of the main track which did not appear on the 12". The CD was also released in the US on Capitol, the band's American label.

== Background and recording ==
Released as a single from their 1993 studio album Four Calendar Cafe, their first released with Fontana Records, "Bluebeard" marks a noticeable shift from previous Cocteau Twins releases, primarily in the form of Fraser's vocals that appear to be more understandable and less reliant on the "mouth music" approach that Fraser had adopted in previous recordings. Speaking about "Bluebeard", band member Robin Guthrie stated “Things don't influence us directly, but things do get through. To me, ‘Bluebeard’ sounds nothing like country music. It just sounds like us playing a twangy guitar. So it was really a guitar that created that song. A big guitar. It's just that if we do country it comes out sounding like Cocteau Twins. If we do anything it comes out sounding like Cocteau Twins.”

Despite becoming one of the band's best known songs of both the 1990s and their career, "Bluebeard" was recorded and released during a turbulent period for the band and its members. Guitarist Robin Guthrie was suffering an addiction problem and spent time in and out of rehab facilities and lead singer Elizabeth Fraser was suffering from episodes of nervous breakdowns and stage fright.

The song features lyrics that have been described as "dark and meaningful", a rare occurrence for the Cocteau Twins to feature such themes in their lyrics and production. The relationship between Fraser and Guthrie was deteriorating at the time of recording, and lyrics such as "Are you the right one for me? Or are you toxic for me?" seem to acknowledge the problems that existed between their relationship at the time.

== Release and promotion ==
"Bluebeard" was released in February 1993, and an accompanying music video was released to coincide with the release of the single. To promote the song, Cocteau Twins made their debut television appearance in the United States, performing the track live on The Tonight Show with Jay Leno. Following the original release, the song was digitally remastered and re-released in 2005 as part of the Lullabies to Violaine album, as well as all tracks from Bluebeard being included on the 2018 release Treasure Hiding: The Fontana Years.

Upon the single's release, it received considerable airplay on radio across Europe where it was added to various B-list playlists to be serviced on national radio broadcasts including in the United Kingdom, Portugal, Sweden and Denmark.

An acoustic version of the song was released alongside the song on the CD single release in 1993, where lead singer Elizabeth Fraser appears to curse just at the beginning. This was not cut from the final pressing of the CD single release.

== Reception ==
The song received generally positive reviews and has since become a fan favourite. Sharon O'Connell from Melody Maker wrote, "This, though, brings back the band I gave up on at the time of "Blue Bell Knoll" in one familiar, fulsome swoon of spent dreams, impossible hopes and crushed gold leaf." Fraser has previously stated that the song is one of the "darker" songs written and released by the band, and appears to reference the break-up and fragmentation in her and Guthrie's marriage. The song reached #33 on the UK Singles Chart on 26 February 1993.

== Music video ==
A music video was released to coincide with the release of the single in Europe and the United States where it received moderate play on music channels. It was directed by Paul Donnellon and produced by Nick Hirschkon for Digital Pictures. The video was released on 7 February 1994 and features computer animation and live action colliding in an under-water environment. Lead singer Elizabeth Fraser perform the song in front of multiple backdrops that change throughout the video, including a dark background with circle patterns, a red background with brown painted trees as well as a black backdrop with stars which resembles space. Band members Robin Guthrie and Simon Raymonde appear in the video, although never appearing in the same shot as Fraser. In the video, Guthrie and Raymonde play their instruments, bass and guitar, respectively.

Unlike two other Cocteau Twins music videos, "Carolyn's Fingers" and "Heaven or Las Vegas", the music video for "Bluebeard" does not appear on the official 4AD channel on Youtube as of July 2022. It is, however, available on the platform through other users, where its most popular views has over half a million views as of July 2022.

== Track listing ==
All tracks were written by the Cocteau Twins.

- 12": Fontana / CTX 2 (UK)
1. "Bluebeard" - 3:56
2. "Three Swept" - 3:37
3. "Ice-Pulse - 3:47
- CD: Fontana / CTCD 2 (UK)
1. "Bluebeard" - 3:56
2. "Three Swept" - 3:37
3. "Ice-Pulse - 3:47
4. "Bluebeard" (Acoustic) - 3:08

== Charts ==
Chart performance for "Bluebeard"
Chart (1993)	Peak position
Scotland (OCC)	77
UK Singles (OCC)	33
UK Airplay (Music Week)	39

== Performers ==
- Robin Guthrie
- Elizabeth Fraser
- Simon Raymonde

== Cover versions ==
The song was covered by Chinese singer Faye Wong in 1994 as "Random Thoughts", marking the start of a collaboration that would continue through the Asian version of Milk and Kisses and Wong's 1996 album Fu Zao to her 1997 self-titled album.
