= Peppermint Pig =

1983 song, single and EP by the Cocteau Twins

EP by Cocteau Twins
- Released: 4 April 1983
- Recorded: 1983
- Genre: Post-punk; gothic rock
- Length: 14:32
- Label: 4AD
- Producer: Alan Rankine

Cocteau Twins chronology
Lullabies (1982)	Peppermint Pig (1983)	Head over Heels (1983)

Professional ratings
Review scores
Source	Rating
AllMusic	3/5 stars
Spin Alternative Record Guide	4/10

"Peppermint Pig" is a song by Scottish alternative rock band Cocteau Twins. It was released as both a single and 12" EP on 4 April 1983 by record label 4AD. Musically, the material was similar to their previous release, the 1982 EP Lullabies. It was the last release to feature original bassist Will Heggie.

== Background ==
Peppermint Pig marked the only time that Cocteau Twins used an outside producer for one of their recordings, with production handled by Alan Rankine of Associates. The group were dissatisfied with the results. Robin Guthrie described the EP as "shit" in a 1983 interview with Sounds, claiming it was "a bad mixture—bad song, bad producer, bad band." Elizabeth Fraser simply described the material as "all we had at the time".

== Release ==
"Peppermint Pig" was originally released as a limited-edition 7-inch single, featuring two tracks, "Peppermint Pig" and "Laugh Lines". A 12-inch EP was also released, including an extended mix of "Peppermint Pig", "Laugh Lines" and a third track, "Hazel".

An alternate version of "Hazel" was recorded for a Peel session. It appeared on the band's BBC Sessions album as well as on some CD reissues of Garlands.

The Peppermint Pig EP was re-released in CD format in 1991 as part of The Box Set. It contained both mixes of the title track in addition to the other two tracks. It was also part of the 2005 Lullabies to Violaine compilation release.

== Track listing ==
=== Single ===
All tracks are written by Cocteau Twins (Elizabeth Fraser, Robin Guthrie and Will Heggie).

Side A
No.	Title	Length
1.	"Peppermint Pig"	3:24

Side B
No.	Title	Length
1.	"Laugh Lines"	3:20

=== EP ===
Side A
No.	Title	Length
1.	"Peppermint Pig"	5:02

Side B
No.	Title	Length
1.	"Laugh Lines"	3:20
2.	"Hazel"	2:49

=== CD ===
No.	Title	Length
1.	"Peppermint Pig"	3:24
2.	"Laugh Lines"	3:20
3.	"Hazel"	2:49
4.	"Peppermint Pig" (twelve-inch version)	5:02

== Personnel ==
Cocteau Twins

- Elizabeth Fraser – vocals
- Robin Guthrie – guitar, drum machine
- Will Heggie – bass guitar

Production

- Alan Rankine – production
- John Fryer – engineering
