= The Pink Opaque =

1986 compilation album by the Cocteau Twins

Compilation album by Cocteau Twins
- Released: 13 January 1986
- Recorded: 1982–1985
- Genre: Gothic rock; post-punk; ethereal wave
- Length: 40:03
- Label: 4AD; Relativity
- Producer: Cocteau Twins; Ivo Watts-Russell

Cocteau Twins chronology
Echoes in a Shallow Bay (1985)	The Pink Opaque (1986)	Victorialand (1986)

Singles from The Pink Opaque
- 1. "The Spangle Maker / Pearly-Dewdrops' Drops" Released: 2 April 1984; 2. "Aikea-Guinea" Released: 18 March 1985

Professional ratings
Review scores
Source	Rating
AllMusic	4.5/5 stars
Mojo	4/5 stars
Spin Alternative Record Guide	8/10

The Pink Opaque is a 1986 compilation album by Scottish alternative rock band Cocteau Twins, composed of tracks recorded between 1982 and 1985. A joint release by the UK-based 4AD and the American Relativity Records, it was their first official U.S. release.

== History ==
After signing to 4AD in 1982, Cocteau Twins released three albums and five EPs between the autumn of 1982 and January 1985. Despite not having American distribution, the band gained popularity there through college radio, particularly with the 1984 single "Pearly-Dewdrops' Drops". The American label Relativity Records distributed their albums on license from 4AD. Rather than reissuing all of the band's releases to that point, it was decided that the compilation The Pink Opaque would be issued instead, as a sampler of the Twins' output up through early 1985.

The Pink Opaque is also significant in 4AD's history, as it was the label's first CD release.

== Track listing ==
1. "The Spangle Maker" (4:40) — from The Spangle Maker (12"), 1984
2. "Millimillenary" (3:40) — from NME compilation Department of Enjoyment (cassette), 1984
3. "Wax and Wane" (3:51) — (remixed) from Garlands (album), 1982
4. "Hitherto" (3:51) — from Sunburst and Snowblind (EP), 1983
5. "Pearly-Dewdrops' Drops" (4:10) — from Pearly-Dewdrops' Drops (7"), 1984 and The Spangle Maker (12"), 1984
6. "From the Flagstones" (3:40) — from Sunburst and Snowblind (EP), 1983
7. "Aikea-Guinea" (3:56) — from Aikea-Guinea (EP), 1985
8. "Lorelei" (3:42) — from Treasure (album), 1984
9. "Pepper-Tree" (3:57) — from The Spangle Maker (12"), 1984
10. "Musette and Drums" (4:36) — from Head over Heels (album), 1983

== Personnel ==
- Elizabeth Fraser sang and Robin Guthrie played guitar on all tracks.
- Bass guitar by Will Heggie on track 3; by Guthrie on tracks 4, 6 and 10; and by Simon Raymonde on all other tracks.
- As on all Cocteau Twins releases, a drum machine was used for percussion.
- The band were credited as producers on all tracks, except for "Wax and Wane", where Ivo Watts-Russell was credited as co-producer.
