= Lullabies (EP) =

1982 EP by the Cocteau Twins

EP by Cocteau Twins
- Released: October 1982
- Recorded: Palladium Studios, Edinburgh, Scotland
- Genres: Post-punk; gothic rock
- Length: 16:14
- Label: 4AD
- Producer: Ivo (A.K.A. Ivo Watts-Russell)

Cocteau Twins chronology
Garlands (1982)	Lullabies (1982)	Peppermint Pig (1983)

Professional ratings
Review scores
Source	Rating
AllMusic	3/5 stars
Spin Alternative Record Guide	4/10

Lullabies is the first EP by Scottish rock band Cocteau Twins. It was released in October 1982, following their debut album, Garlands. The EP contained three non-album tracks, and featured a louder and more driving sound than the album.

== Background ==
Lullabies was recorded at Palladium Studios in Edinburgh, Scotland and was mixed at Blackwing Studios in London. Earlier versions of the songs "Alas Dies Laughing" and "Feathers Oar-Blades" recorded for the BBC had been premiered in a John Peel session in June 1982.

== Release ==
Lullabies was released in October 1982.

The EP was reissued in 1991 as part of The Box Set, and again in 2005 as part of the Lullabies to Violaine compilation. Alternate versions of "Feathers-Oar-Blades" and "Alas Dies Laughing" were included on the Cocteau Twins' BBC Sessions release.

== Critical reception ==
The record was reviewed NME's Lynden Barber with the remark: "All you need to know about the Cocteau Twins is that they make “Siouxsie & The Banshees” records. OK?"

== Track listing ==
All tracks are written by Cocteau Twins (Elizabeth Fraser, Robin Guthrie, Will Heggie).

No.	Title	Length
1.	"Feathers-Oar-Blades"	4:31
2.	"Alas Dies Laughing"	3:39
3.	"It's All But an Ark Lark"	8:04

== Personnel ==
Cocteau Twins

- Elizabeth Fraser – vocals
- Robin Guthrie – guitar, drum machine
- Will Heggie – bass guitar

Production

- Ivo Watts-Russell – production
- John Fryer – engineering
- John Turner – engineering
