= The Moon and the Melodies =

1986 album by Harold Budd and members of Cocteau Twins

Studio album by Harold Budd and Cocteau Twins
- Released: 10 November 1986
- Genres: Ambient; dream pop
- Length: 37:20
- Label: 4AD
- Producers: Harold Budd, Elizabeth Fraser, Robin Guthrie, Simon Raymonde

Cocteau Twins chronology
| Love's Easy Tears (1986) | The Moon and the Melodies (1986) | Blue Bell Knoll (1988) |

Harold Budd chronology
| Lovely Thunder (1986) | The Moon and the Melodies (1986) | Myths 3: La Nouvelle Serenite (1987) |

Professional ratings
Review scores
| Source | Rating |
|---|---|
| AllMusic | 3.5/5 stars |
| PopMatters | 7/10 |

The Moon and the Melodies is a collaborative studio album by Scottish dream pop band Cocteau Twins and American minimalist composer Harold Budd. It was released 10 November 1986 by 4AD. The name "Cocteau Twins" did not appear on the release, which instead credited the band's three members (Elizabeth Fraser, Robin Guthrie and Simon Raymonde) and Budd individually.

== Background and recording ==
The project emerged from a proposed television series intended to promote cross-genre musical collaborations, which ultimately did not materialise. Inspired by the idea, Cocteau Twins members Robin Guthrie and Simon Raymonde contacted Harold Budd to initiate a collaboration. Budd, known for his ambient work and partnerships with Brian Eno, had not previously collaborated with artists from pop music genres. The age and stylistic gap between Budd and Cocteau Twins contributed to the uniqueness of the project.

Earlier in 1986, Cocteau Twins had released Victorialand, a duo project by Guthrie and Fraser, while Raymonde was working with This Mortal Coil. His return for the collaboration with Budd marked a reconsolidation of the group. Budd's musical background included cool jazz in the 1950s and avant-garde experimentalism influenced by John Cage and Morton Feldman. Cocteau Twins, meanwhile, had developed a distinctive sound characterised by treated guitars, atmospheric textures, and Fraser's abstract vocals. The band had previously met Brian Eno in 1984, indicating a shared interest in ambient aesthetics. Simon Raymonde later described the recording as "a moment in time between friends that are enjoying making music together".

== Musical style ==
The Moon and the Melodies blends ambient and dream pop elements, combining Budd's minimal piano compositions with Cocteau Twins' textural instrumentation and vocals. The album is primarily instrumental, with four of its eight tracks featuring vocals by Elizabeth Fraser. Budd's signature use of reverb and sustain defines much of the sonic palette, while Guthrie's guitars and Raymonde’s bass add a shimmering quality.

The album features contributions from Richard Thomas of Dif Juz on saxophone. The saxophone parts have been described as "quietly sobering" and contribute to the dreamlike tone of the album. The lyrics are characteristically abstract and often unintelligible.

== Track listing ==
All tracks are written by Elizabeth Fraser, Robin Guthrie, Simon Raymonde and Harold Budd.

| No. | Title | Length |
|---|---|---|
| 1. | "Sea, Swallow Me" | 3:09 |
| 2. | "Memory Gongs" | 7:27 |
| 3. | "Why Do You Love Me?" | 4:51 |
| 4. | "Eyes Are Mosaics" | 4:09 |
| 5. | "She Will Destroy You" | 4:17 |
| 6. | "The Ghost Has No Home" | 7:35 |
| 7. | "Bloody and Blunt" | 2:13 |
| 8. | "Ooze Out and Away, Onehow" | 3:41 |
| Total length: | | 37:24 |

== Personnel ==
- Harold Budd – piano
- Elizabeth Fraser – vocals
- Robin Guthrie – guitar
- Simon Raymonde – bass guitar

Additional personnel

- Richard Thomas – saxophone, drums
