= Tiny Dynamine =

EP by Cocteau Twins
- Released: 15 November 1985 (UK)
- Genre: Ethereal wave
- Length: 16:28
- Label: 4AD
- Producer: Cocteau Twins

Cocteau Twins chronology
Aikea-Guinea (1985)	Tiny Dynamine (1985)	Echoes in a Shallow Bay (1985)

CD cover
- combines both EPs

Professional ratings
Review scores
Source	Rating
AllMusic	4/5 stars
Spin Alternative Record Guide	6/10

Tiny Dynamine is an EP by Scottish alternative rock band Cocteau Twins, released on 4AD Records. The EP featured four non-album tracks. It was issued on 15 November 1985, two weeks prior to another EP, Echoes in a Shallow Bay. The two EP sets, which featured complementary artwork, were also released as a combined double EP in a gatefold cover and as an eight-track CD. The EP was later included in its entirety on the 1991 compilation The Box Set and the 2005 singles/EP collection Lullabies to Violaine.

== Release details ==
The band did not originally intend to release these songs to the general public, presumably explaining the decision to release the material on EPs, rather than as what would have been their fourth album. The tracks on Tiny Dynamine and Echoes in a Shallow Bay were initially recorded to test the production capacities of a new studio. When the band decided the material was strong enough for release, they completed the recording process and issued the finished product on two EPs.

"It’s the best-sounding record we’ve ever made, technically and everything," Guthrie explained. "If you play it, it sounds good. We’re learning to make records that sound better when you put them on. These records make me happy.”

"Pink Orange Red" and "Plain Tiger" were performed live. An acoustic version of "Pink Orange Red" appeared on the 1995 EP Twinlights, and a remastered version appeared on the 2000 compilation Stars and Topsoil.

Many of the titles on the two EPs seem to have some link with Lepidoptera (butterflies and moths). Most are obscure, but the dynamine is a genus of nymphalid butterflies found in South America, the plain tiger is a common Asian butterfly and the lyrics to "Melonella" (on Echoes In A Shallow Bay) are simply a recounting of various Lepidopteric family names such as Hesperiidae and Papilionidae.

== Track listing ==
All songs written by Cocteau Twins.

=== 12": 4AD / BAD 510 (UK) ===
1. "Pink Orange Red" – 4:41
2. "Ribbed and Veined" – 4:00
3. "Plain Tiger" – 4:01
4. "Sultitan Itan" – 3:53

=== CD: 4AD / BAD 510 CD (UK) ===
1. "Pink Orange Red" – 4:41
2. "Ribbed and Veined" – 4:00
3. "Plain Tiger" – 4:01
4. "Sultitan Itan" – 3:53
5. "Great Spangled Fritillary" – 4:02
6. "Melonella" – 4:05
7. "Pale Clouded White" – 4:59
8. "Eggs and Their Shells" – 3:06
- Tracks 5–8 from Echoes in a Shallow Bay EP

== Personnel ==
- Elizabeth Fraser – vocals
- Robin Guthrie – guitar
- Simon Raymonde – bass guitar

== Charts ==
Chart performance for Tiny Dynamine
Chart (1985)	Peak position
UK Singles (OCC)	52
UK Indie	1

== Release notes ==
- Produced by Cocteau Twins. All tracks written by Cocteau Twins.
- Recorded at Guerilla, London.
- Mixed at Aosis, London, by Robin Guthrie, studio engineer Matt Wallis.
- Tiny Dynamine was re-released in November, 1985 on a combined disc with Echoes In A Shallow Bay under 4AD catalog designation CAD 510/511.
- A live performance of "Pink Orange Red" was recorded for SNUB-TV in the UK in 1985.
- An acoustic version of "Pink Orange Red" appears on the 1995 EP Twinlights.
- Re-released in 1991 as part of The Box Set.
- A remastered version of "Pink Orange Red" appears on the 2000 compilation Stars and Topsoil.
- Digitally remastered and re-released in 2005 as part of Lullabies to Violaine.
- "Pink Orange Red" and "Plain Tiger" have appeared in live performances.
- Sleeve design by 23 Envelope.
