= Pearly-Dewdrops' Drops =

1984 single by the Cocteau Twins

Single by Cocteau Twins

from the album The Spangle Maker
- Released: 2 April 1984
- Recorded: Rooster Studios, London
- Genre: Dream pop; ethereal wave
- Length: 4:12
- Label: 4AD - BAD405
- Songwriters: Elizabeth Fraser; Robin Guthrie; Simon Raymonde

Cocteau Twins singles chronology
"Sunburst and Snowblind" (1983)	"Pearly-Dewdrops' Drops" (1984)	"Aikea-Guinea" (1985)

"Pearly-Dewdrops' Drops" is a single by Scottish band Cocteau Twins, taken from their 1984 EP The Spangle Maker. The song was written by Cocteau Twins, and recorded at Rooster Studios in London. It was their highest-charting single, peaking at No. 29 on the UK Singles Chart and No. 1 on the UK Indie Chart. The lyrics are "as nonsensical as they are indistinguishable" but "Elizabeth Fraser's reverb-heavy soprano" carries the song just the same. The title may be a reference to A Midsummer Night's Dream, whose fairies announce their mission as, "I must go seek some dew-drops here And hang a pearl in every cowslip's ear. Farewell, thou lob of spirits: I'll be gone; Our queen and all her elves come here anon."

== Release and promotion ==
During the song's early weeks of release, it quickly become a prominent feature on European radio stations. In the United Kingdom, across all BBC radio stations and other broadcasters such as Capital Radio, "Pearly-Dewdrops' Drops" was the 12th most frequently played song on British radio stations.

In the week of May 14, 1984, "Pearly-Dewdrops' Drops" debuted at No. 53 on the European Airplay Top 60 chart, a chart compiled across Europe based on information received from individual European countries relating to radio airplay.

== Music video ==
A music video for the song, directed by John Scarlett-Davis, was filmed at The Chapel in Holloway Sanatorium in Virginia Water, and in nearby Virginia Waters Park.

The music video was released and serviced to European television channels for broadcast. On the European continent itself, the music video received minimal airplay. However, in the United Kingdom, the music video for the song received considerable broadcast time. On the European music channel Music Box, the video was ranked amongst the top ten videos to be played in May 1984.

== In popular culture ==
The song was used on the soundtrack of the 2012 film The Perks of Being a Wallflower.

The song was used in the final scene of the 2021 Netflix miniseries Halston.

It is also used in Season 3 of The Bear on FX.

== Charts ==
Chart (1984)	Peak position
UK Singles (Official Charts)	29
UK Indie (Official Charts)	1
European Singles (European Hot 100 Singles)	68
