= Twinlights =

EP by Cocteau Twins
- Released: September 1995
- Genre: Acoustic rock
- Length: 13:55
- Label: Fontana
- Producer: Cocteau Twins

Cocteau Twins chronology
Four-Calendar Café (1993)	Twinlights (1995)	Otherness (1995)

Professional ratings
Review scores
Source	Rating
AllMusic	3/5 stars

Twinlights is a 1995 EP by Scottish alternative rock band Cocteau Twins, released in September 1995 by Fontana Records.

== Background ==
It was issued along with the EP Otherness as a teaser for the album Milk & Kisses. It is a mainly acoustic recording, with AllMusic referring to it as "being as close to an "unplugged" effort as the Twins ever got". The EP was originally released on CD as well as a 2x7" vinyl set.

The EP has four tracks, two of which were reimagined for Milk and Kisses ("Rilkean Heart" and "Half-Gifts"). "Pink Orange Red", which was released on the 1985 EP Tiny Dynamine, is a stripped-down version of the original with a piano playing the melody and opening. "Golden-Vein" is the only track on the EP not to appear on any other release.

Vocalist Elizabeth Fraser described the EP as being about a man she fell in love with during the 1994 Four-Calendar Cafe tour. The mystery man has been speculated to be Jeff Buckley by Fraser's biographer, but she has never confirmed or denied this.

== Track listing ==
All songs written by Cocteau Twins; string arrangements by Thomas M. Hill.

1. "Rilkean Heart" – 2:22
2. "Golden-Vein" – 2:49
3. "Pink Orange Red" – 4:29
4. "Half-Gifts" – 4:15

== Personnel ==
=== Cocteau Twins ===
- Elizabeth Fraser
- Robin Guthrie
- Simon Raymonde

=== Additional musicians ===
- Phil Boyden – violin
- Paul Costin – violin
- Fiona Griffith – viola
- Helen Thomas – cello

== Charts ==
Chart performance for Twinlights
Chart (1995)	Peak position
UK Singles (OCC)	59
Scotland Singles (OCC)	57
