= Echoes in a Shallow Bay =

EP by Cocteau Twins
- Released: 29 November 1985
- Genre: Ethereal wave
- Length: 16:12
- Label: 4AD
- Producer: Cocteau Twins

Cocteau Twins chronology
Tiny Dynamine (1985)	Echoes in a Shallow Bay (1985)	The Pink Opaque (1986)

Professional ratings
Review scores
Source	Rating
AllMusic	4/5 stars
Spin Alternative Record Guide	6/10

Echoes in a Shallow Bay is an EP by Scottish alternative rock band Cocteau Twins, released on 4AD. The EP featured four non-album tracks. It was issued on 29 November 1985, two weeks after another EP, Tiny Dynamine. The two EP sets, which featured complementary artwork, were also released as a combined double EP in a gatefold cover, and as an eight-track CD. The EP was reissued in 1991 as part of The Box Set and in 2005 as part of the singles/EP collection Lullabies to Violaine. A new vinyl version, sourced from digital files created from a new transfer of the original analogue tapes, was released in 2015, combined with the Tiny Dynamine EP.

== Background ==
The band did not originally intend to release these songs to the general public, presumably explaining the decision to release the material on EPs, rather than as what would have been their fourth album. The tracks on Tiny Dynamine and Echoes in a Shallow Bay were initially recorded to test the production capacities of a new studio. When the band decided the material was strong enough for release, they completed the recording process and issued the finished product on two EPs.

"Pale Clouded White" was performed live. A remastered version of the song appeared on the 2000 compilation Stars and Topsoil.

Several of the titles on the two EPs have some link with Lepidoptera (butterflies and moths). The great spangled fritillary is a butterfly, and while there is no pale clouded white, there is a pale clouded yellow (as well as several groups of butterflies commonly known as whites), while mellonella is the specific name of the wax moth Galleria mellonella. The lyrics of this track consist of Fraser reciting the scientific names of the families of British moths. Lepidoptera eggs do not have shells, though.

== Track listing ==
All songs written by Cocteau Twins.

1. "Great Spangled Fritillary" – 4:02
2. "Melonella" – 4:05
3. "Pale Clouded White" – 4:59
4. "Eggs and Their Shells" – 3:06

== Personnel ==
- Elizabeth Fraser – vocals
- Robin Guthrie – guitar
- Simon Raymonde – bass guitar

Produced by Cocteau Twins.

== Charts ==
Chart performance for Echoes in a Shallow Bay
Chart (1985)	Peak position
New Zealand (Recorded Music NZ)	48
UK Singles (Official Charts)	65
UK Indie	1
