= Snow (single) =

Single by Cocteau Twins
- Released: December 1993
- Studio: September Sound, London
- Genre: Dream pop
- Length: 5:45
- Label: Fontana
- Producer: Cocteau Twins

Cocteau Twins singles chronology
"Evangeline" (1993)	"Snow" (1993)	"Bluebeard" (1994)

Snow is a 1993 single released by Scottish band Cocteau Twins, released in December 1993 on Fontana Records. It contains cover versions of the Christmas standards "Frosty the Snowman" and "Winter Wonderland". It is out of print, though its tracks appear on the compilation Lullabies to Violaine.

== Background ==
Snow was released in extremely limited quantities; one expert suggested that fewer than 5,000 copies were made. One of the songs, "Frosty the Snowman," was recorded more than a year before Snow's release, for an album to accompany a year-end issue of Volume. Robin Guthrie was reluctant to record Christmas songs, so the group opted to record non-specific winter songs instead.

== Critical reception ==
Professional ratings
Review scores
Source	Rating
AllMusic	3/5 stars

Snow received fairly positive reviews from contemporary music critics despite its limited release. AllMusic's Ned Raggett called the EP "perfectly enjoyable," noted its calmness and praised Elizabeth Fraser's vocal performance. Hybrid Magazine's Tom Topkoff noted that the songs sounded similar to the group's non-holiday songs and declared that the album was "sure to bring you joy during each holiday season." Everett True from Melody Maker wrote, "What's truly magical is the second track, "Frosty the Snowman", done in the style of the old Cocteaus (ie: you can't work out what the f*** Liz is singing about, and furthermore you don't care)." Pitchfork named Cocteau Twins’ "Frosty the Snowman" the 36th best holiday song of all time.

== Track listing ==
Adapted from Discogs and AllMusic.

1. "Winter Wonderland" (Felix Bernard, Dick Smith) – 2:50
2. "Frosty the Snowman" (Steve Nelson, Jack Rollins) – 2:55

== Personnel ==
Adapted from AllMusic.

- Elizabeth Fraser – vocals
- Robin Guthrie – guitar
- Simon Raymonde – bass guitar
- Lifeboat Matey – image processing
- Lincoln Fong – additional engineering
- Andy Earl – photography
- Cocteau Twins – producer

== Charts ==
Chart performance for "Winter Wonderland/Frosty the Snowman"
Chart (1993)	Peak position
UK Singles (OCC)	58
