= Garlands (album) =

1982 album by the Cocteau Twins

Studio album by Cocteau Twins
- Released: 10 July 1982
- Recorded: 1981–1982
- Studios: Blackwing Studios, London, England
- Genres: Gothic rock; ethereal wave; post-punk
- Length: 35:09
- Label: 4AD
- Producers: Cocteau Twins; Ivo Watts-Russell

Cocteau Twins chronology
Garlands (1982)	Lullabies (1982)

Garlands is the debut album by the Scottish rock band Cocteau Twins. It was released on 10 July 1982 through the record label 4AD. It peaked in the Top 5 of the UK Independent Albums Chart and received support from BBC Radio 1 radio host John Peel.

== Background ==
Garlands is the only full-length album that Cocteau Twins recorded with original bassist Will Heggie. Prior to the album, the band recorded a four-track session for John Peel in June 1982 including "Wax and Wane", "Garlands" and two songs that would appear on their subsequent Lullabies EP. A second Peel Session in January 1983, including a version of "Blind Dumb Deaf", was later included as bonus tracks on the cassette and CD releases of Garlands. Gordon Sharp of Cindytalk provided backing vocals on "Dear Heart", "Hearsay Please" and "Hazel".

== Music ==
Martin C. Strong noted that the album was "hastily recorded" but featured an "interesting fusion of monochromatic rhythms, textured guitar distortion, and early sampling technology." Guitarist Robin Guthrie was unhappy about the recording of the album, stating in an interview for Penny Black Music in 2006:

There was a lot about "Garlands" that we were really, really unhappy with. One of the things we had done on the demo—and used to do playing live—was put our drum box through fuzz pedals and guitar amps, so that it came out sounding really mashed up, which was what the hip-hop guys came up with a couple of years later. When we got to the studio there were all these technicians who were like ‘Oh no, you can’t do this stuff.’ We felt really intimidated. They wouldn’t let us touch any of their stuff. It was like we were wee boys and they were grown-ups. We were like ‘You set up the drum machine like that’ and they were like, ‘Oh no! You can’t do that. It’s going into the red.’ The drums as a result came out sounding clean and drum-machine pristine. It was disappointing.

The album's sound was described in The Rough Guide to Rock as "a blend of ominous pulsating bass, stark TR808 drums, cyclical guitar and great screeching arcs of reverberating feedback, over which Liz alternated dry, brittle utterings with full-power vocal gymnastics." Billboard described the album as "dark post-punk." The Arts Desk noted that "though they had their own voice, the debut's debt to Siouxsie and the Banshees was apparent."

== Release and artwork ==
Garlands was released as a vinyl LP by 4AD on 10 July 1982. The album cover was designed by Nigel Grierson as part of a college project to draft alternative covers for The Scream by Siouxsie and the Banshees. Lyrics from "But I'm Not", "Shallow Then Halo", "Garlands" and "Grail Overfloweth" appear on the inner sleeve.

The original British cassette release includes four additional tracks from a John Peel Session. The original British, Brazilian and Canadian cassette and CD releases feature the album, the Peel Session and two other tracks that were recorded for an unreleased single, which was to have been the band's first release. The four Peel Session recordings were later released on BBC Sessions in 1999.

A remastered version of "Blind Dumb Deaf" is included on the 2000 compilation Stars and Topsoil, a version of "Hazel" appears on the band's 1983 Peppermint Pig EP and a remixed version of "Wax and Wane" is included on the 1985 compilation The Pink Opaque.

Garlands was remastered and rereleased by 4AD in 2003. It was rereleased on vinyl as part of a box set in 2010 and as an LP with the original cover artwork in 2020.

== Reception and legacy ==
Professional ratings
Review scores
Source	Rating
AllMusic	2/5 stars
Rolling Stone	3/5 stars
Martin C. Strong	7/10
Spin Alternative Record Guide	4/10
Uncut	3/5 stars
Under the Radar	9/10

Although it was Cocteau Twins' first record, by 2 August 1982 Garlands had reached number 14 on the UK Indie Albums chart. Sounds journalist Helen Fitzgerald wrote: "A fluid frieze of wispy images made all the more haunting by Elizabeth's distilled vocal maturity, fluctuating from a brittle fragility to a voluble dexterity with full range and power."

However, the band's roadie Collin Wallace recalled that "Garlands was written off in the UK as another Siouxsie copy band, and Elisabeth [Fraser] was a huge Siouxsie fan." Spin wrote that the album "[sounds] like Siouxsie and the Banshees with echo and smeared mascara." In its review of the album, AllMusic was generally critical, writing that "Garlands falters due to something the band generally avoided in the future – overt repetition. [...] As a debut effort, though, Garlands makes its own curious mark, preparing the band for greater heights".

In a positive 2020 review, Dom Gourley of Under the Radar stated that the album "represented a year zero for alternative guitar music," adding that "songs like 'Wax and Wane' and 'But I’m Not' undoubtedly influenced a generation of effects pedalled guitar slingers decades on." In 2021, Mark Clifford of Seefeel praised the album's production and use of drum-machine backing: "I don’t think they get credited enough for that. Garlands, it’s basically electronic beats with noise on top."

== Track listing ==
All tracks are written by Cocteau Twins (Elizabeth Fraser, Robin Guthrie and Will Heggie).

No.	Title	Length
1.	"Blood Bitch"	4:34
2.	"Wax and Wane"	4:02
3.	"But I'm Not"	2:42
4.	"Blind Dumb Deaf"	3:45
5.	"Shallow Then Halo" (printed as "Shallow Then Hallo" on the sleeve)	5:14
6.	"The Hollow Men"	5:00
7.	"Garlands"	4:30
8.	"Grail Overfloweth"	5:22

Bonus tracks
No.	Title	Length
9.	"Dear Heart" (John Peel Session January 1983)	3:38
10.	"Hearsay Please" (John Peel Session January 1983)	4:23
11.	"Hazel" (John Peel Session January 1983)	3:23
12.	"Blind Dumb Deaf" (John Peel Session January 1983)	3:42
13.	"Speak No Evil"	3:53
14.	"Perhaps Some Other Aeon"	2:57

== Personnel ==
Cocteau Twins

- Elizabeth Fraser – vocals, production
- Robin Guthrie – guitar, drum machine, production
- Will Heggie – bass guitar, production

with:

- Gordon Sharp – backing vocals on "Dear Heart" and "Hazel"

Technical

- Ivo Watts-Russell – production
- Eric Radcliffe – engineering at Blackwing Studios
- John Fryer – engineering at Blackwing Studios
- 23 Envelope – sleeve design, photography and art direction
