= Four-Calendar Café =

Studio album by Cocteau Twins
- Released: 18 October 1993
- Recorded: 1993
- Studio: September Sound, London
- Genre: Dream pop
- Length: 41:23
- Label: Fontana
- Producer: Cocteau Twins

Cocteau Twins chronology
Heaven or Las Vegas (1990)	Four-Calendar Café (1993)	Twinlights (1995)

Singles from Four-Calendar Café
- 1. "Evangeline" Released: 20 September 1993; 2. "Bluebeard" Released: 7 February 1994

Four-Calendar Café is the seventh studio album by Scottish band Cocteau Twins, released on 18 October 1993 by Fontana Records. It was their first release since leaving their former record label 4AD. Two singles were released to promote the album, "Evangeline" (September 1993) and "Bluebeard" (February 1994). A performance to promote "Bluebeard" on The Tonight Show with Jay Leno marked their debut performance on American television.

== Background ==
Fraser and Guthrie ended their 13-year relationship in 1993. The band explained that Four-Calendar Café was a response to the turmoil that had engulfed them in that period, with Guthrie entering rehab and quitting alcohol and drugs, and Fraser undergoing psychotherapy.

The album distinguishes itself as one of the group's more direct and pop-oriented releases, with vocalist Elizabeth Fraser's lyrics more intelligible than usual. Guthrie claimed "I’ve consciously been stripping things back. In the past, I’ve always wanted one more overdub, one more melody, because I’m terrible for thinking that my music isn’t good enough. So if I put in a few more frilly overdubs, then it’ll be all right. These ones are more substantial. The ideas are more focused". Fraser said "I tend to go from one extreme to the other. To go from an album like ‘Blue Bell Knoll,’ which is so heavily disguised and removed from reality to ‘Heaven or Las Vegas,’ or even more to this one, where everything on it is in English and it's all audible...it is extreme, I think. But it seems important for me to do that".

Raymonde later spoke highly of the album, claiming that "I think it’s an amazing record, and I think people will probably realise that many, many years in the future. It was such a departure from what we’d done before. And the fact that it wasn’t on 4AD, and the fact that we’d jumped ship and we were on the other side, with the enemy, on a major label, I think people were sort of like, ‘Oh, that can’t be any good.’ But I think in time people will realise what a great album ‘Four-Calendar Café’ is. Because I think it's beautiful".

== Release and promotion ==
The album took its title from William Least Heat-Moon's book Blue Highways, in which the author considers the quality of a restaurant by how many calendars it has hanging on its wall. The cover image was taken by Walter Wick, who is known for his photography for the children's book series I Spy.

Four-Calendar Café was released on 18 October 1993 by Fontana Records, their first album since leaving record label 4AD, under which their previous studio album, Heaven or Las Vegas (1990), was released. Two singles were released from the album — "Evangeline" as the lead single on 20 September 1993, and "Bluebeard" as the second and final single on 14 February 1994. To promote the album, Robin Guthrie appeared on MTV's 120 Minutes, marking the first television interview by a member of the band in the United States. As part of the promotion, the band performed "Bluebeard" on The Tonight Show with Jay Leno.

"Evangeline" was a moderate hit in several countries. "Bluebeard" was a moderate success on the United States modern charts.

=== Critical response ===
Professional ratings
Review scores
Source	Rating
AllMusic	3/5 stars
Encyclopedia of Popular Music	3/5 stars
Entertainment Weekly	A−
Music Week	4/5 stars
NME	8/10
Philadelphia Inquirer	2.5/4 stars
Pitchfork	8.1/10
Q	4/5 stars
Rolling Stone	3/5 stars
Select	3/5 medals

Upon its release, the album received generally positive reviews from music critics. AllMusic said "Four-Calendar Café is also, tellingly, their most earthbound effort; as with Heaven or Las Vegas, the emphasis here is on substance as much as style -- "Evangeline," "Bluebeard," and "Know Who You Are at Every Age" continue the trio's advance into more accessible melodic and lyrical ground without sacrificing even an ounce of their trademark ethereality". Pitchfork commented on the album saying "Four-Calendar Café is full of trauma’s echoes".

NME named it the 46th best record of 1993.

=== Commercial ===
In the United Kingdom, the album debuted at number thirteen on the UK Albums Charts on week ending 24 October 1993, spending a total of three weeks within the UK Top 100 Albums Charts. In the United States, it debuted at number seventy-eight on the US Billboard 200 charts, spending a total of three weeks within the top 200. As of 1996, it had sold 146,000 copies in the U.S. according to Nielsen SoundScan.

It also spent three weeks within the albums chart in New Zealand, following a peak position of number twenty-two, and also reached number forty-five on the European Top 100 Albums charts.

== Track listing ==
All songs written by Cocteau Twins.

1. "Know Who You Are at Every Age" – 3:42
2. "Evangeline" – 4:31
3. "Bluebeard" – 3:56
4. "Theft, and Wandering Around Lost" – 4:30
5. "Oil of Angels" – 4:38
6. "Squeeze-Wax" – 3:49
7. "My Truth" – 4:34
8. "Essence" – 3:02
9. "Summerhead" – 3:39
10. "Pur" – 5:02

== Personnel ==
- Elizabeth Fraser - vocals
- Robin Guthrie - guitar
- Simon Raymonde - bass

Additional personnel

- Lincoln Fong - additional engineering

== Cover versions ==
The songs "Bluebeard" and "Know Who You Are at Every Age" were covered by Cantopop artist Faye Wong for her 1994 album Wu Si Lyun Seung or Random Thoughts. "Bluebeard" was renamed to become the album's title track, and "Know Who You Are at Every Age" became "Ji Gei Ji Bei" (or "Know Yourself and Each Other"). Wong's cover version of "Bluebeard" was featured in the film Chungking Express, in which she also starred.

== Charts ==
Chart performance for Four-Calendar Café
Chart (1993)	Peak position
Australian Albums (ARIA)	111
European Albums (Music & Media)	45
New Zealand Albums (RMNZ)	22
UK Albums (OCC)	13
US Billboard 200	78
