= Aikea-Guinea =

EP by Cocteau Twins
- Released: 18 March 1985
- Genre: Ethereal wave
- Length: 14:34
- Label: 4AD
- Producer: Cocteau Twins

Cocteau Twins chronology
Treasure (1984)	Aikea-Guinea (1985)	Tiny Dynamine (1985)

Professional ratings
Review scores
Source	Rating
AllMusic	3/5 stars
Spin Alternative Record Guide	7/10

Aikea-Guinea is a March 1985 7" single and 12" EP by Scottish dream pop band Cocteau Twins, released on 4AD. The 7" featured two non-album tracks, while the EP added two more.

== Release ==
Aikea-Guinea was included as a bonus with some Canadian pressings of Treasure. The title track also appears on the compilation The Pink Opaque (1985), and a remastered version appears on Stars and Topsoil (2000). On the 7", the song "Kookaburra" has a short percussive introduction that is not present on the EP. The EP was reissued in 1991 as part of The Box Set and again in 2005 as part of the Lullabies to Violaine compilation, this time with a remixed "alternate" version of the title track.

== Meaning of the title ==
According to Robin Guthrie, the word "aikea-guinea" is a Scottish colloquialism for a seashell.

== Track listing ==
All songs written and produced by Cocteau Twins.

1. "Aikea-Guinea" – 3:57
2. "Kookaburra" – 3:19
3. "Quisquose" – 4:10 (EP only)
4. "Rococo" – 3:08 (EP only)

== Personnel ==
- Elizabeth Fraser – vocals
- Robin Guthrie – guitar
- Simon Raymonde – bass

== Charts ==
Chart performance for Aikea-Guinea
Chart (1985)	Peak position
New Zealand (Recorded Music NZ)	38
UK Singles (OCC)	41
UK Indie	1
