= Iceblink Luck =

1990 single by the Cocteau Twins

Single by Cocteau Twins

from the album Heaven or Las Vegas
- Released: 27 August 1990
- Recorded: September Sound, London
- Genre: Dream pop
- Length: 3:18
- Label: 4AD
- Songwriter: Cocteau Twins
- Producer: Cocteau Twins

Cocteau Twins singles chronology
"Love's Easy Tears" (1986)	"Iceblink Luck" (1990)	"Evangeline" (1993)

Professional ratings
Review scores
Source	Rating
AllMusic	3/5 stars

"Iceblink Luck" is a single by Scottish band Cocteau Twins, released by 4AD Records in August 1990. It was the first single from the Heaven or Las Vegas album and the band's first single to be released in the United States. It was the band's second single to reach the Top 40 in the UK Singles Chart, peaking at No. 38. The single was a moderate success in Europe, debuting at No. 43 on the European Airplay Chart as well as at No. 91 on the European Hot 100 Singles chart.

Featuring a more accessible, intelligible sound that AllMusic described as "almost a rave-up", the single managed to achieve airplay on the UK's national radio, and the album proved to be the band's highest-charting release in the UK.

Upon its release, "Iceblink Luck" received favourable airplay on national radio stations, including in the United Kingdom and Switzerland where it was added to several radio stations B-list playlists, and in the Netherlands where it was ranked amongst the Top 5 "power play" tracks on national radio.

The song was listed in the musical reference book 1001 Songs You Must Hear Before You Die.

== Music video ==
A promotional video was made for the song, which also received attention on MTV. It begins with a set of swirling bright red lights on a dark background. Elizabeth Fraser appears in black and white singing with her hands behind her back against a backdrop of blue, and the two other band members play their instruments among a mass of bright lights.

== Track listing ==
All tracks written by Cocteau Twins

1. "Iceblink Luck" – 3:17
2. "Mizake the Mizan" – 3:02
3. "Watchlar" – 3:18

== Performers ==
- Robin Guthrie
- Elizabeth Fraser
- Simon Raymonde

== Charts ==
Chart performance for "Iceblink Luck"
Chart (1990)	Peak position
Europe (Eurochart Hot 100)	91
UK Singles (Official Charts)	38
US Alternative Airplay (Billboard)	4
