= Head over Heels (Cocteau Twins album) =

1983 album by Cocteau Twins

Studio album by Cocteau Twins
- Released: 24 October 1983
- Recorded: 1983
- Studios: Palladium Studios, Edinburgh, Scotland
- Genres: Gothic rock; ethereal wave; post-punk
- Length: 37:01
- Label: 4AD
- Producer: Cocteau Twins

Cocteau Twins chronology
Peppermint Pig (1983)	Head over Heels (1983)	Sunburst and Snowblind (1983)

Alternative cover
- Alternative cover

Head over Heels is the second studio album by the Scottish rock band Cocteau Twins. The album was released on 24 October 1983 through the label 4AD. It featured the band's signature sound of "Guthrie's lush guitars under Fraser's mostly wordless vocals" and is considered an archetype of early ethereal wave music.

== Background ==
Following their 1982 debut album Garlands, two EPs and a European tour supporting Orchestral Manoeuvres in the Dark, Cocteau Twins parted ways with bassist and founder member Will Heggie in mid-1983, leaving Robin Guthrie and Elizabeth Fraser unsure how they would continue. They returned to Scotland to write new songs as a duo and record a new album. Most of the album was written in the studio over a short period of time; Guthrie explained the process as "little of it was really planned, the songs just came together very naturally."

== Content ==
Robin Guthrie described the songs on the album as love songs, explaining: "Whereas Garlands contained a lot of 'religious' imagery (Liz's own impressions) the new LP is more concerned with love imagery." Writing for ZigZag, Jonh Wilde wrote that Head over Heels "finds the two remaining Twins willing to explore their sound with more adventure and faith in chance. Piano, sax, and various effects scatter themselves about (with purpose), adding new twists and turns to their enigma. The entrancing atmosphere that dominated their material up to now remains (indeed more potent now) but it is part of a more coherent overall song structure. 'Head over Heels' has a cutting edge, angular and intensely oblique."

Ned Raggett in The Guardian wrote that Fraser's singing was more direct in the mix than it had been on the band's first album, Garlands, and although her lyrics were still often understandable, she "began to shift away from conventional vocabulary towards enigmatic, emotional sound" on Head over Heels. Writing for The Quietus, journalist Julian Marszalek said that with this album, "Fraser's voice became just as much an instrument" as those played by the musicians, including Guthrie's "multi-layered and heavily reverberated guitars". He also remarked: "'In Our Angelhood' probably fits the bill best and it's a track that wouldn't have sounded out of place on Siouxsie and the Banshees' Kaleidoscope". "The Tinderbox (Of a Heart)" conveys a sense of menace and danger, while the closing track "Musette and Drums" features sweeping guitars and chimes. Cam Lindsay of Exclaim! wrote that "'Multifoiled' has a phlegmatic rockabilly lean to it, 'In Our Angelhood' is both post-punk and proto-shoegaze, and the dizzying 'Sugar Hiccup' could singlehandedly be the conception of dream pop."

== Release ==
Head over Heels was released on 24 October 1983 by 4AD. The original United Kingdom and Canadian cassette and CD of Head over Heels, and the Brazilian CD versions, also included the Sunburst and Snowblind EP. The 2003 CD, remastered by Guthrie, did not include the EP.

In March 2018, the album was repressed on 180g vinyl using new masters created from high definition files transferred from the original analogue tapes.

== Critical reception ==
Professional ratings
Review scores
Source	Rating
AllMusic	4.5/5 stars
Los Angeles Times	3.5/4 stars
Mojo	4/5 stars
Pitchfork	9.6/10
Record Collector	4/5 stars
Record Mirror	3/5 stars
The Rolling Stone Album Guide	3/5 stars
Smash Hits	8/10
Spin Alternative Record Guide	6/10
Uncut	9/10

The album was well-received by John Peel, who played the entire record on his radio show.

In the British music press the album received mixed reviews. It was given an 8 out of 10 rating in Smash Hits, while Record Mirror and NME were less favourable. NME reviewer Barney Hoskins praised Elizabeth Fraser's singing and the final track "Musette and Drums", but found most of the album "hollow and vaporous" and that Cocteau Twins overall appeared as a lesser version of Siouxsie and the Banshees.

Head over Heels was ranked at No. 7 in Sounds magazine's End of Year List for 1983.

In 2003, the album was named one of the most eccentric British albums of all time by Mojo magazine.

== In popular culture ==
The song "Sugar Hiccup" was played during the end titles of the fifth episode of series five titled "Doughnuts", of Scottish sitcom Two Doors Down in July 2022.

== Track listing ==
All tracks are written by Cocteau Twins (Elizabeth Fraser and Robin Guthrie).

Side A
No.	Title	Length
1.	"When Mama Was Moth"	3:06
2.	"Five Ten Fiftyfold"	4:59
3.	"Sugar Hiccup"	3:42
4.	"In Our Angelhood"	2:59
5.	"Glass Candle Grenades"	2:44

Side B
No.	Title	Length
1.	"In the Gold Dust Rush"	3:41
2.	"The Tinderbox (Of a Heart)"	4:57
3.	"Multifoiled"	2:36
4.	"My Love Paramour"	3:39
5.	"Musette and Drums"	4:39

== Personnel ==
Cocteau Twins

- Elizabeth Fraser – vocals
- Robin Guthrie – guitar, bass guitar, keyboards, drum machine

Additional personnel

- Jon Turner – engineering
- 23 Envelope – sleeve art design
- Ally Gibb – saxophone on "Five Ten Fiftyfold" (is thanked in credits as "Ally")

== Charts ==
Chart performance for Head over Heels
Chart (1983)	Peak position
UK Albums (Official Charts)	51
