= Carolyn's Fingers =

Promotional single by Cocteau Twins

from the album Blue Bell Knoll
- Released: 1988
- Recorded: 1987–1988
- Genre: Pop; shoegaze
- Length: 3:06
- Label: 4AD
- Songwriters: Elizabeth Fraser, Robin Guthrie, Simon Raymonde
- Producer: Cocteau Twins

"Carolyn's Fingers" is a song by Scottish alternative rock and dreampop band the Cocteau Twins, from their album Blue Bell Knoll. The credits include all three members of the group — Fraser, Guthrie and Raymonde as songwriters and well as producers.

The song became popular on US alternative radio stations and reached number two on Billboard Modern Rock Tracks. The band agreed to shoot a video for the song to promote the album.

== Background and writing ==
The song has since become one of the band's signature songs, receiving high praise from music critics and fans alike.

Speaking about the overall recording, writing and production of the album, bassist Simon Raymonde said "That whole period was incredibly fertile, even just before Blue Bell Knoll, with This Mortal Coil projects that I was deeply involved with, the Victorialand album [which Fraser and Guthrie recorded as a duo] and the Harold Budd collaboration, we were all super busy and – seemingly – fairly happy. Things seemed to be pretty good. We were at our most creative during that period, 1985 through 1990"

Speaking about the creative process of "Carolyn's Fingers", Raymonde stated that "the recording of Blue Bell Knoll was the first time we had a studio with our own key and a front door we could shut and just get on with it. And that made a massive difference as the three of us were getting on and understanding what we were trying to do; it all gelled pretty well in that period." It had been noted that during the songs production, Robin Guthrie did not utilise the rhythm section of the song to its full and higher potential. Although never confirmed by Guthrie or the band themselves, this may be largely due to Guthrie's intention and vision of placing Fraser's vocals and singing ability at the forefront of the song to make it standout more and give the band their unique sound.

Lead singer Fraser had a strong affection for both the track and the overall album, citing that "for the first time in years and I cried, I just thought it was so lovely. It was quite a difficult time, and I think we just decided to throw ourselves into the creativity."

== Reception ==
Writing in AllMusic Magazine, Ned Raggett claims that "Carolyn's Fingers" is the clear standout track from the album. He describes the song as being "perhaps the strongest individual Cocteau song since "Aikea-Guinea," with Fraser singing against herself over a rough, hip-hop-inspired rhythm while Guthrie peels off a fantastic main guitar melody and Raymonde contributes some supple bass work." Danny Riley, writing for The Quietus praises the way that the preceding songs on the album "appear to lead up nicely to Carolyn's Fingers', that beautifully concise, naïve rush of psychedelic dance-pop". Frazer's soprano vocals over an ecstatically lush production was highly praised by music critics.

The song was heavily played, on alternative radio stations in the US where it reached #2 on the Billboard Alternative Airplay chart. The song spent a total of 11 weeks on that Billboard Alternative Airplay chart.

== Music video ==
Fraser in the music video for "Carolyn's Fingers"

For the promotion of the album Blue Bell Knoll, a video was shot for one of its songs, "Carolyn's Fingers".

The video features a mix of split screen shots, depicting band members Elizabeth Fraser, Simon Raymonde and Robin Guthrie. Throughout the video, lead singer Fraser frequently appears in front of a blue backdrop resembling clouds in a blue sky whilst wearing a long white gown. A reel-to-reel tape recorder makes frequent appearances throughout the video.

As of July 2022, the music video for "Carolyn's Fingers" has close to 3 million views on the official 4AD music channel on YouTube.

== Legacy ==
Since its original release, "Carolyn's Fingers" has since been considered a fan favourite and one of the bands most popular and successful releases through their career. Fraser's vocal ability on the track has received praise for her "glossolalic vocals".

Frequently performed on live tours by the band since its release, it was also commonly performed by the band on television appearances, namely on Later... with Jools Holland in 1994.

== Track listing ==
The track listing for the US promo single released is as follows:

1. "Carolyn's Fingers" –3:06
2. "Ella Megalast Burls Forever" – 3:36

== Charts ==
Chart (1988)	Peak position
US Alternative Airplay (Billboard)	2

== See also ==
- Cocteau Twins discography
