= Sunburst and Snowblind =

EP by Cocteau Twins
- Released: 18 November 1983
- Recorded: 1983 at Palladium Studios, Edinburgh, Scotland
- Genre: Gothic rock; ethereal wave
- Length: 14:33
- Label: 4AD
- Producer: Cocteau Twins, John Fryer

Cocteau Twins chronology
Head over Heels (1983)	Sunburst and Snowblind (1983)	The Spangle Maker (1984)

Professional ratings
Review scores
Source	Rating
AllMusic	3/5 stars

Sunburst and Snowblind is an EP by Scottish alternative rock band Cocteau Twins. It was released on 18 November 1983 through the label 4AD. The EP features "Sugar Hiccup" from the album Head over Heels, as well as three other tracks. The title is taken from the first line in the opening track of Head Over Heels, "When Mama Was Moth".

"From the Flagstones" and "Hitherto" were later included on the 1986 compilation album The Pink Opaque, and the entire EP was included on in 1991's The Box Set. All songs except "Because of Whirl-Jack" have been performed live. Unlike many Cocteau Twins songs, "Sugar Hiccup" and "From the Flagstones" have discernible English lyrics.

The EP was later reissued as an appendage to the CD version of Head Over Heels in the United Kingdom, Brazil and Canada.

== Track listing ==
All tracks are written by Elizabeth Fraser and Robin Guthrie.

No.	Title	Length
1.	"Sugar Hiccup"	3:41
2.	"From the Flagstones"	3:39
3.	"Hitherto"	3:56
4.	"Because of Whirl-Jack"	3:29

== Personnel ==
- Elizabeth Fraser – vocals
- Robin Guthrie – instruments, production

Production

- John Fryer – production on tracks 2 and 4

== Charts ==
Chart performance for Sunburst and Snowblind
Chart (1983)	Peak position
UK Singles (OCC)	86
