= Milk & Kisses =

1996 studio album by Cocteau Twins

Studio album by Cocteau Twins
- Released: 15 April 1996
- Studios: Pors Poulhan, Brittany; September Sound, London
- Genre: Dream pop
- Length: 42:40
- Label: Fontana
- Producer: Cocteau Twins

Cocteau Twins chronology
Otherness (1995)	Milk & Kisses (1996)	BBC Sessions (1999)

Milk & Kisses is the eighth and final studio album by Scottish rock band Cocteau Twins, released on 15 April 1996 in the United Kingdom by Fontana Records and on 14 May 1996 in the United States by Capitol Records. It proved to be their last; a meeting two years later to record a new album ended with the breakup of the band.

== Background ==
Commenting on the inspiration for the title Milk & Kisses for the album, lead singer Elizabeth Fraser said "a friend was kind of comforting me on the phone and they were just being so sweet, really. They had empathy for what I was going through, and they said, 'I wish I could get the poison out of you. I wish I could just take it out of you and replace it with milk and kisses.' And I just thought that was really brilliant! It's beautiful, isn't it? I kept hearing it and feeling so good about it, it seemed right to use it". On the process of the recording of the album, Robin Guthrie claimed "making this record was a very joyous experience. It only took two months to record, which for us is amazing. Simon used to come into the studio in the daytime to do his thing, then I would come in at night to do mine, and then Liz would come in when neither one of us was around. We were never in the studio at the same time. This time, we really were together much of the time". Raymonde later recalled of Milk & Kisses "the brilliant thing about this album is that it all happened so fast. Robin and I would write a song and then not have to wait around forever the muse to visit Liz".

The song "Rilkean Heart" was an homage to Jeff Buckley, who was a lifelong lover of the work of poet Rainer Maria Rilke.

The Japanese edition of Milk & Kisses contains two bonus tracks—"Flock of Soul" and "Primitive Heart". The Hong Kong edition contains a duet version of "Serpentskirt" sung by Elizabeth Fraser with C-pop artist Faye Wong. Wong later recorded an acoustic version of "Rilkean Heart" for her 1997 album Faye Wong, on which Guthrie and Raymonde also wrote a new song, "Yu Le Chang" ("Amusement Park"), for her. In 2013, Sarah Brightman covered their song "Eperdu" on her album Dreamchaser.

== Recording ==
The band's previous album, Four-Calendar Café (1993), was recorded and released following the end of Fraser's and Guthrie's 13-year relationship. Fearing they would be unable to work together, each member had attempted to avoid the others, recording sessions in the studio independently. By 1995, the band seemed to be in a position where they were willing to work and spend time together again, and the recording process for Milk & Kisses was a lot smoother and more productive. "We worked quite closely together on this record, which we hadn't done so much on the previous one" stated Raymonde. "Robin and Liz had broken up and it was a complex time. But I actually think the band was in a really good place during Milk & Kisses. Some time had passed and they were both in relationships with different people. All of the rawness was gone from their relationship. Ironically, Liz left a year or so after we finished it."

An alternate Chinese version of the song "Serpentskirt" on the album was recorded by Faye Wong (Wangfei), and featuring lead singer of Cocteau Twins, Elizabeth Fraser, on backing vocals. Wong also recorded a version of "Rilkean Heart", also from Milk & Kisses.

== Release ==
The album was released by Fontana Records, their second release under the label following the release of their 1993 studio album Four Calendar Cafe. The album was released during a time of pressure and fragmented relations between the band and their label, with bassist Simon Raymonde claiming that the band should "never have signed the deal", claiming that the record label worked in a very different manner than that of the band, and that the Cocteau Twins were unable to replicate previous sales and success, which appeared to be a disappointment to the record label.

Speaking during the 25th anniversary of the album in 2021, when the album was re-released as a remaster, bassist Simon Raymonde stated "I don't think the recordings [on Milk and Kisses] are anywhere near the best we did by any stretch of the imagination. I think the songwriting was good, but I always felt the record sounded muffled. The remastering has actually helped that, which is something I almost never say. I do have a lot of great memories of it, because as you know it turned out to be our last record."

== Critical reception ==
Professional ratings
Review scores
Source	Rating
AllMusic	2.5/5 stars
Los Angeles Times	2.5/4 stars
Magic	4/6 stars
Martin C. Strong	7/10
Muzik	1.5/5 stars
Pitchfork	5.0/10 (1996); 7.4/10 (2018)

Upon release, journalist Mark Luffman of Melody Maker wasn't "impressed" in his review, saying "if they put their photos of themselves on the sleeves [...], Milk & Kisses would be an Enya album". Musically, he considered that "the formula is wearing thin now".

Retrospectively, AllMusic claimed in a review rated two and a half out of five stars that "Milk & Kisses found the band in a comfortable rut; they've created, and now perfected, a style of music so distinctive that there seems to be little recent creative growth. The result is a beautiful, lush, but somewhat dated and unengaging sounding album that tends to wash over the listener without making any real impact. It is, however, everything that a Cocteau Twins album promises; hypnotic, dreamy, awash in ethereal voices, and delicate, liquid guitars".

== Track listing ==
All songs written by Elizabeth Fraser, Robin Guthrie and Simon Raymonde.

1. "Violaine" – 3:45
2. "Serpentskirt" – 3:57
3. "Tishbite" – 3:50
4. "Half-Gifts" – 4:18
5. "Calfskin Smack" – 4:58
6. "Rilkean Heart" – 4:02
7. "Ups" – 3:34
8. "Eperdu" – 4:38
9. "Treasure Hiding" – 4:55
10. "Seekers Who Are Lovers" – 4:45

== Personnel ==
- Cocteau Twins – production, engineering
- Des Ward – engineering
- Lincoln Fong – engineering
- Mitsuo Tate – engineering
- Spiros Politis – photography

== Charts ==
1996 chart performance for Milk & Kisses
Chart (1996)	Peak position
Australian Albums (ARIA)	64
Belgian Albums (Ultratop Wallonia)	48
Canada Top Albums/CDs (RPM)	53
UK Albums (Official Charts)	17
US Billboard 200	99

2024 chart performance for Milk & Kisses
Chart (2024)	Peak position
Scottish Albums (Official Charts)	24
