= Tishbite (song) =

1996 single by the Cocteau Twins

Single by Cocteau Twins

from the album Milk & Kisses
- Released: March 1996
- Recorded: September Sound, London
- Genre: Dream pop
- Length: 3:13
- Label: Fontana
- Songwriter(s): Elizabeth Fraser; Robin Guthrie; Simon Raymonde
- Producer(s): Cocteau Twins

Cocteau Twins singles chronology
"Bluebeard" (1994)	"Tishbite" (1996)	"Violaine" (1996)

"Tishbite" is a single by Scottish band Cocteau Twins. It was released by Fontana Records in March 1996. It was the first single to be released from the UK top-20 album Milk & Kisses, the eighth and final long-play release from the band. The title of the song is an epithet of the prophet Elijah.

== Background and release ==
Five tracks were released across two CDs. It was the band's first multi-disc single and peaked at number 34 on the UK Singles Chart. In the bands native Scotland, it reached a peak of #29 on the Scottish Singles Chart, becoming their only appearance on the singles chart in Scotland.

Upon the release of the track, it received favourable radio airplay, particularly across Europe. In the United Kingdom, it was serviced to BBC Radio 1 where it was added to the stations C-list radio playlist. In other countries, including the Czech Republic, Denmark, Spain, Sweden and Poland, "Tishbite" made regular appearances on national radio broadcasting stations and enjoyed favourable airplay.

In Poland, the track was considered a "power play" track on the Polish radio broadcasting station Radio Manhattan.

== Recording and composition ==
"Tishbite" is described as a "hushed ballad that explores the often blurred lines between the real and imaginary dimensions of love". Recorded during the recording sessions of Milk and Kisses between 1995 and 1996, the song was written and recorded during a turbulent period for the band and in particular band members Elizabeth Fraser and Robin Guthrie who were both suffering a breakdown in their relationship.

== Track listing ==
All tracks are written by Cocteau Twins

=== CD: Fontana / CTCD5 (UK) ===
1. "Tishbite" – 3:13
2. "Primitive Heart" – 4:08
3. "Flock of Soul" – 3:37

=== CD: Fontana / CTDD5 (UK) ===
1. "Tishbite" – 3:13
2. "Round" – 3:34
3. "An Elan" – 4:37

== Performers ==
- Robin Guthrie
- Elizabeth Fraser
- Simon Raymonde

== Charts ==
Chart performance for "Tishbite"
Chart (1996)	Peak position
Australia (ARIA)	168
UK Singles (OCC)	34
Scotland (OCC)	29
