= Victorialand =

1986 album by the Cocteau Twins

Studio album by Cocteau Twins
- Released: 14 April 1986
- Recorded: 1985
- Genre: Ethereal wave; dream pop
- Length: 32:45
- Label: 4AD
- Producer: Cocteau Twins

Cocteau Twins chronology
The Pink Opaque (1986)	Victorialand (1986)	Love's Easy Tears (1986)

Professional ratings
Review scores
Source	Rating
AllMusic	4/5 stars
The Encyclopedia of Popular Music	3/5 stars
MusicHound Rock: The Essential Album Guide	3/5 stars
Martin C. Strong	8/10
Record-Journal	B−
The Rolling Stone Album Guide	4/5 stars
Spin Alternative Record Guide	8/10
Uncut	2/5 stars

Victorialand is the fourth studio album by Scottish rock band Cocteau Twins, released by 4AD in 1986. Working without bassist Simon Raymonde, vocalist Elizabeth Fraser and guitarist/producer Robin Guthrie opted for a subtler sound on the album.

== Background ==
Victorialand was recorded without bassist Simon Raymonde, who had been enlisted to collaborate on the second This Mortal Coil album Filigree & Shadow (1986). The duo of Guthrie and Fraser opted for a subtler sound which dispensed with most percussion and bass, instead consisting primarily of Guthrie's "delicate guitar filigrees and lush, produced textures." As is often the case with Fraser's vocals, the lyrics are indecipherable. For example, Fraser took a passage from a non-English language book to write the lyrics for "Whales Tails", not knowing what the words meant.

The album title refers to the part of Antarctica known as Victoria Land, after Queen Victoria (and forming the British claim to the continent, currently dormant under international treaty). Some of the track titles were borrowed from passages on the Arctic and Antarctic in David Attenborough's The Living Planet: A Portrait of the Earth, the accompanying book to his 1984 BBC nature documentary series The Living Planet; an example is "Throughout the dark months of April and May, the birds display to one another and finally mate" on page 54.

== Release ==
On its initial release in the UK, the vinyl edition was a 12" disc which played at 45 rpm, which would be normal for an EP rather than a full album, which would normally play at 33⅓ rpm. This was due to difficulties in the mastering process in reproducing the minimal soundscapes. Some test pressings at 33⅓ rpm are known to exist.

An uncredited instrumental version of "Oomingmak" was used as a backing track for the credits at the end of the 4AD compilation video for Lonely Is an Eyesore. This instrumental version was later made available on the band's 1991 4AD singles box set.

== Reception ==
One critic described the album as ethereal and resembling "early Gong space-rock with much of the stuffing left out". The Spin Alternative Record Guide called the album the Twins' "simplest" and "most beautiful".

== Track listing ==
All songs written by Elizabeth Fraser and Robin Guthrie.

1. "Lazy Calm" – 6:36
2. "Fluffy Tufts" – 3:07
3. "Throughout the Dark Months of April and May" – 3:05
4. "Whales Tails" – 3:18
5. "Oomingmak" – 2:43
6. "Little Spacey" – 3:28
7. "Feet-Like Fins" – 3:27
8. "How to Bring a Blush to the Snow" – 3:52
9. "The Thinner the Air" – 3:16

== Personnel ==
- Elizabeth Fraser – vocals
- Robin Guthrie – guitar, bass, drum machine, keyboards

Additional personnel

- Richard Thomas of Dif Juz – saxophone and tablas

== Charts ==
Chart performance for Victorialand
Chart (1986)	Peak position
UK Albums (OCC)	10
