= Blue Bell Knoll =

1988 studio album by Cocteau Twins

Studio album by Cocteau Twins
- Released: 19 September 1988
- Genre: Dream pop; ethereal wave
- Length: 35:17
- Label: 4AD
- Producer: Cocteau Twins

Cocteau Twins chronology
| The Moon and the Melodies (1986) | Blue Bell Knoll (1988) | Heaven or Las Vegas (1990) |

Original CD release

Blue Bell Knoll is the fifth studio album by Scottish dream pop band Cocteau Twins, released on 19 September 1988 by 4AD. This was the band's first album to receive major-label distribution in the United States, as it was originally licensed by Capitol Records from 4AD for North American release. After a period of being out of print while 4AD reclaimed the American distribution rights for their back catalogue, the album (along with much of the band's 4AD material) was remastered by guitarist Robin Guthrie and reissued in 2003. Vocalist Elizabeth Fraser named the album after a peak in southern Utah called Bluebell Knoll.

== Background ==
Upon the release of the album, Ivo Watts-Russell, co–founder of the band's record label 4AD, commented on lead singer Elizabeth Fraser's vocals on Blue Bell Knoll saying "It's got her best singing since she discovered her higher range. 'Carolyn's Fingers' is absolutely beautiful, and still gives me the shivers". Fraser would later comment on the album, saying "Blue Bell Knoll was the easiest I've ever done to make a record. The records are a representation of our coping skills, and I think I was very much in denial, and I think that you can hear that on Blue Bell Knoll. Not one word can you grasp. Giving anything away it just wasn't allowed". Raymonde claimed there was a greater sense of freedom around the recording of the album, saying "it really felt like a period of creativity and freedom, we were all getting on great musically and socially, Liz and Robin were about to have a baby, I was about to get married, there was lots of joy around. Very productive! It was a really fun record to make".

The lyrics of the songs are entirely in Elizabeth Fraser's self-constructed language: "I gained so much from [inventing language]", Fraser said in a 2017 interview, "Writing Blue Bell Knoll I had a wonderful freedom to put lyrics aside and not to worry [about people's opinions]." Fraser also revealed some of the ideas of the song titles: "Athol-Brose" was named after the Scottish drink Atholl brose, "A Kissed Out Red Floatboat" is "a romantic image of being open and having your heart open" and that "Ella Megalast Burls Forever" is a tribute to Robin Guthrie's mother.

== Release and performance ==
Blue Bell Knoll was released in September 1988 by 4AD and Capitol Records (in the United States), where it marked the first major record label release for the band in the United States market. The album peaked at number fifteen on the UK Albums Chart, and number one hundred and nine in the United States on the Billboard 200 albums chart. "Carolyn's Fingers" from the album reached number two on the US Alternative Airplay chart. In Japan, the song "Athol-Brose" was released as a single in 1990, accompanied with "Carolyn's Fingers" and "Iceblink Luck", following a feature in a Japanese television commercial.

The release of the album marked the first time a 4AD release was released commercially in DAT format, with a limited-edition gatefold sleeve being made available for the vinyl release of the album. To further promote the release of the album, two promotional music videos were created to accompany the release of "Carolyn's Fingers" and "Cico Buff". In the US, promotional-copies on 7-inch and 12-inch of "Carolyn's Fingers", featuring "Ella Megalast Burls Forever" and "A Kissed Out Red Floatboat" as B-sides were pressed for airplay. Upon the album's release, it was voted album of the week by Dutch radio broadcaster Omroepvereniging VARA.

In 2014, the album was repressed on 180g vinyl using new high-definition masters. Blue Bell Knoll was ranked as the 89th best album of the 1980s in Pitchfork magazines "200 Best Albums of the 1980s" list.

== Critical reception ==
Professional ratings
Review scores
| Source | Rating |
|---|---|
| AllMusic | 3/5 stars |
| Drowned in Sound | 10/10 |
| NME | 9/10 |
| Pitchfork | 8.3/10 |
| Q | 4/5 stars |
| Record Mirror | 4/5 |
| The Rolling Stone Album Guide | 3.5/5 stars |
| Sounds | 3.5/5 stars |
| Spin Alternative Record Guide | 6/10 |
| The Village Voice | C+ |

In a contemporary review of Blue Bell Knoll, Victoria Thieberger of The Age appraised it as "everything that atmospheric music should be and usually isn't". NME also reacted positively, ranking Blue Bell Knoll at number 33 on its list of 1988's best albums. A less favourable response came from The Village Voice's Robert Christgau, who wrote that "these faeries are in the aura business" and asked "what are they doing on the alternative rock charts? Ever hear the one about being so open-minded that when you lay down to sleep your brains fall out?"

AllMusic critic Ned Raggett retrospectively wrote that "Blue Bell Knoll has some striking moments that are pure Cocteaus at their best", citing the opening track "Blue Bell Knoll", "For Phoebe Still a Baby" and "Carolyn's Fingers" as highlights, before suggesting that "things slowly but surely slide back a bit" afterwards. Gen Williams of Drowned in Sound disagreed, saying in her 2002 review that "from start to finish, it's a record that gleams with grace and emotion; chiming, mournful guitars and layered tapestry of sounds evoke a vast array of imagery". Consequence's Len Comaratta wrote that the album, "with its rich and ambitious expressiveness, returns the band to its dream pop roots in the ether." Pitchfork listed Blue Bell Knoll as the 81st best album of the 1980s, with reviewer Stuart Berman calling it "a record that courts the pop mainstream through its crisp, radiant production and also boldly rejects it through vocally smeared songs that are nigh impossible to sing along to."

== Track listing ==
All tracks are written by Elizabeth Fraser, Robin Guthrie, and Simon Raymonde.

| No. | Title | Length |
|---|---|---|
| 1. | "Blue Bell Knoll" | 3:24 |
| 2. | "Athol-Brose" | 2:59 |
| 3. | "Carolyn's Fingers" | 3:08 |
| 4. | "For Phoebe Still a Baby" | 3:16 |
| 5. | "The Itchy Glowbo Blow" | 3:21 |
| 6. | "Cico Buff" | 3:49 |
| 7. | "Suckling the Mender" | 3:35 |
| 8. | "Spooning Good Singing Gum" | 3:52 |
| 9. | "A Kissed Out Red Floatboat" | 4:10 |
| 10. | "Ella Megalast Burls Forever" | 3:39 |
| Total length: | | 35:17 |

== Personnel ==
- Elizabeth Fraser – vocals
- Robin Guthrie – guitar, keyboards, synth & drum machine programming, production
- Simon Raymonde – bass guitar, keyboards

== Charts ==
Chart performance for Blue Bell Knoll
| Chart (1988–1989) | Peak position |
|---|---|
| Australian Albums (ARIA) | 119 |
| UK Albums (OCC) | 15 |
| US Billboard 200 | 109 |
