= Violaine =

Single by Cocteau Twins

from the album Milk & Kisses
- Released: 8 July 1996
- Studio: September Sound, London
- Genre: Dream pop, ethereal wave
- Length: 3:13
- Label: Fontana
- Songwriter(s): Elizabeth Fraser; Robin Guthrie; Simon Raymonde
- Producer(s): Cocteau Twins

Cocteau Twins singles chronology
"Tishbite" (1996)	"Violaine" (1996)

"Violaine" is a single by Cocteau Twins. It was released by Fontana Records in July 1996. It was the second single to be released from the Milk & Kisses album, and their last single to be released from a non-compilation album. It reached No. 56 on the UK Singles Chart.

== Background and release ==
"Violaine" was the second single to be released from the 1996 album Milk and Kisses, and includes five tracks released across two CDs, making it the band's second multi-disc single. It was the last single to be released by the band prior to their disbandment in 1997 following a series of unsuccessful attempts by the band to record new material for their ninth studio album. The song "Touch Upon Touch", which was released in 1996 on the compilation Volume 17 and in 1997 on the compilation Splashed with Many a Speck, was the last song recorded by the band prior to their breakup in 1997.

Like their previous single, "Violaine" enjoyed considerable success on European radio, including in Poland where it was considered a "power play" track on various radio stations in the country.

The lyrics of "Violaine" are words in English sung backwards.

== Critical reception ==
Justin Chadwick of Albumism felt that the song "ranks among the band's finest arrangements ever". In a review for Milk & Kisses on Sputnikmusic, Robert Garland wrote that "Violaine has an impact as far as dream pop goes, but the album's larger mainstays are found in its belly."

== Live performances ==
The track has been performed several times by the band, mostly during their 1996 tour for Milk and Kisses prior to the disbandment of the group.

== Track listing ==
All tracks are written by Cocteau Twins

=== CD: Fontana / CTDC6 (UK) ===
1. "Violaine" – 3:46
2. "Smile" – 3:52
3. "Tranquil Eye" – 4:25

=== CD: Fontana / CTDD6 (UK) ===
1. "Violaine" – 3:46
2. "Circling Girl" – 3:32
3. "Alice" – 4:26

== Personnel ==
- Robin Guthrie
- Elizabeth Fraser
- Simon Raymonde

== Charts ==
Chart performance for "Violaine"
Chart (1996)	Peak position
UK Singles (OCC)	56
Scotland (OCC)	66
