= Heaven or Las Vegas (song) =

1990 single by the Cocteau Twins

Promotional single by Cocteau Twins

from the album Heaven or Las Vegas
- Released: October 1990
- Studio: September Sound, London, England
- Genre: Dream pop
- Length: 4:59
- Label: 4AD; Capitol
- Songwriter: Cocteau Twins
- Producer: Cocteau Twins

"Heaven or Las Vegas" is a song by Scottish band Cocteau Twins from the album of the same name. Described as dream pop, the song became popular on alternative rock radio stations in the US and reached No. 9 on Billboard's Modern Rock Tracks chart in 1991. The track has been recognized as one of the greatest accomplishments in the genre of dream pop as well as one of the Cocteau Twins' signature songs. A music video for the song was released for media to promote the album.

== Background ==
Cocteau Twins guitarist Robin Guthrie used four electric guitars during the recording of "Heaven or Las Vegas", including a 1959 Jazzmaster, a 1959 Stratocaster, a PRS guitar and a modified Levinson Blade JM during the track's slide guitar solo, which has been said to have "encapsulated the band’s staggering confidence in arrangements and execution." Bassist Simon Raymonde referred to Guthrie as a "mix king" and a "sonic master" for his work on the track.

"The drum machine programming is all down to Mr. Guthrie. He has always been a frustrated drummer. And ever since we started recording together, from the very first drum machines you could programme, that was always his big obsession, that would be the first thing he would start off with. But to run you through the Cocteau Twins' recording process, we would get in the studio, have a chat about what sort of song we wanted to do: fast, slow, medium, whatever. Robin would sit at the drum machine for two minutes, put together some kind of pattern, we’d record it in a loop and then just plug guitars in – or sit at the piano – and jam. And then we would record it and that would be the song."

— Simon Raymonde

The song is built off a "simplistic" D-G-Cadd9 chord progression, which is ventured from during Guthrie's "soaring overdriven slide part." It contains "sparkling arpeggios" that emanate a "heavenly" aura, as its title would suggest. Popdust noted how the title juxtaposes "two places that really couldn't be any more different from each other." The track was popular on US alternative radio stations and entered the US Billboard Alternative Songs chart in late November 1990, reaching a peak of No. 9 on the chart dated for the week of January 12, 1991. It was the third of three consecutive top ten hits on the Modern rock tracks for the band, and it would be their last song to earn a placement on the chart.

== Legacy ==
Paste declared "Heaven or Las Vegas" as "the album’s literal and figurative centerpiece (and perhaps dream pop’s all-time pinnacle)", praising Fraser's vocal performance "atop guitars that gleam like diamonds, pianos that drip like water and a hefty whisper of a drum shuffle." Vice's James Greig described the song as "extremely accessible and probably the best place to start if you’re a complete novice to the band." The Guardian listed the song as one of the band's ten best, calling it "a lovely distillation of the Cocteaus’ knack for a slower but soaring singalong in the newer style, especially on the choruses and the conclusion."

Canadian R&B singer The Weeknd named a song "Heaven or Las Vegas" on his Thursday mixtape, after previously sampling Cocteau Twins' "Cherry-Coloured Funk" on his song "The Knowing" from the House of Balloons mixtape. The Weeknd has said that "Cocteau Twins play such a huge role in my sound." In 2020, the song gained a resurgence in popularity thanks to the social media platform TikTok, as users use the song to soundtrack beauty tutorials or attempts to decipher Fraser's lyrics.

== Track listing ==
All tracks written by Cocteau Twins.

1. "Heaven or Las Vegas" (Edit) – 3:59
2. "Dials" – 2:41
3. "Heaven or Las Vegas" (Album Version) – 4:54

== Charts ==
Chart (1990–91)	Peak position
US Alternative Airplay (Billboard)	9
