= Love's Easy Tears =

EP by Cocteau Twins
- Released: 1 September 1986
- Studios: Good Earth Studios, London
- Genres: Ethereal wave; dream pop
- Length: 13:32
- Label: 4AD
- Producer: Cocteau Twins

Cocteau Twins chronology
Victorialand (1986)	Love's Easy Tears (1986)	The Moon and the Melodies (1986)

Professional ratings
Review scores
Source	Rating
AllMusic	3/5 stars
Spin Alternative Record Guide	4/10

Love's Easy Tears is an EP by Scottish dream pop band Cocteau Twins. It was released by 4AD in September 1986 as a 12" single, and was later re-released in 1991 as a CD single in the U.K. with a fourth track, Orange Appled, included. The original U.S. 12" vinyl, released in 1986 by Relativity, also had four tracks but they appeared on the album out of order as compared to the original United Kingdom release. Love's Easy Tears was the eighth EP released by Cocteau Twins, and their last EP for 4AD. They would not release another EP until 1993's Snow.

== Reception ==
Michael Fischer of The Michigan Daily described Love's Easy Tears as "ethereal romanticism" that made "for the closest thing in pop to a music for Gothic cathedrals".

== Track listing ==
All songs written and produced by Cocteau Twins

=== 7": 4AD / AD 610 (UK) ===
1. "Love's Easy Tears" – 3:36
2. "Those Eyes, That Mouth" – 3:37

=== 12": 4AD / BAD 610 (UK) ===
1. "Love's Easy Tears" – 3:36
2. "Those Eyes, That Mouth" – 3:37
3. "Sigh's Smell of Farewell" – 3:33

=== 12”: Relativity 88561-8141-1 (US) ===
1. "Love's Easy Tears" – 3:36
2. "Orange Appled" – 2:50
3. "Sigh's Smell of Farewell" – 3:33
4. "Those Eyes, That Mouth" – 3:37

=== CD: 4AD / BAD 610 CD (UK) ===
1. "Love's Easy Tears" – 3:36
2. "Those Eyes, That Mouth" – 3:37
3. "Sigh's Smell of Farewell" – 3:33
4. "Orange Appled" – 2:46
- CD released in 1991

== Charts ==
Chart performance for Love's Easy Tears
Chart (1986)	Peak position
UK Singles (Official Charts)	53
