= BBC Sessions (Cocteau Twins album) =

1999 compilation album by the Cocteau Twins

Compilation album by Cocteau Twins
- Released: 12 October 1999
- Recorded: 15 July 1982 – 10 April 1996
- Genre: Gothic rock; ethereal wave; dream pop
- Length: 103:01
- Label: Bella Union; Rykodisc

Cocteau Twins chronology
Milk & Kisses (1996)	BBC Sessions (1999)	Stars and Topsoil (2000)

BBC Sessions is an album of BBC studio recordings by the band Cocteau Twins released in 1999 by Bella Union in the UK and Rykodisc in the US. The album spanned the band's career from the early 1980s through the 1990s. Much of the first disc was taken from a series of early 1980s Peel sessions. The second disc contained several tracks recorded during the group's performance on the 1980s Radio 1 series Saturday Live. The compilation peaked at No. 87 on the UK Albums Chart.

Professional ratings
Review scores
Source	Rating
AllMusic	4.5/5 stars
The Austin Chronicle	3/5 stars
The A.V. Club	mixed
Pitchfork	5.3/10
PopMatters	8/10

== Track listing ==
=== Disc one ===
John Peel Session, 15 July 1982

1. "Wax and Wane" – 3:50
2. "Garlands" – 4:19
3. "Alas Dies Laughing" – 3:29
4. "Feathers-Oar-Blades" – 2:19

John Peel Session, 31 January 1983

5. "Hearsay Please" – 4:23
6. "Dear Heart" – 3:37
7. "Blind Dumb Deaf" – 3:41
8. "Hazel" – 3:22

John Peel Session, 4 October 1983

9. "The Tinderbox (Of a Heart)" – 4:46
10. "Strange Fruit" (Billie Holiday cover written by Abel Meeropol) – 1:52
11. "Hitherto" – 3:57
12. "From the Flagstones" – 3:32

Kid Jensen Session, 10 October 1983

13. "Sugar Hiccup" – 3:41
14. "In Our Angelhood" – 3:56
15. "My Hue and Cry" – 3:02 (Previously unreleased)
16. "Musette and Drums" – 4:11

=== Disc two ===
Saturday Live, 3 December 1983

1. "Hitherto" – 3:56
2. "From the Flagstones" – 3:55
3. "Musette and Drums" – 3:33

John Peel Session, 5 September 1984

4. "Pepper-Tree" – 4:12
5. "Beatrix" – 4:06
6. "Ivo" – 3:03
7. "Otterley" – 3:34

Mark Radcliffe Session, 12 March 1996

8. "Serpentskirt" – 4:29
9. "Golden-Vein" – 3:46
10. "Half-Gifts" – 2:44
11. "Seekers Who Are Lovers" – 3:50

Robert Elms Session, 10 April 1996

12. "Calfskin Smack" – 4:23
13. "Fifty-Fifty Clown" – 4:27
14. "Violaine" – 3:47

== Personnel ==
- Producer – Barry Anthony Andrews (tracks: 2-4 to 2-7), Dale Griffin (tracks: 1-5 to 1-8, 1-13 to 1-16), Jim Lahat (tracks: 2-12 to 2-14), John Owen Williams (tracks: 1-1 to 1-4), John Walters (tracks: 1-9 to 1-12), Lis Roberts (tracks: 2-8 to 2-11), Mark Radcliffe (tracks: 2-1 to 2-3), Suzanne Gilfilian (tracks: 2-12 to 2-14)
- Engineer – Dave Dade (tracks: 1-1 to 1-4), Harry Parker (tracks: 1-5 to 1-8), Lincoln Fong (tracks: 2-8 to 2-11), Mike Engles (tracks: 1-1 to 1-4, 1-13 to 1-16), Nick Gomm (tracks: 2-4 to 2-7), Paul Strudwick (tracks: 2-12 to 2-14)
