= Cocteau Twins =

Scottish rock band (1979–1997)

- Cocteau Twins in 1986, from left to right: Simon Raymonde, Robin Guthrie and Elizabeth Fraser

Background information
- Origin: Grangemouth, Stirlingshire, Scotland
- Genres: Dream pop; ethereal wave; gothic rock; post-punk
- Years active: 1979–1997
- Labels: 4AD; Relativity; Capitol; Fontana; Bella Union
- Past members: Elizabeth Fraser; Robin Guthrie; Simon Raymonde; Will Heggie
- Website: cocteautwins.com

Cocteau Twins were a Scottish rock band active from 1979 to 1997. They were formed in Grangemouth on the Firth of Forth by Robin Guthrie (guitars, drum machine) and Will Heggie (bass), adding Elizabeth Fraser (vocals) in 1981. In 1983, Heggie was replaced by multi-instrumentalist Simon Raymonde. The group earned critical praise for their ethereal, effects-laden sound and the soprano vocals of Fraser, whose lyrics often eschew any recognisable language. They pioneered the 1980s alternative subgenre of dream pop and helped define what would become shoegaze.

In 1982, the band signed with the record label 4AD and released their debut album, Garlands. The addition of Raymonde in 1983 solidified their best-known lineup, which soon produced the No. 29 UK single "Pearly-Dewdrops' Drops", their highest-charting UK single. The trio crystallised their "swelling, euphoric" dream pop style on the 1984 album Treasure, which became the band's first UK Top 40 album. In April 1986, they released their fourth album, Victorialand, becoming their first top ten album in the UK.

The group's fifth album Blue Bell Knoll (1988) peaked at number 15 in the UK and at 109 on the Billboard 200 in the US: "Carolyn's Fingers" was popular on US alternative radio stations and reached number 2 on the Billboard Modern Rock Tracks. Their sixth album, Heaven or Las Vegas (1990) became their most commercially successful album in the UK, reaching number 7 on the albums chart.

By 1993, the band had left 4AD for Fontana Records, and released their seventh album Four-Calendar Café (1993). Following its release they made their debut American television appearance on The Tonight Show with Jay Leno performing the single "Bluebeard". Four-Calendar Café became their highest-charting album on the Billboard 200 in the United States, reaching number 78. They released their eighth and final album Milk & Kisses in April 1996, supported by two singles – "Tishbite" and "Violaine". After nearly 20 years together, the group disbanded in 1997 in part due to issues stemming from the disintegration of Fraser's and Guthrie's romantic relationship.

== History ==
=== 1979–1983: Early years ===
Guthrie and Heggie, both from Grangemouth, Scotland, formed the band in 1979. They met Fraser in 1981 at a local disco, The Hotel International, where Guthrie was DJing, and she became the group's vocalist.

Prior to releasing their debut album, the band recorded a four track session for John Peel in June 1982, including "Wax and Wane" and "Garlands". Their debut LP Garlands, released through 4AD in July 1982, was a sales success, peaking at number 14 in the indie albums chart in the UK. Sounds wrote that the style of the band was "mixing strong Siouxsie and the Banshees and Joy Division influences". NME established the same comparisons, likening it to "Banshee John McKay's guitar", while Spin compared it in 1986 to Bauhaus. The album was followed by the EP Lullabies in October. In April 1983, the band released a second EP, Peppermint Pig.

A European tour supporting Orchestral Manoeuvres in the Dark followed, but after a gig in Hamburg the band left the tour and parted ways with bassist Will Heggie, leaving Guthrie and Fraser unsure how they would continue. The pair returned to Scotland, settling to re-think their whole approach and write new songs for an album.

Cocteau Twins' sound on their first three recordings relied on the combination of Heggie's rhythmic basslines, Guthrie's minimalist guitar melodies, and Fraser's voice. The band's next full-length LP record, Head over Heels, relied solely on the latter two, following Heggie's departure (he would later join Lowlife). This led to the characteristic Cocteau Twins sound: Fraser's voice, by turns ethereal and operatic, combined with increasingly effects-heavy guitar playing by Guthrie (who has often said that he is far more interested in the way the guitar is recorded than in the actual notes being played; he later said that his reliance on effects and layering was initially due to his own technical limitations). Guthrie has cited Phil Spector's wall of sound as "an obvious influence" on his sound.

In 1983, the band participated in 4AD's This Mortal Coil project, which spawned a cover version of Tim Buckley's "Song to the Siren" (performed by Guthrie and Fraser). Despite appearing under the This Mortal Coil name, the cover has subsequently become one of the best-known Cocteau Twins tracks. While working on This Mortal Coil, Guthrie and Fraser became acquainted with another project contributor, multi-instrumentalist Simon Raymonde (formerly a member of Drowning Craze), who joined Cocteau Twins later that year.

=== 1984–1989: Rise to fame ===
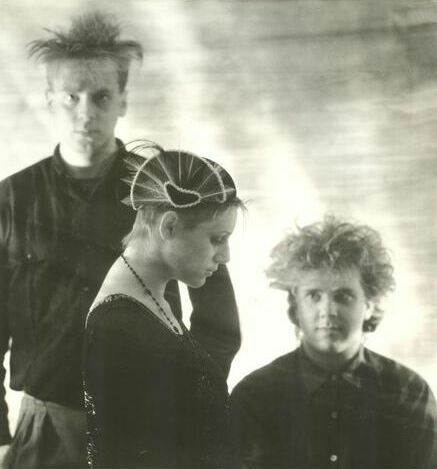
Cocteau Twins promotional shoot to promote the release of The Pink Opaque (1986)

With Raymonde, the band released a series of albums and EPs that explored their new style. These included The Spangle Maker (1984), Treasure (1984), Aikea-Guinea (1985), Tiny Dynamine (1985), Echoes in a Shallow Bay (1985), and Love's Easy Tears (1986). From The Spangle Maker, "Pearly Dewdrops Drops" was a hit single, reaching no. 29 on the UK Singles Chart in April 1984 and No. 1 on the UK Indie Chart. Raymonde, who was called in to work on the second album by This Mortal Coil, did not participate in the recording of the fourth Cocteau Twins LP, Victorialand (1986), a predominantly acoustic record which featured only Guthrie and Fraser. Raymonde returned to the group for The Moon and the Melodies (1986), a collaboration with ambient composer Harold Budd, which was not released under the Cocteau Twins name, instead being credited to all four participating musicians alphabetically.

In 1985, 4AD signed an agreement with Relativity Records for distribution of Cocteau Twins releases in the US and other territories. To commemorate the event, the compilation The Pink Opaque (1986) was released as a way of introducing the new, broader audience to the band's back catalogue.

While remaining a 4AD band, Cocteau Twins signed a major-label contract with Capitol Records in 1988 for distribution in the U.S., and released their fifth album, Blue Bell Knoll, that September. "Carolyn's Fingers" was popular on alternative radio, reaching number two on the Billboard Modern Rock Tracks chart.

=== 1990–1994: Mainstream success ===
The group released Heaven or Las Vegas in early 1990. The most commercially successful of their many recordings, the album reached number seven in the UK Albums Chart immediately after its release. Despite the success of the record and the subsequent concert tours, not everything was well with the band. They parted ways with 4AD following Heaven or Las Vegas partly because of conflicts with the label's founder Ivo Watts-Russell, and were close to breaking up over internal problems due in large part to Guthrie's substance abuse.

While on their international tour supporting Heaven or Las Vegas, the group signed a new recording contract with Mercury Records subsidiary Fontana for the UK and elsewhere, while retaining their US relationship with Capitol. They added several live musicians to their touring band during this era, to better replicate the layered sound of their studio albums. In 1991, 4AD and Capitol released a box set that compiled the band's EPs from 1982 to 1990, and also included a bonus disc of rare and previously unreleased material.

Fraser and Guthrie had a daughter, Lucy Belle, born in 1989. The couple ended their 13-year relationship in 1993. The band's seventh LP, Four-Calendar Café, their first since Fraser and Guthrie's separation, was released in late 1993. The band explained that Four-Calendar Café was a response to the turmoil that had engulfed them in the intervening years, with Guthrie entering rehab and quitting alcohol and drugs, and Fraser undergoing psychotherapy. The band made their debut appearance on television in the U.S. for a performance of "Bluebeard" on the Tonight Show with Jay Leno in 1993. Four-Calendar Café was the band's highest position on the Billboard 200, peaking at number 78, and stayed three weeks in that chart. Fraser provided guest vocals on the Future Sound of London's single "Lifeforms" in 1993.

=== 1995–1997: Milk & Kisses and break-up ===
In 1995, the band released two new extended plays (EP) – Twinlights and Otherness. NME dubbed the latter as "Cocteau Twins and ambient" and added, "it never finds a point". Some of the tracks on Twinlights and Otherness were versions of songs from the band's eighth album, Milk & Kisses (1996). The record saw the return of more heavily layered guitars, and Fraser began once again to obscure her lyrics, though not entirely. Two singles were taken from the album: "Tishbite" and "Violaine"; both exist in two CD versions, with different B-sides included on each. Raymonde said on the recording of the album that it "all happened so fast", further claiming that "Robin and I would write a song and then not have to wait around forever the muse to visit Liz". Guthrie described making the album as "a very joyous experience", stating that "Simon [Raymonde] used to come into the studio in the daytime to do his thing, then I would come in at night to do mine, and then Liz would come in when neither one of us was around".

The band, augmented by an extra guitarist and a drummer, toured extensively to support the album, their last for Mercury/Fontana. A new song, "Touch Upon Touch", which debuted during the live shows and was recorded later in 1996 was also one of the two songs written and arranged by Fraser, Guthrie and Raymonde for Chinese pop singer Faye Wong for her Mandarin album Fuzao released in June 1996, the other being "Tranquil Eye" from Violaine released in October 1996.

In 1997, while recording what was to have been their ninth LP, the trio disbanded over irreconcilable differences in part related to the breakup of Guthrie and Fraser. Some songs were partially recorded and possibly completed, but the band has stated that they will likely never be finished or released in any form.

== Post-breakup ==
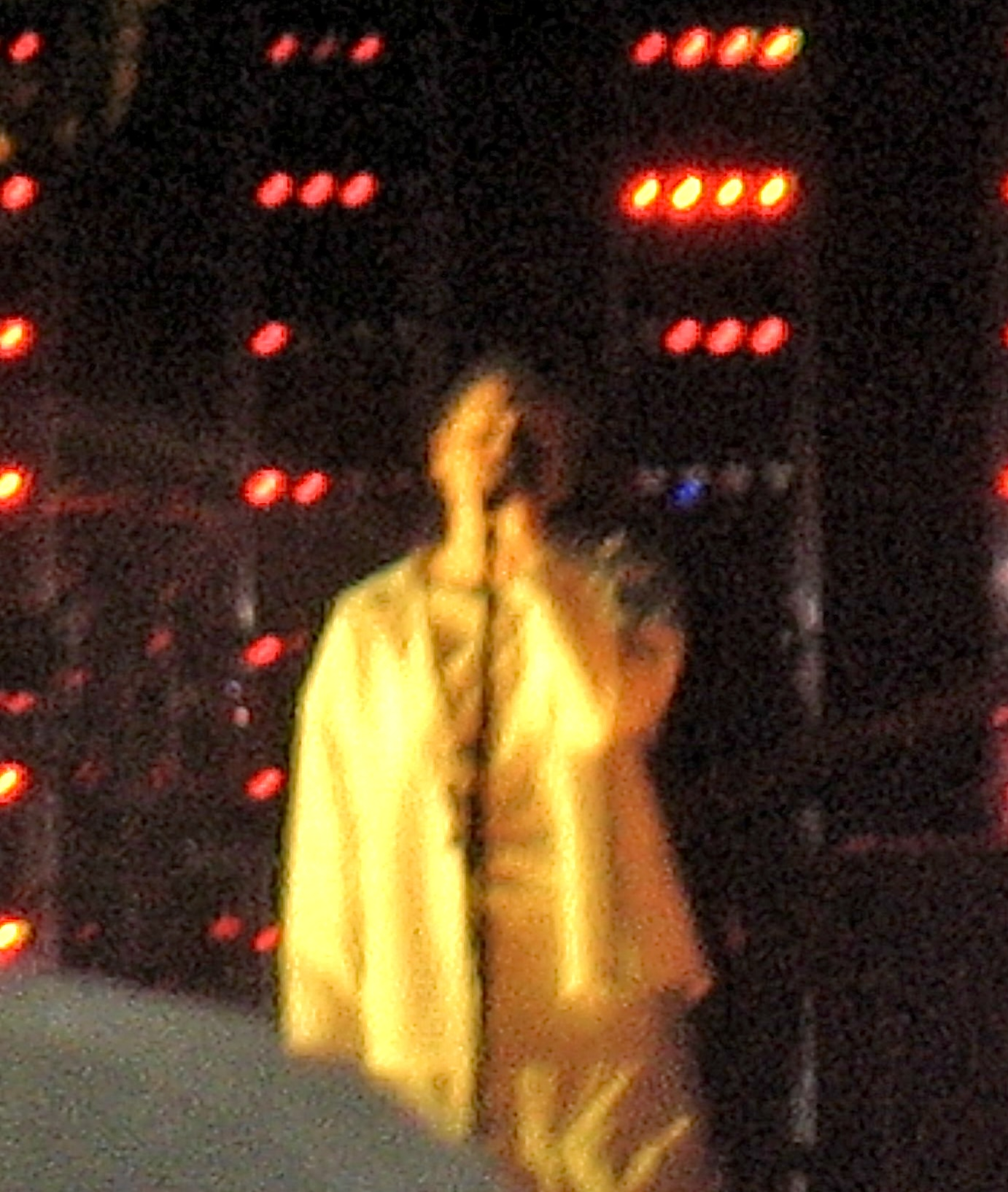
Lead singer Elizabeth Fraser performing live in 2006

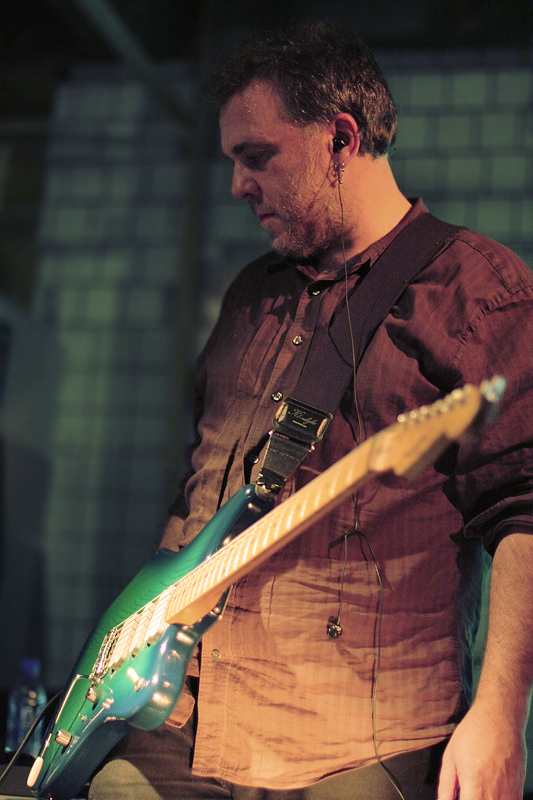
Guitarist Robin Guthrie performing in 2008

Fraser provided guest vocals for three songs on Massive Attack's Mezzanine in 1998 (as well as touring with them several times), and for other musical projects and groups. She wrote the lyrics and sang the vocals for "Teardrop" by Massive Attack which was released as a single in 1998 and reached number 10 in the UK singles chart. In 1999, Bella Union, the record label founded by Guthrie and Raymonde, released a double-CD Cocteau Twins compilation entitled BBC Sessions. The collection is a complete record of the band's appearances on UK radio programmes from 1982 to 1996, with rare and unreleased material included. In 2000, 4AD released Stars and Topsoil, a compilation chosen by the band members that had been released during their years with 4AD; all recordings had been digitally remastered by Guthrie. Fraser provided the vocals for "Lament for Gandalf" on The Lord of the Rings: The Fellowship of the Ring soundtrack, and in 2000, she sang with Peter Gabriel on Ovo (The Millennium Show). In 2003, 4AD released digitally remastered versions of the first six Cocteau Twins LPs.

Raymonde released the solo album Blame Someone Else as the first release on Bella Union in 1997. He also co-produced the posthumous album by Billy Mackenzie from the Associates, then went on to produce several Domino Records artists like James Yorkston, Archie Bronson Outfit (whom he later managed) and Clearlake. Additionally, he has produced the UK band the Duke Spirit, London-based duo Helene, former Golden Virgins frontman Lucas Renney and has mixed the Mercury Prize nominated album The End of History by Fionn Regan. In his role running Bella Union, he has discovered such artists as Laura Veirs, Fleet Foxes, Midlake, Lift to Experience, the Low Anthem, I Break Horses, the Czars and John Grant. In January 2005, Cocteau Twins announced that they would be reforming to perform at the Coachella Valley Music and Arts Festival on 30 April, and later indicated that additional tour dates would be added. On 16 March, the reunion was cancelled after Fraser announced that she would not take part. In a 2009 interview, Fraser said she could not go through the pain of sharing the stage with her former lover Guthrie, the issue behind the band's 1997 breakup. Raymonde revealed that the band had also booked a 55-date world tour, which would have paid him £1.5 million. In 2005, 4AD released a limited edition of 10,000 compilation box set titled Lullabies to Violaine, a 4-disc set that includes every single and EP released from 1982 to 1996. This was shortly followed up by two 2-disc sets of the same names, known as Volume 1 and Volume 2. In 2012, "Cherry-Coloured Funk", "Pitch the Baby", and "Frou-Frou Foxes in Midsummer Fires" which featured on Heaven or Las Vegas (1990), were performed live by lead singer Elizabeth Fraser during her Meltdown Festival solo performances. Each of the three songs featured new musical arrangements during Fraser's performances at the festival.

In 2005, Fraser worked with Breton musician Yann Tiersen on two songs for his album Les Retrouvailles. Since March 2007, the band has started podcasts of exclusive material. On 6 October 2008 Cocteau Twins were awarded the Q Awards Inspiration Award, which they accepted in a rare collective live appearance. In 2009, Fraser released the single "Moses" on Rough Trade. Guthrie has released six solo albums—Imperial, Continental, Carousel, Emeralds, Fortune, and Pearldiving—and eight EPs. He toured extensively with his band Violet Indiana, which included ex-Cocteau Twins guitarist Mitsuo Tate. He has also scored the music for three movies—Gregg Araki's Mysterious Skin (in collaboration with Harold Budd), Dany Saadia's 3:19 Nada Es Casualidad (a Mexican/Spanish production), and again with Gregg Araki and Harold Budd on the score and the soundtrack of White Bird in a Blizzard. He reunited with Budd to collaborate on two companion albums, Before the Day Breaks and After the Night Falls, and the albums Bordeaux, Winter Garden (a collaboration that included Italian electronica artist Eraldo Bernocchi), and Another Flower, which was released after Budd's death in 2020. In 2006, Guthrie produced three songs on Mahogany's Connectivity. He also produced and played guitar on Apollo Heights debut album, White Music for Black People.

In 2022, Fraser, Guthrie and Raymonde were awarded with the Visionary Award by The Ivors Academy. Fraser and Guthrie attended the award ceremony in London in May 2022. In 2023, Guthrie remastered the albums Four-Calendar Café and Milk & Kisses, which was later re-released under an exclusive license by their former record label, 4AD, in 2024 on vinyl, compact disc, and digital formats.

== Musical style and legacy ==
"The Spangle Maker"
Sample of "The Spangle Maker", (1984)

Cocteau Twins' early recordings were classified in the gothic rock and post-punk genres. The band's influences at the time they formed included The Birthday Party (drummer Phill Calvert encouraged the group to sign to 4AD), Sex Pistols, Kate Bush and Siouxsie and the Banshees (Fraser had Siouxsie tattoos on her arms for several years). The band was named after the early Simple Minds song "The Cocteau Twins" (later rewritten as "No Cure") with a reference to a Jean Cocteau novel. As the band's sound developed, their subsequent music was classified as dream pop, and darkwave. Fraser's vocals included invented or unknown words, sometimes ones she found in foreign language books, adding to the band's dreamy ambience.

Cocteau Twins' music has influenced numerous artists in different genres, including Slowdive, Ride, Cigarettes After Sex, Quicksand, Deftones, the Weeknd, Napalm Death, John Grant, and Prince.

The Guardian described their music as "the gold standard for enigmatic, ethereal indie-pop", citing their ability to "emerge fully formed from the post-punk shadows".

Music critic Rob Morton of The New York Sun wrote, "With their impenetrable lyrics and intense privacy, the band quickly developed an aura of mystique. The Twins were largely responsible for defining the 4AD aesthetic in the late 1980s, they have proven hugely influential over the years, and they have been namechecked by artists as diverse as Prince, Madonna, and My Bloody Valentine".

== Members ==
- Elizabeth Fraser – vocals, lyrics (1981–1997)
- Robin Guthrie – guitars, bass, keyboards, production, drum machine (1979–1997)
- Will Heggie – bass (1979–1983)
- Simon Raymonde – bass, keyboards (1983–1997)

=== Touring contributors ===
- Ben Blakeman – additional guitars (1990–1994)
- Mitsuo Tate – additional guitars (1989–1996)
- Benny Di Massa – drums (1994–1996)
- David Palfreeman – percussion (1993–1996)

== Discography ==
- Garlands (1982)
- Head over Heels (1983)
- Treasure (1984)
- Victorialand (1986)
- The Moon and the Melodies (1986, with Harold Budd)
- Blue Bell Knoll (1988)
- Heaven or Las Vegas (1990)
- Four-Calendar Café (1993)
- Milk & Kisses (1996)

== Awards and nominations ==
Cocteau Twins received several awards in recognition of their contribution to music. In 2008, the band received the Q Awards' Inspiration Award, which Elizabeth Fraser described as the first award the group had won. In 2022, the band received the Visionary Award from the Ivors Academy, recognising their innovative contribution to music and songwriting. That same year, their 1990 album Heaven or Las Vegas received the Modern Scottish Classic Award at the Scottish Album of the Year Award.

Year	Organisation	Award	Recipient	Result
2008	Q Awards	Inspiration Award	Cocteau Twins	Won
2022	The Ivors Academy	Visionary Award	Cocteau Twins	Won
2022	Scottish Album of the Year Award	Modern Scottish Classic Award	Heaven or Las Vegas	Won

== Sources ==
- Heim, Scott (ed) . The First Time I Heard Cocteau Twins. Rosecliff Press, 2012
- Aston, Martin (2013). Facing the Other Way: The Story of 4AD. London: The Friday Project. ISBN 978-0-00-748961-9.
- Oliver, Vaughan; Poynor, Rick (2000). Vaughan Oliver: Visceral Pleasures. London: Booth-Clibborn Editions. ISBN 1-86154-072-8.
- Raymonde, Simon (2024). In One Ear: Cocteau Twins, Ivor Raymonde and Me. London: Nine Eight Books. ISBN 978-1-78870-938-5.
