= 1983–1991 =

Box set by This Mortal Coil
- Released: March 30, 1993
- Recorded: 1983–1991
- Genres: Dream pop; gothic rock
- Length: 4:34:29
- Label: 4AD
- Producers: Ivo Watts-Russell and John Fryer

This Mortal Coil chronology
Blood (1991)	1983–1991 (1993)	This Mortal Coil (2011)

1983–1991 is a four-CD box set of material by supergroup This Mortal Coil, released on March 30, 1993 on the 4AD label. The box set was released only in the United States, and was distributed by Warner Bros. Records, with whom 4AD maintained a distribution deal at the time. This marked the first domestic American release for most of the band's output, as only the debut album, It'll End in Tears, had been released in the United States previously.

The box set contains all three of the band's LPs, presented in their original form, with no bonus tracks or extra material. The fourth CD is entitled Original Versions, and features 21 of the original recordings of many songs the band covered.

The box set was designed by 4AD design associates V23, and is dedicated to His Name Is Alive frontman Warren Defever.

== Background and recording ==
Ivo Watts-Russell and John Fryer had produced the albums with Fryer as the recording engineer.

== Track listing ==
Disc one
It'll End in Tears
Disc two
Filigree & Shadow
Disc three
Blood
Disc four

Original Versions
No.	Title	Original artist	Length
1.	"Another Day"	Roy Harper	2:58
2.	"Mr. Somewhere"	The Apartments	2:50
3.	"With Tomorrow"	Gene Clark	2:21
4.	"Holocaust"	Big Star	3:48
5.	"Kangaroo"	Big Star	3:44
6.	"Carolyn's Song"	Rain Parade	4:04
7.	"I Want to Live"	Gary Ogan & Bill Lamb	4:42
8.	"Alone (On Piano)"	Colin Newman	1:56
9.	"Drugs"	Talking Heads	5:09
10.	"Help Me Lift You Up"	Mary Margaret O'Hara	4:36
11.	"Song to the Siren"	Tim Buckley	3:25
12.	"Morning Glory"	Tim Buckley	2:49
13.	"I Must Have Been Blind"	Tim Buckley	3:42
14.	"Several Times"	Pieter Nooten & Michael Brook	2:01
15.	"The Jeweller"	Pearls Before Swine	2:45
16.	"I Come and Stand at Every Door"	The Byrds	3:00
17.	"I Am the Cosmos"	Chris Bell	3:48
18.	"You and Your Sister"	Chris Bell	3:11
19.	"'Til I Gain Control Again"	Emmylou Harris	5:32
20.	"Nature's Way"	Spirit	2:28
21.	"Strength of Strings"	Gene Clark	6:31
