= Shelleyan Orphan =

British alternative music group

- Genres: Alternative rock, dream pop, chamber pop, baroque pop
- Labels: Rough Trade, Columbia, One Little Indian
- Past members: Caroline Crawley; Jemaur Tayle

Shelleyan Orphan were a British alternative music group that came to prominence in the 1980s and early 1990s. They played a style of pop influenced by chamber music, and which featured dual male-female vocals.

== Career ==
In 1980, Caroline Crawley and Jemaur Tayle met in Bournemouth, England, where they discovered a mutual appreciation of poet Percy Bysshe Shelley. Two years later, after taking the name Shelleyan Orphan from the Shelley poem Spirit of Solitude, the pair moved to London to seek out orchestral elements to add to their voices.

In June 1984, the band got their first break and landed a session with Kid Jensen for BBC Radio 1. The band signed with Rough Trade Records in 1986, and released the singles, "Cavalry of Cloud" and "Anatomy of Love".

In 1987, the band released their first of four albums: Helleborine. Named after the Helleborine orchid said to have the power to cure madness, the album was recorded at Abbey Road Studios with producer Haydn Bendall. Helleborine included an assortment of guest musicians including Stuart Elliott (the drummer for Kate Bush), and Kate's brother Paddy Bush.

In 1989, they released Century Flower. So called after a flower that blooms only once in its lifetime, this album was intended to mark "an event which affects enormous change, maybe once in a century: on a world scale, the atomic bomb: on a personal level, the death of someone close to you". Produced by David M. Allen, the band's sound caught the ear of The Cure's Robert Smith, who invited the band to accompany them on their Prayer Tour. While on that tour, Caroline Crawley began a relationship with Cure drummer Boris Williams.

In 1991, the band received another break when Crawley was approached by 4AD Records founder Ivo Watts-Russell who asked her to appear on four tracks of This Mortal Coil's Blood. Crawley was permitted to do her own interpretations of the tracks, and appeared in the video for the Syd Barrett cover, "Late Night". With Jem Tayle, Shelleyan Orphan recorded and released tracks for several compilation albums during this period.

In 1992, Shelleyan Orphan returned with their album Humroot. Named after Tayle's childhood dog, Humroot was recorded by Bill Buchanan, and the band were joined by Boris Williams, Porl Thompson (The Cure) and Roberto Soave (Presence).

Shortly after Humroot's release, Shelleyan Orphan disbanded. Tayle formed his own band, Elephantine, and Crawley, along with Williams and Soave, formed Babacar. Soon after, Tayle joined Babacar as a full-time member, though not contributing to the songwriting.

In 2000, the band reunited to record a cover of Tim Buckley's "Buzzin' Fly" for Sing a Song for You: A Tribute to Tim Buckley.

A new album, entitled We Have Everything We Need, was released in October 2008 on One Little Indian Records.

In October 2016 Caroline Crawley died after a long illness.

In 2025 Jem Tayle released the album Vamberator, a collaboration with the ex-Cure drummer Boris Williams.

== Discography ==
=== Albums ===
- Helleborine Rough Trade, May 1987 (LP/CD) - UK Indie No. 5
- Helleborine (US Version) Columbia, 1988 (LP/CD)
- Century Flower Rough Trade, May 1989 (CD) - UK Indie No. 19
- Century Flower (US Version) Columbia, 1989 (CD)
- Humroot Columbia/Rough Trade, March 1992 (CD)
- We Have Everything We Need One Little Indian, 2008 (CD)

=== Singles ===
- "Cavalry of Cloud" Rough Trade, September 1986 (7"/12")
- "Anatomy of Love" Rough Trade, April 1987 (7"/12") - UK Indie No. 12
- "Shatter" Rough Trade, July 1989 (7"/12") - US Billboard Modern Rock Tracks No. 23

=== Promotional EP ===
- Cavalry of Cloud Rough Trade, 1986 (CD)
- Century Flower (Japanese Promo) Columbia, 1990 (CD)
- Waking Up Columbia/Rough Trade, 1992 (CD)

=== Compilation album appearances ===
- "Suffer Dog" The Liberator, Artists for Animals Deltic Records, 1989 (CD)
- "Ice" on Acoustic Christmas Columbia/Sony, 1990 (CD)
- "Shatter" on Rough Trade Summer Collection 1991 (Brazilian Rough Trade compilation with acts such as James, Pere Ubu, AR Kane and others)
- "Who Loves the Sun" on Heaven & Hell - A Tribute To The Velvet Underground (Volume Two) Imaginary Records, 1991 (CD)
- "Joey" on Brittle Days - A Tribute To Nick Drake Imaginary Records, 1992 (CD)
- "Burst" on Pick This Epic Records, 1992 (CD)
- "Ice" on A Different Kind of Christmas Risky Business, 1994 (CD)
- "Buzzin' Fly" on Sing a Song for You: A Tribute to Tim Buckley Manifesto Records, 2000 (CD)
