= Breathless (band) =

English band

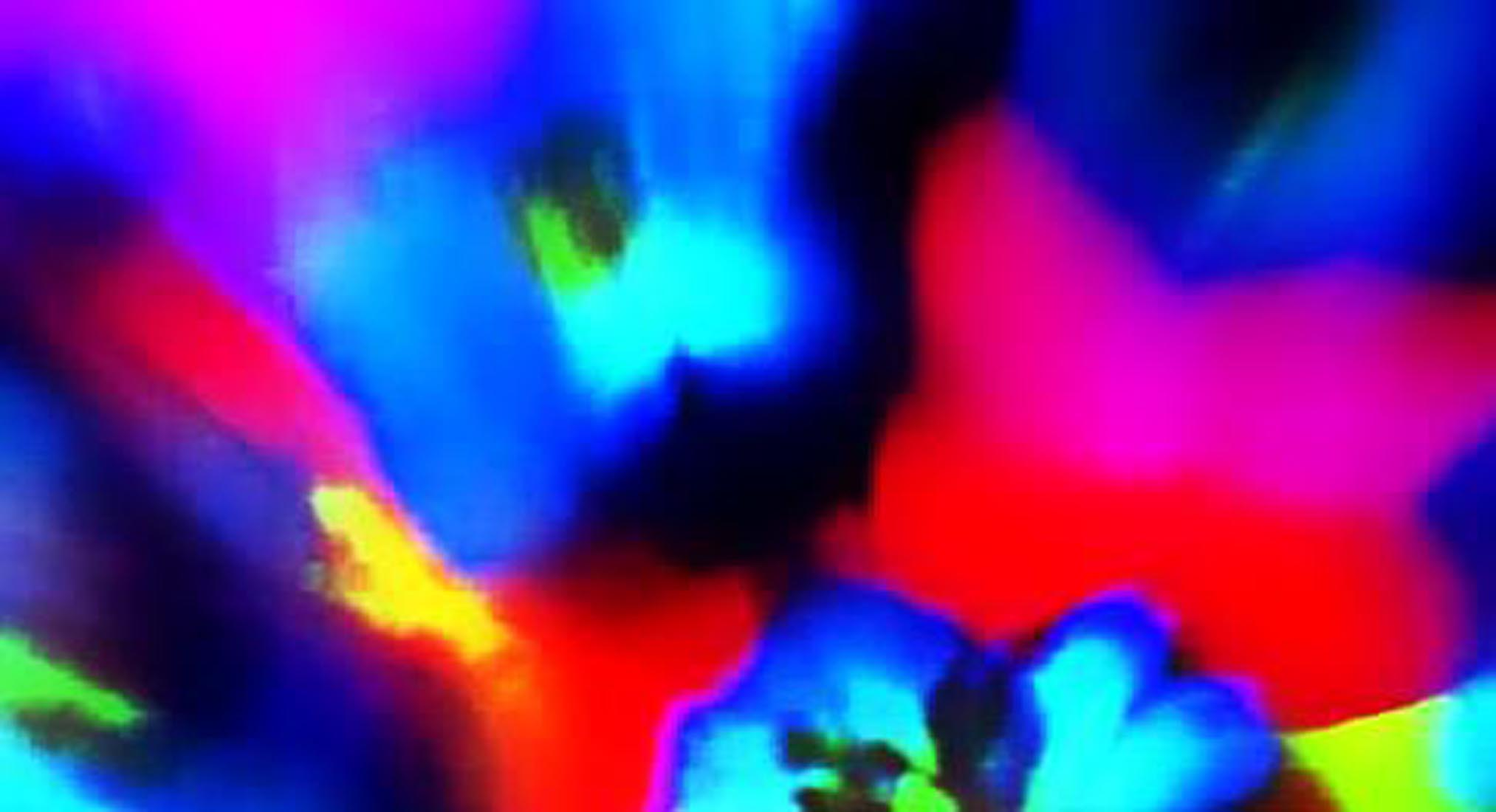
- Tenor Vossa photo by Ari Neufeld

Background information
- Origin: London, England
- Genres: Post-punk, dream pop, indie rock, shoegazing, gothic rock
- Years active: 1983–present
- Label: Tenor Vossa
- Members: Dominic Appleton; Ari Neufeld; Gary Mundy; Tristram Latimer Sayer
- Past members: Martyn Watts
- Website: tenorvossa.co.uk

Breathless are an English dream pop band formed in 1983 by Dominic Appleton (vocals, keyboards), Gary Mundy (guitar), Ari Neufeld (bass) and Tristram Latimer Sayer (drums). Across nearly four decades, Breathless have released eight studio albums, one compilation album and 14 singles and EPs, all on their own label, Tenor Vossa Records.

Their music has been described as "melancholic", with AllMusic's Ned Raggett calling the band "underappreciated" and saying "the majority of Breathless' work has squarely fit into a lush vein of haunting, epic music unafraid of a moody theatricality".

Appleton is also known for his vocal contributions in 4AD supergroup This Mortal Coil, appearing on three tracks on their 1986 album Filigree & Shadow, and one track on their 1991 album Blood.

== History ==
=== Formation and first recordings (1983–1986) ===
Dominic Appleton and Gary Mundy knew each other from school and had played earlier in a group called A Cruel Memory. Appleton met bassist Ari Neufeld while working at London's Virgin Megastore. Neufeld recruited Appleton as a keyboardist for a band she was currently in, but the two soon realized that while they were happy making music together, the band as a whole didn't please them. They split away from the group and started working on songs, with Appleton taking over vocal duties and suggesting Mundy for the guitarist role. The name "Breathless" was taken from Jean-Luc Godard's French New Wave film of the same name.

In April 1984, Breathless released their first single, "Waterland"/"Second Heaven". The band recorded "Waterland", "Second Heaven", and an unreleased song entitled "The First Issue" at Denmark Street Studios in London two weeks after drummer Tristram Latimer Sayer joined the band. They recorded a follow-up to their debut single with "Ageless", a three-song 12" single released in November 1984. The sessions for the single actually yielded an entire album's worth of songs, but according to Neufeld, "We were young [and] inexperienced in recording", and the band ultimately was disappointed in all but three of the songs recorded. The recording sessions at Alvic Studios in West London marked the first time the band would work with engineer/producer Drostan Madden, who had been recommended to Breathless by 4AD's boss Ivo Watts-Russell. The EP Two Days from Eden followed in August 1985, prior to their debut album, The Glass Bead Game, which was issued in June 1986. The band recorded with John Fryer at Blackwing Studios in London. Another EP, Nailing Colours to the Wheel, was released in November 1986.

=== Three Times and Waving to Heartburst (1987–1994) ===
While recording their sophomore studio album, Three Times and Waving, drummer Latimer Sayer left the band. He was subsequently replaced by Martyn Watts, who played on four tracks on the album (the other five tracks feature drumming from Latimer Sayer). Three Times and Waving was released in November 1987, and the album cover features a 1961 painting from Jean Dubuffet entitled "Spinning Round". The year 1989 saw Breathless release their third album Chasing Promises and the follow-up single "I Never Know Where You Are". According to Neufeld, the band had originally intended to use a re-recorded version of Chasing Promises album track "Moment by Moment" for release as a single, but were "so pleased" with the recording of new track "I Never Know Where You Are" that they decided to make the song the A-side. The song would also feature prominently on the band's next album as the opening track.

The double A-side single "Always"/"Flowers Die" was released in the summer of 1990; the former was a non-album track, while the latter—a cover version of a song originally by the Only Ones—would also feature on their fourth album. Neufeld said, "We felt that we wanted a slightly rawer, less produced sound for our next record and decided to have a change of scene and go back to recording with Drostan [Madden]", so the band produced their fourth album, Between Happiness and Heartache, with Madden and Ken Gardener at Rooster and Blackwing Studios. The album was released in October 1991, while the first proper single, "Over and Over"/"All That Matters Now", followed in November. A music video was also produced for "Over and Over", directed by Damon Heath.

A compilation of tracks recorded between 1983 and 1993 was issued as Heartburst in March 1994, preceded by the 1993 non-album single "Don't Just Disappear". The band took a recording hiatus after the release of "Don't Just Disappear" and did not release any new music until mid-1999.

=== Blue Moon, Behind the Light and Green to Blue (1999–2013) ===
Breathless re-emerged in 1999 with their fifth album Blue Moon, an album featuring a more prominent drone rock influence. Two singles were released from the album: "Magic Lamp" in June 1999, and "Walk Down to the Water"/"Goodnight" in June 2000. The following album Behind the Light was released in June 2003 and continued the band's sonic foray into space and drone rock. In 2006, Martyn Watts announced his departure from the band, but in 2011 Breathless announced the return of original drummer Latimer Sayer. The seventh Breathless studio album, Green to Blue, was released in November 2012, issued as a double album. Green to Blue was the first new recording from the band following a nine-year hiatus, and features special guest and This Mortal Coil/4AD alumna Heidi Berry providing backing vocals on album track "Just for Today".

=== Reissues, reemergence and See Those Colours Fly (2016–present) ===
Breathless reissued Blue Moon as an expanded double CD and a first-time pressing on double vinyl in February 2016, followed by reissues of The Glass Bead Game in May 2020 and Between Happiness and Heartache in July 2021.

After nearly ten years of recording inactivity, the band announced their eighth studio album, entitled See Those Colours Fly, which was eventually released on 29 July 2022. The album was mixed by Kramer, and was self-produced. Ari Neufeld provided drum programming in lieu of live drums on the album; in an interview with Silent Radio, she explained, "This certainly wasn't intentional. We had just come back from Italy where we had been playing some of the new songs and a couple of days before we were due to go into the studio to record the first one, we heard that our drummer Tristram [Latimer Sayer] had been in a really bad car accident and was in a coma. I think we thought if we go ahead and record, it will mean he will be OK and can add his drums later. This isn't as irrational as it sounds, as on our last album Green to Blue, we recorded everything to a click track and then added the real drums last. Thankfully Tristram is better, and I hope will be able to drum with us in the future. At the same time I was starting to learn how to use Logic and programme drums. At the beginning it was just so we had something comfortable to play along to at rehearsal, but eventually we really got into it and it really suited our way of working." See Those Colours Fly was released to positive reviews, with The Big Takeover stating, "while progress on the group's eighth album was unavoidably delayed by a stroke of cruel misfortune – not to mention the realities of the global pandemic – the finished work is one of their finest, brimming with melody, transfigured by its long period of gestation and the changes fate imposed on their creative process."

== Side projects ==
Between 1986 and 1991, Appleton was asked by 4AD label founder Ivo Watts-Russell to contribute vocals to the 4AD supergroup This Mortal Coil, appearing on three tracks on their 1986 sophomore album, Filigree & Shadow ("The Jeweller", "Tarantula" and "Strength of Strings"), and one track on their 1991 album Blood ("I Am the Cosmos"). Appleton was one of a select few artists to contribute to This Mortal Coil who was not a 4AD signing. Watts-Russell said of Appleton, "Without exaggeration Dominic Appleton is by far my favourite living male vocalist. He has such a beautiful, sad voice and comes up with melodies that do the same".

Prior to Breathless, Appleton and Mundy played keyboards and guitar, respectively, on Anne Clark's 1982 debut album, The Sitting Room.

Breathless established their own record label, Tenor Vossa Records, to release their material. Tenor Vossa's roster has also included releases from Richard Warren, Laymar, Beat Milk Jugs, Bender, Scenic, Moly, Your Black Star and photographer Steve Gullick's musical project Tenebrous Liar.

== Influences ==
In a 2012 interview with online magazine Pennyblackmusic, Appleton told interviewer Carl Brookstein that the band's shared influences include Pink Floyd, the Velvet Underground, the Only Ones, Can, Cocteau Twins and Brian Eno. He told Brookstein that he was "very caught up in the music being put out by 4AD" in the 1980s, including Rema-Rema, Mass, the Wolfgang Press, Cocteau Twins and Dead Can Dance, even prior to participating with the label's supergroup This Mortal Coil. He said, "Hearing 'Song to the Siren' for the first time was a monumental moment for me, and It'll End in Tears was stunning... This Mortal Coil are there in the Breathless melting pot, music that's so beautiful and fragile". Appleton noted a preference for female singers, citing Elizabeth Fraser and Billie Holiday as key vocal influences, while hailing Kate Bush as having "the most amazing musical imagination". He also said, "I am not a huge fan of many male singers, but I think John Grant has a stunning voice and I've listened to David Sylvian since I was a teenager". He further cited the Only Ones' Peter Perrett as his favourite lyricist, and Mark Cox of Mass and the Wolfgang Press as his favourite keyboard player. Appleton also noted Peter Hook and Jah Wobble as influences on Neufeld's bass playing, and Tom Verlaine, Neil Young, Maurice Deebank and John Perry as guitarist Mundy's top influences.

In the 2012 interview with Pennyblackmusic, Appleton said that his lyrics are autobiographical. "I find it really hard to sing about things that aren't real or I can't relate to", he said. In a 2016 interview with Pennyblackmusic, Appleton acknowledged the band's melancholy sound, saying, "I think that's what Breathless do best. In the past people have criticised us for our melancholy sound and I felt defensive about it and tried to justify it. I just don't care now, the fact is that's what we do and what I love about what we do. The bulk of the music I listen to is melancholy and I know Ari and Gary are the same. I listen to pop music too when I feel like it and I enjoy it a lot but it's a different kind of listening. I don't understand why people find melancholia a negative thing in music. I think it's positive, it's reflective and thoughtful, it's complex and it's wonderfully indulgent and emotional. It's not wallowing in self-pity, it's losing yourself in self-reflection and nostalgia".

== Members ==
Current members

- Dominic Appleton – vocals, keyboards (1983–present)
- Ari Neufeld – bass, additional guitar, drums (1983–present)
- Gary Mundy – guitars, additional vocals (1983–present)
- Tristram Latimer Sayer – drums, percussion (1983-1987, 2011–present)

Former members

- Martyn Watts – drums, percussion (1987-2006)

== Discography ==
=== Albums ===
Year	Title	Track listing
1986	The Glass Bead Game: Released: June 1986; Label: Tenor Vossa (BREATH4); Formats: LP, CD; Reissued: 17 January 2020 (vinyl LP), 22 May 2020 (CD)	Track listing: No. / Title / Length; 1. / "Across the Water" / 4:55; 2. / "All My Eye and Betty Martin" / 5:23; 3. / "Count on Angels" / 4:39; 4. / "Monkey Talk" / 7:31; 5. / "Every Road Leads Home" / 3:54; 6. / "Touchstone" / 5:22; 7. / "Sense of Purpose" / 4:20; 8. / "See How the Land Lies" / 6:28; 9. / "Stone Harvest" (CD bonus track) / 6:13
1987	Three Times and Waving: Released: 26 October 1987; Label: Tenor Vossa (BREATH6); Formats: LP, CD	Track listing: No. / Title / Length; 1. / "Sold Down the River" / 3:19; 2. / "Is It Good News Today?" / 4:53; 3. / "Three Times and Waving" / 3:20; 4. / "Into the Fire" / 4:13; 5. / "Working for Space" / 3:46; 6. / "Waiting on the Wire" / 5:11; 7. / "Dizzy Life" / 4:14; 8. / "Say September Sings" / 4:00; 9. / "Let's Make a Night of It" / 7:22
1989	Chasing Promises: Released: 22 May 1989; Label: Tenor Vossa (BREATH7) (UK); Troy Records (TROY005) (US); Formats: LP, CD	Track listing: No. / Title / Length; 1. / "Compulsion" / 6:51; 2. / "Here by Chance" / 6:25; 3. / "Better Late Than Never" / 6:52; 4. / "Heartburst" / 4:52; 5. / "Moment by Moment" / 6:25; 6. / "Smash Palace" / 4:08; 7. / "Sometimes on Sunday" / 6:47; 8. / "Glow" / 5:30; 9. / "Ageless" (U.S. CD bonus track) / 6:41; 10. / "Pride" (U.S. CD bonus track) / 6:58
1991	Between Happiness and Heartache: Released: October 1991; Label: Tenor Vossa (BREATH10); Formats: LP, CD; Reissued: 16 October 2006 (enhanced CD with bonus track, music video for "Over and Over", and black-and-white cover art); 15 July 2021 (pink-coloured vinyl LP)	Track listing: No. / Title / Length; 1. / "I Never Know Where You Are" / 5:43; 2. / "Over and Over" / 4:14; 3. / "Wave After Wave" / 5:22; 4. / "You Can Call It Yours" / 5:57; 5. / "All That Matters Now" / 6:03; 6. / "Clearer Than Daylight" / 3:48; 7. / "Flowers Die" (written by Peter Perrett) / 4:29; 8. / "Help Me Get Over It" / 5:09; 9. / "Everything I See" (2006 CD reissue bonus track) / 5:51
1999	Blue Moon: Released: 25 June 1999; Label: Tenor Vossa (BREATH15/16); Formats: CD, limited edition 2CD; Reissued: 12 February 2016; Formats: 2CD, 2LP (with bonus tracks)	Original release track listing: No. / Title / Length; 1. / "Walk Down to the Water" / 7:19; 2. / "Magic Lamp" / 7:24; 3. / "Viva" / 3:44; 4. / "Goodnight" / 6:58; 5. / "Green Finger Swinger" / 4:49; 6. / "Come Reassure Me" / 6:29; 7. / "All the Reasons Slide" / 6:42; 8. / "Drifting" / 2:22; 9. / "Ballroom" / 3:08; 10. / "No Answered Prayers" / 10:19; 1999 bonus disc track listing: No. / Title / Length; 1. / "Moonstone Part 1" / 27:01; 2. / "Moonstone Part 2" / 22:23; 2016 reissue CD1/LP1 track listing: No. / Title / Length; 1. / "Walk Down to the Water" / 7:19; 2. / "Magic Lamp" / 7:24; 3. / "Viva" / 3:44; 4. / "Goodnight" / 6:58; 5. / "Green Finger Swinger" / 4:49; 6. / "Come Reassure Me" / 6:29; 2016 reissue CD2/LP2 track listing: No. / Title / Length; 7. / "All the Reasons Slide" / 6:42; 8. / "Drifting" / 2:22; 9. / "Ballroom" / 3:08; 10. / "No Answered Prayers" / 10:19; 11. / "Moonstone 3" (bonus track) / 12:50; 12. / "Blue Moon" (bonus track) / 4:47
2003	Behind the Light: Released: 16 June 2003; Label: Tenor Vossa (BREATH19); Format: CD	Track listing: No. / Title / Length; 1. / "After All These Years" / 3:58; 2. / "And So the Dream Goes On" / 5:54; 3. / "Stay Beside You" / 4:46; 4. / "Nobody Knows" / 3:54; 5. / "Rising" / 4:44; 6. / "Behind the Light": I. "Closer"; II. "You Never Left Me"; III. "Closer Still"; IV. "Always with You" / 13:46; 7. / "Fade" / 3:54
2012	Green to Blue: Released: 26 November 2012; Label: Tenor Vossa (BREATH20); Formats: 2CD, 2LP	CD1/LP1 track listing: No. / Title / Length; 1. / "Please Be Happy" / 6:08; 2. / "I Want You to Realise" / 3:09; 3. / "Next Time You Fall" / 6:01; 4. / "Everything Is Us" / 3:29; 5. / "It's Good to See You" / 6:46; 6. / "Walk Away" / 11:24; CD2/LP2 track listing: No. / Title / Length; 7. / "Rain Down Now" / 4:08; 8. / "Fade Away" / 8:20; 9. / "The Same Rooms Without You" / 4:29; 10. / "Just for Today" / 8:15; 11. / "The Last Light of Day" / 7:05
2022	See Those Colours Fly: Released: 29 July 2022; Label: Tenor Vossa (BREATH24); Formats: CD, red-coloured LP	Track listing: No. / Title / Length; 1. / "Looking for the Words" / 4:20; 2. / "The Party's Not Over" / 4:30; 3. / "My Heart and I" / 5:12; 4. / "We Should Go Driving" / 4:12; 5. / "Let Me Down Gently" / 4:51; 6. / "The City Never Sleeps" / 5:24; 7. / "Somewhere Out of Reach" / 5:35; 8. / "So Far from Love" / 4:05; 9. / "I Watch You Sleep" / 7:19

=== Compilation albums ===
Year
1994
Title
Heartburst
- Released: 28 March 1994
- Label: Tenor Vossa (BREATH13);
  compilation of tracks 1983-1993
- Format: CD
Details

Track listing
No.	Title	Length
1.	"Don't Just Disappear" (Radio Edit)	3:58
2.	"You Can Call It Yours"	5:57
3.	"I Never Know Where You Are"	5:43
4.	"All That Matters Now"	6:01
5.	"Always"	3:37
6.	"Over and Over"	4:11
7.	"Waiting on the Wire"	5:12
8.	"Wave After Wave"	5:23
9.	"Ageless"	6:42
10.	"Pride"	7:01
11.	"All My Eye and Betty Martin"	5:24
12.	"Touchstone"	5:22
13.	"Don't Just Disappear" (Long Version)	5:46

=== Singles and EPs ===
Year	Single	Details
1984	"Waterland"/"Second Heaven": Released: April 1984; Label: Tenor Vossa (BREATH1)	7" track listing: No. / Title / Length; 1. / "Waterland" / 3:53; 2. / "Second Heaven" / 4:45
1984	"Ageless": Released: November 1984; Label: Tenor Vossa (BREATH2)	12" track listing: No. / Title / Length; 1. / "Ageless" / 6:41; 2. / "A New Chapter" / 3:46; 3. / "Fallen Dreams" / 4:47
1985	Two Days from Eden EP: Released: August 1985; Label: Tenor Vossa (BREATH3)	12" track listing: No. / Title / Length; 1. / "Pride" / 7:01; 2. / "Across the Water" / 4:50; 3. / "Stone Harvest" / 6:13; 4. / "Like Knives" / 3:37
1986	Nailing Colours to the Wheel EP: Released: November 1986; Label: Tenor Vossa (BREATH5)	12" track listing: No. / Title / Length; 1. / "Bad Blood" / 4:34; 2. / "Waiting on the Wire" / 5:11; 3. / "Count on Angels" / 4:39; 4. / "The Warmest Kiss" / 5:04
1989	"I Never Know Where You Are": Released: October 1989; Label: Tenor Vossa (BREATH8)	12" track listing: No. / Title / Length; 1. / "I Never Know Where You Are" / 5:43; 2. / "Moment by Moment" (Version) / 5:55; 3. / "Heartburst" / 4:52
1990	"Always"/"Flowers Die": Released: July 1990; Label: Tenor Vossa (BREATH9)	7" & 12" track listing: No. / Title / Length; 1. / "Always" / 3:37; 2. / "Flowers Die" (written by Peter Perrett) / 4:29
1991	"Over and Over"/"All That Matters Now": Released: November 1991; Label: Tenor Vossa (BREATH11)	CD track listing: No. / Title / Length; 1. / "Over and Over" / 4:15; 2. / "All That Matters Now" / 6:04; 3. / "Waiting on the Wire" / 5:15; 4. / "Moment by Moment" (Version) / 5:55
1993	"Don't Just Disappear": Released: July 1993; Label: Tenor Vossa (BREATH12)	CD track listing: No. / Title / Length; 1. / "Don't Just Disappear" (Long Version) / 5:45; 2. / "Everything I See" / 5:50; 3. / "Don't Just Disappear" (Radio Edit) / 3:58
1999	"Magic Lamp": Released: 28 June 1999; Label: Tenor Vossa (BREATH14)	CD & 7" track listing: No. / Title / Length; 1. / "Magic Lamp" (Edit) / 4:46; 2. / "Blue Moon" / 4:47
2000	"Walk Down to the Water"/"Goodnight": Released: June 2000; Label: Tenor Vossa (BREATH17)	CD track listing: No. / Title / Length; 1. / "Walk Down to the Water" (Edit) / 4:00; 2. / "Goodnight" / 7:04; 3. / "Moonstone Part 3" / 12:50
2003	"After All These Years": Released: April 2003; Label: Tenor Vossa (BREATH18)	CD track listing: No. / Title / Length; 1. / "After All These Years" / 3:49; 2. / "Solar Blue" / 5:25; 3. / "Ribbon Waves" / 9:54
2012	"Next Time You Fall"/"I Want You to Realise": Released: 19 November 2012; Label: Tenor Vossa (promo-only; BREATH21)	CD-R track listing: No. / Title / Length; 1. / "Next Time You Fall" (Edit) / 3:37; 2. / "I Want You to Realise" / 3:09; 3. / "Next Time You Fall" (Album Version) / 6:02
2013	"Please Be Happy": Released: 20 April 2013; Label: Tenor Vossa (BREATH22)	12" track listing: No. / Title / Length; 1. / "Please Be Happy" (Edit) / 3:37; 2. / "The Same Rooms Without You" (Readers Wife Remix) / 5:13; 3. / "Next Time You Fall" (Jim Sclavunos Remix) / 3:14; 4. / "Please Be Happy" (Album Version) / 6:09
2022	"We Should Go Driving": Released: 15 July 2022; Label: Tenor Vossa (BREATHDIG25)	Digital download: No. / Title / Length; 1. / "We Should Go Driving" / 4:12

=== Music videos ===
Year	Video	Director	Link
1991	"Over and Over"	Damon Heath	YouTube
1993	"Don't Just Disappear"		YouTube
2012	"Next Time You Fall"	Harry Wright	YouTube
2012	"I Want You to Realise"	Harry Wright	YouTube
2013	"Please Be Happy"	David Masters	YouTube
2015	"Walk Down to the Water"	Ari Neufeld	YouTube
2022	"We Should Go Driving"	Ari Neufeld	YouTube
