= Filigree & Shadow =

1986 album by This Mortal Coil

Studio album by This Mortal Coil
- Released: 22 September 1986
- Studios: Blackwing (London); Palladium (Edinburgh)
- Genres: Dream pop; art rock
- Length: 74:13
- Label: 4AD
- Producers: John Fryer and Ivo Watts-Russell

This Mortal Coil chronology
It'll End in Tears (1984)	Filigree & Shadow (1986)	Blood (1991)

Singles from Filigree & Shadow
- 1. "Come Here My Love"/"Drugs" Released: 1 September 1986

Professional ratings
Review scores
Source	Rating
AllMusic	4.5/5 stars
Pitchfork	8.7/10

Filigree & Shadow is the second album by the 4AD collective This Mortal Coil. Released in September 1986, the album features a loose grouping of guest musicians and vocalists brought together by label boss Ivo Watts-Russell, most of whom are from the 4AD roster.

== Background and recording ==
Watts-Russell and John Fryer had produced the album, with Fryer and John Turner as the recording engineers.

Of the 25 tracks, 13 are instrumental, including the title track. This was the first double-LP released on 4AD, and introduced the "DAD" (for double album) prefix into the label's catalogue. Watts-Russell took careful consideration in shaping the album's four sides so they flowed together as individual wholes. This is lost somewhat on compact disc, as the entire album fits on one CD.

== Release ==
The album entered the UK Independent Music chart on 11 October 1986 and peaked at number 2, spending 16 weeks on the chart in total. A remastered and repackaged CD edition of Filigree & Shadow was issued with the complete This Mortal Coil recordings in a self-titled box set, released in late November 2011. The CD was released individually shortly thereafter.

== Track listing ==
=== Double vinyl LP (DAD 609) ===
Side 1
No.	Title	Writer(s)	Interpreted by	Length
1.	"Velvet Belly"	Martin McCarrick	Martin McCarrick, Gini Ball	1:19
2.	"The Jeweller"	Tom Rapp	Dominic Appleton, Deirdre and Louise Rutkowski, Simon Raymonde, Martin McCarrick, Gini Ball	3:15
3.	"Ivy and Neet"	Simon Raymonde	Simon Raymonde, Richard Thomas, Martin McCarrick, Gini Ball	4:48
4.	"Meniscus"	David Curtis	David Curtis	2:28
5.	"Tears"	Simon Raymonde	Martin McCarrick	0:21
6.	"Tarantula"	Martyn Young, Ian Robbins	Dominic Appleton, Deirdre and Louise Rutkowski, Jon Turner, Martin McCarrick, Gini Ball	4:58

Side 2
No.	Title	Writer(s)	Interpreted by	Length
1.	"My Father"	Judy Collins	Alison Limerick, Simon Raymonde, Jon Turner, Martin McCarrick, Gini Ball	5:58
2.	"Come Here My Love"	Van Morrison	Jean, Simon Raymonde, Ivo Watts-Russell	3:42
3.	"At First, and Then"	Peter Ulrich	Peter Ulrich	1:58
4.	"Strength of Strings"	Gene Clark	Dominic Appleton, Jon Turner, Keith Mitchell, Nigel K. Hine, Deirdre and Louise Rutkowski, Anne Turner, Les McKeown, Martin McCarrick	4:41
5.	"Morning Glory"	Tim Buckley	Deirdre and Louise Rutkowski, Jon Turner, Martin McCarrick, Gini Ball	2:56

Side 3
No.	Title	Writer(s)	Interpreted by	Length
1.	"Inch-Blue"	Ivo Watts-Russell, John Fryer	Ivo Watts-Russell, John Fryer	1:08
2.	"I Want to Live"	Gary Ogan, Bill Lamb	Deirdre and Louise Rutkowski, Jon Turner	4:05
3.	"Mama K (1)"	Ivo Watts-Russell, John Fryer	Ivo Watts-Russell, John Fryer	0:53
4.	"Filigree & Shadow"	Ivo Watts-Russell, John Fryer	Ivo Watts-Russell, John Fryer	1:19
5.	"Firebrothers"	Gary Duncan	Richenel, Jon Turner, Chris Pye	3:53
6.	"Thaïs (1)"	Ivo Watts-Russell, John Fryer	Ivo Watts-Russell, John Fryer	1:08
7.	"I Must Have Been Blind"	Tim Buckley	Richenel, Jon Turner	3:30
8.	"A Heart of Glass"	Ivo Watts-Russell, John Fryer	Ivo Watts-Russell, John Fryer	3:45

Side 4
No.	Title	Writer(s)	Interpreted by	Length
1.	"Alone"	Colin Newman, Graham Lewis	Caroline Seaman, Alison Limerick, Simon Raymonde, Martin McCarrick, Gini Ball	4:13
2.	"Mama K (2)"	Ivo Watts-Russell, John Fryer	Ivo Watts-Russell, John Fryer, Martin McCarrick	0:34
3.	"The Horizon Bleeds and Sucks Its Thumb"	Ivo Watts-Russell, John Fryer	Alan Curtis, Mark Cox, Ivo Watts-Russell, John Fryer	2:53
4.	"Drugs"	David Byrne, Brian Eno	Alison Limerick, Andrew Gray, Steven Young, Ivo Watts-Russell	3:09
5.	"Red Rain"	Simon Raymonde, Ivo Watts-Russell, John Fryer	Caroline Seaman, Simon Raymonde, Tony Waerea	3:52
6.	"Thaïs (2)"	Ivo Watts-Russell, John Fryer	Ivo Watts-Russell, John Fryer	3:13

=== CD (DAD 609 CD) ===
No.	Title	Writer(s)	Length
1.	"Velvet Belly"	M. McCarrick	1:19
2.	"The Jeweller"	T. Rapp	3:15
3.	"Ivy and Neet"	S. Raymonde	4:48
4.	"Meniscus"	D. Curtis	2:28
5.	"Tears"	S. Raymonde	0:21
6.	"Tarantula"	M. Young	4:58
7.	"My Father"	J. Collins	5:58
8.	"Come Here My Love"	V. Morrison	3:42
9.	"At First, and Then"	P. Ulrich	1:58
10.	"Strength of Strings"	G. Clark	4:41
11.	"Morning Glory"	T. Buckley	2:56
12.	"Inch-Blue"	I. Watts-Russell, J. Fryer	1:08
13.	"I Want to Live"	G. Ogan, B. Lamb	4:05
14.	"Mama K (1)"	I. Watts-Russell, J. Fryer	0:53
15.	"Filigree & Shadow"	I. Watts-Russell, J. Fryer	1:19
16.	"Firebrothers"	G. Duncan	3:53
17.	"Thaïs (1)"	I. Watts-Russell, J. Fryer	1:08
18.	"I Must Have Been Blind"	T. Buckley	3:30
19.	"A Heart of Glass"	I. Watts-Russell, J. Fryer	3:45
20.	"Alone"	C. Newman, G. Lewis	4:13
21.	"Mama K (2)"	I. Watts-Russell, J. Fryer	0:34
22.	"The Horizon Bleeds and Sucks Its Thumb"	I. Watts-Russell, J. Fryer	2:53
23.	"Drugs"	D. Byrne, B. Eno	3:09
24.	"Red Rain"	S. Raymonde, I. Watts-Russell, J. Fryer	3:52
25.	"Thaïs (2)"	I. Watts-Russell, J. Fryer	3:13

== Personnel ==
Musicians

- Dominic Appleton (Breathless) – vocals
- Deirdre Rutkowski – vocals
- Louise Rutkowski – vocals
- Simon Raymonde (Cocteau Twins) – guitar, bass, keyboards
- Richard Thomas (Dif Juz) – saxophone
- David Curtis (Dif Juz) – guitar
- Jon Turner – keyboards
- Alison Limerick – vocals
- Jean (recorded as Jeanette on Survival Records) – vocals
- Peter Ulrich (Dead Can Dance) – percussion
- Keith Mitchell – guitar
- Nigel K. Hine – guitar
- Anne Turner – background vocals
- Les McKeown – background vocals
- Martin McCarrick – background vocals
- Hubertus "Richenel" Baars – vocals
- Chris Pye – guitar
- Caroline Seaman (Heavenly Bodies, ex-members of Dead Can Dance) – vocals
- Alan Curtis (Dif Juz) – guitar
- Mark Cox (The Wolfgang Press) – keyboards
- Andrew Gray (The Wolfgang Press) – guitar
- Steven Young (Colourbox) – drum programming
- Tony Waera – didgeridoo
- Gini Ball – violin, viola
- John Fryer – programming
- Ivo Watts-Russell – music, keyboards

Visual

- Concept and art direction by Ivo Watts-Russell and Nigel Grierson
- Photography by Nigel Grierson
- Design by Vaughan Oliver at v23
- Design assistance by Erwin Esen
- Cover model: Pallas Citroën
