= Caroline Crawley =

English singer (1963–2016)

- Born: 8 August 1963; Bournemouth, England
- Died: 4 October 2016 (aged 53)
- Occupation: Singer
- Formerly of: Shelleyan Orphan, This Mortal Coil, Babacar

Caroline Lesley Crawley (8 August 1963 – 4 October 2016) was an English singer who sang for various bands.

== Career ==
Caroline Crawley was the co-founder of Shelleyan Orphan alongside guitarist Jemaur Tayle. They met in their mutual home town of Bournemouth, England, where they had a shared appreciation of the poet Percy Bysshe Shelley.

The name of the band comes from the Shelley poem "Spirit of Solitude". Crawley was the lead vocalist in the band that went on to release four albums, Helleborine (1987), Century Flower (1989), Humroot (1992) and We Have Everything We Need (2008). In 1991, Crawley was approached by 4AD Records founder Ivo Watts-Russell who asked her to appear on four tracks of This Mortal Coil's album Blood. Crawley was permitted to do her own interpretations of the tracks, and appeared in the video for the Syd Barrett cover, "Late Night".

In the early 1990s, Crawley formed Babacar along with bassist Roberto Soave, guitarist Rob Steen, and drummer Boris Williams. They made their live debut playing four songs at the 4AD Records 13 Year Itch celebration on 22 July 1993 at the ICA, London. They released one album, Babacar in 1998, which also featured Porl Thompson, and were later joined by Jemaur Tayle.

== Death ==
Crawley died on 4 October 2016 after a long illness. She is survived by her daughter.

== Discography ==
=== Albums ===
as part of Shelleyan Orphan

- 1987–1988: Helleborine (UK and US Versions)
- 1989: Century Flower (UK, Brazil and US Versions)
- 1992: Humroot (UK, Brazil and US Versions)
- 2008: We Have Everything We Need

as part of This Mortal Coil

- 1991: Blood

as part of Babacar

- 1998: Babacar
