= Louise Rutkowski =

Scottish singer (born 1964)

- Born: 1964 (age 61–62)
- Origin: Glasgow, Scotland
- Occupation: Singer
- Formerly of: This Mortal Coil
- Website: Louise Rutkowski

Louise Rutkowski (born 1964) is a Scottish singer who rose to prominence as part of the 4AD music project This Mortal Coil.

== Early life ==
Louise Rutkowski, along with her sister Deirdre, began her singing career in 1982 as a backup singer for the band Jazzateers. After a lineup change and a move from Postcard Records to Rough Trade Records, the band was renamed to Bougie Bougie. At this time, Louise and Deirdre left the band to form a new band, Sunset Gun, with keyboard player Ross Campbell. The band signed with CBS Records, recording three singles and an album with producers Pete Wingfield and Alan Rankine.

In 1988, Louise provided backing vocals from Phil Thornalley's album Swamp.

Upon the breakup of Sunset Gun, Louise and Deidre, recording as The Florentines, released the Man of Mine EP on the English label él Records.

== Career ==
=== This Mortal Coil ===
As part of the 4AD label's music collective This Mortal Coil, Louise and Deirde can be heard on several songs on the Filigree & Shadow and Blood albums. Louise continued her collaboration with 4AD as the lead vocalist on The Hope Blister's 1998 album "...Smile's OK" album.

=== Solo and collaborative career ===
Rutkowski also performed in The Kindness of Strangers, with producer and composer Craig Armstrong and playwright Peter Arnott. The band, signed to US label Interscope Records, released the album Hope in 1993.

In 2001, Rutkowski, collaborating with The Roland Perrin Trio, recorded covers of six Randy Newman song for the mini-album 6 Songs. It was released on her own label, Jock Records, and distributed by 4AD via mail order.

After an extended hiatus from recording, Rutkowski began to release new recordings in the 2010s. The first of these, 'Mimi', was the product of a writing partnership with Glasgow musician Irvin Duguid, and an album, Diary of a Lost Girl, followed, released in February 2014 by Jock Records.

Rutkowski said of the album: "Most of all I envisaged this album as a soundtrack to life for the listener. I remember visiting London when I’d just met Irvin and was listening to the bare bones of "Float", one of the album tracks, and trying to come up with something. I was sitting on the Tube and somehow the music, combined with the motion of the train and watching people sitting thinking as they endured their journey, made me realise that I wanted this to be an album that would be a part of someone's daily life; rather than something they would put on at home. Much as the This Mortal Coil albums were for a lot of fans that have spoken to me over the years, the music should accompany whatever is going on for that person, and hopefully make it easier for them, or help them to come to conclusions. It's a very personal album and I would hope it would become personal for the listener too".

Rutkowski released another solo album, Home, on her own Jock Records label in 2018 and followed it up with an acoustic version of the album.

Rutkowski's most recent recordings are the 2021 solo single "Forbidden Fruit" and "The Feeling's Gone," a 2021 single by singer-songwriter Nick Brown.
