= Blood (This Mortal Coil album) =

Studio album by This Mortal Coil
- Released: 22 April 1991
- Studios: Blackwing (London); Palladium (Edinburgh)
- Genres: Ethereal wave; dream pop
- Length: 76:15
- Label: 4AD
- Producers: John Fryer and Ivo Watts-Russell

This Mortal Coil chronology
Filigree & Shadow (1986)	Blood (1991)	1983-1991 (1993)

Singles from Blood
- 1. "You and Your Sister" Released: 8 April 1991

Professional ratings
Review scores
Source	Rating
AllMusic	4.5/5 stars
Pitchfork	8.4/10
Select	4/5

Blood is the third and final album released by 4AD collective This Mortal Coil, an umbrella title for a loose grouping of guest musicians and vocalists brought together by label co-founder Ivo Watts-Russell. The supergroup consists primarily of artists attached to the 4AD label, of which Watts-Russell was boss and president at the time. The double album was released in April 1991, and was the second release on 4AD to utilize the double album-identifier "DAD" prefix in its catalog number.

Blood was the final LP in the project's history, although Watts-Russell collaborated again with two TMC performers on his next project, The Hope Blister, in 1998. A remastered and repackaged CD edition of Blood was issued with the complete This Mortal Coil recordings in a self-titled box set, released in late November 2011. The CD was released individually shortly thereafter.

In 2013, NME ranked the album at number 493 in its list of The 500 Greatest Albums of All Time.

== Background and recording ==
Watts-Russel; and John Fryer were the producers of the album as well as the composers for many of the songs.

== Track listing ==
Side 1
No.	Title	Writer(s)	Interpreted by	Length
1.	"The Lacemaker"	Ivo Watts-Russell, John Fryer, Martin McCarrick	Caroline Crawley, Deirdre Rutkowski	4:06
2.	"Mr Somewhere"	Peter Milton Walsh	Caroline Crawley, Jon Turner, Martin McCarrick	2:52
3.	"Andialu"	Ivo Watts-Russell, John Fryer	Alison Limerick	3:03
4.	"With Tomorrow"	Gene Clark, Jesse Ed Davis	Deirdre Rutkowski, Jon Turner	2:40
5.	"Loose Joints"	Ivo Watts-Russell, John Fryer, Martin McCarrick	This Mortal Coil	2:26
6.	"You and Your Sister"	Chris Bell	Kim Deal, Tanya Donelly	3:14

Side 2
No.	Title	Writer(s)	Interpreted by	Length
7.	"Nature's Way"	Randy California	Alison Limerick, Deirdre Rutkowski	3:19
8.	"I Come and Stand at Every Door"	Nâzım Hikmet, James Waters	Deirdre and Louise Rutkowski, Tim Freeman	3:54
9.	"Bitter"	Ivo Watts-Russell, John Fryer	Alison Limerick, Deirdre Rutkowski, Ikuko Kozu	6:25
10.	"Baby Ray Baby"	Ivo Watts-Russell, John Fryer	Deirdre Rutkowski, This Mortal Coil	2:13
11.	"Several Times"	Pieter Nooten	Pieter Nooten, Deirdre Rutkowski	3:12

Side 3
No.	Title	Writer(s)	Interpreted by	Length
12.	"The Lacemaker II"	Ivo Watts-Russell, John Fryer, Martin McCarrick	This Mortal Coil	1:24
13.	"Late Night"	Syd Barrett	Caroline Crawley	3:03
14.	"Ruddy and Wretched"	Ivo Watts-Russell, John Fryer	This Mortal Coil	3:15
15.	"Help Me Lift You Up"	Mary Margaret O'Hara	Caroline Crawley, Deirdre Rutkowski	5:06
16.	"Carolyn's Song"	David Roback	Deirdre Rutkowski	3:47
17.	"D.D. and E."	Ivo Watts-Russell, John Fryer	Deirdre Rutkowski, Ivo Watts-Russell	0:47

Side 4
No.	Title	Writer(s)	Interpreted by	Length
18.	"'Til I Gain Control Again"	Rodney Crowell	Deirdre and Louise Rutkowski, Heidi Berry	4:43
19.	"Dreams Are Like Water"	Ivo Watts-Russell, John Fryer	Deirdre Rutkowski, This Mortal Coil	8:37
20.	"I Am the Cosmos"	Chris Bell	Deirdre Rutkowski, Dominic Appleton	4:05
21.	"(Nothing But) Blood"	Ivo Watts-Russell, John Fryer	Deirdre Rutkowski, This Mortal Coil	4:04

== Credits ==
Personnel as printed in the liner notes:

=== Music ===
1. "The Lacemaker"
  - Voices: Caroline Crawley, Deirdre Rutkowski
  - Music: Ivo Watts-Russell
  - Strings: Martin McCarrick, Jocelyn Pook, Sally Herbert, Sonia Slany
  - Programming: John Fryer
2. "Mr Somewhere"
  - Voice: Caroline Crawley
  - Music: Jon Turner
  - Cello: Martin McCarrick
3. "Andialu"
  - Voice: Alison Limerick
  - Music: Ivo Watts-Russell, John Fryer
4. "With Tomorrow"
  - Voice: Deirdre Rutkowski
  - Music: Jon Turner
5. "Loose Joints"
  - Music: Ivo Watts-Russell
  - Strings: Martin McCarrick, Jocelyn Pook, Sally Herbert, Sonia Slany
  - Programming: John Fryer
6. "You and Your Sister"
  - Voices: Kim Deal, Tanya Donelly
  - Music: Jon Turner
  - Strings: Martin McCarrick, Jocelyn Pook, Sally Herbert, Sonia Slany
7. "Nature's Way"
  - Voices: Alison Limerick, Deirdre Rutkowski
  - Strings: Martin McCarrick, Jocelyn Pook, Sally Herbert, Sonia Slany
8. "I Come and Stand at Every Door"
  - Voices: Louise Rutkowski, Deirdre Rutkowski, Tim Freeman
  - Violin: Gini Ball
  - Music: Ivo Watts-Russell
  - Programming: John Fryer
9. "Bitter"
  - Voices: Ikuko Kozu, Alison Limerick, Deirdre Rutkowski
  - Music: Ivo Watts-Russell
  - Guitar: Jim Williams
  - Strings: Martin McCarrick, Jocelyn Pook, Sally Herbert, Sonia Slany
  - Programming: John Fryer
10. "Baby Ray Baby"
  - Voice: Deirdre Rutkowski
  - Music: Ivo Watts-Russell
  - Programming: John Fryer
11. "Several Times"
  - Voice: Deirdre Rutkowski
  - Violin: Gini Ball
  - Music: Pieter Nooten
  - Programming: John Fryer
12. "The Lacemaker II"
  - Music: Ivo Watts-Russell
  - Strings: Martin McCarrick, Jocelyn Pook, Sally Herbert, Sonia Slany
  - Programming: John Fryer
13. "Late Night"
  - Voice: Caroline Crawley
  - Music: Jon Turner, Ivo Watts-Russell
14. "Ruddy and Wretched"
  - Music: Ivo Watts-Russell
  - Programming: John Fryer
  - Guitar: Jim Williams
  - Voice: Anne Garrigues
15. "Help Me Lift You Up"
  - Voices: Caroline Crawley, Deirdre Rutkowski
  - Music and programming: Jon Turner
16. "Carolyn's Song"
  - Voice: Deirdre Rutkowski
  - Strings: Martin McCarrick, Jocelyn Pook, Sally Herbert, Sonia Slany
  - Piano: Jon Turner
  - Guitar: Jim Williams
  - Drums: Rain Parade
17. "D.D. and E."
  - Voice: Deirdre Rutkowski
  - Music: Ivo Watts-Russell
18. "'Til I Gain Control Again"
  - Voices: Heidi Berry, Louise Rutkowski, Deirdre Rutkowski
  - Piano: Jon Turner
  - Strings: Martin McCarrick, Jocelyn Pook, Sally Herbert, Sonia Slany
19. "Dreams Are Like Water"
  - Voice: Deirdre Rutkowski
  - Music: Ivo Watts-Russell
  - Programming: John Fryer
20. "I Am the Cosmos"
  - Voices: Dominic Appleton, Deirdre Rutkowski
  - Music and programming: Jon Turner
  - Guitar: Jim Williams
21. "(Nothing But) Blood"
  - Voice: Deirdre Rutkowski
  - Music: Ivo Watts-Russell
  - Programming: John Fryer

=== Production ===
- Produced by Ivo Watts-Russell
- Co-produced and engineered by John Fryer
- Additional engineering by Jon Turner
- Recorded at Blackwing Studios, London and Palladium Studios, Edinburgh
- Mixed at Blackwing Studios, London
- Mastering by Gus Shaw
- String arrangements by Martin McCarrick
- Sleeve design by Vaughan Oliver/v23
- Black and white photography by Nigel Grierson; colour photography by Claire Lazarus
