= Sixteen Days / Gathering Dust =

EP by This Mortal Coil
- Released: September 1983
- Genre: Post-punk; gothic rock
- Length: 16:46
- Label: 4AD
- Producer: John Fryer, Ivo Watts-Russell

This Mortal Coil chronology
Sixteen Days / Gathering Dust (1983)	It'll End in Tears (1984)

Sixteen Days / Gathering Dust is the debut single released in 1983 by This Mortal Coil, a loose collective of musicians and vocalists assembled by Ivo Watts-Russell for his record label 4AD.

== Background ==
Watts-Russell had signed Modern English in 1980. A few years later, he asked them to record a medley of two of their early songs, "Sixteen Days" and "Gathering Dust". The band had been performing these particular songs together at the conclusion of their live sets. When the band declined, Watts-Russell decided to assemble a group of musicians to record the medley instead. He chose members of Cocteau Twins, Colourbox, and Modern English itself, along with vocalist Gordon Sharp of Cindytalk.

== Release ==
Elizabeth Fraser and Robin Guthrie of the Cocteau Twins recorded the B-side, a cover of Tim Buckley's "Song to the Siren". Watts-Russell was so pleased with the track that he made "Siren" the A-side of the 7-inch release. At the same time, he was unhappy with the "Sixteen Days / Gathering Dust" medley and did not reissue it until 2006, when it was included on a 4AD compilation EP was only available on iTunes.

4AD reissued it again in 2011 (this time remastered), as part of This Mortal Coil's eponymous box set. The track appears on the set's fourth and final disc, Dust & Guitars, a compilation of all the band's singles. After the box set sold out, 4AD reissued Dust & Guitars as a standalone "rarities" album in 2012.

== Track listing ==
=== 12" EP version ===
Side One

1. "Sixteen Days / Gathering Dust" (9:07)

Side Two

1. "Song to the Siren" (3:30)
2. "Sixteen Days Reprise" (4:10)

=== 7" single version ===
Side One

1. "Song to the Siren" (3:30)

Side Two

1. "Sixteen Days Reprise" (4:10)

== Sources ==
- Aston, Martin (2013). Facing the Other Way: The Story of 4AD. London: The Friday Project. ISBN 978-0-00-748961-9.
- Aston, Martin (17 November 2011). "Song to the Siren's irresistible tang". The Guardian.
- Raymonde, Simon (2024). In One Ear: Cocteau Twins, Ivor Raymonde and Me. London: Nine Eight Books. ISBN 978-1-78870-938-5.
