= Heidi Berry =

American musician

- Born: December 8, 1958 (age 67); Boston, Massachusetts, United States
- Genres: Folk; indie; alternative; dream pop
- Occupation: Musician
- Instruments: Vocals; piano; guitar
- Years active: 1987–present
- Labels: Creation; 4AD; 3-Loop

Heidi Berry (born December 8, 1958) is a British-American singer-songwriter. In the late 1980s and early 1990s, she recorded and released four critically acclaimed solo albums on the British independent record labels Creation and 4AD, for which she is best known.

== Career ==
Her earliest release on Creation Records was the 1987 Folk-Rock styled mini-album, Firefly. A second Creation release, Below The Waves followed in 1989, which saw a more eclectic musical style emerging for Berry. Her association with 4AD began with a guest vocal on Blood (This Mortal Coil album) in 1991, where she contributed to their reworking of a Rodney Crowell classic, "'Til I Gain Control Again". Berry eventually moved over to 4AD as a signed artist, releasing three solo albums, Love (1991), Heidi Berry (1993), and Miracle (1995). The album Heidi Berry achieved a minor hit with the lovely "The Moon and the Sun", and the subsequent album yielded tours in the UK, Europe and the USA. Each of her solo albums achieved critical acclaim, and Berry's music garnered a devoted cult audience. Pomegranate: An Anthology was her final 4AD release in 2001. This featured the song, "Needle's Eye", a song written by Berry, and produced by Patrick Fitzgerald (Kitchens of Distinction, Stephen Hero) as part of their collaborative project, Lost Girls.

== Biography ==
Berry was born in Boston, Massachusetts, in 1958, the third of four children. Her mother, Beth was a jazz singer with Québécois roots, and her father, Don Berry, worked in theatre and film, most notably appearing alongside Ed Harris in the George A Romero 1981 cult movie, Knightriders. The Berry family moved between New York City, New Hampshire and Massachusetts, and after her parents' divorce, her mother met and married British anti-architect and Right Livelihood Award laureate, John F. C. Turner, and the family took up residency in London in 1973.

While studying for a Fine Art Degree in London, she recorded a demo tape in 1985, which eventually found its way to Creation Records boss Alan McGee via her then boyfriend Pete Astor. She signed to Creation in 1987, releasing Firefly, a six-song mini-album, recorded with Martin Duffy of Felt on keyboards and members of Astor's band The Weather Prophets. An album, Below the Waves, followed in 1989, featuring her brother Christopher on acoustic guitar (who also played on her later albums). Her relationship with Creation broke down, and she left, stating "I simply felt that they didn't understand me".

It was during her support set for Felt in London's Camden Town in 1991, that Berry's performance caught the eye of Ivo Watts-Russell. He recalled being drawn in by her "Dusty Springfield hand movements". This led to him asking Berry to perform the song "'Til I Gain Control Again" on the third album by This Mortal Coil (Blood). Heidi Berry went on to record three solo albums for 4AD, Love, Heidi Berry and Miracle. Love featured an array of musicians, including Martin McCarrick (of Siouxsie & the Banshees), Terry Bickers and Laurence O'Keefe (of Levitation), Ian Kearey (Oysterband) and Lol Coxhill. The self-titled Heidi Berry album focused on "being unlucky in love and in life."

Berry toured extensively during 1991–1993 in the UK, Europe and the US. Highlights included tours with Red House Painters, Mazzy Star, Indigo Girls, Everything But The Girl. She also toured with Brendan Perry (of Dead Can Dance) – and recorded several songs including ‘The Devil’, which he produced at his studio in Ireland. This was released on the 4AD label promo CD, "Shaving The Pavement"

In 1999, she formed Lost Girls, a collaboration with Patrick Fitzgerald of Kitchens of Distinction, releasing the single "Needle's Eye". Lost Girls' long-awaited album was released in October 2014 by 3 Loop Music on vinyl, download and as a 2CD expanded edition (featuring demos and extra tracks). Berry has also contributed harmony vocals to a number of alternative, indie and dream pop artists, notably Pete Astor, Breathless, Spear of Destiny, and Stephen Hero. In the early 2000s, she collaborated with soundtrack composer, Andy Cowton. on two BBC TV documentary soundtracks.

Martin Aston's definitive story of the 4AD label, Facing The Wrong Way includes numerous entries about Heidi Berry. There is also a short entry in The Creation Records Story: My Magpie Eyes are Hungry for the Prize. A filmed interview with Heidi Berry features in the documentary feature film, 'Upside Down: The Creation Records Story'

== Musical style ==
If Berry's music has proved difficult to classify, Ivo Watts-Russell considered this a strength. He said of her work in 2013, "Music often has to do with the time when [it was] made, but Heidi's three albums transcend that for me. Her albums are at the core of what I hoped I was doing with 4AD, to represent people who could express themselves in music that has nothing to do with the flow and flavour of the decade in which they were made. It's the same reasons why Nick Drake's music works for people. Heidi's music is not about where she fitted in. Instead, it has great lasting value." .

Berry's early music garnered comparisons to early Marianne Faithfull, Nick Drake, Sandy Denny, Sarah McLachlan and Beth Orton, and was described as "highly orchestrated folk-rock" The Boston Globe described her as sounding "like a majestic cross between Sandy Denny, Enya and Sade". Charlotte Robinson of PopMatters described her styles as essentially "folk", with "dark...instrumental flourishes and layered vocals". Barry Didcock of the Sunday Herald argues that Berry might be "the great overlooked voice of acoustic rock."

While the album,Miracle has an acoustic band basis for much of the music, Berry never returned to the straightforward folk/rock of Firefly, instead letting the ghostly arrangements of 'Below the Waves' be her guide for future work.

NME said of the song, "Needle’s Eye" on its initial 4AD release, "Over a wasted, civil war-style landscape comes a vocal that sounds like some daughter of Tim Buckley intoning a lament for the dead. I know nothing about Lost Girls; all I know is the world should know more about them."

Martin Aston of Mojo commented on the sleevenotes for Pomegranate, "Given how many singer-songwriters have ploughed the folk-fusion field since Heidi, her influence is doubtless greater than people realise."

== Music educator ==
Heidi Berry is currently a Senior Lecturer at the British and Irish Modern Music Institute, where she teaches on the Masters programme. She holds a Master's degree in Songwriting from Bath Spa University. Berry joined BIMM Brighton as a lecturer in the second year of its existence and has contributed extensively to curriculum development across the college, specialising in Songwriting and Creativity.

== Visual artist ==
Before embarking on her musical career, Berry attended Chelsea School of Art and London's Goldsmiths College and gained a BA (hons) in Fine Art from Middlesex University (formerly Hornsey School of Art). She continues to create visual art, concentrating on painting and printmaking.

== Discography ==
=== Solo albums ===
- Firefly (1987) Producer: Pete Astor. [LP/CD] Creation (CAD1012CD)
- Below the Waves (1989) Producer: Heidi Berry/Christian Lunch [LP/CD] Creation(CRELP048)
- Love (1991) Producer: Pete Walsh. [LP/CD] 4AD (CAD1012CD)
- Heidi Berry (1993) Producer: Hugh Jones. [LP/CD] 4AD (CAD 3009 CD;US /CD: 45301
- Miracle (1996) Producer: Hugh Jones. [LP/CD] 4AD (CAD 1011 CD;US CD: 46020)

=== Singles, EPs, compilations ===
- Distant Thunder (1992), Warner Bros. USA (CD PRO- CD)
- "Lilliput" (1992), 4AD US (2 CD+hardcover book) (LILLIPUT 1/2)
- "The 13 Year Itch" (1993), 4AD UK (CD Limited Ed.)
- "The Moon and the Sun" (1993), 4AD (CD single BAD-3010)
- Soil Samples 13 (1993), Warner Bros. USA (PRO-CD-6107)
- All Virgos Are Mad (1994), Warner Bros. USA (CD 9362 45789-2)
- Facing the Wrong Way (1995), 4AD UK (CD FTWW 1)
- Think I’m Getting the Hang of It (1995) 4AD US (CD PRO-CD-7625)
- No Balls (1995) 4AD US (CD PRO-CD-7300)
- Shaving the Pavement (1996) (C PRO-C-8096)
- Dr. Martens: Shoe Pie (1996) 4AD US/UK (CD SHOE-1-CD)
- Pomegranate: an Anthology (2001) Producer: Various. 4AD [LP/CD] (EAD2K10A)

=== Collaborations ===
- Lost Girls (2014) Producer: Patrick Fitzgerald. [LP/CD]3-Loop Records
- Aeroplane (1996) Producer: Aeroplane (John Ross / Rob Fitzpatrick). [EP] Detox

=== Guest vocals ===
- "Deciduous Eccentric" (2019) Song, 'Stripping Oliver’. Stephen Hero (Ragoora Records CD)
- Lost Girls (2014) Collaborative album with Patrick Fitzgerald. (Bad Parents CD)
- "Thirty-one" (2014) Song, 'Hurry Home'. Speak of Destiny (Easter Snow Music CD)
- "Green to Blue" (2012) Song,'Just For Today'. Breathless (Tenor Vossa CD)
- "Aeroplane" (1996) Producer: Aeroplane (John Ross / Rob Fitzpatrick). [EP] Detox
- "Blood" (1991) Song,'Til I Gain Control Again'. This Mortal Coil. 4AD CD

=== Film and television ===
- Hyper Normalisation (2016) BBC trailer. Dir. Adam Curtis. (TV)
- Generations; Naked (2000) BBC- Soundtrack collab. With Andy Cowton (TV)
- Dawson's Creek (2002) S05-E08. Song: ‘The Moon And The Sun’ Dir. Lev L Spiro. (TV)
- Baywatch (1998) Song: ‘Miracle’. Pearson Television / The Baywatch Company (TV)
- Up in the Air (1991) Promo. Dir. Miles Aldridge. (VID/DVD)
- The Moon and the Sun (1993) Promo. Dir. Angela Conway. (VID/DVD)
- Northshore Train (1980) Promo. Dir. Mehdi Norowzian. (VID)
