= ...Smile's OK =

Studio album by the Hope Blister
- Released: May 25, 1998
- Genre: Ambient; dream pop; ethereal wave
- Length: 42:06
- Label: 4AD
- Producer: Ivo Watts-Russell

The Hope Blister chronology
...Smile's OK (1998)	Underarms (1999)

Professional ratings
Review scores
Source	Rating
AllMusic	4/5 stars
Los Angeles Times	3/4 stars

...Smile's OK is the debut album by the Hope Blister, released in 1998.

== Track listing ==
1. "Dagger" (Neil Halstead)
2. "Only Human" (Heidi Berry)
3. "Outer Skin" (Chris Knox)
4. "Sweet Unknown" (A. Shaw)
5. "Let the Happiness In" (David Sylvian)
6. "Is Jesus Your Pal" (Slowblow)
7. "Spider and I" (Brian Eno)
8. "Hanky Panky Nohow" (John Cale)

== Personnel ==
- Louise Rutkowski – vocals
- Laurence O'Keefe – bass guitar
- Audrey Riley – cello
- Chris Tombling – violin
- Leo Payne – violin
- Sue Dench – viola
- Richard Thomas – saxophone, drums
- Audrey Riley – string arrangements
- Louise Laurence, Dmitri Willilams and Astrid Williamson – backing vocals
- Sheena Bizarre – chatter and layered vocal
- Ivo Watts-Russell – producer
- John Fryer – mixing
