= Another Day (Roy Harper song) =

Song by Roy Harper

from the album Flat Baroque and Berserk
- Released: 1970
- Recorded: September 1969
- Studio: Abbey Road, London
- Genre: Folk
- Length: 2:57
- Label: Harvest SHVL 766; Chrysalis CHR 1160; Science Friction HUCD003
- Songwriter: Roy Harper
- Producer: Peter Jenner

Official audio
- "Another Day" (Remastered) on YouTube

"Another Day" is a 1970 song by the English folk rock singer and songwriter Roy Harper for his album Flat Baroque and Berserk. It was recorded at Abbey Road in London, and produced by Pink Floyd's manager and sometimes producer Peter Jenner. "Another Day" is widely considered one of the high points of Harper's career.

The song has been covered by Peter Gabriel and Kate Bush in 1979, and by Elizabeth Fraser and Robin Guthrie of the Cocteau Twins for the collective This Mortal Coil's 1984 album It'll End in Tears. A live version of the song appears on Harper's 1974 double album Flashes from the Archives of Oblivion.

== Lyrics ==
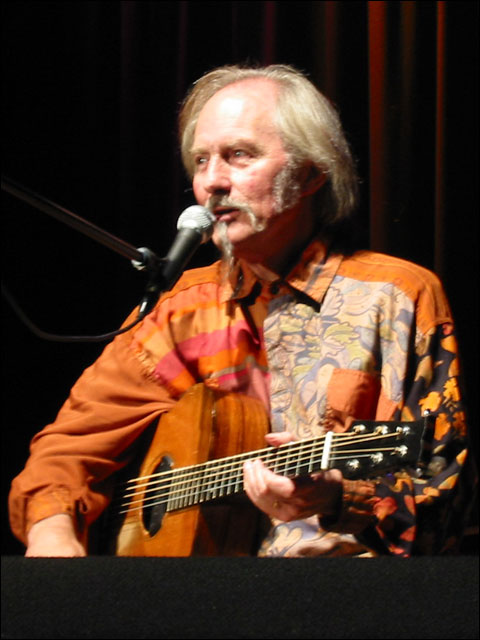
Roy Harper in 2001

The lyrics seem to be from the point of view of a man who has a momentary reencounter with a former lover. The song details his feelings of regret and lost opportunities. Midway through the track, Harper's lyrics seem to switch from the point of view of the man to that of the woman, beginning with the line "I loved you a long time ago". The closing lyrics revert to the man's point of view and are tinged with finality, and include lines such as "then across the room, inside a tomb, a chance is waxed and waned".

Harper said that the song was about "a split second" while introducing the song during a 1972 concert. The bitter sweet lyrics are written from the point of view of a man looking back with regret upon a missed chance at romance. He views his former girlfriend, who he has met again, with both wonder and reticence and is left with feelings of regret and powerlessness. She wishes that they could both step back in time and seems to wants him to make a move, but he can't. He wants to reconnect but hesitates: "And at the door we can't say more than just another day, and without a sound I turn around and walk away."

== Covers ==
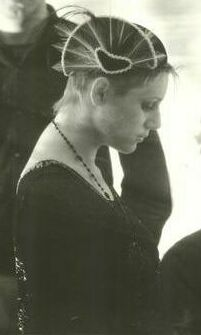
Elizabeth Fraser in 1986

In the 1979 cover by Peter Gabriel and Kate Bush, the male and female vocals are inverted so that Bush sings the lyrics from the protagonist's point of view, and Gabriel sings those of the lost lover. The track is accompanied by keyboards and Harper's guitar riff is played on a piano. The cover led to Bush collaborating with Harper in 1980 when he sang backing vocals on her song "Breathing". They later dueted on the track "You" from his The Unknown Soldier album.

The 4AD records collective This Mortal Coil recorded a version on their 1984 album It'll End in Tears, sung by Elizabeth Fraser of the Cocteau Twins and accompanied by strings rather than acoustic guitar. The album was conceived by the 4AD founder Ivo Watts-Russell, who sought to renew interest in at the time neglected 1970s songwriters such as Harper and Alex Chilton of Big Star.

In 2013, the This Mortal Coil version was reinterpreted by the contemporary classical cellist, guitarist and electronic musician Oliver Coates. Like the TMC track, Coates' version is accompanied by strings only. It is sung by the pseudonymous Chrysanthemum Bear. According to Coates: "We have recorded many things informally because I'm devoted to the colour of her voice and the way she uses it. Part of the recording [of "Another Day"] happened in an abandoned structure with a large reverb off the coast of Norway. Part [of it] was recorded in the far north of Scotland."
