= Sunset Gun (band) =

Scottish band

- Origin: Glasgow
- Genres: Soul; Pop
- Years active: 1983–1985
- Members: Louise Rutkowski; Deidre Rutkowski; Ross Campbell

Sunset Gun was a band from Glasgow, Scotland who formed in 1983. It is a band composed of sisters Louise and Deirdre Rutkowski and Ross Campbell.

== Biography ==
The band was active in Glasgow's music scene in the early 1980s and had a soul and pop sound.

Louise and her sister Deirdre Rutkowski formed the 1980s soul pop band Sunset Gun alongside Ross Campbell, signed to CBS Records and worked with soul record producer Pete Wingfield to prepare for the release of their debut album In An Ideal World in 1985. As the album failed to sell in considerable numbers, CBS Records dropped the band and the members disbanded to engage with new projects.

== Band members ==
- Louise Rutkowski
- Deirdre Rutkowski
- Ross Campbell

== Discography ==
- In an Ideal World (1985)

== Subsequent music careers ==
Louise and Deirdre (Dee) Rutkowski went on to collaborate and feature on songs with This Mortal Coil.

== Legacy ==
Sunset Gun were featured in the 2024 documentary film, Since Yesterday, which interviewed pioneering Scottish girl bands and asked why they are not better remembered in popular culture or able to sustain their initial successes.

“Watching the documentary, you were left at the end going, ‘But… why?’ Why didn’t these bands receive more recognition? I mean, that’s good music.” Louise Rutkowski

The film was shown to a sold out audience on Closing Night film at the 2024 Edinburgh International Film Festival.
