= Underarms and Sideways =

2005 album by the Hope Blister

Compilation album by the Hope Blister
- Released: 12 December 2005
- Genre: Alternative; dark ambient
- Length: 40:46 (disc 1); 45:34 (disc 2); 86:20 (total)
- Label: 4AD
- Producer: Ivo Watts-Russell (disc 1); Markus Guentner (disc 2)

The Hope Blister chronology
| Underarms (1999) | Underarms and Sideways (2005) |

Underarms and Sideways is a 2005 compilation album by the Hope Blister. It contains their 1999 album Underarms, a collection of mostly instrumental outtakes from the sessions for their first album, ...Smile's OK, as well as a disc of remixes of those outtakes, Sideways, created by musician Markus Guentner.

== Track listing ==
=== Disc 1 (Underarms) ===
1. "Sweet Medicine" (7:47)
2. "Friday Afternoon" (6:40)
3. "Iota" (2:29)
4. "Dagger Strings" (2:01)
5. "White On White" (4:03)
6. "Sweet Medicine 2" (13:40)
7. "Happiness Strings" (4:09)

=== Disc 2 (Sideways) ===
1. "Sideways One" (5:21)
2. "Sideways Two" (6:56)
3. "Sideways Three" (5:52)
4. "Sideways Four" (7:28)
5. "Sideways Five" (5:36)
6. "Sideways Six" (6:32)
7. "Sideways Seven" (7:53)
