= Dif Juz =

British band

- Origin: London, England
- Genres: Post-punk, dream pop, post-rock, instrumental rock
- Years active: 1980–1986
- Label: 4AD
- Spinoff of: London Pride
- Past members: Dave Curtis; Richard Thomas; Gary Bromley; Alan Curtis

Dif Juz were an English instrumental post-punk band, formed in London in 1980 and remaining active until 1986. The band comprised Dave Curtis (guitar), Alan Curtis (guitar), Gary Bromley (bass guitar) and Richard Thomas (percussion and saxophone).

== Background ==
Dif Juz band developed out of the punk band London Pride that was formed by the Curtis brothers. In late 1979, Alan Curtis was involved with new wave band Duran Duran. He apparently disappeared and missed a particularly volatile gig after the band hired the owners of the Birmingham Rum Runner nightclub as managers. In a 2003 interview, John Taylor (bass guitarist for Duran Duran) said "straight away Alan Curtis skipped town, thinking getting involved with two nightclub owners meant he would end up in pieces down a city alleyway."

Following Alan Curtis' return to London, he resumed his collaboration with his brother Dave and Richard Thomas (all of whom played in London Pride), and was joined by Gary Bromley. They determined to create something new and different. Dave Curtis was a trained classical guitarist, Alan Curtis's guitar play was self-taught and innovative, Thomas had a thirst for mastering wind instruments and production values, and Bromley's bass playing, whilst honed in West London, could have found home in Kingston, Jamaica. The resulting soundscape was dense, atmospheric, and spacious, driven by pounding bass lines and rhythm.

The name Dif Juz, according to Thomas, was a spur-of-the-moment utterance that "didn't mean anything".

The band signed with the 4AD label, and a demo was played by John Peel. The band performed a number of gigs in the London area in 1981, most notably at the Moonlight Club in West Hampstead and at Ealing Town Hall. The band's debut album with the label, Extractions, was released in 1985. It reached No. 11 on the UK Indie Chart.

The band befriended fellow labelmates Cocteau Twins and frequently collaborated with them. Cocteau Twins guitarist Robin Guthrie produced several of their recordings and vocalist Elizabeth Fraser sang on "Love Insane" from the album Extractions; in turn, Thomas played saxophone and tabla on Cocteau Twins' 1986 album Victorialand. Occasionally, the two bands toured together and played together at the Sadlers Wells Theatre.

Although the band was mainly instrumental, they occasionally worked with a vocalist from North London, Hollis Chambers.

At one point they served as a backing band for reggae/dub luminary Lee Scratch Perry for a few live dates. A studio album of this collaboration was recorded with Robin Guthrie as producer, but the album was never released and sits unheard in the 4AD vaults.

=== Present ===
The band never officially disbanded. However, due to health issues, neither Dave Curtis nor Bromley were able to devote the time needed to the band, and this led to a "slow dissolve". For a time, the band continued with bass player Scott Rodger who performed and recorded with the band on "Out of The Trees" and subsequent touring, but the spark seemed to be diminishing. The final step to dissolution occurred when Thomas became a touring drummer for The Jesus and Mary Chain.

Thomas has also worked with Butterfly Child, Moose, Felt, Cocteau Twins, The Wolfgang Press and April March. In 2017 Thomas joined with Simon Raymonde (former Cocteau Twins) under the name of Lost Horizons, releasing music via the Bella Union label. Bromley lives in Louisville, Kentucky where he hosts his weekly radio show, Outernational with Sir Basil Bromley, on ARTxFM and continues to release solo material. He has been a major influence on many of the bands that are based in Louisville and often performs with an outfit called The Children. Bromley is seen as a major contributor to the dub and reggae scene in Louisville. Dave Curtis spent some time collaborating with the Wolfgang Press, This Mortal Coil and Tranquil Trucking Company.

== Discography ==
Studio albums

- Time Clock Turn Back (1983)
- Who Says So? (1983)
- Extractions (1985)

EPs

- Huremics (1981)
- Vibrating Air (1981)

Compilation albums

- Out of the Trees (1986)
- Soundpool (1999)
