= It'll End in Tears =

1984 debut album by This Mortal Coil

Studio album by This Mortal Coil
- Released: 1 October 1984
- Studio: Blackwing (London)
- Genres: Dream pop; gothic rock
- Length: 44:12
- Label: 4AD
- Producers: John Fryer; Ivo Watts-Russell

This Mortal Coil chronology
Sixteen Days / Gathering Dust [EP] (1983)	It'll End in Tears (1984)	Filigree & Shadow (1986)

Singles from It'll End in Tears
- 1. "Song to the Siren" Released: September 1983; 2. "Kangaroo" Released: August 1984

It'll End in Tears is the debut album by the 4AD multi-artist studio (Note: This Mortal Coil never played live, although individual artists, notably the Cocteau Twins and Brendan Perry, did incorporate songs into their own live performances.) project This Mortal Coil, a loose grouping of artists brought together by label boss Ivo Watts-Russell. Released on 1 October 1984, it features many of the artists on the label's roster, including Elizabeth Fraser and Simon Raymonde of the Cocteau Twins, Cindy Sharp of Cindytalk, (Note: The transgender artist Sharp is credited as Gordon in the album notes but is later known as Cindy Sharp or Cinder.) Martyn Young of Colourbox and Lisa Gerrard of Dead Can Dance. While side one is mostly covers selected by Watts-Russell, side two contains original tracks composed by Raymonde and Gerrard.

The album's cover versions include two songs from Big Star's 1978 album Third/Sister Lovers, including "Kangaroo" (sung by Sharp and released as a single in the months leading up to the album's release) and "Holocaust". Fraser provides vocals for the covers of Tim Buckley's "Song to the Siren" and Roy Harper's "Another Day". The former was released as TMC's debut single and became an unexpected hit on the UK independent charts. Sharp sings on two further tracks: Rema-Rema's "Fond Affections" and the TMC original "A Single Wish", which closes the album.

This Mortal Coil recorded two further albums: Filigree & Shadow (1986) and Blood (1991). Both were highly praised and sold well, although neither achieved the same critical acclaim or cult status as It'll End in Tears.

== Conception ==
This Mortal Coil originates from a 1983 one-off single when the 4AD record label founder, Ivo Watts-Russell, asked the band Modern English to re-record their earlier songs "Sixteen Days" and "Gathering Dust" for re-release. He hired the long-term 4AD collaborator John Fryer to help with the engineering and production. The resulting melody "Sixteen Days / Gathering Dust" was sung by Elizabeth Fraser of the Cocteau Twins. Watts-Russell asked Fraser to record a version of Tim Buckley's "Song to the Siren" as the B-side. She was unaware of the track until Watts-Russell sent her a cassette copy days before the recording. She intended to sing the version a cappella but Watts-Russel was unhappy with the first cut and unsure how to handle the gaps between the verses and choruses. The Cocteau Twins guitarist Robin Guthrie happened to be in the studio at the time and was asked to provide guitar, which he did, somewhat reluctantly, in one take. The recording was completed in around three hours.

The cover was a critical success on the single's release to the extent that it was shortly reissued with "Song to the Siren" as the A-side. The reissue spent two years on the UK independent chart and by 2011 had sold over half a million copies. (Note: Fraser said in 2011 that "apart from the Tim Buckley song, the whole idea doesn't really work. We were asked to contribute to it but we never thought about it seriously. We were never in the studio together or anything. Even the Buckley song, I'm not really pleased with my vocals. I really like the song itself [...] I thought the words were beautiful.")

Watts-Russell conceived a follow-up album as a collection of cover versions of his favourite songs performed by artists on his label. He recognised that he was not musical and lacked technical ability and experience and decided early on to give the musicians flexibility in their interpretations. He viewed the "Sixteen Days / Gathering Dust" track as "stiff and overlong" and gave Fraser full control of the production. He later said that he "loved the experience of affecting the sound of a record, but it wasn't my place to impose anything. So I needed to create a situation where people gave me sounds that I could have ideas about."

This Mortal Coil never performed live, although the Cocteau Twins played "Song to the Siren" several times in the mid-1980s, and Brendan Perry of Dead Can Dance frequently performs the song during solo performances.

== Recording ==
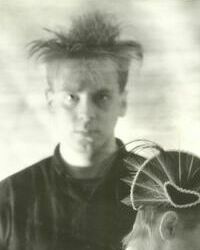
Simon Raymonde in 1986

It'll End in Tears was recorded in 1984 at Eric Radcliffe's Blackwing Studios in Waterloo, south-east London. Blackwing is located inside a deconsecrated building that was formerly All Hallows Church. The studio is best known for recording many of the early 1980s Mute Records bands such as Depeche Mode and Yazoo. (Note: Both the Cocteau Twins' and Dead Can Dance's debut albums, Garlands (1982) and Dead Can Dance (1984), were recorded at Blackwing.) Blackwing was chosen in part because Fryer had worked there with Depeche Mode on their 1981 debut album Speak & Spell.

Simon Raymonde of the Cocteau Twins took on a far larger role than was initially planned. Raymonde somewhat modestly wrote in his 2024 biography that he was just a "gun for hire [...] playing under direction", given that he was not paid either the usual flat fee or a royalty percentage. Across the three This Mortal Coil albums, Raymonde played on twelve separate tracks, including on several of his own compositions.

When arriving at the studio, the musicians were typically unaware of what tracks they would be asked to interpret. Once given a title, Watts-Russell provided only vague instructions on how to approach it. Raymonde recalls that on his first day, he was told to listen to Big Star's 1974 song "Kangaroo" and provide a "minimalist take" with the bass guitar as the dominant instrument. Similarly, before recording "The Last Wish", Raymonde was given a simple drum pattern and asked to come up with a bass line within the next half-hour. When he did so, Watts-Russell said it sounded good and "let's record it". Soon after, Guthrie entered the studio, according to Raymonde, "for an hour or so", and recorded his guitar part. After the early parts were laid down, the musicians could add additional layering and instrumentation.

== Music and lyrics ==
=== Side one ===
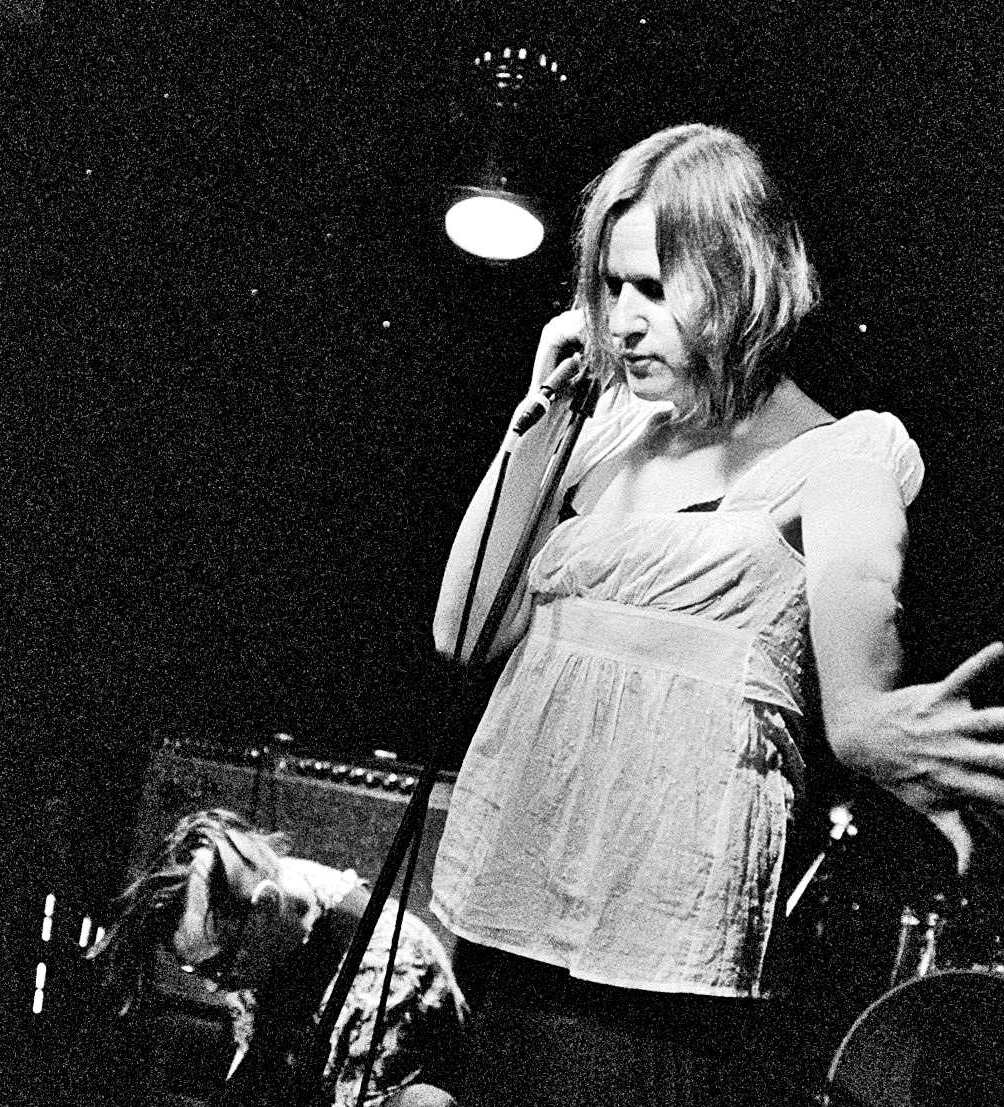
Cindy Sharp (aka Cinder) performing in 2009. Sharp sings "Kangaroo", "Fond Affections" and "A Single Wish".

The album opens with "Kangaroo", the first of two covers from Big Star's album Third/Sister Lovers, recorded in 1974. Although Big Star's singer and songwriter Alex Chilton's music was largely forgotten by the early 1980s, the track was a favourite of Watts-Russell's: he described it as "a cross between the Velvet Underground and Syd Barrett on heroin". Cindy Sharp of Cindytalk provided vocals, accompanied by an arrangement by Raymonde, who stripped the music to a dominant bass-line played with a pick on an eight-string Ibanez Musician bass. He is accompanied by a flute played by Raymonde on a Yamaha DX7 and cello parts added by Martin McCarrick of Siouxsie and the Banshees.

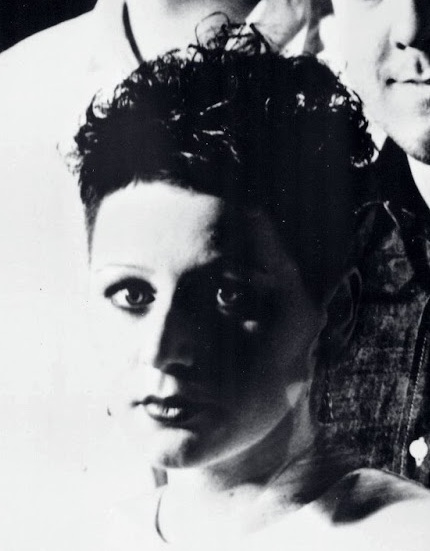
Elizabeth Fraser provides vocals for "Song to the Siren" and "Another Day".

The cover of Buckley and Larry Beckett's "Song to the Siren" is by far the album's best-known track. It is sung by Fraser, with sparse guitar parts added by Guthrie. The song's eerie and affecting lyrics contain what Aston calls "images of the sea, doomed romance and drowning", which Watts-Russell describes as alluding to "the inevitable damage that love causes". The original is sung from the point of view of a sailor encountering sirens from Homer's Odyssey; however, Fraser's vocals seem to reverse the roles in that she becomes the siren. The Cocteau Twins were unhappy with the track's commercial success. They worried that it would overshadow their own careers and resented not being given royalties. Guthrie later said that he "hated" the original versions of the songs TMC had covered and found TMC "pretentious and miserable".

The second Big Star cover, "Holocaust", was arranged by Raymond and sung by Howard Devoto of the Buzzcocks and Magazine. The original was written when Chilton was at a low point in his life and contains numerous allusions to addiction. Devoto said that he "knew the name Big Star, but not their music", but agreed to participate, having been impressed by the cover of "Song to the Siren".

"Fond Affections" is a cover of a 1980 song by 4AD band Rema-Rema, written by Gary Asquith and Marco Pirroni (formerly of Adam and the Ants). In the TMC version, Sharp sings over Raymonde's sparse arrangement. Both the vocals and music differ significantly from the theatrical original.

=== Side two ===
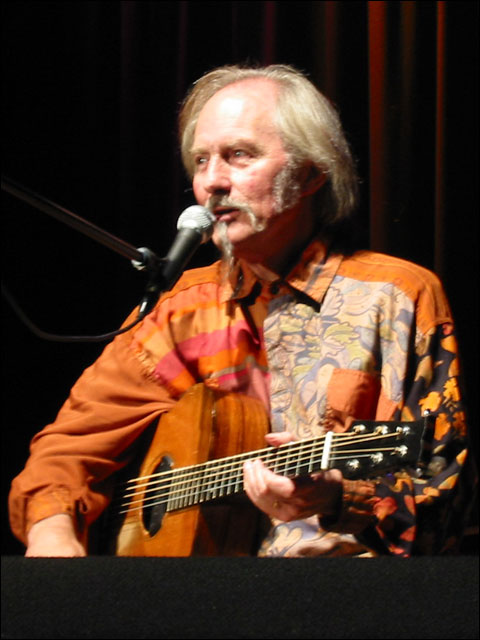
Roy Harper performing in 2001

Side two opens with a cover of Roy Harper's 1970 song "Another Day", sung by Fraser. The original was described by the critic Peter Beaumont as a "story of a recollected affair in the domestic setting of his past lover's home [...] prefiguring the idea that whatever happens, the time for second chances has long passed." Guthrie was against the song's inclusion, as he viewed it as progressive rock sung by "earnest bearded men". While the cover led to renewed interest in Harper's career, both critics and Harper himself agree that Fraser's vocals elevate the original. However, Watts-Russell was unhappy with the outcome of the track and considered editing out some of what he described as Fraser's "Kate Bush-isms"; at the time of recording, she was transitioning from her early gothic vocal style towards the emotive and expansive vocals for which she is best known, and so may have been experimenting ith her vocal range.

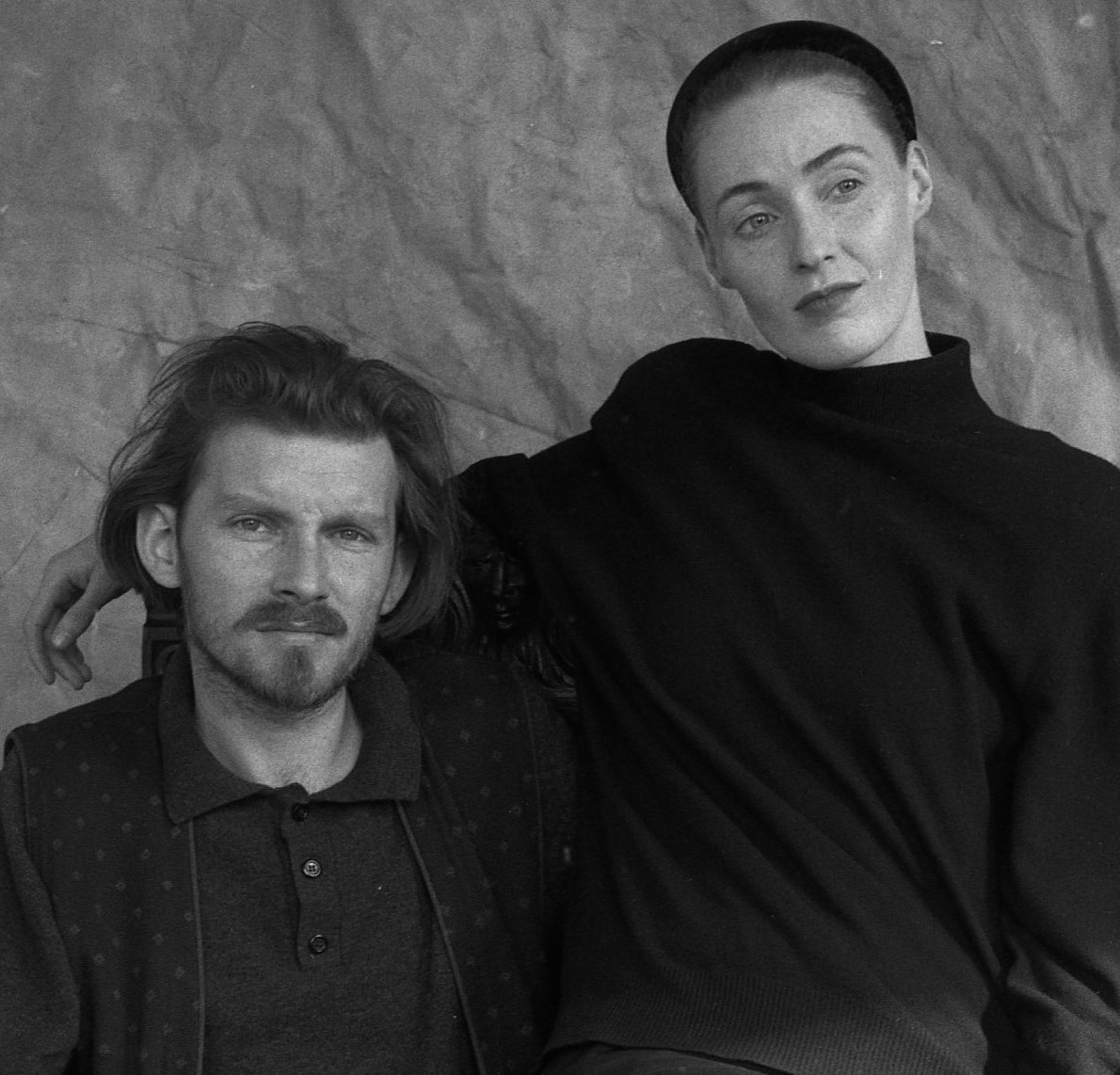
Brendan Perry and Lisa Gerrard of Dead Can Dance, 1989

Both "Waves Become Wings" and "Dreams Made Flesh" were written and sung by Lisa Gerrard of Dead Can Dance. Watts-Russell had asked her to contribute a cover, but she asked if she could instead contribute one of her own compositions. Watts-Russell was impressed by her recording, which was eventually split into the songs "Waves Become Wings" and "Dreams Made Flesh". The instrumental "Barramundi" separates Gerrard's two tracks; composed and arranged by Raymonde, it consists of his guitar parts overlaid with the Yamaha DX7 synthesiser. The music for Gerrard's second track, "Dreams Made Flesh", is dominated by her yangqin (a Chinese hammered dulcimer), with rhythm parts played on a bass drum by Perry.

Robbie Grey of Modern English sings "Not Me", a cover of a 1980 track by Colin Newman of the post-punk band Wire, from his album A–Z.

The album closes with "A Single Wish", which began with a piano figure by Steven Young of Colourbox. Raymonde then arranged it and added additional instrumentation. The song is largely instrumental and closes with Sharp's vocal part. The cello sound was added by Raymonde using a Gizmotron, a mechanical effects device that emulates bowing and has a rapid natural attack. Because the Gizmotron is particularly challenging to control, the recording proved very difficult.

== Cover art ==
The photographs for the record sleeves were taken by Nigel Grierson and arranged by the graphic designer Vaughan Oliver; both were founding members of 4AD's in-house design team 23 Envelope. (Note: 23 Envelope was rebranded as v23 in 1988 after Oliver established a separate freelance company.) The black-and-white and out-of-focus photograph shows the visual artist and model Yvette (later known as Pallas Citroen), who was then studying for her final secondary-level exams, but was a friend of members of Modern English. She remembers a brief photography session where Grierson "pulled some branches down from a tree, waved them in front of the lights, and took the shots".

Grierson described the front cover as an attempt to "create an intriguing image, influenced by [...] the subconscious [...] and scenes from David Lynch's Eraserhead, and Luis Buñuel's Los Olvidados—eyes closed, hair pulled back." The cover has been widely praised. Writing for The Guardian in 1996, the critic Susan Corrigan wrote that It'll End in Tears' cover helped establish the "spooky, ethereal 4AD aesthetic" which the label became renowned for.

== Release ==
It'll End in Tears was first released on 1 October 1984. It exceeded expectations by reaching the UK Top 40. Encouraged by domestic sales and anticipating that "Song to the Siren" could be used in a film, Watts-Russell laicensed the album to Atlantic Records in the US. However, after selling just eight thousand copies in a year, Atlantic deleted it from its catalogue. Soon after, Watts-Russell sold another three thousand records there on import.

== Reception ==
Professional ratings
Review scores
Source	Rating
AllMusic	4.5/5 stars
Mojo	4/5 stars
Pitchfork	9.0/10

It'll End in Tears was universally acclaimed on release and praised by the music weeklies Melody Maker and the NME. Critics often praise Fryer's production. In 2011, the critic Ned Raggett described the album as maintaining "a mood of poised, shadowy romanticism, part dark ambient grind and part late-night string-laden recital". A 2018 Pitchfork list ranked the album as number eight on its list of "The 30 Best Dream Pop Albums".

Writing for The Guardian in 2006, the writer and critic Dorian Lynskey listed TMC's version of "Song to the Siren" as number 7 in his list of "Covers that are better than the original songs". He concluded that "by turning...Buckley's song...into a tremulous ambient hymn...the original version seems like a mere sketch".

A 2018 review by Classic Pop described the album as "swathed in lush, gothic-romantic swirls of echo and reverb". The review describes Devoto's vocals as "like a hollow, haunted phantom" and praises both Sharp's and Gerrard's vocals as "ghostly", before concluding that Fraser's contribution on "Song to the Siren" is the standout performance. Numerous other critics have praised Sharp's vocals, which, according to Raggett, extend "from operatic bravura on 'Kanga Roo' to the closing tenderness of "A Single Wish".

== Influence ==
It'll End in Tears helped resurrect the careers of Tim Buckley and Alex Chilton and led to renewed interest in Roy Harper's back catalogue. Because of "Song to the Siren"'s success, Buckley's album Starsailor has become his best-known album.

The album's atmospheric and melancholic sound has been hugely influential. It is cited as "defining" by numerous bands and artists, including Anohni and the Johnsons, Bat for Lashes, Perfume Genius and Amen Dunes. Both Anohni and Beach House have cited "Song to the Siren" as specifically important. Many other artists have adapted TMC's cover versions—described by the critic Sean O'Neal as "covers of covers".

== Track listing ==
Side one
No.	Title	Writer(s)	Arranged by	Length
1.	"Kangaroo"	Alex Chilton	Cindy Sharp, Simon Raymonde	3:30
2.	"Song to the Siren"	Larry Beckett, Tim Buckley	Elizabeth Fraser, Robin Guthrie	3:30
3.	"Holocaust"	Chilton	Raymonde	3:38
4.	"Fyt"	Ivo Watts-Russell, John Fryer	Watts-Russell	4:23
5.	"Fond Affections"	Rema-Rema	Sharp	3:50
6.	"The Last Ray"	Watts-Russell, Guthrie, Raymonde	Raymonde	4:08

Side two
No.	Title	Writer(s)	Arranged by	Length
1.	"Another Day"	Roy Harper	Fraser	2:54
2.	"Waves Become Wings"	Lisa Gerrard	Lisa Gerrard	4:25
3.	"Barramundi"	Raymonde	Raymonde	3:56
4.	"Dreams Made Flesh"	Gerrard	Gerrard	3:48
5.	"Not Me"	Colin Newman	Robbie Grey, Raymonde	3:44
6.	"A Single Wish"	Sharp, Steven Young, Raymonde	Sharp	2:26

== Personnel ==
- Ivo Watts-Russell – conception, production
- John Fryer – production
- Simon Raymonde – production, arrangements, guitar, bass, synthesiser
- Elizabeth Fraser – vocals
- Cindy Sharp – vocals
- Lisa Gerrard – vocals, yangqin, accordion
- Robbie Grey – vocals
- Howard Devoto – vocals
- Robin Guthrie – guitar
- Brendan Perry – bass drone
- Martyn Young – synthesizer, bass, guitar
- Mark Cox – synthesizer
- Steven Young – piano
- Manuela Rickers – guitar
- Martin McCarrick – cello
- Gini Ball – violin, viola

== Charts ==
Chart (1984–85)	Peak position
New Zealand RIANZ Albums Chart	42
UK Albums Chart	38
UK Independent Albums Chart	1

=== Singles ===
- "Song to the Siren" – No. 66 UK Singles Chart (2 weeks), No. 3 UK Indie Chart (101 weeks), No. 8 NZ (15 weeks), No. 39 NL (4 weeks); released September 1983.
- "Kangaroo" – No. 2 UK Indie Chart (20 weeks); released August 1984.

== Sources ==
- Aston, Martin (2013). Facing the Other Way: The Story of 4AD. London: The Friday Project. ISBN 978-0-0074-8961-9.
- Aston, Martin (December 2018). "This Mortal Coil: It'll End in Tears". Mojo. No. 301. p. 104.
- Aston, Martin (17 November 2011). "Song to the Siren's irresistible tang". The Guardian. Archived from the original on 15 June 2022.
- Aston, Martin (1986). "Alex Chilton (1986): transcript". Rock's Backpages.
- Beaumont, Peter (28 June 2012). "Old Music: Roy Harper – Another Day". The Guardian.
- Buckley, Peter (2003). The Rough Guide to Rock. London: Rough Guides. ISBN 1-8582-8457-0.
- Brazier, Lottie (3 December 2018). "The Strange World Of... This Mortal Coil". The Quietus. Archived from the original on 21 May 2025.
- Corrigan, Susan (18 March 1996). "Album covers: New tricks up their sleeve". The Guardian. Archived from the original on 11 January 2025.
- Dellar, Fred (2 April 1994). "Tim Buckley: Mourning Glory". New Musical Express.
- Gomez-Palacio, Bryony (2011). Graphic Design, Referenced: A Visual Guide to the Language, Applications, and History of Graphic Design. Rockport Publishers. ISBN 978-1-5925-3742-6.
- Lynskey, Dorian (13 January 2006). "Readers Recommend: Covers That Are Better Than the Original Songs". The Guardian.
- Joynson, Vernon (2023). Discover UK Shoegaze and Dream Pop: A Music Guide to Shoegaze and Dream Pop. Dublin: Borderline Productions. ISBN 978-1-8998-5525-4.
- Mason, Stewart. "It'll End in Tears – This Mortal Coil". AllMusic. Archived from the original on 20 April 2025.
- O'Neal, Sean (10 December 2018). "How a Bunch of Romantic Goths Changed Music As We Know It". Vulture. Archived from the original on 24 February 2024.
- Poynor, Rick (2000). Vaughan Oliver: Visceral Pleasures. London: Booth-Clibborn Editions. ISBN 1-8615-4072-8.
- Raggett, Ned (8 December 2011). "This Mortal Coil: It'll End in Tears / Filigree & Shadow / Blood / Dust & Guitars". Pitchfork. Archived from the original on 14 June 2025.
- Raymonde, Simon (2024). In One Ear: Cocteau Twins, Ivor Raymonde and Me. London: Nine Eight Books. ISBN 978-1-7887-0938-5.
- Reynolds, Simon (4 October 1986). "This Mortal Coil: Shadow Play". Melody Maker.
- Rowley, Scott (20 December 2024). "Big Star Wrote It, Jamie T Sampled It, and It Was One of Jeff Buckley's Favourite Songs. The Story of the Sleazy Song That Was Re-imagined to Capture "the Beauty of Despair"". Louder. Archived from the original on 8 June 2025.
- Simpson, Paul. "Cindytalk Biography". Allmusic. Archived from the original on 30 October 2025.
- Ulrich, Peter (2022). Drumming with Dead Can Dance: and Parallel Adventures. Pasadena (CA): Red Hen Press. ISBN 978-1-6362-8073-8.
- Wilde, Jon (October 1983). "Cocteau Twins: Two's Company". ZigZag.
