= Babacar (Babacar album) =

Studio album by Babacar
- Released: 1998
- Genre: Rock
- Length: 48:58
- Label: Absolute A Go Go

Professional ratings
Review scores
Source	Rating
Allmusic	3/5 stars

Babacar is the only album by the British rock group Babacar.

== Critical reception ==
Allmusic reviewer Ajda Snyder calls it "patient and breezy, with mostly clean guitar sounds" and the songs "on the whole, pleasant and trippy." Snyder wrote that singer Caroline Crawley possessed "a very unique and recognizable voice. The subject matter of her lyrics includes all things natural, such as landscapes and fauna, and she sings softly but firmly with a thoughtless confidence."

== Track listing ==
No.	Title	Length
1.	"Midsummer"	4:07
2.	"Mesmer"	3:52
3.	"Mantra"	5:21
4.	"Silence"	4:06
5.	"Decideum"	3:23
6.	"Tree"	4:37
7.	"Waiting"	5:22
8.	"The River in Me"	3:37
9.	"Babacar"	4:18
10.	"Freefall"	4:00
11.	"Peace"	6:15

== Personnel ==
Babacar

- Caroline Crawley - vocals
- Roberto Soave - bass guitar
- Rob Steen - guitar
- Boris Williams - drums

Additional personnel

- Bruno Ellingham - violin
- Tristan Powell - e-bow
- Porl Thompson - guitar, banjo
- Hebe Lucraft - artwork
