= The Hope Blister =

British band

- Genres: Ambient, ethereal wave, dream pop
- Years active: 1997–1999
- Spinoff of: This Mortal Coil
- Past members: Louise Rutkowski; Laurence O'Keefe; Audrey Riley

The Hope Blister were an ambient band active from 1997 to 1999. The band was directed by 4AD Records founder Ivo Watts-Russell, with the music played by singer Louise Rutkowski, bass player Laurence O'Keefe and string arranger Audrey Riley.

The band grew out of the This Mortal Coil project, but with a fixed line-up and focused on cover versions. They released two albums, ...Smile's OK in 1998 and Underarms (featuring vocals by Momus) in 1999, with the band splitting that year following Watts-Russell's retirement from the music industry. An expanded version of Underarms was released in 2005 as Underarms and Sideways, featuring a bonus disc of remixes.

== Discography ==
- ...Smile's OK (25 May 1998)
- Underarms (15 March 1999)
- Underarms and Sideways (12 December 2005)
