= Babacar (band) =

British rock band

- Babacar in 1998 (L-R: Rob Steen, Caroline Crawley, Jemaur Tayle, Roberto Soave, Boris Williams)

Background information
- Origin: England
- Genres: Rock
- Label: Absolute A Go Go
- Past members: Caroline Crawley; Roberto Soave; Rob Steen; Jemaur Tayle; Boris Williams

Babacar was a rock supergroup formed in England, featuring former members of Shelleyan Orphan, the Cure, and Presence. The group released a self-titled album in 1998.

== History ==
Before forming Babacar, vocalist Caroline Crawley was a member of Shelleyan Orphan until their breakup in 1993. Several other members had associations with The Cure. Drummer Boris Williams (longtime partner of Crawley) was the Cure's drummer until 1994. Bassist Roberto Soave had occasionally filled in for Cure bassist Simon Gallup. Soave and guitarist Rob Steen had previously been members of Presence which had been founded by another former member of the Cure, Lol Tolhurst. Soave and Williams had also collaborated with Shelleyan Orphan.

The band released their self-titled debut album in the UK in 1997 and in the US in 1998. The album included a guest appearance by another former Cure member, Porl Thompson. Another member of Shelleyan Orphan, guitarist Jemaur Tayle, later joined the band. The band dissolved in 2000.

== Members ==
- Caroline Crawley – vocals
- Roberto Soave – bass guitar
- Rob Steen - guitar
- Jemaur Tayle – guitar
- Boris Williams – drums

=== Special guests/additional personnel ===
- Porl Thompson – guitar, banjo
- Bruno Ellingham – violin
- Tristan Powell – e-bow

== Discography ==
=== Albums ===
- Babacar (1998)

=== Singles ===
- "Midsummer"

=== B-sides ===
- "Butterfly"
- "Celtic Air"
