= Flashes from the Archives of Oblivion =

Live album by Roy Harper
- Released: November 1974
- Length: 85:07
- Labels: Harvest (UK); Chrysalis (U.S.); Awareness AWLD 1012 / AWCDD 1012 (UK); Resurgent (UK)
- Producer: Peter Jenner

Roy Harper chronology
Valentine (1974)	Flashes from the Archives of Oblivion (1974)	HQ (1975)

Roy Harper live album chronology
Flashes from the Archives of Oblivion (1974)	Live at the Red Lion, Birmingham (1985)

Flashes from the Archives of Oblivion is a live double album released in 1974 by Roy Harper.

== History ==
The album's liner notes state the tracks were "recorded at various concerts in England at one time or another". Two of the songs were recorded on Valentine's Day at a concert dubbed "Roy Harper's Valentine Day Massacre" to mark the release of Harper's 1974 album Valentine. That concert took place at London's Rainbow Theatre where Harper performed alongside Jimmy Page, John Bonham (on acoustic guitar), David Bedford, Max Middleton, Ronnie Lane and Keith Moon. Though not heard on the record, Robert Plant introduced the concert. Harper's son Nick Harper also made an appearance, telling knock-knock jokes to Moon.

The initial printing of the album cover caused a strike among female workers at the EMI factory in Hayes when shop stewards found the picture of a naked man in that week's new releases. The naked man is Harper himself, wearing a pair of football socks in the colours of his favourite football team, Manchester City F.C.

In 1989 the album was reissued on Awareness Records. The track list was slightly altered so the album would fit onto a single CD. As a result, three tracks — "Home" (Studio version), "Too Many Movies", and "Home" — were appended onto the 1989 Awareness' reissue of Harper's 1974 release Valentine.

== Track listing ==
All tracks credited to Roy Harper

=== Side one - "Easy Listening" ===
1. "Home (Studio version)
2. "Commune"
3. "Don't You Grieve"
4. "Twelve Hours of Sunset"
5. "Kangaroo Blues"

=== Side two - "Middle of the Road" ===
1. "All Ireland"
2. "Me and My Woman"
3. "South Africa"

=== Side three - "Interference (courtesy Nick Webb)" ===
1. "Highway Blues"
2. "One Man Rock & Roll Band"

=== Side four - "The Great Divider" ===
1. "Another Day"
2. "M.C.P. Blues"
3. "Too Many Movies"
4. "Home"

=== Track list on 1989 CD reissue ===
1. "Commune"
2. "Don't You Grieve"
3. "Twelve Hours of Sunset"
4. "Kangaroo Blues"
5. "All Ireland"
6. "Me and My Woman"
7. "South Africa"
8. "Highway Blues"
9. "One Man Rock & Roll Band"
10. "Another Day"
11. "M.C.P. Blues"

== Personnel ==
- Ian Tilbury - presenter
- John Leckie - engineer
