= Extractions (album) =

Studio album by Dif Juz
- Released: 1 July 1985
- Recorded: 6–20 April 1985
- Studios: Palladium Studios, Edinburgh
- Genre: Dream pop
- Length: 38:06
- Label: 4AD
- Producer: Robin Guthrie

Dif Juz chronology
| Time Clock Turn Back (1983) | Extractions (1985) |

Extractions is the third studio album by English band Dif Juz, released in 1985 by record label 4AD.

== Recording ==
Extractions was recorded in April 1985 at Palladium Studios, Edinburgh, with Robin Guthrie of Cocteau Twins as producer and Keith Mitchell as engineer. Cocteau Twins singer Elizabeth Fraser provides guest vocals on track 5.

It was less ambient than the band's previous works while retaining the same "moody" tone. It included additions like saxophone, unconventional percussion, and increased studio experimentation.

== Reception ==
Professional ratings
Review scores
| Source | Rating |
|---|---|
| AllMusic | 4/5 stars |
| Trouser Press | mixed |

AllMusic called it "a gripping, involving instrumental masterpiece" and praised Guthrie's "echo-laden" production. Trouser Press, on the other hand, wrote: "As an instrumental band, Dif Juz must be vigilant not to fall into the nice-sound-few-ideas trap. They get by on Extractions, but just barely." Long Live Vinyl credited the album with expanding on the era's dream pop sound.

== Track listing ==
All tracks written by Dif Juz.

Side one

1. "Crosswinds" - 7:43
2. "A Starting Point" - 3:39
3. "Silver Passage" - 3:55
4. "The Last Day" - 4:01

Side two

5. "Love Insane" - 3:11
6. "Marooned" - 4:02
7. "Two Fine Days (And a Thunderstorm)" - 2:29
8. "Echo Wreck" - 4:37
9. "Twin and Earth" - 4:29

== Personnel ==
Dif Juz

- Alan Curtis
- David Curtis
- Gary Bromley
- Richard Thomas

Additional Personnel

- Elizabeth Fraser - voice (track 5)
