= This Mortal Coil =

1983–1991 British musical collective

- Origin: Wandsworth, South London, England
- Genres: Dream pop; gothic rock; ethereal wave
- Years active: 1983–1991
- Label: 4AD
- Spinoffs: The Hope Blister
- Past members: Ivo Watts-Russell; John Fryer

This Mortal Coil were a British music collective led by Ivo Watts-Russell, founder of the British record label 4AD. Although Watts-Russell and John Fryer were the only two official members, the band's recorded output featured a large rotating cast of supporting artists, many of whom were otherwise associated with 4AD, including members of Cocteau Twins, Cindytalk, Dead Can Dance, Breathless, The Breeders and Belly.

The project is known for its gothic, dream pop and ethereal wave sound. Throughout their run, they released one extended play (EP), Sixteen Days / Gathering Dust, and three studio albums: It'll End in Tears (1984), Filigree & Shadow (1986) and Blood (1991). The former produced their modestly successful cover of Tim Buckley's "Song to the Siren", which peaked at number 66 on the UK Singles Chart. After the group broke up in 1991, former member Watts-Russell formed the similar group The Hope Blister.

== History ==
Watts-Russell had founded 4AD in 1980, and the label established itself as one of the key labels in the British post-punk movement. Following several releases, Watts-Russell developed the idea of collaborating under the name This Mortal Coil. The name is taken from a line in the song Dream Within a Dream by Spirit ("...Stepping off this mortal coil will be my pleasure..."), which in turn alludes to Shakespeare's Hamlet ("... what dreams may come, when we have shuffled off this mortal coil...").

The 4AD website said:

This Mortal Coil was not a band, but a unique collaboration of musicians recording in various permutations, the brainchild of 4AD kingpin Ivo Watts-Russell. The idea was to allow artists the creative freedom to record material outside of the realm of what was expected of them; it also created the opportunity for innovative cover versions of songs personal to Ivo.

One of the label's earliest signings was Modern English. In 1983, Watts-Russell suggested that the band re-record two of its earliest songs, "Sixteen Days" and "Gathering Dust", as a medley. At the time, the band was closing its set with this medley, and Watts-Russell felt it was strong enough to warrant a re-recording. When the band rebuffed the idea, Watts-Russell decided to assemble a group of musicians to record the medley: Elizabeth Fraser and Robin Guthrie of Cocteau Twins; Gordon Sharp of Cindytalk (later known as Cindy Sharp or Cinder); and a few members of Modern English. An EP, Sixteen Days/Gathering Dust, resulted from these sessions. A cover of Tim Buckley's "Song to the Siren", performed by Fraser and Guthrie alone, was recorded as a B-side for the EP. Pleased with the results, Watts-Russell decided to make this the A-side of the 7" single version of the EP, and the song quickly became an underground hit, leading Watts-Russell to pursue the recording of a full album under the This Mortal Coil moniker, 1984's It'll End in Tears.

In June 1998, Watts-Russell began releasing albums in a similar vein to his TMC projects, under the name The Hope Blister.

== Discography ==
=== Albums ===
==== Studio albums ====
Title	Album details	Peak chart positions			
Title	Album details	UK	UK Indie	NL	NZ
It'll End in Tears	Released: 8 October 1984; Label: 4AD; Formats: LP, MC	38	1	—	42
Filigree & Shadow	Released: 22 September 1986; Label: 4AD; Formats: CD, 2xLP, 2xMC	53	2	—	—
Blood	Released: 22 April 1991; Label: 4AD; Formats: CD, 2xLP, MC	28	—	58	—
"—" denotes releases that did not chart or were not released in that territory.

==== Compilation albums ====
Title	Album details
Dust & Guitars	Released: 6 August 2012; Label: 4AD; Formats: HDCD, digital download

==== Box sets ====
Title	Album details
1983–1991	Released: 30 March 1993; Label: 4AD; Formats: 4xCD
This Mortal Coil	Released: 7 November 2011; Label: 4AD; Formats: 4xHDCD

=== EPs ===
Title	Album details	Peak chart positions
Title	Album details	UK
Sixteen Days / Gathering Dust	Released: 2 September 1983; Label: 4AD; Formats: 12"	100

=== Singles ===
Title	Year	Peak chart positions					Album
Title	Year	UK	UK Indie	BE (FL)	NL	NZ	Album
"Song to the Siren"	1983	66	3	—	39	8	It'll End in Tears
"Kangaroo"	1984	92	2	—	—	—	It'll End in Tears
"Come Here My Love"/"Drugs" (limited release)	1986	90	2	—	—	—	Filigree & Shadow
"You and Your Sister" (Benelux and France-only release)	1991	—	—	42	13	—	Blood
"—" denotes releases that did not chart or were not released in that territory.

=== Contributions ===
- "Acid, Bitter and Sad" on Lonely Is an Eyesore (1987)

== Sources ==
- Aston, Martin (2013). Facing the Other Way: The Story of 4AD. London: The Friday Project. ISBN 978-0-00-748961-9.
- Oliver, Vaughan; Poynor, Rick (2000). Vaughan Oliver: Visceral Pleasures. London: Booth-Clibborn Editions. ISBN 1-86154-072-8.
- Raymonde, Simon (2024). In One Ear: Cocteau Twins, Ivor Raymonde and Me. London: Nine Eight Books. ISBN 978-1-78870-938-5.
- Ulrich, Peter (2022). Drumming with Dead Can Dance: and Parallel Adventures. Pasadena (CA): Red Hen Press. ISBN 978-1-6362-8073-8.
