= Dream pop =

Music genre

- Stylistic origins: Alternative rock; neo-psychedelia; ethereal wave; gothic rock; indie pop
- Cultural origins: 1980s, United Kingdom, United States
- Derivative forms: Shoegaze; chillwave

Fusion genres
- Ambient pop

Other topics
- List of dream pop artists; indie pop; post-rock; psychedelic pop

Dream pop is a subgenre of alternative rock and neo-psychedelia that emphasizes atmosphere and sonic texture as strongly as it does pop melody. Common characteristics include breathy vocals, dense productions, and effects such as reverb, echo, tremolo, and chorus. It often overlaps with the related genre of shoegaze, and the two genre terms have at times been used interchangeably.

Dream pop came into prominence in the 1980s through groups associated with the UK label 4AD, most prominently the Scottish band Cocteau Twins and the collective group This Mortal Coil, and later A.R. Kane, who are credited with coining the term. During the late 1980s to early 1990s, the genre saw further proliferation through UK-based artists such as My Bloody Valentine, Slowdive, and Lush alongside US-based acts Galaxie 500, Julee Cruise, and Mazzy Star. By the late 2000s, the sound saw renewed popularity among millennial listeners through bands such as Beach House.

== Etymology and characteristics ==
"Dreampop" was coined by Alex Ayuli of A.R. Kane to describe the duo's sound in the late 1980s. Although distinct from shoegaze, both terms have sometimes been used interchangeably, and the style overlaps with much indie rock, indie pop and synth pop. According to Pitchfork editors, the term "was always more of a descriptor than a proper genre" and its defining features are "atmosphere, intimacy, a light coating of psychedelia, and, yes, dreaminess." It is thought to relate to the listener's "immersion" in the music.

Chorus and echo effects, as heard on electric guitar.
A demonstration of sound effects commonly used in dream pop.

The AllMusic Guide to Electronica defines dream pop as "an atmospheric subgenre of alternative rock that relies on sonic textures as much as melody". According to Paste staff, the genre emphasizes mood and sonics over lyrics, so that "chords and tracks blur seamlessly into one another so frequently that it can be difficult to even decipher when one song ended and another has begun." Common characteristics are breathy vocals, guitar effects, and a densely produced sound, with "nebulous, distorted guitars" paired with "murmured vocals sometimes completely smudged into a wall of noise." The music tends to focus on textures rather than propulsive rock riffs. Effects such as reverb and echo are ubiquitous, with tremolo and chorus also heard on recordings to achieve the style's "floaty, surreal, cloud-like haze".

Lyrics are often introspective or existential in nature, but may be difficult to hear or incomprehensible in the mix. Critic Simon Reynolds wrote that dream pop "celebrates rapturous and transcendent experiences, often using druggy and mystical imagery". In 1991, he suggested this escapist tendency might be a response to the cultural landscape of the UK during the 1980s: "After 12 years of Conservative government in Britain, any idealism or constructive political involvement seems futile to these alienated middle-class dropouts." Similarly, according to Rachel Felder, dream pop artists often resist representations of social reality in favour of ambiguous or hallucinogenic experiences. According to Paste, "Dream pop artists aren't poets—they're painters patching together swaths of sound into a big, beautiful landscape."

== History ==
=== 1960s–1970s: origins ===
Author Nathan Wiseman-Trowse writes that the "approach to the sheer physicality of sound" integral to dream pop was "arguably pioneered in popular music by figures such as Phil Spector and (Beach Boys founder) Brian Wilson." The Beach Boys recorded an early dream pop song, "All I Wanna Do", for their 1970 album Sunflower. Critic Jim Allen, who cites the Beach Boys as the style's "godfathers", says the song's unprecedented "cinematic dream sequence" production style marks the point "where the dream pop family tree starts to come into focus." The Beach Boys' impact on the genre was not widely acknowledged until the 2000s.

The 1960s work of the Byrds influenced the "swoony harmonies" of later British dream pop groups. The music of the Velvet Underground in the 1960s and 1970s, which experiments with repetition, tone and texture over conventional song structure, is also an important touchstone in the genre's development. The Velvet Underground & Nico (1967) incorporates what music critic Marc Beamount terms "psychedelic dream pop" in addition to various other styles. Elements of dream pop are also found in Velvet Underground songs such as "Candy Says" (1969).

Music journalist John Bergstrom recognises George Harrison's 1970 track "Let It Down" as a progenitor of the genre, and has said its Spector-produced parent album All Things Must Pass influenced "many guitar-driven, echo-drenched bands [that] have come around since, mixing powerful rave-ups with moody, reflective down-tempo numbers and a spiritual bent".

=== Early 1980s: emergence and development ===
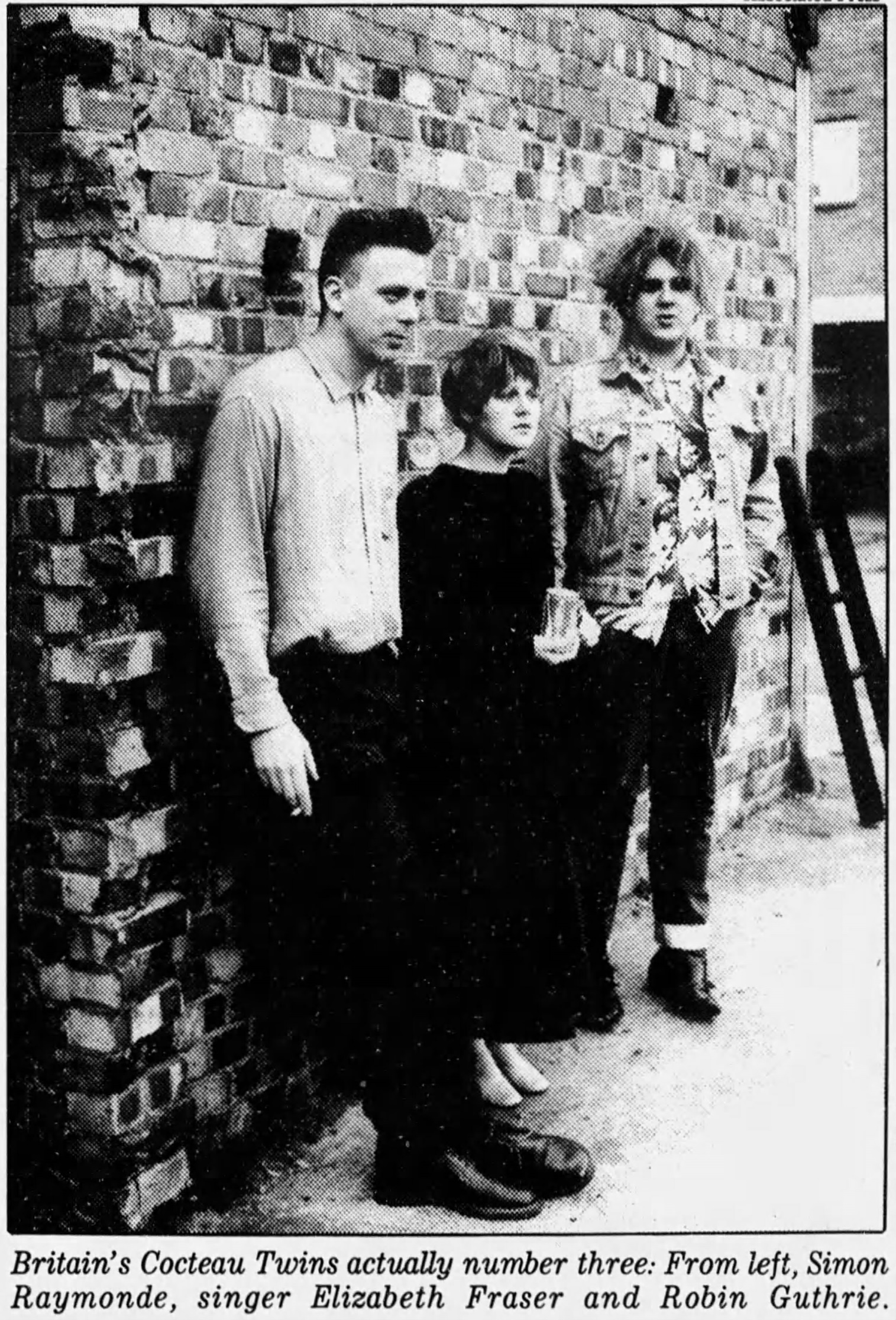
Newspaper clipping of Cocteau Twins, 1985

A.J. Ramirez of PopMatters recognises an evolutionary line from gothic rock to dream pop. The early 1980s gothic-derived "ethereal wave" subgenre, with its effects-laden guitar sounds and female vocals, led to the dream pop and shoegaze scenes; it was represented by Cocteau Twins and labels such as 4AD and Projekt Records. Rolling Stone describes "modern dream pop" as originating with the early 1980s work of Cocteau Twins and their contemporaries. AllMusic's Jason Ankeny credits Cocteau Twins' "distinctly ethereal" sound and singer Elizabeth Fraser's operatic, indecipherable vocals with defining their label, the UK-based 4AD. According to Paste, the band crystallized their "swelling, euphoric" dream pop sound on the 1984 album Treasure, with guitarist Robin Guthrie conjuring an array of "woozy textures from his arsenal of effects pedals."

The 1984 album It'll End in Tears by 4AD's "dream-pop supergroup" This Mortal Coil was conceived by label head Ivo Watts-Russell and featured members of Cocteau Twins and Dead Can Dance. The album helped "set the template for dream pop" and associated the formerly gothic-affiliated UK label with the style. The album's 1983 lead single, the Tim Buckley cover "Song to the Siren", was an influential work in the genre, and saw success in the UK Indie Chart, remaining there consistently for two years.

Other early UK acts to touch on the style included Lori and the Chameleons, Dif Juz, and the Durutti Column. According to Pitchfork, Vini Reilly of the Durutti Column "embodied the cliché of the suicidal dream-pop guitarist in the mid-1980s" with his "narcotic performances" presaging later acts such as My Bloody Valentine and Galaxie 500. The Dif Juz album Extractions (1985) expanded the dream pop sound, incorporating saxophone, shifting tonalities, and off-kilter rhythms.

Film director David Lynch, unable to obtain the rights to This Mortal Coil's version of "Song to the Siren" for his 1986 film Blue Velvet, enlisted composer Angelo Badalamenti and singer Julee Cruise to record a replacement track. The result was "Mysteries of Love", described by Rolling Stone as a significant development of the dream pop sound that "gave the genre its synthy sheen". Cruise's, Lynch's and Badalamenti's 1989 album Floating into the Night further elaborated on the style and featured the Twin Peaks theme and UK top 10 single "Falling".

=== Late 1980s–1990s: shoegaze scene ===
A.R. Kane released their 1987 EP Lollita on 4AD, with production by Cocteau Twins guitarist Robin Guthrie. Their sound blended effects-laden guitar with dub production and drum machine backing, among other elements. Pitchfork called A.R. Kane's 1988 debut album Sixty Nine a "crucial document" of the dream pop movement, writing that the group "aimed to emulate an ethereality that could just as easily become nightmarish". The band described their sound as "dreampop", a label critic Simon Reynolds subsequently adopted to describe that group and later extended to the nascent shoegazing scene in the UK. Reynolds called the movement "a wave of hazy neo-psychedelic groups" characterised by a "blurry, blissful sound" and credited the influence of the "ethereal soundscapes" of Cocteau Twins as well as more distorted styles of American alternative rock.

In the 1990s, "dream pop" and "shoegazing" were interchangeable and regionally dependent terms, with "dream pop" the name by which "shoegazing" was typically known in America. AllMusic says "dream pop" includes both the "loud, shimmering feedback" of My Bloody Valentine and the "post-Velvet Underground guitar rock" of Galaxie 500. My Bloody Valentine showcased a unique dream pop sound on their 1988 debut album Isn't Anything, with guitarist Kevin Shields employing non-standard tuning, reverse reverb FX, and a tremolo-arm technique to produce "an amorphous drone, at once visceral and disembodied". Galaxie 500 provided a "cornerstone" of the genre in their 1989 album On Fire, with their downtempo, reverb-laden sound becoming influential. UK bands acts as A.R. Kane, My Bloody Valentine and Ride played an influential role in the movement's development. Other prominent acts to emerge from the movement include Slowdive and Chapterhouse.

The 1990 Cocteau Twins album Heaven or Las Vegas proved an iconic release in the genre. Spin credited My Bloody Valentine's "landmark" 1991 album Loveless with "crystalizing (and obliterating) the genres of dream pop and shoegaze guitar rock." The UK band Lush became an influential act in the genre during the 1990s, with Robin Guthrie producing their 1992 debut album Spooky. The 1993 album So Tonight That I Might See by American band Mazzy Star reflected a dream pop sound specific to "the glitzy decay that is L.A.", according to Pitchfork; that publication called the album a "dream pop classic". The late 1980s dream pop of A.R. Kane and My Bloody Valentine influenced 1990s acts such as Seefeel and Insides, who began incorporating elements such as samples and sequenced rhythms. Ambient pop music is described by AllMusic as "essentially an extension of the dream pop that emerged in the wake of the shoegazer movement", distinct for its incorporation of electronic textures and techniques such as sampling. Bowery Electric's 1996 album Beat was described by Long Live Vinyl as an important touchstone of both dream pop and trip hop.

=== 21st century ===
The 2007 album Person Pitch by Panda Bear combined Beach Boys-influenced dream pop with modern sampledelic techniques, winning acclaim and exerting wide influence. Much of the music associated with the 2009-coined term "chillwave" can be considered dream pop. (Note: In the opinion of Grantland's David Schilling, the critical discussion surrounding "chillwave" revealed that labels such as "shoegaze" and "dream pop" were ultimately "arbitrary and meaningless".) Baltimore duo Beach House's 2010 album Teen Dream established the group as purveyors of modern dream pop that drew on the "languid reveries" of Cocteau Twins, Mazzy Star and Galaxie 500. The group's success solidified the popularity of dream pop with Millennials. Wild Nothing's Gemini (2010), The Radio Dept.'s Clinging to a Scheme (2010), Chromatics' Kill for Love (2012), and DIIV's Oshin (2012) have all been called some of the best dream pop albums by Pitchfork. I Break Horses's debut Hearts (2011), The Joy Formidable's debut The Big Roar (2011), Alvvays' second album Antisocialites (2017), and Jay Som's second album Everybody Works (2017) were all included on a list titled "The 25 Best Dream Pop Albums of All Time" by Paste Magazine. Rolling Stone described Lana Del Rey's 2014 album Ultraviolence as her rebranding as a "dream-pop heroine".

== See also ==
- List of dream pop artists
- Shoegaze
- Noise pop
- Ethereal wave
- Vaporwave
