= Ivo Watts-Russell =

British music producer and record label executive (born 1954)

- Born: 1954 (age 71–72); Edinburgh, Scotland
- Occupations: Music producer; Record label executive
- Years active: 1977–1999
- Known for: Co-founder of 4AD

Ivo Watts-Russell (born 1954) is a British music producer and record label executive. He was joint-founder with Peter Kent of the independent record label 4AD. He has produced several records, but prefers to use the term "musical director".

== Early years ==
Watts-Russell was born in Northamptonshire, England, the youngest of eight children of Major David Watts-Russell and Gina Spinola (née Baker; died 2018 aged 98). He "never related emotionally" to either of his parents, and grew up "on a dilapidated Northamptonshire estate in an atmosphere of almost Victorian froideur". He was educated at Oundle School. His paternal grandfather, Captain Arthur Egerton Birch, of the Coldstream Guards (son of the colonial administrator Sir Arthur Nonus Birch), took his mother's surname at the age of 21, she being of the Watts-Russell gentry family formerly of Ilam Hall, Staffordshire. Captain Arthur Egerton Watts-Russell married Sylvia Grenfell, of the family of the Barons Grenfell, through whom Ivo Watts-Russell is a cousin of the war poet Julian Grenfell.

In 1977, he joined Beggars Banquet Records as they were starting their label.

== Career ==
One of his better-known productions is the Cocteau Twins' debut album Garlands (1982). He is the namesake of "Ivo", the lead track of Cocteau Twins' 1984 album, Treasure. He also led This Mortal Coil, writing and selecting songs; choosing the personnel for each song; and occasionally playing keyboards. A few years after the release of This Mortal Coil's final studio album, he founded and produced a band called The Hope Blister, which released two albums: ...smile's OK (1998) and Underarms (1999). Although 4AD first released Underarms as a limited edition CD, the label reissued it in 2005 as Underarms and Sideways, the second disc of which has seven remixes by Markus Guentner.

== Later years ==
He sold his half of 4AD to founder and chairman of the Beggars Group Martin Mills in 1999. He moved to Santa Fe in the US where he still lives.
