= Fionn Regan discography =

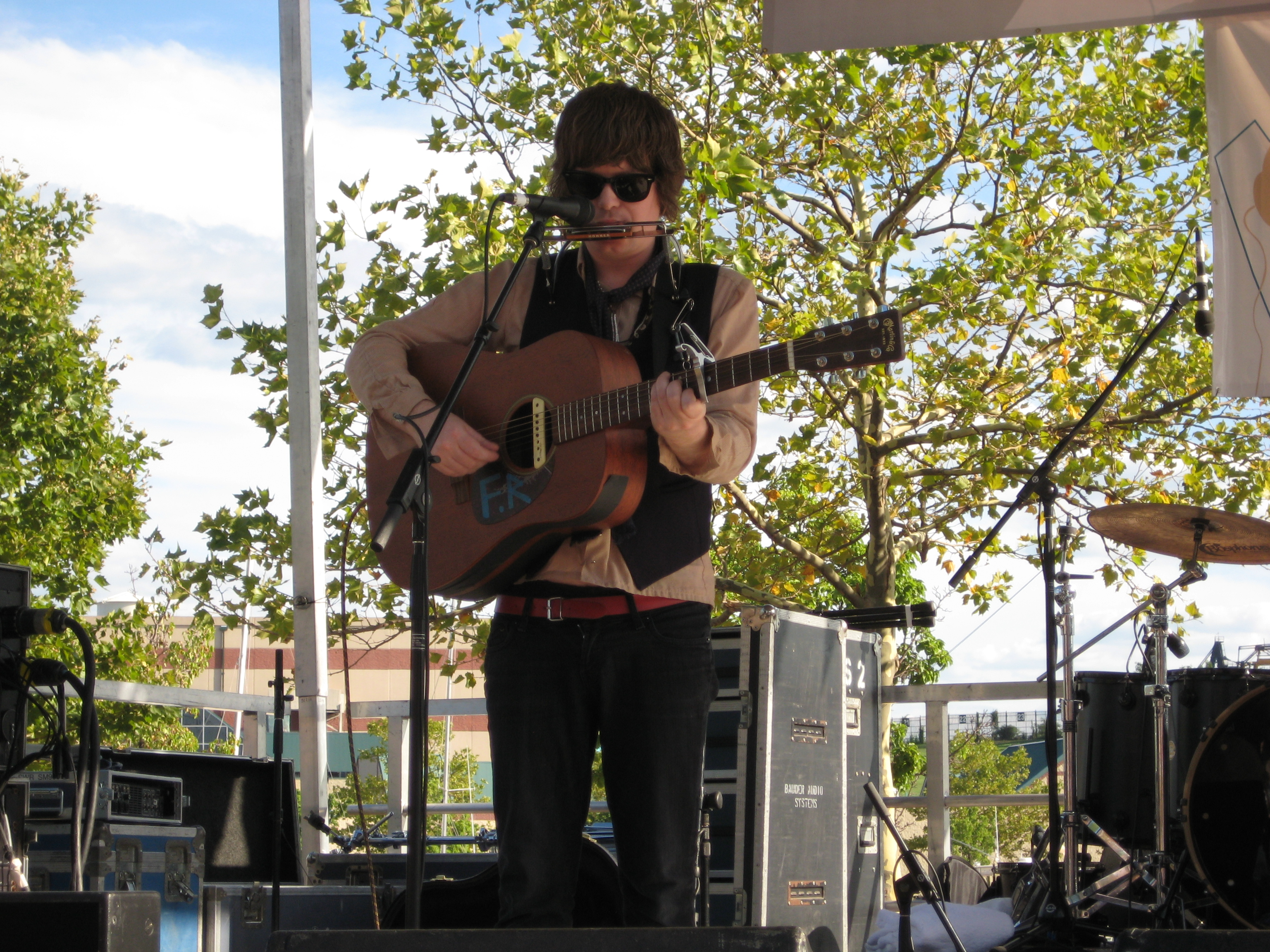
- Fionn Regan performing live in 2007
- Studio albums: 5
- Extended plays: 5
- Singles: 7
- Music videos: 3
- Other: 5

The discography of Fionn Regan, an Irish folk musician and singer-songwriter, consists of five studio albums, five extended plays and seven singles.

Regan began his career in 2000 under the pseudonym "Bilbo" and released the three-song EP Slow Wall. Dropping his stage name in 2002, he released "Little Miss Drunk", a non-album single, and signed to Anvil Records, an independent label based in Brighton, United Kingdom. Regan followed up Slow Wall with the release of his second EP, Reservoir, in January 2003. Regan's final two EPs for Anvil, Hotel Room (2004) and Campaign Button (2005), led him to be signed to Bella Union, an independent label owned by former Cocteau Twins member Simon Raymonde. On Bella Union, Regan released his debut studio album, The End of History, in August 2006. A major critical success, the album was nominated for a number of awards in Ireland, the United Kingdom and the United States, including the Choice Music Prize, the Mercury Prize and the Shortlist Music Prize.

Following constant touring and promotion for The End of History, Regan signed to Lost Highway Records, a United States-based label, and recorded one unreleased album in 2008. Lost Highway refused to release the album, leading Regan to name it The Red Tapes. Relocating back to his native Wicklow, Regan recorded his second studio album, The Shadow of an Empire, and was signed to Heavenly Records. The album was well-received and resulted in two singles: "Protection Racket" and "Catacombs", both of which received extensive airplay. Regan's third studio album, 100 Acres of Sycamore, was released in August 2011 along with a further two singles, and his fourth studio album, The Bunkhouse Vol. 1: Anchor Black Tattoo, was released in September 2012.

== Albums ==
List of studio albums, with chart positions
Title	Album details	Peak chart positions	
Title	Album details	IRL	UK
The End of History	Released: 7 August 2006; Labels: Bella Union (119), Lost Highway (9135); Formats: CD, LP, DD	29	123
The Shadow of an Empire	Released: 5 February 2010; Labels: Heavenly (P75), Universal Ireland (060252727108); Formats: CD, LP, DD	13	169
100 Acres of Sycamore	Released: 8 August 2011; Labels: Heavenly (P88), Universal Ireland (060252771041); Formats: CD, LP, DD	10	—
The Bunkhouse Vol. 1: Anchor Black Tattoo	Released: 7 September 2012; Labels: Universal Ireland (3714741); Formats: CD, DD	36	—
The Meetings of the Waters	Released: 14 April 2017; Labels: Universal Ireland, Abbey; Formats: CD, DD	59	—
Cala	Released: 9 August 2019; Labels: Abbey; Formats: CD, LP, DD	—	—
O AVALANCHE	Released: 1 November 2024; Labels: Nettwerk; Formats: DD	—	—
"—" denotes a release that did not chart.

== Extended plays ==
List of extended plays
Title	Album details
Slow Wall^{[A]}	Released: 6 October 2000; Label: Donkey Boy (2023); Format: CD
Reservoir	Released: 20 January 2003; Label: Anvil (09); Format: CD
Hotel Room	Released: 15 March 2004; Label: Anvil (10); Format: CD
Campaign Button^{[B]}	Released: 19 October 2005; Label: Anvil (13); Format: CD
Home Recording Sampler^{[C]}	Released: 2002; Label: Anvil; Format: CD

== Singles ==
List of singles
Year	Single	Album
2002	"Little Miss Drunk"	Non-album single
2006	"Be Good or Be Gone"	The End of History
2009	"Protection Racket"	The Shadow of an Empire
2010	"Catacombs"	The Shadow of an Empire
2010	"Lines Written in Winter"^{[D]}	The Shadow of an Empire
2011	"For a Nightingale"	100 Acres of Sycamore
2011	"List of Distractions"	100 Acres of Sycamore
2012	"Salt & Cloves"	The Bunkhouse Vol. 1: Anchor Black Tattoo

== Music videos ==
List of music videos, with directors
Year	Title	Director	Ref
2006	"Be Good or Be Gone"	—N/a	—N/a
2007	"Put a Penny in the Slot"	—N/a	—N/a
2010	"Catacombs"	Douglas Hart	
2017	"The Meetings of the Waters"	Yousef Eldin	—N/a
2024	"O AVALANCHE"	Fionn Regan	—N/a

== Other appearances ==
List of compilation appearances and contributions
Year	Song	Album	Notes	Ref
2003	"After the Fall"	Ruby Sessions	From Reservoir.	
2007	"Put a Penny in the Slot"	Acoustic 07	From The End of History.	
2007	"Getting Better"	Mojo Presents Sgt. Pepper... With a Little Help From His Friends	The Beatles cover, from the b-side of "Be Good or Be Gone."	
2008	"Be Good or Be Gone"	Live at the World Cafe, Volume 25: Quarter Notes	From The End of History.	
2008	"Be Good or Be Gone"	Skins 2: The Soundtrack	From The End of History.	

== Notes ==
- A Slow Wall was released under the pseudonym "Bilbo."
- B Campaign Button was a tour-only EP released at Regan's 2005–2006 live performances.
- C Home Recording Sampler did not receive a retail release.
- D "Line Written in Winter" was a promotional release only.
