= Be Good or Be Gone =

Single by Fionn Regan

from the album The End of History
- B-side: "Ice Cap Lullaby"/"Getting Better"
- Released: 5 February 2006
- Recorded: 2005–2006
- Genre: Folk
- Length: 3:20
- Label: Bella Union
- Songwriter(s): Fionn Regan
- Producer(s): Fionn Regan

Fionn Regan singles chronology
"Little Miss Drunk" (2002)	"Be Good or Be Gone" (2006)	"Protection Racket" (2009)

"Be Good or Be Gone" is a song by the Irish folk musician Fionn Regan. It is the opening track and lead single from Regan's debut studio album, The End of History, and was released on 5 February 2006 on Bella Union.

== Track listings ==
UK 7" single (BELLAV 133)
No.	Title	Length
1.	"Be Good or Be Gone"	3:20
2.	"Ice Cap Lullaby"	1:23

UK CD single (BELLACD 155)
No.	Title	Writer(s)	Length
1.	"Be Good or Be Gone"		3:20
2.	"Getting Better"	Lennon–McCartney	3:01
3.	"Be Good or Be Gone" (video)		3:21

Irish CD single (HEFFACDS 003)
No.	Title	Length
1.	"Be Good or Be Gone"	3:20
2.	"Be Good or Be Gone" (live)	4:06
3.	"Ice Cap Lullaby"	1:23
4.	"Be Good or Be Gone" (video)	3:21

US CD single
No.	Title	Length
1.	"Be Good or Be Gone"	3:20

== Personnel ==
All personnel credits adapted from The End of History's liner notes.

Performer

- Fionn Regan – vocals, guitar, backing vocals, producer, mixing

Technical personnel

- Karl Odlum – engineer
- Simon Raymonde – mixing
- Finn Eiles – mixing engineer
- Denis Blackham – mastering
