= Live with Royal Northern Sinfonia =

Live With Royal Northern Sinfonia

Live album by Lanterns on the Lake
- Released: 25 November 2017 (UK)
- Genre: Indie
- Length: 54:11
- Label: Bella Union
- Producer: Paul Gregory

Lanterns on the Lake chronology
| Beings (2015) | Live With Royal Northern Sinfonia (2017) | Spook the Herd (2020) |

Live With Royal Northern Sinfonia is a 2017 live album featuring Lanterns on the Lake with the Royal Northern Sinfonia orchestra.

In February 2016, Lanterns on the Lake performed a one-off show at Sage Gateshead with the Royal Northern Sinfonia in a unique revision of their catalogue. Fiona Brice, wrote the arrangements.

The show was recorded and released via Bella Union on vinyl in 2017, with a digital release prior to this.
