= Drowning Craze =

British post-punk band

- Origin: London
- Genre: Post-punk
- Years active: 1980–1982
- Label: Situation Two
- Past members: Simon Raymonde; Simon Godfrey; Paul Cummins; Angela Jaeger; Frankie Nardiello

Drowning Craze was a London-based post-punk band active from 1980 to 1982.

== History ==
Forming in 1980, Drowning Craze began as an instrumental trio of bassist Simon Raymonde, guitarist Paul Cummins and drummer Simon Godfrey. Their influences included Wild Swans, Delta 5, the Pop Group, A Certain Ratio, 23 Skidoo, the Fire Engines and Public Image Ltd.

Situation Two founder Peter Kent heard the group's demos and put them in contact with Angela Jaeger, a New York-born vocalist who had moved to London to study voice and musical theatre. One week later, this line-up recorded the band's debut 7" single, "Storage Case", produced by Raymonde's brother, Nick Raymonde. Released by Situation Two on 24 June 1981, It made "Single of the Week" in British music magazines NME and Melody Maker. Jaeger played only one gig with the band before leaving.

Kent found them a replacement, Chicago-born Frankie Nardiello, who joined in time to sing on the band's second single, "Trance", released on 17 October 1981. In January 1982, Drowning Craze recorded a Peel Session, airing on 13 January and featuring the songs "In the Heat", "Keep Fit", "Out of Order" and "He Was". Drowning Craze performed gigs in support of artists including the Birthday Party, Bauhaus, Modern English and Divine.

The group disbanded after a third and final single, "Heat", released 3 March 1982. Raymonde later said, "Artistic differences and the guitarist qualifying as an accountant led to the band's demise, probably a blessing in disguise".

In 2018, Raymonde's label, Bella Union, announced the release of a Drowning Craze compilation album, Singles '81-'82, collecting all three singles as well as the Peel Session tracks.

== Later projects ==
Raymonde joined Cocteau Twins before forming the Bella Union label, and later, Snowbird.

Jaeger went on to sing backup with Billy MacKenzie, the Monochrome Set and Pigbag.

Adopting the name Groovie Mann, Nardiello is the lead singer of Chicago-based industrial rock band My Life with the Thrill Kill Kult. Simon Godfrey played drums with Passion Puppets and now writes and records as Archshark King

== Discography ==
=== Singles ===
- "Storage Case" b/w "Damp Bones" 7" (1981, Situation Two)
- "Trance" b/w "I Love the Fjords" 7" (1981, Situation Two)
- "Heat" b/w "Replays" 7" (1982, Situation Two)

=== Compilation albums ===
- Singles '81-'82 (2018, Bella Union)
