= Heaven or Las Vegas =

Studio album by Cocteau Twins
- Released: 17 September 1990
- Studio: September Sound (London)
- Genres: Dream pop; ambient pop
- Length: 37:42
- Label: 4AD
- Producer: Cocteau Twins

Cocteau Twins chronology
Blue Bell Knoll (1988)	Heaven or Las Vegas (1990)	Four-Calendar Café (1993)

Singles from Heaven or Las Vegas
- 1. "Iceblink Luck" Released: 27 August 1990

Heaven or Las Vegas is the sixth studio album by the Scottish band Cocteau Twins, released on 17 September 1990 by 4AD. Recorded at September Sound in Twickenham, it followed the band's 1988 album Blue Bell Knoll and was their second release to be issued in the United States through a distribution deal with Capitol Records.

The album blends dream pop and ambient pop with elements of psychedelia, experimental, and electronic textures. The composition of Heaven or Las Vegas reflects a shift toward more accessible and structured songwriting, balancing the band's established ethereal textures with clearer melodies and rhythms. Built around Robin Guthrie's guitar work, Simon Raymonde's bass lines, and programmed percussion, the songs incorporated brighter harmonies and major–minor chord progressions that conveyed both intimacy and emotional depth. Elizabeth Fraser's vocals, while still marked by glossolalia and unconventional phrasing, were delivered with greater clarity than on previous albums, a change often linked to her personal circumstances at the time.

Heaven or Las Vegas has since been recognised as one of Cocteau Twins' most influential works and as a landmark in dream pop. It peaked at number seven on the UK Albums Chart and number 99 on the US Billboard 200, becoming the band's most commercially successful release. It eventually sold 235,000 copies by 1996. The album was included in the book 1001 Albums You Must Hear Before You Die, and was voted number 218 in the third edition of Colin Larkin's All Time Top 1000 Albums. In 2020, Rolling Stone listed it at No. 245 in its list of the 500 Greatest Albums of All Time.

== Background ==
Cocteau Twins released their fifth album, Blue Bell Knoll, in 1988. Despite signing a major label deal with Capitol Records, they nevertheless shot a video for the US promo-only single "Carolyn's Fingers". The band hired a manager for the first time as they had run into tax trouble previously. Ivo Watts-Russell, 4AD president at the time, reportedly "didn't care" for their new manager and his relationship with the band began to sour.

The band took on new familial responsibilities as bassist Simon Raymonde married his first wife, Karen, and vocalist Elizabeth Fraser was expecting her first child with guitarist and co-founder Robin Guthrie. The latter's cocaine habit previously "escalated" during the recording process for Blue Bell Knoll; Fraser and Raymonde believed that the new baby would prove a diversion from Guthrie's dependency and allow the pair to "play happy families". Their wishes did not pan out, with Guthrie relying heavily on drugs as the band developed Heaven or Las Vegas, causing him to experience "deep" paranoia and mood swings. His relationship with Fraser grew increasingly strained as a result.

== Recording and production ==
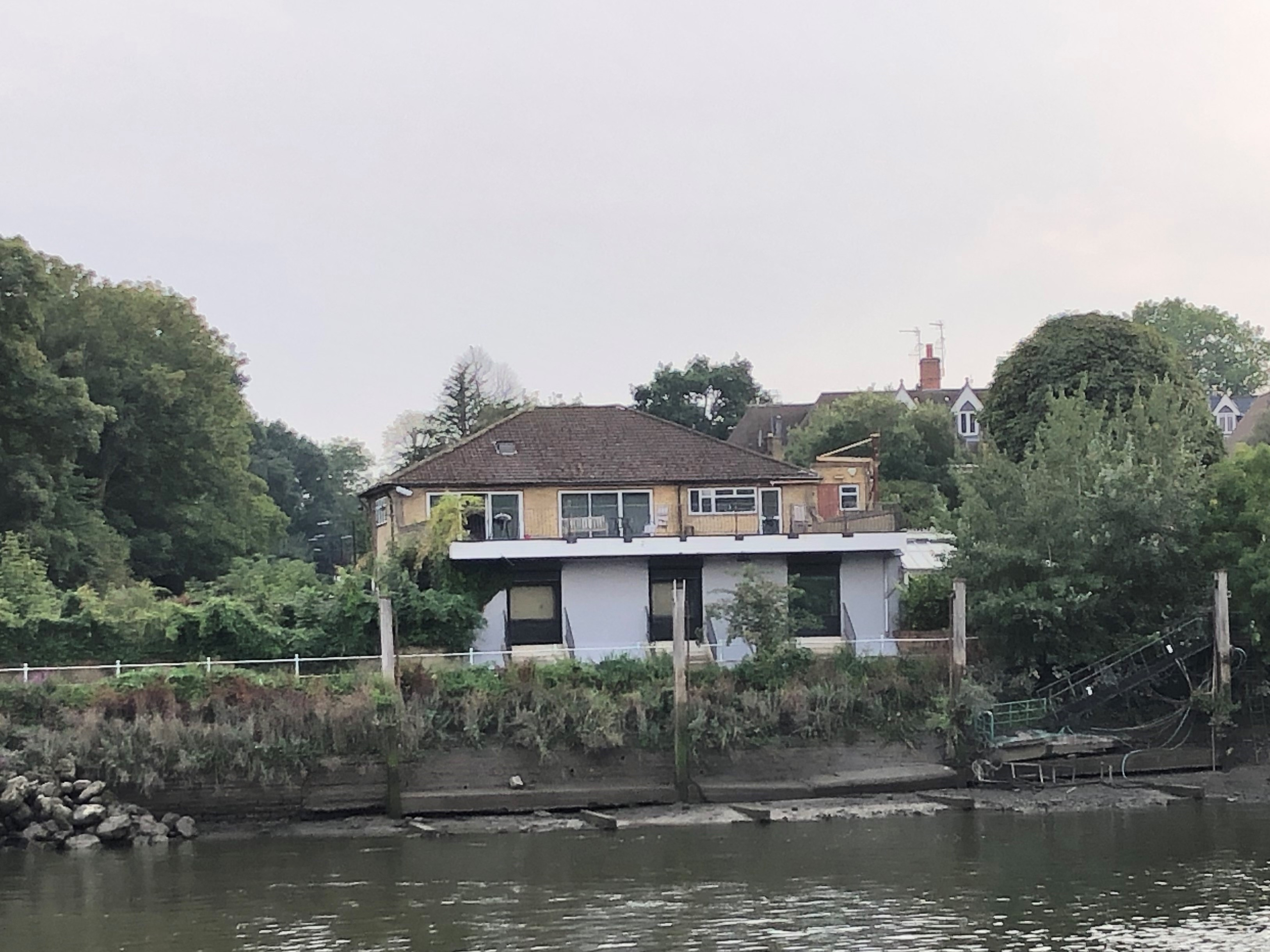
View of the former Eel Pie Studios building in 2020

The recording sessions took place at September Sound in Twickenham, London. The studio was a portion of Eel Pie Studios, which was owned by Pete Townshend. According to Gary Walker, the environment was "overshadowed by the transience of death, birth and heartbreak". In September 1989, Fraser and Guthrie's child, Lucy Belle was born; Heaven or Las Vegas was released on her first birthday. Of her pregnancy, Fraser said that she gained clarity about what mattered to her most: "Suddenly I had confidence which I'd never ever had in my life, which I consequently lost after I had the baby, because it's such a frightening experience you lose it again and you have to start over again. But it does change you". Raymonde's father, Ivor, died shortly after Lucy Belle's birth, as the band were in the middle of recording. His passing cast what Raymonde called a "dark cloud" over the sessions. He recounted: "I was only 27, I was still quite young and he was a very influential guy for me so that was a big blow but, looking back on it, having a major life event happening probably helped the record have that edge to it".

As with each of the group's recording sessions, production began with Guthrie's drum programming. Guthrie and Raymonde composed the music before Fraser recorded her vocals. Raymonde likened Guthrie's rhythms on the album to hip-hop beats; despite their music being far removed from it, he acknowledged that it came from a "dance-y" place. Many of the "mysterious" instrumental effects on Heaven or Las Vegas were achieved by accident, using guitars rather than "omnipresent" synthesisers. As a result of Guthrie's decreased time in the studio, Raymonde's playing was more notable and he became more involved in the recording process. Raymonde recounted that he would record Fraser's vocals alone for days at a time, during which he first "fully appreciated how amazing she was": "She'd come into the control room and say, 'What was that like?' and I'd scrape the tears away and say, 'That was alright, Liz'. She didn't get off on praise. If I said. 'That was fucking amazing', she'd say 'I thought it was shit'. I learnt not to be too effusive, which was difficult because I was so blown away with what I was hearing".

== Musical style ==
Music critics have described Heaven or Las Vegas as both dream pop and ambient pop recording. The album carries psychedelic, experimental and electronic textures. Heaven or Las Vegas displays musical evolution, with the music becoming more accessible, "warmer, and more inviting". During periods of heavy drug use, their music became more "ecstatic". They began incorporating syncopated, "danceable" rhythms and immersive synthesiser textures. Rob Morton described Guthrie's guitar work as "chiming", Raymonde's bass as "ominous" and "pulsing", and Fraser's vocals as "mesmerising", with her high notes characterised as "angelic". Paste's Max Freedman assessed that the band "all but introduced the concept of glossolalia to pop music, and you'd be hard-pressed to clearly make out more than a few passing phrases". Fraser's lyrics were described more as "unintelligible" or "marginally more intelligible", with Richard Jones saying that if "you've played Heaven or Las Vegas about 10,000 times you might be able to distinguish the tracks from one or another or even pick on a few of the lyrics". Despite most of Fraser's lyrics "[emerging] in alien tongues", which she sums up as "laziness" and "bad diction", she attributed the album's more identifiable words to Lucy Belle's influence.

There was salvation in [Fraser's vocals and lyrics] too, in terms of helping save her relationship with [Guthrie], the joy of bringing a baby into the world that they could love. It did give them a new lease of life, and it gave the album an energy and vibrancy. It was very easy to make the music.

=== Songwriting ===
The album's songwriting was also improved, with tracks blending major and minor chords to create a more tangible emotional depth than Blue Bell Knoll. Heaven or Las Vegas straddled the two themes. In a retrospective of 4AD by music journalist Martin Aston, he wrote that "writing songs about birth, and also death, gave the record a darker side that I hear in songs like 'Cherry-Coloured Funk' and 'Fotzepolitic'". Despite being in a "very good space musically" and describing the recording process as an "inspirational time", Raymonde said: "It was trying to mask all the other shit that was going on that we didn't want to stop and think about for too long". Aston he noted that Fraser named the album Heaven or Las Vegas as "a suggestion of truth versus artifice, of music versus commerce, or perhaps a gamble, one last throw of the dice". Many of the song titles were described as "vague" and "nonsensical as ever" by the Journal Tribune, such as "Iceblink Luck", "Fotzepolitic" and "Frou-Frou Foxes in Midsummer Fires".

The opening track, "Cherry-Coloured Funk", contains a dominant bass line, a minimalist three-chord hook, and a "melt-in-your-ear melody". "Pitch the Baby" has hip-hop elements and lyrics that reflect the joy of childbirth, along with many of the album's other songs that center on Fraser's newborn daughter, Lucy Belle. "Iceblink Luck" retained its lush, velvety texture in performance, with Elizabeth Fraser singing chiefly in her lower register. "Fifty-Fifty Clown" was built without the use of synthesisers, despite featuring textures that may resemble them. While experimenting with a newly acquired piece of rack-mounted effects gear, Raymonde plugged in his guitar to assist Guthrie in exploring its capabilities. Guthrie subsequently added additional guitar layers, and the band initially considered the instrumental version complete. However, once Elizabeth Fraser contributed her vocals, Raymonde described the result as "divine". According to Raymonde, the title track "Heaven or Las Vegas" featured Fraser's idiosyncratic vocal style, particularly her backing vocals, which he considered especially "underrated". The band was confident in the instrumental arrangement, but Fraser's vocal performance elevated the song during the recording process.

On "I Wear Your Ring", Fraser's vocals were likened to a "postmodern Karen Carpenter", as she departs from her characteristically indistinct enunciation and delivers the lyrics with unusual clarity. "Fotzepolitic" blended jangling folk-rock guitars with another warmly delivered Fraser vocal. "Wolf in the Breast" is described by Raymonde as one of his personal favourite tracks on the album. He recalls it as a deeply emotional piece that continues to move him, particularly due to the interplay between his bass lines and Guthrie's guitar work, and described the composition as one that "writes itself". Fraser's voice conveys a sense of vulnerability in "Road, River and Rail", occasionally cracking with emotion. Raymonde wrote "Frou-Frou Foxes in Midsummer Fires" the day after his father's death. The track was built around Raymonde's piano part and Guthrie's drum programming, to which Guthrie later added layered guitar textures and bass, as Raymonde noted he was emotionally exhausted. Raymonde described the track as difficult to revisit due to its emotional context but expressed pride in the result.

== Release and artwork ==
The band wanted a visual representation that would capture "the ethereal", according to Guthrie. Paul West, of the design studio Form, previously worked with Cocteau Twins on the cover for Blue Bell Knoll. West recruited photographer Andy Rumball, and the pair experimented with various materials to generate a "textural and otherworldly" effect. The result was a long exposure of Christmas tree lights against a colour backdrop, with its typography produced by hand on an acetate overlay. Much of the original artwork was later destroyed in a flood.

The album was released on 17 September 1990 by 4AD in the United Kingdom, and in conjunction with Capitol Records in the United States. The song "Iceblink Luck" was released as a single on 27 August 1990. 4AD later reacquired American distribution rights for much of its back catalogue, resulting in a 2003 reissue solely on 4AD, which was remastered by Guthrie. A vinyl edition of the reissue was released in July 2014, which was re-pressed on 180g in 2020, remastered from high definition audio files.

== Critical reception ==
Professional ratings
Review scores
Source	Rating
AllMusic	5/5 stars
Entertainment Weekly	B−
NME	8/10
Pitchfork	10/10
Q	4/5 stars
Record Mirror	4 1/2/5
The Rolling Stone Album Guide	4/5 stars
Select	4/5
Sounds	4/5 stars
Vox	10/10

The album has received critical acclaim. From contemporary reviews, Andrew Perry of Select who gave the album a score four out of five wrote that, Heaven or Las Vegas is the Cocteau Twins in their "usual, spectacular and enigmatic context". Vox's Roger Morton contrasted the band with contemporaries who relied on drugs and retro studio techniques, suggesting that the Cocteau Twins reached a "blissed-out" state with unusual effortlessness. The Journal Tribune gave it four and a half out of five stars and said that, taken in proper perspective, it "can transport its listeners to a land of airy daydreams".

Barbara Ellen from NME rated it an 8 out of 10 and, despite not being a "fan" of Cocteau Twins, she called the album "a beautiful sounding album". Martin Aston, who worked for Q at the time gave it four out of five stars, enthusing that "Heaven or Las Vegas is their finest hour yet" and suggesting that its songs eclipsed even Kate Bush, whom he identified as their closest point of comparison. The album subsequently featured in the magazine's "best of the year" roundup: "It's wonderfully comforting how the Cocteaus continue on their inimitable course, blissfully regardless of what's going on in the world outside their surreal reality".

Stephen Deusner from Pitchfork described Heaven or Las Vegas as the Cocteau Twins' "best album", noting how it "explodes in Technicolor from the first melty guitar chords" and sustains a palette of sounds where "every note sounds like a new and richer shade of indigo and scarlet and violet than the previous one". It was considered the band's strongest work since Treasure by AllMusic reviewer Ned Raggett, who called it "simply fantastic" and successful in creating "more accessibility". Maximilian Fritz, writing for laut.de, also gave the album five stars and described the album as a "particularly significant work" in the Cocteau Twins discography, noting that the band "suddenly sounded clearer and more concrete than ever, without losing their spiritual, ethereal qualities".

=== Legacy ===
Heaven or Las Vegas peaked at number seven on the UK Albums Chart and number 99 on the US Billboard 200, becoming the Cocteau Twins' most commercially successful release. By 1996, the album had sold approximately 235,000 copies, according to Billboard. The album was the focus of a BBC Scotland programme, Classic Scottish Albums in 2007. The album was voted "Album of the Week" in 13 October 1990 by German radio broadcaster Südwestrundfunk, and in France by radio broadcasters RMC and Radio Nantes. According to an article in Pitchfork, the song "Love... Thy Will Be Done" by Martika contains a sample of "Fifty-Fifty Clown". Heaven or Las Vegas was listed as the 90th best album of the 1990s by Pitchfork, who complimented Fraser's more direct vocals and the album's complex songwriting. It was also included in the 2008 edition of 1001 Albums You Must Hear Before You Die, and in The Guardian's online edition of a similar list.

The album was voted number 218 in the third edition of Colin Larkin's All Time Top 1000 Albums. The Observer listed the album as the 97th-greatest British album ever made. Retrospectively, NME named Heaven or Las Vegas the 28th best album of 1990 in a 2016 list. In 2017, NPR listed Heaven or Las Vegas 138th of the 150 Greatest Albums Made By Women. In 2018, Pitchfork ranked it first on its list of the 30 best dream pop albums. In 2020, Rolling Stone listed the album 245th on its list of the 500 Greatest Albums of All Time. In 2020, Paste named the album as the best album of 1990. Staff writer Max Freedman said: "Atop guitars that gleam like diamonds, pianos that drip like water and a hefty whisper of a drum shuffle, Fraser's voice resounds so beautifully, it's literally stunning. At one point she sings, 'It must be why I'm thinking of Las Vegas,' but 1990's best album is entirely heaven".

In 2024, Paste ranked Heaven or Las Vegas number 43 on its list of the 300 greatest albums of all time, and number one on their Top 25 Dream Pop Albums of All Time list. Heaven or Las Vegas has been described by The Guardian as "the band's most accessible and immediate – one could almost say radio-friendly – album to date". Their reasons ranged from Guthrie's "cut back layers of guitar and reverb", "Fraser's singing being more comprehensible", and "both Raymonde's bass work and the ever-present drum machine". Album tracks "Cherry-Coloured Funk" and "Iceblink Luck" were acknowledged as becoming immediate favourites amongst fans of the band following the album's release.

=== Recognition ===
Year	Organisation	Award	Recipient	Result
2022	Scottish Album of the Year Award	Modern Scottish Classic Award	Heaven or Las Vegas	Won

== Track listing ==
All tracks are written by and produced by Cocteau Twins.

Heaven or Las Vegas track listing
No.	Title	Length
1.	"Cherry-Coloured Funk"	3:12
2.	"Pitch the Baby"	3:14
3.	"Iceblink Luck"	3:18
4.	"Fifty-Fifty Clown"	3:10
5.	"Heaven or Las Vegas"	4:58
6.	"I Wear Your Ring"	3:29
7.	"Fotzepolitic"	3:30
8.	"Wolf in the Breast"	3:31
9.	"Road, River and Rail"	3:21
10.	"Frou-Frou Foxes in Midsummer Fires"	5:37
Total length:		37:42

Notes

- On the 2014 remastered edition, "Fifty-Fifty Clown" is 3:17 in length and "Frou-Frou Foxes in Midsummer Fires" is 5:48 in length.

== Personnel ==
Credits are adapted from the album's liner notes.

- Elizabeth Fraser – vocals
- Robin Guthrie – guitar, drum machine
- Simon Raymonde – bass guitar, keyboards
- Andy Rumball – photography
- Paul West – sleeve design

== Charts ==
Chart performance for Heaven or Las Vegas
Chart (1990)	Peak position
Australian Albums (ARIA)	130
European Albums (European Top 100 Albums)	57
UK Albums (Official Charts)	7
US Billboard 200	99

2025 chart performance for Heaven or Las Vegas
Chart (2025)	Peak position
Australian Vinyl Albums (ARIA)	3

== Certifications ==
Certifications for Heaven or Las Vegas
Region	Certification	Certified units/sales
United Kingdom (BPI)	Gold	235,000
