= Gracious Tide, Take Me Home =

Studio album by Lanterns on the Lake
- Released: 19 September 2011(UK); 19 September 2011 (US)
- Genre: Rock
- Length: 48:07
- Label: Bella Union
- Producer: Paul Gregory

Lanterns on the Lake chronology
Misfortunes and Minor Victories EP (2009)	Gracious Tide, Take Me Home (2011)	Until the Colours Run (2013)

Professional ratings
Aggregate scores
Source	Rating
Metacritic	74/100
Review scores
Source	Rating
Allmusic	4/5 stars
Drowned in Sound	8/10
MusicOMH	4/5 stars

Gracious Tide, Take Me Home is the debut studio album by British band Lanterns on the Lake. It was released in the UK on 19 September 2011 under Bella Union.

== Track list ==
No.	Title	Length
1.	"Lungs Quicken"	5:53
2.	"If I've Been Unkind"	4:48
3.	"Keep On Trying"	5:04
4.	"Ships In The Rain"	2:04
5.	"A Kingdom"	4:14
6.	"The Places We Call Home"	6:15
7.	"Blanket Of Leaves"	3:28
8.	"Tricks"	6:35
9.	"You're Almost There"	3:10
10.	"I Love You, Sleepyhead"	5:41
11.	"Not Going Back To The Harbour"	1:13
