= Brian Murphy (musician) =

Musician, engineer, and songwriter

Brian Murphy is a musician, engineer, and songwriter who has worked with artists such as Hal and Fionn Regan. He was Fionn Regan's touring and recording drummer from 2006 to 2009. He recorded Fionn's second album The Shadow of an Empire as well as featuring on drums. He also played bass guitar on the single "Protection Racket".
