= Cherry-Coloured Funk =

Song by Cocteau Twins

from the album Heaven or Las Vegas
- Released: 17 September 1990
- Recorded: 1990
- Studio: September Sound, London
- Genre: Dream pop, ethereal wave
- Length: 3:12
- Label: 4AD
- Songwriters: Elizabeth Fraser, Robin Guthrie, Simon Raymonde
- Producer: Robin Guthrie

"Cherry-Coloured Funk" is a song by the Scottish alternative rock band Cocteau Twins. It is the opening track on their sixth studio album, Heaven or Las Vegas (1990), released by 4AD.

== Background and composition ==
"Cherry-Coloured Funk" was written and recorded by band members Elizabeth Fraser, Robin Guthrie, and Simon Raymonde during sessions for Heaven or Las Vegas at September Sound studios in London. The track established the album's musical direction, combining melodic accessibility with the atmospheric and ethereal sound for which the group had become known. Pitchfork called out the song's "first melty guitar chords" as setting up the listener to enjoy the bright imagery of Heaven or Las Vegas.

== Reception and legacy ==
The song received considerable retrospective critical recognition. In a review of the album's 2014 reissue, Pitchfork highlighted its opening guitar chords, describing the album as beginning with an explosion of colour and identifying "Cherry-Coloured Funk" as an immediate introduction to its richly layered sound. The review particularly praised the interplay between the group's instrumental arrangements and Fraser's vocals, noting the emotional significance of her lyrics.

The song was subsequently reworked by electronic musician Mark Clifford of Seefeel and included on the Cocteau Twins' 1995 EP Otherness. The reworked version, credited as having been "recycled" by Clifford, demonstrated the continuing adaptability of the original composition and brought its atmospheric sound into a more electronic musical context. "Cherry-Coloured Funk" has also featured in film and television, contributing to its continued recognition beyond the band's original audience. Its soundtrack appearances include the 2008 romantic comedy film 27 Dresses, the 2017 television thriller Rellik, and the 2019 film Endings, Beginnings.

In September 2022, Pitchfork ranked "Cherry-Coloured Funk" at number 188 in its list of The 250 Best Songs of the 1990s. The accompanying retrospective described the song as an expression of the contrasting experiences of hope, heartbreak and emotional uncertainty, drawing attention to Fraser's progression from a lower vocal register to an expressive falsetto. The publication also recognised the track as the opening song of Heaven or Las Vegas, which it described as a defining album of the period.

== Certifications ==
Region	Certification	Certified units/sales
Australia (ARIA)	Gold	35,000^{‡}
United Kingdom (BPI)	Silver	200,000^{‡}
United States (RIAA)	Gold	500,000^{‡}
^{‡} Sales+streaming figures based on certification alone.

== Personnel ==
- Elizabeth Fraser – vocals
- Robin Guthrie – guitars, production
- Simon Raymonde – bass guitar
