= Beings (album) =

Studio album by Lanterns on the Lake
- Released: 25 November 2015 (UK)
- Recorded: Newcastle Upon Tyne
- Genre: Indie rock
- Length: 41:06
- Label: Bella Union
- Producer: Paul Gregory

Lanterns on the Lake chronology
| Until The Colours Run (2013) | Beings (2015) | Live With Royal Northern Sinfonia (2017) |

Professional ratings
Aggregate scores
| Source | Rating |
|---|---|
| Metacritic | 79/100 |
Review scores
| Source | Rating |
| AllMusic | 4/5 stars |
| DIY | 4/5 stars |
| Drowned in Sound | 8/10 |
| The Line of Best Fit | 8.5/10 |
| MusicOMH | 4/5 stars |
| The Skinny | 4/5 stars |
| Under the Radar | 8/10 |

Beings is the third studio album by British indie rock band Lanterns on the Lake. It was released in November 2015, under Bella Union.

The album was met with praise from critics upon its release, earning a score of 79/100 on review aggregate site Metacritic, indicating "generally favorable reviews". Music critic Marcy Donelson, writing for AllMusic, awarded the album a score of 4 out of 5 stars and praised opener "Of Dust and Matter" as sounding reminiscent of Siouxsie Sioux, concluding that the album "dwells in a cloudy blend of dreams and creeping nightmares, unsettling yet captivating." In a review written by Joe Goggins, DIY magazine likewise awarded the album 4 stars, singling out the title track as a "standout" and commented that the group "is virtually without equal."

The song "Through The Cellar Door" was used for the soundtrack of the Square Enix game Life Is Strange: Before the Storm.

== Track listing ==
All tracks are written by Lanterns on the Lake.

| No. | Title | Length |
|---|---|---|
| 1. | "Of Dust And Matter" | 5:00 |
| 2. | "I'll Stall Them" | 4:07 |
| 3. | "Faultlines" | 5:14 |
| 4. | "The Crawl" | 4:09 |
| 5. | "Send Me Home" | 2:26 |
| 6. | "Through The Cellar Door" | 2:56 |
| 7. | "Beings" | 6:26 |
| 8. | "Stepping Down" | 4:23 |
| 9. | "Stuck For An Outline" | 4:35 |
| 10. | "Inkblot" | 1:52 |

== Personnel ==
- Hazel Wilde - Vocals, Piano, Guitar
- Paul Gregory - Guitar, Engineering, Mixing, Production
- Angela Chan - Violin, Cello
- Bob Allan - Bass
- Oliver Ketteringham - Drums

Additional personnel

- Mandy Parnell - Mastering
- K Craig - Artwork
- Simon Dennis and Tim Hurst - Brass on 'I'll Stall Them'
