= Until the Colours Run =

Studio album by Lanterns on the Lake
- Released: 7 October 2013 (UK); 14 January 2014 (US)
- Genre: Rock
- Length: 42:22
- Label: Bella Union
- Producer: Paul Gregory

Lanterns on the Lake chronology
Gracious Tide, Take Me Home (2011)	Until the Colours Run (2013)	Beings (2015)

Professional ratings
Aggregate scores
Source	Rating
Metacritic	78/100
Review scores
Source	Rating
Allmusic	4/5 stars
Exclaim!	8/10
Drowned in Sound	8/10
MusicOMH	4/5 stars
PopMatters	7/10

Until the Colours Run is the second studio album by the British rock band Lanterns on the Lake. It was released in the UK in October 2013 and in the US in January 2014 under Bella Union. The album was met to critical acclaim, Drowned In Sound declared it "one of the best records of the young decade".

== Track listing ==
Written and arranged by Lanterns On The Lake, lyrics by Hazel Wilde

No.	Title	Length
1.	"Elodie"	4:25
2.	"The Buffalo Days"	4:08
3.	"The Ghost That Sleeps in Me"	4:37
4.	"Until the Colours Run"	5:29
5.	"Green & Gold"	5:14
6.	"You Soon Learn"	5:04
7.	"Picture Show"	4:40
8.	"Another Tale from Another English Town"	5:16
9.	"Our Cool Decay"	3:29

== Personnel ==
- Hazel Wilde - Vocals, Piano, Guitar, Artwork
- Paul Gregory - Guitar, Engineering, Mixing, Production
- Sarah Kemp - Violin, Accordion, Cello
- Andy Scrogham - Bass, harmonium
- Oliver Ketteringham - Drums, harmonium

Additional personnel

- Noel Summerville - Mastering
- Katherine Medway - French Horn on "The Ghost That Sleeps In Me"
