= The Spangle Maker =

EP by Cocteau Twins
- Released: 2 April 1984
- Studio: Palladium Studios, Edinburgh and Rooster Studios, London
- Genre: Gothic rock; ethereal wave
- Length: 18:30
- Label: 4AD
- Producer: Cocteau Twins

Cocteau Twins chronology
Sunburst and Snowblind (1983)	The Spangle Maker (1984)	Treasure (1984)

Professional ratings
Review scores
Source	Rating
AllMusic	3/5 stars
Spin Alternative Record Guide	7/10

The Spangle Maker is an EP by Scottish band Cocteau Twins, released on 4AD in April 1984. It was the first recording to be issued after bassist Simon Raymonde joined the band. The 1984 release features a longer version of "Pearly-Dewdrops' Drops", and two b-sides: "The Spangle Maker" and "Pepper-Tree", while the 1991 CD release adds the shorter 7-inch version of "Pearly-Dewdrops' Drops". All three songs appeared in the band's live set.

"The Spangle Maker" and "Pepper-Tree" were recorded at the Palladium Studios in Edinburgh and mixed at Rooster in West London. "Pearly-Dewdrops' Drops" was recorded at Rooster.

The sleeve notes credit the cover image to photographer Gertrude Käsebier.

== Reception ==
Ned Raggett of The Guardian wrote that "The Spangle Maker" had "a minimal, tense arrangement that suddenly exploded into a concluding, crashing swoon" and described "Pepper-Tree" as one of the band's "gentlest tracks to date, a serene and exquisite lope that could only be described as sunlight through curtains." He also remarked that "Pearly-Dewdrops' Drops" sounded like an anthem, featuring "Guthrie’s trademark sound of heavily reverbed guitars that might as well have been bells, that might as well have been keyboards," a slow pace, strong beats and Fraser's "soaring" vocals.

== Track listing ==
All songs written by Elizabeth Fraser, Robin Guthrie and Simon Raymonde.

=== 12": 4AD / BAD 405 (UK) ===
1. "The Spangle Maker" – 4:40
2. "Pearly-Dewdrops' Drops" – 5:13
3. "Pepper-Tree" – 3:57

=== 7": 4AD / AD 405 (UK) ===
1. "Pearly-Dewdrops' Drops" (7-inch version) – 4:11
2. "Pepper-Tree" – 3:57

=== CD: 4AD / BAD 405 CD (UK) ===
1. "The Spangle Maker" – 4:40
2. "Pearly-Dewdrops' Drops" (12-inch version) – 5:13
3. "Pepper-Tree" – 3:57
4. "Pearly-Dewdrops' Drops" (7-inch version) – 4:11
- CD version released in 1991

== Personnel ==
- Elizabeth Fraser – vocals
- Robin Guthrie – guitar
- Simon Raymonde – bass guitar

=== Additional personnel ===
- John Madden – recording engineer ("Pearly-Dewdrops' Drops"), mixing engineer
- Jon Turner – recording engineer ("The Spangle Maker", "Pepper-Tree")
