= Deià =

- Municipality
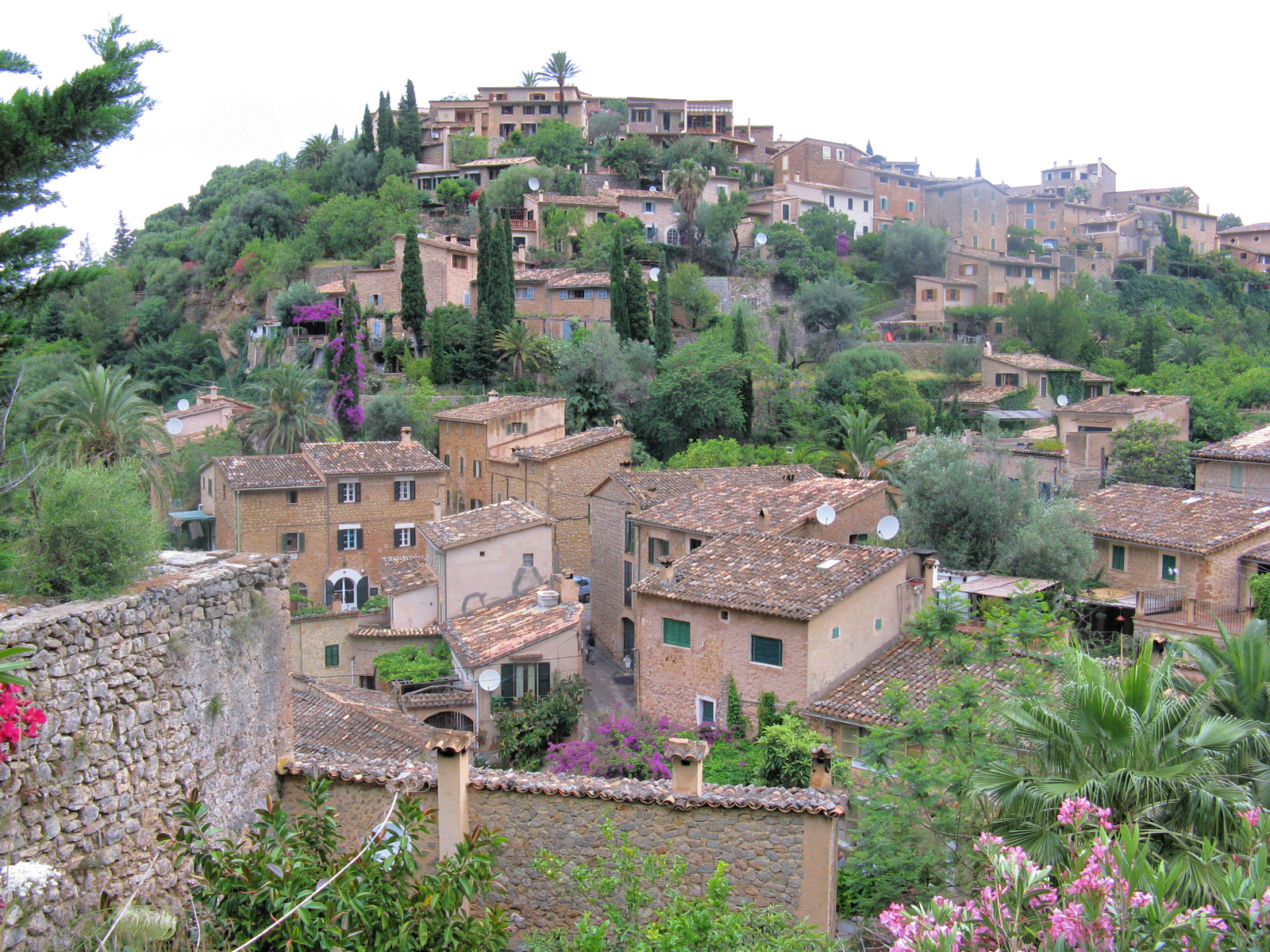
- Part of Deià

- Coat of arms

- Location within Mallorca

- Location in Majorca Deià (Balearic Islands) Deià (Spain)
- Coordinates: 39°45′N 2°39′E
- Country: Spain
- Autonomous community: Balearic Islands
- Province: Balearic Islands
- Comarca: Serra de Tramuntana

Population (2025-01-01)
  - Total: 741
- Time zone: UTC+1 (CET)
  - Summer (DST): UTC+2 (CEST)

Deià (Balearic Catalan: [dəˈja]) is a municipality and small coastal village in the Serra de Tramuntana, which forms the northern ridge of the Spanish island of Mallorca. It is located about 16 kilometres (10 mi) north of Valldemossa, and it is known for its literary and musical residents. Its idyllic landscape, orange and olive groves on cliffs overlooking the Mediterranean, served as a draw for German, English, and American expatriates after the First World War.

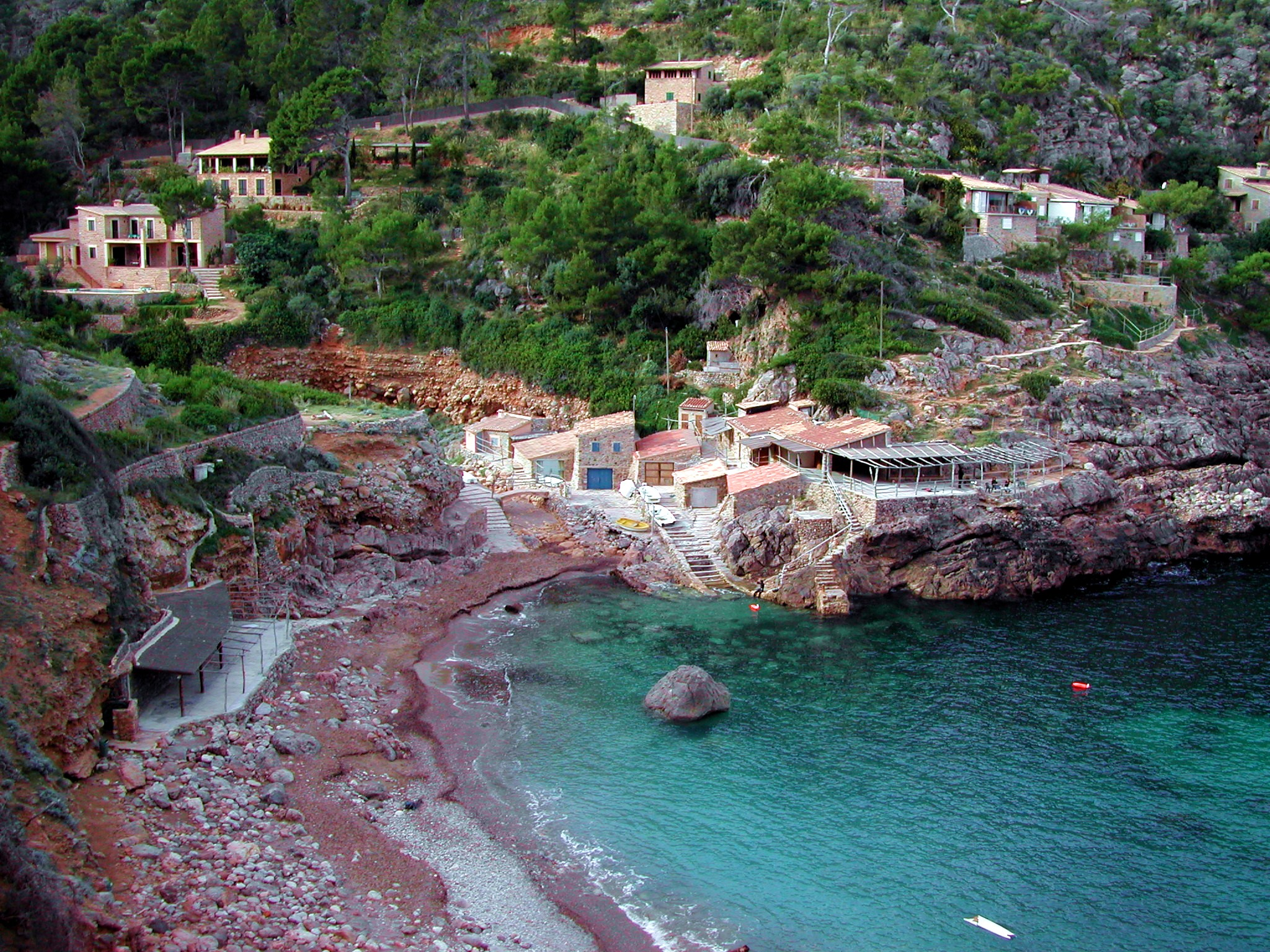
Deià Cove

The English poet, novelist, and scholar Robert Graves was one of the first foreigners to settle in the village, where he collaborated with Laura Riding in setting up the Seizin Press. Graves returned after the war and remained in Deià until his death. He used the town as the setting for many of his stories, including the historical novel Hercules my Shipmate. His house is now a museum.

Following Graves' lead, an artistic community of painters, photographers, writers, musicians, and "LSD entrepreneurs") formed in Deià and thrived from the 1950s to the 1980s, attracted by the village's natural beauty, rustic simplicity, and affordability when "a cognac was 5 pesetas and a three-course meal 40 pesetas (less than one US dollar at the time)." Literary critic Bruce King devotes a chapter of his memoirs describing this scene and its denizens.

Anaïs Nin visited the village in the 1920s, and wrote a short story set on the village's beach. The Spanish writer, Carme Riera, recently wrote a short story about Nin. The town is also the unnamed setting of the Uruguayan novelist Cristina Peri Rossi's The Ship of Fools (La nave de los locos). The Nicaraguan poet and novelist, Claribel Alegría, lived in Deià. Anja Rubik married fellow model Sasha Knezevic in this village in July 2011.

In recent decades, the stars of literature have been eclipsed by the stars of rock and roll. The Virgin Records mogul Richard Branson has a luxury residence in the town, and his label's stars have often visited the village and sometimes jammed at the local bar, Sa Fonda. Deià was home to several Canterbury-scene musicians over the years, including Kevin Ayers, Robert Wyatt, and Daevid Allen. Mick Jagger, guitarist Mark Knopfler, and Mike Oldfield played there often in the late 1980s, as did Caroline Corr. Much of Fionn Regan's third studio album, 100 Acres of Sycamore was inspired by his time spent in Deià.

== See also ==
- List of municipalities in Balearic Islands
