= Moon (Snowbird album) =

Studio album by Snowbird
- Released: January 28, 2014
- Genre: Alternative, dream pop
- Length: 1:38:15
- Label: Bella Union
- Producer: Simon Raymonde, Iggy B

Singles from Moon
- 1. "Porcelain" Released: November 11, 2013

Professional ratings
Aggregate scores
Source	Rating
Metacritic	69/100
Review scores
Source	Rating
AllMusic	4/5 stars
Clash Magazine	8/10
MusicOMH	4/5 stars
No Ripcord	7/10
Drowned in Sound	7/10

Moon is the debut studio album by American/British duo Snowbird. It was released in January 2014 by Bella Union. The album also contains a bonus second disc, titled Luna, consisting of remixes by RxGibbs.

== Track listing ==
Disc One (Moon)
No.	Title	Length
1.	"I Heard the Owl Call My Name"	4:13
2.	"All Wishes Are Ghosts"	5:12
3.	"Charming Birds from Trees"	4:10
4.	"Where Foxes Hide"	4:09
5.	"Amelia"	3:09
6.	"Bears on My Trail"	4:11
7.	"Porcelain"	4:04
8.	"Come to the Woods"	3:41
9.	"We Carry White Mice"	3:24
10.	"In Lovely"	4:00
11.	"Heart of the Woods"	4:24

Disc Two (Luna)
No.	Title	Length
1.	"I Heard the Owl Call My Name" (RxGibbs Remix)	5:22
2.	"All Wishes Are Ghosts" (RxGibbs Remix)	5:13
3.	"Charming Birds from Trees" (RxGibbs Remix)	5:18
4.	"Where Foxes Hide" (RxGibbs Remix)	3:46
5.	"Amelia" (RxGibbs Remix)	6:10
6.	"Bears on My Trail" (RxGibbs Remix)	4:39
7.	"Porcelain" (RxGibbs Remix)	5:30
8.	"Come to the Woods" (RxGibbs Remix)	3:32
9.	"We Carry White Mice" (RxGibbs Remix)	4:51
10.	"In Lovely" (RxGibbs Remix)	3:28
11.	"Heart of the Woods" (RxGibbs Remix)	5:49

== Personnel ==
Personnel adapted from Moon liner notes.

Snowbird

- Stephanie Dosen – vocals
- Simon Raymonde – piano, electric guitar, acoustic guitar, bass guitar, vibraphone, drums

Additional musicians

- Paul Gregory – guitar (tracks 1, 4, 7, 8, and 11)
- Will Vaughan – orchestration, strings, and harp (track 2), flute (tracks 2 and 7), double bass (track 7)
- Eric Pulido – acoustic guitar (track 6)
- Mckenzie Smith – drums (track 6)
- Jonathan Wilson – guitar (track 4)
- Ol Ketteringham – drums (track 4)
- Steve Honest – pedal steel guitar (track 3)
- Phil Selway – drums (tracks 2 and 8)
- Ed O'Brien – guitar (tracks 5 and 10)
