= Stephanie Dosen =

American singer-songwriter (born 1973)

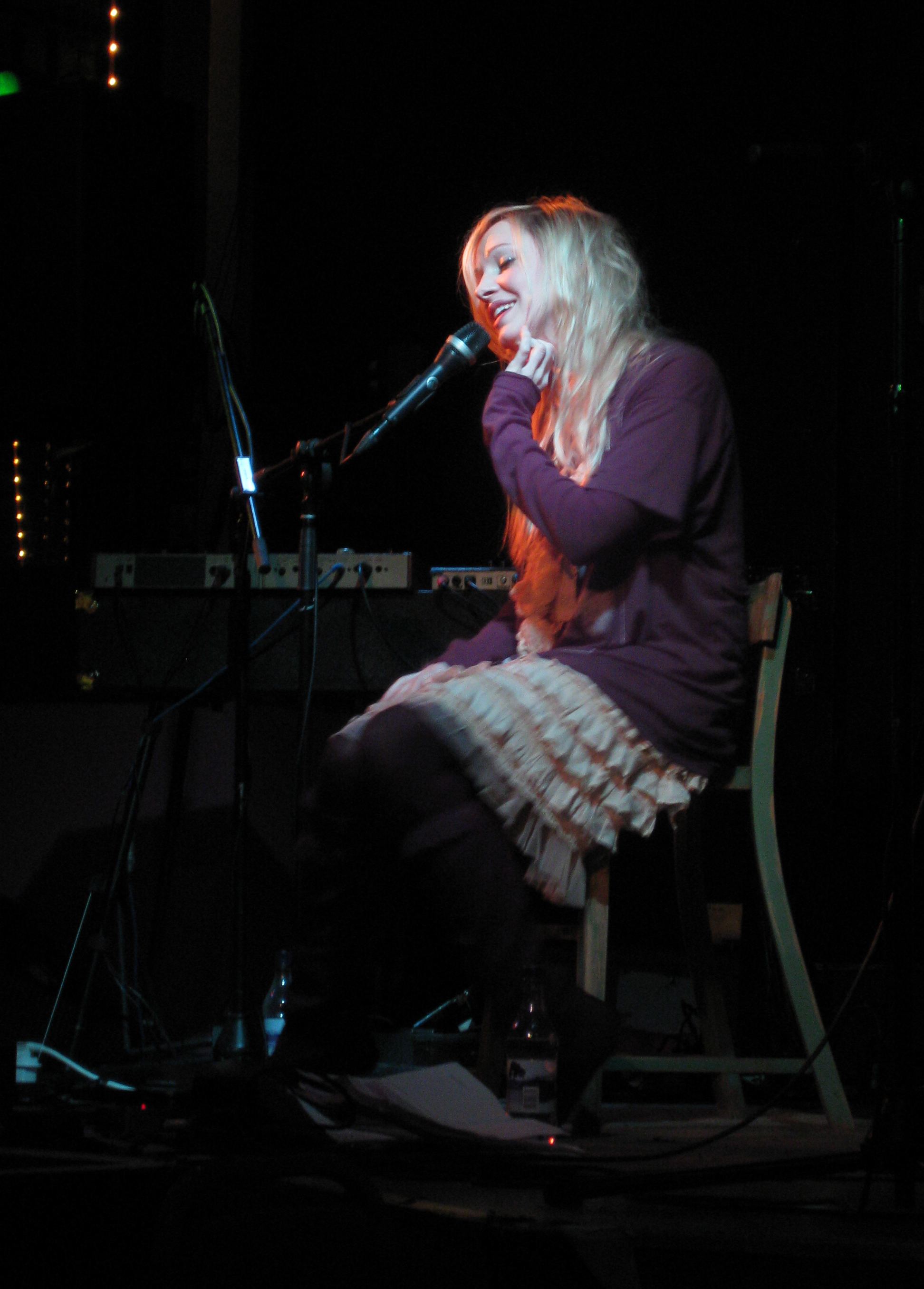
- Stephanie Dosen performing with Snowbird at the Brudenell Social Club, Leeds, England, April 17, 2009

Background information
- Born: May 12, 1973 (age 53); Wisconsin, U.S.
- Occupations: Musician, songwriter
- Instruments: Vocals, guitar
- Years active: 2002–present
- Label: Bella Union

Stephanie Dosen (born May 12, 1973) is an American singer-songwriter, knitwear designer and member of the band Snowbird. She was raised in Wisconsin. Her songs have been featured on the soundtracks of the TV shows Dawson's Creek, NUMB3RS and Party of Five.

== Music career ==
Dosen got her start in 1994 with the band Virus, an ambient techno group whose debut album Analogue was considered groundbreaking in the Christian trance music scene.

In 2002, Dosen released her first solo album, Ghosts, Mice & Vagabonds. The ethereal self-produced work received rave reviews, with Billboard choosing Dosen as one of the top six independent musicians in the Midwest for 2003.

In 2006, Simon Raymonde, a former member of the Cocteau Twins who runs the Bella Union label, heard Dosen's music. As a result, they worked together on the music that became Dosen's second album, A Lily for the Spectre. The album was recorded in Pikeville, Kentucky and North Wales. Dosen appeared on the BBC Two program Later... with Jools Holland and on the Australian TV rock quiz entertainment show RocKwiz. In February 2008, she collaborated with José González for an "iTunes Live: London Sessions" performance.

Dosen joined Massive Attack as a lead vocalist in June 2008. She made her debut at Royal Festival Hall in London, performing in two shows as part of the Meltdown Festival, which the band had been selected to direct that year. Dosen also performed with Massive Attack at the 2008 Glastonbury Festival.

Dosen and Raymonde formed Snowbird in 2009. The duo released their debut album, Moon, on January 27, 2014, on Bella Union.

Dosen sang on three tracks on The Chemical Brothers' album Further, released in 2010. She worked with them again in 2011, co-writing and singing on the theme song of the 2011 British-German film Hanna, and in 2019, contributing with the vocals to a track of the duo's No Geography album.

== Discography ==
- Ghosts, Mice & Vagabonds (2003, STA)
- A Lily for the Spectre (2007, Bella Union)
- Moon (with Snowbird) (2014, Bella Union)

== Knitwear designer ==
Dosen has gained fame in the UK and America as a knitwear designer under her brand Tiny Owl Knits. Her ethereal and innovative designs, complementary to her music, have been featured in both mainstream and knitting magazines, including BUST, Handmade Living, Simply Knitting and Yarn Forward. In 2013, she released her first knitting pattern book, Woodland Knits, which topped Amazon's "Books of the Year" craft category roundup.
