= Where Soldiers Come From =

- Directed by: Heather Courtney
- Written by: Heather Courtney
- Produced by: Heather Courtney; Megan Gilbride; David Hartstein
- Cinematography: Heather Courtney; Justin Hennard
- Edited by: Kyle Henry; Heather Courtney; Tom Haneke
- Music by: This Will Destroy You
- Release date: March 14, 2011
- Running time: 93 minutes
- Country: United States
- Language: English

Where Soldiers Come From is a 2011 American documentary film directed by Heather Courtney. The film is an intimate look at a group of young American men who join the Michigan Army National Guard, their families, and the town they come from. Director Heather Courtney follows these young men closely, as they transition from small town teenagers to Army guardsmen during the war in Afghanistan. Their story continues to follow the 23-year-old veterans dealing with the less visible wounds of Traumatic Brain Injury (TBI) and PTSD. It premiered at South by Southwest festival, where it won the best documentary editing award. In 2012, the film won a News & Documentary Emmy Award for Outstanding Continuing Coverage of a News Story (Long Form), as well as the Truer Than Fiction Independent Spirit Award.

== Plot ==
Motivated by a variety of reasons from college tuition support, to a sense of purpose, best friends Dominic and Cole join the Army National Guard after graduating from their rural high school. After persuading several of their friends to join them, the young men are sent to Afghanistan as part of the 107th Engineer Battalion, 168th Engineer Brigade, where they are tasked with searching for roadside bombs in order to keep roads safe for other troops. By the time their deployment ends, they are no longer the carefree group of friends they were before enlisting; repeated bombs blasts around their convoys have led to TBI symptoms, and they have become increasingly disillusioned about their mission.

Coming home is no relief as they are now confronted with the silent war wounds of PTSD and TBI. The soldiers struggle with reintegration with society and some miss the simplicity in life they had while in Afghanistan. The latter half of the documentary focuses on their struggles on the home front and how each of them, and their families try to return to normal life.

== Reception ==
The film received almost universal critical acclaim following both its theatrical release and its national broadcast on the award-winning PBS series POV. Jeannette Catsoulis of The New York Times called it "quietly devastating" and said, "in its compassionate, modest gaze, the real cost of distant political decisions is softly illuminated, as well as the shame of a country with little to offer its less fortunate young people than a ticket to a battlefield.” Hank Stuever of The Washington Post stated that it was "hauntingly beautiful and deeply felt...some of the best Afghanistan war-related storytelling I’ve seen.” In his review of the film, Time's film critic Steven James Snyder called it an "emotional and engrossing portrait of America's bravest." Matt Zoller Seitz of Salon claimed that "the last 10 years have produced an array of documentaries about post-9/11 America, but few are as haunting and compassionate as Heather Courtney’s ‘Where Soldiers Come From.’” Salon also included the film in their list of "the best nonfiction TV of 2011." Documentary filmmaker Michael Moore said the film was "a profoundly moving experience. One of the best movies I have seen this year." As of May 2013, the film had an 81% rating on Rotten Tomatoes.

== Distribution ==
The film had a small theatrical release in Fall 2011, as well as a national broadcast premiere on the PBS series POV in November 2011 and an encore broadcast in September 2012. It is also available through the digital distributor New Video on many digital platforms including iTunes and Netflix, and available for educational distribution at New Day Films.

== Soundtrack ==
The film features the music of Explosions in the Sky, Lanterns On The Lake and This Will Destroy You, as well as an original score by composers Alex Chavez and Chad Stocker.
