= Slow Wall =

EP by Bilbo
- Released: October 6, 2000
- Genre: Folk
- Label: Donkey Boy Records

Bilbo chronology
''Slow Wall'' (2000)	Little Miss Drunk (2002)

Slow Wall is a 3 track EP by Fionn Regan which was released under the name "Bilbo".

== Track listing ==
1. "Slow Wall" - 4:00
2. "Rocking Horse Town" - 2:57
3. "Hello L" - 3:00
