= Snowbird (band) =

- Origin: UK/USA duo
- Genres: Alternative, dream pop
- Years active: 2009-present
- Label: Bella Union
- Members: Stephanie Dosen; Simon Raymonde
- Website: www.facebook.com/wearesnowbird

Snowbird is a British/American band consisting of instrumentalist Simon Raymonde (Cocteau Twins) and vocalist Stephanie Dosen. Dosen, originally a member of the 1990s techno band Virus, sang live with Massive Attack in 2008 and later collaborated with The Chemical Brothers. Dosen and Raymonde first worked together on her second solo album, A Lily for the Spectre, released by Bella Union in 2007. The duo's debut album as Snowbird, Moon, was released on 27 January 2014 on Bella Union.

== Career as Snowbird ==
Snowbird debuted with a concert in June 2009 at Union Chapel, Islington.

The band recorded a cover of Pink Floyd's "Goodbye Blue Sky" that year, which appeared on The Wall Re-Built! compilation, a tribute to The Wall given away free with the December 2009 issue of Mojo. It was followed by a version of the British nursery rhyme "The North Wind Doth Blow" on 2010 compilation Sing Me to Sleep, Indie Lullabies.

In winter 2013, Snowbird announced the upcoming release of Moon in January 2014. Guest musicians on the album included Ed O'Brien and Philip Selway of Radiohead, Eric Pulido and McKenzie Smith of Midlake, Paul Gregory of Lanterns on the Lake, and Jonathan Wilson.

The album came packaged with a second disc titled Luna, consisting of remixes of each song by RxGibbs.

== Discography ==
=== Albums ===
- Moon (2014, Bella Union)

=== Compilation appearances ===
- "Goodbye Blue Sky" on The Wall Re-Built! (2009, Mojo)
- "The North Wind Doth Blow" on Sing Me to Sleep, Indie Lullabies (2010, American Laundromat Records)
