= Campaign Button =

EP by Fionn Regan
- Released: 2005
- Genre: Folk
- Label: Anvil

Fionn Regan chronology
| Hotel Room EP (2004) | ''Campaign Button'' (2005) | The End of History (2006) |

Campaign Button is a 4-track CD EP of songs by the Irish singer/songwriter Fionn Regan.

== Track listing ==
1. "Campaign Button" – 3:09
2. "Medicine Chest" – 3:26
3. "The Ballad of the Toad Eaters" – 3:05
4. "Ice Cap Lullaby" – 1:24
