= Home Recording Sampler =

Studio album by Fionn Regan
- Genre: Folk
- Label: Anvil

Home Recording Sampler is a three track sampler CD by Fionn Regan, that was limited to 300 copies, all of which had hand painted sleeves and were hand numbered.

== Track listing ==
1. "Noah (Ghost in a Sheet)" - 3:07
2. "Red Lane" - 3:44
3. "Black Water Child" - 3:27
