= Spook the Herd =

Studio album by Lanterns on the Lake
- Released: 21 February 2020
- Length: 39:57
- Label: Bella Union

Lanterns on the Lake chronology
Live with Royal Northern Sinfonia (2017)	Spook the Herd (2020)	Versions of Us (2023)

Professional ratings
Aggregate scores
Source	Rating
Metacritic	79/100
Review scores
Source	Rating
AllMusic	4/5 stars
The Line of Best Fit	9/10
MusicOMH	5/5 stars

Spook the Herd is the fourth studio album by British indie rock band Lanterns on the Lake. It was released on 21 February 2020 under Bella Union.

== Critical reception ==
Spook the Herd was met with generally favourable reviews from critics. At Metacritic, which assigns a weighted average rating out of 100 to reviews from mainstream publications, this release received an average score of 79, based on 8 reviews.

The album was shortlisted for the Hyundai Mercury Prize 2020.

The song "A Fitting End" was included for the soundtrack of the Square Enix game, Life Is Strange: Reunion.

== Track listing ==
All tracks are written by Lanterns on the Lake.

Spook the Herd track listing
No.	Title	Length
1.	"When It All Comes True"	4:21
2.	"Baddies"	2:57
3.	"Every Atom"	4:19
4.	"Blue Screen Beams"	4:28
5.	"Before They Excavate"	4:52
6.	"Swimming Lessons"	4:22
7.	"Secrets & Medicine"	4:53
8.	"This Is Not a Drill"	4:41
9.	"A Fitting End"	5:04
