= The End of History (album) =

Studio album by Fionn Regan
- Released: 7 August 2006
- Recorded: 2005–2006
- Genre: Folk
- Length: 49:41
- Labels: Bella Union (UK); Lost Highway (US)
- Producer: Fionn Regan

Fionn Regan chronology
The End of History (2006)	The Shadow of an Empire (2010)

Singles from The End of History
- 1. "Be Good or Be Gone" Released: 5 February 2006

The End of History is the debut studio album by the Irish folk musician Fionn Regan, released on 7 August 2006 on Bella Union. The album was nominated for the 2007 Mercury Prize, and was also named Best Irish Album of 2006 by the Irish Independent.

Professional ratings
Review scores
Source	Rating
AllMusic	4/5 stars
Drowned in Sound	8/10 stars
The Guardian	4/5 stars

== Track listing ==
All tracks are written by Fionn Regan.

No.	Title	Length
1.	"Be Good or Be Gone"	3:20
2.	"The Underwood Typewriter"	3:03
3.	"Hunters Map"	3:39
4.	"Hey Rabbit"	3:33
5.	"Black Water Child"	3:00
6.	"Put a Penny in the Slot"	4:02
7.	"The Cowshed"	3:32
8.	"Snowy Atlas Mountains"	4:14
9.	"Noah (Ghost in a Sheet)"	3:40
10.	"The End of History"	4:39
11.	"Abacus"	2:36
12.	"Bunker or Basement"	6:26
13.	"Campaign Button" (hidden track)	3:11
Total length:		49:41

iTunes bonus track
No.	Title	Length
14.	"Anglers Curse"	3:54
Total length:		53:35

== Personnel ==
All personnel credits adapted from the album's liner notes.

Performer

- Fionn Regan – vocals, guitar, backing vocals, piano (5), banjo (6), saw (7), tambourine (10), producer, mixing, design, photography

Additional musicians

- Jamie Morrison – drums (3, 5, 7), vibrations (2)
- Louis Vause – piano (12)
- Laura Murphy – backing vocals (5)
- Anna Phoebe – violin (8, 9)
- Oli – cello, violin (2)

Technical personnel

- Karl Odlum – bass (7, 10), engineer (1, 3, 4, 7, 10, 11, 13)
- Mike Pellanconi – engineer (3, 5, 7–9, 12)
- Mark Bishop – engineer (2)
- Liam Mulvaney – engineer (5)
- Simon Raymonde – mixing
- Finn Eiles – mixing engineer
- Denis Blackham – mastering

== Chart positions ==
Chart (2006)	Peak position
Irish Albums Chart	29
Chart (2007)	Peak position
UK Albums Chart	123
