= Reservoir (EP) =

EP by Fionn Regan
- Released: 20 January 2003
- Genre: Folk
- Label: Anvil

Fionn Regan chronology
Little Miss Drunk (2002)	''Reservoir'' (2003)	Hotel Room EP (2004)

Reservoir is a four-song CD EP by Irish singer/songwriter Fionn Regan. It was released 20 January 2003 on Anvil Records.

== Track listing ==
1. "Reservoir" – 4:44
2. "Red Lane" – 3:50
3. "Noah (Ghost in a Sheet)" – 3:12
4. "After the Fall" – 3:40
