= Treasure (Cocteau Twins album) =

1984 studio album by Cocteau Twins

Studio album by Cocteau Twins
- Released: 12 November 1984
- Recorded: August–September 1984
- Studios: Palladium Studios, Edinburgh; Rooster, West London
- Genres: Ethereal wave; dream pop
- Length: 41:19
- Label: 4AD
- Producer: Cocteau Twins

Cocteau Twins chronology
The Spangle Maker (1984)	Treasure (1984)	Aikea-Guinea (1985)

Treasure is the third studio album by Scottish rock band Cocteau Twins, released on 12 November 1984 by 4AD. With this album, the band settled on what would, from then on, be their primary lineup: vocalist Elizabeth Fraser, guitarist Robin Guthrie and bass guitarist Simon Raymonde. The album also reflected the group's embrace of the distinctive ethereal sound with which they became associated.

The album reached number 29 on the UK Albums Chart, becoming the band's first UK Top 40 album, and charted for eight weeks. It also became one of the band's most critically successful releases, although the band considered it underdeveloped. The track "Lorelei" became a minor dance hit during the mid-1980s.

== Background and music ==
The album was recorded from August to September 1984 at Palladium Studios in Edinburgh and at Rooster in West London.

Record label executive Ivo Watts-Russell originally tried to hire Brian Eno and Daniel Lanois to produce the album. However, Eno felt the band did not need him and Guthrie ended up producing the album. Pitchfork noted that the album's drum machine backing added a sharp edge in contrast to the band's ethereal sound and Elizabeth Fraser's "angelic vocals". On the album's title, Fraser said, "I thought it was a really good idea because I thought, well, what are people gonna see in these names? They're gonna realise it’s got nothing to do with mythology and all that bollocks. Well, it's not bollocks, but I foolishly thought people wouldn't think that we were into that sort of thing".

== Reception and release ==
Professional ratings
Review scores
Source	Rating
AllMusic	4.5/5 stars
Louder Than War	10/10
Q	4/5 stars
Record Collector	5/5 stars
Record Mirror	4/5 stars
The Rolling Stone Album Guide	3.5/5 stars
Smash Hits	8/10
Spin Alternative Record Guide	9/10
Stylus Magazine	7/10
Uncut	9/10

Treasure is considered by many fans to be the band's finest work, and has received critical acclaim. Upon its release, Smash Hits Ian Cranna gave the album an 8 out of 10 rating, finding Cocteau Twins on their third album in a "noticeably lighter mood. The songs are airier, almost swinging, with more delicate acoustic guitar than the familiar electric razzle" and noting Elizabeth Fraser's vocals that "soars, weaves or whispers through the instrumental mix (,,,) to build beguiling, impressionist pieces based on vaguely Victorian names." Steve Sutherland in Melody Maker described the album as "true brilliance" and stated that the band were "the voice of God".

Retrospectively, Pitchfork wrote, "Cocteau Twins' third album was titled simply enough. Treasure was an adjective for the endlessly inventive melodic lines you'd find buried in these songs, and a verb for what you'd do with them for years to come", and noted that the record signalled the start of Cocteau Twins' "signature ethereality". Ned Raggett of AllMusic complimented its "accomplished variety", saying, "Treasure lives up to its title and then some as a thorough and complete triumph". BBC Online wrote, "Treasure was where the Cocteau Twins first got it 100 percent right".

In March 2018, the album was repressed on 180g vinyl using new masters created from high definition files transferred from the original analogue tapes.

== Legacy and accolades ==
Jeff Terich of Treblezine placed the album on his list of best dream pop albums, stating: "In contrast to the band's more abrasive post-punk albums that arrived earlier, Treasure is an exercise in making beauty seem alien, and making alienation seem sublime, for that matter". Slant Magazine listed the album at No. 74 on its list of the best albums of the 1980s, while NME named Treasure the 37th best album of 1984. Pitchfork listed Treasure as the 27th best album of the 1980s. Paste magazine's Josh Jackson listed the album at No. 38 on his list of "The 50 Best Post-Punk Albums", describing it as "the first full realization of the band's ethereal pop sound". PopMatters included it in their list of the "12 Essential 1980s Alternative Rock Albums" saying, "Fraser's ability to deliver her nonsensical lyrics with the diaphanous touch of a moth or with the muscle of a ravenous lion is astonishing". Jennifer Makowsky concluded that "Treasure is an aptly titled album". The album was included in the 2008 edition of 1001 Albums You Must Hear Before You Die. In Beautiful Noise, the shoegaze/dream pop documentary, Robert Smith of the Cure calls it one of the most romantic records ever recorded, so much that he played it as he was getting ready on his wedding day. Music critic Jim DeRogatis called Treasure the "strongest" of the band's early releases.

== Track listing ==
All tracks are written by Cocteau Twins (Elizabeth Fraser, Robin Guthrie and Simon Raymonde).

Side A
No.	Title	Length
1.	"Ivo"	3:53
2.	"Lorelei"	3:43
3.	"Beatrix"	3:11
4.	"Persephone"	4:20
5.	"Pandora (for Cindy)"	5:35

Side B
No.	Title	Length
1.	"Amelia"	3:31
2.	"Aloysius"	3:26
3.	"Cicely"	3:29
4.	"Otterley"	4:04
5.	"Donimo"	6:19

Initial pressings of the Canadian LP release included the "Aikea-Guinea" 12" single as a bonus.

== Personnel ==
Cocteau Twins

- Elizabeth Fraser – vocals, production
- Robin Guthrie – guitar, keyboards, production
- Simon Raymonde – bass guitar, production

Production

- Droston J. Madden – engineering
- Jon Turner – engineering
- 23 Envelope – sleeve design

== Charts ==
Chart performance for Treasure
Chart (1984)	Peak position
New Zealand Albums (RMNZ)	34
Swedish Albums (Sverigetopplistan)	32
UK Albums (Official Charts)	29

== Sources ==
- Raymonde, Simon. In One Ear: Cocteau Twins, Ivor Raymonde and Me. Nine Eight Books, 2024. ISBN 978-1-7887-0938-5
