= The Shadow of an Empire =

Studio album by Fionn Regan
- Released: 5 February 2010
- Genre: Folk
- Label: Heavenly Records (UK); Universal Music Ireland (IE); Diverse Records (vinyl)

Fionn Regan chronology
The End of History (2006)	''The Shadow of an Empire'' (2010)	100 Acres of Sycamore (2011)

Professional ratings
Aggregate scores
Source	Rating
Metacritic	81/100
Review scores
Source	Rating
Clash	7/10
Dotmusic	7/10
Drowned in Sound	7/10
The Guardian	4/5 stars
The Independent	3/5 stars
Mojo	4/5 stars
musicOMH	4/5 stars
Q	4/5 stars
The Telegraph	4/5 stars
Uncut	4/5 stars

The Shadow of an Empire is the second studio album by Irish singer-songwriter Fionn Regan, released on 5 February 2010 in Ireland by Universal Music Ireland and on 8 February 2010 in the United Kingdom by Heavenly Records. The album was later released on vinyl on 8 February 2011 via Diverse Records. The album's aesthetic differs from Regan's previous album, The End of History, featuring more electric guitar-based rock songs. Regarding this change in musical direction, Regan stated, "This album's lyrically quite fast, with lots of word changes and phrase changes, and it asked for a different kind of coat." In October 2009 the first single, "Protection Racket" was released as a free download.

Following the album's release, Regan toured with support act, Danny and the Champions of the World, appearing as his backing band.

== Background and recording ==
Following the critical success of his debut album, The End of History, Fionn Regan began working on a follow-up with producer Ethan Johns. Described by Regan as "quite an uncompromising record" and "a combination of two uncompromising people", the album was ultimately shelved by his label, Lost Highway.

Regarding their decision not to release the album, Regan states that "Sometimes when you discuss making a record with a record company, everyone draws a sketch of the house, and when you come back with the finished thing it's like, 'Oh, we thought the doors were going to be on the left side.' [...] [the album] is in a vault somewhere. It ended up getting clamped on the docks and the tariff was too high to get it out, and they put red tape around it. And so, I backed out of the drive and made the record that I set out to make."

Regan subsequently left Lost Highway and relocated to Ireland to start afresh, recording in an old biscuit factory.

The majority of The Shadow of an Empire was written whilst Fionn Regan was touring in support of The End of History. Regan states that he wrote character-based songs on his typewriter first, before putting the words to music, and notes that:

touring is very different to sitting in a room with a piano, and that was a big part of it, and some of the tunes this time felt like I could move them. Like I could do them in a country way, and then in a straightforward, kind of Velvet Underground way, and then put them on acoustic guitar. The results were just what felt like a good fit. There are lots of other versions, and that was different for me, I found that really interesting, that the tracks became kind of movable beasts. It's something I’m working on live, too. Maybe I don't always want to play a guitar, you know? The lyrics are the centre pole, and now I can swing whatever canopy I want over it.

== Track listing ==
All tracks written and arranged by Fionn Regan.

1. "Protection Racket" – 2:39
2. "Catacombs" – 3:25
3. "Coathook" – 2:20
4. "Genocide Matinee" – 3:52
5. "Violent Demeanour" – 3:32
6. "Lines Written In Winter" – 3:58
7. "House Detective" – 3:06
8. "Little Nancy" – 3:17
9. "Lord Help My Poor Soul" – 4:45
10. "The Shadow of an Empire" – 4:04

== Personnel ==
Adapted from the album liner notes.

=== Musicians ===
- Fionn Regan – vocals, guitar, organ, piano, lapsteel, tambourine, bullhorn, bass guitar ("Genocide Matinee")
- Brian Murphy – drums, bass guitar ("Protection Racket")
- Stephen O'Brien – bass guitar
- Laura Murphy – backing vocals ("Catacombs", "Violent Demeanor", "Little Nancy"), reception bell ("Protection Racket")
- Drew McConnell – bass guitar ("Lord Help My Poor Soul")
- Gavin Wheatley – piano ("Violent Demeanor", "House Detective")

=== Production ===
- Fionn Regan – producer, additional engineering ("Genocide Matinee")
- Brian Murphy – engineer
- Stephen O'Brien – engineering assistant
- Paul Stacy – mixing
- Steve Rooke — mastering

=== Artwork ===
- Fionn Regan – artwork, design
- Laura Murphy – artwork assistant
- Autumn de Wilde – cover photograph
- Swollen Design – photography of artwork and layout
