= Lanterns on the Lake =

English indie band

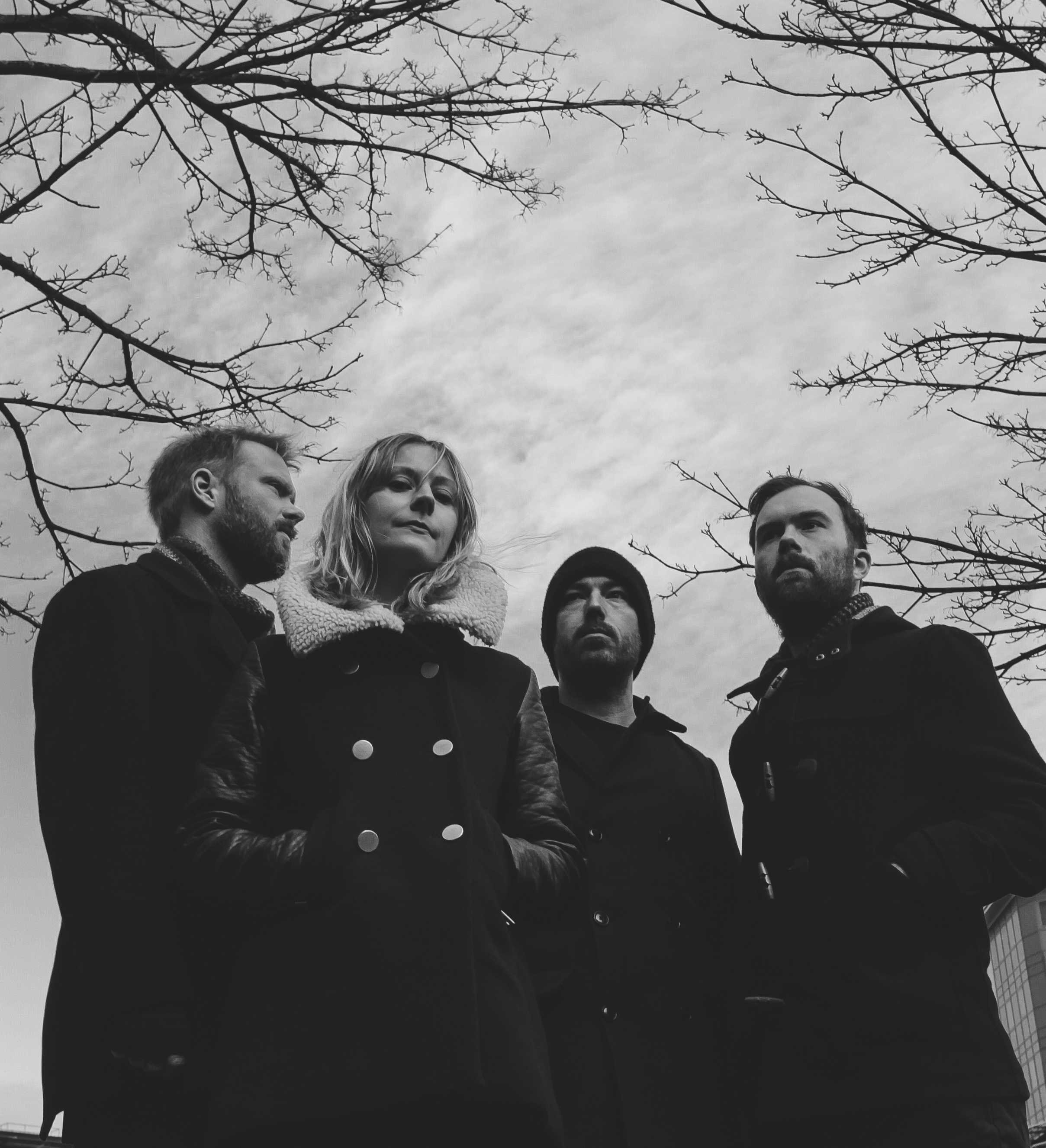

Background information
- Origin: Newcastle upon Tyne, England
- Genre: Indie rock
- Years active: 2007–present
- Label: Bella Union
- Members: Hazel Wilde; Paul Gregory; Bob Allan; Matt Hardy
- Website: lanternsonthelake.com

Lanterns on the Lake is an English indie rock band from Newcastle upon Tyne, England. The band is composed of Hazel Wilde, Paul Gregory, Bob Allan and Angela Chan. The group's material is released in Europe by Bella Union and by PIAS in the US. The band were nominated for the Mercury Prize in 2020 for their fourth studio album, Spook the Herd. For their fifth album, Versions of Us (2023), they recruited Radiohead drummer Philip Selway to perform drums and percussion.

== Formation and early work (2007–2010) ==
Lanterns on the Lake formed in 2007 and was founded by core members Wilde & Gregory, and former member Oliver Ketteringham.

They self-released two EPs and a single before signing to the Bella Union record label in December 2010.

The band played a host of music festivals including End of the Road Festival, Glastonbury Festival, SXSW, and Bestival.

== Gracious Tide, Take Me Home (2011) ==
The band released their debut album Gracious Tide, Take Me Home on 19 September 2011. The album was recorded by the band in their homes and produced by the band's guitarist Paul Gregory. The album received mainly positive reviews and received a metacritic rating of 74.

During this period Lanterns on the Lake supported Explosions in the Sky on their UK tour including the O2 Academy, Brixton. The band has also toured with Low, including a performance at the Royal Festival Hall in London and with Yann Tiersen, including a performance at The Roundhouse.

== Until the Colours Run (2013) ==
The band's follow-up album Until the Colours Run was released on 7 October 2013 in UK and Europe. The album received positive reviews, receiving a metacritic rating of 84 with many reviewers noting its socio-political undertones. Drowned in Sound declared it "one of the best records of the young decade".

The group extensively toured Europe, and in early 2014 they embarked on their first tour of the US.

== Beings (2015) ==
On 13 November 2015 the group released their third album Beings worldwide. Beings was met with critical acclaim with Drowned in Sound declaring Lanterns on the Lake as "One of Britain's most crucial bands of the present moment." and DIY Magazine describing the group as "virtually without equal".

== Live with Royal Northern Sinfonia (2016) ==
Following the release of Beings, Lanterns on the Lake toured Europe and the UK extensively and at this time performed their largest hometown concert to date where they were accompanied by Royal Northern Sinfonia at Sage Gateshead in Hall One, the orchestral arrangements composed by Fiona Brice.

The show was recorded and subsequently released as a live album in November 2017 – Live with Royal Northern Sinfonia. Wilde commented that the live album "feels to be retrospectively like a line that we were drawing under what had come before for our band. We’d done three albums, had some ups and downs, had band members quit. There’d been a lot of difficulties for us over the years and yet we’d persevered because we still believed in it. So by the time we’d finished touring the third album Beings we were actually in a really good place...Then there we were...in our hometown and so many people there to see us including people who had been following our band since the start and been on the journey with us...It kind of felt like a celebration of all the music we’d made in the past and a bit of a release for us personally because all that perseverance had in some ways paid off – at least in the sense that we were still going and we were able to be there, then, in that moment. So looking back now it feels to me like a closing of a chapter for us." '

== Spook the Herd (2020) ==
Following touring throughout 2016 the band took a break. In an interview Wilde commented "I don’t think we ever said it would be the absolute end.. (But) I don’t think people would have blamed us for throwing in the towel at that point – we’d had a good run at it.. that would have been a good place to call it a day but we felt there was probably more we had to offer and further to go creatively, we just weren’t sure what or where that would be. And, if I’m honest, I was personally just a bit tired at that point."

It was during this break that Wilde began writing many of the songs that would go on to make up Spook the Herd. The band developed the songs over the course of a year before recording at Distant City studios in Yorkshire. This was the first time the group had gone into a studio to record. Wilde has commented that "We are a pretty insular band in how we work, and trusting other people enough to allow them to get involved is not always easy for us."The album was produced by the band and mixed by the band's guitarist Paul Gregory.

The album was released in February 2020 and received positive reviews with MusicOMH describing it as "a masterpiece". The album was noted for reflecting on issues including polarized politics, social media, addiction, grief and the climate crisis. The album was shortlisted for the Mercury Prize in 2020.

The group donated royalties from the singe Baddies to Stop Funding Hate.

== Versions of Us (2023) ==
In June 2023, Lanterns on the Lake released their fifth album, Versions of Us. Following the departure of the drummer, Ol Ketteringham, they recruited Radiohead drummer, Philip Selway, to perform drums and percussion. According to Wilde, Selway helped them create a "whole other version" of the album and restored their confidence in the songs. Versions of Us received acclaim, with a Metacritic score of 82.

== There's a Bird in My Ribcage (2027) ==
In November 2026 the group announced their sixth studio album, There's a Bird in My Ribcage would be released on 19th March 2027.

== Soundtracks and other work ==
The song "I Love You Sleepyhead" was used in the film Where Soldiers Come From.

The song "Through the Cellar Door" has been taken for the soundtrack of the Square Enix game Life Is Strange: Before the Storm. Also, "A Fitting End" has been included for the soundtrack of the Life Is Strange: Reunion.

The group composed the music for all BT Sport's Champions League coverage beginning August 2020.

The group provided the theme song "Don't Have Nightmares" written especially for the hit BBC podcast series Uncanny, presented by Danny Robins. In 2023 BBC2 aired the first 3 episodes of the Uncanny television series which also featured the group's theme song.

== Members ==
=== Current ===
- Hazel Wilde – vocals, guitar, piano, lyricist (2007–present)
- Paul Gregory – guitar, producer (2007–present)
- Bob Allan – bass (2014–present)
- Matt Hardy – drums, percussion (2023–present)

=== Live, affiliated and past members ===
- Angela Chan – violin, cello, viola (2014–present)
- Philip Selway – drums, percussion (2022–present)
- Sarah Kemp – violin (2008–2014)
- Oliver Ketteringham – drums, piano (2007–2022)
- Andrew Scrogham – bass (2012–2014)
- Brendan Sykes – bass (2008–2012)
- Adam Ian Sykes – vocals, guitar, piano (2008–2012)

== Discography ==
=== Studio albums ===
- Gracious Tide, Take Me Home (September 2011)
- Until the Colours Run (October 2013)
- Beings (November 2015)
- Spook the Herd (February 2020)
- Versions of Us (2 June 2023)
- There's a Bird in My Ribcage (19 March 2027)

=== Compilation and live albums ===
- Live in Concert Lanterns on the Lake with Royal Northern Sinfonia – (Recorded live at Sage Gateshead in February 2016) (November 2017)

=== EPs ===
- The Starlight EP (August 2008)
- Misfortunes and Minor Victories (May 2009)
- Bonus EP (Rough Trade exclusive released with Gracious Tide, Take Me Home) (2011)
- Low Tide (Remix EP, April 2012)
- The Realist (December 2020)

=== Singles ===
- "Lungs Quicken" (2010)
- "Keep on Trying" (2011)
- "Another Tale from Another English Town" (2013)
- "Until the Colours Run" (2013)
- "The Buffalo Days" (2013)
- "Faultlines" (2015)
- "Through the Cellar Door" (2016)
- "The Crawl" (2016)
- "Every Atom" (2020)
- "Baddies" (2020)
- "The Likes of Us" (February 2023)
- "Real Life" (April 2023)
- "Freeze Frame" (November 2026)

=== Other ===
- The band recorded a cover of The Beatles' "Long, Long, Long" for Mojo magazine's 2011 album Harrison Covered: A Tribute to George Harrison.
- The track "Ships in the Rain" features on Rough Trade's 2012 album Counter Culture 11.
- The band have provided remixes for artists such as Radiohead's Phil Selway.
