= 100 Acres of Sycamore =

Studio album by Fionn Regan
- Released: 8 August 2011
- Genre: Folk
- Label: Heavenly
- Producer: Fionn Regan & Sean Read

Fionn Regan chronology
The Shadow of an Empire (2010)	100 Acres of Sycamore (2011)	The Bunkhouse Vol. 1: Anchor Black Tattoo (2012)

Professional ratings
Aggregate scores
Source	Rating
Metacritic	(71/100)
Review scores
Source	Rating
AllMusic	3.5/5 stars
BBC	positive
Clash	(6/10)
Consequence of Sound	3/5 stars
Drowned in Sound	(6/10)
The Telegraph	3/5 stars
The Guardian	4/5 stars
NME	(5/10)

100 Acres of Sycamore is the third studio album by Irish singer-songwriter Fionn Regan, released on 8 August 2011 on Heavenly Records. Unlike Regan's previous album, The Shadow of an Empire, which featured mostly rock and roll songs, the album foregrounds an acoustic aesthetic, similar to that of his debut, The End of History (2006).

Recorded in seven days, 100 Acres of Sycamore features a prominent string section throughout, and features backing vocal contributions from The Staves on the track, "North Star Lover".

== Background and recording ==
Upon meeting actress Anna Friel in Benicassim, in 2010, Regan subsequently began writing 100 Acres of Sycamore whilst staying at her home in Deià, Majorca. Regarding the album's composition, Regan noted, "It was very fast, sometimes when you’re a writer it's like that, lightning strikes, the stars align for whatever reason. [...] The songs were very fast, they flew like liquid gold."

The album was recorded to tape using analogue methods, with Regan noting, "I just love the sound of it, I love the process. I love the idea that there's a master tape. It's a very potent thing." Regan and producer Sean Read recorded using the same console that The White Stripes used to record their fourth studio album, Elephant.

== Writing and composition ==
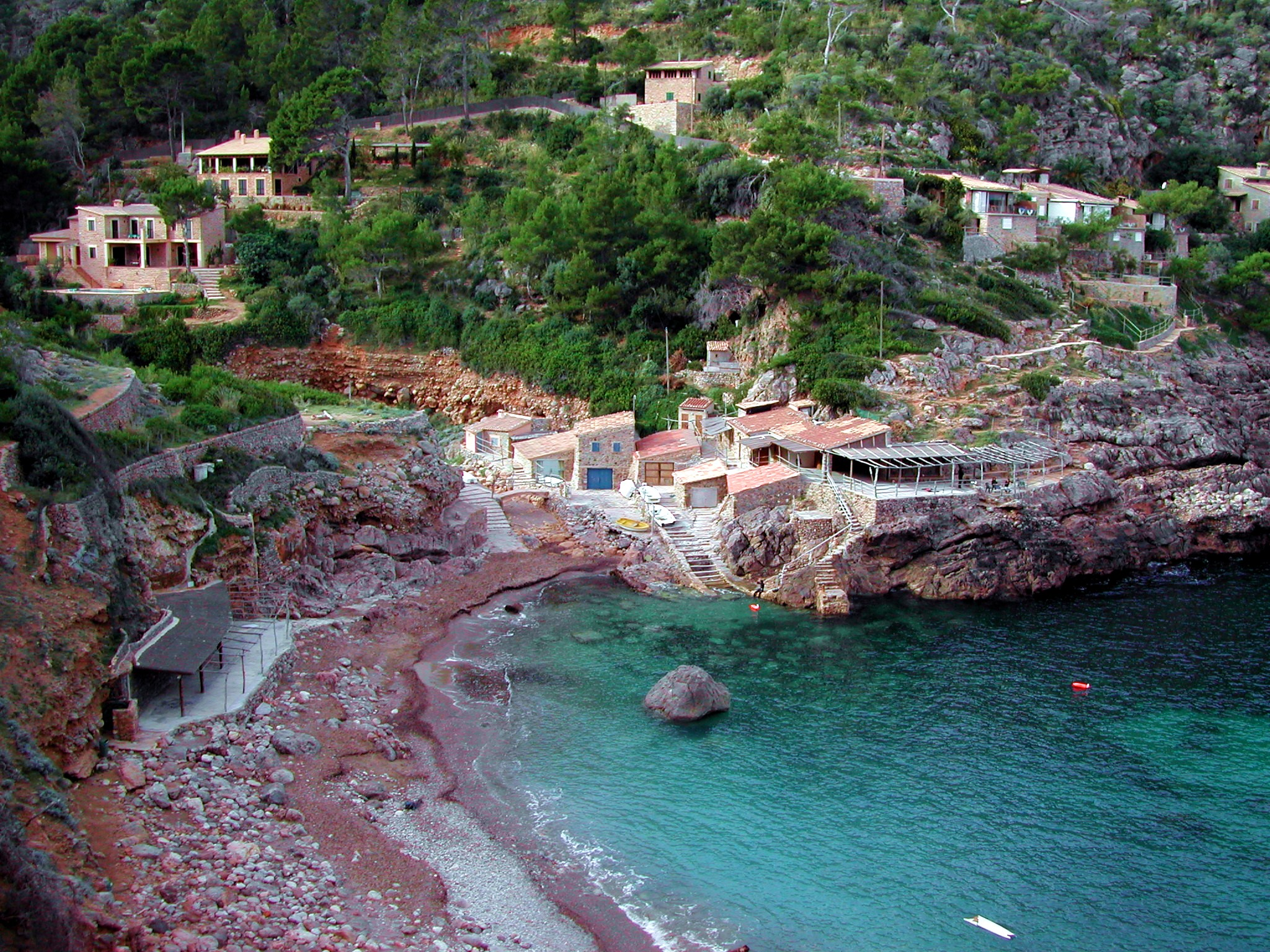
Deià, Majorca, where the majority of the album's material was written.

Much of the album's material was written in Deià, Majorca, with Regan stating, "I think if you could bottle a bit of the atmosphere and put it into the record, it's there. In saying that, I think it's spliced with walking in the woods in Ireland. Regarding his time in Deia, Regan noted, "That probably had most impact on the writing of the record. It’s sort of a place that’s laced with magic, it has the quality of a book, everything there feels like a dreamlike overtone to it. So a lot of the writing on the record and the way it sounds is my impression or whatever way that wove its way into the writing and it came back out in the record."

Regarding the stylistic differences between 100 Acres of Sycamore and his previous album, The Shadow of an Empire, Regan noted, "The last album was kind of like a chrysalis and this is the butterfly. I think sometimes that everyone has to remember that you don't get 'this' without 'that'. This album wouldn't have happened without the last record. The second one wouldn't have happened without the first one. I think sometimes after the first record there might have been a feeling that, because I was on to a good thing, to just repeat it but I wasn't interested in that. It's very important for me to do what feels right at the time." Regan also noted, "My previous record, The Shadow Of An Empire was me looking out of a window at the world. With this one, it’s a clear look in."

Regan describes the track, "Sow Mare Bitch Vixen" as "a celebration of the femme fatale."

== Track listing ==
All songs written and composed by Fionn Regan.

1. "100 Acres of Sycamore" - 5:35
2. "Sow Mare Bitch Vixen" - 3:46
3. "The Horses are Asleep" - 4:39
4. "The Lake District" - 5:37
5. "Dogwood Blossom" - 3:25
6. "For a Nightingale" - 3:44
7. "List of Distractions" - 3:32
8. "1st Day of May" - 2:27
9. "North Star Lover" - 5:20
10. "Woodberry Cemetery" - 1:44
11. "Vodka Sorrow" - 6:04
12. "Golden Light" - 1:35

== Personnel ==
=== Musicians ===
- Fionn Regan - vocals, guitar, piano (11), banjo (9), xylophone (2), bells (2 & 4)
- Lascelle Gordan - drums, percussion
- Howard Gott - violin, glockenspiel (8), string arrangements
- Sarah Wilson - cello
- Ali Friend - double bass
- Sean Read - piano (1 4 6 & 7)
- The Staves - backing vocals (9)
- Jonny Bridgwood - double bass (9)

=== Production ===
- Fionn Regan - producer, mixing, engineer (12)
- Sean Read - producer, engineer
- Owen Morgan - engineer, mixing
- Seb Lewsley - engineer (9)
- Canice Mills - additional engineering
- Mandy Parnell - mastering
- Laura Murphy - production coordinator

=== Artwork ===
- Fionn Regan - artwork
- Swollen Design - layout, design
