= The Bunkhouse Vol. 1: Anchor Black Tattoo =

Studio album by Fionn Regan
- Released: 7 September 2012
- Recorded: 2011–2012
- Genre: Folk
- Length: 25:25
- Label: Universal
- Producer: Fionn Regan

Fionn Regan chronology
100 Acres of Sycamore (2011)	The Bunkhouse Vol. 1: Anchor Black Tattoo (2012)

Singles from The Bunkhouse Vol. 1: Anchor Black Tattoo
- 1. "Salt & Cloves" Released: January 21, 2013

The Bunkhouse Vol. 1: Anchor Black Tattoo is the fourth studio album by the Irish folk musician and singer-songwriter Fionn Regan, released on 7 September 2012 on Universal Music.

== Recording ==
The Bunkhouse Vol.I: Anchor Black Tattoo was recorded at Regan's home studio using a four-track recorder and a single microphone. Regan noted, "I did quite a bit of touring on my own earlier this year supporting Feist and although the rooms were big, I felt very much at home on the stage and after that I had a strong instinct to get right down to the brass tacks, back to the essence of what is it that I do as a songwriter, so that’s what I’ve done."

== Composition ==
Regarding the album's aesthetic, Regan stated, "You can call it folk, but I feel in a lot of ways it’s like an Irish punk album, in that it’s pure, it's stripped down, it goes against the status quo and it was made with just what I have at my disposal. Recording in this way also allowed me to work very quickly, I was documenting as I was writing, so these songs feel very fresh to me, straight out of the ground, which is a really great feeling."

== Track listing ==
All tracks are written by Fionn Regan

No.	Title	Length
1.	"St. Anthony's Fire"	2:37
2.	"67 Blackout"	2:34
3.	"Clara to Calary"	2:33
4.	"Anchor Black Tattoo"	1:46
5.	"Mizen to Malin"	2:46
6.	"The Gouldings"	3:20
7.	"Salt & Cloves"	2:49
8.	"The Bunkhouse"	2:40
9.	"Midnight Ferry Crossing"	2:03
10.	"Moving to Berlin" (not listed on the release)	2:25
Total length:		25:25

iTunes bonus track
No.	Title	Length
11.	"67 Blackout" (outtake)	2:11
Total length:		27:36

== Personnel ==
All personnel credits adapted from The Bunkhouse Vol. 1: Anchor Black Tattoo's liner notes.

Performer

- Fionn Regan – vocals, guitar, producer, mixing, artwork

Technical personnel

- Rob Ferrier – mixing
- Aidan Foley – mastering

== Chart positions ==
Chart (2012)	Peak position
Irish Albums Chart	36
