= Hotel Room EP =

Hotel Room

EP by Fionn Regan
- Released: 15 March 2004
- Genre: Folk
- Label: Anvil

Fionn Regan chronology
Reservoir EP (2003)	''Hotel Room'' (2004)	Campaign Button (2005)

Hotel Room is a five track CD EP of songs by the Irish singer/songwriter Fionn Regan. The secret track at the end of "Old Folks" is called "Jebedi Was A Soldier From Outer Space" which was written and performed by Fionn Regan and was recorded by Fionn's father, Michael O'Toole, on Peggy's tape machine in the hallway of Argyle House at some stage between 1983-84 making Fionn either four or five years old.

== Track listing ==
1. "Hotel Room" – 3:28
2. "Change the Locks" – 3:48
3. "Hunter's Map" – 3:09
4. "Abacus" – 2:41
5. "Old Folks" – 7:26
