= Simon Raymonde =

British musician and member of the Cocteau Twins (born 1962)

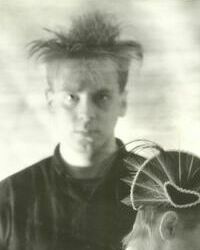
- Raymonde in 1986

Background information
- Born: 3 April 1962 (age 64); Lewisham, London, England
- Genres: Alternative rock; dream pop; ambient
- Occupations: Record producer; musician; record label owner
- Instruments: Bass; piano; guitar; keyboards; violin
- Label: Bella Union

Simon Philip Raymonde (born 3 April 1962) is an English musician and record producer. He is the son of arranger and composer Ivor Raymonde. He is best known as the bass guitarist and keyboard player with the Scottish band Cocteau Twins from 1983 to 1997. He now runs the Bella Union record label and management company Bella Union Artist Management.

Raymonde has acted as producer and mixer on many records, including Clearlake's Cedars, James Yorkston's Moving Up Country, the first two albums by John Grant's first band the Czars, three albums by the Duke Spirit including the hit album Cuts Across the Land, Archie Bronson Outfit's "Kangaroo Heart", Anthony Reynolds' "Just So You Know" and the Open's Silent Hours. He co-produced the posthumous album from Billy Mackenzie. He also mixed the Fionn Regan album The End of History, which was nominated for the 2007 Mercury Music Prize, and the album The Texas-Jerusalem Crossroads by Lift to Experience. Raymonde remixed tracks for Archive, Tristeza and Departure Lounge.

His memoir In One Ear: Cocteau Twins, Ivor Raymonde and Me was published on 12 September 2024.

== Career ==
Raymonde began his career as bassist for London-based post-punk band Drowning Craze, who released three singles on Situation 2: "Storage Case" (1981), "Trance" (1981) and "Heat" (1982).

In 1984, Raymonde joined Cocteau Twins, filling the void left by the departed bassist Will Heggie. He remained as a core writer in the band until its dissolution in 1997. As well as his work with Cocteau Twins, he also contributed to the first two albums by This Mortal Coil, another 4AD project.

Raymonde's debut solo album, Blame Someone Else, was released on 6 October 1997, and featured Elizabeth Fraser of Cocteau Twins. In 2007, he made an appearance in the documentary film Scott Walker: 30 Century Man. In 2009, Raymonde formed the group Snowbird with Stephanie Dosen.

Bella Union was named the Best Independent Label of the Year in 2010, as voted by the UK's indie retailers, and later won this award again in 2012, 2014 and 2016.

In 2011, he was asked to be the music supervisor for Jonathan Caouette's documentary Walk Away Renee, which was accepted for the Cannes Film Festival and released in May 2013.

In 2012, Bella Union celebrated its 15th year, and the label was asked to host and curate the Friday line-up at the End of the Road Festival that September.

Between 2012–2015, Raymonde presented a show on Amazing Radio on Monday evenings, and has stood in for John Kennedy on his Xposure show on Radio X.

He was vice-chairman of the board at the Association of Independent Music in 2013, and has spoken regularly around the world about his experiences in the industry. He presented a weekend workshop with music students at QUT in Brisbane, and has also done master classes at Middlesex University, BIMM and the Academy of Contemporary Music at UCO in Oklahoma City. He served as the keynote speaker at Big Sound in Australia, Going Global in New Zealand and Norwich's Sound & Vision (where he was interviewed by John Robb).

On 27 January 2014, he released his first music in 17 years, with the band Snowbird. Their album Moon was issued as a vinyl package with one black vinyl and one white vinyl, with artwork designed by Vaughan Oliver and a bonus electronic dub remix album by RxGibbs called Luna.

In summer 2015, he started a new musical project with musician Richard Thomas (formerly of Dif Juz and the Jesus and Mary Chain), called Lost Horizons. Their album, Ojalá, was released on Bella Union in November 2017. The album was named Rough Trade "Album of the Month"; following this, the band were invited by Perfume Genius to be part of the Le Guess Who festival in Utrecht.

In 2018, Bella Union released two double albums celebrating the work of Raymonde's late father, Ivor, who worked with the Walker Brothers, David Bowie, Tom Jones and Dusty Springfield, among others.

In 2018, Simon and his wife, Abbey Raymonde, started the management side of Bella Union, working with Brighton-based Penelope Isles. In March 2022, Bella Union celebrated its 25th anniversary in Austin at SXSW festival with around 15 bands performing across two stages at the legendary MOHAWK venue, then in May 2022 Simon and his fellow Cocteau Twins Elizabeth and Robin received an Ivors Academy's Visionary Award. In 2023, the "Heaven or Las Vegas" LP received the SAY (Scottish Album Of The Year) Award for Classic Album.

== Discography ==
=== Albums ===
- Treasure with Cocteau Twins (1984)
- The Pink Opaque with Cocteau Twins (1986)
- The Moon and the Melodies with Cocteau Twins and Harold Budd (1986)
- Blue Bell Knoll with Cocteau Twins (1988)
- Heaven or Las Vegas with Cocteau Twins (1990)
- Four-Calendar Café with Cocteau Twins (1993)
- Milk & Kisses with Cocteau Twins (1996)
- Blame Someone Else (1997)
- Luminus Love in 23 with Nanaco (1998)
- Moon with Snowbird (2014)
- Ojalá with Lost Horizons (2017)
- In Quiet Moments with Lost Horizons (2021)

== Books ==
- Raymonde, Simon (2024). In One Ear: Cocteau Twins, Ivor Raymonde and Me. Nine Eight Books. ASIN B0CW1KC9NS. ISBN 9781788709385. OCLC 1446131471.

== Sources ==
- Aston, Martin. Facing the Other Way: The Story of 4AD. The Friday Project, 2013. ISBN 978-0-0074-8961-9
