= Fionn Regan =

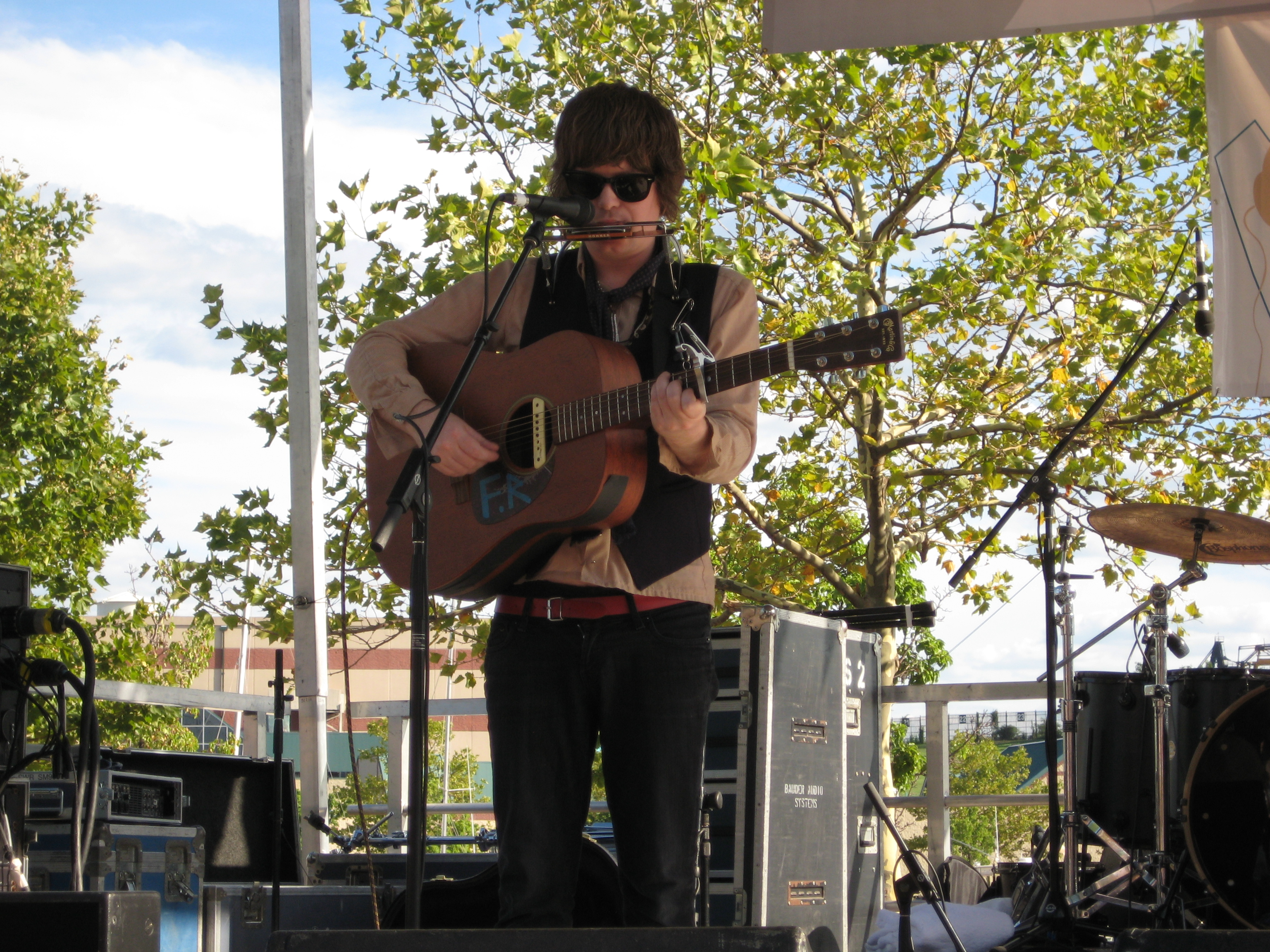
- Regan performing live in 2007.

Background information
- Born: 1981 (age 44–45); Bray, County Wicklow, Ireland
- Genres: Folk, folk rock
- Occupations: Musician, singer-songwriter
- Instruments: Vocals, guitar, piano, harmonica, percussion
- Years active: 2000–present
- Labels: Tsuneni Ai (Abbey Records), Anvil, Bella Union, Lost Highway, Heavenly
- Website: fionnregan.com

Fionn Regan (born 1981) is an Irish folk musician and singer-songwriter. Born and raised in Bray, Regan came to prominence with the release of his debut studio album, The End of History in 2006. He had been releasing extended plays for six years on independent record labels prior to the album's release. Regan's second studio album, The Shadow of an Empire was released in 2010 to positive reviews and his third studio album, 100 Acres of Sycamore, was released in 2011. His fourth studio album, The Bunkhouse Vol. 1: Anchor Black Tattoo, was released in 2012.

Among the accolades Regan has received nominations for the Choice Music Prize in Ireland, the Mercury Prize in the United Kingdom and the Shortlist Music Prize in the United States. Regan has cited Bob Dylan and Neil Young as influences on his music and has been referred to by Lucinda Williams as "his generation's answer to Bob Dylan".

== Career ==
Regan's early releases included the single "Little Miss Drunk", a 7", and two EPs titled Hotel Room and Reservoir, which were released on a small indie label, Anvil Records. He also self-released a 'tour only' EP called Campaign Button. Following these releases, in 2006 Regan signed to former Cocteau Twin Simon Raymonde's independent record label, Bella Union in the UK, resulting in Regan's debut album The End of History being released on 7 August 2006 to major critical acclaim. Regan was hailed as a leader of the new 'Brit' folk movement, The Guardian saying "Folk has a new Pied Piper."

Following his UK success, Regan was subsequently signed by the American label Lost Highway Records. The End of History was released in the US on 10 July 2007. The End of History was produced by Regan himself (mixing the album with Simon Raymonde). Mojo magazine gave the album four stars in a review that dubbed the disc "a debut that oozes rare confidence, startling maturity and originality". The album received a slew of 4 and 5 star reviews from publications including The Times and The Guardian.

Regan has toured worldwide and played many festivals around the world including the Glastonbury Festival, XPoNential Music Festival in Camden, New Jersey, Electric Picnic (Ireland), Summercase and Benicassim (Spain), Bestival (Isle of Wight) ACL (Austin, Texas) Hardly Strictly Bluegrass (San Francisco) and Laneways Festival Australia. He was invited to perform with Lucinda Williams on her 2007 tour, Williams saying at the Irving Plaza NY concert that Fionn is "his generation's answer to Bob Dylan". Around this time, Regan was photographed by Annie Leibovitz for Vanity Fair magazine's prestigious music portfolio.

In July 2008, Regan was invited to perform as part of a filmed live concert, "Liam Clancy: Live The Bitter End". During this concert in honour of Liam Clancy, he shared the stage with Clancy, Tom Paxton, Shane MacGowan and Odetta. This was Odetta's last filmed performance before her death. This was also Liam Clancy's final filmed concert. Clancy had first risen to fame as part of The Clancy Brothers, the group which first sparked the Irish folk revival of the 1960s.

In 2008 Regan recorded a follow-up album to The End of History with producer Ethan Johns (son of the legendary 60's producer Glyn Johns) for the Lost Highway label, who refused to release it. The album remains unreleased and Regan has referred to this album as The Red Tapes. The following year (2009) Regan retreated to County Wicklow, Ireland to record what would become The Shadow of an Empire without any record label involvement or intrusion. Jeff Barrett of Heavenly Records was one of the first to hear the completed album and quickly signed him up. Regan released the album to critical acclaim on 8 February 2010, achieving several four-star reviews from several publications, including Mojo, Uncut, Q, Hot Press, Financial Times, The Daily Telegraph, The Guardian and The Independent.

In 2010, Regan gave a special performance in Dylan Thomas' boathouse in Laugharne, Wales. The following year in August, Regan released his third studio album, 100 Acres of Sycamore, with the track "Dogwood Blossom" featuring prominently in Shane Meadows' TV drama This Is England '88. Regan performed at the Eurosonic Festival in 2012 when Ireland was the "Spotlight Country".

On 17 August 2012, Hot Press announced that Regan had completed his fourth studio album, The Bunkhouse Vol. 1: Anchor Black Tattoo. The album was released on 7 September and Regan described the album by saying: "you can call it folk but I feel in a lot of ways it's like an Irish punk album, in that it's pure, it's stripped down." The album's themes range from the Irish Sea ("Mizen to Malin") to "the hallucinatory" ("St. Anthony's Fire").

In April 2017, Regan released his fifth studio album The Meetings of the Waters via independent label Abbey Records under his imprint 'Tsuneni Ai'. The album maintains Regan's traditional folk influences but explores a theme of electronica. "His first album for five years is still a folk record at heart, but one swathed in electronic orchestrations". Perceived by many to be the "Regan's best work since his award winning debut", the album received numerous four-star reviews including: The Guardian, Irish Times, Thank Folk for That, and was nominated for the RTÉ Music Choice Award in 2018. To support the lead single, also titled "The Meetings of the Waters", Regan released a music video starring actor Cillian Murphy.

== In popular culture ==
His single "Be Good or Be Gone" has been used in the television dramas Grey's Anatomy, Nearly Famous, and Skins and "Dogwood Blossom" featured in hit series' This Is England '88 and Normal People. His song "Put A Penny In The Slot" has been offered as an iTunes Free Download of the Week. The Welsh actor Rhys Ifans has a tattoo of Regans' lyrics "Be good or be gone". Ellie Goulding and Andrea Corr have been quoted in the press saying they are fans of Regan's music.

Regan's song "Put a Penny in the Slot" was selected to be included on a special compilation album created by IASCA and FMC in partnership with Culture Ireland to present the gift of music from Ireland to dignitaries the Queen and President Obama and their international press corps travelling with them during their individual visits to Ireland in 2011.

Bon Iver's track "00000 Million" on their album "22, A Million", features a sample of the line "The days have no numbers" from Regan's track "Abacus".

== Awards and honours ==
Regan was nominated for two Meteor Music Awards (Best Male and Best Newcomer) in 2006 and The End of History was nominated for Irish Album of the Year at the Choice Music Prize, and was one of the twelve shortlisted albums for the 2007 Mercury Music Prize. He was nominated for the 2008 Shortlist Prize, the US equivalent of the Mercury Prize.

In 2009, Regan was invited to speak and made an honorary member of the Trinity College Literary Society, the chairman saying "In his music, Mr. Regan has done more than many artists to erode the boundaries between music and literature, with his lyrics always possessing the most beautiful poetry."

== Discography ==
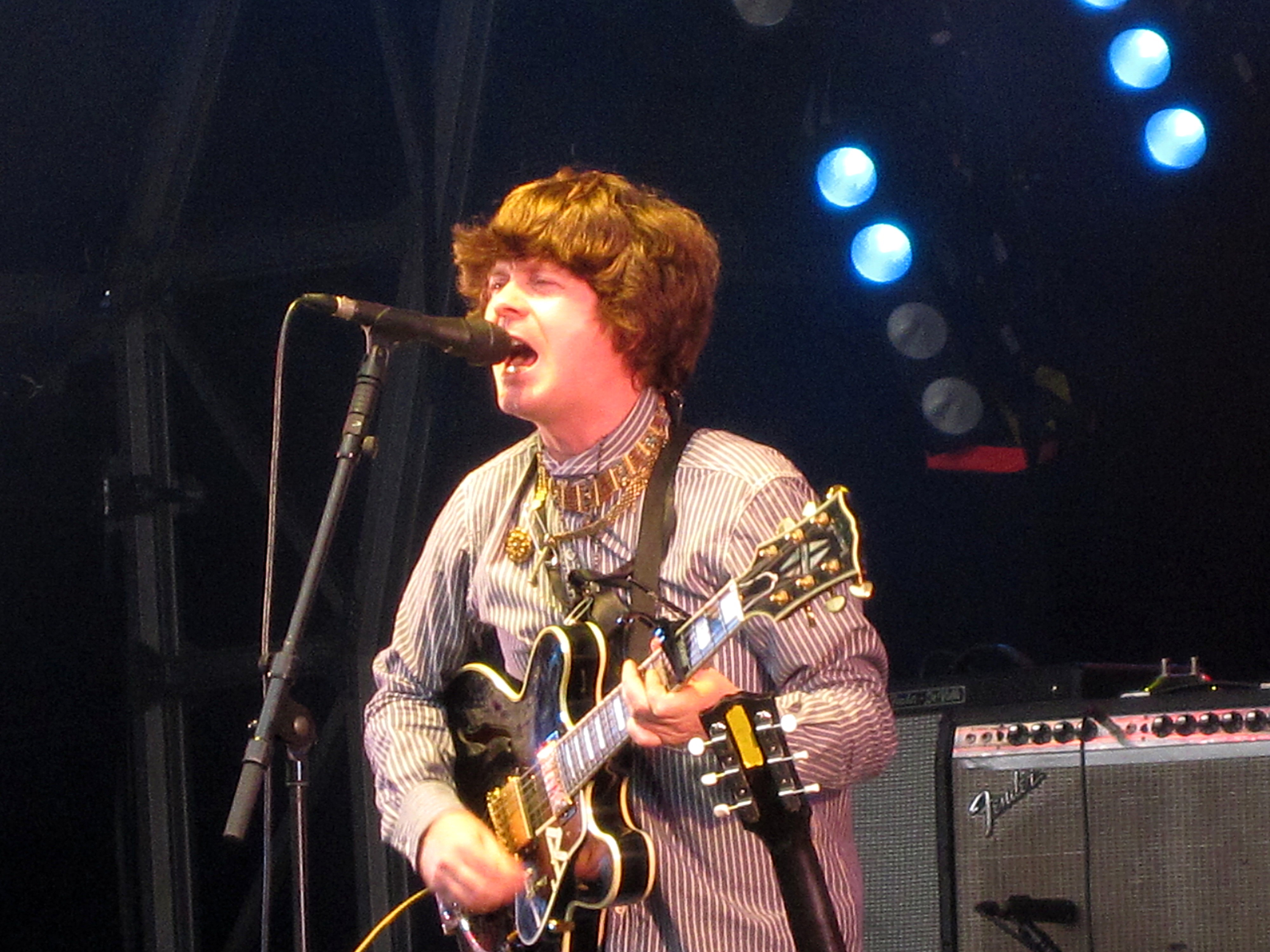
Regan at Summer Sundae in 2010.

- The End of History (2006)
- The Shadow of an Empire (2010)
- 100 Acres of Sycamore (2011)
- The Bunkhouse Vol. 1: Anchor Black Tattoo (2012)
- The Meetings of the Waters (2017)
- Cala (2019)
- O AVALANCHE (2024)
