= Bella Union =

British record label

- Founded: 1997; 29 years ago
- Founder: Simon Raymonde; Robin Guthrie
- Distributor: PIAS
- Genre: Indie rock, alternative rock, folk, experimental, psychedelic
- Country of origin: United Kingdom
- Location: Brighton, England
- Official website: bellaunion.com

Bella Union is a British independent record label founded in 1997 by Simon Raymonde and Robin Guthrie of Cocteau Twins. It is now run solely by Raymonde.

== History ==
After releasing records with 4AD for a large part of their career, Cocteau Twins decided to start up the Bella Union record label in 1997, through which they could release their own work as well as any collaborative efforts. The band had a difficult relationship with 4AD founder Ivo Watts-Russell and also regretted signing with Universal Music Group's Fontana Records.

The band split up not long after, but instead of letting the newly formed label go under, Robin Guthrie, Simon Raymonde and their former manager Fiona Glyn-Jones decided to take charge of it. One of the earliest bands to sign on was the Australian trio Dirty Three, who continue to release under Bella Union. Other early signees include Françoiz Breut and The Czars, who were the first American band signed to the label.

Since 2000, when Guthrie moved to France to concentrate on his own music, Raymonde took the reins at Bella Union.

In 2007, the 10th anniversary celebrations saw Bella Union host a two-night showcase at London's Royal Festival Hall featuring their artists such as Beach House and Midlake, along with guest appearances from Paul Weller and members of Editors. That year, Fionn Regan's debut album was nominated for the Mercury Prize.

The label underwent financial troubles in 2007 and Raymonde considered shutting it down. While in Oslo, Raymonde received a link to Fleet Foxes' Myspace page, who at the time had only released a demo version of "White Winter Hymnal". He immediately expressed interest and had to fight off Sub Pop in order to secure a European distribution contract with the band, which was ultimately agreed to. Fleet Foxes' 2008 self-titled debut became Bella Union's first platinum-selling album in the UK.

The label has subsequently released music by Father John Misty, Beach House, Department of Eagles, Karl Blau, Explosions in the Sky, Fleet Foxes, The Acorn, Mercury Rev, Peter Broderick, PINS, M. Ward, Philip Selway, John Grant, Lawrence Arabia, The Low Anthem, Hannah Cohen, Laura Veirs, The Flaming Lips, Lanterns on the Lake, Inventions, John Tavener, Marissa Nadler, Arc Iris, Clarence Clarity, and Jambinai.

The label won the Independent Record Company Of The Year award at the Music Week Awards, as voted by the UK independent retailers, in 2010, 2012, 2014 and 2016.

In 2012, for the 15th anniversary the label took over the curation of one day at End of the Road Festival.

In 2014, signee John Grant was nominated for a Brit Award. In 2015, Raymonde signed the Yorkshire-born singer Holly Macve, releasing the single "Corner of my Mind". In 2016, artist Father John Misty was also nominated for a BRIT Award. In 2016, following his sold out show at Royal Albert Hall, artist John Grant received a Silver disc for the album Pale Green Ghosts. In 2020 Lanterns on the Lake were shortlisted for the Mercury Prize with their fourth LP Spook the Herd.

In 2024, it was announced that the label's releases are distributed by the distributors Believe worldwide.

== Artists ==
- 2:54
- Aerial
- Abe Vigoda
- Al Brooker
- Alessi's Ark
- Andrew Bird
- Arc Iris
- Art of Fighting
- The Autumns
- Ballet School
- Baloji
- B.C. Camplight
- Beach House
- Bernard+Edith
- Bikini Atoll
- Bonnevill
- Cashier No.9
- Celebration
- Chimes and Bells
- Clarence Clarity
- Conchúr White
- Concrete Knives
- The Czars
- The Dears
- Deary
- Decoder Ring
- Department of Eagles
- Departure Lounge
- Devics
- Dirty Three
- Dog In The Snow
- Doomsquad
- Drab City
- Drowning Craze
- Dustin O'Halloran
- Emmy the Great
- exmagician
- Explosions in the Sky
- Ezra Furman
- Faraway Places
- Father John Misty
- Fiona Brice
- Fionn Regan
- The Flaming Lips
- Fleet Foxes
- Françoiz Breut
- Garlic
- Gwei-Lo
- Hannah Cohen
- Helen Ganya
- Holly Macve
- Horse Thief
- Howling Bells
- I Break Horses
- Icebeing
- Inventions
- The Kissaway Trail
- Jack Dangers
- Jambinai
- Jetscreamer
- John Grant
- John Tavener
- Jonathan Wilson
- Josh Martinez
- Josh T. Pearson
- J. Tillman
- Karl Blau
- Kefaya
- Kid Loco
- Landshapes
- Lanterns on the Lake
- Laura Groves
- Laura Veirs
- Lawrence Arabia
- Liela Moss
- Lift to Experience
- Lisa Dewey
- Lone Wolf
- Lost Horizons
- The Low Anthem
- Lost Horizons
- Lowly
- Mammút
- Mandarin
- Marissa Nadler
- Mazarin
- Mercury Rev
- Midlake
- Mountain Man
- M. Ward
- Mr Ben & the Bens
- Mt.Royal
- My Latest Novel
- My Sad Captains
- Nanaco
- Nell Smith
- Ohbijou
- Our Broken Garden
- Pavo Pavo
- Penelope Isles
- Peter Broderick
- Peter von Poehl
- Phil Selway
- PINS
- Piroshka
- Pom Poko
- Poor Moon
- Promise & The Monster
- Robert Gomez
- Rothko
- Roy Harper
- Russell Mills/Undark
- Silver Moth
- Simon Raymonde
- Sing-Sing
- Sleeping States
- Sneakster
- Snowbird
- Sonikku
- Sophie Jameson
- Stephanie Dosen
- Sumie
- Susanne Sundfør
- The Soft Cavalry
- The Trouble With Templeton
- Van Dyke Parks
- The Venue
- Tim Burgess
- Tiny Ruins
- Treefight for Sunlight
- Veronica Falls
- Vetiver
- The Walkmen
- Wild Nothing
- Will Stratton
- Thousands
- Xiu Xiu
- Xylouris White
- Zun Zun Egui

== See also ==
- List of record labels
