= Harold Budd discography =

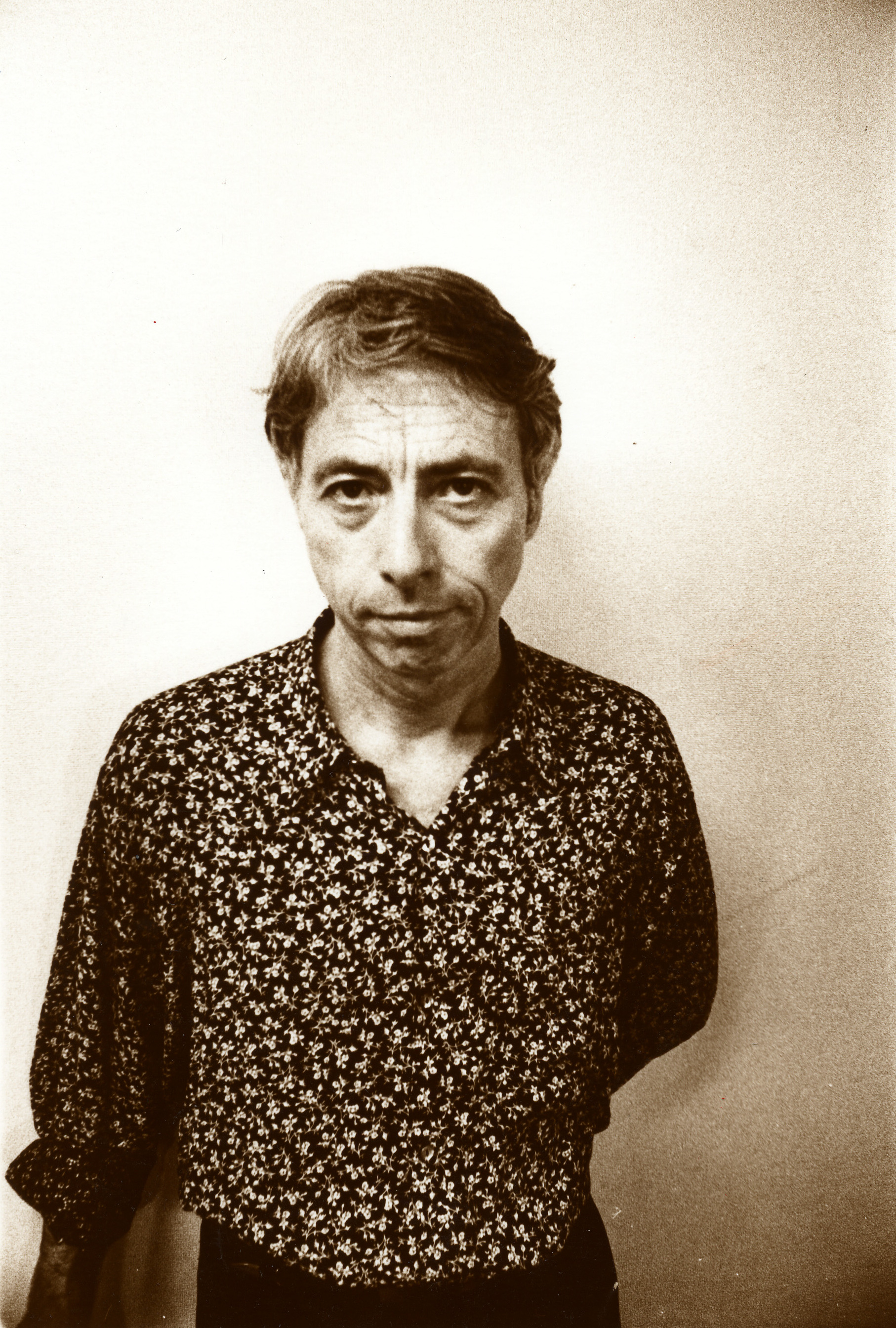
- Harold Budd in Japan Photo: Masao Nakagami
- Studio albums: 15
- Extended plays: 1
- Soundtrack albums: 3
- Live albums: 3
- Compilation albums: 9
- Collaborative albums: 23
- Guest appearances: 2
- Production: 1

Harold Budd (born May 24, 1936 - December 7, 2020) was an American ambient/avant-garde composer and poet. Born in Los Angeles, he was raised in the Mojave Desert.

His discography consists of fifteen studio albums, one EP, three live albums, three soundtrack albums and several collaborations with other artists. His first recording The Oak of the Golden Dreams / Coeur D'Orr was released in 1971, but subsequently Budd didn't release anything until Brian Eno released The Pavilion of Dreams on his Obscure Records label in 1978. Since then he has been a prolific recording artist.

Eno produced his second album The Pavilion of Dreams and they worked together in collaboration on Ambient 2:The Plateaux of Mirror in 1980 and followed it in 1984 with The Pearl. In 1986 he worked with Cocteau Twins on The Moon and the Melodies, and subsequently he has worked frequently with Robin Guthrie on several albums including soundtracks to the films Mysterious Skin and White Bird in a Blizzard. Other frequent collaborators include Hector Zazou, John Foxx and Clive Wright amongst others.

This article contains information related to his recordings.

== Studio albums ==
Year	Title	Label	Catalogue number	Notes
1971	The Oak of the Golden Dreams / Coeur D'Orr	Advance Recordings	FGR 16	
1978	The Pavilion of Dreams	E.G.	EGS 301	Produced by Brian Eno
1981	The Serpent (In Quicksilver)	Cantil	181	Reissued with Abandoned Cities by Opal Records (1989)
1984	Abandoned Cities	Cantil	384	Reissued with The Serpent (In Quicksilver) by Opal Records (1989)
1986	Lovely Thunder	E.G.	EGED 46	Produced by Michael Hoenig, released December 1, 1986
1988	The White Arcades	Opal	9 25766-2	Produced by Brian Eno
September 1, 1988	The Real Dream of Sails			Produced by Brian Eno
1991	By the Dawn's Early Light	Opal	9 26649-2	With Bill Nelson Reissued in 1996 by All Saints Records
1996	Luxa	All Saints Records	ASCD30	Released September 1, 1996
2000	The Room	Atlantic	7567-83382-2	Released: August 15, 2000
2003	La Bella Vista	Shout Factory	DK 30373	Released: October 7. 2003
2004	Avalon Sutra / As Long as I Can Hold My Breath	Samadhi Sound	Sound CD SS004	Produced by Harold Budd; Released: January 18, 2005
2011	In The Mist	Darla	DRL248	Released: September 27, 2011
2012	Bandits of Stature	Darla	DRL262	Released: November 27, 2012
2013	Jane 1-11	Darla	DRL281	Released: June 4, 2013
2014	Jane 12-21	Darla	DRL289	Released: September 9, 2014

== Live albums ==
Year	Title	Label	Catalogue number	Notes
1994	She is a Phantom	New Albion	NA066CD	With Zeitgeist Recorded live at Westminster Church, Minneapolis, November 20, 1993
1995	Agua	Sine	SIN003	Live at the Lanzarote Music Festival, December 1989
2007	Perhaps	Samadhi Sound	SOUND-DL 001	Recorded live at California Institute of Arts December 8, 2006 Released: February 9, 2007

== Compilation albums ==
Year	Title	Label	Catalogue number	Notes
1987	Myths 3: La Nouvelle Sérenité	Sub Rosa	SUB 33003-5	With Gavin Bryars & Jon Hassell Track No. 2 "Cartago Sand Dancing" and No. 3 "Strange Thunder"
1988	Music for Films III	Opal	9 25769-2	Brian Eno's Music for Films series (Track No. 5 "Balthus Bemused by Color") Reissued in 1992 by All Saints Records
1989	The Serpent (In Quicksilver) / Abandoned Cities	Opal	9 26025-2	Released: September 19, 1989; Reissued by All Saints Records (2005)
1997	Unlimited Ambient	Gruppo Futura	(None)	With Nicola Alesini & Pier Luigi Andreoni - track No. 5 "The Valley of Pamir"; With Daniel Lentz and Jessica Karraker - track No. 8 "Beyond This Veil", No. 10 "Interlude 6" and No. 15 "Begin Then Not Know (Reprise)"
1998	Fenceless Night: Selections for Cinema 1980-1998	Polygram	PMP 018	Promotional sampler containing a selection of Budd's work, including solo works and collaborations with Brian Eno, Hector Zazou, Cocteau Twins, Andy Partridge and Daniel Lanois
2006	Compounds + Elements	All Saints Records	HNCD 1510	Released: February 21, 2006; All Saints Records sampler containing several tracks by Budd
2013	Budd Box Sampler	All Saints Records	WASTBOX1PROMO	Promotional sampler containing a 15 track selection of Budd's work for the 7 CD box
2013	Budd Box	All Saints Records	WASTBOX1	Released: December 9, 2013 7 CD box set in a white box containing The Serpent (In Quicksilver), Abandoned Cities, The White Arcades, By The Dawn's Early Light, Music For 3 Pianos, Through The Hill, Luxa
2018	Budd Box	All Saints Records	WASTBOX1X	Released: April 18, 2018 6 CD box set (black box, 2nd edition) containing The Serpent (In Quicksilver), Abandoned Cities, The White Arcades, By The Dawn's Early Light, Music For 3 Pianos, Luxa

== EPs ==
Year	Title	Label	Catalogue number	Notes
1981	The Serpent (in Quicksilver)	Cantil	181	Also released in 1982 by Les Disques Du Crepuscule, Belgium; Reissued with Abandoned Cities by Opal Records (1989)

== Soundtracks ==
Year	Title	Label	Catalogue number	Notes
2005	Mysterious Skin - Music from the Film	Commotion	CR008	Released: May 24, 2005; With Robin Guthrie
2014	White Bird in a Blizzard	Lakeshore	LKS344142	Released: September 23, 2014; With Robin Guthrie
2020	I Know This Much Is True (Music From The HBO Series)	All Saints Records	WAST062DL	Released: Jun 13, 2020

== Collaborative albums ==
Year	Title	Label	Catalogue number	Notes
1980	Ambient 2: The Plateaux of Mirror	E.G.	EGAMB 002	With Brian Eno
1984	The Pearl	E.G.	EGED 37	With Brian Eno and Daniel Lanois
1986	The Moon and the Melodies	4AD	CAD 611	With Simon Raymonde, Robin Guthrie and Elizabeth Fraser
1991	Music for 3 Pianos EP	All Saints Records	ASCD14	Released: January 1, 1991; With Daniel Lentz & Ruben Garcia
1994	Through the Hill	All Saints Records	ASCD21	Released: July 8, 1994; With Andy Partridge
1995	Glyph	Made To Measure	MTM 37	Released: December 12, 1995; With Hector Zazou
1996	Glyph Remixes EP	SSR	SSR 163	Released: June 17, 1996; With Hector Zazou
1998	Walk Into My Voice: American Beat Poetry	Materiali Sonori	MASO CD 90085	With Daniel Lentz & Jessica Karraker
2002	Jah Wobble's Solaris - Live In Concert	30 Hertz Records	30HZCD18	Released: July 27, 2002; With Jah Wobble, Graham Haynes, Jaki Liebezeit & Bill Laswell
2002	Three White Roses and a Budd EP	Twentythree Records	T 016	Released: August 27, 2002; With Fila Brazillia and Bill Nelson
2003	Translucence/Drift Music	Edsel	MEDCD 727	Released: August 26, 2003; With John Foxx
2005	Music for 'Fragments from the Inside'	Sub Rosa	SR239	Recorded live at Palazzo Delle Papesse (Siena, Italy) June 26, 2003 Released: May 17, 2005; With Eraldo Bernocchi
2007	After the Night Falls	Darla	DRL182	Released: July 16, 2007; With Robin Guthrie
2007	Before the Day Breaks	Darla	DRL183	Released: July 16, 2007; With Robin Guthrie
2008	A Song for Lost Blossoms	Darla	DRL198	Released: October 7, 2008; With Clive Wright
2009	Candylion	Darla	DRL221	Released: May 26, 2009; With Clive Wright
2010	Little Windows	Darla	DRL 234	Released: June 8, 2010; With Clive Wright
2011	Bordeaux	Darla	DRL244	Released: February 7, 2011; With Robin Guthrie
2011	Nighthawks, Translucence and Drift Music	Edsel	EDSX3011	Released: June 27, 2011; With John Foxx and Ruben Garcia (on Nighthawks)
2011	Winter Garden	RareNoiseRecords	RNR021	Released: November 29, 2011; With Eraldo Bernocchi and Robin Guthrie
2013	Jane 1-11	Darla	DRL287	CD+DVD with video accompaniment to each album track by visual artist Jane Maru
2015	Nighthawks	Metamatic	META55CD	Released: July 4, 2015; With John Foxx and Ruben Garcia
2015	The Little Glass	Akira Rabelais	(None)	Released: December 3, 2015; With Akira Rabelais
2020	Another Flower	Darla	DRL360	Recorded in Brittany in 2013 Released: December 4, 2020; With Robin Guthrie

== Guest appearances ==
Year	Title	Label	Catalogue number	Notes
1975	Vista	Impulse	ASD 9304	With Marion Brown; Celeste and gong on track No. 5 (also composition of track)
2009	No Line On The Horizon	Mercury	1796037	Released: February 27, 2009; With U2; Instrumentation on track No. 11 "Cedars of Lebanon"

== Production ==
Year	Artist	Album	Notes
1981	Gene Bowen	Bourgeois Magnetic	Production and instrumentation

== Ephemera ==
- The indie rock band Rothko has a song titled "Harold Budd" on their album In the Pulse of An Artery (which uses a sample from Budd's "Boy About 10" from his album By the Dawn's Early Light.)
- Harold Budd and Eugene Bowen contributed the track "Wonder's Edge" to the Cold Blue label compilation.
- The Harold Budd track "Balthus Bemused By Colour" from his album The White Arcades is included as part of the 70 Minutes of Madness DJ mix by Coldcut.
- On saxophonist Marion Brown's 1975 album Vista, Harold Budd plays celeste and gong on the track "Bismillahi 'Rrahmani 'Rrahim", a shorter version of the same composition on Budd's 1978 album The Pavilion of Dreams (which also includes Marion Brown as saxophone soloist).
- In 1961, while in the military, Harold Budd briefly played drums in an Army band with legendary avant-garde saxophonist Albert Ayler.
- The track "Subtext" from Budd's album Translucence with John Foxx features in the film Inside I'm Dancing (Momentum Pictures, June 2004)

== See also ==
- Electronic music
- Experimental music
- List of ambient music artists
