= Robin Guthrie discography =

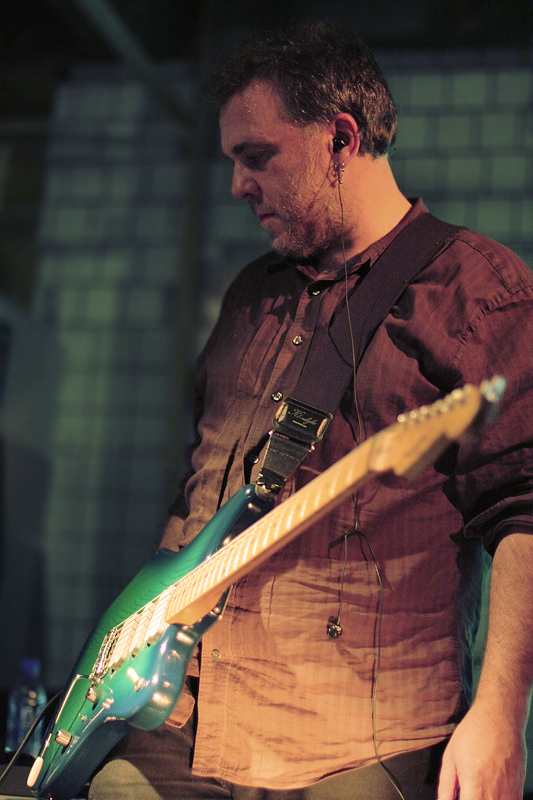
- Studio albums: 5
- Extended plays: 6
- Soundtrack albums: 2
- Compilation albums: 4
- Singles: 1
- With Violet Indiana: 7
- Collaborative albums: 10
- Guest appearances: 16
- Production: 66
- Remixes: 23

Robin Guthrie (born 4 January 1962 in Grangemouth) is a Scottish musician best known as co-founder of the Cocteau Twins. This article contains information related to his recordings and his work as a producer and engineer.

== Studio albums ==
Year	Title	Notes
2003	Imperial: Released: 17 March 2003; Label:Bella Union (BELLACD 48)	
2006	Continental: Released: 16 May 2006; Label: Darla (DRL174)	
2009	Carousel: Released: 15 September 2009; Label: Darla (DRL226)	
2011	Emeralds: Released: 24 May 2011; Label: Rocket Girl (RGIRL77)	
2012	Fortune: Released: 27 November 2012; Label: Darla (DRL258)	
2021	Pearldiving: Released: November 2021; Label: Soleil Apres Minuit	

== Compilation albums ==
Year	Title	Notes
2006	Fractured Beauty: Released: May 2006; Label: Mute Song (MH34)	Track No. 15 "Lost in Monterey"
2006	Little Darla has a Treat for You vol. 24: Endless Summer Edition: Released: June 2006; Label: Darla (DRL175)	Track No. 11 "Argenta"
2009	Little Darla has a Treat for You vol. 27: Eternal Spring Edition: Released: May 2009; Label: Darla (DRL225-2)	Track No. 25 "'The Flight of the Painted Lady"
2011	3... 2... 1... A Rocket Girl Compilation: Released: January 2011; Label: Rocket Girl (RGIRL74)	Track No. 6 "Love Never Dies a Natural Death" and No. 25 "Broken Hearts"

== EPs ==
Year	Title	Notes
2006	Everlasting: Released: 25 July 2006; Label: Darla (DRL180); Label: Rocket Girl (rgirl46)	Four tracks: bordertown; a sigh across the ocean; fountain; everlasting
2006	Waiting for Dawn: Released: July 2006; Label: Rocket Girl (rgirl49)	Four tracks: darkness of the heart; amber; sunshine after midnight; waiting for dawn
2009	Angel Falls: Released: 30 June 2009; Label: Darla (DRL224); Label: Rocket Girl (rgirl59)	Four tracks: camera lucida; love never dies a natural death; red moon rising; delicate
2009	Songs To Help My Children Sleep: Released: 13 October 2009; Label: Darla (DRL228); Label: Rocket Girl (rgirl61)	Four tracks: laughter in the dark; fireflies; white bear in honolulu; misty
2010	Sunflower Stories: Released: 23 February 2010; Label: Darla (DRL233); Label: Rocket Girl (rgirl70)	Four tracks: horse heaven; petals; slightly out of focus; sunflower stories
2024	Atlas: Released: 19 July 2024; Label: Soleil Après Minuit (SM2401CD)	Four tracks: atlas; metropol; without a work; la perigrina
2024	Astoria: Release expected: 8 November 2024; Label: Soleil Après Minuit (SM2402CD)	Four tracks: a most remarkable woman; starting fires; jura; smoulder

== Singles ==
Year	Title	Notes
2006	Flicker: Released: March 2006; Label:	Digital single, exclusively released on Robin Guthrie's MySpace

== Soundtracks ==
Year	Title	Notes
2005	Mysterious Skin – Music from the Film: Released: 24 May 2005; Label: Commotion (CR008)	With Harold Budd; Production and instrumentation
2008	3:19 Bande Originale du Film: Released: July 2008; Label: Darla (DRL213)	
2014	White Bird in a Blizzard – Original Music: Released: October 2014	With Harold Budd

== With Violet Indiana ==
Violet Indiana is a collaboration between Robin Guthrie and Siobhan de Maré (formerly of Mono).

Year	Title	Notes
2000	Choke EP: Released: November 2000; Label: Bella Union (BELLACD 22)	Production and instrumentation
2001	Roulette: Released: April 2001; Label: Bella Union (BELLACD 24)	Production and instrumentation
2001	Special EP: Released: 8 October 2001; Label: Bella Union (BELLACD 26)	Production and instrumentation
2001	Killer Eyes EP: Released: 16 October 2001; Label: Bella Union (BELLACD 28)	Production and instrumentation
2002	Casino: Released: 22 January 2002; Label: Instinct (INS593-2)	Compilation album; Production and instrumentation
2004	Russian Doll: Released: 8 June 2004; Label: Bella Union (BELLACD 66)	Production and instrumentation
2004	Beyond the Furr single: Released: 6 July 2004; Label: Bella Union (BELLACD 67)	Production and instrumentation

== Collaborative albums ==
Year	Title	Notes
1986	The Moon and the Melodies: Released: June 1986; Label: 4AD (CAD 611)	With Harold Budd, Simon Raymonde & Elizabeth Fraser; Production and instrumentation
1999	Fifty-Fifty EP: Released: April 1999; Label: Bella Union (BELLACD 12)	With Sneakster; Remix
2000	Pseudo Nouveau / Fifty-Fifty: Released: March 2000; Label: Shadow Records (SDW076.2)	With Sneakster; Remix on track No. 10 "Fireheart", No. 11 "Stolen Letter" and No. 12 "Kinda Blue"
2004	Ai no Wakusei: Released: June 2004; Label: Victor Entertainment (VICL-61419)	With Atsushi Sakurai; Composed and played all instruments on "Märchen"
2007	After The Night Falls: Released: 16 July 2007; Label: Darla (DRL182)	With Harold Budd; Production and instrumentation
2007	Before The Day Breaks: Released: 16 July 2007; Label: Darla (DRL183)	With Harold Budd; Production and instrumentation
2009	Mirrorball: Released: May 2009; Label: Metamatic (META23CD)	With John Foxx; Instrumentation
2011	Bordeaux: Released: February 2011; Label: Darla (DRL244)	With Harold Budd; Instrumentation
2011	Winter Garden: Released: November 2011; Label: RareNoiseRecords (RNR021)	With Eraldo Bernocchi and Harold Budd; Instrumentation
2020	Another Flower: Released: December 2020; Label: Darla (DRL360)	With Harold Budd; Production and Instrumentation

== Guest appearances ==
Year	Title	Notes
1983	Sixteen Days/Gathering Dust: Released: September 1983; Label: 4AD (BAD 310)	With This Mortal Coil; Guitar on track No. 2 "Song to the Siren"
1984	It'll End in Tears: Released: 1 October 1984; Label: 4AD (CAD 411)	With This Mortal Coil; Guitar on track No. 2 "Song to the Siren", No. 6 "The Last Ray" and No. 11 "Not Me"; Co-written track No. 2 & No. 6
1989	In the Heat of the Night: Released: August 1989; Label: Nightshift (NISHI 208T)	With Kid Congo Powers; Programming on track No. 1 "In the Heat of the Night" and No. 2 "La Historia de un Amour", bass on track No. 2
1994	Afrodisiac: Released: February 1994; Label: Mercury (731451834929)	With The Veldt; Guitar on track No. 15 "Outro (Shaved)"
1996	Found Sound: Released: July 1996; Label: Generic (GENRCD001)	With Spooky; Instrumentation on track No. 9 "Hypo-Allergenic"
1997	Blame Someone Else: Released: October 1997; Label: Bella Union (BELLACD 01)	With Simon Raymonde; Instrumentation on track No. 8 "Muscle and Want"
1998	Undark: Released: January 1998; Label: e:mt (3396)	With Undark; Features Guthrie's "Ziggurat Rhythm"
2000	In the Russet Gold of This Vain Hour: Released: February 2000; Label: Risk Records (RSK-4112)	With The Autumns; Additional guitar
2000	Poison: Released: April 2000; Label: RCA (74321 73098 2)	With Jay-Jay Johanson; Instrumentation on track No. 14 "Far Away"
2000	Trickle: Released: 30 May 2000; Label: Maverick (9362 47709 2)	With Olive; Guitar
2000	Undark One – Strange Familiar: Released: July 2000; Label: Instinct (INS526-2)	With Russell Mills / Undark; Guitar
2006	Solo Cholo: Released: October 2006; Label: New York Night Train (NTNT 001)	With Kid Congo Powers; Compilation album; Programming and bass on track No. 2 "La Historia de un Amour"
2008	Sawtooth EP: Released: February 2008; Label: Vertebrae	With Halou; Guitar
2008	Halou: Released: September 2008; Label: Vertebrae	With Halou; Guitar on track No. 1 "Professional", No. 3 "Evensong" and No. 6 "Seabright"
2008	Halo Inside (Come la Luna): Released: December 2008; Label: Matteite (CD MTTTE 0003-2008)	With Honeychild Coleman; Guitar on track No. 4 "December"
2011	Werkschau: Released: January 2011; Label: BPitch Control (BPC 227)	With Telefon Tel Aviv; Compilation album, track No. 17 "The Sky is Black"; Instrumentation

== Production ==
Year	Artist	Album	Notes
1984	The Wolfgang Press	Scarecrow EP	Production and guitar
1984	The Wolfgang Press	Water EP	Co-production
1984	The Wolfgang Press	Sweatbox EP	Production and engineering
1985	Dif Juz	Extractions	
1985	Felt	Primitive Painters / Cathedral single	Production on track No. 1 "Primitive Painters"
1985	Felt	Ignite the Seven Cannons	
1985	The Wolfgang Press	The Legendary Wolfgang Press and other Tall Stories	Production and engineering
1986	Harold Budd	Lovely Thunder	Mixing on track No. 5 "Flowered Knife Shadows (For Simon Raymonde)"
1986	Felt	The Ballad of the Band EP	Production on track No. 3 "Candles in a Church" and No. 4 "Ferdinand Magellan"
1987	The Gun Club	Mother Juno	
1987	Edwyn Collins	Don't Shilly Shally EP	
1987	Various artists	Lonely Is An Eyesore	Production on track No. 7 "No Motion" by Dif Juz
1987	A R Kane	Lollita EP	
1987	Mory Kanté	Yé ké yé ké EP	Engineering on track No. 1 "Yé ké yé ké (The Afro Acid Remix)"
1987	Felt	Final Resting of the Ark EP	Production on track No. 2 "Autumn", No. 3 "Fire Circles" and No. 5 "Buried Wild Blind"
1988	Harold Budd	The White Arcades	Engineering on track No. 2 "Baltus Bemused By Color" and No. 4 "The Real Dream of Sails
1988	The Gun Club	Breaking Hands EP	
1988	Heavenly Bodies	Rains on Me EP	Recording of track No. 1 "Rains on Me (Extended Mix)" and No. 2 "Rains on Me (Short Version)"
1990	Lush	Mad Love EP	Production and engineering
1990	Chapterhouse	Sunburst EP	Production on track No. 1 "Something More"
1990	Big Hard Excellent Fish	The Imperfect List single	Recording
1990	Various artists	Alvin Lives	Production on track No. 1 "Chirpy Chirpy Cheep Cheep" by Lush
1990	Lush	Gala	Production on track No. 4 "Deluxe", No. 5 "Leaves Me Gold", No. 6 "Downer", No. 7 "Thoughtforms", No. 14 "Hey Hey Helen" and No. 15 "Scarlet (New Version)"
1991	Chapterhouse	Whirlpool	Production on track No. 3 "Autosleeper" and No. 9 "Something More"
1991	Lush	Black Spring EP	
1991	Lush	For Love EP	Production on track No. 1 "For Love"
1992	Lush	Spooky	
1992	Ian McCulloch	Lover Lover Lover EP	Production on track No. 3 "Ribbons & Chains" and No. 4 "Birdy"
1992	Ian McCulloch	Mysterio	Production on track No. 9 "Vibor Blue" and No. 10 "Heaven's Gate"
1992	Various artists	Volume Five	Production and engineering on track No. 4 "Wildfire" by Fuel and track No. 6 "Help Me Lift You Up" by Macbeth, guitar and bass on track No. 6
1994	Fuel	Timeless EP	Production and guitar on track No. 1 "Butterfly Knife" and No. 5 "Wildfire"
1995	Various artists	The Event Horizon Psi	Production, mixing, guitar and atmospheres on track No. 5 "Half Light" by Aether
1997	The Bitter Springs	Absence Makes the Hair Grow Blonder EP	Mixing of track No. 1 "Absence Makes the Hair Grow Blonder" at September Sound
1997	Guy Chadwick	This Strength EP	Production and mixing
1998	Guy Chadwick	Lazy, Soft and Slow	Production and mixing
1998	Yu-Ra	Innocent Time	
1998	Yu-Ra	Beyond The Pale	Production and guitar
1998	Guy Chadwick	You've Really Got a Hold on Me	Production and mixing
1998	Yu-Ra	Snow Doll	
1999	Dif Juz	Soundpool	Production on track No. 9 "No Motion"
1999	Russell Mills & Undark	Pearl & Umbra	Co-mixing and additional guitar
1999	Yu-Ra	Remember EP	Production and mixing
2000	Various artists	Outlandos D'Americas – Tributo a Police	Additional instrumentation and mixing (at September Sound) on track No. 8 "Sol Invisible" by Lucybell
2000	The Wave Room	Love Medicine	Mixing and guitar
2001	Rothko (band)	In The Pulse of an Artery	Mastering
2001	Yu-Ra	Kumo EP	
2001	Lift to Experience	The Texas-Jerusalem Crossroads	Co-mixing
2002	Al Brooker	Quixotic	Mastering
2003	Aeriel	So Warm EP	
2003	Ulan Bator	Nouvel Air	Mixing and mastering
2005	Sophie Barker	Earthbound	Production on three tracks and co-written two of them
2005	Amber Smith	Hello Sun / Blue Eyes Digital single	Mixing on track No. 1 "Hello Sun"
2006	Amber Smith	RePrint	Mixing
2006	Mahogany	Connectivity	Mixing of track No. 3 "Supervitesse (Robin Guthrie Mix)", No. 8 "Renovo", No. 10 "My Bed is My Castle", No. 12 "Supervitesse (Extended Mix)", No. 13 "My Bed is My Castle (feat. Lucy Belle Guthrie)" and No. 14 "Domino Ladder Beta (feat. Robin Guthrie)"
2007	Broaddaylight	The Bell Jar EP	Mastering
2007	Annie Barker	Mountains and Tumult	Production, mixing and instrumentation
2007	Manual	Lost Days, Open Skies And Streaming Tides	Production, mixing and writing on track No. 9 "Marbella"
2007	Apollo Heights	White Music for Black People'	
2008	Resplandor	Pleamar	Production, engineering and mixing, additional guitar and bass on track No. 3 "Raindrops"
2008	Apollo Heights	Everlasting Gobstopper EP	Production on track No. 3 "Angel Heart (Robin Guthrie Version)"
2009	Broaddaylight	Stars Out EP	Mastering
2010	Dark Orange	Clouds, Paperships And Fallen Angels	Mastering
2010	Heligoland	All Your Ships are White	Production and mixing
2011	Annie Barker	... For a Better Place	Production and guitar
2011	Sealight	Dead Letters EP	Mixing and mastering
2012	Heligoland	Bethmale EP	Mixing and mastering
2013	Broaddaylight	Anniversaries and Reunions	Mastering

== Remixes ==
Year	Artist	Album	Notes
1988	Heavenly Bodies	Celestial	Remix on track No. 14 "Rains on Me (Robin Guthrie Remix)"
1989	A R Kane	Rem'i'xes	Remix on track No. 1 "Miles Apart", No. 3 "Crack Up" and No. 6 "Crack Up (Space Mix)"
1990	The Primitives	You are the Way EP	Remix on track No. 3 "You are the Way (September Mix)"
1992	Candyland	Rainbow EP	Remix on track No. 1 "Rainbow (E-Bow Mix)"
1993	Peace Together / Therapy?	Be Still EP	Remix on track No. 3 "Be Still (Robin Guthrie Remix)"
1994	Medicine	Sounds of Medicine EP	Remix on track No. 1 "Time Baby 3"
1996	Definition of Sound	Child EP	Remix on track No. 3 "Child (Robin Guthrie Mix)"
1996	Frente!	What's Come Over Me? EP	Remix on track No. 2 "What's Come Over Me (Robin Guthrie Mix)"
1998	Autour de Lucie	Immobile	Remix on track No. 14 "Chansons Sans Issue (Remixé)"
1998	Mandalay	Flowers Bloom EP	Remix on track No. 4 "Flowers Bloom (Remixed by Robin Guthrie)"
1998	Superstar	Superstar EP	Remix on track No. 4 "Superstar (Robin Guthrie Melody FM Mix)"
1998	Moonshake	Remixes	Remix on track No. 1 "Cranes (Robin Guthrie Remix)"
1999	Yu-Ra	My Cosmic Wave	Remix on track No. 4 "My Cosmic Wave (Remixed by Robin Guthrie)"
1999	Robin Guthrie	Drifting A.F.U.	Album-length D.J. mix by Guthrie of his own sounds and those of such artists as Labradford, Sonic Youth, Silo, Tony Conrad, Chris & Cosey and Pan American, among others
2005	Flat7	Lost in Blue	Remix on track No. 8 "Smile (Robin Guthrie Remix)"
2007	Colour Kane	Seaside Dream	Remix on track No. 11 "Seaside Dream (Robin Guthrie Mix)"
2007	School of Seven Bells	My Cabal single	Remix on track No. 2 "My Cabal"
2007	Mobiil	Mobiil Remixed	Remix on track No. 9 "Entropic Guinea-pig Miix by Robin Guthrie (Rayons)"
2007	Alsace Lorraine	Dark One	Remix on track No. 15 "The Tall Grass (Robin Guthrie Mix)"
2007	Ulrich Schnauss	Quicksand Memory EP	Remix on track No. 3 "Gone Forever (Robin Guthrie Version)" and No. 4 "On My Own (Robin Guthrie Version)"
2008	Ulrich Schnauss	A Strangely Isolated Place	Remix on track No. 9 "Gone Forever (Robin Guthrie Remix)" and No. 10 "On My Own (Robin Guthrie Remix)"
2011	The Cinema Twin	Black Window single	Remix of track No. 1 "Black Window (Robin Guthrie Version)"
2011	The Cinema Twin	Red Guitar single	Remix of track No. 1 "Red Guitar (Robin Guthrie Version)"
2017	Ummagma	Lama single	Also track 3 on LCD EP
2018	Hatchie	Sure single	
