= Gene Bowen =

American musician

Gene Bowen, also known as Eugene Bowen (born 1950), is a composer, guitarist, pedal steel guitarist, sound designer and vocalist. He has collaborated with and appears on recordings by a number of new music composers, including Harold Budd and Daniel Lentz.

Bowen was working with Harold Budd, James Tenney, Daniel Lentz, Wolfgang Stoerchle and John Baldessari while studying at California Institute of the Arts in the 1970s, where he plays guitar, keyboards, synthesizers and sings. He has contributed to Harold Budd's recordings in one of the landmark albums of the ambient style, Ambient 2: The Plateaux of Mirror (EG, 1980 with Brian Eno), The Serpent (In Quicksilver) (Cantil, 1981), Abandoned Cities (Cantil, 1984), etc. Recently he collaborated with John Densmore – the drummer of The Doors – at Hen House Studios.

== Recordings ==
=== Solo albums ===
- Bourgeois Magnetic (Cantil/Amorfon) (produced by Harold Budd and Gene Bowen)
- Vermilion Sea (Caroline/Gyroscope)

=== Collaborations ===
- Compilation (Cold Blue CB0008) ("Wonder's Edge" with Harold Budd)
- Ambient 2: The Plateaux of Mirror (Virgin) (with Harold Budd and Brian Eno)
- Abandoned Cities (Opal Records 9 26025–2) (with Harold Budd)
- Hen House Studios Anthology #1 Hen House Studios) (with John Densmore)
