= The Serpent (In Quicksilver) =

Studio album by Harold Budd
- Released: 1981
- Recorded: 1980–1981
- Studio: Poiema Studios, Concorde Recording Center, Music Grinder Studios, Speakeasy
- Genre: Ambient
- Length: 19:37
- Label: Cantil Records
- Producer: Harold Budd

Harold Budd chronology
Ambient 2: The Plateaux of Mirror (1980)	The Serpent (In Quicksilver) (1981)	Abandoned Cities (1984)

Professional ratings
Review scores
Source	Rating
AllMusic	2/5 stars
Debaser.it	4/5 stars

The Serpent (In Quicksilver) is a studio album by the American ambient artist Harold Budd. It was released in 1981 on Budd's label Cantil Records.

== Critical reception ==
Microgenre Music's James Krustofski praised the album's use of sparse piano compositions and ambient textures, noting that The Serpent (In Quicksilver) exemplifies Budd's signature minimalist approach. Krustofski highlighted the album’s ethereal quality and contemplative mood, describing it as an intimate listening experience that balances melancholy with serenity, as well as praising Budd’s skill in creating cinematic soundscapes.

== Track listing ==
Side A
No.	Title	Writer(s)	Length
1.	"Afar"	Chas Smith and Harold Budd	2:29
2.	"Wanderer"	Harold Budd	4:12
3.	"Rub with Ashes"	Harold Budd	1:54
Total length:			8:35

Side B
No.	Title	Writer(s)	Length
1.	"Children on the Hill"	Harold Budd	5:02
2.	"Widows Charm"	Harold Budd	1:57
3.	"The Serpent (In Quicksilver)"	Harold Budd	4:03
Total length:			11:02 19:37

== Personnel ==
- Harold Budd – acoustic and electric piano, synthesizer, organ
- Chas Smith – pedal steel guitar
