= Barney Childs =

American composer

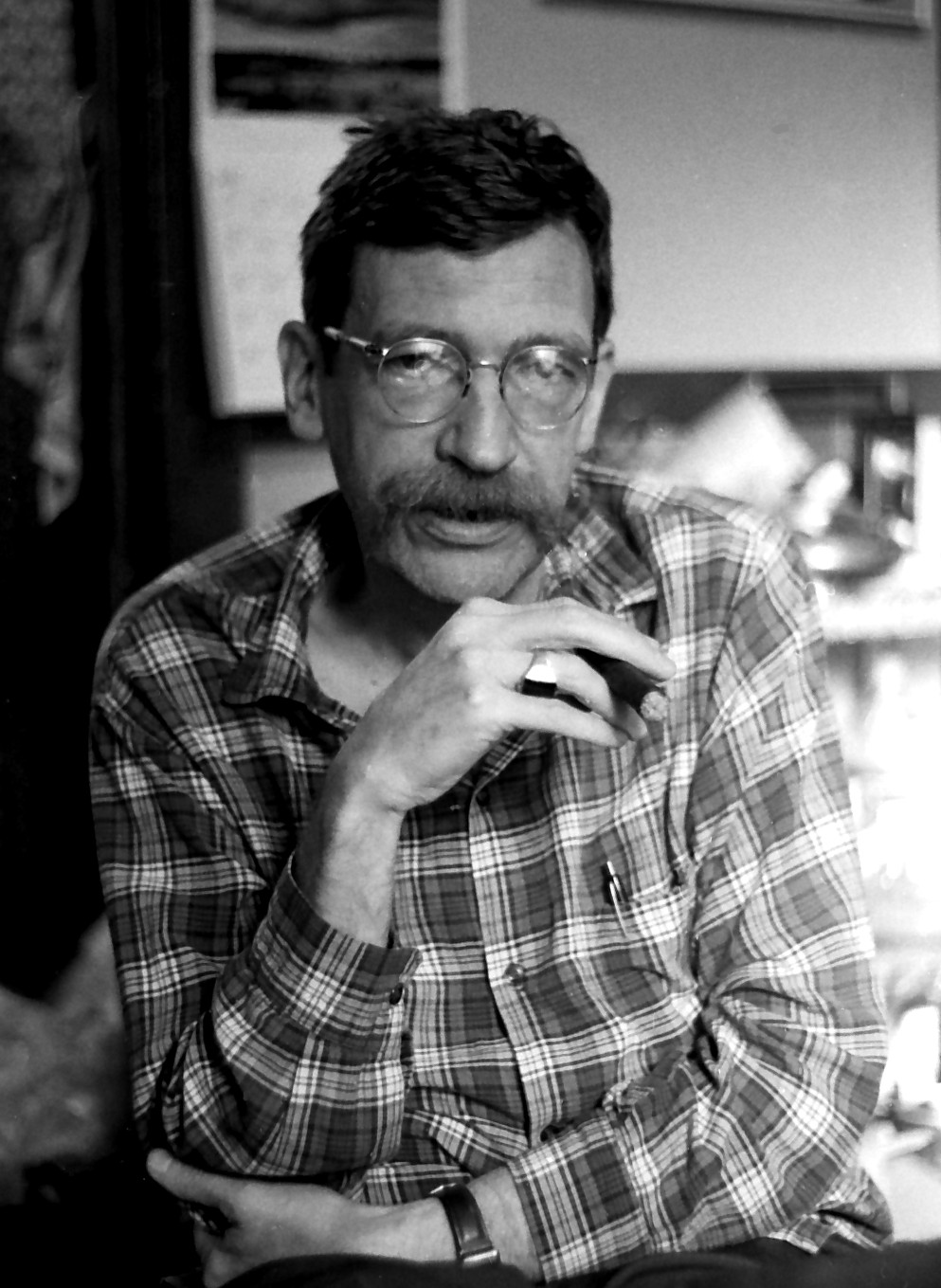
Barney Childs in 1979

Barney Sanford Childs (February 13, 1926 – January 11, 2000) was an American composer and teacher. Born in Spokane, Washington, he taught and composed avant-garde music and literature at universities in the United States and United Kingdom. Childs and Elliott Schwartz edited the 1967 anthology Contemporary Composers on Contemporary Music; a revised and expanded edition, co-edited with Jim Fox, was published in 1998 by Da Capo Press.

== Music ==
He was a musical autodidact till his association in the 1950s with Leonard Ratner and Elliott Carter in New York and with Aaron Copland and Carlos Chavez at Tanglewood (Swift and Attinello 2001). He was associated later with double bass player Bertram Turetzky and clarinet player Phillip Rehfeldt. He wrote several pieces for these and other players, often using extended techniques. Much of his music employs improvisation and indeterminacy (see his "Roachville Project," 1967). However, his influences are diverse and include jazz artists, John Cage, Charles Ives, and Paul Hindemith. Childs won the Koussevitzky Award at Tanglewood in 1954.

== Education and teaching career ==
Trained originally as a literary scholar, Childs studied at Deep Springs College (1943–45), the University of Nevada, Reno (earning a BA in 1949), and Oxford University, where he was a Rhodes Scholar, earning a second BA in 1951 and an MA in 1955. He then returned to the United States where he earned a Ph.D. in English from Stanford University (1961) and remained active as an editor and writer of poetry. He taught English literature at the University of Arizona from 1956 to 1965 (Swift and Attinello 2001), where he was mentor to the young Joseph Byrd, then served as Dean at Deep Springs College from 1965 to 1969. In 1970 he was composer in residence at Wisconsin College Conservatory (Swift and Attinello 2001), and also taught at Goldsmiths, University of London. From 1971 until his death, he was a Fellow of Johnston College, University of Redlands in Redlands, California, where he taught composition and music literature (Swift and Attinello 2001). He also taught literature and creative writing at the Johnston Center for Integrative Studies, located on the University of Redlands campus.

Childs wrote a poetry instruction manual, The Poetry 1 Book, which was published posthumously in 2014.

Childs died in Redlands in 2000, of Parkinson's disease.
