= Music for 'Fragments from the Inside' =

Studio album by Eraldo Bernocchi and Harold Budd
- Released: May 17, 2005
- Genre: Ambient
- Length: 75:18
- Label: Sub Rosa
- Producer: Eraldo Bernocchi

Harold Budd chronology
Avalon Sutra / As Long as I Can Hold My Breath (2005)	Music for 'Fragments from the Inside' (2005)	Mysterious Skin: Music from the Film (2005)

Professional ratings
Review scores
Source	Rating
Allmusic	3.5/5 stars

Music for 'Fragments from the Inside' is an album consisting of music composed and performed by Eraldo Bernocchi and Harold Budd for a video installation by videographer Petulia Mattioli and poet Mara Bressi. Part of the exhibition "Palazzo Delle Liberta" at the Palazzo Delle Papesse Centro Arte Contemporanea (Siena, Italy), the installation combined visual elements with Bernocchi and Budd's compositions. Recorded live in the Palazzo's courtyard on June 26, 2003, the album was first released on CD (Sub Rosa SR239) in 2005 with later reissues available in different formats.

== Track listing ==
1. "One" – 8:11
2. "Two" – 8:32
3. "Three" – 9:40
4. "Four" – 8:56
5. "Five" – 8:28
6. "Six" – 11:08
7. "Seven" – 20:16

== Credits ==
- Performer: Eraldo Bernocchi, Harold Budd, Mara Bressi (poetry)
- Composer: Eraldo Bernocchi, Harold Budd (tracks 2 to 7), Harold Budd (track 1)
- Design, Artwork: Petulia Mattioli
- Mastering: Michael Fossenkemper
- Mixing: Eraldo Bernocchi, Gianpolo Antoni
- Engineer: Francesco Oliveto
- Producer: Eraldo Bernocchi
