= Gerald Strang =

American composer (1908–1983)

Gerald Strang (February 13, 1908 – November 2, 1983) was an American composer who later in life turned to electronic and computer music. Early in his career he worked with Arnold Schoenberg as a teaching assistant and became one of the disciples of Schoenberg's American period.

Strang was born in Claresholm, Alberta and studied at Stanford University and the University of Southern California, where he completed a PhD in 1948. His teachers included Charles Koechlin and Ernst Toch. He was Arnold Schoenberg's teaching assistant at UCLA between 1936 and 1938. In 1967 Strang edited Schoenberg's Fundamentals of Musical Composition for publication.

Strang became a lifelong teacher, at Long Beach City College (1938–58), San Fernando Valley State College (1958–65, where he founded the music department and taught Harold Budd), and California State University, then returning to Long Beach (1965–9) and UCLA (1969–74). In the 1930s he contributed to and (from 1936) acted as the managing editor of the New Music Society of California's New Music journal. During the war he interrupted his musical activities, working as an engineer at the Douglas Aircraft Company. He also worked as a building design consultant and acoustician, consulting on some 25 newly built auditoriums in California and other states.

Until 1960 Strang composed mostly instrumental works, and at the beginning of his career was regarded as one of the early Californian modernists, a group headed by Henry Cowell. Cowell's direct influence is evident in the tone clusters used in his early piano piece Eleven (1931), and in the polyrhythms of Percussion Music (1936). His style was "strongly formal, with a unifying technical idea determining the content". From 1960 he began to focus in on electronic and computer-generated music, frequently working on compositions at Bell Labs in New Jersey, where his series of works under the title Compusition were composed on an IBM 7090 (and later 7094) computer. From 1969 he was lecturer in electronic music as UCLA. His final works for synthesizer were composed for the Synclavier II at Long Beach.

Strang died during open heart surgery in 1983. He was survived by his wife Eileen, a cellist.

== Selected works ==
- Eleven, for piano (1931)
- Mirrorrorrim, palindrome for piano (1931)
- Clarinet Sonatina (1932)
- Clarinet Quintet (1933)
- String Quartet (1934)
- Percussion Music, three players (1935)
- Suite for chamber orchestra (1934–5)
- Intermezzo for orchestra (1936 - 2nd movement of Symphony, below)
- Symphony No. 1 (1942)
- Overland Trail, orchestral overture (1943)
- Symphony No. 2 (1946–7)
- Violin Sonata (1949)
- Concerto Grosso for sextet (1950)
- Three Whitman Excerpts for chorus (1950)
- Violin Concerto (1951)
- Cello Concerto, with woodwind quartet and piano (1951)
- Compusition, series of 10 pieces for computer and tape (1969–72)
- Synthions, series of nine pieces for tape (1969–72)
- Synclavions series of four pieces for synthesizer (1983)
