= Avalon Sutra / As Long as I Can Hold My Breath =

Avalon Sutra / As Long As I Can Hold My Breath

Studio album by Harold Budd
- Released: January 18, 2005
- Genre: Ambient
- Length: 115:25
- Label: Samadhi Sound
- Producer: Harold Budd

Harold Budd chronology
Translucence/Drift Music (2003)	Avalon Sutra / As Long As I Can Hold My Breath (2005)	Music for 'Fragments from the Inside' (2005)

Professional ratings
Review scores
Source	Rating
AllMusic	4.5/5 stars

Avalon Sutra / As Long As I Can Hold My Breath is a double album by Harold Budd. The first disc is titled Avalon Sutra, and the second, a remix from Akira Rabelais, is titled As Long as I Can Hold My Breath. At the time of its release in 2005, it was reported to be his final musical work. However, both Music for 'Fragments from the Inside' and Mysterious Skin - Music from the Film, a collaboration with Robin Guthrie, were released a few months after this album. Further recordings were to follow with the last, "Another Flower" (with Robin Guthrie) recorded in 2013 but only released a few days before his death in December 2020.

== Track listing ==
CD 1 Avalon Sutra

1. "Arabesque 3" (Jon Gibson) – 2:40
2. "It's Steeper near the Roses (For David Sylvian)" – 1:02
3. "L'enfant Perdu" – 2:14
4. "Chrysalis Nu (To Barney's Memory)" – 1:59
5. "Three Faces West (Billy Al Bengston's)" – 2:49
6. "Arabesque 2" (Jon Gibson) 3:02
7. "Little Heart" – 7:40
8. "How Vacantly You Stare at Me" (Jon Gibson) 4:01
9. "A Walk in the Park with Nancy (In Memory)" – 5:55
10. "Rue Casimir Delavigne (For Daniel Lentz)" – 5:28
11. "Arabesque 1" (Jon Gibson) 1:56
12. "Porcelain Ginger" – 2:01
13. "Faraon" – 1:23
14. "As Long as I Can Hold My Breath" – 3:57

CD 2 As Long As I Can Hold My Breath

1. "As Long As I Can Hold My Breath (by Night)" – 69:28

== Personnel ==
- Harold Budd - string arrangements, mixing, keyboards
- Marston Smith - cello (2, 3, 4, 5)
- Peter Kent - violin (2, 3, 4, 5)
- James Acevedo - viola (2,3,4,5)
- Jon Gibson - soprano saxophone, bass flute (1,6,8,11)
- Denis Blackham - mastering
- Michael Coleman - mixing, mastering, recording (1, 14)
- Yuka Fujii - artist Liaison
- Shinya Fujiwara - photography
- Scott Fraser - recording (1, 2, 3, 4, 6, 8, 11)
- James Sitterly - violin (2, 3, 4, 5)
- Akira Rabelais - composer, guitar (As Long As I Can Hold My Breath (by Night))
- David Sylvian - art director
- Chris Bigg - design
