= Jim Fox (composer) =

- Born: Indianapolis, Indiana
- Genres: minimalism, postminimalism, Film score, classical, experimental, electronica, ambient
- Occupations: musician, composer, teacher, record producer, designer
- Years active: Early 1970s–present
- Label: Cold Blue Music
- Website: jimfoxmusic.com

Jim Fox (born 1953 in Indianapolis, Indiana) is an American composer, and also founder, director, producer, and designer of the "small but influential" recording label Cold Blue Music.

His compositions, often for small and unusual instrumentations (e.g., The City the Wind Swept Away is scored for piano, solo strings, two trombones and two bass trombones), are slow, creating tension and interest through unpredictable change within a generally repetitive idiom. Fox studied composition with Phil Winsor at DePaul University, Chicago. He also studied composition as a postgraduate with Barney Childs and taught electronic music, orchestration, and acoustics at the University of Redlands. Along with Childs and Elliott Schwartz, Fox is a co-editor of the 1998 expanded edition of the anthology Contemporary Composers on Contemporary Music, published by Da Capo Press.

Fox’s Cold Blue Music label, from the early 1980s through the present, has championed the works of many composers, often those with West Coast connections of one sort or another, especially the work of John Luther Adams, Peter Garland, Daniel Lentz, Chas Smith, Michael Byron, Michael Jon Fink, and Rick Cox.

Some interviews with Jim Fox:

Textura, June 2021. “Five Questions with Jim Fox” by Ron Schepper
Kathodik (Italy), December 16, 2022, “Interview with Jim Fox, CEO of American Record Label Cold Blue Music” by Marco Paolucci.
New Classic LA, April 30, 2018. “An Interview with Jim Fox of Cold Blue Music” by Cristina Lord.
Mark Alburger: “Foxy Composer-Producer, ” 21st-Century Music, vol.12/1 (2005), 1–5
Barney Childs: “Interview with Jim Fox,” Perspectives of New Music, vol.24/2 (1986), 236–40

== Recorded Compositions ==
- Colorless sky became fog (Cold Blue CB0036)
- The pleasure of being lost (Innova 846)
- Descansos, past (Cold Blue CB0021)
- The City the Wind Swept Away (Cold Blue CB0015)
- Between the Wheels (Cold Blue CB0009)
- Appearance of Red (Cold Blue CB0008)
- Among Simple Shadows (Cold Blue CB0005)
- All Fall Down (CRI 866)
- The Copy of the Drawing (Cold Blue CB0001)
- Last Things (Cold Blue CB0001)
- Ballad of a Gunfighter (filmscore) (Citadel STC 77119)
- Between the Wheels (Raptoria Caam RCD 1001)
- Solo for Single Reed Instrument (Advance Recordings FGR-13)

== See also ==
- List of ambient music artists
