= Elliott Schwartz =

American composer

Elliott Schwartz c. 2006

Elliott Shelling Schwartz (January 19, 1936 – December 7, 2016) was an American composer. A graduate of Columbia University, he was Beckwith Professor Emeritus of music at Bowdoin College joining the faculty in 1964. In 2006, the Library of Congress acquired his papers to make them part of their permanent collection.

He held visiting residencies and fellowships at the University of California (Santa Barbara and San Diego), Ohio State University, Harvard University, Tufts University, Cambridge and Oxford Universities (UK), and the Rockefeller Foundation Study Center (Bellagio, Italy). In 1975 the International Contemporary Organ Music Festival commissioned his work Cycles and Gongs for organ, trumpet, and quadraphonic tape.

Performances of his music include the Cincinnati, Indianapolis and Houston Symphonies, the Minnesota Orchestra, the Kreutzer and Borromeo Quartets, Lincoln Center, Merkin Hall, Symphony Space and the MOMA Summer Garden (NYC); Tanglewood, the Bath Festival (UK); Leningrad Spring (Russia), Gaudeamus Music Week (Netherlands), and the European Youth Orchestra Festival (Denmark).

Recordings of his music can be heard on the New World, CRI, Capstone, Innova, Albany and GM labels. A CD recording of his six chamber concertos has recently been released by BMOP-SOUND. In 2006, Schwartz's 70th birthday was celebrated with concerts, lectures and residencies at the University of Minnesota, the Library of Congress (Washington), Oxford, and the Royal Academy of Music (London).

In addition to his composing, Schwartz also wrote a number of books, critical essays and reviews. His books include:

- Electronic Music: A Listener’s Guide
- Music Since 1945, co-authored with Daniel Godrey
- Contemporary Composers on Contemporary Music, an anthology co-edited with Barney Childs and Jim Fox

He died on December 7, 2016, at the age of 80.
