= The Pearl (album) =

Studio album by Harold Budd and Brian Eno
- Released: August 1984
- Studios: Grant Avenue Studio, Hamilton, Ontario
- Genre: Ambient
- Length: 42:59
- Label: Editions EG
- Producers: Brian Eno; Daniel Lanois

Harold Budd chronology
| Abandoned Cities (1982) | The Pearl (1984) | Lovely Thunder (1986) |

Brian Eno chronology
| Music for Films Volume 2 (1983) | The Pearl (1984) | Thursday Afternoon (1985) |

Harold Budd and Brian Eno chronology
| Ambient 2: The Plateaux of Mirror (1980) | The Pearl (1984) |

The Pearl is the second collaborative studio album by Harold Budd and Brian Eno, released in August 1984 by Editions EG and produced by Eno and Daniel Lanois in Hamilton, Ontario. The Pearl is similar to Budd and Eno's previous collaboration, Ambient 2: The Plateaux of Mirror (1980), consisting mostly of subtly treated piano textures, but with more pronounced electronic treatments and nature recordings. The album has been well received by music critics, and is considered by some as a landmark work in ambient music.

== Production ==
The Pearl was recorded in Hamilton, Ontario in 1984 by Harold Budd, Brian Eno, and Daniel Lanois. The trio shared a house during the recording sessions and worked on the record seven days per week. The music was recorded over two weeks, and then it took 8-12 months to finish production and decide which tracks worked best together. The group had no set approach to working beyond looking for and capturing unique moments; such as "Lost In The Humming Air", on which Budd improvised to humming noises by Brian Eno played on a Yamaha CS-80 and recorded in one take. In the case of "Dark Eyed Sister", Budd recorded it at a small studio beforehand and sent to Eno to develop further; this, according to Budd, was the "extreme version" of how they worked. Eno made most of the decisions on aesthetics, spending hours working solo and recording pieces at different speeds. Pianos in the studio included an acoustic piano, as well as Yamaha and Rhodes electric pianos. For treatments, the group used a Yamaha DX7, CS-80, Casio CT-200, Casiotone 202, a Sequential Circuits Pro One, AMS digital delay, Eventide Harmonizer, and an EMT 250 plate reverb.

== Comparison with Ambient 2 ==
Budd believes both Ambient 2 and The Pearl are similar in terms of sounds and timbres, and those similarities were conceived even during the onset of production. The former album was produced effortlessly, and the duo thought they could produce similar music again with ease. However, production on The Pearl was more challenging. Budd attributed this to naivety as a musical duo for Ambient 2, and explained that their musical language had matured since then, making production more difficult for The Pearl. In this sense, Budd believes The Pearl is more "cohesive" and "focused" than Ambient 2. He feels the conflicting emotions and "artful confusion" in the music make it more complicated and therefore more interesting to listen to.

== Critical reception ==
Professional ratings
Review scores
| Source | Rating |
|---|---|
| AllMusic | 4.5/5 stars |
| Robert Christgau | A− |
| Tom Hull – on the Web | B+ |

Contemporary reviews were positive. Electronics & Music Maker felt The Pearl had more unity than Ambient 2, and enjoyed the peculiar mix of Eno's melancholia and Budd's optimism. Sound on Sound described how the album generates oceanic imagery, such as galleons at the bottom of the sea, waves on a deserted beach, and fish swimming silently.

Retrospective reviews have also been positive. Ned Raggett, writing for AllMusic, stated that "The Pearl is so ridiculously good it instantly shows up much of the mainstream new age as the gloopy schlock that it often is". Robert Christgau wrote that "These eleven pieces are more circumspect and detailed, and while they do slip into decoration they're the most intellectually gratifying (and emotionally engaging) music Eno's put his name on since his first Jon Hassell LP". A more critical review from Uncut described The Pearl the as "overly tasteful abstraction that eventually proves tedious" and a decorative, "musical equivalent of a lava lamp".

Ambient 2 and The Pearl are often discussed together by critics in retrospect as landmark works in ambient and both Eno and Budd's repertoire. In 2014, The Guardian wrote that the albums earned them the title "godfathers of ambient". All About Jazz called the albums "some of the most beautiful music to come out of the early days of the genre". Q wrote that The Pearl built upon the sounds in Ambient 2, and described it as "slow motion cocktail jazz through a padded wall and earmuffs" Pitchfork described Budd and Eno's collaborations as evoking tension "between gentleness and threat, between intimacy and uncertainty, between the thrill of a hint and the human desire to see the whole picture".

== Track listing ==
All tracks are written by Brian Eno and Harold Budd.

Side one
| No. | Title | Length |
|---|---|---|
| 1. | "Late October" | 4:42 |
| 2. | "A Stream with Bright Fish" | 3:55 |
| 3. | "The Silver Ball" | 3:23 |
| 4. | "Against the Sky" | 4:46 |
| 5. | "Lost in the Humming Air" | 4:02 |

Side two
| No. | Title | Length |
|---|---|---|
| 1. | "Dark-Eyed Sister" | 4:39 |
| 2. | "Their Memories" | 3:52 |
| 3. | "The Pearl" | 3:08 |
| 4. | "Foreshadowed" | 3:47 |
| 5. | "An Echo of Night" | 2:26 |
| 6. | "Still Return" | 4:19 |
| Total length: | | 42:59 |

== Personnel ==
- Brian Eno – composition, production
- Harold Budd – composition
- Daniel Lanois – production
- Russell Mills – cover art, design
- Christina Birrer – photography
