= The Pavilion of Dreams =

Studio album by Harold Budd
- Released: 1978
- Recorded: November 1976
- Studio: Basing Street Studios, London
- Length: 47:38
- Label: Editions EG
- Producer: Brian Eno

Harold Budd chronology
The Oak of the Golden Dreams / Coeur D'Orr (1970)	The Pavilion of Dreams (1978)	The Plateaux of Mirror (1980)

The Pavilion of Dreams is the second album from minimalist composer Harold Budd. It was produced by Brian Eno. Billed as "an extended cycle of works begun in 1972", it was recorded in 1976 but not released until 1978 on Eno's label Obscure Records. It was later re-released on Editions EG in 1981.

== Reception ==
Professional ratings
Review scores
Source	Rating
AllMusic	3.5/5 stars

AllMusic wrote positively of the album, stating that in "mixing ethereal melodies communicated by voice or saxophone with glissando accompaniment, Harold Budd creates a series of siren songs on The Pavilion of Dreams that shimmer like light reflected on the water's surface."

== Track listing ==
1. "Bismillahi 'Rrahmani 'Rrahim" – 18:23
2. "Two Songs: 1. Let Us Go into the House of the Lord / 2. Butterfly Sunday" – 6:19
3. "Madrigals of the Rose Angel: 1. Rossetti Noise / 2. The Crystal Garden and a Coda" – 14:16
4. "Juno" – 8:18

== Personnel ==
- Marion Brown – alto saxophone
- Harold Budd – piano, voice
- Maggie Thomas – harp
- Richard Bernas – celeste
- Gavin Bryars – glockenspiel, voice
- Jo Julian – marimba, vibraphone, voice
- Michael Nyman – marimba, voice
- John White – marimba, percussion, voice
- Howard Rees – marimba, vibraphone
- Nigel Shipway – percussion
- Richard Bernas – piano
- Brian Eno – voice
- Lynda Richardson, Margaret Cable, Lesley Reid, Ursula Connors, Alison MacGregor, Muriel Dickinson – chorus
