= Before the Day Breaks =

Studio album by Harold Budd and Robin Guthrie
- Released: 16 July 2007
- Genre: Ambient, electronica
- Length: 43:12
- Label: Darla Records
- Producer: Robin Guthrie, Harold Budd

Harold Budd chronology
After the Night Falls (2007)	Before the Day Breaks (2007)	A Song for Lost Blossoms (2008)

Professional ratings
Review scores
Source	Rating
AllMusic	4/5 stars

Before the Day Breaks is a 2007 collaborative album from Robin Guthrie, formerly of the Cocteau Twins, and ambient artist Harold Budd. It was released, as a matched CD, on the same day as After the Night Falls, also by Guthrie and Budd.

In December 2007, American webzine Somewhere Cold ranked Before the Day Breaks No. 6 on their 2007 Somewhere Cold Awards Hall of Fame.

== Track listing ==
1. "How Close Your Soul" – 7:46
2. "Formless Path" – 4:23
3. "Minute a Day No More" – 5:21
4. "She Is My Weakness" – 3:41
5. "Outside Silence" – 4:25
6. "Hidden Message" – 4:48
7. "I Returned Her Glance" – 3:43
8. "My Monochrome Vision" – 4:44
9. "Turn On the Moon" – 4:21
