= White Bird in a Blizzard =

2014 film by Gregg Araki

- Film poster
- Directed by: Gregg Araki
- Screenplay by: Gregg Araki
- Based on: White Bird in a Blizzard by Laura Kasischke
- Produced by: Gregg Araki; Pascal Caucheteux; Sebastien Lemercier
- Starring: Shailene Woodley; Eva Green; Christopher Meloni; Shiloh Fernandez; Gabourey Sidibe; Thomas Jane; Dale Dickey; Mark Indelicato; Sheryl Lee; Angela Bassett
- Cinematography: Sandra Valde-Hansen
- Edited by: Gregg Araki
- Music by: Harold Budd; Robin Guthrie
- Production companies: Why Not Productions; Desperate Pictures; Wild Bunch; Orange Studio
- Distributed by: BAC Films (France); Magnolia Pictures (United States)
- Release dates: January 20, 2014 (Sundance); October 24, 2014
- Running time: 91 minutes
- Countries: France; United States
- Language: English
- Box office: $378,300

White Bird in a Blizzard is a 2014 drama film co-produced, written, directed and edited by Gregg Araki and starring Shailene Woodley, Eva Green, Christopher Meloni, and Angela Bassett. Based on the novel of the same name by Laura Kasischke, the film follows several years in the life of teenager Katrina "Kat" Connors (Woodley), beginning on the day her mother, Eve (Green), disappeared and the effect this event has on her and the people of her life, frequently alternating between the present time and flashbacks. The film premiered at the 2014 Sundance Film Festival on January 20, 2014, before being given a limited theatrical release on October 24, 2014.

== Plot ==
In 1988, 17-year-old Katrina "Kat" Connors' beautiful but mercurial mother, Eve, disappears without a trace. The story weaves back-and-forth with flashbacks of Eve's past life and the present day.

In her past, Eve was a thrill-seeking party girl who gradually changed into a domesticated housewife after marrying Kat's father, Brock, an ordinary man who leads an uneventful life. While Kat explores her blossoming sexuality with her handsome but dim-witted neighbor and schoolmate, Phil, Eve struggles to deal with aging and quenching her youthful wildness. She tries to be sexy when Brock is away, even luring Phil's attention. After Eve disappears, Kat deals with her abandonment without much issue and occasionally releases her own wild side, including by seducing Detective Scieziesciez, who is investigating Eve's disappearance. In 1991, Kat returns home from college for spring break and seems unfazed to learn that her father is in a relationship with a co-worker.

Scieziesciez informs Kat of his suspicions that Brock might have killed Eve after catching her cheating, a theory which Kat quickly dismisses. When she mentions it to her friends Beth and Mickey, they remind her that she also dismissed them when they suggested the same theory to her three years prior. Kat suspects Phil of having slept with Eve and confronts him the night before she is to return to college. Phil angrily denies this, and tells her that Brock knows where Eve is.

Kat experiences recurring dreams where Eve is stranded in the snow. One night, she starts to open Brock's locked basement freezer, but is interrupted when he enters. She asks him about Eve's whereabouts, but he claims to have no knowledge of them. Believing him, Kat bids him goodbye and tearfully boards her flight. Shortly after she leaves, Brock goes to a bar, where he drunkenly confesses to Eve's murder and reveals that he moved Eve's body from the freezer to a nearby hill the night before Kat opened it. He is arrested and hangs himself with a sheet in his jail cell. Eve's body is later found, melted after being frozen for so long.

The film ends on the night of Eve's death, whereupon she returns home from shopping to find Brock and Phil in bed together. Phil flees while an incredulous Eve begins hysterically laughing. Humiliated, Brock begs her to stop, but she continues laughing until he grabs her by the throat and strangles her to death.

== Cast ==
- Shailene Woodley as Katrina "Kat" Connors
  - Ava Acres as 8-year-old Kat
- Eva Green as Eve Connors
- Christopher Meloni as Brock Connors
- Shiloh Fernandez as Phil
- Gabourey Sidibe as Beth
- Thomas Jane as Detective Scieziesciez
- Angela Bassett as Dr. Thaler
- Dale Dickey as Mrs. Hillman
- Mark Indelicato as Mickey
- Jacob Artist as Oliver
- Sheryl Lee as May

== Production ==
The casting of Woodley, Green, Fernandez and Sidibe was initially announced in November 2012. The additional castings of Bassett and Dickey were announced later that same month.

While promoting the film in interviews, Woodley defended her nude scenes, stating that they were “very truthful.”

== Reception ==
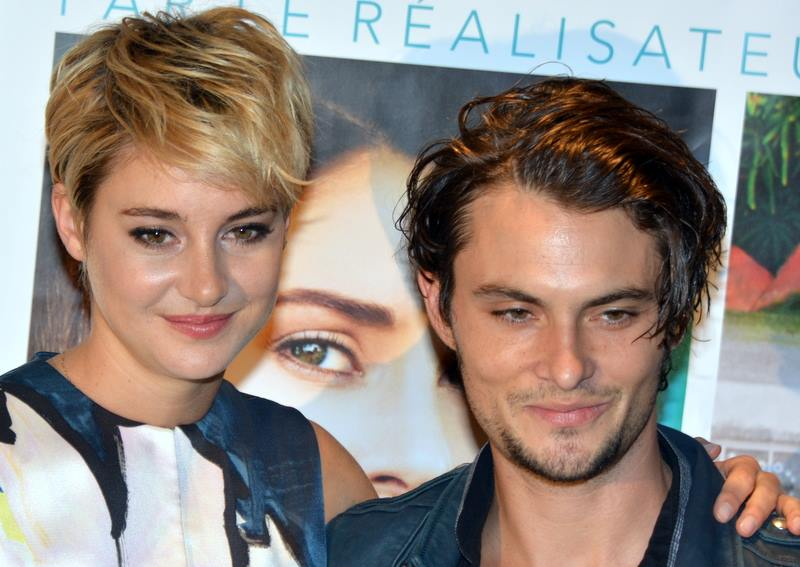
Shailene Woodley and Shiloh Fernandez in Paris at the film's French premiere.

=== Box office ===
The film opened in the United States in a limited release on October 24, 2014, in 4 theaters and grossed $6,302 with an average of $1,576 per theater and ranked #80 at the box office. After 7 weeks in theaters the film earned $33,821 domestically and $344,479 internationally for a total of $378,300.

=== Critical response ===
On Rotten Tomatoes, a review aggregator, the film has a score of 55% based on 92 reviews, with an average rating of 5.6/10. The critical consensus states: "Part suburban thriller, part sexual awakening drama – and fully convincing as neither – White Bird in a Blizzard rests a little too heavily on Shailene Woodley's typically superlative work." The film also has a score of 51 out of 100 on Metacritic based on 27 critics, indicating "mixed or average reviews."

Kansas City Star reporter Jocelyn Noveck said, "It all comes down to a doozy of a plot twist, and it's enjoyably shocking. But at the end you're still left shaking your head, feeling lost, wishing there was something tangible to hold on to — perhaps a bit like being trapped in a snow globe...Two stars out of four."
