= By the Dawn's Early Light =

Studio album by Harold Budd
- Released: January 1, 1991
- Genre: Ambient
- Length: 53:12
- Label: All Saints Records

Harold Budd chronology
The White Arcades (1988)	By the Dawn's Early Light (1991)	Music for 3 Pianos (1992)

Professional ratings
Review scores
Source	Rating
Allmusic	3/5 stars

By the Dawn's Early Light is an album by composer Harold Budd. It was first released in 1991 by the Warner Bros. and WEA record labels, and subsequently re-released with new cover art in 2006 by All Saints Records. The album is typical of Budd's signature minimalist style, and features several short poems, each read by Budd himself.

== Track listing ==
1. "Aztec Hotel (Poem)" – 1:33
2. "Boy About 10" – 4:59
3. "Arcadia" – 2:00
4. "Dead Horse Alive with Flies" – 3:40
5. "The Photo of Santiago McKinn" – 6:55
6. "The Corpse at the Shooting Gallery" – 2:57
7. "Albion Farewell" – 2:38
8. "Distant Lights of Olancha Recede (Poem)" – 1:27
9. "Down the Slopes to the Meadow" – 7:39
10. "She Dances by the Light of the Silvery Moon" – 2:12
11. "Blind Bird" – 2:03
12. "Saint's Name Spoken" – 3:59
13. "The Place of Dead Roads" – 4:50
14. "A Child in a Sylvan Field" – 3:36
15. "Boy About 10 (Poem)" – 1:18
16. "Wings (Poem)" – 0:37
17. "Advent (Poem)" – 0:49

Additional track from release by Opal/Warner Bros Records

17. "No Name (Poem)" – 0:55
