= The Room (album) =

Studio album by Harold Budd
- Released: August 15, 2000
- Genre: Ambient
- Length: 54:52
- Label: Atlantic
- Producer: Harold Budd

Harold Budd chronology
Fenceless Night: Selections for Cinema 1980-1998 (1998)	The Room (2000)	Three White Roses and a Budd (2002)

Professional ratings
Review scores
Source	Rating
AllMusic	4/5 stars
The Baltimore Sun	3/4 stars
The Encyclopedia of Popular Music	3/5 stars
Los Angeles Times	3.5/4 stars

The Room is an album composed and performed by Harold Budd, released in 2000.

== Production ==
Budd constructed The Room as a concept album about thematically different areas. Budd produced the album.

== Critical reception ==
AllMusic wrote that "though some of the synthesizer textures verge on a little too much new age sweetness, [Budd's] piano is always a thing of tranquil beauty, veiled in layers of eerie echo, evoking a half-remembered dream." The Guardian wrote: "There was a time when every other musician with a synthesizer, a piano and a Portastudio was trying to make ambient statements like this, but the financial superstructure (not to mention the potential yuppie consumers) faded fast after Black Friday. Budd's choice of timbres and melodies, which manage to be pretty without insulting the intelligence, mean that the ambient legacy is in safe hands." CMJ New Music Monthly deemed the album "remarkably vibrant."

== Track listing ==
1. "The Room of Ancillary Dreams" – 6:08
2. "The Room of Oracles" – 4:46
3. "The Room of Stairs" – 5:21
4. "The Room of Corners" – 5:05
5. "The Room Alight" – 4:41
6. "The Candied Room" – 3:41
7. "The Room of Mirrors" – 7:07
8. "The Room Obscured" – 1:03
9. "The Room of Forgotten Children" – 2:16
10. "The Room of Accidental Geometry" – 3:25
11. "The Room of Secondary Light" – 4:38
12. "The Flowered Room" – 4:26
13. "The Room" – 2:15
