= Through the Hill =

Studio album by Andy Partridge and Harold Budd
- Released: 1994-07-08 (Original) 2003-11-25 (Re-Release); 2005-08-30 (Re-Release) 2013-11-__ (Re-Release 2 x LP)
- Genre: Ambient
- Length: 57:39
- Labels: All Saints Records, Gyroscope (1994); Hannibal (2005)

Harold Budd chronology
She Is a Phantom (1994)	Through the Hill (1994)	Glyph (1995)

Reissue cover

Professional ratings
Review scores
Source	Rating
AllMusic	3/5 stars

Through the Hill is an album composed and performed by Andy Partridge and Harold Budd.

== Track listing ==
- Prelude

1. "Hand 19" – 1:22

- Geography

2. "Through the Hill" – 4:07
3. "Great Valley of Gongs" – 3:09
4. "Western Island of Apples" – 3:05
5. "Anima Mundi" – 4:46

- Interlude

6. "Hand 20" – 3:02

- Structures

7. "The Place of Odd Glances" – 3:19
8. "Well for the Sweat of the Moon" – 3:26
9. "Tenochtitlan's Numberless Bridges" – 3:57
10. "Ceramic Avenue" – 5:20

- Interlude

11. "Hand 21" – 1:55

- Artifacts

12. "Missing Pieces to the Game of Salt and Onyx" – 6:01
13. "Mantle of Peacock Bones" – 2:09
14. "Bronze Coins Showing Genitals" - 4:20
15. "Bearded Aphrodite" - 2:36

- Postlude

16. "Hand 22" - 2:25

- Bonus Track (On 2005 Re-Release)

17. "Bruegel" - 2:40

- Bonus Tracks (On 2013 Amazon Music and 2013 Nov 2xLP Re-Issue)

17. "Bosch" - 1:49
18. "Bruegel" - 2:54
