= Monument House =

The Monument, Schweitzer House, or Monument House
- The Monument House, by JPR January 2002

General information
- Architectural style: Post modern, other
- Location: United States
- Construction started: 1989
- Completed: 1990
- Cost: $165,000.00

Design and construction
- Architect: Josh Schweitzer

The Monument House, also known as Schweitzer House, or just The Monument (constructed 1989–1990) was designed by architect Josh Schweitzer, as a retreat for close friends and family, which included Mary Sue Milliken and Susan Feniger. It is just outside the Joshua Tree National Park, in the U.S. state of California.

The dwelling is modern, unique in design, and has been featured in numerous architectural books and magazines. The cubic shape, with irregular quadrilateral openings, mirrors the surrounding landscape, which is dominated by fragmented monzogranite boulders. Building colors also reflect the surroundings with an orange gazebo, a color found on some boulders and flowers. A drab olive from shrubs and cacti and blue colors mimic distant ridgelines and the sky.

== Notes and references ==
Side from hillside above dwelling.

- Modern American Houses by Clifford A. Pearson
- Architectural Record, Record House 1990. Mid April issue 1990. cover & p. 63-68
- Gandee, Charles. The New Frontier: A Pioneering Design Led Six Friends to a Valley in the High Desert. Photographs by Timothy Hursley.
- House & Garden, June 1990, p. 119-125.
