= After the Night Falls =

Studio album by Harold Budd and Robin Guthrie
- Released: 16 July 2007
- Genre: Ambient, electronica
- Length: 38:16
- Label: Darla Records
- Producer: Robin Guthrie, Harold Budd

Harold Budd chronology
| Perhaps (2007) | After the Night Falls (2007) | Before the Day Breaks (2007) |

Professional ratings
Review scores
| Source | Rating |
|---|---|
| AllMusic | 4/5 stars |

After The Night Falls is a 2007 collaborative album from Robin Guthrie, formerly of the Cocteau Twins and ambient artist Harold Budd. It was released, as a matched CD, on the same day as Before the Day Breaks, also by Guthrie and Budd.

== Track listing ==
1. "How Distant Your Heart" – 4:03
2. "Avenue of Shapes" – 3:27
3. "Seven Thousand Sunny Years" – 6:19
4. "She Is My Strength" – 2:52
5. "Inside, a Golden Echo" – 3:24
6. "Open Book" – 5:17
7. "And Then I Turned Away" – 3:30
8. "The Girl With Colorful Thoughts" – 4:26
9. "Turn Off the Sun" – 4:58
