= Ambient 2: The Plateaux of Mirror =

Studio album by Harold Budd and Brian Eno
- Released: April 1980
- Recorded: 1979
- Studio: Grant Avenue Studio, Hamilton, Ontario
- Genre: Ambient
- Length: 39:30
- Label: E.G.
- Producer: Brian Eno

Harold Budd and Brian Eno chronology
| The Pavilion of Dreams (1978) | Ambient 2: The Plateaux of Mirror (1980) | The Pearl (1984) |

Brian Eno chronology
| Ambient 1: Music for Airports (1979) | Ambient 2: The Plateaux of Mirror (1980) | Fourth World, Vol. 1: Possible Musics (1980) |

Ambient 2: The Plateaux of Mirror is a 1980 studio album by Harold Budd and Brian Eno. A work of ambient music, it is the second installment of Eno's Ambient series, which began in 1978 with Ambient 1: Music for Airports. Ambient 2 consists mainly of minimalist composer Budd playing improvisational piano in soundscapes produced by Eno. The album received positive reviews and led to Budd and Eno collaborating again for the sonically similar The Pearl (1984).

== Background and production ==
Harold Budd and Brian Eno had previously worked together on The Pavilion of Dreams (1978) after British composer Gavin Bryars introduced the pair. After returning from a four-month trip to Thailand, Eno began work with Budd on Ambient 2. The album was recorded in Hamilton, Ontario.

Eno explained production as mostly Budd improvising "in a sound-world [Eno] had created". The music was improvised by Budd while Eno managed the "sound". He would set up the piano to be treated with electronic equipment, and then Budd would improvise with it. Budd was able to listen to the processed sound as he played the acoustic pianos in the studio. He discovered, as he played, how to best manipulate the treated piano, finding the best register and speed to play at, and how to make it resonate. Budd described using choral and delay effects in extreme unintended ways: "you're hearing the effect as the sound itself, rather than using them to industry standards". The project was the first time Budd experienced the concept of using the studio as a compositional tool.

According to Budd, production came "so quickly and so easily that it was kind of a phantom, you thought you could do thirty more of those with the same joie de vivre". However, after completing their later collaboration The Pearl (1984), Budd came to think of The Pearl as more "focused", and Ambient 2 as a naive album.

== Critical reception ==
Professional ratings
Review scores
| Source | Rating |
|---|---|
| AllMusic | 4/5 stars |
| The Austin Chronicle | 4/5 stars |
| The Encyclopedia of Popular Music | 4/5 stars |
| Pitchfork | 8.4/10 |
| Spin Alternative Record Guide | 6/10 |
| Tom Hull – on the Web | B+ |

AllMusic reviewer Dave Connolly described Ambient 2 as "a lovely, evocative work". Pitchfork's Liam Singer wrote, "The Plateaux matches Eno's other ambient albums in its moments of deep beauty, though it does little to mute the human presence. One gets the feeling that Harold Budd was after something slightly different from Eno, as his playing seems a bit busy under the concept at hand. Still, left on in the background, Plateaux is a light-filled album that accomplishes the goal of transforming its environment." Mojo wrote that Budd's "mix of lyricism and minimalism" contrasted well with Eno's style, as if they were destined to collaborate. The Austin Chronicle wrote that Eno's treatments "refract" Budd's melodies, creating a prism-like effect and resulting in "a panacea for a dim day or the conduit for a floodgate of buried sensations".

In a more critical review, PopMatters wrote that Ambient 2 is "intentionally banal...featureless... not designed to engage the listener on anything but a subconscious level. Trying to pay the music your full attention will result in nothing but frustration: nothing's really there." Stylus wrote that the listener can gather a sense that Eno and Budd were not able to settle on a style for the album.

== Track listing ==
All tracks composed by Brian Eno and Harold Budd except "Steal Away" by Budd and Eugene Bowen.

Side one
| No. | Title | Length |
|---|---|---|
| 1. | "First Light" | 6:59 |
| 2. | "Steal Away" | 1:29 |
| 3. | "The Plateaux of Mirror" | 4:10 |
| 4. | "Above Chiangmai" | 2:49 |
| 5. | "An Arc of Doves" | 6:22 |

Side two
| No. | Title | Length |
|---|---|---|
| 1. | "Not Yet Remembered" | 3:50 |
| 2. | "The Chill Air" | 2:13 |
| 3. | "Among Fields of Crystal" | 3:24 |
| 4. | "Wind in Lonely Fences" | 3:57 |
| 5. | "Failing Light" | 4:17 |
| Total length: | | 39:30 |

== Personnel ==
- Harold Budd – acoustic and electric piano
- Brian Eno – other instruments, treatments, production, cover art
- Bob Lanois, Daniel Lanois, Eugene Bowen, Roddy Hui – special thanks
