= Lovely Thunder =

Studio album by Harold Budd
- Released: December 1, 1986
- Recorded: 1986, at Metamusic Productions (L.A.), except track 5, at Cocteau Twins Studios (London, England)
- Genre: Ambient
- Length: 47:31
- Label: Editions EG
- Producers: Harold Budd, Michael Hoenig

Harold Budd chronology
The Pearl (1984)	Lovely Thunder (1986)	The Moon and the Melodies (1986)

Professional ratings
Review scores
Source	Rating
AllMusic	4.5/5 stars
The Encyclopedia of Popular Music	3/5 stars

Lovely Thunder is a studio album by the American ambient artist Harold Budd. It was released in 1986 on E.G. Records. The vinyl release did not include "Valse pour le fin du temps".

== Track listing ==
1. "The Gunfighter" – 3:18
2. "Sandtreader" – 5:33
3. "Ice Floes in Eden" – 3:28
4. "Olancha Farewell" – 2:18
5. "Flowered Knife Shadows" – 7:15
6. "Valse pour le fin du temps" – 4:50
7. "Gypsy Violin" – 20:49

== Production ==
- Arranged by Harold Budd
- Produced & mixed by Harold Budd & Michael Hoenig, with track 5 mixed by Robin Guthrie
- Engineered by Harold Budd, Michael Hoenig & Simon Raymonde
