= Daniel Lentz =

American classical composer (1942–2025)

- Born: March 10, 1942; Latrobe, Pennsylvania, US
- Died: July 25, 2025 (aged 83) Santa Barbara, California, US
- Genres: Contemporary classical; Ambient; Electronic; Minimalism
- Occupations: Composer; music producer; musician
- Years active: 1965–2025
- Label: RVNG

Daniel Lentz (March 10, 1942 – July 25, 2025) was an American classical composer, musician and artist whose works focused on minimalist and electronic music.

== Life and career ==
Lentz was born in Latrobe, Pennsylvania on March 10, 1942. He achieved notability as a musician while a student at St. Vincent College and at Brandeis University, when he was awarded a fellowship in composition at Tanglewood in the summer of 1966. This was followed by a Fulbright Fellowship in Electronic Music in 1967–68, which was completed in Stockholm, Sweden. He then became a visiting lecturer at the University of California, Santa Barbara from 1968 to 1970. In 1970 he focused more on composing and performing. At this time he also formed a music ensemble, the California Time Machine, which toured North America and Europe.

In 1972, Lentz was the first American to win the Gaudeamus International Composers Award. Later, he won a number of other awards and grants. Lentz then formed and led another music ensemble, the San Andreas Fault, which made several tours of North America and Europe performing Missa Umbrarum (Mass of Shadows) (1973) amongst other works, and released several recordings in Europe. Returning to California, Lentz formed the Daniel Lentz Group in Los Angeles. This ensemble has toured much of the world and has released a number of recordings. His 1987 album The Crack in the Bell was the first contemporary classical release from Angel/EMI Records.

As an artist Lentz created acrylic sculptures notably his Illuminated Manuscript series., which are three-dimensional realisations (i.e. the score) of a recorded musical work by Lentz that accompanies each.

According to family lore, Lentz was of partial Seneca heritage through one of his great-grandmothers. His O-ke-wah (North American Eclipse), a composition for 12 voices, drum, bone rasps, and bells whose first version was written in 1974, is based on a traditional Seneca ritual dance for the dead.

Lentz had a daughter from his first marriage and lived in Southern California. He relocated to his hometown of Latrobe, Pennsylvania in 2024. Following a diagnosis of metastatic cancer, he returned to California to enter hospice care. He died of congestive heart failure on July 25, 2025 in Santa Barbara, California, at the age of 83.

== Grants, fellowships, and awards ==
- Rockefeller Foundation, Bellagio Center, Italy, Music Composition, 2012
- Opus Archives, Pacifica Institute, Music Composition, 2010
- Phoenix Arts Commission Grant, Music Composition, 2000
- 2 Arizona Commission In The Arts Grants, Music Composition, 1992, 1997
- 3 Institute For Studies In The Arts Grants, Arizona State University, Music Composition, 1993, 1995, 1996
- 5 National Endowment For The Arts Grants, Music Composition, 1973–96
- D.A.A.D Grant, Music Composition And Research, Berlin, Germany, 1979–80
- 3 Seed Fund Grants, New York, Music Composition, 1976, 1978, 1980
- California Arts Council Grant, Music Composition, 1976
- Howard Foundation Grant, Brown University, Music Composition, 1974
- First Prize, International Composers Competition, Stichting Gaudeamus, Holland, 1972
- Creative Arts Institute Award, University Of California, Berkeley, 1969
- Fulbright Fellowship, Sweden, Electronic Music And Musicology, 1967–68
- Samuel Wechsler Music Award, Brandeis University, 1967
- Tanglewood Composition Fellowship, 1966
- N.D.E.A. Fellowship-Scholarship, Brandeis University, 1965–67
- Teaching Fellowship, Ohio University, 1962–65

== Discography ==
- In a Word (with Ian William Craig) (2022, FRKWYS/RVNG International)
- Ending(s) (New World Records, 2019)
- River of 1,000 Streams (Cold Blue Music, 2017)
- In the Sea of Ionia (Cold Blue Music, 2015)
- Voices (Aoede Records)
- Wild Turkeys (Aoede Records)
- wolfMASS (Aoede Records)
- Point Conception (Cold Blue Music, LP 1984, CD 2008), (Aoede Records, 2000)
- Huit ou Neuf Pieces Dorées à Point (Aoede Records)
- Collection (Aoede Records)
- Self Portrait (Aoede Records)
- Butterfly Blood (Aoede Records)
- Missa Umbrarum (New Albion Records)
- Portraits (New Albion Records) – with John Adams, Paul Dresher, Ingram Marshall, and Stephen Scott
- Apologetica (New Albion Records)
- b.e.comings (Fontec/Rhizome Sketch Records)
- Walk into My Voice (Materiali Sonori) – with Harold Budd and Jessica Karraker
- Music for 3 Pianos (Virgin/EMI Records) – with Harold Budd and Ruben Garcia
- The Crack in the Bell (1987, Angel/EMI Records)
- On The Leopard Altar (1984; reissued 2006 by Cold Blue Music) (Icon Records)
- After Images (Cold Blue Music)
- Spell (ABC Command Records)
- Dancing on Water (Cold Blue Music) – contains Celli, with Peter Garland, Rick Cox, Jim Fox and others,
- Cold Blue anthology (Cold Blue Music) – contains You Can't See the Forest ... Music, with Ingram Marshall, Chas Smith, Harold Budd, Michael Byron, Jim Fox, and others (Cold Blue Music)
- Cold Blue Two – contains Celli, with Ingram Marshall, Chas Smith, Gavin Bryars, Jim Fox, and others (Cold Blue Music, 2012)
- Los Tigres de Marte (Cold Blue Music)
