= Zeitgeist (ensemble) =

American contemporary classical music group

Zeitgeist is an American contemporary classical music group based in Saint Paul, Minnesota. It was founded in 1977.

In 1986, the group comprised Jay Johnson and Joseph Holmquist (percussion), Robert Samarotto (clarinet and saxophone), and Gregory Theisen (piano), and played a piece they had commissioned from Frederic Rzewski two years before.

== Discography ==
- 1993 - If Tigers Were Clouds. Innova.
- 1994 - Intuitive Leaps: Zeitgeist plays Terry Riley. Sony Music Entertainment.
- 1995 - A Decade: Zeitgeist Plays Rzewski. O.O. Discs.
