= The White Arcades =

Studio album by Harold Budd
- Released: September 1988 (original); January 31, 2006 (re-release)
- Recorded: June–December, 1987
- Genre: Ambient
- Length: 40:46
- Label: Opal Records
- Producer: Brian Eno

Harold Budd chronology
Myths 3: La Nouvelle Serenite (1987)	The White Arcades (1988)	By the Dawn's Early Light (1991)

2006 re-release cover

Professional ratings
Review scores
Source	Rating
AllMusic	3/5 stars

The White Arcades (1988) is an album performed by Harold Budd. The album was recorded at various locations, including Palladium in Edinburgh, and the Cocteau Twins studio in London. Individual tracks were engineered by Robin Guthrie and Brian Eno.

Two documentaries by Ric Burns, Coney Island and The Donner Party, use the track "The White Arcades" and others from this album.

== Track listing ==
1. "The White Arcades" – 4:44
2. "Balthus Bemused by Color" – 5:16
3. "The Child with a Lion" – 6:38
4. "The Real Dream of Sails" – 6:08
5. "Algebra of Darkness" – 6:32
6. "Totems of the Red-Sleeved Warrior" – 3:23
7. "The Room" – 3:07
8. "Coyote" – 2:45
9. "The Kiss" – 3:17

== See also ==
1988 in music
