= Mysterious Skin (soundtrack) =

Mysterious Skin: Music from the Film

Soundtrack album by Robin Guthrie and Harold Budd
- Released: May 24, 2005
- Genre: Ambient
- Length: 45:01
- Label: Commotion
- Producer: Robin Guthrie, Harold Budd

Harold Budd chronology
Music for 'Fragments from the Inside' (2005)	Mysterious Skin: Music from the Film (2005)	Perhaps (2007)

Professional ratings
Review scores
Source	Rating
AllMusic	3.5/5 stars

Mysterious Skin: Music from the Film is an album of music composed and performed by Robin Guthrie and Harold Budd for the film Mysterious Skin. The music was published on a CD inside a digipak containing images from the film.

== Critical reception ==
AllMusic wrote that "the soundtrack plays as a piece, with a moody, yet darkly alluring mood prevailing throughout ... should please fans of ambient, post rock experimentation, and smart, well-executed film music." The Austin Chronicle called the music "ethereal," writing that it "subtly enriches the sense of mystery that lies at the movie's core." Vice called it "both gorgeous and sad."

Alex Ross, in The New Yorker, wrote: "Harold Budd and Robin Guthrie, in their score for the new Gregg Araki film Mysterious Skin, do something wholly unexpected: as a horrendous story of child abuse in a Kansas town unfolds, the music sways toward a state of irrational bliss, as if to numb the pain."

== Track listing ==
1. "Neil's Theme" – 2:14
2. "The Memories Returning" – 2:08
3. "Snowfall" – 6:30
4. "Neil's Farewell" – 2:31
5. "Childhood Lost" – 2:38
6. "Halloween" – 3:18
7. "A Silhouette Approaches" – 2:28
8. "Goodbye to Wendy" – 2:46
9. "Brian's Nightmare / The Unknown, Part One" – 4:04
10. "Twilight" – 3:46
11. "The Unknown, Part Two" – 2:11
12. "The Discovery" – 2:27
13. "Loitering" – 3:38
14. "The Writing on the Wall" – 1:50
15. "One True Love" – 2:32
