= Harold Budd =

American avant-garde composer and poet (1936–2020)

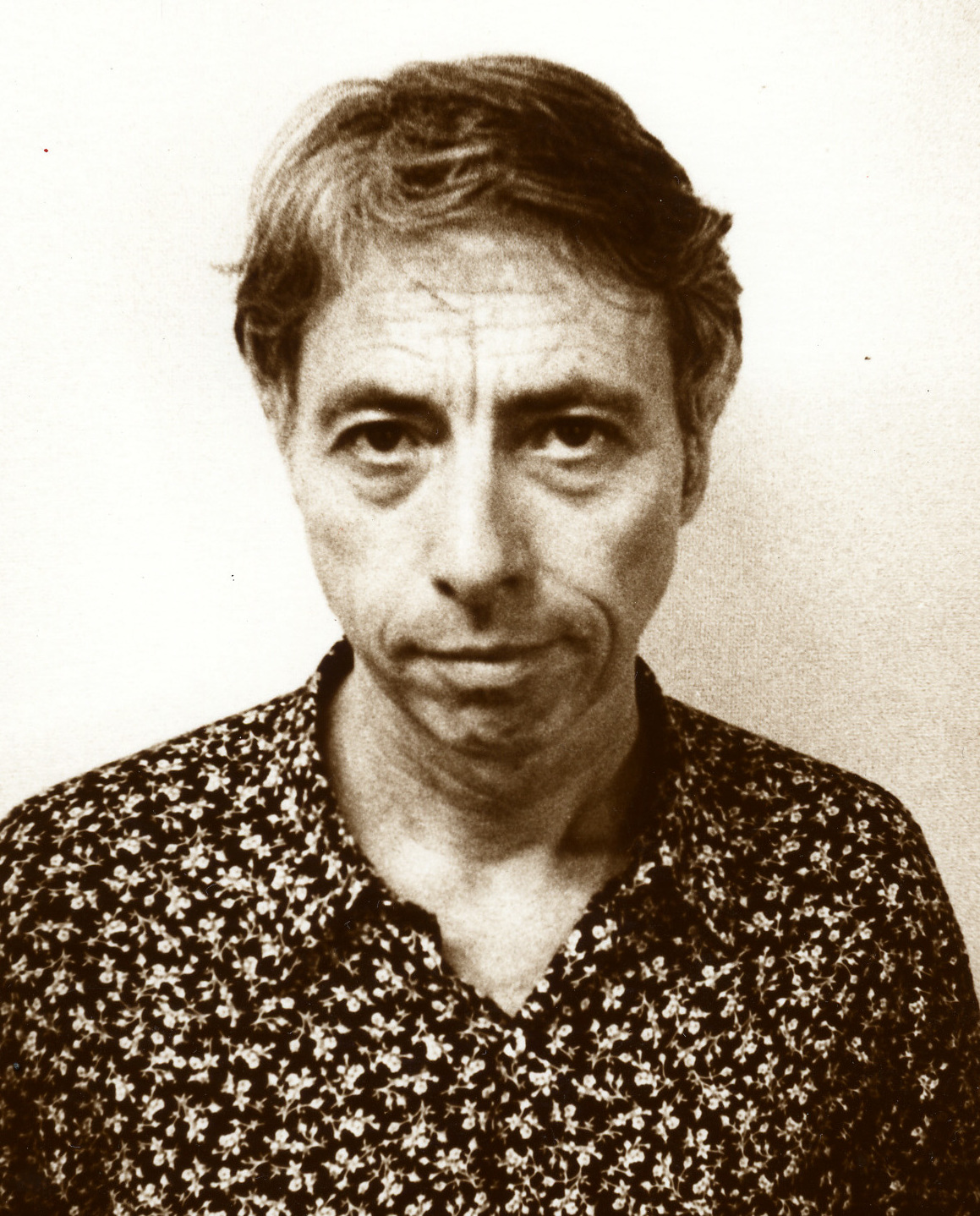

Background information
- Born: Harold Montgomory Budd; May 24, 1936; Los Angeles, California, U.S.
- Died: December 8, 2020 (aged 84) Arcadia, California, U.S.
- Genres: Minimalism; ambient; jazz; neoclassical; avant-garde
- Occupations: Musician; composer; poet; professor
- Instruments: Piano; keyboards; guitar
- Years active: 1962–2020
- Labels: Cantil; Opal; Land; Darla; Samadhi; New World; All Saints; EG; 4AD
- Website: haroldbudd.com

Harold Montgomory Budd (May 24, 1936 – December 8, 2020) was an American composer and poet. Born in Los Angeles and raised in the Mojave Desert, he became a respected composer in the minimal music and avant-garde scene of Southern California in the late 1960s, and later became better known for his work with figures such as Brian Eno and Robin Guthrie. Budd developed what he called a "soft pedal" technique for playing piano, with use of slow playing and prominent sustain.

== Early life ==
Budd was born on May 24, 1936, in Los Angeles, California, and grew up in Victorville, on the southwestern edge of the Mojave Desert.

Harold was only 13 when his father died, and soon his family fell out of their comfortable middle class existence. He was sent up to the desert to live with friends and relatives as often as possible, but the reality in Los Angeles was growing up in a tough neighborhood, and as the oldest son, being the man of the house. During this time Black culture had an enormous impact on Harold, especially jazz music and bebop, and he could be found in his teenage years playing drums in bars and jazz clubs in south-central Los Angeles.

Drafted into the United States Army, he joined the regimental band where he played drums at Presidio of Monterey (POM). Jazz saxophonist Albert Ayler was drafted at the same time and was also a member of the band. Budd joined him in gigs around the Monterey area. Budd's experience of the Army made him determined to get an education.

== Education, academic career and early works ==
Budd attended high school at Los Angeles High School, but did not graduate. He worked as "everything from cowboy to mailman," including a stint at Douglas Aircraft Company. At the age of 21, he left Douglas, and briefly moved to San Francisco. While there, he worked at Gump's. Unable to continue living in San Francisco, Budd returned to Los Angeles, and enrolled in an architecture course at Los Angeles City College. He switched to a course in harmony and renaissance counterpoint and his musical talent was spotted by a teacher who encouraged him to compose. He began to attend performances by artists like Chet Baker and Pharoah Sanders.

“From that moment on,” he recalls, “I had an insatiable appetite. Harmony, counterpoint, Renaissance music: I really heard it for the first time.”

Budd's career as a composer began in 1962. In the following years, he gained a notable reputation in the local avant-garde community. Budd studied music at California State University, Northridge, under Gerald Strang (a protégé of Arnold Schoenberg) and Aurelio de la Vega. He graduated from California State University, Northridge, and then went on full scholarship to the University of Southern California, under the tutelage of Ingolf Dahl, graduating in 1966. Budd's work of this period was primarily minimalist drone music influenced by John Cage and Morton Feldman, as well as the abstract expressionist painter Mark Rothko, with whom he corresponded.

After completing his degree in composition in 1969, Budd took up a teaching position at the California Institute of the Arts. In 1970, he released his first piece, The Oak of the Golden Dreams, which he recorded with an early model Buchla modular synthesizer at the institute.

At the encouragement of Brian Eno and Marion Brown, he left CalArts for London. Soon afterwards, Budd gave up composition, disgusted by the "academic pyrotechnics" of the avant-garde community. In London, he found his composing community of Eno, Gavin Bryars, Michael Nyman, and the members of the Cocteau Twins.

In 2004, Budd and his wife moved to Monument House in Joshua Tree, California.

== Composer and recording artist ==
The road from my first colored graph piece in 1962 to my renunciation of composing in 1970 to my resurfacing as a composer in 1972 was a process of trying out an idea and when it was obviously successful abandoning it. The early graph piece was followed by the Rothko orchestra work, the pieces for Source Magazine, the Feldman-derived chamber works, the pieces typed out or written in longhand, the out-and-out conceptual works among other things, and the model drone works (which include the sax and organ Coeur d'Orr and The Oak of the Golden Dreams, the latter based on the Balinese 'Slendro' scale which scale I used again 18 years later on 'The Real Dream of Sails').

— Harold Budd

In 1972, while still retaining his teaching career at the California Institute of the Arts, he resurfaced as a composer. Spanning from 1972 to 1975, he created four individual works under the collective title The Pavilion of Dreams. The style of these works was an unusual blend of popular jazz and the avant-garde. His 1972 work Madrigals of the Rose Angel was sent to English composer Gavin Bryars who passed it on to Brian Eno. Eno contacted Budd and brought him to London to record for his Obscure Records label.

I owe Eno everything, OK? That's the end of that... I was plucked from the tree, and suddenly I had flowered. I was just waiting. I couldn't do it on my own. I didn't know anything.

— Harold Budd

Budd resigned from the institute in 1976 and began recording his new compositions, produced by Eno. Two years later, Harold Budd's debut album, The Pavilion of Dreams (1978), was released. The first performance of the piece was at a Franciscan church in California conducted by Daniel Lentz."

The work with Eno led Budd to shift his focus to studio-led projects, characterised by use of synthesisers and electronic treatments, often collaborating with other musicians. Budd developed a style of piano playing he deemed "soft pedal," which can be described as slow and sustained. While he is often placed in the Ambient category, he emphatically declared that he was not an Ambient artist, and felt that he got "kidnapped" into the category.

His two collaborations with Eno, Ambient 2: The Plateaux of Mirror in 1980 and The Pearl in 1984, established his trademark atmospheric piano style. On Lovely Thunder, he introduced subtle electronic textures. His thematic 2000 release The Room saw a return to a more minimalist approach. In 2003, Daniel Lanois, a producer for U2 and Bob Dylan, and occasional collaborator with Brian Eno, recorded an impromptu performance of Budd playing the piano in his Los Angeles living room, unaware; it was released in 2005 as the album La Bella Vista.

He had a long-running collaboration with guitarist Robin Guthrie. They worked together initially when Budd worked with Guthrie's band Cocteau Twins on their 1985 collaboration The Moon and the Melodies. The record was released by 4AD under all the collaborator's names (rather than being a Cocteau Twins/Harold Budd record), with Budd being listed first as it was an alphabetical listing. In November 1986, the record charted on the UK Top 75 album chart, spending a week at number 46. Budd and Guthrie subsequently released several albums together, including two soundtracks to the Gregg Araki films Mysterious Skin (2004) and White Bird in a Blizzard (2014), with the last, 2020's Another Flower, recorded in 2013 but only released four days before Budd's death.

Budd also collaborated with Andy Partridge of XTC on the album Through the Hill (1994), John Foxx on the album Translucence/Drift Music (2003) and work with Jah Wobble on the Solaris concert and live album in 2002.

He composed music for the score of the 2020 miniseries I Know This Much Is True.

=== Reception ===
Brian Eno called Budd "a great abstract painter trapped in the body of a musician".

The Guardian said, "The core Budd sound of yearning piano motifs and reverberation-laden impressionism is often called minimalism, but compared with the cyclical craft of Steve Reich and early Philip Glass, his low-key, expansive forays felt deftly maximalist. This has made Budd's craft synonymous with the dreamworld. An heir to Satie and Debussy, his music was treated and poetic, never kneejerk nor incautious."

== Death ==
Budd was undergoing therapy at a short-term rehabilitation facility after suffering a stroke on November 11, 2020. It was there he contracted COVID-19 amidst the COVID-19 pandemic in California. He died from complications of the virus at a hospital in Arcadia on December 8, 2020. He was 84.

== Selected discography ==
Albums

- The Pavilion of Dreams (1978)
- The Serpent (In Quicksilver) (1981)
- Abandoned Cities (1984)
- Lovely Thunder (1986)
- The White Arcades (1988)
- Agua (1995) (Live)
- Luxa (1996)
- The Room (2000)
- La Bella Vista (2003)
- Avalon Sutra / As Long as I Can Hold My Breath (2004)
- Perhaps (2007) (Live)
- In The Mist (2011)
- Bandits of Stature (2012)
- Jane 1-11 (2013)
- Jane 12-21 (2014)
- I Know This Much Is True (2020) (Film score)

Collaborations

- Ambient 2: The Plateaux of Mirror (1980) (with Brian Eno)
- The Pearl (1984) (with Brian Eno)
- The Moon and the Melodies (1986) (with Cocteau Twins)
- By the Dawn's Early Light (1991) (with Bill Nelson, B. J. Cole, Susan Allen)
- Music for 3 Pianos (1992) (with Ruben Garcia and Daniel Lentz.)
- Through the Hill (1994) (with Andy Partridge)
- She is a Phantom (1994) (with Zeitgeist) (Live)
- Translucence/Drift Music (2003) (with John Foxx)
- Mysterious Skin – Music from the Film (2005) (with Robin Guthrie)
- White Bird in a Blizzard (2014) (with Robin Guthrie)
- Another Flower (2020) (with Robin Guthrie)

== See also ==
- Experimental music
- List of ambient music artists
