= Black Spring (EP) =

EP by Lush
- Released: 7 October 1991
- Recorded: September 1991
- Studios: September Sound in London, England
- Genres: Dream pop; shoegaze; alternative rock
- Length: 17:55
- Label: 4AD
- Producer: Robin Guthrie

Lush chronology
Gala (1990)	Black Spring (1991)	Spooky (1992)

Singles from Black Spring
- 1. "Nothing Natural" Released: 7 October 1991

Black Spring is the third extended play by the English alternative rock band Lush. It was released on 7 October 1991 on 4AD. The opening track, "Nothing Natural", was released as a single with the B-side "God's Gift". Several other songs were included on the EP, including a cover version of "Lady" by Dennis Wilson.

Produced by Cocteau Twins guitarist Robin Guthrie, Black Spring was the result of several months of writing by Lush. The band originally intended to release a full-length studio album in spring 1991, but found themselves with little material after the release of their 1990 EPs. Lush recorded Black Spring at September Sound in London in September 1991, experimenting with their guitar and drum sound using sequencers and MIDI.

Upon its release, Black Spring reached No. 2 in the UK Independent Singles Chart, and "Nothing Natural" peaked at No. 43 on the UK Singles Chart. The EP was followed by a national British tour, during which bassist Steve Rippon left the band and was replaced by Phil King.

== Background and recording ==
Between 1989 and 1990, Lush released the mini album Scar, as well as two EPs—Mad Love and Sweetness and Light—that were compiled and released on the compilation album Gala in November 1990. Receiving unanimous acclaim, Gala was due to be succeeded by a full-length debut album in spring 1991. However, Lush found themselves in a situation where they only "[had] about two and a half songs". Vocalist-guitarist Miki Berenyi attributed the lack of output to the sheer amount of material released between 1989 and 1990, explaining in Sounds in January 1991: "Having released Sweetness and Light with two extra songs on it, we're again left in a position where we haven't got any songs." She further said that "most bands have been going a fair amount of time and've built up a set", whereas Lush had not and didn't feel like writing an album's worth of new material unless it was "a more coherent body of work".

By summer 1991, Lush had composed up to 21 new songs, and hinted at new material, expressing an interest in experimenting with drum machines, sequencers and MIDI equipment. Guitarist Emma Anderson said the band were attempting to become more "technically minded" and create "some more interesting sounds" without sounding overproduced. Lush began recording Black Spring in September, choosing Guthrie as a producer; he had produced Mad Love for the band in 1990. The recording sessions were held at September Sound, Guthrie's own recording studio in southwest London, with Guthrie and assistant engineer Mitsuo Tate.

Guthrie's contributions to Black Spring included extensive use of compressors and gates, and recording the majority of Anderson and Berenyi's guitar tracks via DI units instead of using the traditional method of using microphones to record the guitar amplifiers. Occasional microphone-recorded guitar tracks were used during the sessions; Berenyi's Mesa Boogie Mark IV combo amplifier was recorded in mono and Anderson's was recorded in stereo. The band chose not to record both guitarists' tracks in stereo as "it would be too much" considering the amount of delay used.

== Lyrics and music ==
Black Spring features four songs: "Nothing Natural", a cover of Dennis Wilson's "Lady" (retitled "Fallin' in Love"), "God's Gift" and "Monochrome". Anderson was the primary songwriter of Black Spring's material; Anderson solely wrote and composed "Nothing Natural" and "Monochrome", and co-wrote "God's Gift" with Berenyi. As a result of Anderson's increased role in Lush's songwriting, Black Spring's songs were "lighter and less punky" than the band's previous releases, but the songs—particularly the lyrics—still maintained the band's "moody dreampop" trademarks.

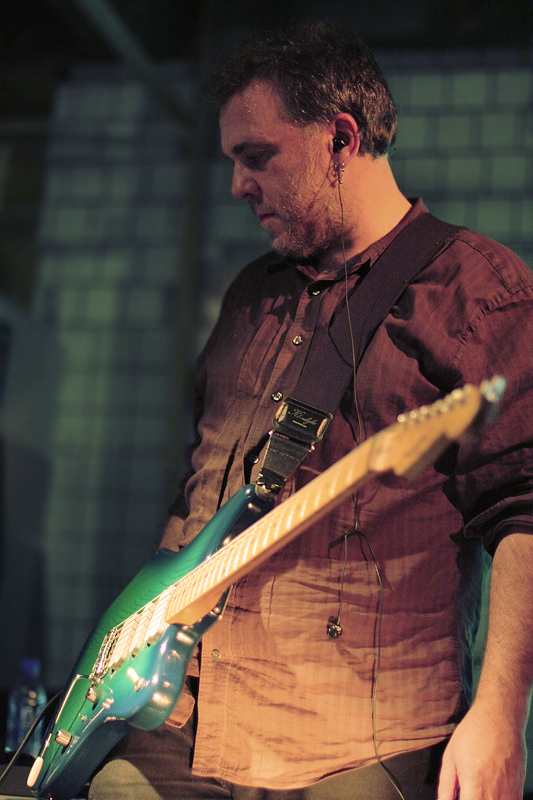
Producer Robin Guthrie (pictured in 2008) experimented with sequencing and sampling drummer Chris Acland's drum sound.

Described as "space-age guitar pop" featuring Anderson and Berenyi's "wistful, hippy harmonies", the songs on Black Spring are marked by unconventional and constantly changing time signatures developed by Anderson and drummer Chris Acland. Acland's drum sound on Black Spring changed significantly as a result of in-studio experimentation. Berenyi had originally experimented writing drum loops on a Roland R-5, but Acland instead worked with producer Robin Guthrie on writing and recording his drum parts. Guthrie suggested a technique in which Acland's tracks were played into a sequencer from Simmons pads, which then triggered sampled drum sounds. The technique was used on all of Acland's drum tracks—except for the cymbals—and he was initially critical of the process, stating "it doesn't seem that natural", but said the process was "quicker" and "the end result sounds like a really good drum kit".

Black Spring features a celeste sample and Roland drum machine on "Fallin' in Love", as well as Lush's effects-laden guitar sound throughout. Anderson and Berenyi both used a vast amount of chorus effect on their guitars; Berenyi's chorus sound was from a Boss CE-2 pedal and Anderson's from a Roland GP-16 multieffects unit. Berenyi used several other Boss effects on Black Spring, including distortion (DS-1), overdrive (SD-1) and delay (DD-3).

== Packaging and music video ==
Black Spring's packaging and artwork was designed by Vaughan Oliver, who had designed artwork for all of Lush's previous releases. Oliver's designs featured photography by Jim Friedman. As with their previous releases, Lush included two obscure messages on the run-out matrix codes on the groove of the 12-inch record pressing of Black Spring. The messages read "Lush and Ride at the Enormodrome" on side 1 and "they've got this much talent" on side 2.

A promotional music video was released for "Nothing Natural" in 1991. Reflecting on the music video, Berenyi said it was "an effing nightmare" and that the video's director had "some ludicrous idea of what he wanted [Lush] to look/act like in the video and it was nothing to do with how [the band was]". Berenyi further explained that the band went along with the director's suggestion as Lush "had no ideas of [their] own at all, and back in the 90s the solution was to offer directors a shitload of money to come up with something fabulous that MTV would play". According to Berenyi, Nirvana vocalist and guitarist Kurt Cobain became a Lush fan after seeing the music video.

== Release and reception ==
"Nothing Natural"

Single by Lush

from the album Black Spring
- B-side: "God's Gift"/"Monochrome"/"Nothing Natural" (version)
- Released: 7 October 1991
- Recorded: September 1991
- Genre: Dream pop; shoegaze
- Length: 4:02 (single edit); 5:54 (album version)
- Label: 4AD; Reprise
- Songwriter: Emma Anderson
- Producer: Robin Guthrie

Lush singles chronology
"Sweetness and Light" (1990)	"Nothing Natural" (1991)	"For Love" (1991)

Black Spring was released on 7 October 1991 on 4AD. It was issued as a 12-inch and CD, and was later made available as a digital download.

Black Spring's opening track, "Nothing Natural", was issued as the EP's lead single on the same day. Featuring a shortened edit of the title track, it was released as a 7" and cassette single, with "God's Gift" as the B-side. A maxi CD single was released in the United States, with "God's Gift", "Monochrome" and the full-length EP version of "Nothing Natural" as B-sides. "Monochrome" was originally intended as Black Spring's main A-side and single—as suggested by producer Robin Guthrie—but 4AD instead chose "Nothing Natural", believing it to be a superior track.

"Nothing Natural" entered the UK Singles Chart in its first week of release, peaking at No. 43, and Black Spring reached No. 2 on the UK Independent Singles Chart. "Nothing Natural" also charted in the US, peaking at No. 22 on Billboard's Modern Rock Tracks chart.

In support of both Black Spring and the "Nothing Natural" single, Lush began a two-leg national tour, during which the band exclusively debuted the songs from the EP. The tour began with two "warm-up" shows at Colne Municipal Hall in Colne on 7 October 1991 and Northampton Irish Centre on 8 October, before three main shows at various London venues from 9 to 12 October. The second leg, featuring support from Gallon Drunk, included eight further dates, starting at the University of Bradford on 21 October and concluding at Fox's in Wolverhampton on 28 October.

Just before the second leg of the Black Spring tour, bassist Rippon decided to leave Lush. It was reported that he left due to "personal reasons", but that his relationship with the rest of the band was "perfectly amicable". Rippon confirmed later that the band's "strenuous schedule" for 1992, including planned tours of Australia, Japan and the US, contributed to his decision. He continued until the end of the tour, after which he was replaced by King in December 1991.

"Nothing Natural" and "Monochrome" were featured on Lush's debut full-length studio album, Spooky (1992), and remastered versions of both songs were included on Ciao! Best of Lush, a compilation album released in 2001.

== Track listings ==
=== Black Spring EP ===
- UK 12-inch EP (4AD, BAD 1016)

Side 1

1. "Nothing Natural" (Emma Anderson) – 5:54
2. "Fallin' in Love" (Dennis Wilson) – 2:43

Side 2

3. "God's Gift"
4. (Anderson, Miki Berenyi)
5. "Monochrome" (Anderson) – 5:06
- UK CD EP (4AD, BAD 1016 CD)
1. "Nothing Natural" (Anderson) – 5:54
2. "Fallin' in Love" (Wilson) – 2:43
3. "God's Gift" (Anderson, Berenyi) – 4:12
4. "Monochrome" (Anderson) – 5:06

=== "Nothing Natural" single ===
- UK 7-inch single (4AD, AD 1016)

Side 1

1. "Nothing Natural" (Anderson) – 4:02

Side 2

2. "God's Gift"
3. (Anderson, Berenyi)
- UK cassette single (4AD, AD C 1016

Side 1

1. "Nothing Natural" (Anderson) – 4:02

Side 2

2. "God's Gift"
3. (Anderson, Berenyi)
- US maxi CD single (4AD/Reprise Records, 9 40231-2)
1. "Nothing Natural" (Anderson) – 5:54
2. "God's Gift" (Anderson, Berenyi) – 4:12
3. "Monochrome" (Anderson) – 5:06
4. "Nothing Natural" (Version) (Anderson) – 4:02
- UK promotional CD single (4AD, LUSH 1 CD)
1. "Nothing Natural" (Anderson) – 4:02
2. "Monochrome" (Anderson) – 5:06
3. "Nothing Natural" (12" Version) (Anderson) – 5:54

== Personnel ==
All personnel credits adapted from Black Spring's notes.

Lush

- Chris Acland – drums
- Emma Anderson – guitars, vocals
- Miki Berenyi – vocals, guitars
- Steve Rippon – bass

Technical personnel

- Robin Guthrie – production, engineering
- Mitsuo Tate – assistant engineering

Design personnel

- Vaughan Oliver – design
- Jim Friedman – photography

== Charts ==
Chart (1991)	Peak position
UK Singles Chart	43
UK Independent Singles Chart	2
US Alternative Airplay (Billboard)	22
