= Sweetness and Light (EP) =

EP by Lush
- Released: 15 October 1990
- Recorded: August 1990
- Studios: Recorded at The Greenhouse, mixed at Wessex Sound Studios in London, England
- Genres: Dream pop; shoegaze
- Length: 11:13
- Label: 4AD
- Producer: Tim Friese-Greene

Lush chronology
Mad Love (1990)	Sweetness and Light (1990)	Gala (1990)

Singles from Sweetness and Light
- 1. "Sweetness and Light" Released: 15 October 1990

Sweetness and Light is the second extended play by the English alternative rock band Lush. It was released on 15 October 1990 on 4AD. Featuring a less abrasive sound than the band's earlier releases, the title track was also released as Lush's first single and included the B-side "Breeze".

Tim Friese-Greene produced Sweetness and Light over a six-week period at the Greenhouse and Wessex Sound Studios in London. The recording sessions took considerably longer than Lush's previous sessions with Robin Guthrie and John Fryer, but resulted in a more atmospheric dream pop sound.

Sweetness and Light received mixed reviews upon release, but led to Lush's first major headlining national tour and placed in the national charts. The single was particularly successful in the United States, where it placed at No. 4 on the Billboard Modern Rock Tracks chart and received heavy rotation on radio.

== Background and recording ==
In 1989, Lush released their debut mini album Scar to warm reviews, and followed up the album with the Mad Love EP in February 1990. Mad Love brought a large amount of attention to the band from both the alternative and mainstream British press, with vocalist-guitarist Miki Berenyi and guitarist Emma Anderson becoming the subject of several gossip columns in national weeklies. Lush also began performing to larger audiences, performing at the Glastonbury Festival of Contemporary Performing Arts and opening as support for the Cure at the Crystal Palace Bowl in London, England in summer 1990.

Lush began searching for a producer for their next set of material, and Talk Talk producer Friese-Greene was recommended. The band were unfamiliar with his work—though Anderson and Berenyi purchased copies of Talk Talk albums just prior to the initial recording sessions—while Friese-Greene was already a fan of Lush. Sweetness and Light was recorded at the Greenhouse, a mid-range studio in London, in August 1990 with Friese-Greene and engineer Ed Buller. The sessions were unusually long for Lush; overall production was done over a six-week period, with mixing completed at Wessex Sound Studios.

Friese-Greene's approach was considered as "enthusiastic" by Berenyi, and Anderson regarded his techniques as significantly different than Mad Love producer Guthrie and Scar producer Fryer. According to Anderson, Friese-Greene changed the original drum tracks to "Sweetness and Light", as well making several edits to the song's overall structure.

== Lyrics and music ==
"Sweetness and Light" is regarded as one of Lush's signature songs. It is less "heavy" than the band's earlier post-punk-oriented material and has a "looser, lighter air" in its composition and production.

Stylistically, "Sweetness and Light" is a dream pop song featuring elements of shoegaze music. Described as a "pure pop song", it uses feedback and several effects units on Anderson and Berenyi's guitar tracks. Both Berenyi's lead vocal and Anderson's backing vocal (which drew comparisons to Bilinda Butcher of My Bloody Valentine) are mixed low and obscured. According to NME writer Steve Lamacq, the vocals were "half-hidden" as they were symbolic of the band's "withdrawn" approach towards pop music and their "reluctance to become a "blatant" part of the current 'indie' rush to the charts."

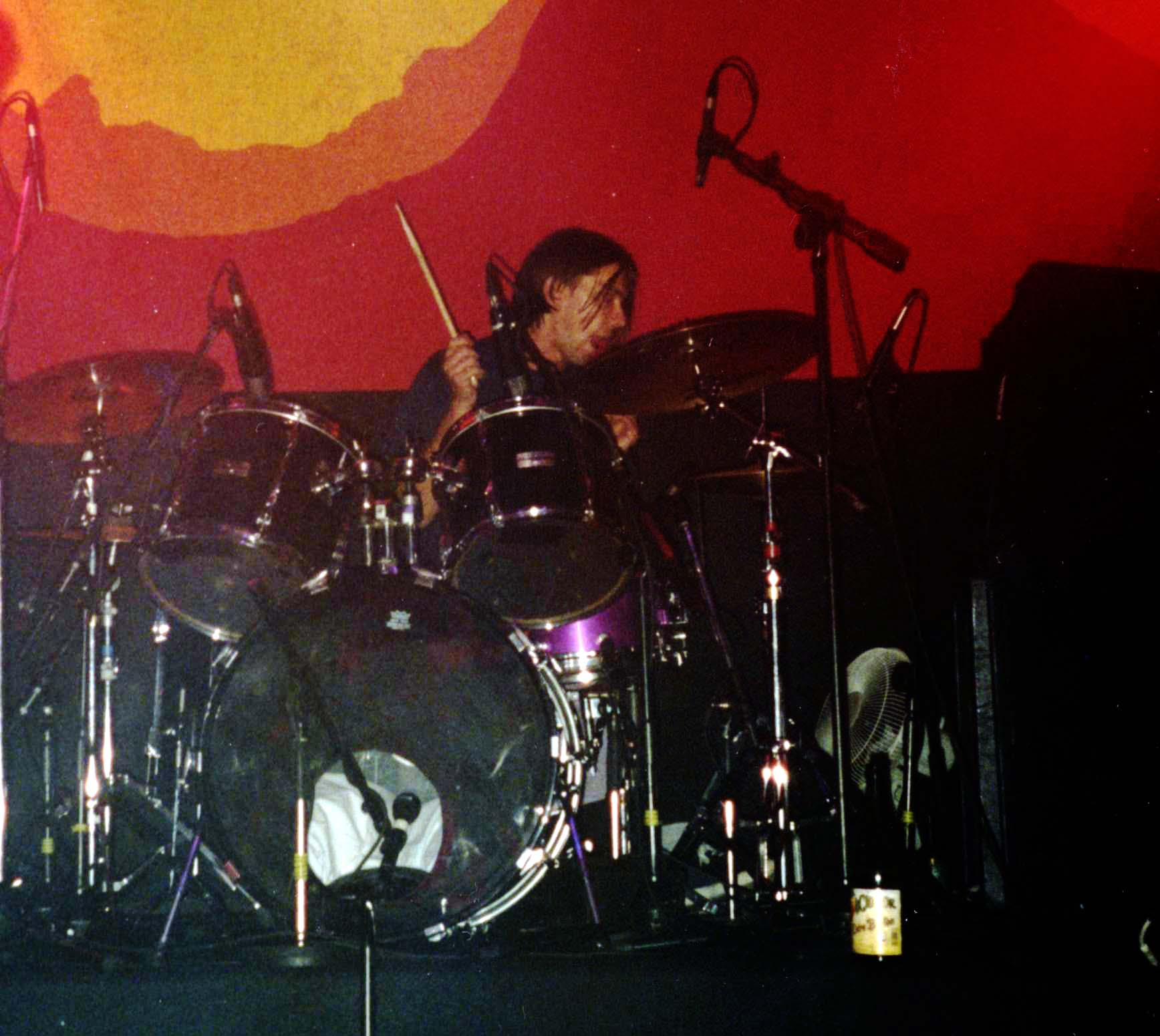
Drummer Chris Acland (pictured in 1994) performed "Sweetness and Light" in a style reminiscent of Madchester music.

"Sweetness and Light"'s drum and bass instrumentation — performed by Chris Acland and Steve Rippon respectively — are arranged in a Madchester style and drew comparison to the Stone Roses. Additional percussion on the track was performed by Phil Overhead. Acland and Rippon's rhythm section was made more prominent and "dancefloor-worthy" in Kevin Shields' "Orange Squash" remix, included on the soundtrack to the 1999 film Splendor.

== Packaging and music video ==
Sweetness and Light's packaging was commissioned by 4AD. Vaughan Oliver, who had designed the album sleeves for Scar and Mad Love, was head of direction and designed Sweetness and Light's artwork. The artwork features photography by Jim Friedman.

The run-out matrix codes on the groove of the 12-inch record pressing of Sweetness and Light included two obscure messages: "Cool, fresh, milk float" on side 1 and "What's hiding under the sheets?" on side 2. Similar messages were hidden on the vinyl pressings of Scar and Mad Love.

A promotional music video for "Sweetness and Light" was released in 1990. The video was directed by Peter Scammell. At the time of its release, the video received acclaim.

== Release and reception ==
"Sweetness and Light"

Single by Lush
- B-side: "Breeze"
- Released: 15 October 1990
- Recorded: August 1990 at the Greenhouse in London, England
- Genre: Madchester; dream pop
- Length: 4:12 (Single edit); 5:16 (Album version)
- Label: 4AD
- Songwriter: Emma Anderson
- Producer: Tim Friese-Greene

Lush singles chronology
"Sweetness and Light" (1990)	"Nothing Natural" (1991)

Sweetness and Light was released on 15 October 1990 on 4AD in the United Kingdom. Featuring "Sweetness and Light", "Sunbathing" and "Breeze", it was issued as a 12-inch and CD and was later made available as a digital download.

The EP's title track was also released as Lush's first single, pressed as both a 7-inch and cassette single. For the single release, "Sunbathing" was omitted from the track listing and a shortened version of "Sweetness and Light" was used for the 7-inch's A-side. A promotional single, featuring both edits of the song, was released to radio in the United States to support the release of the compilation album Gala in December.

Upon its release, Sweetness and Light entered in the UK Singles Chart, peaking at No. 47 in its first week of release. The title song was a considerable independent success in the US, receiving heavy radio airplay and peaking at No. 4 on the Billboard Modern Rock Tracks chart as a result.

Critical reception to Sweetness and Light was mixed. Melody Maker considered the single "sorely over-produced", while NME's Terry Staunton considered the EP "glorious" and "pure Lush". A 13-date headlining British tour was announced in support of Sweetness and Light, featuring support from Faith over Reason. The tour began on 21 October 1990 at Zap Club in Brighton and concluded on 5 November at the Town & Country Club in London. On the tour, "Sweetness and Light" became a fan favourite and a staple of Lush's setlists for the subsequent 1990 tours in both the US and Japan.

Lush were signed to Reprise Records on a licensing and distribution deal in the US a week after the release of Sweetness and Light, and the EP was reissued as part of Gala in November 1990. A remastered version of the title track was included on Ciao! Best of Lush, a compilation album released in March 2001, and the song was made available as downloadable content for the Rock Band video game series in July 2009.

== Track listings ==
All songs written and composed by Emma Anderson unless otherwise noted.

=== EP track listings ===
- UK 12-inch EP (4AD, BAD 0013)

Side one

1. "Sweetness and Light" – 5:16

Side two

2. "Sunbathing" – 3:09
3. "Breeze" (Anderson, Miki Berenyi) – 2:48
- UK CD EP (4AD, BAD 0013 CD)
1. "Sweetness and Light" – 5:16
2. "Sunbathing" – 3:09
3. "Breeze" (Anderson, Berenyi) – 2:48

=== Single track listings ===
- UK 7-inch single (4AD, AD 0013)

Side one

1. "Sweetness and Light" – 4:12

Side two

2. "Breeze" (Anderson, Berenyi) – 2:48
- UK cassette single (4AD, AD C 0013)
1. "Sweetness and Light" – 5:16
2. "Breeze" (Anderson, Berenyi) – 2:48
- US promotional CD single (4AD/Reprise, PRO-CD-4568)
1. "Sweetness and Light" (Single Edit) – 4:12
2. "Sweetness and Light" (Album Version) – 5:16

== Personnel ==
All personnel credits adapted from Sweetness and Light's notes.

Lush

- Chris Acland – drums
- Emma Anderson – guitar, backing vocals
- Miki Berenyi – vocals, guitar
- Steve Rippon – bass

Additional musicians

- Phil Overhead – percussion

Technical personnel

- Tim Friese-Greene – production
- Ed Buller – engineering

Design personnel

- Vaughan Oliver – art direction, design
- Jim Friedman – photography

== Charts ==
Chart (1990)	Peak position
UK Singles Chart	47
US Alternative Airplay (Billboard)	4
