= Ciao! Best of Lush =

Greatest hits album by Lush
- Released: 19 March 2001
- Recorded: July 1989 – August 1996
- Genres: Shoegaze, dream pop, Britpop
- Length: 72:48
- Label: 4AD
- Producers: Lush, John Fryer, Tim Friese-Greene, Robin Guthrie, Mike Hedges, Pete Bartlett

Lush chronology
| Lovelife (1996) | Ciao! Best of Lush (2001) | Blind Spot EP (2016) |

Professional ratings
Review scores
| Source | Rating |
|---|---|
| AllMusic | 4.5/5 stars |
| Pitchfork | (8.1/10) |

Ciao! Best of Lush is a compilation album by the band Lush, released in March 2001 by 4AD. The essay in the booklet was written by Dominic Wills and included quotes from members Miki Berenyi and Emma Anderson. The best-of CD appeared almost five years after the band's dissolution and drummer Chris Acland's suicide; the compilation was dedicated to his memory.

== Track listing ==
| No. | Title | Writer(s) | Length |
|---|---|---|---|
| 1. | "Ladykillers" | Miki Berenyi | 3:13 |
| 2. | "Single Girl" | Emma Anderson | 2:35 |
| 3. | "Ciao!" (featuring Jarvis Cocker) | Berenyi | 3:31 |
| 4. | "500 (Shake Baby Shake)" (Single Remix) | Anderson | 3:21 |
| 5. | "Light from a Dead Star" | Berenyi | 3:17 |
| 6. | "Love at First Sight" | Stuart Moxham | 5:12 |
| 7. | "Hypocrite" | Berenyi | 2:53 |
| 8. | "Desire Lines" | Anderson | 7:39 |
| 9. | "Lovelife" | Anderson | 3:56 |
| 10. | "When I Die" | Anderson | 4:19 |
| 11. | "Nothing Natural" | Anderson | 5:54 |
| 12. | "Untogether" | Berenyi | 3:34 |
| 13. | "For Love" | Berenyi | 3:30 |
| 14. | "Monochrome" | Anderson | 5:06 |
| 15. | "De-Luxe" | Anderson | 3:28 |
| 16. | "Sweetness and Light" | Anderson | 5:17 |
| 17. | "Thoughtforms" | Anderson | 2:44 |
| 18. | "Etheriel" | Anderson, Berenyi | 3:24 |

== Release history ==
| Country | Date | Label | Format | Catalogue # |
|---|---|---|---|---|
| United Kingdom | 19 March 2001 | 4AD | CD | GAD 2K22 CD |
| United States | 5 June 2001 | 4AD | CD | GAD 2K22 CD |
| Worldwide | 27 November 2015 | 4AD | 2LP red vinyl | GAD 2K22 |

== Credits ==
- Tracks 1, 2, 3 and 4 taken from Lovelife, March 1996
  - Produced by Pete Bartlett and Lush
- Tracks 5, 7, 8, 9 and 10 taken from Split, June 1994
  - Produced by Mike Hedges and Lush
- Track 6 taken from the single "Hypocrite", May 1994
  - Produced by Mike Hedges and Lush
- Tracks 11, 12, 13 and 14 taken from Spooky, January 1992
  - Produced by Robin Guthrie
- Track 15 taken from the EP Mad Love, February 1990
  - Produced by Robin Guthrie
- Track 16 taken from the single "Sweetness and Light", October 1990
  - Produced by Tim Friese-Greene
- Tracks 17 and 18 taken from the mini-album Scar, October 1989
  - Produced by John Fryer and Lush

=== Ciao! credits ===
- Remastered by John Dent at Loud Mastering.
- Art direction by Vaughan Oliver at v23.
- Design by Chris Bigg at v23.
- Photography by Dominic Davies, from single artwork designed by v23.
- Original photographs by Jim Friedman, Richard Caldicott and Ichiro Kono.
- Portraits by Mike Diver (page 3), Michael Lavine (page 6), Suzie Gibbons (page 12) and Sheila Rock (pages 9–19).
