= The Lillies =

Pop music group

The Lillies were an indie rock band formed as a collaboration between members of the bands Cocteau Twins (Simon Raymonde), Lush (Miki Berenyi, Chris Acland) and Moose (Kevin McKillop, Russell Yates).

They released only one song titled "And David Seaman Will Be Very Disappointed About That...", inspired by the words spoken by BBC commentator Barry Davies after Gary Lineker scored past David Seaman at the 1990–91 FA Cup semi-final. The song appeared on a flexi-disc that came with the Tottenham Hotspur football fanzine The Spur (Issue 24, September 1991). The band members were all Tottenham fans, and recorded the track at the suggestion of Stuart Mutler, editor of The Spur.

The song commemorates the 3–1 victory over Arsenal FC in the FA Cup semi-final in May 1991. After rejecting suggestions that they should record a cover version of an old football song, such as "Nice One Cyril", they decided to come up with an original song. The only discernible vocals on the track are Miki Berenyi chanting "Three-one". Yates said of the track: "...we've all been Spurs fans for years, and for myself making this flexi has probably made me more proud than making any Moose record".
