= Spooky (album) =

Studio album by Lush
- Released: 27 January 1992
- Recorded: July – October 1991
- Studios: September Sound, London
- Genres: Shoegaze; dream pop
- Length: 48:21
- Label: 4AD
- Producer: Robin Guthrie

Lush chronology
Black Spring (1991)	Spooky (1992)	Split (1994)

Singles from Spooky
- 1. "Nothing Natural" Released: 7 October 1991; 2. "For Love" Released: 30 December 1991; 3. "Superblast!" Released: February 1992

Spooky is the debut studio album by English rock band Lush. It was released on 27 January 1992 by 4AD. The album, produced by Robin Guthrie of Cocteau Twins, followed the band's mini album, Scar (1989), several extended play releases, and the compilation album Gala (1990). Spooky reached the UK Top 10 and topped the national indie charts. The album produced three singles: "Nothing Natural", "For Love" and "Superblast!".

== Reception ==
Professional ratings
Review scores
Source	Rating
AllMusic	3.5/5 stars
Entertainment Weekly	A−
NME	7/10
Pitchfork	8.6/10
Rolling Stone	3/5 stars
Select	4/5

In 2016, Pitchfork ranked Spooky at number 27 on its list of "The 50 Best Shoegaze Albums of All Time". In the album's entry, Paula Mejia said:

Shortly after the release of their debut album, Spooky, Lush were invited to play Lollapalooza's mainstage by Perry Farrell himself. It helped the London quartet break through stateside, but was still a less-than-likely festival booking—because, unlike other rock records of the early 1990s, Spooky doesn't rely on blistering noise to make its points. Its brilliant intricacies remain best appreciated alone, through headphones, and preferably in a room where long shadows creep onto the walls. Each element in the mix—from the caffeinated basslines in "For Love" to the reverbed guitars in "Fantasy"—is layered on thickly yet proportionately. Its lyrical themes, which range from hazy dreams to long-lost friends, are helmed adroitly by co-vocalists and guitarists Emma Anderson and Miki Berenyi—together, they set a template for the kind of wistful musings that shoegaze became known for. Their incantations are only frightening in how wonderful they are.

== Track listing ==
No.	Title	Writer(s)	Length
1.	"Stray"	Miki Berenyi	2:07
2.	"Nothing Natural"	Emma Anderson	5:54
3.	"Tiny Smiles"	Anderson; Berenyi	4:26
4.	"Covert"	Berenyi	3:34
5.	"Ocean"	Berenyi	4:49
6.	"For Love"	Berenyi	3:29
7.	"Superblast!"	Anderson	4:07
8.	"Untogether"	Berenyi	3:33
9.	"Fantasy"	Anderson	4:27
10.	"Take"	Berenyi	3:28
11.	"Laura"	Anderson	3:22
12.	"Monochrome"	Anderson	5:05

== Release history ==
Country	Date	Label	Format	Catalogue #
United Kingdom	27 January 1992	4AD	CD	CAD 2002 CD
United Kingdom	27 January 1992	4AD	Limited CD in digipak sleeve	CAD D 2002 CD
United Kingdom	27 January 1992	4AD	Double 10" vinyl	CAD D 2002
United States	4 February 1992	4AD/Reprise	CD	9 26798-2
Japan		Nippon Columbia	CD (two bonus tracks)	COCY-80092

== Singles ==
- "Black Spring EP" (29 October 1991)
  - CD BAD 1016 (US only, Reprise Records 9 40231-2)
    1. "Nothing Natural" – 5:56
    2. "God's Gift" – 4:10
    3. "Monochrome" – 5:07
    4. "Nothing Natural (Version)" – 3:59
- "For Love" (30 December 1991)
  - CD (BAD 2001 CD); 10" vinyl (BAD D 2001); 12" vinyl (BAD 2001)
    1. "For Love" – 3:32
    2. "Starlust" – 4:21
    3. "Outdoor Miner" – 2:46 (Wire cover)
    4. "Astronaut" – 2:37
- "Superblast!" (Promo-only, January 1992)
  - Radio promo CD (PRO-CD-5471)
    1. "Superblast! (Gil Norton Remix)" – 4:04
    2. "Starlust" – 4:21
    3. "Fallin' in Love" – 2:38 (Dennis Wilson cover)
    4. "Superblast! (Album Version)" – 4:08

== Personnel ==
Lush

- Miki Berenyi – vocals, guitar
- Emma Anderson – guitar, vocals
- Steve Rippon – bass
- Chris Acland – drums

== Charts ==
Chart (1992)	Peak position
Dutch Albums (Album Top 100)	68
UK Albums (Official Charts)	7
US Heatseekers Albums (Billboard)	20
