= Martin Masai Andersen =

Danish photographer, art director, designer and educator, based in London

Martin Masai Andersen (born 1972) is a Danish photographer, art director and designer, based in South London. He also lectures at a number of universities. Andersen has made long-term documentary photography projects on football fans and dog shows, and made music videos for The Breeders, Lush and Iceage. His animation work has won a Clio Award and been shown in group exhibitions at Manchester Art Gallery and at SeaCity Museum in Southampton.

== Life and work ==
Andersen grew up in Denmark and moved to London in 1993. He earned a BA in visual communication design from Ravensbourne University London (1993–1996) and a MA in graphic design from the Royal College of Art in London (1996–1998).

Since 2000, in partnership with his sister Line Andersen, he has been creative director at Andersen M Studio in London working in art direction, graphic design, photography, animation, film and music. His work there includes making the music videos for "Against the Moon" by Iceage, "Blind Spot" by Lush, "Wait in the Car" by The Breeders, and "12:36" by Lowly.

His documentary photography series and book, Can't Smile Without You, is about fans of Tottenham Hotspur Football Club. It was made between 2013 and 2017 "on the streets and in the pubs before and after" the team's football matches. The title refers to the song "Can't Smile Without You", popularised by Barry Manilow in 1978, "which fans adopted as the club's anthem." His documentary photography series Dog Shows, made between 2004 and 2019, is about international dog shows in North America and Europe.

Andersen is an associate lecturer on "art direction and graphic design concepts" on the BA Fashion Communication course at Central Saint Martins, School of Fashion, London (2000–); senior lecturer at the University of Brighton School of Art; and module leader at Cambridge School of Visual & Performing Arts (2017–).

== Publications ==
=== Publications by Andersen ===
- Can't Smile Without You. London: Andersen M Studio, 2019. ISBN 978-1-5272-4955-4. With a foreword by Joe Kerr and an interview with Andersen by Felix Petty.

=== Publications with contributions by Andersen ===
- Visceral Pleasures. UK: Booth-Clibborn, 2000. Rick Poynor, Vaughan Oliver. ISBN 1861540728.
- Intro, Sampler2: Art, Pop & Contemporary Music Graphics. UK: Laurence King, 2000. ISBN 1856692248.
- The New Handmade Graphics: Beyond Digital Design. UK: Rotovision, 2003. Hannah Ford, Anne Odling-Smee. ISBN 2880467039.
- All Messed Up. UK: Laurence King, 2003. Anna Gerber. ISBN 1856693902.
- Swinging London – Graphisme & Music Aujourd'hui. France: Centre Du Graphisme, 2004. Michel Bouvet. ISBN 2951917163.
- 1000 Supreme CD Designs. Spain: Maomao, 2008. Estel Vilaseca. ISBN 9789812456588.
- 1000 Music Graphics. USA: Rockport, 2008. Clif Stoltze. ISBN 9781592534043.
- Small Studios. Berlin: Hesign, 2009. Jianping He. ISBN 9783981054415.
- Bookworm. Berlin: Hesign, 2010. Jianping He. ISBN 978-3-9810544-9-1.
- Papercraft 2: Design and Art with Paper. Germany: Gestalten, 2011. R. Klanten, B. Meyer. ISBN 978-3899553338.
- Book Art:Iconic Sculptures and Installations Made From Books. Germany: Gestalten, 2011. ISBN 978-3899553666.
- Pictographic Index 2. Holland: Pepin, 2011. Hans Lijklema.
- Unlimited, The Best Small Design Studios of the World. China: Sendpoints, 2011. Jimmy Chai.
- One by One. China: Hesign, 2012. Jianping He. ISBN 978-3-9814557-0-0.
- The First Cut: Paper at the Cutting Edge. Manchester: Manchester Art Gallery, 2012. ISBN 9780901673824. Exhibition catalogue.
- Papercut. USA: Rockport, 2014. Owen Gildersleeve. ISBN 978-1592539024.

== Group exhibitions ==
- The First Cut, Manchester Art Gallery, Manchester, 2012/2013; Djanogly Art Gallery, Nottingham, 2013; SeaCity Museum, Southampton, 2014.

== Music videos ==
- "Against The Moon" by Iceage (2014) – directed by Andersen and Kim Thue
- "Blind Spot" by Lush (2016) – directed by Andersen and Kim Thue
- "Wait in the Car" by The Breeders (2017) – by Andersen and Chris Bigg
- "12:36" by Lowly (2019) – directed and filmed by Andersen

== Awards ==
- Going West video animations, winner, Clio Awards in Animation category, Technique entry, Television/Cinema/Digital medium
