= Gala (album) =

Compilation album by Lush
- Released: 13 November 1990
- Recorded: July 1989 – August 1990
- Genres: Shoegaze; dream pop; post-punk; alternative rock
- Length: 46:14
- Labels: 4AD; Reprise; Nippon Columbia
- Producers: Tim Friese-Greene; Robin Guthrie; John Fryer

Lush chronology
Sweetness and Light (1990)	Gala (1990)	Black Spring (1991)

Gala is the debut compilation album by the English alternative rock band Lush, released in 1990 by 4AD as an introduction to the US and Japanese markets, comprising the band's earliest releases in reverse chronological order, plus two additional tracks.

It was released on 13 November 1990 on 4AD/Reprise Records in the United States and 21 November 1990 on 4AD/Nippon Columbia in Japan; the album received a limited-edition release in the United Kingdom on 3 December 1990.

In support of the album, Lush toured in both the US and Japan.

Upon its release, Gala failed to chart, but the album was well received by critics in both the UK and the US. "De-Luxe", which was released as a promotional single in the US, did receive considerable radio airplay and placed in the Billboard Modern Rock Tracks chart.

== Release ==
Gala was compiled by Lush's record label, 4AD, as an introduction to the United States and Japanese markets. The album features the band's debut mini album Scar (1989) and Mad Love and Sweetness and Light extended plays (1990) in reverse chronological order. A cover version of ABBA's 1975 song "Hey Hey Helen"—which had been recorded for an abandoned anti-poll tax compilation—was included, as well as a rerecording of Scar song "Scarlet" that had been previously released on the Melody Maker compilation Gigantic! 2 in March 1990.

Gala was released on 13 November 1990 on 4AD/Reprise in the US and on 21 November on 4AD/Nippon Columbia in Japan. Both releases were only made available on CD. Upon the album's limited release in the United Kingdom on 3 December, it was made available on CD, LP and cassette.

In the US, "De-Luxe" was released as a promotional-only radio single to promote Gala's release; it featured the album version of the track, as well as two separate single edits as its B-side. The song peaked at No. 14 on Billboard's Modern Rock Tracks chart.

To support Gala, Lush commenced two short tours of North America and Japan. The band performed eight dates in North America, beginning at Lee's Palace in Toronto on 24 November 1990 and concluding on 8 December at Club Lingerie in Los Angeles. A sold-out four-date mini tour of Japan followed, with Lush performing two nights at the FM Radio Hall in Tokyo from 11 to 12 December, Muse Hall in Osaka on 14 December and a final show at Club Quattro in Nagoya on 15 December. The tour was well received and Lush were tipped as being "big in Japan", though vocalist/guitarist Miki Berenyi was skeptical of the band's fame, telling Sounds: "People go, 'Ooh you've sold out Japan.' But you don't really fucking know how well you're doing. It could be like some American band saying 'Hey we sold out the [Camden] Falcon!'"

== Music and lyrics ==
According to Ned Raggett of Pitchfork: "Lush were spiky, snarky, and not apt to suffer fools gladly, as Gala songs like “Bitter” and “Leaves Me Cold” underscore on matters personal and passionate. [...] Berenyi and Anderson sung these with sweet individual and harmony performances, adding in odd time signatures and eccentric flourishes."

== Reception ==
Professional ratings
Review scores
Source	Rating
AllMusic	4/5 stars
Chicago Tribune	4/4 stars
NME	8/10
Pitchfork	8.5/10
Q	3/5 stars
Select	4/5
Vox	9/10

Upon its release, Gala was well received by critics. NME writer Terry Staunton rated it 8 out of 10 and said, Gala was a collection of Lush's "two glorious years" and "a delicious starter" for the band, adding "when the initial stocks run out, Gala will clean up in the import shops, as it is undoubtedly one of maybe a dozen (probably less) albums from this year that everyone should own". Writing for Select, Graham Linehan described Gala as "riveting" in his 4-out-of-5 review. He said that "what is surprising is the way in which the EPs that make up the album have fallen together so perfectly" and surmised that "at first it may all seem a little rich, a little too sweet for one long swallow … but give it a moment to catch your breath and it becomes clear that Lush's gameplan involves far more than retracing the steps of acts like the Cocteaus and My Bloody Valentine".

Vox reviewer Susan Corrigan awarded the album a 9-out-of-10 rating and said that "together [Berenyi and Emma Anderson loop hazy vocals through hard-edged fractured melodies, evoking an unstructured sense of bliss even for the most jaded listener". Corrigan further described how Lush's "heady, expansive songs burst out of the vinyl like riotously-coloured musical fractals". David Stubbs wrote a largely warm review in Melody Maker, selecting "De-Luxe" and "Thoughtforms" as Gala's standout tracks and describing how "the guitars glitter like sunshine immediately after the rain".

In The New York Times, Jon Pareles described Gala as featuring guitars "swathed in electronic reverberation and other effects" and overdubbing, and a retrospective 4-out-of-5 review on AllMusic by Andy Kellman praised Lush's ability "to veer from violent and edgy noise breaks to pop effervescence". Kellman noted how the material on Gala was a direct influence on Chapterhouse and (though he criticised the production on the tracks from Mad Love and Sweetness and Light) concluded that Gala was "one of the band's career highlights". In 2016, Pitchfork ranked the album at No. 8 on its list of "The 50 Best Shoegaze Albums of All Time".

== Track listing ==
No.	Title	Writer(s)	Length
1.	"Sweetness and Light" (from Sweetness and Light, 1990)	Emma Anderson	5:19
2.	"Sunbathing" (from Sweetness and Light, 1990)	Anderson	3:09
3.	"Breeze" (from Sweetness and Light, 1990)	Anderson; Miki Berenyi	2:48
4.	"De-Luxe" (from Mad Love, 1990)	Anderson	3:31
5.	"Leaves Me Cold" (from Mad Love, 1990)	Berenyi	2:56
6.	"Downer" (from Mad Love, 1990)	Anderson	2:41
7.	"Thoughtforms" (Second version; from Mad Love, 1990)	Anderson	2:45
8.	"Baby Talk" (from Scar, 1989)	Berenyi	2:18
9.	"Thoughtforms" (Original version from Scar, 1989)	Anderson	2:45
10.	"Scarlet" (Original version from Scar, 1989)	Anderson; Berenyi	3:27
11.	"Bitter" (from Scar, 1989)	Berenyi	2:02
12.	"Second Sight" (from Scar, 1989)	Berenyi	2:40
13.	"Etheriel" (from Scar, 1989)	Anderson; Berenyi	3:25
14.	"Hey Hey Helen" (ABBA cover, 1990)	Benny Andersson; Björn Ulvaeus	2:29
15.	"Scarlet" (Longer version, 1990)	Anderson; Berenyi	3:55
Total length:			46:14

== Personnel ==
All personnel credits adapted from Gala's album notes.

Lush

- Chris Acland – drums
- Emma Anderson – guitar, backing vocals
- Miki Berenyi – vocals, guitar
- Steve Rippon – bass

Additional musicians

- Phil Overhead – percussion (1–3)

Technical personnel

- Tim Friese-Greene – production (1–3)
- Robin Guthrie – production, engineering (4–7, 14, 15)
- John Fryer – production, engineering (8–13)
- Ed Buller – engineering (1–3)
- Lincoln Fong – engineering (4–7)
- Guy Fixsen – engineering (14)

Design personnel

- Vaughan Oliver – design
- Chris Bigg – design
- Jim Friedman – photography

== Release history ==
Region	Date	Format(s)	Label	Distributor	Catalogue
United States	13 November 1990	CD	4AD	Reprise	9 26463–2
Japan	21 November 1990	CD	4AD	Nippon Columbia	COCY-6925
United Kingdom	3 December 1990	Cassette, CD, LP	4AD		CAD 0017
