= Blind Spot (EP) =

EP by Lush
- Released: 15 April 2016
- Recorded: 2015–16
- Studios: Cardeal, São Paulo, Brazil and Lime Green Monkeys, Saffron Walden
- Genres: Indie pop; dream pop; shoegaze
- Length: 14:46
- Label: Edamame
- Producers: Daniel Hunt; Jim Abbiss

Lush chronology
Ciao! Best of Lush (2001)	Blind Spot (2016)

Singles from Blind Spot
- 1. "Out of Control" Released: 15 April 2016

Blind Spot is the fourth and final extended play (EP) by English rock band Lush. Released on 15 April 2016, by the band's record label Edamame, the EP contains the band's first new material since 1996, following their reunion in 2015. It was produced by Jim Abbiss and Ladytron member Daniel Hunt.

== Recording ==
The EP was recorded before the band started rehearsals for their 2015-16 reunion. The first stage involved recording home demos, which were sent to co-producer Hunt, who was in Brazil at the time. The second stage was recorded in co-producer Abbiss's Lime Green Monkey studio.

== Video ==
The music video for the EP's opening track, "Out of Control", was released on 19 February 2016. It was directed by Martin Masai Andersen and Kim Thue.

== Critical reception ==
Professional ratings
Aggregate scores
Source	Rating
Metacritic	76/100
Review scores
Source	Rating
AllMusic	3.5/5 stars
The Independent	3/5 stars
Pitchfork	7.6/10

Blind Spot received generally positive reviews from music critics upon its release. At Metacritic, which assigns a normalized score out of 100 to ratings from publications, the album received a mean score of 76 based on 8 reviews, indicating "generally favourable reviews".

== Track listing ==
All tracks are written by Emma Anderson and Miki Berenyi.

Blind Spot track listing
No.	Title	Length
1.	"Out of Control"	4:22
2.	"Lost Boy"	3:18
3.	"Burnham Beeches"	3:07
4.	"Rosebud"	3:59
Total length:		14:46

== Personnel ==
Lush

- Miki Berenyi – lead vocals, guitar
- Emma Anderson – guitar, backing vocals
- Phil King – bass
- Justin Welch – drums

Additional personnel

- Jim Abbiss – production
- Daniel Hunt – production, backing vocals
- Audrey Riley – string arrangement
- Edd Hartwell – studio engineer

== Charts ==
Chart performance for "Out of Control"
Chart (2016)	Peak position
UK Physical Singles (OCC)	1
