= The Barfly =

British chain of live music venues

Coordinates: 51°32′35″N 0°8′57″W

Barfly, Camden
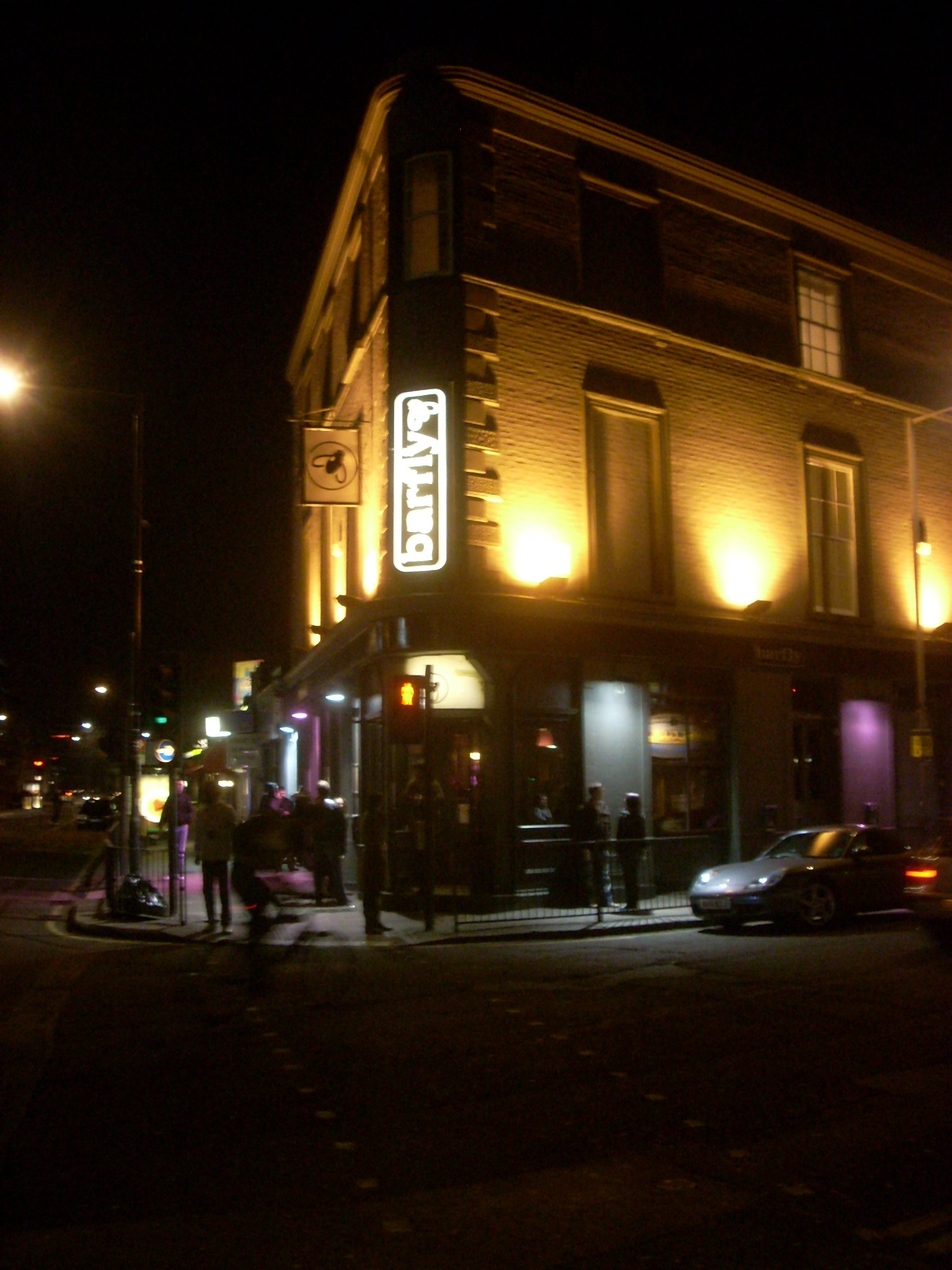
- Interactive map of Barfly, Camden
- Location: Camden Town, London, England
- Owner: Propaganda Independent Venues
- Capacity: 200
- Type: Live Music
- Events: Indie; Rock; Hip hop Pop

Website
- Official website

The Barfly is a pub and live music venues in the United Kingdom originally started by Nick Moore, Jeremy Ledlin and Be Rozzo on Valentine's Day 1997. Club nights and events tended to feature rock, alternative and independent music.

The flagship venue was based in Camden Town, London, England. The premises are still used as a live music venue, which has a capacity of 200.

In December 2025 the venue was purchased by Propaganda Independent Venues who announced they plan to restore the venue to its previous Barfly name.

== Camden venue ==
Prior to 2000, the flagship Camden venue had been known as The Monarch, a pub which had hosted live music gigs since the 1980s. During the 1990s it became a regular venue for Britpop bands. The venue was featured in episode 5 of series 2 of TV series Spaced, which centred around lead characters Tim and Daisy having a night out in Camden.

The Barfly brand began with one club in 1996, originally at The Falcon pub, before moving to The Monarch in 2000, which was then renamed The Barfly, with the old name "The Monarch" being later taken up by another nearby venue, the former Misty Moon.

In May 2016, the Columbo Group purchased the Barfly from its previous owner, MAMA & Company. In June 2016, it closed the venue. After refurbishment, the space has reopened as the Camden Assembly.

On 9 June 2026 it was confirmed that as of 22 June 2026 Barfly would reopen with a special live performance from Frank Turner.

== Other venues ==
A second venue was opened in Cardiff in 2001 with a capacity of 200 people and other venues followed. The Cardiff venue closed in September 2010. Similarly, the Birmingham Barfly closed in the same year.

Until 2003, The Barfly ran a venue in Sheffield in the now defunct National Centre for Popular Music. The venue was initially housed in one "pod" of the building but this was closed down sometime in 2002, moving to what was the Zero Club (later The Plug, then Network) on Matilda Street. The Barfly vacated these premises soon afterwards, and left Sheffield altogether.

On 2 June 2008, the Brighton The Barfly (formerly the Gloucester Nightclub) closed down without notice.

Cambridge Barfly opened in 2007 after the Barfly chain took over The Graduate public house. It had a 250-person capacity, but closed in the Summer of 2008. It was refurbished and became a J D Wetherspoon pub, which later burned down, but has since reopened.

On 17 February 2009, the Glasgow Barfly also closed down without notice.

During late May 2009, Liverpool Barfly was sold to local bar owners and transformed into the Masque Nightclub and music venue. The building also contains The Masque's affiliated bar: Ink, a free-entry rock 'n' roll bar and the only tattoo studio-themed venue in the North West of England.

In 2010, the York Barfly also ceased trading; the venue reopened as Fibbers on 3 September 2010.

The West End of London Barfly venue closed in 2011.

== See also ==
- The Fly (magazine)
