= Scar (Lush album) =

EP by Lush
- Released: 9 October 1989
- Recorded: July 1989
- Studios: Blackwing, London
- Genres: Shoegaze; noise pop
- Length: 16:34
- Label: 4AD
- Producers: John Fryer; Lush

Lush chronology
Scar (1989)	Mad Love (1990)

Scar is a mini-album by English rock band Lush. It was released on 9 October 1989 on 4AD. Originally intended to be a three-track single release, Scar was produced by John Fryer and the band themselves and recorded at London's Blackwing Studios in 1989.

Lush were the subject of considerable attention from the British music press, including NME and Melody Maker, around the time of Scar. The mini album was met with critical acclaim upon release, particularly for its shoegaze style and its unusual songwriting arrangements. Scar's material drew comparisons to several fellow independent artists, including My Bloody Valentine, Sonic Youth and Cocteau Twins.

In support of its release, Lush toured with Pale Saints and Loop, performing a dozen dates on the UK university circuit. Scar was also a moderate commercial success for 4AD, selling over 15,000 copies in its first four months of release and peaking at number three on the UK Independent Albums Chart. It was reissued as part of the compilation album Gala—Scar's original working title—in November 1990.

== Background ==
Lush were formed in 1987 in London by vocalist Meriel Barham, guitarist Emma Anderson, vocalist-guitarist Miki Berenyi, bassist Steve Rippon and drummer Chris Acland. Berenyi had met Barham, Rippon and Acland while all four were attending the Polytechnic of North London; Berenyi and Anderson had been friends since the age of 14 and edited the Alphabet Soup fanzine together. The band performed their first show at the Camden Falcon in London in March 1988, soon after which Barham left and joined Pale Saints; Berenyi subsequently assumed vocal duties.

The band recorded two demo tapes—both consisting of songs that would later appear on Scar—which were sent to various independent record labels, as the band were apprehensive of signing to a major label. Berenyi said that although major labels had shown interest in the band, she thought "if a [major] label takes us, its only gunna be cos there's two girls in the band and they're gonna completely capitalise on that. Which we obviously didn't want at all." 4AD co-founder Ivo Watts-Russell heard Lush's demos and attended a show at the Camden Falcon in April 1989, where both Lush and Pale Saints were performing. Watts-Russell, impressed with Lush and Pale Saints' performances, offered both bands recording contracts; Lush's contract was a five-year and five-album deal.

== Recording ==
For Scar, Lush originally planned for Cocteau Twins guitarist Robin Guthrie to produce the mini album. Anderson contacted Guthrie and provided him with a cassette of Lush's earlier recordings, to which he responded warmly and expressed his interest in working with the band. However, Lush and Guthrie's schedules "couldn't coalesce for Scar", and the band instead decided to work with producer Fryer. Guthrie did produce Lush's subsequent extended play Mad Love in 1990—for which the Scar song "Thoughtforms" was rerecorded at his suggestion—and the band's debut full-length studio album Spooky (1992).

Lush held the recording sessions for Scar at Blackwing Studios in south London in July 1989. The sessions were originally intended to only produce a three-song demo, with "Etheriel" as a potential A-side single release. The band instead recorded three full-form songs ("Baby Talk", "Thoughtforms" and "Scarlet"), and decided on the strength of the recordings to produce a further three songs ("Bitter", "Second Sight" and "Etheriel") to accommodate the release of a mini album.

"Etheriel" (1989)
"Etheriel" features several overdubs of Miki Berenyi's low-mixed vocals and Emma Anderson's clean guitar sound.

An extensive amount of vocal and guitar overdubs were recorded during Scar's sessions, but neither Anderson nor Berenyi spent much time experimenting with their guitar sound as they did on subsequent releases such as Mad Love and Spooky; Anderson said "it was just either clean or distorted—that was it". Following Scar's recording, and reviewing the session's master tapes, Anderson said she considered Scar "like demos" rather than a debut album, but said that the band were still "quite pleased" with the quality of the recordings.

Upon release, Scar's production values drew comparisons to My Bloody Valentine's sound. In response, Rippon said that the mini album's production techniques were "completely derivative in the sense that there's nothing in our music that hasn't been done before", but made the distinction that it was "a different combination of familiar elements" instead of directly emulating another band's sound.

== Composition ==
Scar is a mini album featuring six full-length tracks. Three of its songs ("Baby Talk", "Bitter" and "Second Sight") were written and composed by Berenyi and one ("Thoughtforms") was written and composed by Anderson; the two remaining songs ("Scarlet" and "Etheriel") were joint compositions between Berenyi and Anderson.

It's really difficult now, because we're so sort of used to the idea of writing a song and it's totally your song. And you write every element of it and it becomes a bit difficult now to—I don't know—just offer up a bass line to Steve [Rippon] and let him write it, because you already have a fixed idea of the whole song.

— Miki Berenyi on the songwriting process of Scar, 1990

Scar was described as having a distinctive style, "somewhere between Cocteau Twins and Sonic Youth", as well as "a mix of angelic vocals over subtle guitar trash, of melodies over chaotic rhythms, of haunting whispers over spitting feedback." The mini album's songs were also noted by The Quietus as having "dissonant arrangements" and "swirls of ethereal, narcotic guitar" amidst Berenyi's vocals.

Berenyi attributed the unusual arrangements on Scar to the fact that "none of [Lush's members were] particularly brilliant musicians, certainly at the beginning". She further explained that the band's nature was "quite experimental" and that the songs developed in the studio, with one member often writing other members' song parts and "quite laboriously" attempting to explain how to perform it.

Berenyi's vocals on Scar, described by The Quietus as "submerged girl-next-door vocals", are largely indistinct and deliberately low in the mix, typical of the shoegazing genre. Scar's lyrics, according to the band, are "female rather than feminist" and were described as "perverse or brilliant or funny or even stupid" by Alternative Press. Lush often disregarded suggestions by the British music press that the band's earliest material featured sexual themes, but Berenyi later admitted that "they're all about shagging, but not some heavy metal anthem about great sex … most of them are really cynical stories like losing my virginity."

== Packaging ==
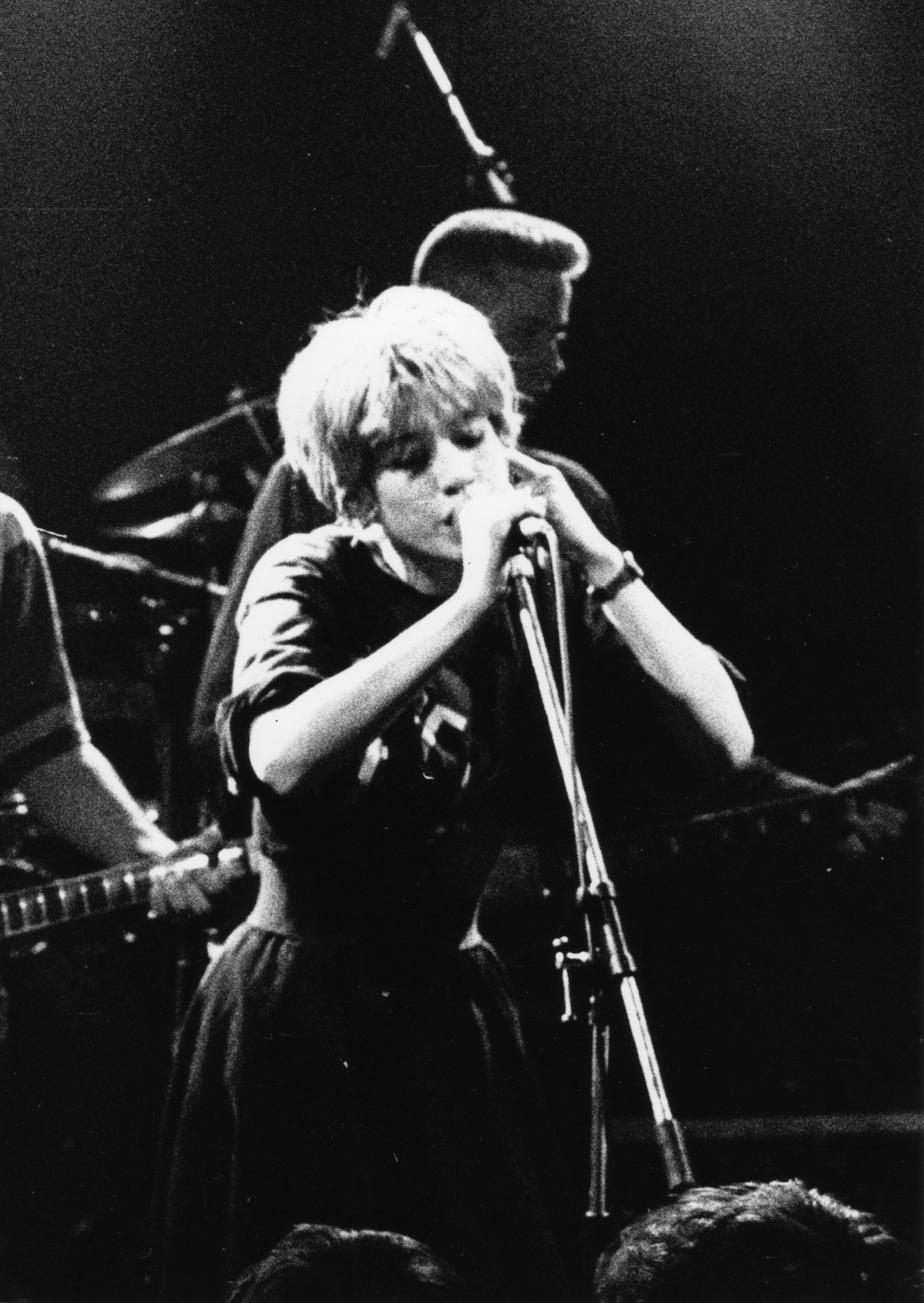
Vocalist Miki Berenyi performing on tour with Pale Saints at l'Ubu in Rennes, France in April 1990

The packaging and sleeve design of Scar was designed by Christopher Bigg and Vaughan Oliver and featured photography by Jim Friedman. The front cover art features alternating shades of several colours, described by Alternative Press as "streaked in pale, pale blue and pink, highlighted by just-slightly-outdated print, lined in bright pinkish-orange." Scar's sleeve design was both commissioned and approved by 4AD without any input from members of Lush.

Scar's interior sleeve contains several drawings and singular words that are deliberately obscured. According to Berenyi, "One says tongue, the other says elder sister, and they sort of meet in the middle." Berenyi described the interior design as "a bit perverse". The run-out matrix codes on the groove of the vinyl pressing of the mini-album feature two similarly obscured messages: "Fanny tits delight" on side 1 and "I'll still fondle you" on side 2.

Originally the mini-album was due to be titled Gala, after Salvador Dalí's wife, Gala Dalí, but Scar was ultimately chosen as the title "because it juxtaposed the image of Lush and highlighted the band's abrasive side", according to Anderson.

== Release ==
Scar was released by 4AD on 9 October 1989 in the UK. It was issued on vinyl, CD and cassette; it was later made available as a digital download. In support of the mini album, Lush began a 12-date national tour. The tour began with a "one-off" show at the Warehouse in Leeds on 27 November 1990, co-headlining with Pale Saints; Lush performed two subsequent headlining shows at the Joiner Arms in Southampton on 28 November and the University of Surrey in Guildford the following day. The following nine dates of the tour, beginning at the University of Hull on 1 December and concluding on 9 December at the Portsmouth Polytechnic, were in support of Loop.

Upon its release Scar placed in the [UK Independent Albums Chart, peaking at No. 3. The mini album entered the chart on 21 October 1989 and remained for a total of 10 weeks. Within four months of its release, Scar sold over 15,000 copies, and the album was reissued as part of the Gala compilation in November 1990.

Remastered versions of "Thoughtforms" and "Etheriel" were included as the final two tracks on Ciao! Best of Lush, a compilation album released in March 2001.

== Critical reception ==
Professional ratings
Review scores
Source	Rating
AllMusic	3.5/5 stars

Scar was well received by critics, in particular by the British alternative music press. NME was hugely favourable, with reviewer Simon Williams referring to Scar as "a work of art" and rating the album 9 out of 10. He described the album as "colourful, contrasting, crafty" and said it was a "unique New Pop blueprint … that cuts it above the competition". A subsequent NME review of Gala said that "Scar swoops and dives between Pixies and early Siouxsie and the Banshees", though it noted that "there is no single word, no single influence" to define the album's sound.

David Stubbs' review of Gala in Melody Maker referred to the songs on Scar as "semi-ethereal, bittersweet confection" and "regular and reliable consignments". Select's review of Gala was particularly favourable of Scar's material; Graham Linehan wrote that "'Thoughtforms' [and] 'Etheriel' [are songs] that nestle in the backbrain and kickstart whatever pleasure circuits you have left", adding that "'Baby Talk' and 'Second Sight' [are] songs that try to get from A to B as quickly and as loudly as possible without trembling to bits". Writing for Vox, Susan Corrigan referred to Scar's songs as "chilly tunes with a warm centre" in a review of Gala, and said that with "Etheriel" and "Thoughtforms", "great things were hinted at … Lush already boasted songs that were worth remembering".

As a result of Scar's widespread critical acclaim, Lush were featured in year-end readers' polls in both Melody Maker and Sounds, tipped as the "Brightest Hope" for music in 1990 in the latter alongside Pixies, the Stone Roses and the Sundays. Scar has since been regarded as one of the most important albums in establishing the shoegazing sound and made Lush one of the first bands to attract the label, though the band were critical of their association with the genre.

== Track listing ==
Side one

1. "Baby Talk" (Miki Berenyi) – 2:18
2. "Thoughtforms" (Emma Anderson) – 2:43
3. "Scarlet" (Anderson, Berenyi) – 3:27

Side two

4. "Bitter" (Berenyi) – 2:02
5. "Second Sight" (Berenyi) – 2:40
6. "Etheriel" (Anderson, Berenyi) – 3:24

== Personnel ==
All personnel credits adapted from Scar's album notes.

Lush

- Miki Berenyi – lead vocals, guitar
- Emma Anderson – guitar, backing vocals
- Steve Rippon – bass
- Chris Acland – drums

Technical personnel

- John Fryer – production, engineering
- Lush – production, engineering

Design personnel

- Christopher Bigg – sleeve design
- Vaughan Oliver – sleeve design
- Jim Friedman – photography

== Charts ==
Chart (1989)	Peak position
UK Independent Albums Chart	3
