= The Fly (magazine) =

British monthly music magazine, 1999–2014

- Editor: JJ Dunning
- Staff writers: JJ Dunning, Lisa Durrant, Hariett Gibsone, Iain Moffat, Polly Rappaport, Alex Lee Thomson
- Categories: Music
- Frequency: monthly
- Publisher: MAMA & Company
- Total circulation: 70,866 (June 2013)
- Founded: 1999
- Final issue: 2014
- Country: United Kingdom
- Language: English
- Website: mamacolive.com/thefly

The Fly was a free music magazine owned by MAMA & Company, published monthly in the United Kingdom.

== Details ==
The magazine started as a listings leaflet in Camden, north London, for the Barfly nights at The Falcon, and later their own music venue on Chalk Farm Road. In 1999 it went national.

Contributors also wrote for other publications including The Guardian Guide, Q magazine, NME, Kerrang! and The Huffington Post.

The magazine had a review section featuring new releases (both singles and albums) and live concert reviews. The remainder of the magazine was typically devoted to articles and interviews with artists generally promoting new releases or tours. The Fly also featured new bands alongside more established acts in the pages of its new bands section, "OnesToWatch", which was sponsored by Levi's until 2010.

The Fly was A5-sized, and distributed around record shops, bars and venues around the United Kingdom. In 2008, the magazine revealed its circulation had increased to 105,212 at a time when many other publications had reported a sharp decline in circulation. The magazine had a history for supporting bands early, having given the likes of Razorlight, Muse, Foals, MGMT and Coldplay their first cover features. By mid-2013 its readership had almost halved to 55,580, in the wake of HMV's widespread store closures.

In March 2014, The Fly announced it had ceased publication. Former editor JJ Dunning claimed in the aftermath of the closure that he would seek new investment for the brand.

== Other media ==
In 2001, a video-offshoot Channel Fly was launched. This would be a pre-recorded video interview with an artist at a Barfly venue prior to a show being played by the same artist later in the evening. One notable interview was in March 2001, where Cliff Jones then of British rock band Gay Dad revealed that he would “Rather relive 1999 in a cave”, despite the critical success the band experienced with their debut album.

The Fly relaunched its website in April 2008 with both a virtual magazine section and an online archive of all previous issues. In Summer 2008, a new feature titled In The Courtyard was launched, in which bands were filmed playing stripped-down versions of songs in the courtyard outside The Fly's office.

The sessions were renamed The Fly Sessions in 2012, when the website was again relaunched.

Bands who have performed so far include Doves, Gaz Coombes, Everything Everything, The Cribs, Noah and the Whale, Warpaint, Black Lips, Dry The River, Badly Drawn Boy, The Kooks, J Mascis, Edwyn Collins, Jake Bugg, Ben Gibbard, Haunts (band) and Low.
