= Pearlies (album) =

Studio album by Emma Anderson
- Released: 20 October 2023
- Recorded: August, 2022 – March, 2023
- Studios: 4AD Studio, London, England, UK; Cubelles Studio, East Sussex, England, UK; Maps HQ, Northamptonshire, England, UK
- Genre: Dream pop
- Length: 38:22
- Language: English
- Label: Sonic Cathedral
- Producer: James Chapman

Emma Anderson chronology
Pearlies (2023)	Spiralèe (Pearlies Rearranged) (2024)

This is the good thing about being a solo artist as opposed to being in a band. I can’t play guitar like Richard Oakes! It was an absolute delight that he said yes. So yes, probably. I think it’s nice to work with other people. Maybe the next album might have more live instruments on as well? I’m thinking about the whole live situation. It will happen, but not this year. Mainly for reasons I’ve already said. I’m a single parent and my daughter’s only 13. But if I do get a live band together then there’s a possibility some of them may be on the next record. Who knows? But collaborations, absolutely. I’d like to have a male vocalist on the next record, doing a duet or something.

— Anderson on recording solo work.

Pearlies is the debut solo album by British rock musician Emma Anderson. It was released on 20 October 2023 through Sonic Cathedral. It has received positive reviews from critics and has been promoted with three music videos and live performances.

== Critical reception ==
Editors at AnyDecentMusic? rated this release a 7.1 out of 10, based on eight reviews. According to the review aggregator Metacritic, Pearlies received "generally favorable reviews" based on a weighted average score of 77 out of 100 from six critic scores.

Editors at AllMusic rated this album 4 out of 5 stars, with critic Tim Sendra writing "the sound of Pearlies isn't far from what one would expect from Anderson" based on her work with Lush and is "very textured and atmospheric, guitar-heavy dream pop with a steady stream of melancholy running through the middle". At The Arts Desk, Kieron Tyler rated this album 4 out of 5 stars, stating that it "does not sound like a Lush album" and is a "very welcome return" for producer James Chapman. In Exclaim!, Eric Hill scored Pearlies 7 out of 10, stating that Chapman "approaches the work with a keen ear for detail, though most of his electronic elements are cleverly bundled and sunken in support of Anderson's glittering guitars and drifting vocals".

Sam Walton of Loud and Quiet scored this album a 7 out of 10, writing that "when it works, though, as it frequently does, Pearlies is genuinely bewitching, reminiscent of the folk-horror sides of Goldfrapp and Broadcast and full of pretty melodies with foreboding underbellies, like TV theme tunes beamed in from an alternate dimension". Phil Mongredien of The Observer gave Pearlies 4 out of 5 stars, characterizing it as "a hypnotic, electro-pop slow-burner" and "a successful enough reinvention for Anderson surely to be wondering why she didn’t make a solo record sooner". In Record Collector, Pearlies received 4 out of 5 stars and critic Terry Staunton compared the work to Cocteau Twins, summing up that it "points to a bright and fulfilling solo future". Another 4 out of 5 stars came from Uncut's Jason Anderson, who states that this music is "quite different than it might’ve been had Anderson developed the ideas and demos she was working on in 2016 into full-fledged Lush songs as she originally intended", as "Anderson continually finds intriguing ways of deviating from those templates" she developed in Lush. Uncut editor Michael Bonner included this album on his list of the best of the year.

At Under the Radar, this was rated the 33rd best album of 2023. This was included in BrooklynVegan's listing of 33 great albums from indie/alternative legends.

== Track listing ==
All songs written by Emma Anderson, with additional writing by James Chapman.

1. "I Was Miles Away" – 5:23
2. "Bend the Round" – 3:27
3. "Inter Light" – 4:38
4. "Taste the Air" – 3:30
5. "Xanthe" – 2:34
6. "The Presence" – 3:36
7. "Willow and Mallow" – 4:08
8. "Tonight Is Mine" – 3:19
9. "For a Moment" – 2:54
10. "Clusters" – 4:56

== Personnel ==
- Emma Anderson – guitar, vocals, backing vocals
- James Chapman – keyboards; additional guitar on "Xanthe", "The Presence", "Tonight Is Mine", "For a Moment", and "Clusters"; arrangement; programming; engineering; mixing at Maps HQ; production
- Marc Jones – cover design, images
- Stuart Jones – cover design, images
- Heba Kadry – mastering
- Sean McGhee – additional production on "Clusters"
- Richard Oakes (guitarist) – electric guitar on "I Was Miles Away", "Bend the Round", "Xanthe", and "Willow And Mallow"; acoustic guitar on "Willow And Mallow"
- Fabian Prynn – additional engineering on "I Was Miles Away", "Bend the Round", "Xanthe", and "Willow And Mallow"
- Brian David Stevens – cover photography

== Charts ==
Chart performance for Pearlies
Chart (2023)	Peak position
Scottish Albums (Official Charts)	48
UK Album Downloads (Official Charts)	35
UK Independent Albums (Official Charts)	19

== See also ==
- 2023 in British music
- List of 2023 albums
