= Tripla (album) =

Studio album by Miki Berenyi Trio
- Released: April 4, 2025
- Studio: Oliver Cherer's home studio (St Leonards-on-Sea); Miki Berenyi and Moose's rehearsal room (North London)
- Genre: Shoegaze; dream pop
- Length: 40:41
- Label: Bella Union
- Producer: Miki Berenyi Trio

Singles from Tripla
- 1. "8th Deadly Sin" Released: 14 January 2025

Tripla is the debut studio album by Miki Berenyi Trio, a shoegaze band composed of English singer Miki Berenyi, former Moose member Kevin "Moose" McKillop, and guitarist Oliver Cherer. It was released on 4 April 2025, by Bella Union.

== Background ==
The album consists of nine songs ranging between three and seven minutes each. The first single of Tripla, "8th Deadly Sin", was released on 14 January 2025, alongside a music video directed by Sébastien Faits-Divers.

== Reception ==
Professional ratings
Aggregate scores
Source	Rating
Metacritic	81/100
Review scores
Source	Rating
Louder Than War	4.5/5 stars
MusicOMH	4/5 stars
Pitchfork	7.0/10
Record Collector	4/5 stars
Under the Radar	8.5/10

At Metacritic, which assigns a normalized rating out of 100 to reviews from mainstream critics, Tripla received an average score of 81 based on seven reviews, indicating "universal acclaim".

Sadie Sartini Garner of Pitchfork remarked in her review of the album, "What keeps Tripla from being the kind of acrid, messy screed that sometimes tempts artists later in their career is the joy with which Berenyi and her bandmates play this music, the sense of wonder that clings to the sadness near the album's core."

Wayne Carey of Louder Than War rated Tripla four and a half stars and commented "MB3 have laid down the gauntlet with this debut, showing there is life in perfect dreampop still to come." Under the Radar described the album as "both resonant and introspective and can be enjoyed at low volume as upbeat morning music or as engaging rock music blasted at full volume," while MusicOMH's John Murphy noted that "Tripla isn't an album that sees Berenyi adopt a radical new direction, but an awful lot of people will be very pleased it exists."

British monthly magazine Record Collector rated the album four stars and stated "On the strength of this fine merger of minds that come together on Tripla, more would be most welcome."

== Track listing ==
All tracks are written by Miki Berenyi Trio.

Tripla track listing
No.	Title	Length
1.	"8th Deadly Sin"	4:59
2.	"Kinch"	4:02
3.	"Vertigo"	4:42
4.	"Gango"	3:17
5.	"A Different Girl"	4:39
6.	"Big I Am"	4:15
7.	"Hurricane"	3:29
8.	"Manu"	6:12
9.	"Ubique"	5:06
Total length:		40:41

== Personnel ==
Credits adapted from the album's liner notes.

=== Miki Berenyi Trio ===
- Miki Berenyi – vocals, guitar, keyboards, programming
- Oliver Cherer – bass, keyboards, programming, trumpet on "Manu"
- Kevin "Moose" McKillop – guitar, keyboards, programming

=== Additional contributors ===
- Paul Gregory – mixing
- Matt Colton – mastering
- Fiona Brice – strings on "Ubique"
- Chris Bigg – design
- Martin Andersen – photography
