= Lush (band) =

English rock band

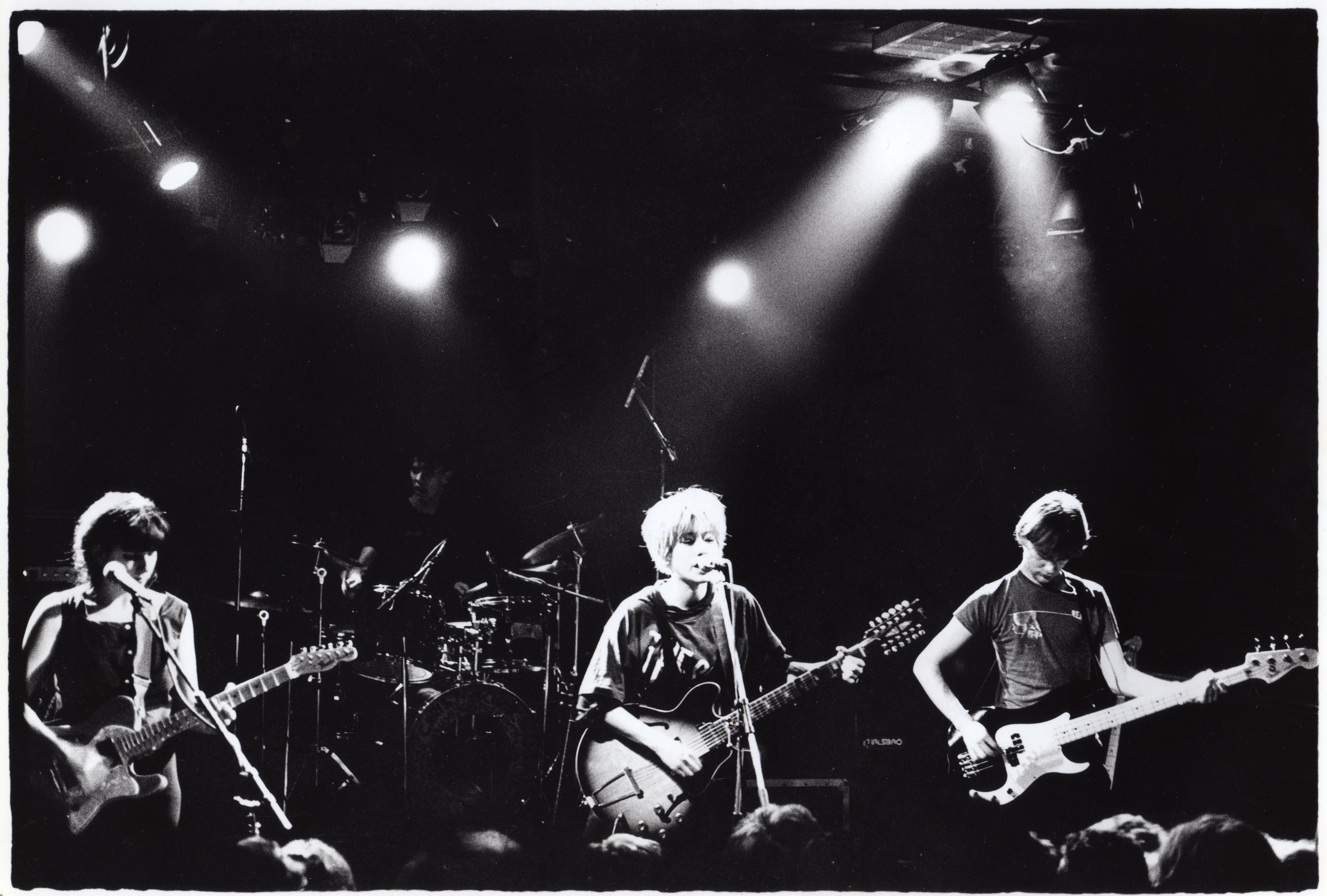
- Lush performing in Rennes, France, 1990

Background information
- Origin: London, England
- Genres: Shoegaze; dream pop; Britpop; noise pop; alternative rock
- Years active: 1987–1996; 2015–2016
- Labels: 4AD; Reprise; Edamame
- Past members: Chris Acland; Emma Anderson; Meriel Barham; Miki Berenyi; Steve Rippon; Phil King; Justin Welch

Lush were an English rock band formed in London in 1987. The original line-up consisted of Miki Berenyi (lead vocals, guitar), Emma Anderson (guitar, vocals), Steve Rippon (bass guitar) and Chris Acland (drums). Phil King replaced Rippon in 1991. They were among the early bands associated with the shoegaze label and became prominent in the 1990s UK independent music scene.

Lush signed to 4AD Records in 1989 and released their debut mini-album Scar that year. Scar and several of the band's early EPs were later compiled into the album Gala (1990). Their subsequent releases included the studio albums Spooky (1992) and Split (1994). The band's final album Lovelife (1996) adopted a more Britpop-oriented sound and became their best-selling album, featuring the band's highest-charting UK singles "Single Girl", "Ladykillers" and "500 (Shake Baby Shake)". Following Acland's death in October 1996, the band went on hiatus before officially announcing their disbandment in 1998.

The band reunited for a short time between 2015 and 2016 with Berenyi, Anderson and King joined by drummer Justin Welch. They toured internationally and released the Blind Spot EP (2016), their first new material since 1996. King departed the band while on tour in October 2016, after which the band announced that they would again disband following the end of the tour, playing their final show the next month. Berenyi and Anderson have since embarked on solo careers.

== History ==
=== Formation and early sound (1987–1988) ===
The band was formed in 1987 in London, initially named the Baby Machines (after a line in the Siouxsie and the Banshees song "Arabian Knights"), with a line-up of Meriel Barham (vocals), Anderson (guitar, vocals), Berenyi (guitar, vocals), Steve Rippon (bass guitar) and Chris Acland (drums). Their influences were diverse; they were inspired by Cocteau Twins, My Bloody Valentine, Siouxsie and the Banshees, the Beach Boys, the Byrds and the garage rock scene of the Nuggets series.

Anderson and Berenyi had been school friends, having known each other since the early 1980s, and together published the Alphabet Soup fanzine. In 1986, Anderson joined the Rover Girls as bass guitarist and Berenyi joined the Bugs, also as a bass guitar player. Neither band lasted long, and in 1987, they joined Barham and Acland in the Baby Machines. Rippon joined shortly thereafter and the band members decided on a change of name to Lush, making their live debut at the Camden Falcon on 6 March 1988. Barham left the band and later joined Pale Saints. Berenyi then took over on lead vocal.

Anderson said of the band's beginnings, "We were kind of punk rock in one way. We did think, 'Well, if they can do it, why the fuck can't we?' Basically, our idea was to have extremely loud guitars with much weaker vocals. And, really, the vocals were weaker due to nervousness – we'd always be going 'Turn them down! Turn them down!'" Berenyi said, "We started by writing crappy riot grrrl anthems... which was probably charming in a juvenile way. But there was a very rapid shift from the minute we started to write for records. The music, the lyrics became much more thoughtful and expressive, more important, really. I remember that change beginning when Emma wrote Thoughtforms, it certainly made me think I needed to get my act together."

=== Scar, EPs and Spooky (1989–1993) ===
In 1989, the band signed to 4AD Records and released their first recording, Scar, a six-track mini-album. Critical praise for Scar and a popular live show established Lush as one of the most written-about groups of the late 1980s/early 1990s UK indie scene. Anderson told Everett True in Melody Maker, "I remember when I couldn't play, I wasn't in a band, didn't know anyone else who could play, and now we've got a record out on 4AD. I sometimes find it impossible to come to terms with what's happening."

Not long after, the British music press tagged them with the "shoegazing" label. The following year, the EPs Mad Love (produced by Robin Guthrie of Cocteau Twins) and Sweetness and Light (produced by Tim Friese-Greene) were released. All three releases were eventually combined into the Gala compilation album, which was produced mainly for the US and Japanese markets. The band recorded a live session for John Peel's BBC Radio 1 show in 1990 and contributed a cover version of "Chirpy Chirpy Cheep Cheep" later that year to the anti-poll tax album Alvin Lives (In Leeds).

The band's profile was raised by extensive touring, including an appearance at the Glastonbury Festival in June 1990 and tours of Japan in late 1990 and the US (with Ride) in the spring of 1991. Preceded by the Black Spring EP issued in October 1991, Lush's first full-length album of completely new material, Spooky, was released in January 1992. Again produced by Guthrie, Spooky featured a sound very similar to Guthrie's band Cocteau Twins, with walls of sound and a great deal of guitar effects. Reviews were mixed and critics of the album held that Guthrie's production brought the sound away from the band's original creative vision, although it sold well, reaching No. 7 in the UK Albums Chart. The album was preceded by the band's first UK top 40 single, "For Love", which was partly re-recorded and remixed by Mark Freegard. He also produced the single's B-sides: the original recording of "Starlust", Wire cover "Outdoor Miner" and the only Lush track with lead vocals by Anderson, "Astronaut". Gil Norton remixed "Superblast!" for the Japanese single release.

Rippon left the band after recording the "For Love" EP to concentrate on writing, though his book Cold Turkey Sandwich — a fictionalised chronicle of his time touring — was rejected by publishers. He was replaced by Phil King. During the summer of 1992, Lush toured America as part of the second edition of the Lollapalooza festival. Lush were added to the roster by Lollapalooza organiser Perry Farrell, the Jane's Addiction/Porno for Pyros frontman, who personally requested Lush.

=== Split, Lovelife and break-up (1994–1997) ===
Lush approached Bob Mould to produce their second album. The band stated that Mould was too busy to produce them, but Mould said in a Spin article that he backed out because "I kept picking the wrong girl's songs... I had to get out before I broke up the band!" The band found completing Split frustrating. It was recorded by Mike Hedges at Rockfield Studios in Wales. Then Hedges along with the band went to mix the recordings, first at Abbey Road Studios, and then at Hedges' studio in Domfront, France. However, neither the band nor Ivo Watts-Russell of their label 4AD were satisfied with the sound; eventually Alan Moulder was hired to remix it. Unusually, the band released two EPs from the album ("Hypocrite" and "Desire Lines") both on the same day (30 May 1994). Neither single broke into the UK Top 40. Released on 13 June 1994, Split was less successful than Spooky.

The band concentrated on the American market, on the advice of their management, but failed to make a breakthrough. A third EP from "Split", planned for release in the autumn of 1994, was to have featured "Lovelife" as the lead track along with a version of "The Childcatcher" recorded during the "Split" sessions; but the release was shelved by management. This first version of "The Childcatcher" was released three times: on the Secret Tracks 2 free cassette included in the May 1994 issue of Select magazine, on the 4AD compilation All Virgos Are Mad and as part of the double 7" compilation EP From Greer to Eternity, issued on Fierce Panda Records later that year. They suffered further setbacks when tours of Japan and the UK were cancelled. They decided to break from their manager, Howard Gough, and begin work on a new album. However, the new management also prioritised achieving success in America.

Lovelife, the band's fourth album, was released in March 1996. It was produced by Pete Bartlett, the band's live engineer. Lovelife represented a change in production, with less reliance on heavy guitar effects. It became the biggest seller of their career, possibly as it was more in step with the contemporary Britpop style. Lovelife included the hit singles "Single Girl", "Ladykillers" and "500 (Shake Baby Shake)", and featured Jarvis Cocker of Pulp duetting with Berenyi on the song "Ciao!".

Instead of capitalising on their success in the UK, the band's management sent them on an ill-conceived American tour with the Gin Blossoms. With the band members feeling pressured and tired, Anderson discussed leaving. She stated she could not make another Lovelife but would rather make a smaller, more personal album. The other band members were amenable to this idea, with Berenyi, in particular, being keen to keep the band together.

In September 1996, the band played their last performance, prior to reuniting, in Japan. A month later, drummer Acland died by hanging himself in his parents' garden on 17 October. The band went on an extended hiatus, officially announcing their break-up on 23 February 1998.

=== Post-breakup (1998–2014) ===
Berenyi went on to work as a production editor at two major magazine publishers. In 1998, Anderson formed a new group, Sing-Sing, with singer Lisa O'Neill. Sing-Sing released two full-length albums, but in January 2008, announced they were disbanding. Anderson lived in Hastings and has held various jobs in the music business in management, PR, accountancy and at a booking agency. King played bass for the Jesus and Mary Chain and also worked for Uncut magazine as a picture researcher.

=== Reformation and second break-up (2015–2016) ===
In September 2015, the music press suggested a reunion might be planned after Anderson posted a cryptic "7 day." message on social media and an official band website appeared. On 28 September, Lush announced their reunion on their Facebook page. The reunited band consisted of Anderson, Berenyi and King with the addition of Justin Welch (Elastica) on drums, an old friend of Chris Acland's.

We wish it could have been sooner but, for many years, it was just too painful to contemplate without Chris, and then all kinds of life-changing commitments made it impossible. Now, at last, the three of us are in the right place at the right time to play music together again.

To celebrate their return, 4AD released a limited red vinyl double LP of their compilation Ciao! Best of Lush on 7 November 2015, followed on 11 December by Chorus, a CD-only, 5-disc box set containing almost all of their released material along with a selection of rarities, radio sessions and demos. For Record Store Day 2016, 4AD released a limited edition 5-LP colour vinyl box set titled Origami, comprising Gala (clear vinyl), Spooky (silver vinyl), Split (red vinyl), Lovelife (pink vinyl) and the first vinyl release of the Canadian version of Topolino (yellow vinyl), with revised artwork by Chris Bigg. The UK/European version was packaged in a white cardboard "pizza box" emblazoned with three different Lush logos from 1990, 1994 and 1996.

Lush also announced a show at the Roundhouse in London on 6 May 2016, and later added a second date, 7 May 2016, after the first show sold out in six hours. They alluded to further dates in North America, confirmed on 19 January 2016 when their first North American tour in 20 years was announced.

On 15 April 2016, the band announced the release of the Blind Spot EP, the band's first new material since 1996. It was produced by Jim Abbiss and Ladytron member Daniel Hunt. On 18 October 2016, the band announced the departure of bassist King on their official website. On 15 November 2016, Lush issued a statement announcing that Michael Conroy of Modern English would play bass for the final show at Manchester Academy, and confirming the band would split after the show.

It's been a fantastic year for Lush. We received an incredible reception to our Blind Spot EP and the three beautiful career-spanning 4AD releases, sold out two Roundhouse shows, toured North America with great success and had a ball at our European festival appearances. It's been wonderful to revisit our old music and to create new material. However, it is now time for us to return to our families and homes, and bring our time together as a band to a close. We offer heartfelt thanks to all our fans – this reunion would never have happened without your overwhelming support and dedication.

=== Recent developments (2018–present) ===
In September 2018, the formation of a new band, Piroshka, was announced; a quartet composed of Berenyi, Welch, Conroy and former Moose member K.J. "Moose" McKillop. Their debut album, Brickbat, was released by Bella Union on 15 February 2019. A second album, Love Drips and Gathers, followed on 23 July 2021.

Lovelife was one of the albums jointly listened to by followers of #TimsTwitterListeningParty with accompanying written commentary in the form of tweets by Berenyi on 14 May 2020, during the COVID-19 pandemic.

On 29 September 2022, Berenyi's memoir Fingers Crossed, which included her account of Lush's story, was published by Nine Eight Books. Berenyi promoted the book with live author talks as well as a set of performances in 2023 under the name Miki Berenyi Trio opening for Gang of Four.

On 11 August 2023, 4AD released new vinyl pressings of Spooky, Split and Lovelife.

On 20 October 2023, Anderson's debut solo album Pearlies was released by Sonic Cathedral.

On 4 April 2025, Miki Berenyi Trio released an album titled Tripla through Bella Union.

== Members ==
- Emma Anderson – guitar, vocals (1987–1996, 2015–2016) percussion, melodica (1996)
- Miki Berenyi – guitar, vocals (1987–1996, 2015–2016) percussion, melodica (1996)
- Steve Rippon – bass (1987–1992)
- Chris Acland – drums, percussion, guitars (1987–1996; died 1996)
- Meriel Barham – vocals (1987–1988)
- Phil King – bass (1992–1996, 2015–2016) vocals (1996)
- Justin Welch – drums, percussion (2015–2016)

== Discography ==
=== Studio albums ===
Title	Album details	Peak chart positions					
Title	Album details	UK	UK Indie	AUS	NL	SWE	US
Spooky	Released: 27 January 1992; Label: 4AD (CAD 2002); Format: LP (12" and double 10"), CD, cassette	7	13	–	68	–	–
Split	Released: 13 June 1994; Label: 4AD (CAD 4011); Format: LP, CD, cassette	19	12	–	–	–	195
Lovelife	Released: 18 March 1996; Label: 4AD (CAD 6004); Format: LP, CD, cassette	8	14	100	–	41	189

=== Mini albums ===
Title	Album details	Peak chart positions					
Title	Album details	UK	UK Indie	AUS	NL	SWE	US
Scar	Released: 9 October 1989; Label: 4AD (JAD 911); Format: LP, CD, cassette	–	3	–	–	–	–

=== Compilations ===
Title	Album details
Gala	Released: 13 November 1990 (US), 21 November 1990 (JPN), 3 December 1990 (UK); Label: Reprise (926463-2), Nippon Columbia (COCY-6925), 4AD (CAD 0017); Format: LP, CD, cassette
Cookie	Released: December 1994 (JPN); Label: Nippon Columbia (COCY-78365); Format: CD
Topolino	Released: August 1996 (JPN), August 1997 (CAN); Label: Nippon Columbia (COCY-80351), PolyGram/4AD (76974 2110 2); Format: CD
Ciao! Best of Lush	Released: 19 March 2001; Label: 4AD (CAD 2K22); Format: 2LP, CD
Chorus	Released: 11 December 2015; Label: 4AD (LUSHBOX1); Format: 5-CD box set
Origami	Released: 16 April 2016; Label: 4AD (LUSHBOX2); Format: 5-LP box set

=== Singles and EPs ===
Title	Details	Peak chart positions		Album
Title	Details	UK	US Alt.	Album
Mad Love	Released: 26 February 1990; Label: 4AD (BAD 0003); Format: 12", CD, cassette	55	–	Non-album single
Sweetness and Light	Released: 15 October 1990; Label: 4AD (BAD 0013); Format: 12", 7", CD, cassette	47	4	Gala
"De-Luxe"	Released: March 1991; Label: 4AD/Reprise (PRO-CD-4662); Format: Radio promo CD	–	14	Gala
Black Spring	Released: 7 October 1991; Label: 4AD (BAD 1016); Format: 12", 7", CD, cassette	–	–	Spooky
"Nothing Natural"	Released: 29 October 1991 (US); Label: 4AD/Reprise (9 40231-2); Format: CD	43	22	Spooky
"For Love"	Released: 30 December 1991; Label: 4AD (BAD 2001); Format: 12", 10", CD, cassette	35	9	Spooky
"Superblast!"	Released: February 1992; Label: 4AD/Reprise (PRO-CD-5471); Format: Radio promo CD	–	–	Spooky
"Hypocrite"	Released: 30 May 1994; Label: 4AD (BAD 4008); Format: 12", 7", CD	52	–	Split
"Desire Lines"	Released: 30 May 1994; Label: 4AD (BAD 4010); Format: Format: 12", 7", CD	63	–	Split
"Single Girl"	Released: 8 January 1996; Label: 4AD (BAD 6001); Format: 7", CD (Note: Two CD versions were released of this single. Each version includes different B-side tracks.)	21	–	Lovelife
"Ladykillers"	Released: 26 February 1996; Label: 4AD (BAD 6002); Format: 7", CD	22	18	Lovelife
"500 (Shake Baby Shake)"	Released: 15 July 1996; Label: 4AD (BAD 6009); Format: 7", CD	21	–	Lovelife
Blind Spot	Released: 15 April 2016; Label: Edamame (BEAN-01 CD); Format: 10", CD	– (Note: Blind Spot did not enter the Official Singles Chart, but it peaked at number 1 on the Official Physical Singles Chart.)	–	Non-album singles
Live at KCRW – Morning Becomes Eclectic	Released: 28 November 2016; Label: Thoughtforms (TFCD0001); Format: CD (limited release)	–	–	Non-album singles

==== Non-album tracks included on singles and EPs ====
Non-album tracks:

- Mad Love EP: "De-Luxe" 3:26 / "Leaves Me Cold" 2:55 / "Downer" 2:39 / "Thoughtforms" 2:43
- "Sweetness and Light" [b/w "Sunbathing" 2.47 / "Breeze" 3.09]
- Black Spring EP: "Nothing Natural" 5:58 / "Fallin' in Love" 2:44 / "God's Gift" 4:13 / "Monochrome" 5:08]
- "For Love" [b/w "Starlust" 4:21 / "Outdoor Miner" 2:46 / "Astronaut" 2:37]
- "Hypocrite" [b/w "Love at First Sight" 5:12 / "Cat's Chorus" 3:23 / "Undertow (Spooky Remix)" 9:13
- "Desire Lines" [b/w "White Wood" 4:14 / "Girl's World" 4:56 / "Lovelife (Suga Bullit Remix)" 8:15
- "Single Girl" CD1 [b/w: "Tinkerbell" 3:06 / "Outside World" 4:05 / "Cul de Sac" 3:39]
- "Single Girl" CD2 [b/w: "Pudding" 3:56 / "Demystification" 3:39 / "Shut Up" 3:46]
- "Single Girl" 7" [b/w "Sweetie" 2:39]
- "Ladykillers" CD1 [b/w: "Matador" 3.01 / "Ex" 3.14 / "Dear Me (Miki's 8-Track Home Demo)" 3.06]
- "Ladykillers" CD2 [b/w: "Heavenly" 2:53 / "Carmen" 3:19 / "Plums And Oranges" 6:19]
- "Ladykillers" 7" [b/w "I Wanna Be Your Girlfriend" 3:19]
- "500 (Shake Baby Shake)" CD1 [b/w: "I Have the Moon" 3:52 / "Piledriver" 3:07 / "Olympia (Acoustic Version)" 3:16]
- "500 (Shake Baby Shake)" CD2 [b/w: "I'd Like to Walk Around in Your Mind" 2:19 / "Kiss Chase (Acoustic Version)" 2:54 / "Last Night (Hexadecimal Dub Mix)" 6:31]
- Blind Spot EP: "Out of Control" 4.22 / "Lost Boy" 3.18 / "Burnham Beeches" 3:07 / "Rosebud" 3:59

=== Other appearances ===
- "Chirpy Chirpy Cheep Cheep" was included on Alvin Lives (In Leeds) Anti Poll Tax Trax, released in 1990 by Midnight Music.
- "Tiny Smiles" was included on the Volume Two compilation, released by Volume in November 1991.
- A live version of "Starlust", recorded on the NME Stage at the Glastonbury Festival on 27 June 1992, was included on In a Field of Their Own, released in 1992.
- A demo version of "Desire Lines" was included on The 13 Year Itch compilation, released in 1993 by 4AD.
- The original 1993 recording of "The Childcatcher" was included on the All Virgos Are Mad compilation, released in 1994 by 4AD.
- A demo version of "Tinkerbell" was included on the Volume Ten compilation, released in 1994 by RTM/Pinnacle.
- "All This Useless Beauty", an Elvis Costello cover, appeared on the 1996 Elvis Costello & the Attractions maxi-single for "Distorted Angel".
- "Undertow (The Spooky Mix)" was included on the Doom Generation soundtrack, released in 1995 by Warner Bros.
- Lush recorded a cover of Wire's "Mannequin" for the 1996 tribute album Whore: Various Artists Play Wire, and their cover of that band's "Outdoor Miner" appeared on the 2004 tribute album A Houseguest's Wish.
- "I Have the Moon" was included on Nowhere: Music from the Gregg Araki Movie, released in 1997 by Mercury Records.
- "An instrumental version of "Light from a Dead Star" and "Desire Lines" were included on the soundtrack to Joyride, released in 1997 by 4AD/Warner Bros.
- "Last Night (Darkest Hour Mix)" was included on the soundtrack for City of Industry, released in 1997 by Polygram.
- "Sweetness and Light (The Orange Squash Mix)", remixed by My Bloody Valentine, was included on the Splendor soundtrack, released in 1999 by Astralwerks.
- "Undertow" was used in the 2002 Levi's commercial "Atlas Bakery".
- An instrumental version of "Light from a Dead Star" appeared in the trailer for the 2002 movie Solaris.
- "Monochrome" was included on Late Night Tales: The Flaming Lips, compiled by the Flaming Lips and released in 2005 by Azuli Records.
- The Sing-Sing version of "Sunbathing" was included on the compilation Never Lose That Feeling Volume Two, released in 2005 by Club AC30 Records.
- "Sweetness and Light" was included on Sci-Fi-Lo-Fi Vol. 3 (Shoegazing 1985 – 2009), compiled by Rob Da Bank and released by Soma Records in 2009.
- "Ladykillers" was included on the soundtrack for the video game NCAA Football 06.
- "De-Luxe" and "Sweetness and Light" were included as playable tracks, available for download, in the Rock Band series of video games.
- "Monochrome" was included on the soundtrack for the video game Mixtape.
