= The Falcon, Camden =

Former pub and music venue in London, England

Coordinates: 51°32′36″N 0°08′22″W

The Falcon
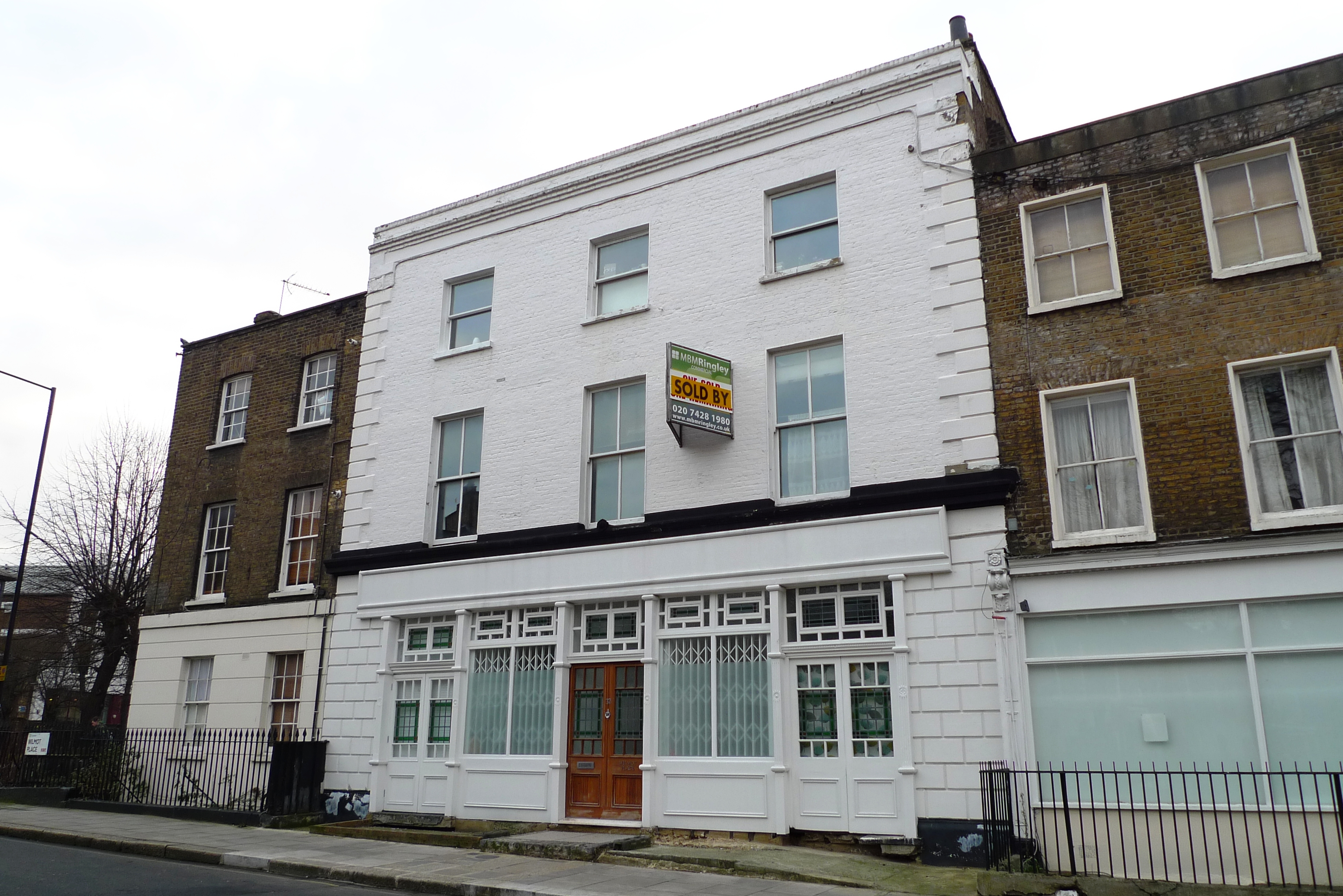
- A photo of the pub from 2012, closed and converted to a residential property.
- Interactive map of The Falcon
- Location: 234 Royal College Street, Camden Town, London, NW1
- Capacity: 150

Construction
- Closed: 2002

The Falcon, later The Camden Falcon, was a pub and music venue located at 234 Royal College Street, in the London Borough of Camden, North London. The pub went from hosting low-key gigs in the late 1980s to becoming one of the most influential music venues of the 1990s, and a hub of London's Britpop and Shoegaze scenes. In November 1997 American music magazine Billboard referred to the pub as being one of a few in the area that can "arguably take some of the credit for the rebirth of British rock in the mid-'90s".

== History ==
=== 19th century ===
A pub on that spot dates back to at least the late 19th century. In 1896 a pub by this name listed at 234 'Great College Street' (the former name of Royal College Street, prior to the Veterinary College there being awarded royal charter) had an accepted tender "for alterations" reported in the construction trade periodical The Builder. London's Lost Pubs by Sam Cullen states it opened as the Falcon in the mid-1850s.

=== 20th century ===
The pub went from hosting low-key gigs in the late 1980s to becoming one of the most influential music venues of the 1990s, and a hub of London's Britpop and Shoegaze scenes. During this time it was owned by Baxter Mitchell and Alexis Hunter. It was also a fringe theatre for a short period.

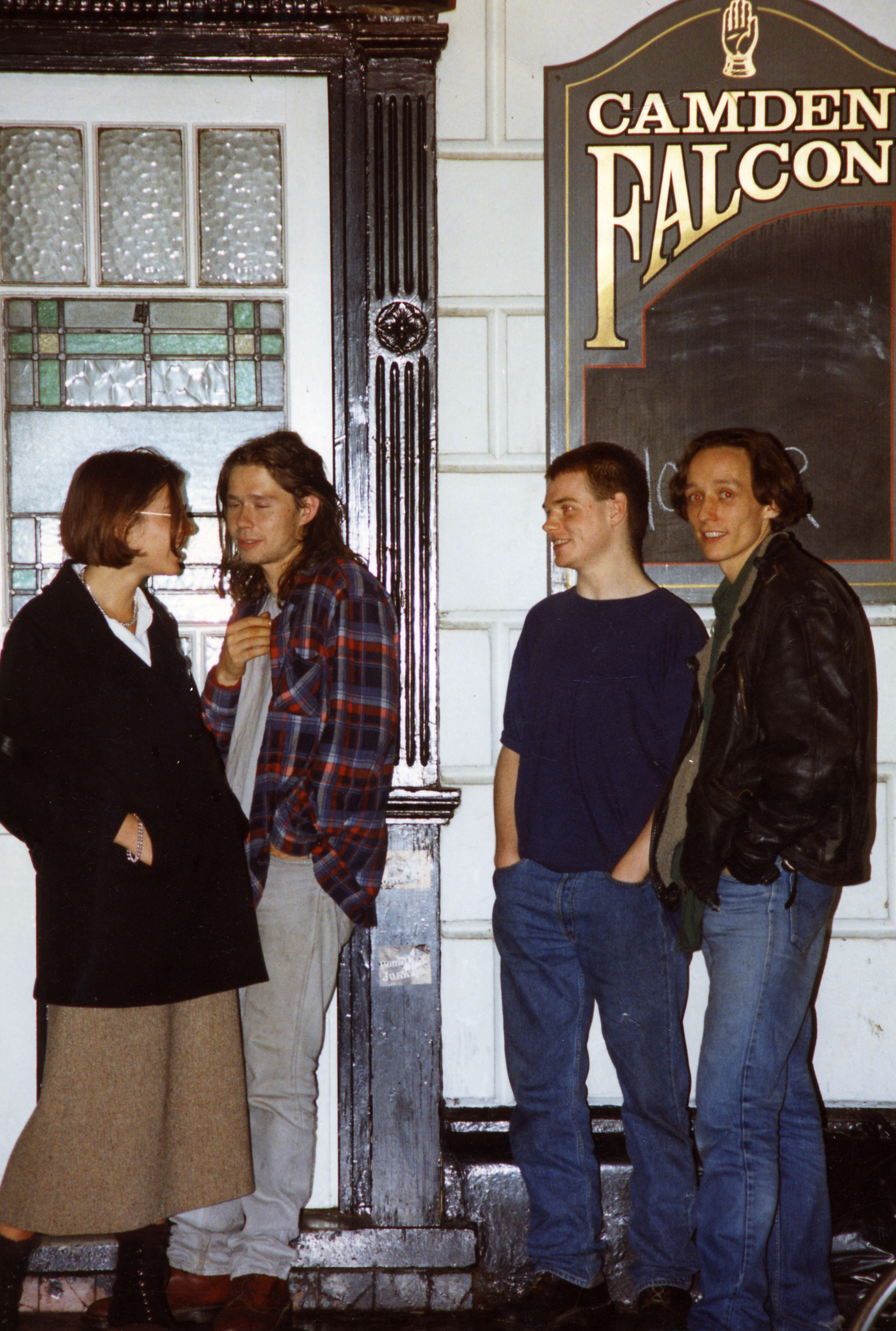
The band Hopper outside the pub.

Bands and musicians such as Blur (then named Seymour), Pulp, Lush, Slowdive, Inspiral Carpets, Suede, The Stereophonics, Feeder, Doves, PJ Harvey, Travis, Muse, Catatonia, Teenage Fanclub, and Coldplay all played there early in their careers.

It was also a key venue for what journalists dubbed the Camden Lurch scene, a term they used to describe the preponderence of non-shoegaze or dance music indie bands that often played in the area, such as Silverfish and Th' Faith Healers.

The Sundays and Lush played their first concerts there (on separate occasions) in 1988. In February 1990, Galaxie 500 played a hastily arranged gig at the pub after the London date of The Sundays' headline tour, on which they were support, had to be postponed.

The Verve's second time performing in London was at the pub. On 22 October 1993, after signing to Creation Records and Sony at the latter's headquarters, Oasis went to Whiteout's concert at The Falcon at which they played an unplanned and shambolic set.

The Barfly originally started as a series of concerts there, with disputes with the local authorities about crowd capacity eventually leading it to move to the Monarch in nearby Chalk Farm. The founders of The Barfly also started The Fly magazine, initially as a listings leaflet for their own events. Their offices were above The Falcon until 1997, when a fire was caused by an employee staying in the office during a power cut falling asleep with a candle still lit.

In November 1997 American music magazine Billboard referred to the pub as being one of a few in the area that can "arguably take some of the credit for the rebirth of British rock in the mid-'90s".

== Label signings after concerts ==
Ivo Watts-Russell signed Lush and Pale Saints to 4AD after seeing them both on the same bill there in 1989.

Heavenly's second time performing was at the pub, supporting The Television Personalities, and it was there that Sarah Records offered to release the band's recordings.

Creation Records co-founder Alan McGee's first time seeing Super Furry Animals was at the pub in 1995, after being brought there by the label's A&R Mark Bowen, this led to the label signing the band.

Simon Williams first approached Coldplay about releasing on Fierce Panda Records upon seeing them play at The Falcon in 1998.

== See also ==
- The Barfly
