= Emma Anderson =

English singer-songwriter and musician (born 1967)

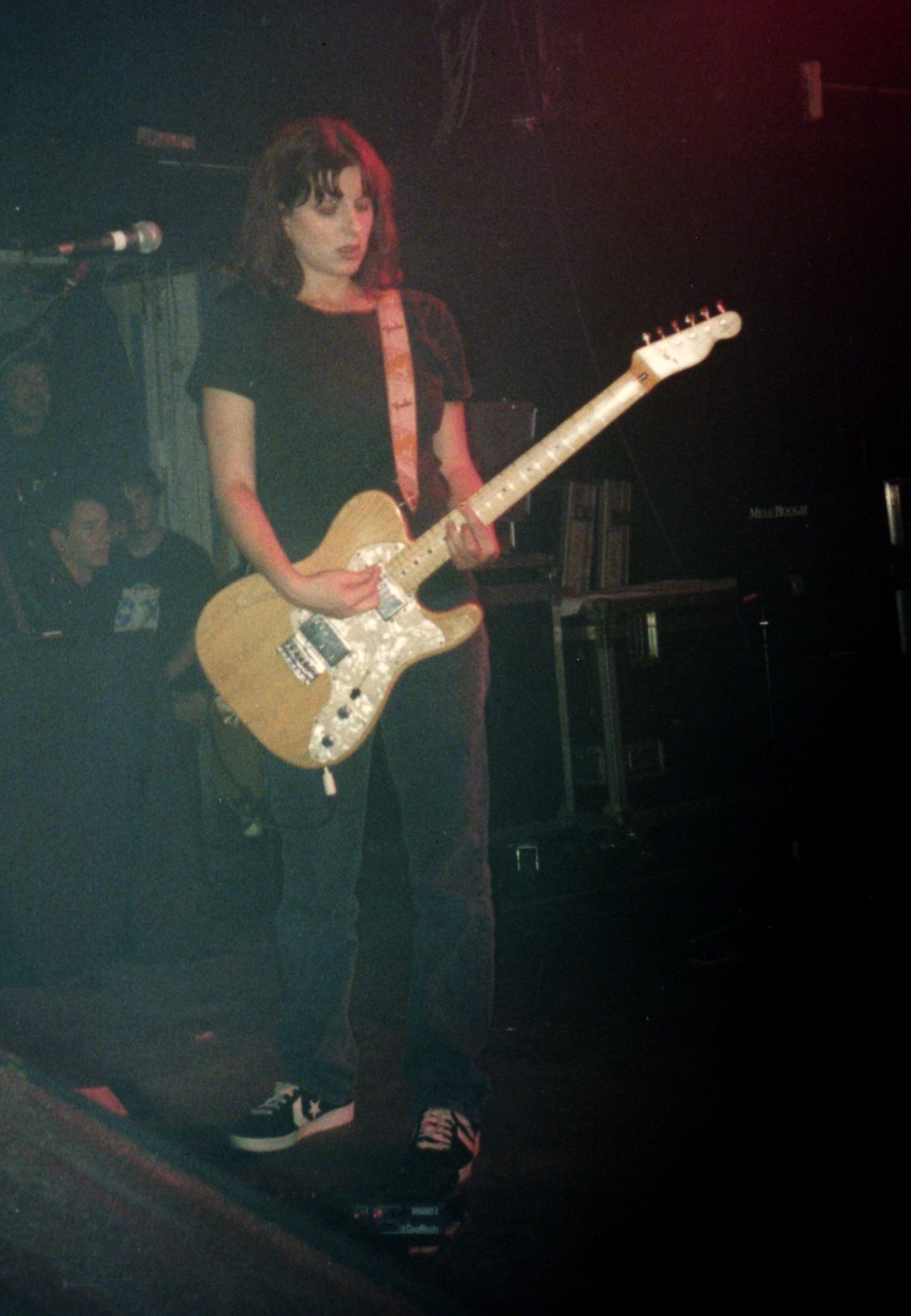
- Anderson at the Markthalle Hamburg in 1994

Background information
- Born: Emma Victoria Jane Anderson; 10 June 1967 (age 58); Wimbledon, London, England
- Genres: Alternative rock; shoegaze
- Instruments: Guitar; vocals; percussion; melodica
- Years active: 1987–2005, 2015–present
- Labels: 4AD; Aerial; Sonic Cathedral
- Formerly of: Lush; Sing-Sing

Emma Victoria Jane Anderson (born 10 June 1967) is an English musician. She is a songwriter, and was guitarist and singer in the shoegazing/Britpop band Lush.

== Early life ==
Born in Wimbledon, London, the adopted daughter of a former army officer who ran a gentleman's club in Piccadilly, Anderson attended several schools before taking her O-Levels at Queen's College, where she met Miki Berenyi. As keen music fans, they wrote a fanzine called Alphabet Soup.

== Musical career ==
Anderson's first band, which she joined in 1986, was the Rover Girls (which featured Chris P Mowforth and Stuart Watson, who were both later in Silverfish) as a bass player.

In 1987, while Anderson was at Ealing College of Higher Education studying Humanities and Berenyi was at North London Polytechnic, they formed Lush. Lush played their very first performance at the Camden Falcon in London on 6 March 1988. They went on to reasonable success, having a number of Top 40 hits over an eight-year career. Anderson told Everett True in Melody Maker, "I remember when I couldn't play, I wasn't in a band, didn't know anyone else who could play, and now we've got a record out on 4AD. I sometimes find it impossible to come to terms with what's happening." Anderson and Berenyi were the only women to take part in the 1992 Lollapalooza tour of the United States.

Anderson and Berenyi became major music press celebrities as part of The Scene That Celebrates Itself. Music magazines the NME and Melody Maker gleefully reported their social activities on a regular basis, which could be said to overshadow their increasingly strong songwriting. As drummer Chris Acland stated, "people seem to want to talk about Lush's relationship to the press more than they want to talk about Lush."

Of the sound of Lush, Emma said, "We were kind of punk rock in one way. We did think 'Well, if they can do it, why the fuck can't we?' Basically, our idea was to have extremely loud guitars with much weaker vocals. And, really the vocals were weaker due to nervousness – we'd always be going 'Turn them down! Turn them down!'."

After their biggest hits, the Top 30 "Single Girl", "Ladykillers" and "500 (Shake Baby Shake)" and Top 10 album Lovelife, the band's drummer Chris Acland took his own life in 1996. The members were devastated and they split in 1996. Lush officially announced their breakup on 23 February 1998.

While a member of Lush, Anderson also worked with Drum Club contributing vocals and guitar on "Spaced Out Locked In" on their 1993 album Everything Is Now, also playing guitar on "Sound System".

In 1997, Anderson formed a new band with vocalist Lisa O'Neill, Sing-Sing. Emma explained how it started, "I just started writing songs not really knowing what was going to happen though I kind of knew I didn't want to form another 4-piece indie band. I demoed those songs for 4AD with myself singing but was dropped but I wasn't fazed. I then met Lisa O'Neill via a guy I was going out with at the time. She had worked with Mark Van Hoen whom funnily enough, someone I knew said, was looking for collaborators so it kind of all fell into place and Sing-Sing was born." They released two albums – The Joy of Sing-Sing in 2001 and Sing-Sing and I in 2005, before officially disbanding on New Year's Day 2008.

Anderson joined in reforming Lush in 2015, releasing a four-track EP, Blind Spot, in early 2016.

In July 2023 it was announced that Anderson's debut solo album Pearlies would be released on 20 October 2023 through label Sonic Cathedral. A remix album, Spiralée (Pearlies Rearranged), was released on 18 October 2024.

== Discography ==
=== Lush ===
- Scar (mini-LP) – October 1989
- Gala - November 1990
- Spooky – January 1992
- Split – June 1994
- Lovelife – March 1996
- Blind Spot EP – April 2016

=== Sing-Sing ===
- The Joy of Sing-Sing – 2001
- Sing-Sing and I – 2005

=== Solo ===
- Pearlies – 2023
- Spiralée: Pearlies Rearranged – 2024
