= Miki Berenyi =

English musician (born 1967)

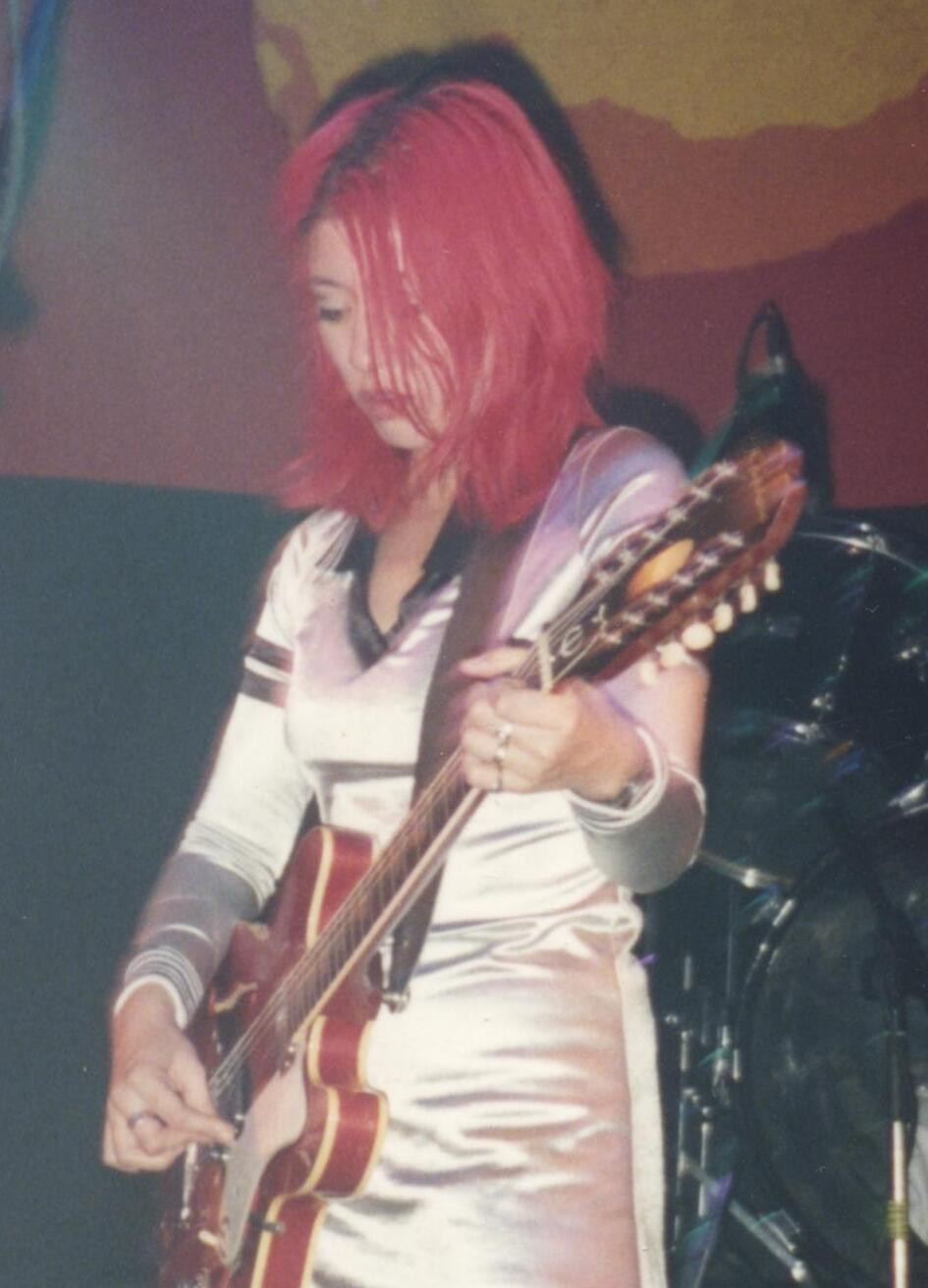
- Berenyi on stage in 1994

Background information
- Born: Miki Eleonora Berenyi; 18 March 1967 (age 59); Chelsea, London, England
- Genres: Alternative rock; shoegaze
- Occupation: Musician
- Instruments: Vocals; guitar; percussion; melodica
- Years active: 1987–1998, 2015–present
- Member of: Piroshka; Miki Berenyi Trio
- Formerly of: Lush

Miki Eleonora Berenyi (born 18 March 1967) is an English singer and guitarist. She is a member of Piroshka and the Miki Berenyi Trio, and is best known as a member of the alternative rock band Lush.

== Biography ==
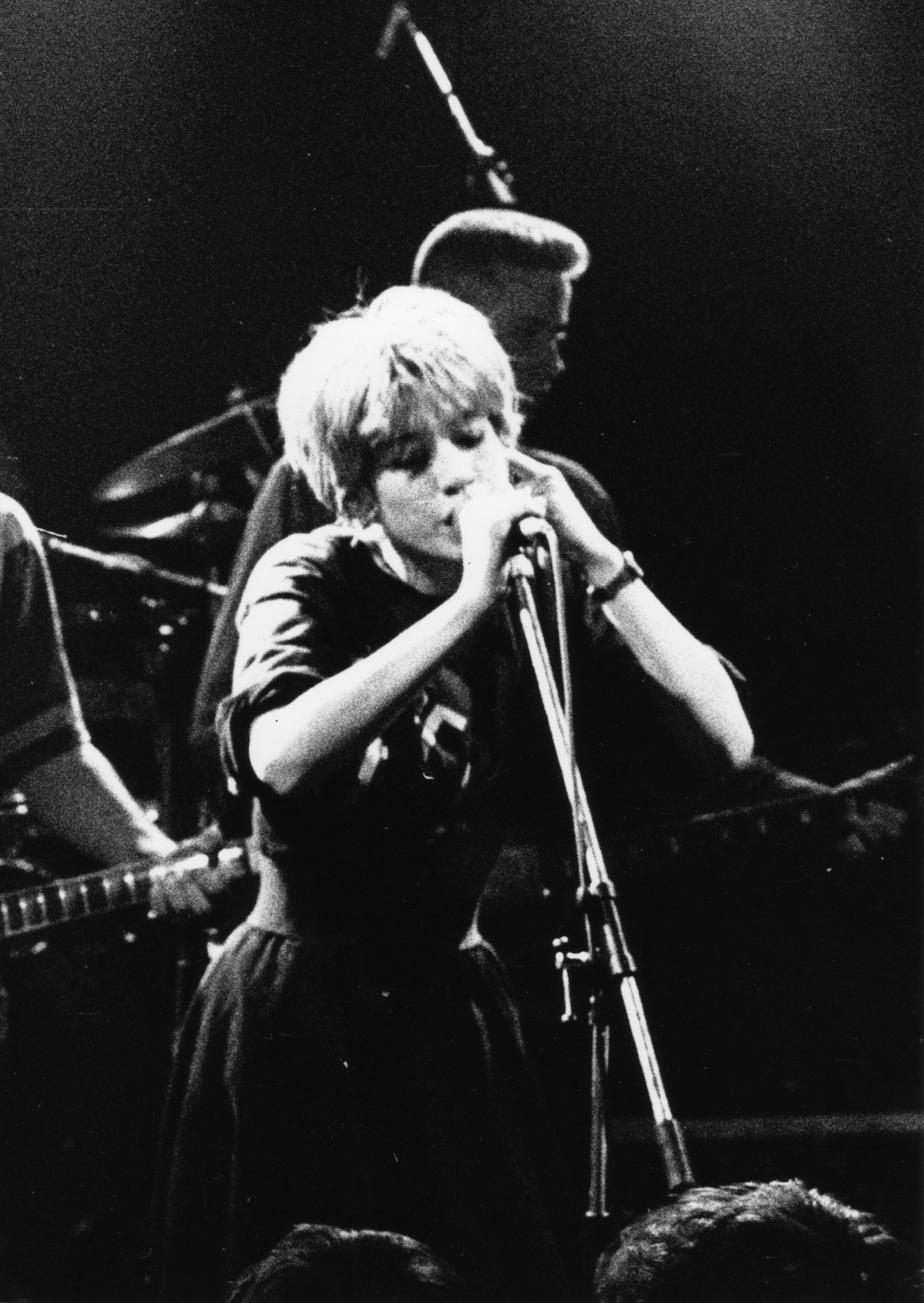
Berenyi circa 1990

=== Early life ===
Berenyi was born in Chelsea, London, in 1967 to a Japanese mother, the actress Yasuko Nagazumi, and a Hungarian father, Ivan Berenyi. She is also a second cousin of the Japanese musician Cornelius. Her parents divorced when she was young and Berenyi began to divide her time between their houses. Berenyi mentions in her autobiography that at her father's house she was subjected to sexual abuse by her paternal grandmother and family friends.

At age 14, Berenyi met friend and future bandmate Emma Anderson while both were students at private school Queen's College. They became interested in music and together published a music fanzine, Alphabet Soup (which lasted for five issues). Berenyi first played bass with the band the Bugs. In 1987, Berenyi studied English literature at North London Polytechnic, where she met drummer Chris Acland and singer Meriel Barham. Along with Anderson, they decided to form their own band, originally called the Baby Machines. Bassist Steve Rippon joined and they changed their name to Lush. When Barham left, "the remaining members of Lush placed ads in local papers looking for Barham's replacement, but they couldn't find the singer they wanted and Berenyi took over the vocals".

=== Lush ===
From 1987 until 1996, she played with Lush, releasing several albums, singles and music videos and toured extensively through the UK, North America, Japan, Australia and other countries. She and Acland also collaborated with members of Cocteau Twins and Moose, releasing one song in 1991 under the name Lillies.

Lush officially announced their breakup in February 1998, following Acland's death by suicide in October 1996.

After Lush split, Berenyi appeared on The Rentals' album Seven More Minutes (1999). She also contributed vocals to a remix of a Flat 7 track by Robin Guthrie (who also produced Lush's early work) and appeared on Seinking Ships' debut album, Museum Quality Capture, released in 2010.

When asked if she missed anything about her time in Lush, Berenyi stated, "I miss the excitement and energy of playing live and the camaraderie of touring—being with the band and crew in a foreign country is like going on holiday with your mates but even more fun because it's free." She also said, "I enjoyed being in the band immensely, I'm glad I did it".

Berenyi later worked for a magazine as a sub-editor and did not perform for many years. She explained: "I was never a proper guitarist—only in the context of Lush. I played the guitar to write songs on and to play live".

Lush, including Berenyi, announced a reunion on 28 September 2015, with former Elastica drummer Justin Welch taking over for Acland. They toured extensively throughout 2016 and released an EP of new material, Blind Spot, in April of that year. Bassist Phil King left the band in October 2016 and as a consequence Lush played their final farewell gig, with Michael Conroy of Modern English on bass at Manchester Academy on 25 November 2016.

Berenyi's memoir Fingers Crossed, which included her account of Lush's story, was published by Nine Eight Books in September 2022.

=== Piroshka ===
In September 2018, Berenyi announced that she had formed a band, Piroshka, a quartet including Berenyi, Justin Welch (Elastica), Michael Conroy (Modern English) and former Moose member K.J. "Moose" McKillop. Their debut album, Brickbat, was released by Bella Union on 15 February 2019. A second album, Love Drips and Gathers, followed on 23 July 2021. Berenyi and her partner, McKillop, have two children.

=== Miki Berenyi Trio ===
Berenyi formed the Miki Berenyi Trio (MB3) with her partner Kevin McKillop, guitarist Oliver Cherer, and a drum machine, initially performing reimagined versions of Lush songs at book signings and instore Q&A sessions, music festivals and literary festivals across the UK.

On 8 May 2024, MB3 released their debut digital single, "Vertigo", on Simon Raymonde's Bella Union label. Before this, the trio's only recorded output was the exclusive stream-only track "Fingers Crossed", featured in the audiobook version of Berenyi's memoir Fingers Crossed: How Music Saved Me from Success.

MB3 promoted "Vertigo" with a short 8-date US tour in June 2024, featuring drummers Lol Tolhurst (the Cure) and Budgie (Siouxsie and the Banshees) as support. The tour included an appearance at the Schellraiser Festival in Nevada, a live session for KEXP-FM in Seattle and headline shows at the Fonda Theatre (Los Angeles), and Webster Hall (New York) where Tolhurst and Budgie joined the band on stage for a version of Lush's "Baby Talk".

On 4 December 2024, MB3 released the Covers EP, a limited edition 10-inch vinyl featuring four Lush cover versions; "Leaves Me Cold", "Covert", "Light from a Dead Star", and "Baby Talk"—all original compositions by Berenyi.

Tripla (2025)

On 14 January 2025, MB3 released a new single, "8th Deadly Sin", and announced the release of their debut album, Tripla. Described as a "richly layered, imaginative and uniquely slanted strain of dream pop", the album blends guitars and electronica, fronted by Berenyi's vocals.

The 9-track album was released in multiple formats on 4 April 2025, via Bella Union, including a limited edition yellow splatter vinyl with a bonus 7-inch featuring two non-album tracks, "Touche" and "Last Orders", and a limited edition 11-track CD, only available through Rough Trade in the UK and US.

Tripla's third single "Big I Am", a blistering, acerbic assault on convention was released on 25 February 2025. The track fuses "jagged, choppy rhythms, a disco beat and a wall of guitar-crunch psychedelics, as Berenyi skewers the hyper-masculine posturing of today's social media warriors".

On 31 March 2025, "Kinch" was released as the fourth and final single ahead of the Tripla album. The song, "inspired by love and loss, reflects on the enduring presence of those we've lost", including Berenyi's late father, Ivan, and Lush drummer Chris Acland (1966–1996), and "explores the nature of love and memory".

A 15-date tour of the United States was also announced, complementing the previously confirmed shows across the United Kingdom and Europe (with Lol Tolhurst).

On 23 April 2025, just three weeks after releasing their debut album Tripla on Bella Union, the Miki Berenyi Trio unexpectedly released a new single, "Stranger". A collaboration with the Cure founding member Lol Tolhurst and his son Gray, the moody, cinematic track was developed following a 2024 tour together and recorded between London, St Leonards and Los Angeles. Lyrically, it explores the emotional complexity of being a friend to a long-term couple going through a breakup. The Trio and Tolhurst are set to tour Europe together late April 2025.

In September 2025, the Miki Berenyi Trio released the digital-only single "Doldrum Days" through Bella Union. Bassist Ollie Cherer described the lyrics as being "about the spaces between places where interesting things can happen", with inspiration drawn from Erskine Childers's novel The Riddle of the Sands. The track was released ahead of the group's October 2025 United States tour, announced as their second and final North American tour due to the high costs of overseas touring.

On 25 March 2026, Miki Berenyi Trio announced the release of standalone single "Island Of One" and accompanying video via Bella Union, along with a supporting tour of the UK, Ireland and an appearance at the Bearded Theory Festival, 24 May.

Spoil The Busy Flames (2027)

On November 17, 2026, Miki Berenyi Trio announced their second studio album, Spoil the Busy Flames, for release on February 19, 2027 via Bella Union. The album follows their debut Tripla (2025) and takes its title from a phrase by Thomas Hardy's poem A Commonplace Day. The announcement was accompanied by the release of lead single "Expect to Believe" and a video by Joe Greenwood. Incorporating influences from electronic dance music and drum and bass, the song addresses misinformation, deepfakes, and the difficulty of distinguishing truth from fabrication in the digital age. The album explores themes of political and personal upheaval, including social media, artificial intelligence, family relationships and mental health.

A twelve-date UK tour was announced for May 2027, including shows in Bristol, Brighton, Ipswich, Nottingham, Manchester, Newcastle, Glasgow, Edinburgh, Leeds, Cambridge, Tunbridge Wells and London. Miki Berenyi Trio will support The House of Love and Ladytron in December 2026.

== Influences ==
In 2020, Berenyi cited the Shangri-Las as an influence for their harmonies and lyrics. She has also cited ABBA and the Smiths as influences.

== Discography ==
=== Lush ===
- Scar (mini-LP) – 9 October 1989
- Mad Love EP – 26 February 1990
- Black Spring EP – 7 October 1991
- Spooky – 27 January 1992
- Hypocrite EP – 30 May 1994
- Desire Lines EP – 30 May 1994
- Split – 13 June 1994
- Lovelife – 5 March 1996
- Blind Spot EP – 15 April 2016

=== Piroshka ===
- Brickbat – 15 February 2019
- Love Drips and Gathers – 23 July 2021

=== Miki Berenyi Trio ===
- Tripla – 4 April 2025
- Spoil The Busy Flames - 19 February 2027

== Books ==
- Berenyi, Miki (2022). Fingers Crossed: how music saved me from success. Nine Eight Books. ISBN 9781788705554. OCLC 1418972247.
