= Robin Guthrie =

Scottish musician and member of Cocteau Twins (born 1962)

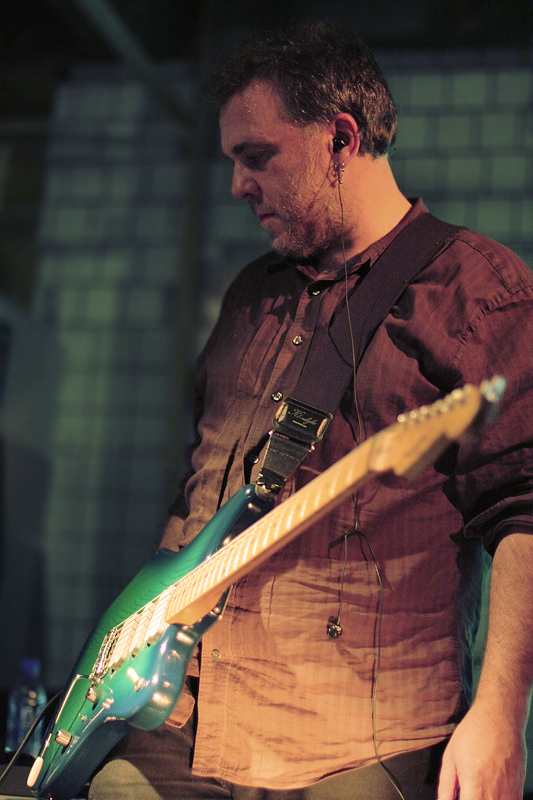
- Guthrie performing in 2008

Background information
- Born: Robin Andrew Guthrie; 4 January 1962 (age 64)
- Origin: Grangemouth, Stirlingshire, Scotland
- Genres: Dream pop; Post-punk; ambient; drone; alternative rock
- Occupations: Musician; songwriter; composer; record producer; audio engineer
- Instruments: Guitar; bass; keyboards; drums
- Years active: 1979–present
- Labels: 4AD; Fontana; Bella Union; Darla; Rocket Girl
- Formerly of: Cocteau Twins
- Website: robinguthrie.com

Robin Andrew Guthrie (born 4 January 1962) is a Scottish musician, songwriter, composer, record producer and audio engineer, best known as the co-founder of the dream pop band Cocteau Twins. During his career Guthrie has performed guitar, bass guitar, keyboards, drums and other musical instruments, in addition to programming, sampling and sound processing.

== Early life ==
Guthrie grew up in Grangemouth, Scotland. There were musical instruments in his family's home, but he never had any proper musical training. With an interest in electronics and trained as an electrician, Guthrie started to experiment with fuzz boxes and guitar pedals to find an alternative sound for his guitar. Guthrie and his friend Will Heggie were members of a four-piece band called The Heat, who later released a single under the name The Liberators in 1980. The same year, Guthrie co-founded Cocteau Twins with Heggie and vocalist Elizabeth Fraser.

== Career ==
Following the break-up of Cocteau Twins in 1998, Guthrie released his first solo record, Imperial, in 2003 on Bella Union Records. Guthrie's next release, which was co-written with Harold Budd, was the film score for Gregg Araki's Mysterious Skin. The soundtrack was released in May 2005 by Commotion and consists of 15 complete songs based on the short pieces used in the film.

In 2006, Guthrie signed a four-album solo deal with Darla Records, the first product of which was the album Continental. In February 2007, American webzine Somewhere Cold voted Continental best album of 2006, on their 2006 Somewhere Cold Awards Hall of Fame, and ranked Guthrie Artist of the Year. He subsequently released two four-track EPs, Everlasting and Waiting for Dawn.

Two more collaborations with Harold Budd (who had previously announced his musical retirement) were released simultaneously in 2007. After the Night Falls and Before the Day Breaks were both co-composed, co-produced and played with Budd. Like the soundtrack to Mysterious Skin, both albums feature slow, drifting pieces primarily created with treated guitar and piano.

Guthrie has also collaborated with singer Siobhan de Maré (formerly of Mono) as the band Violet Indiana. Their first full-length album, Roulette, was released in 2001. A second album, Russian Doll, followed in 2004. In March 2006 Guthrie reported on his weblog that the group had started work again on new material.

In May 2009, Mirrorball, an album-length collaboration between Guthrie and John Foxx was released on Metamatic Records.

A new solo album, Carousel, was released via Rocket Girl in Europe on 1 September 2009 and Darla Records on 15 September 2009. Additionally, Guthrie issued the Angel Falls EP in early 2009, and the Songs to Help My Children Sleep EP in October 2009. A further EP Sunflower Stories was released in March 2010

Guthrie's most recent releases are Emeralds (2011) and two collaboration albums with Harold Budd, Bordeaux and Winter Garden (with Eraldo Bernocchi) (both 2011).

He played guitar on the Telefon Tel Aviv track "The Sky Is Black", from The Birds EP (2012). Guthrie released Fortune, his newest full-length album on 26 November 2012.

In 2015, Guthrie and friend Mark Gardener of Ride wrote, performed and recorded the album Universal Road together.

Guthrie currently tours live under the name "The Robin Guthrie Trio" consisting of himself, Steve Wheeler on bass and Antti Mäkinen on drums.

He has been living in France with his wife Florence since 2001.

== Recording and production work ==
In 1985, Robin Guthrie produced Felt's fourth studio album, Ignite the Seven Cannons, and in 1987, he produced The Gun Club's fourth studio album, Mother Juno in Berlin. In 1990 he produced Lush's second EP Mad Love and a few other songs scattered on various compilation albums. He went on to produce their 1992 debut album Spooky and Black Spring EP (1991).

In 2005, Guthrie mixed Amber Smith's third studio album, RePRINT, which brought the band an international breakthrough.

Guthrie was also responsible for the production, mixing, and instrumentation on Annie Barker's 2007 debut album Mountains and Tumult. In 2011, Barker released her EP titled ...for a better place, which Guthrie produced and provided guitar for.

== Musical style and influences ==
NME likened Guthrie's style to guitarist John McKay's in 1982. David Stubbs considered that up until 1983, Guthrie's "generous shards of guitar seemed to owe something to Siouxsie and the Banshees' ironwashed noise and the aluminium screech of Pil". Guthrie cited the "big guitar noise" of the Birthday Party on "The Friend Catcher" as music that inspired him. He mentioned Phil Spector's works on production as "an obvious influence", naming the Ronettes' "Be My Baby" for "the big sounds". "The noise" made by Mark Stewart of the Pop Group on "She's Beyond Good and Evil" was another influence, along with Roy Orbison's guitar playing on "In Dreams".

== Discography ==
Studio albums (mainly solo)

- Imperial (2003)
- Continental (2006)
- 3:19 - Bande originale du film (2008)
- Carousel (2009)
- Emeralds (2011)
- Fortune (2012)
- Pearldiving (2021)
- Springtime - EP (2022)
- Atlas - EP (2024)
- Astoria - EP (2024)
