= Chris Acland =

English drummer and songwriter (1966–1996)

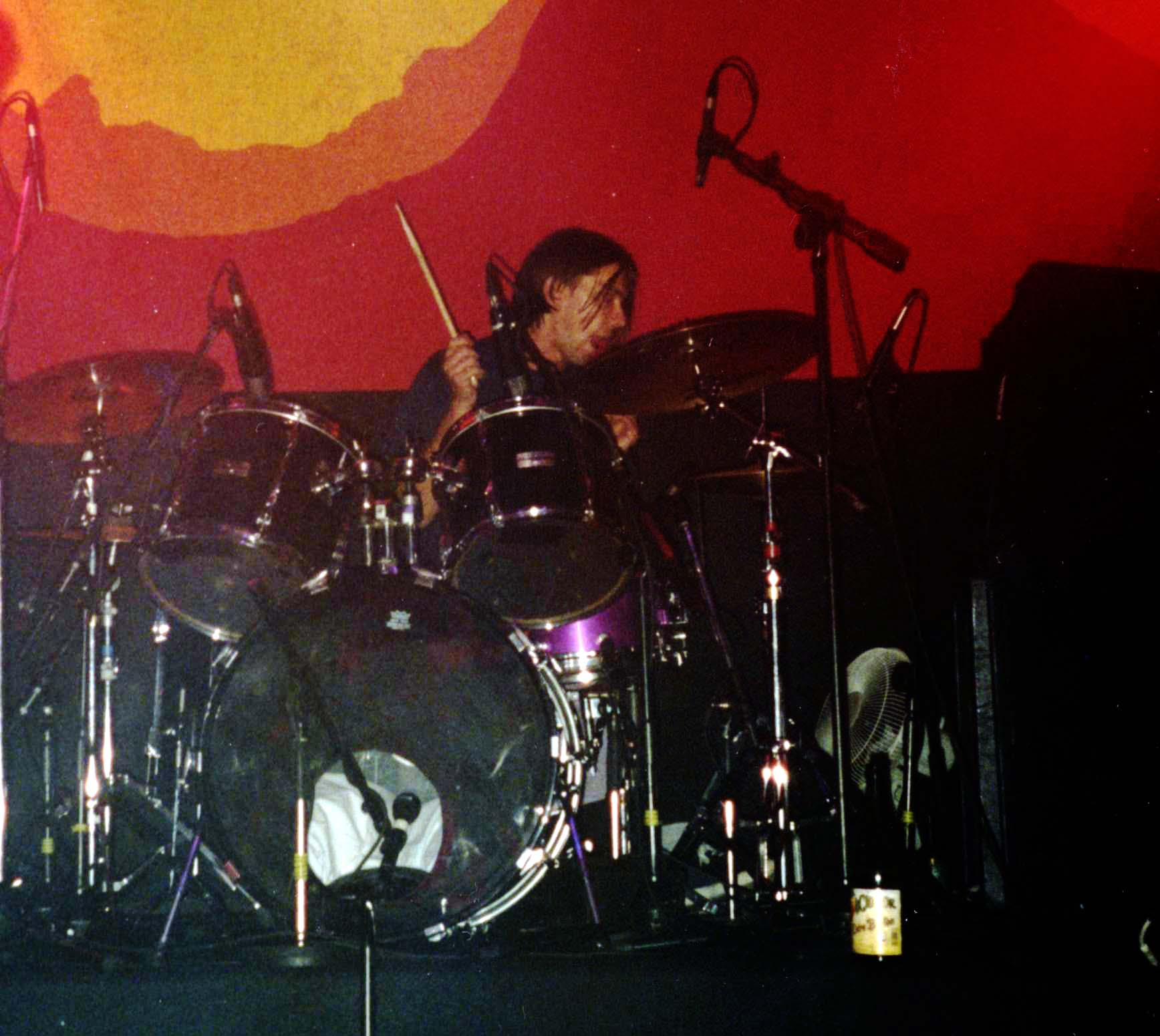
- Acland performing with Lush

Background information
- Born: Christopher John Dyke Acland; 7 September 1966; Lancaster, Lancashire, England
- Died: 17 October 1996 (aged 30) Burneside, England
- Genres: Shoegaze; Britpop
- Occupation: Musician
- Instruments: Drums; guitar
- Years active: 1980–1996
- Label: 4AD
- Formerly of: Lush

Christopher John Dyke Acland (7 September 1966 – 17 October 1996) was an English drummer and songwriter. He was the drummer of the London-based alternative rock band Lush.

== Early life ==
Acland was born at the Royal Lancaster Infirmary in Lancaster, Lancashire, the youngest of three sons of paper manufacturer Oliver Geoffrey Dyke Acland, of Barnsdale, Burneside, Cumbria, who had served as a second lieutenant in the Border Regiment, and Judith Veronica Willans. He was the great-grandson of Sir Francis Dyke Acland, 14th Baronet. He studied at North London Polytechnic, where he met his future Lush bandmates Meriel Barham and Miki Berenyi, briefly dating the latter.

== Career ==
He played in a number of bands, including The Infection, Les Turds, A Touch of Hysteria and Panic, before founding Lush in 1988 with Steve Rippon, Emma Anderson, Meriel Barham and Miki Berenyi. After personnel changes gave way to a stable lineup, Lush released their debut mini-album, Scar, and developed a following as a live act. They would go on to release three albums and several singles and EPs and achieve critical success.

== Personal life and death ==
Acland was a keen football fan and a supporter of Tottenham Hotspur F.C. He and members of Moose and Cocteau Twins formed the group The Lillies and recorded a humorous flexi-disc entitled "And David Seaman Will Be Very Disappointed About That" following the team's victory over North London rivals Arsenal in the 1991 FA Cup semi-finals.

On 17 October 1996, Lush had completed their tour and music festival appearances. Two days after Anderson announced a desire to quit the group, Acland was found dead as a result of suicide by hanging in his parents' garden in Burneside, Cumbria. Devastated by the news, Acland's bandmates disbanded after a period of mourning.
