= Someday My Blues Will Cover the Earth =

Studio album by His Name Is Alive
- Released: August 7, 2001
- Recorded: 1998–2000
- Genre: Rock
- Length: 42:14
- Label: 4AD
- Producer: Steve King, His Name Is Alive

His Name Is Alive chronology
Always Stay Sweet (1999)	Someday My Blues Will Cover the Earth (2001)	Last Night (2002)

Professional ratings
Review scores
Source	Rating
AllMusic	3.5/5 stars
Pitchfork	6.7/10

Someday My Blues Will Cover the Earth is an album by His Name Is Alive, released by 4AD in 2001.

== History ==
Someday My Blues Will Cover the Earth marked a huge change in the sound of His Name Is Alive, and is a controversial record among some of the band's fans. Many long-time fans criticized the album's sound, which bore little relation to the gothic/folk/progressive rock of the band's past. With the band now consisting solely of leader Warren Defever and vocalist Lovetta Pippen, an experienced soul and gospel singer who had first appeared as a part of a gospel choir on 1996's Stars on ESP, Someday... is basically a straightforward soul and R&B album. This was the first HNIA album without long-time vocalist Karin Oliver, whose unique vocal range was, for many fans, the band's key element.

On the other hand, there are some fans who appreciate the album for what it is, noting Defever's characteristic songwriting, production and musicianship, and Pippen's impressive vocal skills. Album reviews were also favorable from publications who were unfamiliar with the band's back catalog.

The replacement of Oliver with Pippen as primary vocalist lead some to believe that Defever had fired Oliver, which tainted the opinions of fans without even hearing the album. The truth was that Oliver had always held jobs in marketing and advertising during her time with HNIA, as the band had never been a commercial success. With the changes at 4AD (outlined in the article on the previous album, Ft. Lake), 4AD had increased commercial expectations for the band. When Ft. Lake was not a big seller, Oliver chose to accept a full-time job offer in marketing, more out of reasons of feasibility than any hostility between her and Defever. Oliver left the band after the US release party for Ft. Lake; a tape of this concert is available from Time Stereo. She was replaced on the resulting tour with Erika Hoffman, who had also been contributing since Stars on ESP.

Defever and Pippen recorded the album from 1998 through 2000. The release of the album was delayed for a year. While 4AD's official reason for the delay was that the elaborate V23 artwork was difficult to produce, there was also speculation that the label was unhappy with the album and had no idea how to market it. The label decided not to renew their option on the band's contract beyond the next album, about six months before Someday... was released. Defever and Pippen were encouraged to go ahead and record the final album of the contract right away. The album, which turned out to be 2002's Last Night, was recorded before Someday... was released, and like its predecessor, was shelved for a year before being released.

The UK version of the album comes in a digipak case with a lyrics booklet in addition to the liner notes, as opposed to the U.S. version which comes in a jewel case and lacks the lyrics booklet. The U.K. version also has slightly different artwork, with the front cover image being in blue which was changed to brown for the U.S. version.

== Track listing ==
1. "Nothing Special" - 4:18
2. "Interlude" - 0:24
3. "Happy Blues" - 4:29
4. "Solitude" - 1:41
5. "Write My Name in the Groove" - 5:51
6. "Your Cheating Heart" - 3:38
7. "Our Last Affair" - 4:28
8. "One Year" - 3:36
9. "Interlude" - 0:48
10. "Karin's Blues" - 3:14
11. "Are We Still Married?" - 3:37
12. "Someday My Blues Will Cover the Earth" - 5:32
13. "Last Time" - 0:38

The version of "Are We Still Married?" marked the third version the band had released. It first appeared on Home Is in Your Head, and a remixed version appeared on The Dirt Eaters EP. Oliver sang those versions, and it is sung by Pippen here. A fourth version would be sung by Andy FM on 2005's Raindrops Rainbow EP.

== Free remix album ==
In 2006, HNIA's website made available a free MP3 download remix album called Someday RMX. The track listing (with remixers listed in parentheses) for this album is:

1. Write My Name (Tony Ollivierra)
2. One Year (Four Tet)
3. Happy Blues (Susumu Yokota)
4. Nothing Special (Herrmann & Kleine)
5. Happy Blues (Recloose)
6. Nothing Special (Burnt Friedman)
7. Someday (Burnt Friedman)
8. One Year (Minotaur Shock)
9. Someday (Ectomorph)
10. Write My Name (HNIA R&B version)
11. Write My Name (HNIA 1998 Demo)
