= Vaughan Oliver =

British graphic designer (1957–2019)

- Oliver, c. 2019
- Born: 12 September 1957; Sedgefield, County Durham, England
- Died: 29 December 2019 (aged 62)
- Education: Newcastle upon Tyne Polytechnic
- Occupation: Graphic designer
- Years active: 1979–2019
- Known for: Album artwork for 4AD records

Vaughan Oliver (12 September 1957 – 29 December 2019) was a British graphic designer based in Epsom, Surrey. Oliver was best known for his work with graphic design studios 23 Envelope and v23. Both studios maintained a close relationship with record label 4AD between 1982 and 1998 and gave distinct visual identities for the 4AD releases by many bands, including Mojave 3, Lush, Cocteau Twins, The Breeders, This Mortal Coil, Pale Saints, Pixies, Modern English, and Throwing Muses. Oliver also designed record sleeves for such artists as David Sylvian, The Golden Palominos, and Bush.

== Early life and education ==
Oliver was born in Sedgefield, County Durham on 12 September 1957. He developed an interest in graphic design through his love of music, in particular the work of Roger Dean. He said in 2014 "There was no real culture, my parents were not really interested in anything unusual – everything I was getting was through record sleeves. It was a democratic way of discovering art." It was not until he studied graphic design at Newcastle upon Tyne Polytechnic that he took the subject seriously. Through his studies his interests broadened to include inspiration from the work of Salvador Dalí, Surrealism and Pop artists such as Robert Rauschenberg and Andy Warhol.

After graduating in 1979, Oliver went to London hoping to find a job with a large design group. He quickly learned that corporate and commercial design work did not suit him. He subsequently met the owner of the record label 4AD, Ivo Watts Russell. This encounter led to a thirty-year partnership between Oliver and 4AD.

== Career ==
23 Envelope consisted of Oliver (graphic design and typography) and Nigel Grierson (photography). Together, they created the artwork for almost all 4AD releases until 1987. Grierson left 23 Envelope in 1988. At that time, Oliver continued to work for 4AD under the studio name v23 with Chris Bigg, collaborating with Simon Larbalestier, Marc Atkins and others.

=== 4AD ===
Oliver's album art was central to the visual identity of 4AD during the label's prominence in the 1980s and 1990s. From 1982 to 1998, Oliver created album artwork for a number of 4AD bands, including Pixies, Cocteau Twins, The Breeders and This Mortal Coil. Although he worked primarily with 4AD, he occasionally took on non-music clients. His work influenced later designers in music graphics. During the early years of 4AD, Pitchfork credited Oliver with giving the label and its bands, despite their differing genres, an identity through his visual language.

=== Pixies ===
Oliver produced the artwork for the Pixies' entire discography during his lifetime, including the albums Come On Pilgrim (1987), Surfer Rosa (1988), Doolittle (1989), Bossanova (1990), Trompe Le Monde (1991), Indie Cindy (2014), Head Carrier (2016) and Beneath the Eyrie (2019), as well as numerous singles and EPs. In 2009, Oliver designed the Pixies' Minotaur, a 26-pound box set consisting of the band's first five albums, a 96-page fine art book and a 52-page photo book. Oliver stated that, with each Pixies release, he had looked to achieve "a sense of continuity" within the catalog but also employ a "fresh approach", and that his ethos "was always about building individual identities for bands."

== Exhibitions and publications ==
In February 1990, Oliver was asked to bring together the work he had done so far for 4AD to be shown for the first time in an art gallery, the Espace Graslin in Nantes, France. The exhibition gathered so much media exposure throughout Europe that it subsequently moved to the Parc de la Villette in Paris. An illustrated catalogue titled Exhibition/Exposition was published to coincide with both Nantes and Paris exhibitions.

In 1994, many of those who had collaborated with Oliver over the previous decade contributed to an illustrated catalogue for the retrospective exhibition of his work held at the Pacific Design Center in Los Angeles, This Rimy River. Recollections of the v23 design experience were provided by individuals such as design writer Rick Poynor, and art critic Ian McKay who frames Oliver's work in a fine art context.

In 2000, a major monograph, Vaughan Oliver: Visceral Pleasures, by Rick Poynor was published by Booth-Clibborn Editions. In 2005, to mark 25 years of 4AD records, Oliver produced a limited-edition publication of his poster designs, with a second edition published in 2007 to coincide with a solo exhibition of his posters staged at Kingston University's Stanley Picker Gallery in London. In 2011, Oliver was awarded an honorary Master of Arts from the University for the Creative Arts, where he taught on the Epsom campus as a visiting professor. Two books of work were published. In 2018, Unit Editions published Vaughan Oliver: Archive ('Materials and fragments'), a celebration of the Vaughan Oliver Archive housed at UCA Epsom.

== Personal life ==
Vaughan Oliver had two children, Beckett and Callum, with his wife, Vicky Oliver (artistically, Victoria Mitchell),, the author of the love poem, 'Dearest Vaya con Dios Darling' (1994), which inspired his LA exhibition's title at the Pacific Design Centre in 1994, and the limited, special edition book 'This Rimy River' in which he used an extract of the poem to overlay each page with one word.They separated in 2003.

At the time of his death, he lived with his wife, Lee, next door to the former home of artist Aubrey Beardsley.

In addition to design, Oliver's other interests included football. Oliver was a qualified FA coach, and he was a keen supporter of Sunderland. He designed the sleeve of their 1992 FA Cup single and had been approached by the club to redesign their crest.

Oliver died on 29 December 2019 at the age of 62.

== Publications ==
- Poynor, Rick (2000). Vaughan Oliver: Visceral Pleasures. London: Booth-Clibborn Editions. ISBN 978-1-86154-072-0.
- Brook, Tony; Shaughnessy, Adrian, eds. (2018). Vaughan Oliver: Archive. Unit Editions. ISBN 978-0-9956664-8-1.

== Album art discography ==
Year	Artist	Album	Ref
1981	Modern English	Mesh & Lace	
1982	Modern English	After the Snow	
1983	Cocteau Twins	Head Over Heels	
1984	This Mortal Coil	It'll End in Tears	
1984	The Sound	Heads and Hearts	
1984	Cocteau Twins	Treasure	
1985	Clan of Xymox	Clan of Xymox	
1985	Colourbox	Colourbox	
1986	This Mortal Coil	Filigree & Shadow	
1986	Cocteau Twins	Victorialand	
1987	Pixies	Come on Pilgrim	
1987	David Sylvian	Secrets of the Beehive	
1987	Pieter Nooten and Michael Brook	Sleeps with the Fishes	
1988	Pixies	Surfer Rosa	
1988	Throwing Muses	House Tornado	
1988	Ultra Vivid Scene	Ultra Vivid Scene	
1989	Pixies	Doolittle	
1989	Xymox	Twist of Shadows	
1989	Lush	Scar	
1990	Pale Saints	The Comforts of Madness	
1990	The Breeders	Pod	
1990	Lush	Mad Love	
1990	Lush	Sweetness and Light	
1990	Ultra Vivid Scene	Joy 1967–1990	
1990	His Name Is Alive	Livonia	
1990	Pixies	Bossanova	
1991	The Psychedelic Furs	World Outside	
1991	This Mortal Coil	Blood	
1991	Pixies	Trompe le Monde	
1991	Lush	Black Spring	
1992	Lush	Spooky	
1992	Ultra Vivid Scene	Rev	
1992	The Breeders	Safari	
1992	Pale Saints	In Ribbons	
1992	Red House Painters	Down Colorful Hill	
1993	The Breeders	Last Splash	
1993	Kirsty MacColl	Titanic Days	
1993	David Sylvian and Robert Fripp	The First Day	
1993	His Name Is Alive	Mouth by Mouth	
1993	Lush	Split	
1993	Lisa Germano	Happiness	
1993	Frank Black	Frank Black	
1994	Kristin Hersh	Hips and Makers	
1994	Kristin Hersh	Strings	
1995	Throwing Muses	University	
1995	Mojave 3	Ask Me Tomorrow	
1996	Bush	Razorblade Suitcase	
1996	His Name Is Alive	Stars on E.S.P.	
1998	Kristin Hersh	Strange Angels	
1998	His Name Is Alive	Ft. Lake	
2001	His Name Is Alive	Someday My Blues Will Cover the Earth	
2002	The Breeders	Title TK	
2002	The Mountain Goats	Tallahassee	
2003	Throwing Muses	Throwing Muses	
2003	Kristin Hersh	The Grotto	
2005	The Mountain Goats	The Sunset Tree	
2006	Scott Walker	The Drift	
2006	The Mountain Goats	Get Lonely	
2006	TV on the Radio	Return to Cookie Mountain	
2006	Jóhann Jóhannsson	IBM 1401, A User's Manual	
2007	Emma Pollock	Watch the Fireworks	
2007	M. Ward	To Go Home	
2007	Scott Walker	And Who Shall Go to the Ball? And What Shall Go to the Ball?	
2008	The Breeders	Mountain Battles	
2008	Jóhann Jóhannsson	Fordlandia	
2008	The Mountain Goats	Heretic Pride	
2009	The Mountain Goats	The Life of the World to Come	
2009	The Breeders	Fate to Fatal	
2010	Modern English	Soundtrack	
2011	David Lynch	Crazy Clown Time	
2011	I Break Horses	Hearts	
2011	Asobi Seksu	Fluorescence	
2014	Pixies	Indie Cindy	
2016	Pixies	Head Carrier	
2019	Pixies	Beneath the Eyrie	
