= Nice Day =

Nice Day EP

EP by His Name Is Alive
- Released: October 27, 1997
- Recorded: 1996
- Genre: Experimental rock
- Length: 14:22
- Label: 4AD (JAD 7009)
- Producer: His Name Is Alive

His Name Is Alive chronology
Stars on ESP (1996)	Nice Day EP (1997)	Ft. Lake (1998)

Professional ratings
Review scores
Source	Rating
Allmusic	link
Robert Christgau	link

Nice Day is an EP by His Name Is Alive, released by 4AD in the UK in 1997.

== History ==
After the completion of the tour for Stars on ESP, His Name Is Alive leader Warren Defever found himself with a steady lineup for perhaps the first time in the band's history; veteran vocalist Karin Oliver and drummer Trey Many, along with newer members: vocalist Lovetta Pippen and bassist Chad Gilchrist, frequent guest vocalist Dara Albro on title track with Defever himself on guitar, and newer vocalist Erika Hoffman (who sings on four of the six tracks). As a result, Defever was anxious to make a new recording and quickly recorded the tracks for this EP in late 1996. It would be almost a year later, in October 1997, before it was released. Apparently this irked Defever somewhat, as the booklet for the 1999 compilation Always Stay Sweet features a copy of a fax that Defever sent to 4AD urging them to hurry up and release the EP.

While originally intended as a mail-order only release of 1,000 copies, the CD EP was soon re-pressed and sold in stores. The tracks were also appended to a reissue of Stars on ESP in 1998.

"Soul Resides in the Horse Barn" is a re-recording of an early His Name Is Alive song, which originally appeared on the King of Sweet compilation.

== Concepts ==
Nice Day furthers the motifs of Stars on ESP—classic AM radio pop and Michigan in the late 1960s and early 1970s, but takes a more rock-oriented approach. The sound could be described as a mix between Motown and the grittier side of that era in Detroit: the protopunk sounds of The Stooges and the MC5. The Motown influence comes via the increased presence of Pippen, an experienced soul and gospel singer.

== Track listing ==
1. "Nice Day"
2. "Drive Around the Clock"
3. "Crashed Up on the Corner"
4. "Soul Resides in the Horse Barn"
5. "Whale, You Ease My Mind"
6. "Oh Sinner Man"
