= Nomo (band) =

- Origin: Ann Arbor, Michigan, United States
- Genres: Afro-beat, jazz fusion
- Labels: Ubiquity Records

Nomo is an American band from Ann Arbor, Michigan, United States. The band formed at the University of Michigan, and is not to be confused with the 1980s Pop/New Wave band of the same name fronted by California singer-songwriter David Batteau, which is best known for the 1985 minor hit "Red Lipstick".

Fronted by Elliot Bergman, the band has recorded for Ubiquity Records and Ypsilanti Records. The band has been recorded by His Name Is Alive frontman Warn Defever. Members of Nomo also perform on various His Name Is Alive albums, including Detrola, XMMER, and Sweet Earth Flower. Members include nine core members; Elliot Bergman (saxophone, percussion, electric mbira, and electric sawblade gamelan), Erik Hall (guitar, Nu-Tone Cymbals, and drums), Quin Kirchner (congas, drums, percussion), Dan Bennett (baritone saxophone, percussion), Justin Walter (trumpet, wah-wah), Jake Vinsel (bass). In an interview, Bergman said: "NOMO is a big melting pot of ideas and influences."

== Discography ==
=== Albums ===
- Nomo (Ypsilanti Records, 2004)
- Better Than That [EP] (Kindred Spirits, 2006)
- Nu Tones (Ubiquity Records, 2006)
- New Tones (Ubiquity Records, 2006)
- Ghost Rock (Ubiquity Records, 2008)
- Invisible Cities (Ubiquity Records, 2009)
