= Always Stay Sweet =

Compilation album by His Name Is Alive
- Released: February 23, 1999
- Recorded: 1985–1995
- Genre: Dream pop, ethereal wave, experimental rock
- Length: 64:00; 72:49 (Mexican version)
- Label: 4AD (CAD 9002)
- Producer: His Name Is Alive

His Name Is Alive chronology
| Ft. Lake (1998) | Always Stay Sweet (1999) | Someday My Blues Will Cover the Earth (2001) |

Professional ratings
Review scores
| Source | Rating |
|---|---|
| Allmusic | 4.5/5 stars |
| Robert Christgau | (dud) |

Always Stay Sweet is a compilation album by His Name Is Alive, released by 4AD on February 23, 1999.

== History ==
Always Stay Sweet is one of the rare 4AD albums that was released in the USA only, and not the label's native UK. It is a compilation of tracks from His Name Is Alive's first five records for the label, all of which—except for Stars on ESP—were out of print in America at the time. This is presumably part of the reason why 4AD chose the album for American release only—it was a way for American audiences to acquire some of the band's early work in lieu of re-issuing the entire back catalog.

The album relies heavily on the early albums when HNIA were often described as a gothic folk band inspired by 4AD supergroup This Mortal Coil. Nearly all of the songs are from 1990's Livonia, 1991's Home Is in Your Head, and 1993's Mouth by Mouth. Only two songs from Stars on ESP are included, and nearly all of the songs from The Dirt Eaters EP are featured (although two of the tracks from this EP are alternate versions that appeared on the LPs). No tracks from 1998's Ft. Lake are included at all, although the front cover was based on the inside sleeve of that album. The song “Underwater” was previously unreleased, having been recorded during the sessions for Mouth by Mouth. “The Dirt Eaters” is the version that appeared on the USA release of Mouth by Mouth, without the Jack Nicholson sample.

A version of the CD released by Mexican label Opción Sónica included two more songs from Stars on ESP and a rare track from the 1994 4AD compilation All Virgos Are Mad.

As this CD came out after 4AD's USA distribution deal with Warner Bros. Records had ended, 4AD was back in the position of having to find distribution for each USA release. While the label has mostly used the Alternative Distribution Alliance, which distributes many indie rock labels in America, Always Stay Sweet was actually distributed by major label Polygram Records.

== Track listings ==
All tracks are written by His Name Is Alive, except where noted.

4AD CD release (CAD 9002 CD)
| No. | Title | Writer(s) | Alternate track title | Length |
|---|---|---|---|---|
| 1. | "Are You Coming Down This Weekend?" | | This Week | 0:18 |
| 2. | "Her Eyes Were Huge Things" | | Eyes Were | 1:40 |
| 3. | "E-Nicolle" | | Nikki | 3:20 |
| 4. | "If July" | | Julie | 3:31 |
| 5. | "How Ghosts Affect Relationships" | | Ghosts | 3:56 |
| 6. | "Chances Are We Are Mad" | | Chances R | 3:02 |
| 7. | "As We Could Ever" | | We Could | 2:45 |
| 8. | "Are We Still Married?" | | Married | 2:55 |
| 9. | "Why People Disappear" | | People | 4:17 |
| 10. | "Blue Moon" | Alex Chilton | Blue | 2:16 |
| 11. | "Cornfield" | | | 3:15 |
| 12. | "Home Is in Your Head" | | Home | 2:26 |
| 13. | "Underwater" | | | 3:29 |
| 14. | "We Hold the Land in Great Esteem" | | In Great Esteem | 4:00 |
| 15. | "Last One" | | | 2:31 |
| 16. | "Sitting Still Moving Still Staring Outlooking" | | Still | 3:26 |
| 17. | "The Sand That Holds the Lakes in Place" | His Name Is Alive, Matthew Smith | Lake | 2:43 |
| 18. | "In Every Ford" | Melissa Elliott | Ford | 3:44 |
| 19. | "Baby Fish Mouth" | | Mouth | 2:31 |
| 20. | "The Dirt Eaters" | Melissa Elliott | Dirt | 4:19 |
| 21. | "Man on the Silver Mountain" | Ritchie Blackmore, Ronnie James Dio | Man | 3:37 |

Opción Sónica CD release
| No. | Title | Writer(s) | Alternate track title | Length |
|---|---|---|---|---|
| 1. | "Are You Coming Down This Weekend?" | | This Week | 0:18 |
| 2. | "Her Eyes Were Huge Things" | | Eyes Were | 1:40 |
| 3. | "E-Nicolle" | | Nikki | 3:20 |
| 4. | "If July" | | Julie | 3:31 |
| 5. | "How Ghosts Affect Relationships" | | Ghosts | 3:56 |
| 6. | "Chances Are We Are Mad" | | Chances R | 3:02 |
| 7. | "As We Could Ever" | | We Could | 2:45 |
| 8. | "Are We Still Married?" | | Married | 2:55 |
| 9. | "Why People Disappear" | | People | 4:17 |
| 10. | "Blue Moon" | Alex Chilton | Blue | 2:16 |
| 11. | "Cornfield" | | | 3:15 |
| 12. | "Home Is in Your Head" | | Home | 2:26 |
| 13. | "Underwater" | | | 3:29 |
| 14. | "We Hold the Land in Great Esteem" | | In Great Esteem | 4:00 |
| 15. | "Last One" | | | 2:31 |
| 16. | "Sitting Still Moving Still Staring Outlooking" | | Still | 3:26 |
| 17. | "The Sand That Holds the Lakes in Place" | His Name Is Alive, Matthew Smith | Lake | 2:43 |
| 18. | "In Every Ford" | Melissa Elliott | Ford | 3:44 |
| 19. | "Baby Fish Mouth" | | Mouth | 2:31 |
| 20. | "Bad Luck Girl" | | Country Girl | 2:02 |
| 21. | "Library Girl" | | | 3:24 |
| 22. | "The Dirt Eaters" | Melissa Elliott | Dirt | 4:19 |
| 23. | "Man on the Silver Mountain" | Ritchie Blackmore, Ronnie James Dio | Man | 3:37 |
| 24. | "Universal Frequencies" | His Name Is Alive, Matthew Smith | Beech Boys | 3:22 |

== Notes ==
4AD release

- Tracks 3, 4, 5, and 7 taken from Livonia (CAD 0008, June 1990)
- Tracks 1, 2, 6, 8, 9, 12, and 16 taken from Home Is in Your Head (CAD 1013, September 1991)
- Tracks 14 and 21 taken from The Dirt Eaters EP (BAD 2005, April 1992)
- Tracks 10, 11, 18, 19, and 20 taken from Mouth by Mouth (CAD 3006, April 1993)
- Tracks 15 and 17 taken from Stars on ESP (CAD 6010, June 1996)
- Track 13 is previously unreleased

Opción Sónica release

- “Bad Luck Girl” and “Universal Frequencies” taken from Stars on ESP
- “Library Girl” taken from the 4AD compilation All Virgos Are Mad (AVAM, September 1994)
