= Sweet Earth Flower =

Sweet Earth Flower: A Tribute to Marion Brown

Compilation album by His Name Is Alive
- Released: November 6, 2007
- Recorded: Brown Rice Studios and University of Michigan Museum of Art; 20 November 2004 – 14 October 2006
- Genre: Rock, experimental rock, jazz, avant-garde jazz, free jazz
- Length: 60:33
- Label: High Two
- Producer: Warn Defever

His Name is Alive chronology
XMMER (2007)	Sweet Earth Flower: A Tribute to Marion Brown (2007)	Firefly Dragonfly (2007)

Professional ratings
Review scores
Source	Rating
Allmusic	4/5 stars

Sweet Earth Flower is a tribute album by His Name Is Alive recorded to honor the music of Marion Brown. Although it appeared after the Xmmer album, it was recorded between the release of Detrola and Xmmer. It was released by the High Two label in 2007.

== Track listing ==
=== Side A ===
1. Sweet Earth Flying - 6:58
2. Juba Lee - 8:02
3. Capricorn Moon (live) - 13:32
4. November Cotton Flower - 4:34

=== Side B ===
1. Bismillahi 'Rrahmani 'Rrahim - 4:47
2. Geechee Recollections (I) - 9:07
3. Geechee Recollections (II) - 6:11
4. Sweet Earth Flying (live) - 7:22

=== Compositions ===
All pieces were composed by Marion Brown, except "Bismillahi 'Rrahmani 'Rrahim," which was written by longtime Brown collaborator Harold Budd. The track appears on Budd's Pavilion of Dreams album, as well as the Brown album Vista.

== Recording sessions ==
The album was recorded partly as a live concert and partly in studio sessions. The album's three live tracks were recorded November 2004 at University of Michigan Museum of Art.

== Other musicians ==
While His Name is Alive has been a rotating cast of musicians since its inception, Sweet Earth Flower features a new crop of contributors. Elliot Bergman, leader of the Michigan band Nomo, was a key contributor to Detrola. He appears on much of Sweet Earth Flower, with much of Nomo in tow. Dan Piccolo, Michael Herbst, Justin Walter, Erik Hall, and Olman Piedra.

== Personnel ==
- Warn Defever - guitar, piano
- Elliot Bergman - tenor saxophone, Rhodes
- Jamie Saltsman - double bass
- Justin Walter - trumpet
- Jamie Easter - percussion
- Dan Piccolo - drums, percussion
- Michael Herbst - alto saxophone
- Erik Hall - electric piano
- Olman Piedra - congas, cajon

== Sleeve ==
The album's sleeve was designed by Warn Defever and Dion Fischer. It features two stencil images of Brown. The cover features a reverse image of Brown.

== Release history ==
Country	Date	Label	Format	Catalog
United States	November 6, 2007	High Two	CD	HT014

== See also ==
- Marion Brown
- His Name is Alive
- Nomo (band)
- Warn Defever
