= King of Sweet =

Compilation album by His Name Is Alive
- Released: 1993
- Recorded: 1989–1992
- Genre: Rock
- Length: 72:00
- Label: Perdition Plastics
- Producer: His Name Is Alive

His Name Is Alive chronology
Mouth by Mouth (1993)	King of Sweet (1993)	Stars on ESP (1996)

Professional ratings
Review scores
Source	Rating
Allmusic	4/5 stars

King of Sweet is a compilation album by His Name Is Alive, originally released in a limited run by the Perdition Plastics label in 1993. Most, if not all, of the songs had previously appeared on the band's many self-released cassettes in the late 1980s and early 1990s, and some of them had appeared in different versions on the band's 4AD releases.

== History ==
By 1993, His Name Is Alive's albums were generally being released by 4AD in both the USA and the UK. However, leader Warren Defever did not have an exclusive contract with 4AD. Defever stated in interviews that the arrangement with 4AD was quite loose; 4AD president Ivo Watts-Russell would release what he was interested in, and Defever was free to release the rest elsewhere. While this mostly resulted in homemade cassettes released through Defever's Time Stereo imprint, a CD called King of Sweet appeared in the fall of 1993. The CD was made up mostly of songs that had appeared on the self-released cassettes, including several songs that eventually appeared on Home Is in Your Head. In particular, there are four songs that are based on Home Is In Your Head's "Are You Coming Down This Weekend?", albeit in much longer versions than the 18-second version that had originally appeared.

The song "Honey Babe, My Blue-Eyed Babe," was recorded in a different version for Mouth by Mouth under the name "Underwater". "Underwater", however, didn't make the final cut of the album, and remained unreleased until the 1999 compilation Always Stay Sweet.

The original CD release was a limited edition of 2000 numbered copies, making this a highly sought-after and expensive release. It is now available in a remastered form as a downloadable purchase from the Silver Mountain Media website.

== Track listing ==
1. "Take a Look around You"
2. "A Bird in Every Tree"
3. "This Weekend"
4. "Drive the Dreamy Demon Down"
5. "Lake (Theme for Sweet Hearts)"
6. "Blissfield (Sweet Corn)"
7. "Bears (King of Sweet)"
8. "Ode on a Dave Asman"
9. "A Dave in the Life"
10. "Honey Babe, My Blue-Eyed Babe"
11. "The Shepherd's Flute Is Always Playing"
12. "Are You Coming Down This Weekend?"
13. "Soul Resides in the Horse Barn"
14. "Driftin Blues"
15. "Meet Me by the Moonlight, Alone"
