= Ablaze =

Ablaze may refer to:

- Ablaze (2001 film), a 2001 American disaster film
- Ablaze (2019 film), a 2019 New Zealand television film about a department store fire
- Ablaze (2021 film), a 2021 Australian documentary film about Bill Onus
- Ablaze!, a British magazine
- "Ablaze", a song by Alanis Morissette from the album Such Pretty Forks in the Road
