= In Ribbons =

Studio album by Pale Saints
- Released: 23 March 1992
- Recorded: October 1991 – January 1992
- Studio: Monnow Valley (Monmouth); Palladium (Edinburgh); Blackwing (London)
- Genre: Shoegaze
- Length: 51:24
- Label: 4AD
- Producer: Hugh Jones

Pale Saints chronology
The Comforts of Madness (1990)	In Ribbons (1992)	Slow Buildings (1994)

Singles from In Ribbons
- 1. "Throwing Back the Apple" Released: 11 May 1992

In Ribbons is the second studio album by English alternative rock band Pale Saints, released on 23 March 1992 by 4AD. It peaked at number 61 on the UK Albums Chart.

== Critical reception ==
Professional ratings
Review scores
Source	Rating
AllMusic	4.5/5 stars
The Encyclopedia of Popular Music	4/5 stars
MusicHound Rock: The Essential Album Guide	4/5 stars
NME	9/10

Jack Rabid of Trouser Press called In Ribbons "alluring and attractive, rich in complexity and raw emotion." Martin C. Strong wrote that "the subtlety of its shredding chords and sporadic sonic dreamscapes were let loose all over the shop." MusicHound Rock: The Essential Album Guide wrote that the album "immaculately balances wide-screen guitars and soft melodies."

Spin included In Ribbons in a 2007 list of "essential" shoegaze albums. In 2016, Pitchfork ranked In Ribbons at number 34 on its list of the 50 best shoegaze albums of all time.

== Track listing ==
All tracks are written by Pale Saints (Meriel Barham, Chris Cooper, Ian Masters, and Graeme Naysmith), except where noted

UK edition
No.	Title	Length
1.	"Throwing Back the Apple"	4:09
2.	"Ordeal"	3:58
3.	"Thread of Light"	4:05
4.	"Shell"	4:54
5.	"There Is No Day"	0:39
6.	"Hunted"	7:42
7.	"Hair Shoes"	5:48
8.	"Babymaker"	3:25
9.	"Liquid"	2:43
10.	"Neverending Night"	4:45
11.	"Featherframe"	4:38
12.	"A Thousand Stars Burst Open"	4:38
Total length:		51:24

Japanese and US edition
No.	Title	Writer(s)	Length
1.	"Throwing Back the Apple"		4:09
2.	"Ordeal"		3:58
3.	"Thread of Light"		4:05
4.	"Shell"		4:54
5.	"There Is No Day"		0:39
6.	"Hunted"		6:28
7.	"Blue Flower"	Peter Blegvad; Anthony Moore	5:37
8.	"Hair Shoes"		5:48
9.	"Babymaker"		3:25
10.	"Liquid"		2:43
11.	"Neverending Night"		4:45
12.	"Featherframe"		4:38
13.	"A Thousand Stars Burst Open"		4:38
Total length:			55:47

== Personnel ==
Credits are adapted from the album's liner notes.

- Pale Saints (Meriel Barham, Chris Cooper, Ian Masters, and Graeme Naysmith) – all instruments (except cello), arrangement

Additional musicians

- Hugh Jones – arrangement
- Caroline Lavelle – cello

Production

- Phil Ault – engineering
- Goetz Botzenhardt – engineering
- Alan Branch – engineering
- Steve Bray – engineering
- Kevin Hurley – engineering
- Hugh Jones – production, engineering
- John O'Donnell – engineering
- Paul Tipler – engineering

Design

- Chris Bigg – sleeve design
- Matt Heslop – portrait photography
- Vaughan Oliver – sleeve design
- Pirate – model making
- Kevin Westenberg – still life photography

== Charts ==
Chart (1992)	Peak position
UK Albums (OCC)	61
UK Independent Albums (OCC)	10
