= Mad Love (EP) =

EP by Lush
- Released: 26 February 1990
- Recorded: December 1989
- Studios: September Sound and; the Church in London, England
- Genres: Dream pop; shoegaze; post-punk; alternative rock
- Length: 11:48
- Label: 4AD
- Producer: Robin Guthrie

Lush chronology
Scar (1989)	Mad Love (1990)	Sweetness and Light (1990)

Mad Love is the debut extended play by the English alternative rock band Lush. It was released on 26 February 1990 by 4AD. Produced by Cocteau Twins guitarist Robin Guthrie, Mad Love was composed of four tracks—including a rerecording of "Thoughtforms", a song from Lush's debut mini-album Scar (1989).

In contrast to Scar, Mad Love features more polished production techniques and expansive music styles, including elements of jangle pop, post-punk and shoegaze. It was well received in the United Kingdom and the United States, with Mad Love being the band's first release to place in the mainstream UK Singles Chart and its opening track "De-Luxe" in the US Billboard Modern Rock Tracks chart. A minor success, it topped the UK Independent Singles Chart upon release.

== Background and recording ==
Lush released their debut mini-album Scar in October 1989 to warm reviews. Scar was originally to be produced by Guthrie, but several scheduling difficulties occurred—including the sessions for the Cocteau Twins' album Heaven or Las Vegas and the birth of Guthrie's daughter—which led to the band choosing a different producer. In December 1989, Lush recorded Mad Love during sessions at Guthrie's own studio, September Sound, in southwest London and further sessions at the Church, a mid-range studio in north London.

Vocalist-guitarist Miki Berenyi considered Guthrie's production on Mad Love "quite different" to John Fryer's techniques on Scar, describing Guthrie's as "more commercial; it's not nearly as raw or rough". She said that the sound of Mad Love was more akin to how the band sounded live, with more emphasis on guitars but "not nearly as delicate", as the band had a reputation in the British music press for poor performances in their early career.

== Lyrics and music ==
Mad Love features Lush's "trademark 4AD ethereal" sound, which was described by Melody Maker as "succulent, individual melodies" and "romantic student ditties" which were sung in "gossamer voices". In addition, the EP features heavily treated layers of texturised guitars, processed with various effects units. The overall sound of Mad Love drew comparisons to the jangle pop stylings of R.E.M. and indie pop band Marine Girls, but several critics noted that Lush's post-punk roots were still present on the EP, partially due to several songs' shifting time signatures.

Several elements of dream pop are also discernible on Mad Love, such as vocal tracks deliberately placed low in the mix and indecipherable lyrics, which Berenyi said "exist in a vacuum" to avoid misinterpretation. "De-Luxe", in particular, has been noted for its "complex, folky harmonies".

== Title and packaging ==
Mad Love's title is a rough translation of L'amour fou, the title of a 1937 photographic novel by French surrealist writer André Breton. Guitarist Emma Anderson suggested the idea for the title to Berenyi after the latter received a telephone call from 4AD co-founder Ivo Watts-Russell requesting a title for the record in less than an hour. Bassist Steve Rippon considered it a "heavy metal title … like Led Zeppelin", while Berenyi said it was reminiscent of the 1987 film Crazy Love.

Mad Love's packaging was designed by Vaughan Oliver, with assistance from Chris Bigg, and features photography by Jim Friedman. All three had been involved in creation of the album sleeve for Lush's previous release, Scar.

The run-out matrix codes on the groove of the 12-inch record pressing of Mad Love displayed two obscure messages: "Hey Hey Havanna" on side 1 and "What are you like?" on side 2. Similar messages were hidden on the LP pressing of Scar.

== Release and reception ==
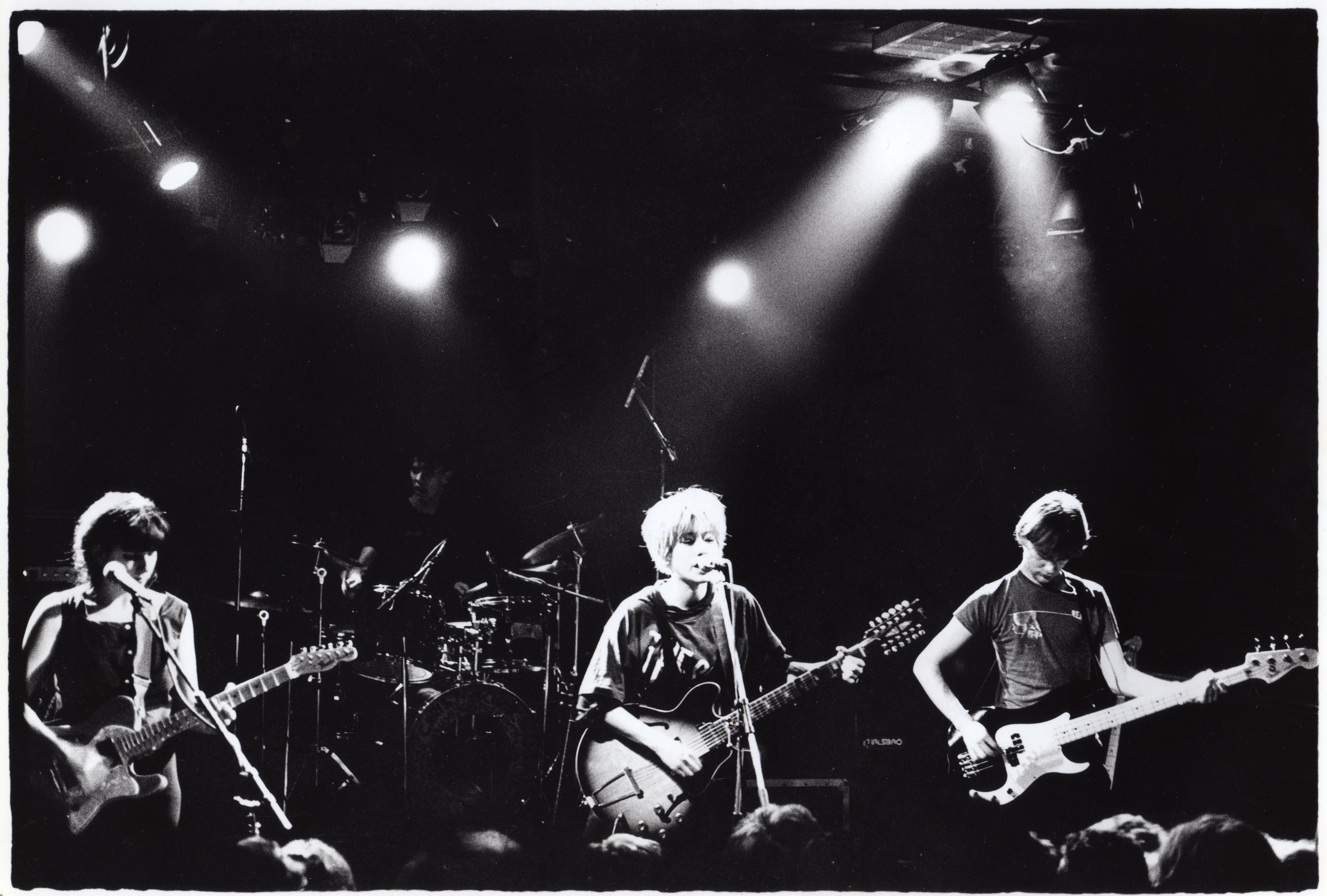
Lush (from left to right: Emma Anderson, Chris Acland, Miki Berenyi and Steve Rippon) performing in Rennes, France in April 1990 during the band's first-ever European dates

Mad Love was released on 26 February 1990 by 4AD in the United Kingdom. It was issued as a 12", CD and cassette; it was later made available as a digital download. Upon its release, Mad Love entered the mainstream UK Singles Chart, peaking at No. 55 in its first week, and reached the No. 1 position on the Independent Singles Chart.

In the United States, "De-Luxe" was released as a promotional-only radio single on Reprise Records, and the song peaked at No. 14 on the Billboard Modern Rock Tracks chart. Two separate music videos were created for the song: "the 4AD version" in March 1990, and a version directed by Howard Greenhalgh in February 1991.

A national tour in support of Mad Love began in March 1990, which was documented as part of Lush's debut British television appearance on Snub TV, and Lush performed their first-ever shows in Europe during a spring tour with Pale Saints. The band also recorded a radio session for John Peel, which was broadcast on BBC Radio around the time of Mad Love's release.

Reviews of Mad Love ranged from mixed to positive. In Alternative Press Rachel Felder wrote how she "somehow expected more … than its fine (as in fine but no cigar) tracks deliver", but surmised that the EP was "a marvelous combination of simple pop and critically correct noises". NME referred to Mad Love as "at the mid-point of between the sombre gravity of rock and giddy levity of pop", while Melody Maker's Steve Sutherland referred to it as a "beautiful, primitive record" in the same vein as the Cocteau Twins' Head over Heels (1983).

A remastered version of "De-Luxe" was included on Ciao! Best of Lush, a compilation album released in March 2001. The song was also featured as a playable track in two titles of the Rock Band video game series: Rock Band 2 and Unplugged.

== Track listing ==
All tracks are written by Emma Anderson unless otherwise noted.

Mad Love (EP) track listing
No.	Title	Writer(s)	Length
1.	"De-Luxe"		3:27
2.	"Leaves Me Cold"	Miki Berenyi	2:56
3.	"Downer"		2:40
4.	"Thoughtforms"		2:45

== Personnel ==
All personnel credits adapted from Mad Love's notes.

Lush

- Miki Berenyi – lead vocals, guitar
- Emma Anderson – guitar, backing vocals
- Steve Rippon – bass
- Chris Acland – drums

Technical personnel

- Robin Guthrie – production, engineering
- Lincoln Fong – engineering

Design personnel

- Vaughan Oliver – art direction, design
- Chris Bigg – design assistance
- Jim Friedman – photography

== Charts ==
Chart (1990)	Peak position
UK Singles Chart	55
UK Independent Singles Chart	1
