= Last Night (His Name Is Alive album) =

Studio album by His Name Is Alive
- Released: 2002
- Genre: Experimental rock
- Label: 4AD
- Producer: His Name Is Alive

His Name Is Alive chronology
Someday My Blues Will Cover the Earth (2001)	Last Night (2002)	Detrola (2006)

Last Night is an album by the American experimental rock band His Name Is Alive, released in 2002. Lovetta Pippen sings on the album.

== Production ==
The album was mostly recorded live, with frontman Warren Defever using the musicians he toured with in support of Someday My Blues Will Cover the Earth. It contains a cover of Jimi Hendrix's "Storm".

== Critical reception ==
Professional ratings
Review scores
Source	Rating
AllMusic	4.5/5 stars
Edmonton Journal	2.5/5 stars
Pitchfork Media	7.8/10

Salon wrote that "the 13 songs fuse old funk with a touch of Jimi Hendrix ... and a dash of trip-hop, like Morcheeba playing your house party." The Guardian concluded that "His Name Is Alive have brought the funk while remaining mindful of their art, and Last Night is gorgeous."

The Herald Sun thought that "Someday My Prince Will Come" "stretches out to a hypnotic 11-minute jam spiced up with tenor and baritone sax, giving it the earthy feel of [the band] Morphine." The Edmonton Journal stated that "Defever's pseudo jazz/lounge compositions are moody and sophisticated, while the lyrics are either non-existent or linger in the air, then vanish without a trace."

AllMusic wrote: "With tracks as beautiful as the jazz/folk/soul hybrid of 'Train' and as incendiary as the funky 'Someday My Prince Will Come', Last Night is both focused and diverse, and one of His Name Is Alive's most consistently impressive albums, regardless of whether it's a dress rehearsal or a swan song."

== Track listing ==
1. Deep
2. Last Night
3. Crawlin'
4. Teardrops
5. Devil's Night
6. I Been Good Up till Now
7. I Have Special Powers
8. Do You Want to Come to My Party
9. Someday My Prince Will Come
10. I Can See Myself in Her
11. Maybe
12. Storm
13. Train
