= Slow Buildings =

Studio album by Pale Saints
- Released: 29 August 1994
- Recorded: Palladium Studios, Parr Street Studios
- Genre: Alternative rock
- Length: 57:55
- Language: English
- Label: 4AD
- Producer: Hugh Jones, Mark Freegard

Pale Saints chronology
In Ribbons (1992)	Slow Buildings (1994)

Singles from Slow Buildings
- 1. "Fine Friend" Released: 15 August 1994; 2. "Henry" / "One Blue Hill" Released: 1994 (promo only); 3. "Angel (Will You Be My)" Released: 1994 (promo only)

Professional ratings
Review scores
Source	Rating
AllMusic	3.5/5 stars

Slow Buildings is the third and final studio album from Pale Saints, released by 4AD on 29 August 1994. This was the band's first album following the departure of original singer and bassist Ian Masters and addition of Colleen Browne on bass/vocals; guitarist Meriel Barham, who had joined Pale Saints for their previous album In Ribbons, also took over lead vocal duties. Slow Buildings features the single "Fine Friend" (which was adapted, with new lyrics, from the 1981 song "Poison in the Airwaves" by Scottish band Persian Rugs). "Henry", "One Blue Hill", and "Angel (Will You Be My)", were released as radio singles only.

== Track listing ==
All tracks are written by Meriel Barham, Colleen Browne, Chris Cooper, and Graeme Naysmith. Additional writing on "Fine Friend" by Jamie Watson.

No.	Title	Length
1.	"King Fade"	4:12
2.	"Angel (Will You Be My)"	3:00
3.	"One Blue Hill"	5:24
4.	"Henry"	10:48
5.	"Under Your Nose"	2:51
6.	"Little Gesture"	2:26
7.	"Song of Solomon"	6:25
8.	"Fine Friend"	4:04
9.	"Gesture of a Fear"	7:05
10.	"Always I"	3:45
11.	"Suggestion"	7:47

== Singles ==
- "Fine Friend" (BAD4013, 15 August 1994)
1. "Fine Friend" – 4:03
2. "Special Present" – 4:07
3. "Marimba" – 6:46
4. "Reprise" ("Fine Friend") – 1:54

== Personnel ==
Pale Saints

- Colleen Browne – bass, vocals
- Chris Cooper – drums, percussion
- Graeme Naysmith – guitar
- Meriel Barham – vocals, guitar

Additional musicians

- Caroline Lavelle – cello
- Simon Clarke – flute
- Roddy Lorimer – trumpet
