= Luminous Orange =

Japanese rock band

- Origin: Yokohama, Japan
- Genres: Alternative rock, shoegazing, dream pop, bossa nova, lounge
- Years active: 1992–present
- Labels: Cream Cone Records; Friendly Science Enregisterments; Trattoria; Tone Vendor; Zankyo Record; Parallelogram
- Members: Rie Takeuchi
- Past members: Kazuko Sakamoto; Mieko Okazaki; Kaname Banba; Tarow Nisawa
- Website: www5a.biglobe.ne.jp/~luminous/

Luminous Orange is an alternative rock band formed 1992 in Yokohama, Japan. The band has evolved from an all female group to a solo project headed by composer, singer & guitarist Rie Takeuchi.

== History ==
Luminous Orange was originally conceived as a four-piece girl band by Rie Takeuchi in 1992 after being inspired by a Pale Saints concert. The group has often been categorized as alternative, dream pop, and shoegaze, although Takeuchi has expressed distate for labeling her music with genres. Because of their appearance on Cornelius' label Trattoria Records Luminous Orange has also been considered as Shibuya-kei.

In 1998, the band released the Puppy Dog Mail EP on former Pale Saints member Ian Masters' label Friendly Science Enregisterments. The title track from the EP subsequently appeared on a compilation released by Trattoria. That same year, Takeuchi made an appearance on Friendly Science Orchestra's Miniature Album, which was awarded Single of the Week by NME. The following year, Luminous Orange released the mini album Luminousorangesuperplastic, which drew praise from Shutoku Mukai of Number Girl. The band went on to release a maxi single in 2000 under the similar title of Luminousorangesugarplastic.

By 2002, the band had become Takeuchi's solo project with guest musicians. That same year brought the release of the album Drop You Vivid Colours on the Tone Vendor label. The album was described as being "far more richly produced, with multiple layers of sound giving it a texture and depth that previous albums lacked." Hiroko Kawakami of the band Caucus cited the album as one of the records which influenced her.

In 2004, Luminous Orange played at the CMJ Music Marathon in New York. The band returned to America in 2006, playing at SXSW in Austin, Texas. They performed again at the festival the following year.

Luminous Orange's next album, Sakura Swirl, was released in 2007. In addition to being released in Japan, it also had distribution in America, Europe and Australia. The album featured contributions from Ahito Inazawa, Hiroyuki Tateyama, Noritoshi Esaki and M. Fujii. Ian Masters provided lyrics as well as vocals and musical saw to the track "Silver Kiss". Masters joined Luminous Orange at two of their concerts that same year. That July, the band played two concerts in Taiwan, including an appearance at the Formoz Festival.

In 2009, Luminous Orange released the compilation album Best of Luminous Orange on Zankyo Record. Takeuchi explained that the label had asked about recording a new album but as Inazawa was busy with Vola and the Oriental Machine, they weren't in a position to do so. She thus saw an opportunity to re-release earlier tracks that had become more difficult to obtain.

The following year saw the release of Songs of Innocence, Luminous Orange's first original album in about two years. Guest musicians on the record included Takehito Kono of Lagitagida, Kensuke Nishiura, Ahito Inazawa, Christopher McGuire and Katsuya Yanagawa. The songs on the album were noted as combining "the overwhelming feeling of feedback and thunderous roaring, the persuasive and cool rhythms with beautiful melodies" as well as having odd time signatures and "mysterious melody lines with unexpected developments."

Luminous Orange released the digital single "Tigerlily Mixolydian" in 2013. The next year, the band released their seventh studio album, Soar, Kiss The Moon, on Parallelogram. The album was described as incorporating jazz and samba rhythms as well as "elements of postrock and math rock". Some of the instruments were noted as being recorded in live houses and old storehouses. Among the guests on the album were members of the Yoshida Yohei Group, who contributed wind instrument parts.

== Members ==
- Rie Takeuchi (composer, singer, guitarist, etc.)

=== Current supporting musicians ===
- Takehito Kouno (B) – Mahiruno
- Katsuya Yanagawa (G) – Caucus
- Kensuke Nishiura (Dr) – Sōtaiseiriron
- HIroko Kawakami (Cho) – Caucus

=== Past members ===
- Kazuko Sakamoto (B)
- Mieko Okazaki (Dr)
- Kaname Banba (Dr)
- Tarow Nisawa (B)

== Discography ==
=== Albums ===
- Vivid Short Trip (1996)
- Waiting for the Summer (1997)
- Sugarcoated (1998)
- Drop You Vivid Colours (2002)
- Vivid Short Trip 7 Stops Farther (Reissue) (2004)
- Sakura Swirl (2007)
- Songs of Innocence (2010)
- Soar, Kiss The Moon (2014)

=== EPs ===
- Puppy Dog Mail EP (1998)
- luminousorangesuperplastic (1999)
- luminousorangesugarplastic (2000)

=== Compilation(s) ===
- Best of Luminous Orange (2009)
