= The Comforts of Madness (album) =

Studio album by Pale Saints
- Released: 12 February 1990
- Studio: Blackwing (London)
- Genre: Shoegaze; dream pop
- Length: 41:06
- Label: 4AD
- Producer: John Fryer; Gil Norton

Pale Saints chronology
The Comforts of Madness (1990)	In Ribbons (1992)

The Comforts of Madness is the debut studio album by English alternative rock band Pale Saints. It was released on 12 February 1990 by 4AD.

The Comforts of Madness peaked at number 40 on the UK Albums Chart. On 17 January 2020, 4AD released a remastered and expanded reissue of the album for its 30th anniversary.

== Critical reception ==
Professional ratings
Review scores
Source	Rating
AllMusic	4.5/5 stars
Mojo	4/5 stars
NME	9/10
Pitchfork	7.6/10
Q	5/5 stars
Record Mirror	4/5
Uncut	9/10
Under the Radar	9/10

Reviewing The Comforts of Madness for NME, Simon Williams praised the album as an "unnervingly multi-dimensional collage of melody and friction" with "at least eight Great Pop Tunes, all hooklines and absolutely no stinkers." The magazine later named it the 45th best album of 1990.

In 2016, Pitchfork ranked The Comforts of Madness at number 21 on its list of the 50 best shoegaze albums of all time.

== Track listing ==
All tracks are written by Pale Saints (Chris Cooper, Ian Masters, and Graeme Naysmith), except where noted

No.	Title	Writer(s)	Length
1.	"Way the World Is"		2:40
2.	"You Tear the World in Two"		3:01
3.	"Sea of Sound"		5:52
4.	"True Coming Dream"		2:30
5.	"Little Hammer"		2:17
6.	"Insubstantial"		4:20
7.	"A Deep Sleep for Steven"		3:44
8.	"Language of Flowers"		2:54
9.	"Fell from the Sun"	Kendra Smith	4:45
10.	"Sight of You"		5:37
11.	"Time Thief"		3:26
Total length:			41:06

== Personnel ==
Credits are adapted from the album's liner notes.

- Pale Saints (Chris Cooper, Ian Masters, and Graeme Naysmith) – all instruments

Production

- Al Clay – engineering (tracks 4, 6–8, 11)
- Tim Davis – engineering assistance (tracks 4, 6–8, 11)
- John Fryer – production (tracks 1–3, 5, 9, 10), engineering (tracks 1–3, 5, 9, 10)
- Gil Norton – production (tracks 4, 6–8, 11)

Design

- Chris Bigg – art direction assistance, design assistance
- Bleddyn Butcher – group photography
- Vaughan Oliver – art direction, design
- Sarah Tucker – cat photography

== Charts ==
Chart (1990–2020)	Peak position
Scottish Albums (OCC)	49
UK Albums (OCC)	40
