= Faruq Z. Bey =

- Born: Jesse Davis; February 4, 1942; Detroit, Michigan, USA
- Died: June 1, 2012 (aged 70) Detroit, Michigan
- Genres: Free jazz
- Occupations: Musician, poet
- Instrument: Saxophone

Faruq Z. Bey (born Jesse Davis; February 4, 1942 – June 1, 2012) was an American jazz saxophonist and composer from Detroit, Michigan. Bey was known for his work with Griot Galaxy, which played distinct compositions, often by Bey. Odd meters and polyrhythms were a frequent feature of the group's tunes, which would give way to free sections. Originally started in 1972, Griot Galaxy settled into its most stable line-up around 1980, when Bey was joined by saxophonists David McMurray and Anthony Holland, as well as bassist Jaribu Shahid and drummer Tani Tabbal. Griot Galaxy played at the 1983 Detroit Montreux Jazz Festival (now the Detroit Jazz Festival), and toured Europe in the mid-1980s.

In the mid-1980s Bey was in a serious motorcycle accident that left him in a coma. Almost a decade passed before he returned to performing. He re-emerged with an all woodwind ensemble called The Conspiracy Winds Ensemble. He began to play in Speaking in Tongues and Hakim Jami's Street Band. He joined forces with The Northwoods Improvisers, who devoted several releases to Bey's music. His frequent collaborators, saxophonists Michael Carey and Skeeter Shelton, joined him on most of the Northwoods Improviser's recordings. He also played in Kindred, a quartet with Kennith Green, Kevin Callaway and Joel Peterson, and in Odu Afrobeat Orchestra. Among Bey's last ensembles was The Absolute Tonalist Society with Carey, Peterson and drummer Kurt Prisbe.

Some of his most noted releases are Kins, Opus Krampus and Live at the DIA with Griot Galaxy, and Auzar and Ashirai Pattern with The Northwoods Improvisers. Bey published two books of poetry, Year of the Iron Sheep and Etudes in Wanton Nesses, in addition to a theoretical/aesthetic manifesto Toward a "Ratio"nal Aesthetic (1989). Bey died on June 1, 2012. He had experienced long-term health issues including emphysema.

== Discography ==
As A Leader

- Atlan-tan Suite (Entropy Stereo, 2024)

With Griot Galaxy

- Live on WUOM 1979 (Two Rooms TR-010, 2025)
- Kins (Black & White, 1982)
- Live at the D.I.A. (Entropy Stereo, 1983)
- The Montreux/Detroit Collection- Volume Three: Motor City Modernists (1983)
- Opus Krampus (Sound Aspects, 1985)

With Northwoods Improvisers

- Hot House 2001 (Entropy/Codex)
- 19 Moons (Entropy Stereo, 2001)
- Ashirai Pattern (Entropy Stereo, 2002)
- People In Sorrow (Entropy/Codex, 2003)
- Auzar (Entropy Stereo, 2004)
- Journey Into The Valley (Entropy Stereo, 2004)
- Hymn for Tomasz Stanko (Qbico, 2005)
- Rwanda (Qbico, 2005)
- Hymn Book of the Anciency (Entropy/Codex, 2006)
- Infa'a (Qbico, 2006)
- Emerging Field (Entropy Stereo, 2009)
- Emerging Field: Bonus Tracks (Entropy/Codex)
- Primal Waters (Sagittarius A-Star, 2011)

With His Name Is Alive

- Silver Dragon (Silver Mountain, 2010)

With Synchron

- Synchron (Sagittarius A-Star, 2012)

With Faruq Z. Bey 4et

- Live at the Detroit Art Space (Sagittarius A-Star, 2012)

With Phil Ranelin

- Vibes From The Tribe (Tribe, 1975)

With The New Chamber Jazz Quintet

- Beneath Detroit: The Creative Arts Collective Concerts at The Detroit Institute Of Arts 1979-92 (Geodesic) w/ Leroy Jenkins
- Live at the DIA: November 27, 1982 https://beneathdetroit.com/archives/the-new-chamber-jazz-quintet-from-nov-27th-1982-full-concert/

With M.L. Liebler

- The Kurl of the Butterfly's Tongue (Detroit Radio Company, 2008)
- Gasoline: The Detroit Legacy Sessions (Detroit Radio Company, 2009)

With K.A.S. Serenity

- Return to Rainbow Bridge (POPP, 1996)

With Dr. Prof. Leonard King

- Strata Nova - Historic 1977-1983 Recordings (Uuquipleu, 2012)
- Later Then Is Latter Now (Uuquipleu, 2019)

With Keith Vreeland

- Bad Dog (2010)

With The Sun Messengers

- The Sun Messengers (Sun Sounds Records, 1982)

With Hakim Jami & The Street Band

- Volume 1 (Reparation Records)
- Volume 2 (Reparation Records, 2004)

With Media Jackals

- Vertical Hold (Adequate Records, 1981)
