= Spoonfed Hybrid =

English dream pop music duo

- Also known as: The Long Lost
- Genres: Dream pop
- Years active: 1993–1996
- Labels: Guernica Records; Farrago Records
- Past members: Ian Masters; Chris Trout

Spoonfed Hybrid were a dream pop duo from northern England in the early 1990s. The band was initially formed in 1993 by Ian Masters and Chris Trout as The Long Lost. Masters had just left the band he founded in 1987, Pale Saints, which continued without him. Trout had been the bass guitarist in A.C. Temple and had published solo and band material under the name Kilgore Trout.

Their self-titled debut album was released that same year through 4AD offshoot label Guernica Records. A single and mini-album followed before Masters and Trout went their separate ways. Songs were written by both members of the band, individually and collectively, and both sang and played most of the instruments. The first album was produced by Duncan Wheat, with the single and mini-album produced by the band themselves.

== Discography ==
- Spoonfed Hybrid Vinyl LP, cassette, and CD (Guernica, 1993)
- "Bullets and Bees" / "Messrs Hyde;" 7" vinyl; free with LP version of Spoonfed Hybrid
- "Scary Verlaine" 7" clear vinyl (Le Tatou Colérique, 1995)
- Hibernation Shock CD (Farrago Records, 1996)
