= Detrola (album) =

Studio album by His Name Is Alive
- Released: January 24, 2006
- Recorded: 2005
- Length: 38:11
- Label: Silver Mountain Media Group/Sony-BMG
- Producer: Warren Defever

His Name Is Alive chronology
Raindrops Rainbow EP (2005)	Detrola (2006)	XMMER (2007)

Professional ratings
Review scores
Source	Rating
Allmusic	4/5 stars
Pitchfork Media	(8.4/10)
Alternative Press	3/5 stars
Detroit Free Press	4/4 stars

Detrola is an album by His Name Is Alive, released in 2006. Four years after being dropped from the 4AD roster, HNIA released this album on their own Silver Mountain Media Group label (with major-label distribution from Sony-BMG). While many of the band's longtime fans (and 4AD devotees) had been disappointed with the group's final two albums for 4AD, fan reception to Detrola was quite positive, with many observing that it was finally a proper follow-up to 1998's 4AD release Ft. Lake.

Despite no longer being signed to 4AD, the record went a long way toward gaining back their fans from that era, while introducing the group to a new set of fans; the record was a considerable hit on modern rock radio and college rock charts. While long-time vocalist Karin Oliver does not appear on the album, having left the group in 1998, the majority of the vocals are handled by Oliver's cousin Andrea (stage name Andy FM), whose vocal style is quite similar to that of Oliver's, and Erika Hoffman, who had been contributing vocals since 1996's Stars on ESP. Lovetta Pippen, the sole vocalist for the final two 4AD albums, also appears as a background singer on "I Thought I Saw" and sings lead on "Seven Minutes." These factors gave the album a feel closer to their classic 4AD releases. In particular, many reviewers commented that "Your Bones" sounds like a track from the band's earliest albums on 4AD, and "You Need a Heart to Live" was a re-recorded version of a rare track from the band's 4AD era.

The album made many "best-of-lists" for 2006, including that of David Bowie, as noted on the band's website.

In 2007, an instrumental version of the album was released on the iTunes Store.

== Track listing ==
It has long been a tradition for HNIA to list two different titles for songs on the album sleeve, although the secondary title was usually a shortened version of the song's full title. The alternate song titles on Detrola (listed below in parentheses) were somewhat different, sometimes differing completely from the proper title. Initial promo releases of the album listed the songs by their alternate titles, and the final release provided the alternate titles on the inside of the CD case.

1. "Introduction (The Darkess Night)" – 2:29
2. "After I Leave U (Maybe Again When I Leave U)" – 3:46
3. "I Thought I Saw (Mama Don't You Think I Know)" – 4:16
4. "In My Dreams (Sometimes Screw)" – 2:57
5. "*C*A*T*S* (Here Forever Always)" – 3:29
6. "Your Bones" – 4:16
7. "You Need a Heart (You Need A Heart To Live)" – 4:07
8. "You and Me" – 0:18
9. "Get Your Curse (Summer Left Your Heart Behind)" – 3:39
10. "Seven Minutes (Seven Minutes In Heaven)" – 3:56
11. "Send My Face (I'll Send My Face To Your Funeral)" – 4:58
