= Warnings (album) =

Studio album by I Break Horses
- Released: 8 May 2020
- Length: 54:06
- Label: Bella Union

I Break Horses chronology
Chiaroscuro (2014)	Warnings (2020)

Professional ratings
Aggregate scores
Source	Rating
Metacritic	81/100
Review scores
Source	Rating
AllMusic	4.5/5 stars
Beats Per Minute	74%
The Line of Best Fit	8/10
Loud and Quiet	7/10
MusicOMH	3.5/5 stars
NME	4/5 stars
The Observer	3/5 stars
Under the Radar	9/10

Warnings is the third studio album by Swedish indie rock band I Break Horses. It was released on 8 May 2020 under Bella Union.

== Critical reception ==
Warnings was met with universal acclaim reviews from critics. At Metacritic, which assigns a weighted average rating out of 100 to reviews from mainstream publications, this release received an average score of 81, based on 11 reviews.

=== Accolades ===
Accolades for Warnings
Publication	Accolade	Rank	Ref.
Stereogum	Stereogum's 50 Best Albums of 2020 – Mid-Year	41	
Under the Radar	Under the Radar's Top 100 Albums of 2020	4	

== Track listing ==
Warnings track listing
No.	Title	Length
1.	"Turn"	9:00
2.	"Silence"	4:28
3.	"larm"	1:03
4.	"I'll Be The Death Of You"	4:37
5.	"denlillapåseavlycka"	1:59
6.	"The Prophet"	5:41
7.	"Neon Lights"	5:44
8.	"I Live At Night"	4:29
9.	"Baby You Have Travelled For Miles Without Love In Your Eyes"	4:24
10.	"Death Engine"	7:51
11.	"absolutamollpunkten"	2:17
12.	"Depression Tourist"	2:33
Total length:		54:06
