= Livonia (album) =

Studio album by His Name Is Alive
- Released: June 25, 1990
- Recorded: 1985–1990
- Studios: Warren's house, Livonia, Michigan; Garageland Studios, New Boston, Michigan
- Genres: Dream pop, ethereal wave
- Length: 35:28
- Language: English
- Label: 4AD
- Producers: Warren Defever, Ivo Watts-Russell, John Fryer

His Name Is Alive chronology
Livonia (1990)	Home Is in Your Head (1991)

Singles from Livonia
- 1. "How Ghosts Affect Relationships" / "If July" Released: 1990 (promo only)

Livonia is the debut album by His Name Is Alive. It was originally released by 4AD on June 25, 1990, in the United Kingdom and in 1992 on 4AD/Rykodisc in the United States.

== History ==
Livonia is the debut LP by Livonia, Michigan's His Name Is Alive (or HNIA). Frontman Warren Defever began recording on a cassette tape 4-track recorder in his parents' basement while still in high school. As a result, this album is made up of material originally recorded from 1985 through 1989, rough versions of which appeared in 1988 on a self-released cassette called I Had Sex With God.

In a 2006 interview, Defever recounts that he sent the cassette to 4AD label president Ivo Watts-Russell in 1988, who initially felt that Defever and his band "needed a lot of work." Ivo also said he wasn't interested in signing any more American bands, due to the difficulty of time zone differences and finding US distribution. He also suggested that Defever try Rough Trade's US branch. Defever responded that he had already been rejected by that label, and continued to submit cassettes to 4AD, with revised and improved versions of the songs appearing on each new tape.

Over time, Ivo and his This Mortal Coil partner John Fryer felt they could actually mix Defever's home recordings into something that 4AD could release, and the album finally appeared in the summer of 1990. Due to Ivo and Fryer's contribution, along with other superficial similarities, HNIA were often compared to This Mortal Coil during their early years.

The recordings originally consisted of Defever providing the bulk of the music, with Angie Carozzo providing vocals. Once Defever met Karin Oliver in college, he recruited her to become the band's primary vocalist. The album still credits Carozzo as a member, although very few of her vocals remain in the finished product (tracks 10 and 11), and she left the band shortly after the album's release.

Both "How Ghosts Affect Relationships" and "Darkest Dreams" appear as samples in EarthBound (1994) during the final fight against Giygas and his wounded states.

== Critical reception ==
Professional ratings
Review scores
Source	Rating
AllMusic	3.5/5 stars
Entertainment Weekly	B
NME	7/10
Select	2/5

Trouser Press noted that "upon its first appearance, Livonia was justifiably regarded as yet another sojourn into 4AD atmospherics: in its moody, ethereal translucence, coupled with femme vox and a seeming lack of direction, the album seemed doomed to exist in the label's pretty-but-insubstantial ghetto."

== Track listing ==
The album was available in the United States only as an import until 1992, when Rykodisc reissued the album on CD, with an instrumental bonus track called "Livonia" appearing at the end of the album. That bonus track was available only on the Rykodisc pressing and was not included on any subsequent 4AD reissues, until the 2024 archival box How Ghosts Affect Relationships: 1990-1993.

All tracks are written by His Name Is Alive.

Original 1990 4AD release
No.	Title	Length
1.	"As We Could Ever"	3:25
2.	"e-nicolle"	1:07
3.	"If July"	3:53
4.	"Some and I"	3:38
5.	"fossil"	1:35
6.	"E-Nicolle"	3:57
7.	"Caroline's Supposed Demon"	2:35
8.	"Fossil"	3:27
9.	"reincarnation"	1:58
10.	"You and I Have Seizures"	3:06
11.	"How Ghosts Affect Relationships"	3:54
12.	"Darkest Dreams"	3:03

1992 US Rykodisc edition bonus track
No.	Title	Length
13.	"Livonia"	4:10

== Personnel ==
=== Musicians ===
- Warren Defever – guitars, basses, samples
- Karin Oliver – vocals
- Angie Carozzo – vocals
- Damian Lang – percussion on "E-Nicolle", "Fossil" and "reincarnation"
- Jymn Auge – guitar on "Fossil"
- Tracy – bassoon on "You and I Have Seizures"

=== Production ===
- Ivo Watts-Russell and John Fryer – mixing (at Blackwing Studios)
- Vaughan Oliver/v23 – art direction and design
- Beverly Carruthers – photography
- Chris Bigg – design assistance

== Livonia Strings ==
The cover for His Name Is Alive's 2006 Livonia Strings release, with artwork based on the original Vaughan Oliver artwork from 1990.

In 2006, Defever released through his Silver Mountain Media record label a new version of Livonia, with instrumental strings versions of most of the songs from the original album. In the interview referenced above, Defever said the strings project was originally conceived as a joke while still signed to 4AD. He tried to convince the label that he had originally intended the album to be done with strings and he should be given the chance to re-record the album as "originally intended."

4AD actually allowed Defever to move forward with the project, but has refused to release the recordings. Defever re-recorded the project sometime after leaving the label, although details are scarce. It was actually first released as disc 5 of the Cloud Box 10-CD box set on Time Stereo in 2004, under the name Mystery Spot. While Defever gave detailed notes about each CD of this set, his notes on Mystery Spot only said "I don't wanna talk about it, but once you listen you can figure it out, if you're smart."

Defever also said his intentions for releasing the project was to show 4AD that there was still interest in Livonia in America, where the label is not keeping the album (along with the rest of HNIA's 4AD catalog) in print in the United States, despite nothing preventing them from doing so.

The strings CD release was a very limited edition; only 100 copies were made, which sold out very quickly. It is now currently available as a paid MP3 download from the Silver Mountain Media website.

In 2024, Livonia Strings was released as the 2nd LP in the more widely available, six-record archival set How Ghosts Affect Relationships: 1990-1993, the recording's first appearance on 4AD Records. It is referred to there only as "Bonus Tracks" and no details about its original incarnations as Mystery Spot or Livonia Strings are given. The LP also includes the track "Livonia" from the 1992 US Rykodisc version of Livonia, following the Livonia Strings program.

=== Track listing ===
No.	Title	Length
1.	"July"	12:33
2.	"Carolines"	13:43
3.	"Fossil"	12:33
4.	"Ghosts"	3:59
