= Chris Trout =

British songwriter, musician and music writer

Chris Trout is a British songwriter, musician and music writer. He has instigated or played in several Sheffield, Leeds and Nottingham based bands, including Kilgore Trout,A.C.Temple (1986–1991), Spoonfed Hybrid, Team 10.

He is also notable for his music criticism, as a significant contributor to Yorkshire-based Ablaze! (1987–1993, 2015–), London-based music magazine The Lizard (1993–1995) and music website Drowned In Sound (2011–2012).
