= The Dirt Eaters (EP) =

EP by His Name Is Alive
- Released: 20 April 1992
- Recorded: 1991
- Genre: Rock
- Length: 18:08
- Label: 4AD
- Producer: His Name Is Alive

His Name Is Alive chronology
Home Is in Your Head (1991)	The Dirt Eaters (1992)	Mouth by Mouth (1993)

The Dirt Eaters in an EP by His Name Is Alive, originally released by 4AD in early 1992. It has never been released on its own in the United States, as it was included on the 4AD/Rykodisc US reissue of Home Is in Your Head in 1992.

== History ==
The Dirt Eaters represented a step forward in the evolution of His Name Is Alive. While still recorded at HNIA leader Warren Defever's home, the small success of his first two LPs for 4AD had allowed him to considerably improve his home recording studio. Much more so than the previous releases, The Dirt Eaters is a song-oriented effort, with mostly ethereal folk songs replacing the sound collages and avant-pop of Livonia and Home Is in Your Head. Four songs were recorded for the EP in late 1991, and a remix of "Are We Still Married?" was also included. Released early in 1992, the EP was somewhat meant to promote this remix, for which a video by the Brothers Quay had been made. Therefore, the front cover says "Are We Still Married - His Name Is Alive - The Dirt Eaters."

== Track listing ==
=== Original 4AD release ===
The original 1992 release of The Dirt Eaters on 4AD (BAD2005) on vinyl and CD, contained the following track listing:

1. "Man on the Silver Mountain" – 3:37
2. "Are We Still Married?" – 2:59
3. "Is This the Way the Tigers Do?" – 3:37
4. "We Hold the Land in Great Esteem" – 4:03
5. "The Dirt Eaters" – 3:44

Only tracks one to four are listed on the sleeve, although "The Dirt Eaters", ostensibly a "hidden track," is referred to in the liner notes. Lyrics are given for tracks one to four, although these are actually the lyrics for tracks two to five. This was probably done so as to not have to print the lyrics for "Man on the Silver Mountain," a cover of the Rainbow song written by Ritchie Blackmore and Ronnie James Dio. By not printing the lyrics, HNIA and 4AD avoided having to obtain permission.

"Are We Still Married?" is remixed by Ivo Watts-Russell and John Fryer of This Mortal Coil. The duo had also done production work on HNIA's first two albums. This mix is sometimes called The Dirt Eaters Mix or the This Mortal Coil Remix.

"The Dirt Eaters" contains a sample of Jack Nicholson from the movie Ironweed: "I'd eat all the dirt in this yard for you. And all the weeds. And all the dog bones too, if you asked me." A later 4AD compilation called ...and dog bones too, which featured "The Dirt Eaters", was named after this part of the song.

Besides the Rainbow cover, all of the other songs are written by Defever, credited as His Name Is Alive, except for "The Dirt Eaters" which is by Melissa Elliot, a member of HNIA at this time, and the leader, not coincidentally, of a band called The Dirt Eaters.

=== Rykodisc US release and later 4AD reissue ===
The Dirt Eaters EP was originally available in the United States only as an import. When Rykodisc reissued the band's back catalog for American release in the summer of 1992, the tracks from the EP were included on the CD for Home Is in Your Head. With the Rykodisc CD long out of print, this has made The Dirt Eaters EP a rarity in the United States. When 4AD reissued Home Is in Your Head on CD in 1998, they used the same track listing, instead of reissuing The Dirt Eaters EP on its own.
