= Home Is in Your Head =

Studio album by His Name Is Alive
- Released: September 9, 1991
- Recorded: 1989–1990
- Genre: Dream pop
- Length: 48:19; 66:28 (Rykodisc version)
- Label: 4AD (CAD 1013)
- Producer: His Name Is Alive, Ivo Watts-Russell, John Fryer

His Name Is Alive chronology
Livonia (1990)	Home Is in Your Head (1991)	The Dirt Eaters EP (1992)

Alternative cover
- The cover for the 1992 Rykodisc US release of Home Is in Your Head. This was based on the back cover of the 4AD release.

Professional ratings
Review scores
Source	Rating
AllMusic	4.5/5 stars
Christgau's Consumer Guide	(neither)

Home Is in Your Head is the second studio album by His Name Is Alive, originally released via 4AD in the UK on September 9, 1991, and on Rykodisc in the United States in 1992.

== History ==
Like their 4AD debut, Livonia, His Name Is Alive's Home Is in Your Head comprises tracks that originated in Warren Defever's basement on a 4-track recorder, later remixed by Ivo Watts-Russell and John Fryer into something suitable for release.

"Sitting Still Moving Still Staring Outlooking" was later used in the 1996 film Jerry Maguire in a key scene when Tom Cruise is having a nervous breakdown.

== Release Details ==
"There's Something Between Us and He's Changing My Words" is a cover of a song by Bone Machine, which consisted of Defever, guitarist Jymn Auge and drummer Scott "Scoot" Mackenzie, and released their sole album in 1989. Auge had guested on Livonia, and, by this album, he was a full-time member of HNIA. "Man on the Silver Mountain" is a cover of a song by Rainbow.

A hidden song is included on the last track. After a brief moment of silence following the conclusion of "Dreams Are of the Body," a song called "The Other Body" begins. This is a demo track that ends abruptly, as the tape ran out during recording.

The album was only available in the United States as an import until 1992, when Rykodisc issued the album domestically on CD. The Rykodisc release, which is now out of print, also contained The Dirt Eaters EP, which had been released in the UK in early 1992. When 4AD reissued the album on CD in 1998, they also included these tracks. The Rykodisc version featured a different album cover, which was a slightly re-worked version of the back cover of the 4AD release.

== Track listing ==
All songs written by His Name Is Alive, unless noted.

Original 4AD release
No.	Title	Writer(s)	Length
1.	"Are You Comin' Down This Weekend?"		0:18
2.	"Her Eyes were Huge Things"		1:37
3.	"The Charmer"		2:14
4.	"Hope Called in Sick [Song of Schizophrenia, Part One]"		1:36
5.	"My Feathers Needed Cleaning [Song of Schizophrenia, Part Two]"		2:27
6.	"The Well [Song of Schizophrenia, Part Three]"		2:25
7.	"There's Something Between Us and He's Changing My Words"	Bone Machine	1:20
8.	"The Phoenix, a Pool of Ice"		0:50
9.	"Are We Still Married?"		2:51
10.	"Put Your Finger in Your Eye"		0:50
11.	"Home is in Your Head"		2:23
12.	"Why People Disappear"		4:17
13.	"Here Eyes are Huge"		1:11
14.	"Save the Birds"		0:23
15.	"Chances are We are Mad"		2:37
16.	"Mescalina"		0:48
17.	"Sitting Still Moving Still Staring Outlooking"		3:26
18.	"Very Bad a Bitter Hand"		3:02
19.	"Beautiful and Pointless"		2:25
20.	"Tempe"		3:25
21.	"Spirit and Body"		1:49
22.	"Love's a Fish Eye"		3:32
23.	"Dreams are of the Body/The Other Body"		2:39

Rykodisc release bonus tracks
No.	Title	Writer(s)	Length
24.	"Man on the Silver Mountain"	Ritchie Blackmore, Ronnie James Dio	3:46
25.	"Are We Still Married? [Remixed by Ivo Watts-Russell and John Fryer]"		2:59
26.	"Is This the Way the Tigers Do?"		3:37
27.	"We Hold the Land in Great Esteem"		4:03
28.	"The Dirt Eaters"		3:44

== Personnel ==
=== Musicians ===
- Karin Oliver – Vocals, guitar, songs
- Warren Defever – Guitar, bass, samples, songs, pencil guitar
- Melissa Elliott – Guitar, pencil guitar, songs
- Jymn Auge – Guitar, song
- Damian Lang – Drums, rainmaker, crashers, bone
- Denise James – Vocals, song
- Karen Neal – Vocals on "Is This the Way the Tigers Do?"

=== Production ===
- Ivo Watts-Russell and John Fryer – Mixing (at Blackwing Studios)
- Gus Shaw – Digital compilation, mastering
- Vaughan Oliver/v23 – Art direction and design
- Dominic Davies – Photography

== Release history ==
Country	Date	Label	Format	Catalogue #
United Kingdom	September 9, 1991	4AD	CD	CAD 1013 CD
United Kingdom	September 9, 1991	4AD	LP	CAD 1013
United Kingdom	September 9, 1991	4AD	Cassette	CAD C 1013
United States	July 21, 1992	Rykodisc	CD (with 5 bonus tracks)	RCD 20245
