= Hearts (I Break Horses album) =

Studio album by I Break Horses
- Released: August 22, 2011
- Studio: Home recordings, Stockholm, Sweden; Saraswati Studios, Izera Mountains, Poland
- Genre: Indie rock, shoegazing
- Length: 40:19
- Label: Bella Union
- Producer: Maria Lindén

I Break Horses chronology
Hearts (2011)	Chiaroscuro (2014)

Singles from Hearts
- 1. "Hearts" Released: July 18, 2011; 2. "Winter Beats" Released: September 5, 2011; 3. "Wired" Released: November 28, 2011

Professional ratings
Aggregate scores
Source	Rating
Metacritic	69/100
Review scores
Source	Rating
AllMusic	3/5 stars

Hearts is the debut studio album by Swedish duo I Break Horses. It was released in August 2011 by Bella Union.

== Track listing ==
All songs written by Maria Lindén (music) and Fredrik Balck (lyrics).

No.	Title	Length
1.	"Winter Beats"	4:45
2.	"Hearts"	3:53
3.	"Wired"	4:31
4.	"I Kill Your Love, Baby!"	4:48
5.	"Pulse"	4:45
6.	"Cancer"	5:10
7.	"Load Your Eyes"	4:40
8.	"Empty Bottles"	3:22
9.	"No Way Outro"	4:25

== Credits ==
Musicians

- Maria Lindén – vocals, guitars, bass, keyboards, piano
- Fredrik Balck – drums, percussion
- Jukka Rintamäki – bass, vocals, additional keyboards, guitars, percussion
- Patrik Johansson Bay – additional guitars
- Patrick Alvarsson – additional guitars, treatments, percussion
- Anders Gustafsson – drums (tracks 1 and 5)
- Sebastian Forslund – drums (track 6)
- Simon Raymonde – treatments (track 9)

Technical

- Produced by Maria Lindén
- Additional production by Jukka Rintamäki (tracks 1, 3, 5 and 7) and Patrick Alvarsson (tracks 6 and 8)
- Mixed and mastered by Hans Olsson Brookes

Visual

- Art direction by Vaughan Oliver
- Design by Vaughan Oliver, Brian Whitehead and Tom Skipp
- Illustrations by Vaughan Oliver, Marc Atkins and Terry Dowling
