= A.C. Temple =

English alternative rock band (1985–1991)

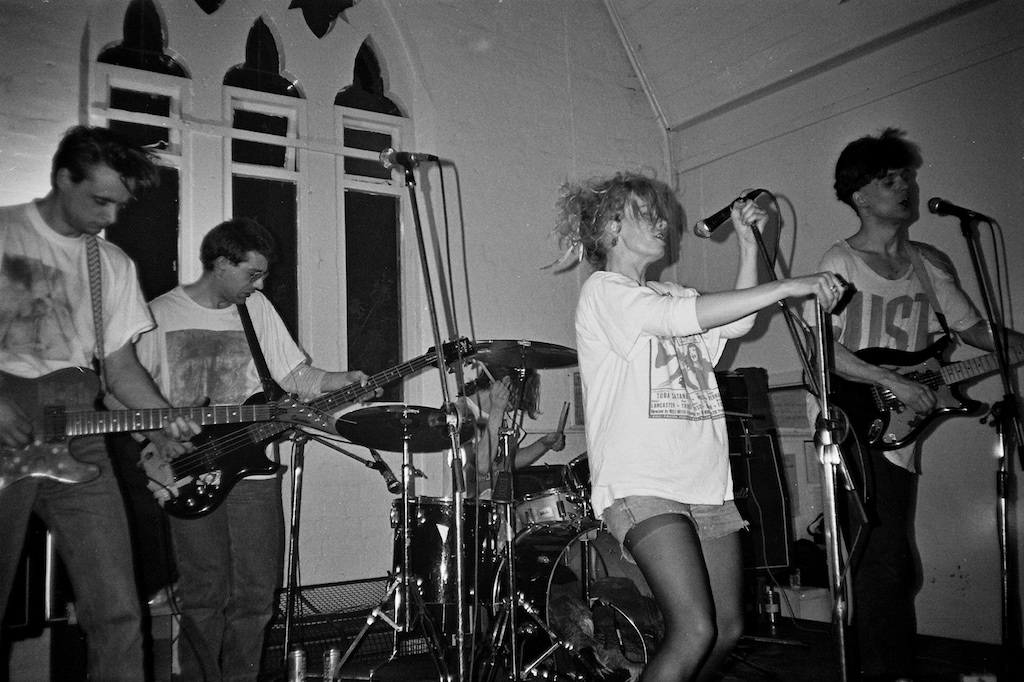
- AC Temple (1990)

Background information
- Origin: Sheffield, England
- Genres: Alternative rock
- Years active: 1985–1991
- Labels: Further, Blast First
- Past members: Jane Bromley; Noel Kilbride; Jayne Waterfall; Neil Woodward; Andy Hartley; Paul Dorrington; Tim Beckham; Chris Trout; Matt Silcox

A.C. Temple were an alternative rock band from Sheffield, England, formed in 1985. They released four albums before splitting up in 1991.

== History ==
The band were formed in 1985 by guitarist Noel Kilbride (guitar) and Neil Woodward (bass) with Jayne Waterfall (drums) and vocalist Dave Giles. Andy Hartley (bass) joined the following year with Jane Bromley taking over vocals. Mixing industrial noise with guitars and effects, they were compared in their early days to the likes of The Birthday Party and Sonic Youth. The band's first two albums, Songs of Praise and Blowtorch, were released on the Further label, subsequently signing to Blast First. They recorded a session for John Peel's BBC Radio 1 show in 1987. Guitarist Paul Dorrington joined in 1987 but departed the following year to form Tse Tse Fly. With bassist Chris Trout (formerly of Kilgore Trout), guitarist Tim Beckham and drummer Mat Silcox on board, the band released their third album, Sourpuss, in 1989. A final effort, Belinda Backwards, was released in 1991, before the band split up.

Trout later worked with former Pale Saints member Ian Masters in Spoonfed Hybrid.

Dorrington went on to join The Wedding Present, staying with the band between 1991 and 1995. He later co-founded Cha Cha Cohen and played guitar on their debut album.

== Band members ==
- Jane Bromley – vocals (1987-)
- Noel Kilbride – guitars
- Jayne Waterfall – drums (1985–1988)
- Neil Woodward – guitars (1985–1988)
- Andy Hartley – bass (1986–1988)
- Paul Dorrington – guitars (1987–1988)
- Tim Beckham – guitars (1989–1991)
- Chris Trout – bass (1989–1991)
- Matt Silcox – drums (1989–1991)
- Dave Giles – vocals (1985–1987)
- Ross Orton- drums (1990–1991)

== Discography ==
=== Albums ===
- Songs of Praise (1987) Further

"Ulterior" / "Make Mine Music" / "A Motel in Kansas" / "Fear No More the Heat of the Sun" / "All Hail Discordia" / "90 Seconds"

- Blowtorch (1988) Further

"Mincemeat" / "Yield" / "I Dream of Fraud" / "American" / "Weekend" / "Sheikh" / "Chinese Burn" / "Shimmer Queen" / "Hank" / "Armache"

- Sourpuss (1989) Blast First

"Sundown Pet Corner" / "Miss Sky" / "Stymied" / "Mother Tongue" / "Crayola" / "Devil You Know" / "Horsetrading" / "A Mouthful" / "Faith in a Windsock"

- Belinda Backwards (1991) Blast First

"Glitterhall" / "Silver Swimmer" / "Half-Angel" / "Come Sunrise" / "Girlseye" / "Lifesize" / "Spacebore" / "Skyhooks" / "Baby Seals" / "P2"

=== Singles ===
- "Miss Sky" (1989) (flexi-disc with The Catalogue magazine – split with Beme Seed)
- "Miss Sky"/"Undercurrent" (1993) Ablaze! (flexi-disc with Ablaze! magazine – split with The Wedding Present)
