= Chiaroscuro (I Break Horses album) =

Studio album by I Break Horses
- Released: 21 January 2014
- Genre: Electronic
- Label: Bella Union

I Break Horses chronology
Hearts (2011)	Chiaroscuro (2014)	Warnings (2020)

Professional ratings
Aggregate scores
Source	Rating
Metacritic	74/100
Review scores
Source	Rating
MusicOMH	4/5 stars

Chiaroscuro is the second studio album by Swedish duo I Break Horses. It was released in January 2014 under Bella Union.

== Track list ==
No.	Title	Length
1.	"You Burn"
2.	"Faith"
3.	"Ascension"
4.	"Denial"
5.	"Berceuse"
6.	"Medicine Brush"
7.	"Disclosure"
8.	"Weigh True Words"
9.	"Heart to Know"
