= XMMER =

Xmmer

Studio album by His Name Is Alive
- Released: September 18, 2007
- Recorded: 2007
- Genre: Rock and roll
- Length: 38:07
- Label: Silver Mountain Media Group/Sony-BMG
- Producer: Warren Defever

His Name Is Alive chronology
Detrola (2006)	Xmmer (2007)

Professional ratings
Review scores
Source	Rating
Allmusic	4/5 stars
CMJ	No Rating
FILTER	
Pitchfork Media	(5.8/10)
XLR8R	No Rating

Xmmer is His Name Is Alive's follow-up to 2006's Detrola, released in the USA on September 18, 2007. Stylistically, it is very similar to its predecessor, featuring a wide variety of the many styles the band had explored in the past. In Warn Dever's notes on the album (available on the band's website), it becomes apparent that he meant the album as a follow-up or companion piece to Detrola; "Go To Hell Mountain" is even described as a sequel to the previous album's "I Thought I Saw You Moving." One major difference is that singer Andy FM, who shared vocal duties with HNIA veterans Erika Hoffman and Lovetta Pippen on Detrola, sings every track here.

An instrumental version of the album was made available as a paid MP3 download from the Silver Mountain Media website on October 2, 2007.

== Track listing ==
1. "Young Blood" – 3:07
2. "Go to Hell Mountain" – 3:43
3. "The Wolf Put His Mouth on Me" – 3:47
4. "How Dark Is Your Dark Side" – 4:43
5. "What Color Was the Blood" – 3:11
6. "Oh Miss Flower" – 1:12
7. "Put It in Your Mind" – 3:42
8. "Sangaree" – 2:57
9. "Intra Ultra" – 1:06
10. "Come Out the Wilderness" – 3:56
11. "When You Fall for Someone" – 3:01
12. "Come to Me" – 3:47
