= I Break Horses =

Swedish band

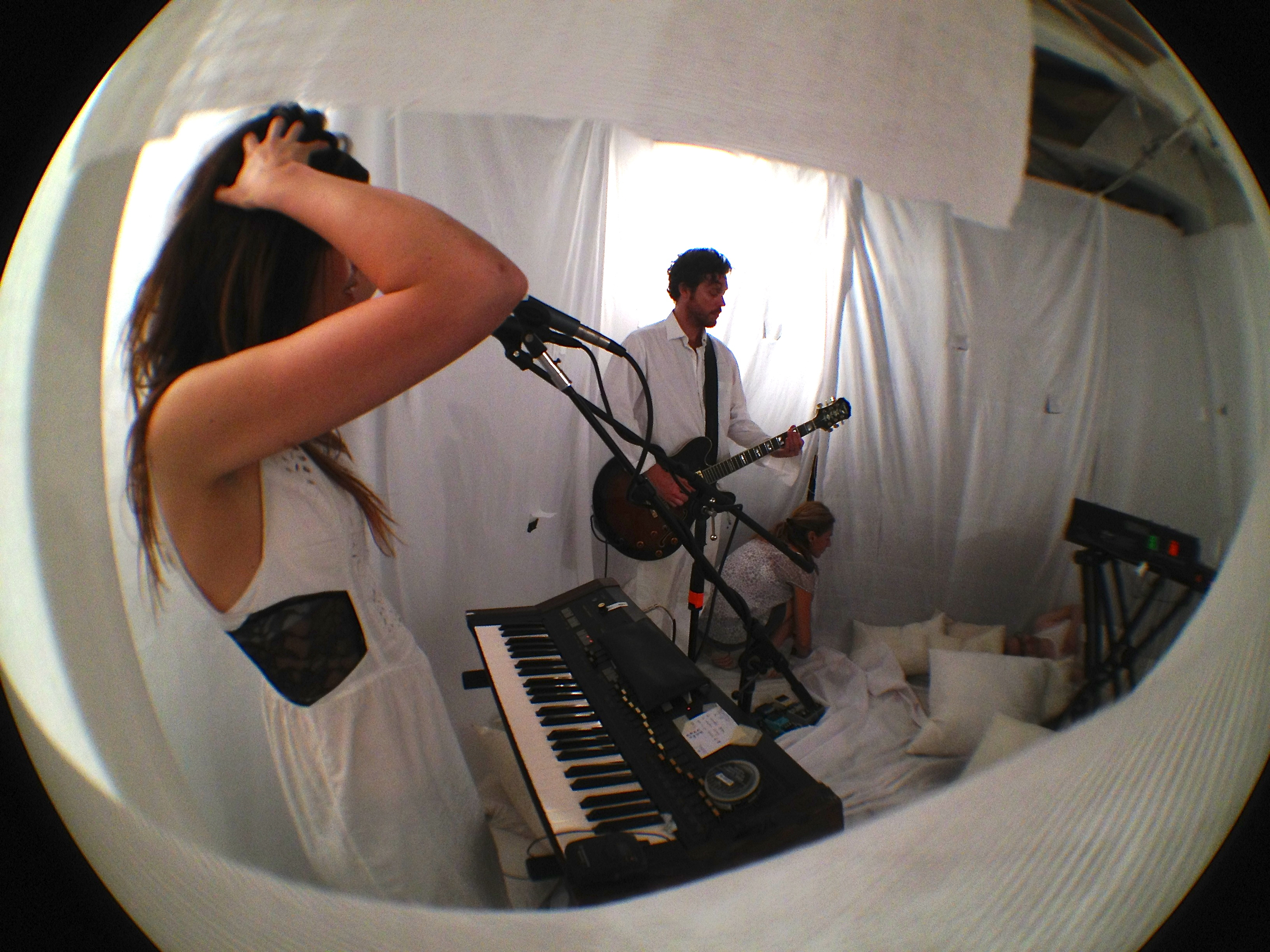
- I Break Horses at Room 205

Background information
- Origin: Stockholm, Sweden
- Genres: Indie rock Electronic music Shoegazing
- Years active: 2008–present
- Label: Bella Union
- Members: Maria Lindén; Fredrik Balck
- Website: http://www.ibreakhorses.se/

I Break Horses are a Swedish indie rock band made up of Maria Lindén and Fredrik Balck. The band took its name from a song of the same name by Bill Callahan.

== History ==
I Break Horses' debut studio album Hearts was released on 22 August 2011 on Bella Union. The album has garnered favorable reviews. I Break Horses accompanied M83 on an American tour. It accompanied Sigur Rós on tour in 2013.

Chiaroscuro, the band's second album, was released 20 January 2014, followed by an intimate gig at the Village Underground in Shoreditch, London, UK, to a sell out crowd, ahead of their Stateside tour that spring. Their third album, Warnings, released in 2020 was described as Woozy Synthscapes by Phil Mongredien in the Observer.

== Musical style ==
The Guardian music critic Hermione Hoby described their music as "heady, sumptuously textured soundscapes", while Pitchfork music critic Ian Cohen comments that they "immerse themselves in homemade shoegaze, the kind that's made by computers for computers. It's an approach and sound that's crossed language barriers for the past 20 or so years as bands strive to approximate Loveless without the benefit of a label they can bankrupt in the process." 2020 single "I'll Be the Death of You" was inspired by early OMD and Primal Scream's Screamadelica (1991).

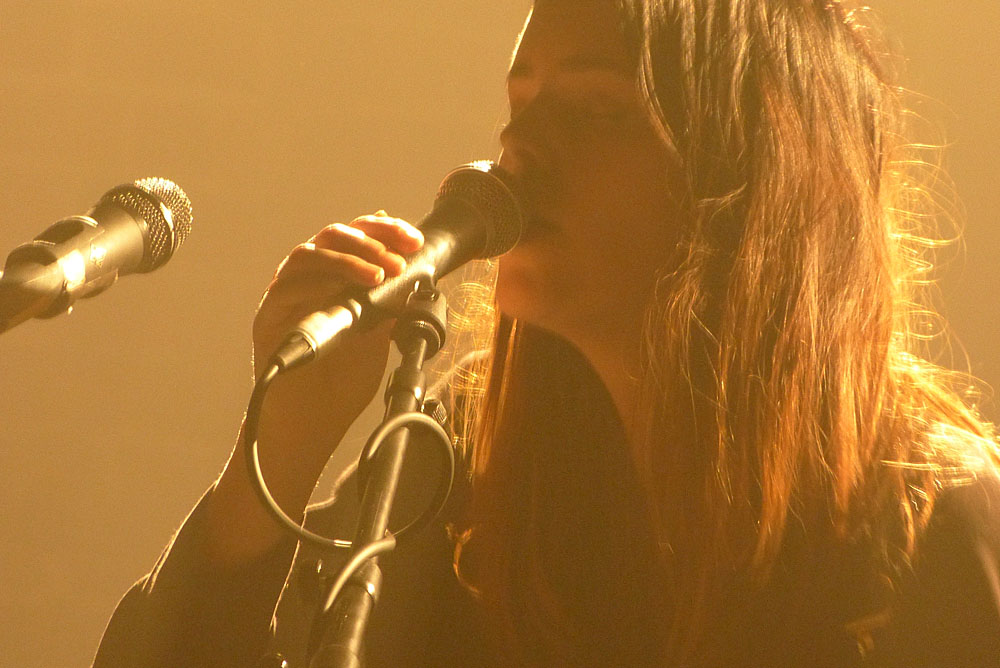
I Break Horses live at Village Underground Shoreditch London

== Discography ==
=== Albums ===
- Hearts (2011)
- Chiaroscuro (2014)
- Warnings (2020)

=== EPs ===
- Remix (2014)

=== Singles ===
- "Winter Beats" (2011)
- "Hearts" (2011)
- "Faith" (2013)
- "Denial" (2013)
- "I'll Be the Death of You" (2020)
- "Death Engine" (2020)

=== Guest appearances ===
- Korallreven - "Mantras" and "Ki" from Second Comin' (2014)
- Lushlife + CSLSX - "The Waking World" from Ritualize (2016)
