= Ft. Lake =

Album by His Name Is Alive

Studio album by His Name Is Alive
- Released: June 22, 1998
- Recorded: 1997–1998
- Genre: Rock
- Length: 51:35
- Label: 4AD
- Producer: Steve King, His Name Is Alive

His Name Is Alive chronology
Nice Day EP (1997)	Ft. Lake (1998)	Always Stay Sweet (1999)

Ft. Lake ("Fort Lake") is an album by His Name Is Alive, released by 4AD in 1998.

Professional ratings
Review scores
Source	Rating
Allmusic	4.5/5 stars
Christgau's Consumer Guide	(neither)
The Gazette	9/10
Pitchfork	6.5/10

== History ==
Work on Ft. Lake ("Fort Lake") began shortly after completion of the Nice Day EP, with the same newly stable lineup of leader Warren Defever on guitar, Chad Gilchrist on bass, Trey Many on drums, and vocalists Karin Oliver, Lovetta Pippen, and Dara Albro (All Virgos Are Mad and Nice Day EP). Defever stated in an interview around the time of the album's release that he was trying to have less control, and focus more on being the main songwriter and guitarist. He even went so far as to work with an outside producer for the first time, recruiting Steve King, who had previously produced Aretha Franklin and George Clinton.

The album's recording also coincided with the start of big changes at 4AD. During this era, 4AD co-founder and president Ivo Watts-Russell made plans to sell the label back to Beggars Banquet, from which he had purchased sole interest back in 1981 (this deal was completed in early 1999); 4AD's distribution contract with Warner Bros. Records in the USA had come to an end; and Vaughan Oliver and his v23 design firm (whose distinctive covers had virtually defined the label's aesthetic) announced plans to break away from 4AD, designing covers on a less frequent basis for the label.

Most importantly around this time, His Name Is Alive signed their first real contract with 4AD. Previously, Ivo had a loose arrangement with Defever to release what he was interested in, leaving Defever free to pursue many independent releases and side projects. With the new regime, the relationship between Defever and 4AD was now more of a traditional contract between a band and a record label, bringing with it increased commercial expectations. Probably not coincidentally, Ft. Lake is one of the least artsy and most accessible LPs in the band's catalog.

Recorded over 1997 and 1998 at Defever's Time Stereo studio, the album was released on 4AD (CAD8009 on LP and CAD8009CD) in the UK in late June 1998. Due to 4AD's reorganization and their finding distribution in the USA, the CD was not released in America until November.

== Sound ==
The sound of the album is very diverse, touching on all the many styles that HNIA had explored before, along with several new ones. In particular is a newly found interest in funk, soul and R&B, foreshadowing the next two HNIA albums on 4AD, where Pippen (a professional gospel and soul singer before joining HNIA) became the primary vocalist. "How It's Gotta Be" continues the Motown influence that had been prevalent on Nice Day, while "Red Haired Girl" combines rockabilly with a chorus reminiscent of shoegazer bands.

Many musical interludes are provided by Defever's electronic side project Robot World.

The alternate cover used for the limited edition vinyl LP version of Ft. Lake. A 7-inch EP featuring three bonus tracks was included with this release.

== Track listing ==
1. Don't Glue the World (4:05)
2. Everything Takes Forever (4:06)
3. The Waitress (3:25)
4. No Hiding Place Down Her (4:32)
5. Can't Always Be Loved (2:33)
6. Wish I Had a Wishing Ring (6:06)
7. Red Haired Girl (4:51)
8. Spirit Needs a Spirit Tool (3:03)
9. Up Your Legs Forever (3:45)
10. How It's Gotta Be (2:07)
11. Always Turn Me On (4:25)
12. Rock & Roll Girl from Rock & Roll City (5:08)
13. Last American Blues (3:29)

"Wish I Had a Wishing Ring" was edited down from a version that runs at 17:16. The full-length version can be found on the CD single for "Can't Always Be Loved."

A 7-inch EP called "Woodstock" was included with the limited edition LP. The tracks on this EP are:

1. Woodstock (4:37)
2. Swan Song (1:32)
3. Last Train (3:32)

These three songs were included on the Japanese CD release of Ft. Lake.
