= Mouth by Mouth =

Studio album by His Name Is Alive
- Released: April 13, 1993
- Recorded: 1992
- Genre: Dream pop
- Length: 49:11
- Label: 4AD
- Producer: His Name Is Alive

His Name Is Alive chronology
The Dirt Eaters (1992)	Mouth by Mouth (1993)	King of Sweet (1993)

Alternative cover
- The cover for the 4AD vinyl release of Mouth By Mouth.

Mouth by Mouth is the third studio album by American rock band His Name Is Alive, released by 4AD in 1993.

== Recording ==
While Karin Oliver sang lead vocals on nearly all of His Name Is Alive's songs up to this point, Mouth by Mouth used a wide variety of Warren Defever's associates on vocals. The lead vocalists on the album are as follows: Karen Neal sings tracks 1, 2 and 4; Karin Oliver sings tracks 3, 5, 7, 10, 12, 15 and 17; Chelle Marie Ehlers sings tracks 6 and 8; and Denise James sings tracks 11, 13, 14 and 16.

== Critical reception ==
Professional ratings
Review scores
Source	Rating
AllMusic	4.5/5 stars
Calgary Herald	B+
Q	4/5 stars
The Village Voice	A−

Many critics have described Mouth by Mouth as a more conventional effort by His Name Is Alive than their previous albums. Robert Christgau of The Village Voice reviewed the album favorably, describing it as "Big Star's Third as witting aesthetic strategy rather than failed attempt to make the world go away."

In a retrospective review, AllMusic's Heather Phares described Mouth by Mouth as "a high point in His Name Is Alive's career". Richard Fontenoy wrote in The Rough Guide to Rock that the album resembled "a 70s heavy-rock album produced by a hyperactive and easily distracted child with an interest in trying every possible effect, level and mixing technique".

== Track listing ==
All tracks written by Defever, credited as His Name Is Alive, except 4, 9 and 16, written by Melissa Elliott, and 12, a cover of a Big Star track, written by Alex Chilton, credited here as "LX Chilton."

=== 4AD releases ===
CD release (CAD3006CD)

1. "Baby Fish Mouth" - 2:32
2. "Lip" - 2:57
3. "Cornfield" - 3:15
4. "In Every Ford" - 3:43
5. "Lord, Make Me a Channel of Your Peace" - 2:17
6. "Drink, Dress and Ink" - 2:30
7. "Where Knock Is Open Wide" - 2:46
8. "Can't Go Wrong Without You" - 3:14
9. "Jack Rabbits" - 1:50
10. "Sort Of" - 1:03
11. "Sick" - 3:50
12. "Blue Moon" - 2:15
13. "Ear" - 2:02
14. "Lemon Ocean" - 2:47
15. "The Torso" - 3:23
16. "The Dirt Eaters" - 4:47
17. "The Homesick Waltz" - 4:00

"The Dirt Eaters" is a different version than appeared on The Dirt Eaters EP, a rock and roll version replacing the acoustic version that appeared on the EP. The Jack Nicholson sample that appeared on the EP version appears again, although shortened (removing the part where he says "And all the weeds.")

The 4AD vinyl LP release (CAD3006) uses several different samples and mixes for some of the songs, and does not include "The Homesick Waltz," despite having the lyrics for it in the inner sleeve.

The 4AD cassette release (CADC3006) is similar in mixing and sampling to the CD release, but like the LP does not include "The Homesick Waltz."

The 4AD CD version is currently available by 4AD's website, and also on music download services like eMusic and iTunes.

=== 4AD/Warner Brothers USA release ===
1. "Baby Fish Mouth" - 2:32
2. "Lip" - 2:57
3. "Cornfield" - 3:15
4. "In Every Ford" - 3:43
5. "Lord, Make Me a Channel of Your Peace" - 2:17
6. "Drink, Dress and Ink" - 2:30
7. "Where Knock Is Open Wide" - 2:46
8. "Can't Go Wrong Without You" - 3:14
9. "Jack Rabbits" - 1:50
10. "Sort Of" - 1:03
11. "Sick" - 3:50
12. "Blue Moon" - 2:15
13. "Ear" - 2:02
14. "Lemon Ocean" - 2:47
15. "The Torso" - 3:14
16. "The Dirt Eaters" - 4:24

As mentioned above, several samples are missing on this release, in comparison to the 4AD UK release, along with the track "The Homesick Waltz." Different mixes are used for several songs, many with a "hotter" mix, giving it a more "rock" sound to supposedly appeal to the USA grunge fad. Most noticeable is "The Dirt Eaters," which does not include the Jack Nicholson sample, or the ethereal echo on Denise James' vocals. This version is out of print. The UK version is now available in the US as electronic downloads from sites like eMusic or iTunes.

== Personnel ==
- Warren Defever – guitar, sampling
- Karin Oliver – vocals, cello
- Melissa Elliott – guitar
- Denise James – vocals
- Damian Lang – drums
- Elden M. – vocals, sound effects
- Trey Many – drums
- Chelle Marie – vocals
- Karen Neal – vocals
