= Ablaze! =

British indie music fanzine

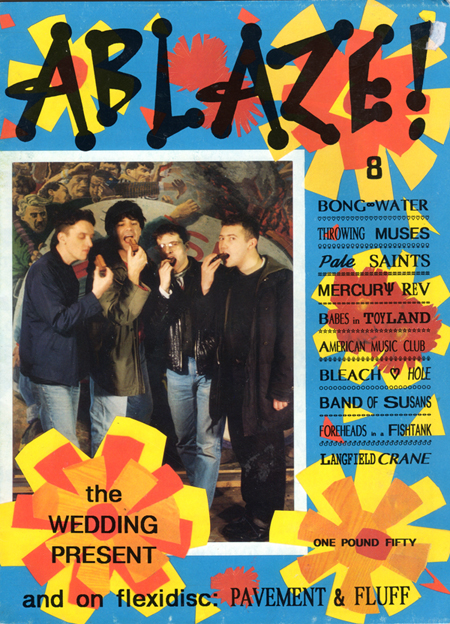
Front cover of Ablaze! issue 8, 1991, featuring The Wedding Present.

Ablaze! is a British indie music fanzine, produced in Manchester and Leeds. Ablaze! ran for ten issues between 1987 and 1993, and returned for an eleventh issue in 2015. Ten issues of the zine were compiled into a book, The City Is Ablaze!, published in 2012.

== History ==
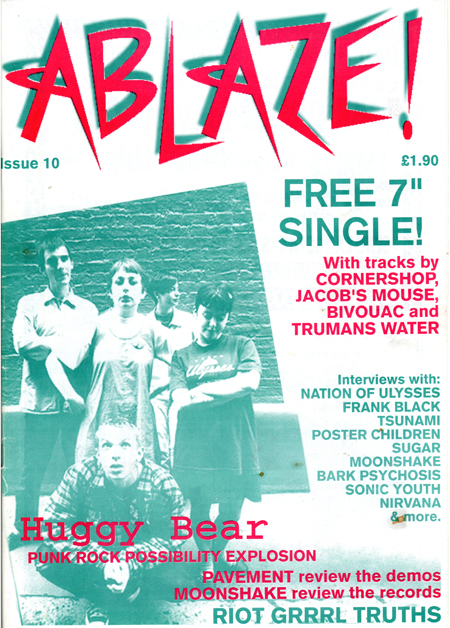
From the cover of Ablaze! issue 10, from 1993, the Riot Grrrl issue. Huggy Bear were the cover stars.

Ablaze! ran for ten issues between 1987 and 1993, and returned for an eleventh issue in 2015.

In the 1980s Ablaze! was an early champion of UK "noisenik" bands, such as Dog Faced Hermans, The Wedding Present and the Walkingseeds, and US noise rock and grunge bands such as Sonic Youth, Dinosaur Jr, Throwing Muses, Pixies, Mudhoney and Nirvana.

In the 1990s Ablaze! continued to champion many of the indie, shoegaze and punk bands of the era, such as The Pastels, My Bloody Valentine and Lush from the UK, Sugar and Nation of Ulysses from the USA. Ablaze! was influential in propagating the Riot Grrrl movement in the UK.

From issue 5 a free flexi disc was given away with each issue, and with issue 10 a free 7" single. These featured exclusive tracks from acts such as The Wedding Present, Pavement, and Cornershop.

From its eighth issue onwards the fanzine was distributed across the UK, Europe and North America.

== Ethos ==
The style of Ablaze! was informed by the DIY ethic that had grown out of punk, which eschewed involvement with the mainstream, especially non-independent corporate record labels. The tone of the content was more personal and more political than the mainstream UK music press, as can be seen by this quote from Karren Ablaze! in 1993:

Ablaze! is a fanzine because we are fanz, fanatics, zealots, extremists, we are wild for stuff we're wild for and that fact can't change, except these passions are so real they have sell-by dates, determined by my own chemistry.

Emblematic of this approach was the record review section of Ablaze!, which gave humorous and acerbic appraisals of the latest releases.

Ablaze! also stood out for its feminist perspective, and later Riot Grrrl perspective, on the underground music scene, where most often both the musicians and the commentators were male. An extended editorial in Issue 7 (1990) titled "New voices, new guitars" argued for "music that celebrates a non phallic sexuality" against the "hackneyed and objectionable thrustings of male rock". Issue 10 included Girlspeak, the manifesto of Girl Power International, and "Five Strategies for the Unleashing of Girl Power", which readers were encouraged to photocopy and distribute.

Ablaze! operated an international fanzine distribution service, 'Worldwide Contagion', and in its pages featured coverage of the UK fanzine scene, as well as coverage of fanzines and other alternative publications in Europe and North America.

== Contributors ==
Ablaze! was edited, and principally written, designed, and edited by Karren Ablaze!. Other contributors included writers Lucy Nation (Chris Trout), Gavin B., Justine Wolfenden (Hemiola Records), Steve Albini, Andrew Truth, Mark Williams, Ian Michael Hodgson, Bela Emerson, John Robb, Terry Bloomfield, Richard Rouska, Simon Morris of the Ceramic Hobs, graphic designer William Potter, and photographers Ian T Tilton, Greg Neate, and Tony Woolgar.

== Legacy ==
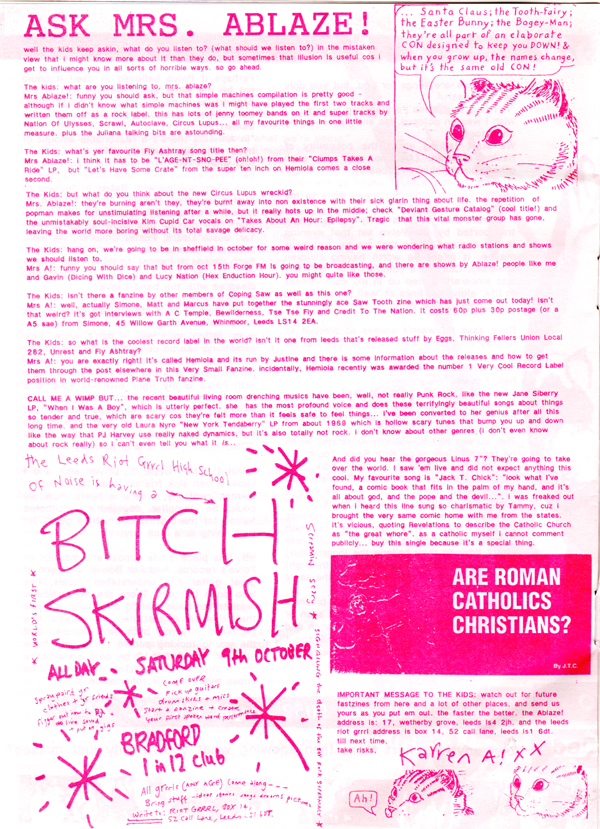
"Ask Mrs Ablaze" page from the final 'mini Ablaze!' featuring advert for aRiot Grrrl gig at the 1 in 12 Club in Bradford, 1993

Karren Ablaze! went on to front the Riot Grrl groups Coping Saw and Wack Cat. She wrote the feminist adventure novel Revolution on the Rock, and has a blog on Medium.com.

There has been growing interest in the pre-Internet era of fanzines. Music critic Simon Reynolds wrote about the continuing legacy and appeal of the fanzine movement for The Guardian in 2009, and in the same year Karren Ablaze! was invited by The Cribs to write about fanzines in general, and Ablaze! in particular during their guest editorship of The Guardian music section. Ablaze! is featured in Teal Triggs book Fanzines (Thames and Hudson, 2010).

Ablaze! has been cited in discussions about women in rock music, including the books Sexing the Groove: Popular Music and Gender (Routledge, 1997), and Riot Grrrl. Revolution Girl Style Now! (Black Dog, 2009).

== Books ==
- The City is Ablaze!: The Story of a Post-Punk Popzine, 1984-1994. Self-published / Mittens On, 2012. ISBN 978-0957427006.
