= Pale Saints =

English alternative rock band

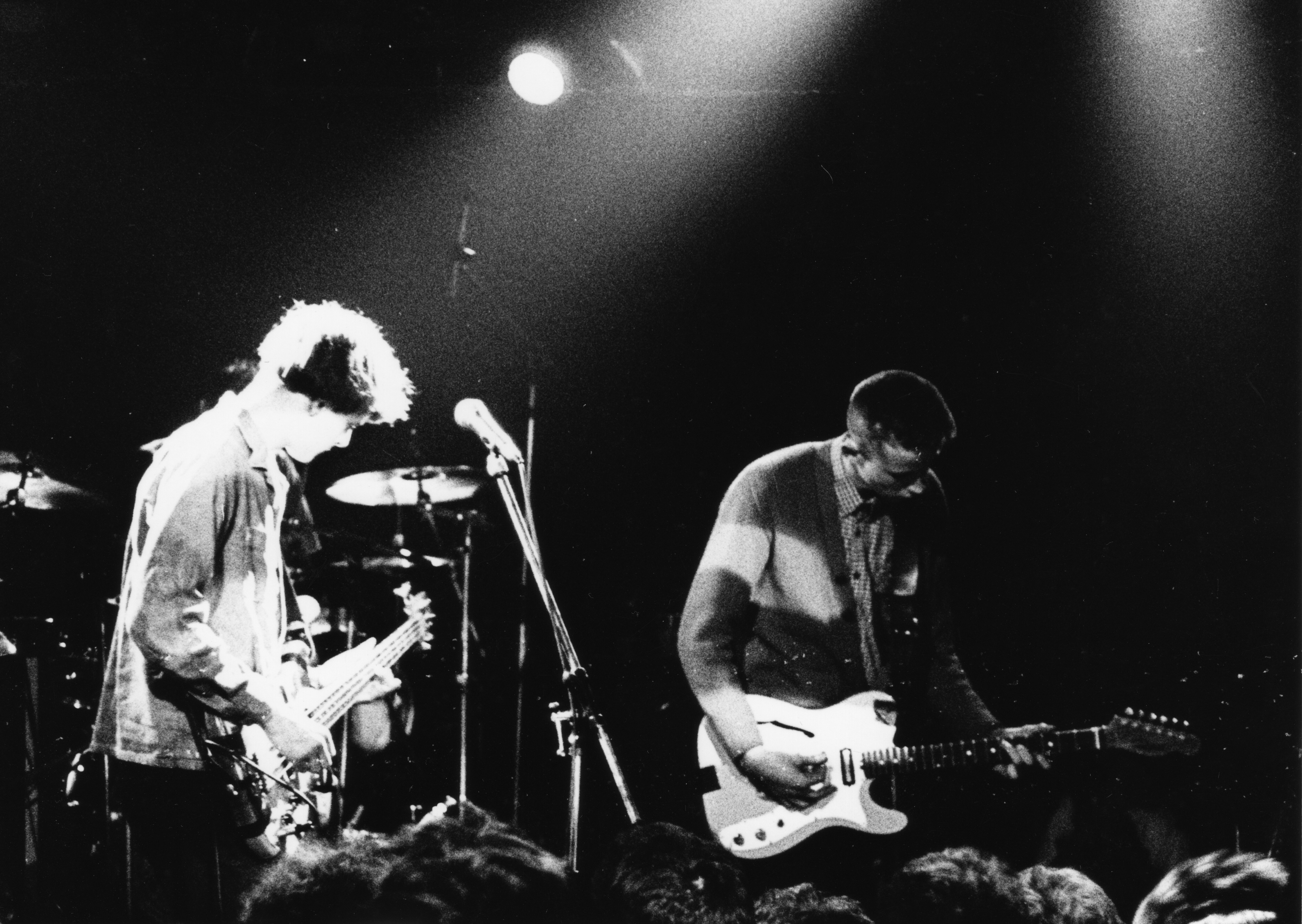
- Pale Saints performing live in 1990

Background information
- Origin: Leeds, England
- Genres: Shoegaze; dream pop; indie pop; alternative rock
- Years active: 1987–1996
- Label: 4AD
- Past members: Graeme Naysmith; Chris Cooper; Ian Masters; Ashley Horner; Meriel Barham; Colleen Browne

Pale Saints were an English alternative rock and shoegaze band formed in 1987 in Leeds by singer-bassist Ian Masters, guitarist Graeme Naysmith and drummer Chris Cooper.

== History ==
The group began as a jangly indie pop band influenced by Primal Scream's early sound. By the time they recorded their first EP, Barging Into the Presence of God, released in 1989, the band went into a direction that displayed a mix of Ian Masters' ethereal, choirboy-like vocals along with dark atmospheric and noisy pop tunes. Ashley Horner from Edsel Auctioneer briefly joined the band on guitar in the same year. The band was signed to 4AD Records after their first London show by the label's chief Ivo Watts-Russell.

The group's first album, The Comforts of Madness, was released in 1990 and reached the top 40 of the UK Albums Chart. The album's tracks were produced by John Fryer and Gil Norton. The album includes a cover version of "Fell from the Sun" by Opal.

In late 1990, Meriel Barham, the original vocalist of Lush, joined the band as second guitarist and vocalist. Barham contributed backing vocals and guitars to the Chris Allison produced Half-Life EP, then joined permanently for the Nancy Sinatra cover "Kinky Love", which gave the band a minor hit single as part of Flesh Balloon EP. In 1992 the band recorded their second full-length album, In Ribbons, which was produced by Hugh Jones. Ian Masters left the band in 1993, citing his lack of enthusiasm for touring, unlike the remaining members of the band and their record label 4AD. Former Heart Throbs bassist Colleen Browne joined afterwards.

Sticking with producer Hugh Jones, the group released the Fine Friend EP in mid-1994, followed by their third album, Slow Buildings.

The group toured Europe and the United States in late autumn 1994. Their final studio recording was a version of "Jersey Girl" for the Tom Waits tribute album Step Right Up. Meriel Barham departed in September 1995, and the group eventually disbanded in 1996.

In conjunction with the August 2020 Record Store Day release of the Japanese singles compilation Mrs. Dolphin on vinyl for the first time, Masters worked with director and Big Beautiful Bluebottle bandmate Terako Terao to make a video for "Sight of You".

Guitarist Graeme Naysmith died on 4 April 2024.

== Post-band projects ==
Masters continues to create music, often of an experimental nature. His first project after Pale Saints was Spoonfed Hybrid with former A.C. Temple member Chris Trout. They released their self-titled debut album in 1993 and their second album, Hibernation Shock, in 1996. In 1994, Masters, recording under the name Pail Saint, released the album Noise Bucket on Time Stereo, the label run by His Name Is Alive auteur Warren Defever. Masters and Defever then teamed up and began to release music as ESP Summer. In autumn 1998, Masters released a 7-inch EP under the name Friendly Science Orchestra entitled Miniature Album, which became an NME 'Single of the Week'. As of 2005, Masters lived in Japan. His projects, including Wingdisk with Mark Tranmer of Gnac and the Montgolfier Brothers, can be viewed on his website, The Institute of Spoons.

Naysmith and Cooper formed Lorimer, and later continued working together in the Leeds band the Terminals. The band released a single in December 2006, entitled "Dictator", on Double Dragon Records. The band changed their name again to Cyanide Pills and by 2011 had released five singles and one album on Damaged Goods Records. Naysmith and Cooper worked on a new project of atmospheric instrumental music under the name The Program. Naysmith soon formed the X-Rays Eyes alongside Cooper's bandmate Sy Shields. Naysmith died on 4 April 2024.

Barham has gone on to record melodic electronica under the name Kuchen. She has released two albums on the Karaoke Kalk label: Kids with Sticks in 2001 and the collaboration Kuchen Meets Mapstation in 2003 with Stefan Schneider of To Rococo Rot (who also records as Mapstation).

Horner is a film producer based in Newcastle upon Tyne.

Browne went on to play with Warm Jets, Rialto, and White Hotel (with Jean-Marc Butty, longtime drummer for PJ Harvey) before briefly returning to Canada in 2001, then relocating to San Francisco in 2002. There she played with local rock noir chanteuse Rykarda Parasol, appearing on her Here She Comes EP and the Our Hearts First Meet album, then went on to record and tour with The Wronglers, an old-time band with Warren Hellman, founder and financer of San Francisco's free Hardly Strictly Bluegrass festival, who also made an album with Jimmie Dale Gilmore called "Heirloom Music".

== Members ==
- Graeme Naysmith – guitar (1987–1996; died 2024)
- Chris Cooper – drums, percussion (1987–1996)
- Ian Masters – vocals, bass (1987–1993)
- Ashley Horner – guitar (1989)
- Meriel Barham – vocals, guitar (1990–1995)
- Colleen Browne – bass, vocals (1993–1995)

== Discography ==
=== Studio albums ===
- The Comforts of Madness (February 1990) UK No. 40
- In Ribbons (March 1992) UK No. 61
- Slow Buildings (August 1994) US CMJ No. 25

=== Compilation albums ===
- Mrs. Dolphin (10 January 1991), Japanese release containing Barging Into the Presence of God and the Half-Life EPs with the tracks "Colours and Shapes" and "A Deeper Sleep for Steven"

=== Singles/EPs/demos ===
- "Children Break" (1988)
- Barging Into the Presence of God EP (September 1989) UK Indie No. 3 UK No. 135
- Half-Life EP (October 1990), 12" contains a bonus spoken-word track "Colour of the Sky" UK No. 86
- "Kinky Love" (1991) (12" issued as Flesh Balloon EP) (June 1991) UK No. 72
- "Porpoise" (1991)
- "Throwing Back the Apple" (May 1992) UK No. 93
- Fine Friend EP (August 1994)
- "Fine Friend" (1994), US promo including "One Blue Hill" live acoustic @ KCRW
- "Angel (Will You Be My)" (1995), US promo

=== Videos ===
- "Time Thief" (1990)
- "Half-Life, Remembered" (1990)
- "Kinky Love" (1991)
- "Blue Flower" (1992)
- "Throwing Back the Apple" (1992)
- "Fine Friend" (1994)
- "Angel (Will You Be My)" (1994)
- "Sight of You" (2020)

=== Compilation albums with various artists ===
- What Feet – "Wasting My Time" (1988)
- Diamonds and Porcupines – "She Rides the Waves" (1988, demo version)
- Gigantic! 2 – "A Deeper Sleep for Steven" (1990)
- Indie Top 20 Vol. VIII – "Sight of You" (1990)
- Music for the 90's: Vol. 2 – "Time Thief" (1990, edit)
- Peel Session – "Time Thief" (1990)
- Indie Top 20 Vol XI – "Half-Life, Remembered" (1991)
- Knowing Where it All Leeds – "Two Sick Sisters" (1991)
- ...and dog bones, too – "Neverending Night" (1992)
- Lilliput – "Throwing Back the Apple", "Featherframe", "A Thousand Stars Burst Open" (1992, Tintwhistle Brass Band version)
- Precious – "Kinky Love" (1992)
- 4AD Presents The 13 Year Itch – "One Blue Hill" (1993, demo)
- All Virgos Are Mad – "Fine Friend" (1994)
- No Balls – "One Blue Hill" (1995)
- Step Right Up: The Songs of Tom Waits – "Jersey Girl" (1995)
- Joyride – "A Thousand Stars Burst Open" (1997)
- Dr. Martens Shoe Pie – "1000 Stars Burst Open" (1997)
- 1980 Forward – "Sight of You" (2005)
