= Ian Masters (songwriter) =

- Born: 4 January 1964 (age 62); Potters Bar, Hertfordshire, England
- Genres: Shoegaze, dream pop, indie pop, experimental rock
- Years active: 1987–present
- Labels: 4AD, Guernica, Friendly Science Enregisterments

Ian Masters (born 4 January 1964) is a multi-instrumentalist/songwriter/producer.

He is best known for being a founding member of the English indie pop band Pale Saints. Masters was their vocalist/bassist from their formation in 1987 until his departure from the group in 1992. Since then, he has gone on to perform in other notable groups including Spoonfed Hybrid, ESP Summer, and Friendly Science Orchestra.

== Biography ==
Masters was born in Potters Bar, Hertfordshire.

During Masters' tenure with Pale Saints, the group released The Comforts of Madness and In Ribbons as well as several EPs. The recordings featured a mix of Masters' choirboy-like vocals with dark atmospheric and noisy pop tunes. Masters, who wasn't interested in touring, left the group to pursue more experimental material.

His first project after Pale Saints was Spoonfed Hybrid with Chris Trout. They released their self-titled debut album in 1993, and their second album, Hibernation Shock was in 1996.

In 1994, Masters teamed up with His Name Is Alive auteur Warren Defever and they began to release music as ESP Summer.

In the autumn of 1998, he released the Miniature Album 7" as Friendly Science Orchestra, which became an NME 'Single of the Week'. Under this moniker, Masters covered "Because of You" on Sing a Song for You: Tribute to Tim Buckley, which was released on Manifesto Records in 2000.

In 2000, Masters teamed up with The Montgolfier Brothers' songwriter Mark Tranmer to form Wing Disk. Their first EP, Time is running out, which was recorded between Manchester, London, and Osaka saw release in 2002.

Since 2005, Masters has been living in Japan. In 2007, Masters co-wrote, sang, played the saw and Kaoss Pad on the song "Silver Kiss" on Luminous Orange's Sakura Swirl LP.

In 2008, Masters contributed vocals to a song "Hoko Onchi" on digitally-released Mid/Air by Dive Index, a musical project originated by composer/producer Will Thomas.

In 2009, his project (with David Rothon) Sore & Steal released their debut album. Masters is credited with saw and effects.

In 2016, he partnered with Terao Terako to form the experimental duo Big Beautiful Bluebottle, making what Masters described as "confusion jazz."

In 2018, he released a Wing Disk/Cucumber Concubine split single 7" with The Montgolfier Brothers' songwriter Mark Tranmer.

In 2019, he teamed up with Australian electronica musician Tim Koch to form Isolated Gate. In 2020, they released 2 EPs "T.L.C." and "Horologium Demos E.P." available on Bandcamp and as a limited edition toy lathe cut. In 2022 they released their first E.P. on Darla, "Hapax Legomenon". In 2022 they will release the E.P. "No Heart No Home" and their debut LP in early 2023.

In 2020, Masters and Warren Defever regrouped across continents as ESP Summer to release a mini-LP comprising a cover-version of The 13 Floor Elevators' Kingdom of Heaven in several phases of sonic degradation.
