= Stars on E.S.P. =

Studio album by His Name Is Alive
- Released: June 24, 1996
- Recorded: 1992–1995
- Genre: Alternative rock
- Length: 44:11; 58:33 (1998 reissue)
- Label: 4AD
- Producer: Warren Defever

His Name Is Alive chronology
King of Sweet (1993)	Stars on E.S.P. (1996)	Nice Day EP (1997)

Singles from Stars on E.S.P.
- 1. "Universal Frequencies" Released: May 28, 1996; 2. "Bad Luck Girl (Country Girl)" Released: 1997

Professional ratings
Review scores
Source	Rating
AllMusic	4/5 stars
Entertainment Weekly	A
NME	7/10
Pitchfork	7.1/10
Spin	7/10
The Village Voice	A−

Stars on E.S.P. is an album by His Name Is Alive, released by 4AD in 1996.

== Background ==
Stars on E.S.P. had the longest gestation period of any His Name Is Alive album, a project that band leader Warren Defever spent three years crafting before it saw release. In his notes written at the time of the album's release, he mentions that he began work on "I Can't Live in This World Anymore" in December 1992, right after the completion of Mouth by Mouth. The project took so long for a few reasons: HNIA's 1993 tour in support of Mouth by Mouth; the death of Defever's mother in 1994, which led his father to move to Florida, leaving the house to Defever and him living alone for the first time; and various other projects that were started but mostly left uncompleted. The album finally saw release in July 1996 on 4AD, both by their native UK branch and their USA wing, which was distributed by Warner Bros. Records at the time.

This was the first album to feature Lovetta Pippen, who became the band's primary vocalist in the late 1990s and early 2000s. She sings as part of a gospel choir on the song "Last One."

"Universal Frequencies" is highly reminiscent of The Beach Boys' "Good Vibrations". In interviews, Defever has called the song a "sequel" to "Good Vibrations".

== Track listing ==
All songs are written by Defever, credited as His Name Is Alive, except for: "The Bees," co-written by Erika Hoffman; "Universal Frequencies" and "The Sand That Holds The Lakes In Place," co-written by Matthew Smith; "Across The Street," co-written by Mark Kozelek; and "Movie," written by drummer Trey Many.

1. "Dub Love Letter"
2. "This World Is Not My Home"
3. "Bad Luck Girl"
4. "What Are You Wearing Tomorrow"
5. "The Bees"
6. "What Else Is New List"
7. "Wall of Speed"
8. "Universal Frequencies"
9. "The Sand That Holds the Lakes in Place"
10. "I Can't Live in This World Anymore"
11. "Answer to Rainbow at Midnight"
12. "Famous Goodbye King"
13. "Across the Street"
14. "Movie"
15. "Last One"
  - 4AD's 1998 reissue contains the tracks from the 1997 Nice Day EP:
16. "Drive Around the Clock"
17. "Crashed Up on the Corner"
18. "Soul Resides in the Horse Barn"
19. "Whale You Ease My Mind"
20. "Oh Sinner Man"

For the first time in His Name Is Alive's history, the 4AD UK release (CAD6010CD) and the American CD release were the same. See entries for earlier albums for the differences in UK and USA releases. As noted above, the 1998 reissue on 4AD (worldwide, and not distributed by Warner Bros. in the USA) contains the tracks from the 1997 Nice Day EP. This version has the catalog number GAD6010CD

=== 4AD vinyl release (CAD6010) ===
The cover for the rare 4AD mono vinyl LP version Stars on ESP.

4AD's vinyl LP release of Stars on ESP, a limited edition, featured a special mono remix of the album, further emphasizing the album's tribute to the past glory days of AM radio (which is always broadcast in mono). A different cover featuring oven mitts was used. The LP features tracks 1 through 8 on side one, and 9 through 15 on side two.

=== Warner Bros. 1996 promo release ===
The cover for the rare Warner Brothers promotional release of Stars on ESP.

During the years that Warner Bros. distributed 4AD's releases in the US, they used their own catalog numbers that did not correspond with the standard 4AD numbering scheme (one can tell whether a release is an LP, EP, etc., and what year it came out by looking at a 4AD catalog number). Nonetheless, the front and back cover CD artwork for the Warner Bros. release did use the CAD6010.01, CAD6010.02, etc., designations as mentioned above, even though the Warners' catalog number was different. However, a special promotional release with a different cover re-did this scheme with the Warner Bros. catalog number (46207).
