= His Name Is Alive =

American rock band

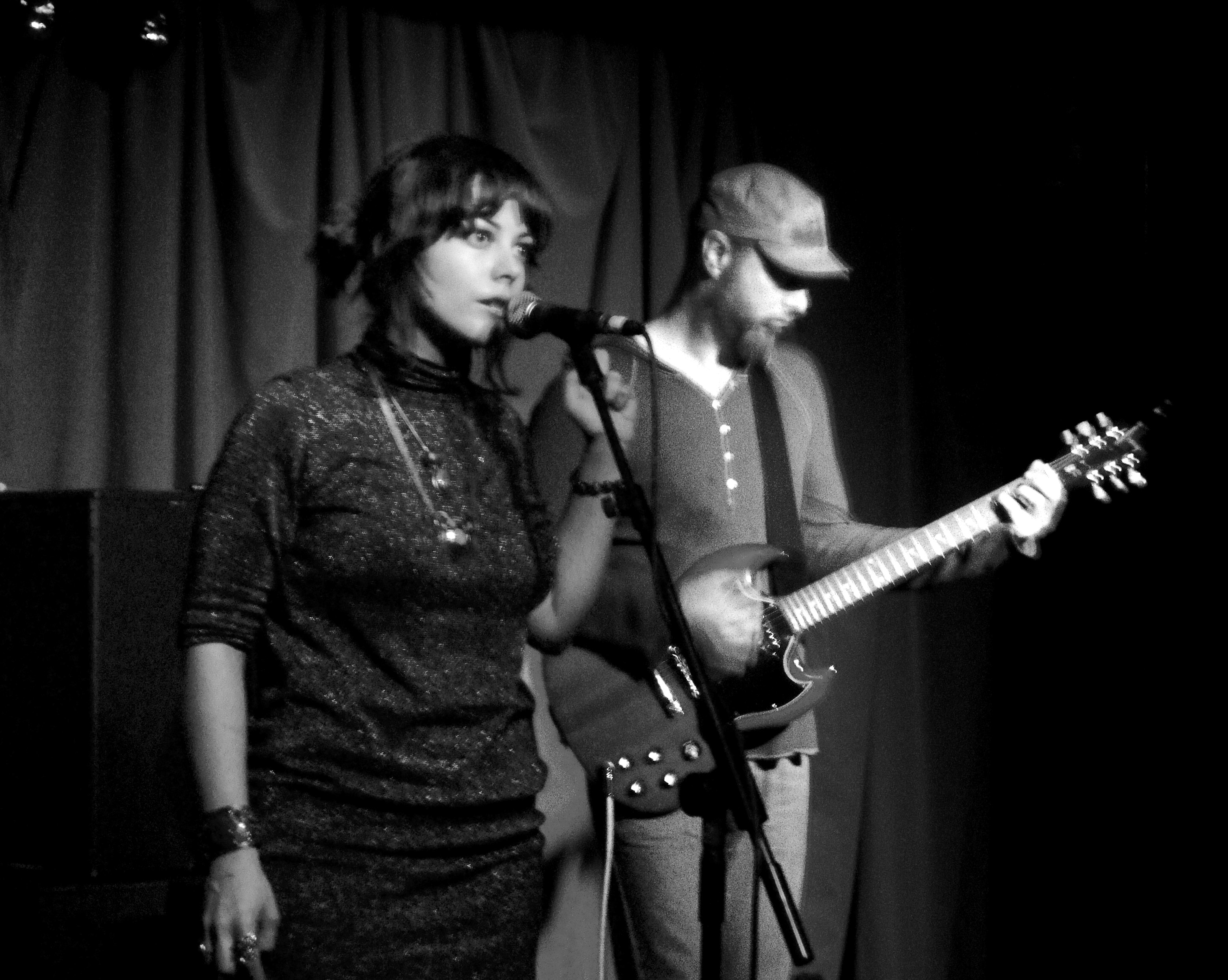
- His Name Is Alive performing in 2005

Background information
- Origin: Livonia, Michigan, U.S.
- Genres: Experimental rock, dream pop
- Years active: 1985–present
- Labels: Silver Mountain Media; 4AD; Ryko; Sony; High Two; Kill Rock Stars; Warner Bros.
- Members: Warren Defever; Andrea Morici; Dusty Jones; J. Rowe
- Website: hisnameisalive.com

His Name Is Alive is an American experimental rock band/project from Livonia, Michigan. After several self-released cassettes, they debuted on 4AD Records in 1990, starting a long run at the label. Throughout the band's long history, leader Warren Defever has been the only constant member, with a variety of musicians and singers contributing over the years.

== Biography ==
Defever began recording in his basement in 1985, while still in high school. His initial work consisted primarily of Defever alone recording the music to a 4-track recorder, with friend Angie Carozzo providing vocals. After Defever went off to college and met Karin Oliver, she became the band's primary vocalist.

The group's work resulted in a self-released cassette. Defever sent the tape to 4AD in hopes of being signed to the label. Despite label president Ivo Watts-Russell's rejection of the band, Defever continued to send him tapes, with improved versions of the songs appearing on each new tape. Ivo signed the band in 1989, believing that (along with his This Mortal Coil partner John Fryer) he could re-mix the songs into a proper album 4AD could release. Livonia appeared in the summer of 1990, and became one of the label's biggest sellers of the year. "He took it apart, and he didn't put it back together," Defever would later comment on Ivo's production style.

A second album of songs similarly recorded in Defever's home studio (which he later dubbed Time Stereo) and remixed in England by Ivo and Fryer, Home Is In Your Head, appeared in 1991. Over most of the rest of the 1990s, Defever improved Time Stereo to record more professionally, and the band became a favorite of 4AD's devoted fanbase.

In 1993, HNIA released Mouth by Mouth, their third full length for 4AD, and embarked on their first full North American tour with Defever on guitar, Karin Oliver on vocals, and Trey Many on drums. This album and tour showed a different side of HNIA to their fans, marking the first time Defever had full control of the mixing and assembly of a HNIA release. Mouth by Mouth was a more ambitious noisy pop record that lacked some of the earlier sparse gothic sounds people came to expect from the first two releases. Defever's wide musical taste became more apparent as Mouth by Mouth showcased his love for obscure '60s pop, reggae, Japanese noise and free jazz.

Defever then took an extended break to work on new projects and write songs for 1996's Stars On ESP, an ambitious project three years in the making. He continued to collaborate with Karin Oliver and Trey Many on this release but also wrote songs with Matthew Smith of Outrageous Cherry, Mark Kozelek of Red House Painters, Ian Masters of Pale Saints, and Erika Hoffman. Stars on ESP was a breakthrough for the band as Defever began to fully realize his potential as a musician able to paste many influences together in one cohesive work "On their fourth album for 4AD, Stars on ESP, the group mixes dub, dream pop, surf, country, and Pet Sounds-era Beach Boys into something altogether unique."

In 1991 and 1993, 4AD commissioned videos from British animators the Brothers Quay. The brothers Stephen and Timothy were allowed to choose which songs they would like to create videos or short films for. They choose the songs "Are We Still Married?" and "Can't Go Wrong Without You".

1998 was a year of big change for 4AD and HNIA, as Ivo sold the label to Beggars Banquet, resulting in major changes in the label. The band signed a more traditional contract with the label, bringing with it increased commercial expectations. When 1998's Ft. Lake failed to meet those expectations, most of the band left for full-time jobs or more commercially successful endeavors. Stripped down to Defever and vocalist Lovetta Pippen (an experienced soul and gospel singer before joining HNIA after appearing as part of a gospel choir on Stars On ESP), the duo released two soul and R&B-influenced albums in 2001 and 2002, alienating much of the band's fanbase. After having sold a respectable (but far from commercially successful) 100,000 albums for 4AD from 1990 through 2002, the band was dropped by the label, leaving the band's future in doubt.

Defever kept the band's name alive through several notable appearances on compilations like Kill Rock Stars' Tracks and Fields, and We Could Live in Hope, the Low tribute album. Several full-length releases on the Time Stereo label were mostly instrumental music, live recordings, and a few new experimental recordings. In 2005, Defever co-founded the Silver Mountain Media label, and secured distribution for HNIA with major label Sony-BMG. 2006's Detrola was the first full-length release on the label, and was met with much acclaim, winning back many of the old fans from the 4AD days, and earning success on college rock radio and modern rock charts. Detrola primarily features newly discovered Andy FM on vocals, although Lovetta Pippen and Erika Hoffmann make guest appearances as well. Andy FM was best known as the keyboardist for Detroit underground favorites the Tranzistors and Sonapanic. In interviews Defever has often described her as "the best singer ever to sing me Elvis songs and Patsy Cline songs at my birthday party. She plays an important role in HNIA, she's a great singer and she's not afraid when the trombonist takes off his pants and pees in his trombone."

The follow-up to Detrola, titled Xmmer, was released on September 18, 2007. Sweet Earth Flower, the band's tribute to free jazz saxophonist Marion Brown was released by High Two on November 6, 2007.

In May 2010, His Name is Alive released their 11th full-length album The Eclipse. The album was one of the ten CDs released in the limited edition box set also entitled The Eclipse. It features Warn Defever and vocalist Andy FM. Other contributors include Steve Sparks on drums and Jean Cook playing violin. The album was released for MP3 download, FLAC, and CD through the Silver Mountain Media store.

In May 2011, His Name is Alive embarked on a "20th anniversary" series of shows which included a community bike ride in Detroit. Defever says 2011 marks the 20th anniversary of His Name is Alive even though the group's first record was released in 1990. Defever says one undisclosed year has been blacked out of the band's chronology for reasons he will not discuss.

== Discography ==
=== Main albums ===
- Livonia (1990) (4AD)
- Home Is in Your Head (1991) (4AD)
- Mouth by Mouth (1993) (4AD)
- Stars on E.S.P. (1996) (4AD)
- Ft. Lake (1998) (4AD)
- Someday My Blues Will Cover the Earth (2001) (4AD)
- Last Night (2002) (4AD)
- Detrola (2006) (Silver Mountain/Sony BMG)
- XMMER (2007) (Silver Mountain/Sony BMG)
- Sweet Earth Flower (2007) (High Two)
- The Eclipse (2010) (Silver Mountain Media)
- Silver Family (2012) (Silver Mountain Media)
- Silver Dragon (2012) (Silver Mountain Media)
- Tecuciztecatl (2014) (London London)
- Patterns of Light (2016) (London London/Silver Mountain Media)
- Black Wings (2017) (Silver Mountain Media/HHBTM Records)
- All The Mirrors In The House (2019) (Disciples)
- Return To Never (2020) (Disciples)
- Tanpura and Harmonium (2020) (no label)

=== Singles and EPs ===
- The Dirt Eaters EP (1992) (4AD)
- In Every Ford EP (1993) (4AD) promotional CD
- Universal Frequencies EP (1996) (4AD)
- Nice Day EP (1997) (4AD)
- Melody Farm EP [split with Little Princess] (1997) (Shaolin Temple / timeSTEREO)
- Pets Farm EP [split with Little Princess] (1997) (Motorway/ timeSTEREO)
- Drugs Farm EP [split with Little Princess] (1998) (Rocket Science / timeSTEREO)
- Woodstock/Mothers Day 7" included with LP of Fort Lake(1998) (4AD)
- Can't Always Be Loved (1998) (4AD)
- Happy Blues / One Year (2001) (4AD)
- Nothing Special (2001) (4AD)
- Raindrops Rainbow EP (2005) (Silver Mountain Media)
- Silver Makeup EP (2007) (Silver Mountain Media)
- Firefly Dragonfly (2007) (Acuarela Discos)
- Dream Rememberer (2010) (Silver Mountain Media)

=== Independent projects, compilations and remixes ===
- Sings Man on the Silver Mountain and 8 Other Songs (1992) (Rykodisc)
- King of Sweet (1993) (Perdition Plastics, reissued in 2005 via timeSTEREO as MP3)
- Sampler (1993) (4AD)
- Radio LP (1998) (timeSTEREO)
- Always Stay Sweet (1999) (4AD)
- Emergency (2000) (timeSTEREO)
- When the Stars Refuse to Shine (2000) (timeSTEREO)
- Early Music Volume 1 (1985-1989) (2000) (timeSTEREO)
- RMX's 1995-2000 (2000) (timeSTEREO)
- Rare Tracks in the Snow (2000) (timeSTEREO)
- Spring Can Really Hang You Up The Most (2001) (timeSTEREO)
- Heart and Hand [10-CD box set] (2001) (timeSTEREO)
- Cloud Box [10-CD box set] (2004) (timeSTEREO)
- Brown Rice (2005) (timeSTEREO)
- Leaf Club (2005) (timeSTEREO)
- Summer Bird LP (2005) (Ypsilanti)
- Ufo Catcher (2005) (En/of)
- Someday RMX (2006) (Silver Mountain Media)
- Detrola Instrumental (2007) (Silver Mountain Media) (iTunes only purchase)
- Xmmer Instrumental (2007) (Silver Mountain Media)
- Eclipx (2010) (Silver Mountain Media)
- Dragons Look Out Your Window (2013) (Silver Mountain Media)
- Home Is (2013) (Silver Mountain Media)

=== Live ===
- Sound of Mexico (1995) (timeSTEREO)
- Finer Twilights (1997) (timeSTEREO)
- Golden City (1997) (timeSTEREO)
- Great Lake States Blues (1997) (timeSTEREO)
- Ten Years Long Time (2000) (timeSTEREO)
- In the West (2000) (timeSTEREO)
- In the East (2000) (timeSTEREO)

=== Video ===
- "Are We Still Married" (1992)
- "Can't Go Wrong Without You" (1993)
- "Peace In Detroit" (2002)
- "Come To Me" (2007)
- "Vanilia" (2010)
- "St. Michael" (2007)
- "Dream Rememberer" (2007)
