= Karin Oliver =

American singer

Karin Oliver is a former singer for the Livonia, Michigan band His Name Is Alive. She was with the band from 1989 to 1998. After leaving the band following the USA release party for the Ft. Lake album, she pursued a career in marketing full-time. She married Steven Kreft in August 2000. Karin currently runs her own small marketing consulting agency in Wisconsin.

She has also provided vocals for Velour 100, a band founded by His Name Is Alive drummer Trey Many.

The last album featuring her vocals is "Always Stay Sweet," a limited edition album released years after her parting with His Name Is Alive, which was recorded with her singing covers of songs a capella, with instrumentation added after the fact.
