= Warren Defever =

American musician

Warren Defever (first name often spelled Warn; born April 30, 1969) is a musician and producer, originally from Livonia, Michigan, and now based in Detroit. He is most known for his chameleonic project His Name Is Alive, though he is active in numerous other circles. He produced, engineered, and/or remixed recordings by Iggy and the Stooges, Easy Action, Low, Ida, Michael Hurley, Califone, Yoko Ono, Thurston Moore, the Gories, the Go, Nomo, Saturday Looks Good to Me, Ethan Daniel Davidson, Faruq Z. Bey, the Von Bondies, Reba Fritz, Destroy All Monsters, Jenny Toomey, Slumber Party, John Sinclair, Elizabeth Mitchell, and Lisa Loeb, as well as HNIA offshoot Velour 100.

Defever was raised in a strict religious household, along with his brothers, Johnny and Matt. He grew up a music fan. His grandfather was a musician from Saskatchewan and had taught Warren and his brothers how to play various musical instruments.

Defever began recording while still in high school, and toured as the bassist of psychobilly rock band Elvis Hitler.

For many years, Defever recorded in the basement of his parents' house, which he later bought from them.

Around the same time His Name Is Alive was departing from 4AD Records, Defever opened his own recording studio, Brown Rice, in the Detroit area. Along with Davin Brainard, Defever runs a home record label, timeSTEREO.

In 2007, Defever opened The UFO Factory, a new studio in Detroit. Everything inside was painted silver, including the piano.

Since 2018, Defever has worked at Third Man Records in the mastering studio in Detroit, mastering records and cutting lacquers for artists such as Jack White, The White Stripes, Bob Dylan, Elvis Presley, Sun Ra, Albert Ayer, Olivia Rodrigo, Miles Davis, Prince, Link Wray, Iggy and The Stooges, Gracie Abrams, Shabazz Palaces, Mac DeMarco and many others.
