= Ralph Jezzard =

British record producer (1966–2025)

- Born: 16 January 1966
- Origin: London, England
- Died: 24 February 2025 (aged 59)
- Occupations: Musician, music producer, writer
- Instruments: Vocals, guitar, bass guitar, keyboards, sampler

Ralph Jezzard (16 January 1966 – 24 February 2025) was an English musician and producer based in London.

== Life and career ==
Jezzard started playing in bands at the age of 14 including Case. At 16 he started working at Wickham Studios in South London as a tape operator, and the first record he engineered was a band called Blood and Roses' EP, which reached number 4 in the UK indie charts in 1983. From there he began engineering full-time in the studio working with various punk bands including Angelic Upstarts, Cock Sparrer, The Business, The Damned, Chiefs of Relief and The Sid Presley Experience.

He then moved to the Beat Farm Studios in London Bridge as the Acid House scene was emerging in Britain and worked with Rhythm King acts such as Bomb The Bass and Merlin. The combination of electronica and punk/rock music led to his first production job with EMF's worldwide hit "Unbelievable" which reached No. 1 in the US.

Ralph continued working with rock/alternative bands throughout the 1990s including The Wildhearts, Senseless Things, Claytown Troupe and Chapterhouse.

A friendship with Wildhearts drummer Ritch Battersby led to the formation of Grand Theft Audio along with Chris McCormack from 3 Colours Red and Jay Butler from Real TV. The band were soon signed to London Sire and toured extensively in Europe and the US. Their only album was called Blame Everyone and had some success with the songs "Stoopid Ass" and "We Luv U" getting inclusion on soundtracks for Dude, Where's My Car?, Hole, Driven, American Pie 2 and many more. The songs were also featured on computer games including Gran Turismo 3.

In 2003 Grand Theft Audio split up. All band members went their own way and Jezzard moved to the US where he continued production and engineering at Willie Nelson's studio in Austin. In 2005 Jezzard returned to the UK after recording Valor Del Corazon with Ginger from The Wildhearts. During this time he met his wife, Sammy Andrews.

Shortly after returning to the UK he co-produced Amy Studt's album My Paper Made Men in Eden Studios for 19 Entertainment and mixed live tracks for Simple Kid.

Ralph later wrote and produced songs with Cass Browne (Gorillaz), as well as mixing a record for UK band Fearless (Mercury Records UK).

Jezzard died on 24 February 2025, at the age of 59. In a statement released on X by EMF, he was described as "a talented musician, engineer and producer" that "played a massive part in the bands success".

== Film and television soundtracks/composing ==
- Driven
- The Hole
- Tomcats
- Dude, Where's My Car
- Joe Somebody
- Point Break

== Game soundtracks/composing ==
Gran Turismo 3 FIFA 2001 Urban Chaos Sammy Sosa Baseball Shaun Palmers Pro Snowboarding The Hulk

| Artist | Single/Album | Label | Year | Chart Position UK | Chart Position US |
|---|---|---|---|---|---|
| EMF | Unbelievable | Parlophone | | | |
| EMF | Schubert Dip | Parlophone | | | |
| EMF | Children | Parlophone | | | |
| EMF | Lies | Parlophone | | | |
| EMF | Stigma | Parlophone | | | |
| Simple Kid | Live At The Scala | Country Gentleman | | | |
| Bushwick Bill | Play Pussy Get Fucked | CKFB | | | |
| Grand Theft Audio | Blame Everyone | London/Sire | | | |
| The Wildhearts | Endless Nameless | Mushroom | | | |
| Senseless Things | The First of Too Many | Epic | | | |
| Senseless Things | Empire of the Senseless | Epic | | | |
| Amy Studt | TBC | 19 Entertainment | | | |
| 3 Colours Red | Live 2006 | Creation | | | |
| Ginger | Valor Del Corazon | Round Records | | | |
| Fatima Mansions | Viva Dead Ponies | Radioactive | | | |
| Chapterhouse | Whirlpool | Dedicated | | | |
| Chapterhouse | Blood Music | Dedicated | | | |
| The Godfathers | The Godfathers | Epic | | | |
| Terrorvision | Blackbird | EMI | | | |
| Blaggers ITA | Bad Karma | Parlophone | | | |
| Westworld | Movers and Shakers | Savage | | | |
| Back To The Planet | Teenage Turtles | London | | | |
| Claytown Troupe | Hey Lord | Island | | | |
| Powder | MCMXV | Mercury | | | |
| Sid Presley Experience | Cold Turkey | ID | | | |
| Keith Flint | Rock N Roll Nigger | XL | | | |
| Cock Sparrer | Shock Troupes | Link | | | |
