= The Best of Chapterhouse =

Greatest hits album by Chapterhouse
- Released: 7 May 2007
- Recorded: 1990–1993
- Genres: Dream pop Shoegaze
- Length: 68:02
- Label: Sony BMG

Chapterhouse chronology
Blood Music (1993)	The Best of Chapterhouse (2007)	Chronology (2023)

Professional ratings
Review scores
Source	Rating
AllMusic	4/5 stars
russ.fm	77/100

The Best of Chapterhouse is a greatest hits compilation album by English shoegazing band Chapterhouse released in 2007 on CD. The inner sleeve features a brief history of Chapterhouse written by Michael Heatley.

== Track listing ==
1. "We Are the Beautiful" (from Blood Music) – 4:15
2. "Falling Down" (from Whirlpool) – 3:57
3. "Pearl" (from Whirlpool) – 5:16
4. "Mesmerise" (from Mesmerise) – 4:14
5. "Autosleeper" (from Whirlpool) – 4:49
6. "Come Heaven" (from Whirlpool 2006 Reissue) – 5:33
7. "Breather" (from Whirlpool) – 4:20
8. "She's a Vision" (from Blood Music) – 4:12
9. "There's Still Life" (from Blood Music) – 5:03
10. "Love Forever" (from Blood Music) – 6:00
11. "Then We'll Rise" (from Mesmerise) – 4:15
12. "In My Arms" (from Whirlpool 2006 Reissue) – 4:41
13. "Ecstasy II" – 3:51
14. "Something More" (from Whirlpool) – 3:19
15. "On the Way to Fly" (from Blood Music) – 4:25
