= ...XYZ (Moose album) =

Studio album by Moose
- Released: September 1992
- Studio: Protocol Studios (London); Townhouse (London)
- Genre: Jangle pop; indie rock; dream pop; shoegaze
- Length: 51:00 (1:19 with bonus tracks)
- Label: Hut Records
- Producer: Mitch Easter

...XYZ is the debut studio album by British indie rock band Moose, released in 1992 by Hut Records.

== Background ==
After their first three 1991 shoegaze-style EPs (Jack, Cool Breeze, Reprise), Moose aimed to avoid repeating themselves and explore a new direction on their debut album. Produced by Mitch Easter, known for his work with R.E.M., ...XYZ featured a noticeable country influence. According to guitarist Kevin McKillop, Easter introduced this element to the band, though he was also surprised by their appreciation for artists such as Willie Nelson, Merle Haggard, and George Jones when they exchanged their musical tastes. Russell Yates likewise noted the presence of country and western influences throughout ...XYZ, both in its lyrics and melodies.

The album's production employed violins, harmonica, keyboards, and acoustic guitars, and according to the band, twelve songs were recorded without prior rehearsals. ...XYZ also features guest vocals from Dolores O'Riordan of the Cranberries on the track "Soon Is Never Soon Enough."

== Release ==
Despite its critical acclaim, ...XYZ failed to achieve commercial success. Hut Records dropped the band soon after its parent label, Virgin Records, was bought by EMI In 2009, Cherry Red released a remastered edition of the album, adding bonus tracks from the 1991 compilation EP Sonny & Sam.

== Sources ==
- Provis, Victor (19 April 2018). Shoegaze: My Bloody Valentine, Slowdive, Ride Etc (in French) (EPUB ed.). Le mot et le reste. ISBN 9782360545285.
