= Human (The Human League song) =

1986 single by the Human League

Single by the Human League

from the album Crash
- Released: 11 August 1986
- Recorded: February 1986
- Studio: Flyte Time (Minneapolis, Minnesota)
- Genre: Pop soul; dance
- Length: 4:24 (album version); 3:48 (single "fade-out" version)
- Label: Virgin
- Songwriters: James Harris III; Terry Lewis
- Producer: Jimmy Jam and Terry Lewis

The Human League singles chronology
"Louise" (1984)	"Human" (1986)	"I Need Your Loving" (1986)

Audio sample
- file; help

"Human" is a song by the British synth-pop band the Human League, released as the lead single from their fifth studio album, Crash (1986). The track, which deals with the subject of infidelity, was written and produced by Jimmy Jam and Terry Lewis. "Human" peaked at number eight on the UK singles chart. Outside the United Kingdom, "Human" topped the charts in Canada and the United States and peaked within the top ten of the charts in Ireland, New Zealand, South Africa and West Germany.

== Background and composition ==
In 1985, recording for the Human League's fifth album was not going well. The band did not like the results, which caused internal conflict. Virgin Records executives, worried by the lack of progress from their at-the-time most profitable signing, suggested the band accept an offer to work with producers Jimmy Jam and Terry Lewis, who had material to work with and had expressed an interest in the band from their U.S. releases. Jam and Lewis had recently emerged as in-demand talent owing to their success with Janet Jackson and her Control album.

Of the ten songs on Crash, Jam and Lewis wrote three, "Human" being one. A mid-tempo ballad, it is lyrically an exchange between a man and a woman who have reunited after a separation. In the first two verses, Philip Oakey apologises to his partner for being unfaithful during her absence. In the breakdown, Joanne Catherall's spoken-word confession reveals that she too was unfaithful. The song's title is derived from the chorus, in which both parties in the relationship explain that they are "only human" and "born to make mistakes". The song is a composition in common time with a tempo of 102 beats per minute.

"'Human' is probably the best vocal that I ever did, but it took a month to record," Oakey recalled. "A really big influence on doing those monologues was Gary Numan, particularly 'Are "Friends" Electric?', which has two different spoken bits, and he pulls it off."

"Human" became the second million-selling number one for the Human League on the U.S. Billboard Hot 100 (after "Don't You Want Me") and their second chart-topper on the U.S. Hot Dance Club Play chart (after "(Keep Feeling) Fascination"). Jam and Lewis' R&B-based production was also popular on American urban radio, bringing the Human League into the top ten of the U.S. R&B chart for the first time. The song reached number one in Canada, giving the band their second and last number one there, and peaked at number eight in the UK.

== Critical reception ==
On its release, "Human" met with mixed reviews. In Smash Hits, Simon Mills described it as a "perfect pop record" that is let down by Oakey's "fragile and unconfident" vocal. Billboard wrote: "Trio that helped define British techno-pop has lost its do-it-yourself edge but gained Jam and Lewis; resulting dance ballad is lush, plush, even soulful." However, John Leland of Spin criticised the record, saying: "The Human League tackle the schmaltzy pop soul ballad and emerge with no idea how silly they look." He added: "'Human', a whiny claim to sensitivity, undercuts the band's essential irony; the joke about Human League was that they weren't human but digital chips. And besides, this embarrassing confession is an unbearably weak defense of infidelity."

AllMusic journalist Dave Thompson retrospectively described "Human" as a "lovely romantic ballad. The lyrics make much of human mistakes and the need for human forgiveness in a thoroughly romantic context." Erstwhile Human League producer Martin Rushent – who helmed the platinum-selling Dare (1981) and Love and Dancing (1982) albums – disapproved of the track, lamenting that it "just wasn't what [he] imagined the future for the Human League ought to have been."

== Remixes ==
The song was covered as "Human (The Five Remix)" by British boyband Five for their self titled debut album released in 1998. The song was revived and remixed by U.S. producers Joel Dickinson and John Michael in 2010. This new club remix incorporated elements from Coldplay's hit "Viva la Vida". It was a favourite among NYC DJs including Junior Vasquez.

=== Chinese Whispers mix ===
"Human" was reworked and re-released in 2003 as a remix in the form of "The Chinese Whispers Mix", principally in Chinese territories. It was the creation of Hong Kong based British producer Ian Widgery who had recently had major success in the Chinese music market with the album Shanghai Lounge Divas. Widgery took the original, mixed in traditional Chinese instruments and recorded a new chorus in Mandarin by female Chinese vocalist Li Ya, which is interwoven with Oakey, Catherall and Sulley's vocals. Oakey's lead vocals are faded to give the music greater impact.

The remix was so popular that it crossed over to the UK and U.S. markets where it received radio airplay and play on music television stations during the height of the electroclash revival. Although it was not released as a single in either country, it appears on some versions of the band's The Very Best of the Human League album of 2003.

== Music video ==
Screenshot of promotional video for "Human" 1986

The music video for "Human" (which uses the shorter single version) was filmed in London during June 1986, in a studio using chroma key overlay. It is heavily stylised to give a "water reflective" effect and blue hue throughout. In the first time that the band had been presented as a "Phil and the girls" trio, images of Oakey, Catherall and Sulley are constantly layered and blended. The video was conceived and directed by Andy Morahan.

In 2003, a new video was created and released to promote the Chinese Whispers mix. This music video used the original footage of Oakey, Sulley and Catherall from 1986 and interlaced it with traditional Chinese imagery of silhouetted water grass, water lilies and Chinese characters. It was subject of a U.S. MTV featurette which was introduced by Oakey and featured Ian Widgery talking about the creative process in the reworking of the original "Human".

== Track listings ==
- 7-inch single (Virgin VS880)

A. "Human" – 3:45
B. "Human" (instrumental) – 3:45

- 12-inch single (Virgin VS880-12)

A. "Human" (extended version) – 5:00
B1. "Human" (acapella) – 2:00
B2. "Human" (instrumental) – 5:00

== Charts ==
=== Weekly charts ===
Weekly chart performance for "Human"
Chart (1986)	Peak position
Australia (Kent Music Report)	26
Belgium (Ultratop 50 Flanders)	11
Canada Top Singles (RPM)	1
Canada Adult Contemporary (RPM)	6
Europe (European Hot 100 Singles)	10
Finland (Suomen virallinen lista)	15
Ireland (IRMA)	5
Italy (Musica e dischi)	12
Netherlands (Dutch Top 40)	13
Netherlands (Single Top 100)	16
New Zealand (Recorded Music NZ)	4
South Africa (Springbok Radio)	9
Switzerland (Schweizer Hitparade)	25
UK Singles (Official Charts)	8
US Billboard Hot 100	1
US Adult Contemporary (Billboard)	3
US Dance Club Songs (Billboard)	1
US Hot R&B/Hip-Hop Songs (Billboard)	3
US Cash Box Top 100	1
US Top Black Contemporary Singles (Cash Box)	5
West Germany (GfK)	5

=== Year-end charts ===
Year-end chart performance for "Human"
Chart (1986)	Position
Belgium (Ultratop 50 Flanders)	85
Canada Top Singles (RPM)	28
Europe (European Hot 100 Singles)	88
Netherlands (Single Top 100)	85
US Billboard Hot 100	25
US Cash Box Top 100	7
West Germany (Media Control)	62

== Certifications ==
Certifications for "Human"
Region	Certification	Certified units/sales
New Zealand (RMNZ)	Gold	15,000^{‡}
^{‡} Sales+streaming figures based on certification alone.

== Legacy ==
Robert Smith of the Cure cited the song as an influence for their 1992 album, Wish. "For every album we do, I assemble a bunch of songs that have something that I'm trying to capture. For Wish, I would listen to 'Mesmerise' by Chapterhouse for its feeling of abandon and 'Human' by The Human League. You couldn't spot anything sonically or structurally that would influence anything we did, but there's an indefinable something that I'm trying to capture", Smith said in 1993.

A parody of the song was performed by Gloria Estefan on The Rosie O'Donnell Show in 1998, under the title "Cuban".

Rick Springfield released a cover of the song on The Day After Yesterday (2005).
