= Mesmerise (song) =

Single by Chapterhouse
- B-side: "Precious One"; "Summer Chill"; "Then We'll Rise"
- Released: 1991
- Genre: Dream pop, shoegazing, alternative dance
- Length: 4:52
- Label: Dedicated
- Songwriters: Russell Barrett, Andrew Sherriff, John Barry, Don Black

Chapterhouse singles chronology
"Pearl" (1991)	"Mesmerise" (1991)	"Don't Look Now" (1992)

"Mesmerise" is a single by English shoegaze band Chapterhouse released in 1991. It appeared in the charts for 2 weeks, entering and peaking at 60. A non-album single, it was included on the band's compilation album The Best of Chapterhouse.

Robert Smith of The Cure cited the song as an influence on their 1992 album, Wish. "For every album we do, I assemble a bunch of songs that have something that I'm trying to capture. For Wish, I would listen to "Mesmerise" by Chapterhouse for its feeling of abandon and "Human" by The Human League. You couldn't spot anything sonically or structurally that would influence anything we did, but there's an indefinable something that I'm trying to capture. One night I must have played "Mesmerise" 20 times, drinking and turning it louder and louder, putting myself into a trance" Smith said in 1993.

== Track listing ==
=== CD and 12" ===
1. "Mesmerise"
2. "Precious One"
3. "Summer Chill"
4. "Then We'll Rise"

== Charts ==
Chart (1991–92)	Peak position
UK Singles (OCC)	60
US Alternative Airplay (Billboard)	21
