= Bad Karma (Blaggers ITA album) =

Studio album by Blaggers ITA
- Released: 1994
- Recorded: 1993–1994
- Genres: Punk rock, rapcore, alternative rock
- Length: 46:54
- Label: Parlophone
- Producers: Ralph Jezzard, John Waddell

Blaggers ITA chronology
United Colors of Blaggers ITA (1993)	Bad Karma (1994)

Bad Karma is the second full-length studio album by British punk rock band Blaggers ITA, released in 1994 by Parlophone Records, a subsidiary of EMI. Known for their politically charged lyrics and fusion of punk, rapcore, and alternative rock, the album marked the band's brief foray into mainstream music under a major label.

== Background ==
Blaggers ITA, originally formed as The Blaggers in 1988, were known for their anti-fascist stance and left-wing activism. By the early 1990s, they had evolved musically, incorporating elements of hip hop, electronic dance music, and brass instrumentation. Bad Karma followed their 1993 album United Colors of Blaggers ITA, and was their only album release under Parlophone before being dropped by the label.

== Recording and production ==
The album was produced primarily by Ralph Jezzard, with John Waddell contributing to the final track. It features a mix of aggressive punk energy and rap-infused vocals, with trumpet and sampling adding to its eclectic sound. The band used the album's promotional budget to support political causes, including anti-fascist campaigns.

== Reception ==
Professional ratings
Review scores
Source	Rating
The Great Indie Discography	5/10 stars
New Musical Express	7/10 stars
The Encyclopedia of Popular Music	2/5 stars
Kerrang!	4/5 stars
Drowned In Sound	9/10 stars

A review in Kerrang! magazine stated "Bad Karma is one of the best British Rock albums of 1994".

A New Musical Express review said that the group "...have sussed that the best way to convert a generation of floppy, apathetic indie fans into useful participants against fascism is to stick a whopping tune behind the message..."

Reflecting on the album in 2001, a writer for Drowned in Sound felt that:

"Every song here is like a rallying cry to some failed and forgotten revolution [...] – a call to arms, a call against apathy and injustice in a world that then, as now, is selling millions of records that placate rather than agitate [...] this is a wake up call. Records like this burn with a passion Travis, the Sterophonics and Coldplay can only dream of."

== Track listing ==
1. "The Hits" – 4:19
2. "1994" – 4:28
3. "Mantrap" – 4:08
4. "Bad Karma" – 3:44
5. "Famine Queen" – 4:38
6. "Stresss" – 3:34
7. "Abandon Ship" – 4:52
8. "Nation" – 3:40
9. "Garden of Love" – 2:26
10. "Slam" – 3:38
11. "Hate Generator" – 3:40
12. "Oxygen" – 3:09

== Personnel ==
- Matty Blagg – lead vocals
- Paul "The Pig" – guitar
- Steve Serious – guitar
- Jason "Wrist Action Jackson" – drums
- Christie – rap
- Brendan H – trumpet
- Ralph Jezzard – producer (tracks 1–11)
- John Waddell – producer (track 12)
