= Sunburst (EP) =

EP by Chapterhouse
- Released: 5 November 1990
- Recorded: 1990
- Genre: Dream pop; shoegaze
- Length: 16:36
- Label: Dedicated Records

Chapterhouse chronology
Freefall (1990)	Sunburst (1990)	Whirlpool (1991)

Sunburst is the second EP by English shoegaze band Chapterhouse. It features in the reissue of Chapterhouse's debut album Whirlpool, released in 2006. Sunburst contains a track produced by Robin Guthrie of Cocteau Twins, as well as a cover version of The Beatles' song "Rain".

== Reception ==
Allmusic writer Ned Raggett praised Guthrie's production on "Something More", and said while the Whirlpool version of the song "is equally good, it's a pity that this one was fairly obscure in comparison". Raggett also described the verse and chorus section of "Satin Safe" as "great modern guitar psych", and that Chapterhouse's version of "Rain", while not on par with the Beatles original, is "still a fun runthrough."

== Track listing ==
1. "Something More" (Andrew Sherriff) – 3:19
2. "Satin Safe" – (Stephen Patman, Andrew Sherriff) 5:42
3. "Rain" – 3:21 (Lennon-McCartney)
4. "Feel the Same" – 4:14 (Stephen Patman, Simon Rowe)
