= United Colors of Blaggers ITA =

United Colours of Blaggers ITA

Studio album by Blaggers ITA
- Released: January 18, 1993
- Recorded: Southern Studios, London
- Genre: Punk rock, rapcore, ska, reggae, electronic
- Length: 51:14
- Label: Words of Warning
- Producer: Blaggers ITA, Harvey Birrell, Paul Harding

Blaggers ITA chronology
God Save the Cockroach (1992)	United Colours of Blaggers ITA (1993)	Bad Karma (1994)

United Colors of Blaggers ITA is the first full-length studio album by British punk band Blaggers ITA. It was released on January 18, 1993, by independent label Words of Warning and marked a stylistic shift for the band, blending punk rock with rap, ska, reggae, and electronic music.

The cover artwork was a parody of the controversial "United Colors of Benetton" fashion advertising campaign.

== Background ==
Blaggers ITA, originally known as The Blaggers, were formed in London in 1988. The band was known for its militant anti-fascist stance and left-wing politics. The "ITA" suffix stands for "In The Area", reflecting their street-level activism and musical fusion.

== Reception ==
Professional ratings
Review scores
Source	Rating
The Great Indie Discography	6/10 stars
New Musical Express	4/10 stars
The Encyclopedia of Popular Music	3/5 stars

The album was initially banned in Germany because of the photograph of the burning swastika on the front cover. The band issued a statement including: "Your government believes you cannot distinguish between anti-fascist and fascist propaganda."

A positive review in Melody Maker noted:

"...the Blaggers have the awareness and bravery to realise that something has to be said. This is a public service announcement with guitars. Happily, the Blaggers also realise that there's more to communication than impassioned ranting and make sure that the songs can be enjoyed as well as taken notice of. [...] bright horns, anthemic choruses and a series of well placed samples ensure that the sounds appeal to the body as well as the brain."

Whereas John Harris writing for the New Musical Express was more critical, saying "They back their politicised shouting with a hackneyed pot-pourri of punk-isms, shoddy reggae and cod-ska..." The following week the NME also described the album as a "refreshingly original combination of punk, ska, hip-hop, reggae, sampling and, most importantly in their scheme of things, radical anti-fascist politics."

Profane Existence reviewed the album as:

"an astonishingly well done slab of eclectic and powerful music. Mixing the classic sounds of U.K. ruts punk, in the vein of 999, the Clash, and the Lurkers, with a formidable ska beat brass section, and a funky rap overtone. These anarchist gangsters thrust a hot lead pipe of angry, anti-racist rhetoric straight up the ass of this nazi society..."

In 2009, the album was reissued by Mad Butcher Records in its "Mad Butcher Classics" series.

== Track listing ==
All tracks written and performed by Blaggers ITA.

1. "When the Gun Is Cocked" – 3:55
2. "It's Up to You (Part II – Battle of Waterloo)" – 2:04
3. "Search and Destroy" – 2:41
4. "Wild Side (Ram-Ravers Mix)" – 3:18
5. "That's Where It Ends" – 5:08
6. "The Way We Operate (X-Tatic Mix)" – 5:05
7. "Here's Johnny (Post Election Mix)" – 3:11
8. "Before I Hang (Double Deckers Mix)" – 2:42
9. "The Way to Die" – 2:21
10. "United States of Devastation" – 3:54
11. "Young Blaggers" – 1:21 *(CD bonus 1993)*
12. "Pitbull Mentality" – 3:21 *(CD bonus 1993)*
13. "Ten Men Dead" – 3:13 *(CD bonus 1993)*
14. "Bastard Chillin'" – 3:25 *(CD bonus 1993)*
15. "Emergency" – 5:57 *(CD bonus 1993)*

== Personnel ==
- Matty Blagg – vocals
- Christy Robson – vocals
- Paul "The Pig" – guitar
- Serious Steve – guitar
- Matt Vinyl – bass
- Jason Jester – drums
- Brendan Hodges – trumpet
- Olaf – saxophone
- Carlos Coutinho – sampler
- Thomas Mensforth – guest vocals on "That's Where It Ends"
- Harvey Birrell – engineer, producer
- Paul Harding – producer
- S.I.T. Inc. – design
- Karl WOW – layout
- Friends of Harry Roberts – typography
