= Blood Music (Chapterhouse album) =

Studio album by Chapterhouse
- Released: 6 September 1993
- Genres: Neo-psychedelia, alternative dance, shoegaze
- Length: 54:43
- Label: Dedicated Records
- Producers: Ralph Jezzard, Pascal Gabriel, Simon Postford, Paul Rabinger

Chapterhouse chronology
Whirlpool (1991)	Blood Music (1993)	The Best of Chapterhouse (2007)

Professional ratings
Review scores
Source	Rating
AllMusic	3/5 stars

Blood Music is the second and final studio album by British shoegaze band Chapterhouse. Early copies of this album, as well as North American and Japanese editions, include the bonus remix CD Pentamerous Metamorphosis by Global Communication. Cherry Red re-issued the album in 2008, prefaced by songs from the "Mesmerise" and "We Are The Beautiful" CD singles.

== Production ==
The album has a more pronounced electronic sound than its predecessor. Many producers contributed to the album. According to guitarist Simon Rowe, while the band's first album, Whirlpool, "originally had a very raw feel" and was made as an attempt by the band to sound like The Stooges live, Blood Music was "a different concept altogether". It has a lot more dance music influences that mainly came into play from vocalist/guitarist Andrew Sherrif.

== Critical reception ==
Ira Robbins, in Trouser Press, wrote: "Another tuneful delight in a different kitchen, Blood Music hustles and bustles, putting emphatic rhythms into songs that could have been cut from the first album’s sparkling pop cloth."

== Track listing ==
1. "Don't Look Now" (Andrew Sherriff)
2. "There's Still Life" (Simon Rowe)
3. "We Are the Beautiful" (Stephen Patman)
4. "Summer's Gone" (Rowe, Sherriff)
5. "Everytime" (Sherriff)
6. "Deli" (Ashley Bates, Rowe)
7. "On the Way to Fly" (Patman)
8. "She's a Vision" (Patman)
9. "Greater Power" (Patman)
10. "Confusion Trip" (Patman)
11. "Love Forever" (Rowe, Sherriff)
12. "Picnic" (Patman, Sherriff) (found only on vinyl and Japanese edition)

The US Limited Edition includes a bonus disc containing two remixes of We Are The Beautiful, Frost and Picnic.
