= Freefall (EP) =

EP by Chapterhouse
- Released: 10 September 1990
- Recorded: 1990
- Genre: Dream pop; shoegaze
- Length: 16:35
- Label: Dedicated Records

Chapterhouse chronology
Freefall (1990)	Sunburst (1990)

Freefall is the debut EP by Chapterhouse released in 1990. Its first track, "Falling Down", was used as part of their debut album, Whirlpool. The other tracks were released on the 2006 reissue of Whirlpool along with Sunburst and the "Pearl" single.

== Reception ==
Allmusic writer Ned Raggett described "Falling Down" as a "fantastic opener" with "swirling, sweet vocals underscored by a punchy (but not quite as electronic and crisp) funk rhythm". He also recommended the track "Inside of Me" for having a near Sonic Youth-level "rush of noise".

== Track listing ==
1. "Falling Down" – 4:00
2. "Need (Somebody)" – 3:09
3. "Inside of Me" – 4:42
4. "Sixteen Years" – 4:44
