= Whirlpool (Chapterhouse album) =

Studio album by Chapterhouse
- Released: 29 April 1991
- Recorded: 1990
- Genre: Shoegaze
- Length: 39:17
- Label: Dedicated
- Producer: Chapterhouse; Robin Guthrie; Ralph Jezzard; Stephen Hague

Chapterhouse chronology
Sunburst (1990)	Whirlpool (1991)	Blood Music (1993)

Singles from Whirlpool
- 1. "Pearl" Released: 18 March 1991

Whirlpool is the debut studio album by English shoegaze band Chapterhouse. It was released on 29 April 1991 by Dedicated Records.

== Release ==
Whirlpool was released on 29 April 1991 by Dedicated Records. It spent three weeks on the UK Albums Chart, peaking at number 23. "Pearl" was issued as the album's only single on 18 March 1991, reaching number 67 on the UK Singles Chart.

Cherry Red Records reissued Whirlpool in 2006 with several bonus tracks taken from Chapterhouse's EPs Freefall and Sunburst, both released in 1990, and the "Pearl" single. It also included, for the first time, printed lyrics for all of the album's songs.

The initial and subsequent runs of the Cherry Red CD reissue were pressed using a lossy master source for tracks 1 to 9, 13 and 14. The corrected version has the reference TC2159 printed on the inner CD ring. As of 2015, this was still the case, with Cherry Red reported as continuing to send out versions of the CD – now bearing the reference CDMRED304V2 – which were sourced from the lossy master, rather than the DAT, for tracks 1 to 9, 13 and 14.

== Critical reception ==
Professional ratings
Review scores
Source	Rating
AllMusic	4/5 stars
NME	8/10
Select	4/5
Stylus Magazine	B+

In 2016, Pitchfork ranked Whirlpool at number 17 on its list of the 50 best shoegaze albums of all time.

== Track listing ==
No.	Title	Writer(s)	Producer(s)	Length
1.	"Breather"	Andrew Sherriff	Ralph Jezzard	4:20
2.	"Pearl"	Sherriff	Jezzard	4:52
3.	"Autosleeper"	Stephen Patman	Chapterhouse; Robin Guthrie	4:50
4.	"Treasure"	Patman	Chapterhouse	6:22
5.	"Falling Down"	Sherriff	Chapterhouse; Stephen Hague	3:58
6.	"April"	Sherriff	Chapterhouse	4:39
7.	"Guilt"	Patman; Sherriff	Chapterhouse	4:15
8.	"If You Want Me"	Russell Barrett; Sherriff	Chapterhouse	2:41
9.	"Something More"	Sherriff	Guthrie	3:20
Total length:				39:17

2006 reissue bonus tracks
No.	Title	Writer(s)	Producer(s)	Length
10.	"Need (Somebody)"	Sherriff	Chapterhouse	3:07
11.	"Inside of Me"	Ashley Bates; Patman; Simon Rowe	Chapterhouse	4:40
12.	"Sixteen Years"	Barrett; Sherriff	Chapterhouse	4:41
13.	"Satin Safe"	Patman; Sherriff	Chapterhouse	5:42
14.	"Feel the Same"	Patman; Rowe	Chapterhouse	4:15
15.	"Come Heaven"	Patman	Chapterhouse; Jim Warren	5:32
16.	"In My Arms"	Sherriff	Chapterhouse; Warren	4:39
Total length:				71:53

== Personnel ==
Credits are adapted from the album's liner notes.

Chapterhouse

- Russell Barrett – bass
- Ashley Bates – drums
- Stephen Patman – vocals, guitar
- Simon Rowe – guitar
- Andrew Sherriff – vocals, guitar

Additional musicians

- Rachel Goswell – backing vocals on "Pearl"

Production

- Paul Adkins – recording
- Chapterhouse – production
- John Fryer – mixing
- Robin Guthrie – production on "Something More", additional mixing and production on "Autosleeper"
- Stephen Hague – additional mixing and production on "Falling Down"
- Ralph Jezzard – production on "Breather" and "Pearl"
- Jim Warren – recording

Design

- Albert Tupelo – design

== Charts ==
Chart (1991)	Peak position
UK Albums (OCC)	23
UK Independent Albums (OCC)	2
