= Jack (EP) =

EP by Moose
- Released: March 1991
- Genre: Shoegazing
- Length: 14:44
- Label: Hut
- Producer: Guy Fixsen

Moose chronology
Jack (1991)	Cool Breeze (1991)

Jack is the debut EP by British rock band Moose. It was released in March 1991 through Hut Records. Akin to Moose's two succeeding EPs, the album showcases a distortion-heavy shoegazing style, which was abandoned shortly before the recording of the band's debut album, ...XYZ (1992).

In 2012, the title track from the EP was included on PopMatters' list "10 Great Shoegaze Songs Submerged Beneath the Surface."

== Critical reception ==
Professional ratings
Review scores
Source	Rating
Allmusic	4.5/5 stars

Allmusic critic Jason Ankeny described the record as "a galvanizing and commanding debut", stating that the EP "immediately establishes Moose as noisemakers par excellence, creating feedback-rich pop with an urgency and ferocity not heard since the Jesus and Mary Chain's landmark Psychocandy." Ankeny also wrote: "Over just a handful of songs, Moose manage to convey the full scope of the shoegazer aesthetic."

== Track listing ==
All songs written by Kevin McKillop and Russell Yates.

1. "Jack" — 3:43
2. "Ballad of Adam and Eve" — 4:13
3. "Boy" — 3:44
4. "I'll Take Tomorrow" — 3:04

== Personnel ==
Moose

- Russell Yates — guitar, vocals
- Kevin J. McKillop — guitar
- Damien Warburton — drums
- Jeremy Tishler — bass

Other personnel

- Guy Fixsen — production
- C. Whitehead — photography
