= Chapterhouse (band) =

English shoegaze band

- Chapterhouse c. 1991

Background information
- Origin: Reading, England
- Genres: Shoegaze; dream pop
- Years active: 1987–1994, 2008–2010, 2025–present
- Labels: Dedicated Records, Cherry Red
- Members: Andrew Sherriff; Stephen Patman; Simon Rowe; Ashley Bates
- Past members: Jon Curtis; Russell Barrett; Steve Wren

Chapterhouse are an English shoegaze band from Reading, Berkshire. Formed in 1987 by Andrew Sherriff, Stephen Patman and Simon Rowe, the band began performing alongside Spacemen 3. They released two albums: Whirlpool (1991) and Blood Music (1993). The group temporarily reformed in 2008 after being asked to join Ulrich Schnauss onstage to perform his cover version of their song "Love Forever" at the Truck Festival in Oxfordshire. The band finished the brief reunion with two gigs in London (2009–2010) and tours in North America and Japan in 2010.

== Career ==
The band comprised Andrew Sherriff (b.16 May 1969, Wokingham, England), Stephen Patman (b. 8 November 1968, Windsor, Berkshire, England), Simon Rowe (b. 23 June 1969, Reading, Berkshire), Jon Curtis and Ashley Bates (b. 2 November 1971, Reading).

Rowe described that Chapterhouse was born from "friendship and common interests" among the founding members: Rowe, Sherriff and Patman. Rowe and Sherriff were next door neighbours who went to the same secondary school with Patman. As teenagers, they used to go to shows such as Cocteau Twins, The Jesus and Mary Chain, The Fall and others. The common musical interests the three shared then led them to learn guitar in their late-teenage years and to form the band at about age 19.

In 1989, the band moved to London to take a more serious path. They rehearsed and gigged for over a year before recording a demo tape. They were initially associated with the British acid rock genre, eventually becoming a part of the shoegazing scene along with acts such as Lush, Moose, Ride and Slowdive.

Bassist Jon Curtis left the group to study, and was replaced by Russell Barrett (b. 7 November 1968, Vermont, United States) in 1990.

Chapterhouse signed to the newly formed Dedicated label, releasing a series of singles, including "Pearl", which featured guest vocals by Rachel Goswell of Slowdive and reached No. 67 in the UK Singles Chart.

The band's first album, Whirlpool, released in 1991, has been cited as one of the shoegaze genre's high points, but failed to capture a wider market despite reaching No. 23 in the UK Albums Chart. In the same year, Chapterhouse also appeared in their home town Reading Festival immediately following Nirvana's performance.

The band's second album Blood Music, which was stylistically different, was released in 1993. According to Rowe, while the first album "originally had a very raw feel" and was made as an attempt by the band to sound like The Stooges live, Blood Music was "a different concept altogether". It had a lot more dance music influences that mainly came into play from Sherriff. Singles from the album "She's a Vision" and "We Are the Beautiful" were relatively successful. Some copies of Blood Music included a bonus disc "retranslated" by Global Communication, called Pentamerous Metamorphosis that was withdrawn due to a sampling lawsuit, but later reissued in a slightly altered version.

Following their split, the band released the 1996 double compilation album, Rownderbowt, which collected singles, B-sides, rarities, and unreleased demos—some of which featured Slowdive drummer Simon Scott. Afterwards, Chapterhouse went on a fifteen-year hiatus as the members pursued separate projects. Andrew Sherriff formed the electronic outfit Bio.com, while Simon Rowe joined Mojave 3. Ashley Bates formed Cuba before eventually joining the British folktronica group Tunng.

The music of Chapterhouse was mostly out of print on CD until March 2006, when Cherry Red Records reissued the album Whirlpool with bonus tracks, and for the first time, lyrics.

The band played a version of "Love Forever" with Ulrich Schnauss on the Barn Stage at the 2008 edition of Truck Festival. In response to requests over the years, Chapterhouse played live at Club AC30's Reverence show at the ICA on 26 November 2009 along with Schnauss and Kirsty Hawkshaw. This was preceded on 23 November by a warm up show at the Luminaire in Kilburn. The band also played at The Scala in London on 18 March 2010, and undertook short tours of Japan in April 2010 and North America in May 2010. The North American tour had to be postponed due to the Icelandic ash cloud cancelling flights, stranding Patman in Japan. Chapterhouse rescheduled the North American tour for September and October 2010. No plans were made for any other shows and the band ended the brief reunion in 2010.

On 22 March 2023, the band announced a deluxe CD box set release entitled Chronology. It contains previously released albums, singles, b-sides, remixes, and demos, including twenty unreleased songs. It was released on 26 May 2023 through Cherry Red Records.

In 2026, the band reunited for a UK and US tour to celebrate the 35th anniversary of their debut album, Whirlpool.

== Post-breakup ==
In 1997, Sherriff started working as a composer/sound designer for an Emmy Award-winning music production company Adelphoi Music. Patman and Bates joined him later in 2001. After more than twenty years, they departed from the company, pursuing their career as freelance composers. Bates also continues being a long-standing member of Tunng.

In October 2022, Rowe announced that he would be releasing a solo album, entitled Everybody's Thinking. The album was recorded with the help of all the Chapterhouse members, alongside Ian McCutcheon, Neil Halstead and Hamish Brown. The album was released on 2 March 2023 via Big Potato Records.

== Reunion ==
Chapterhouse reunited for a series of shows in the United States, playing alongside Hum and Nothing at the Slide Away Fest in May 2026. A show has also been added for the venue Whelan's in Dublin for 21 November 2026.

== Members ==
=== Last Lineup ===
- Andrew Sherriff – vocals, guitar (1987–1994, 2008–2010)
- Stephen Patman – vocals, guitar (1987–1994, 2008–2010)
- Simon Rowe – guitar (1987–1994, 2008–2010)
- Ashley Bates – drums (1987–1994, 2008–2010)
- Greg Moore - bass (2008-2010)

=== Current Lineup ===
Whirlpool 35th Anniversary Tour 2026

- Andrew Sherriff - vocals, guitar
- Stephen Patman - vocals, guitar
- Joe Light - guitar
- Greg Moore - bass
- Ashley Bates - drums

=== Touring ===
- Greg Moore – bass (2008–2010)
- Joe Light - guitar (2026)

=== Former ===
- Jon Curtis – bass (1987–1990)
- Russell Barrett – bass (1990–1994)

== Discography ==
=== Studio albums ===
- Whirlpool (1991) – UK No. 23
- Blood Music (1993) - US CMJ No. 17

=== Compilations ===
- Rownderbowt (1996)
- The Best of Chapterhouse (2007)
- Chronology (2023)

=== EPs ===
- Freefall (1990) UK no. 130
- Sunburst (1990) UK no. 126
- Pearl (1991)
- White House Demos (2025)

=== Singles ===
- "Something More" (1990)
- "Pearl" (1991) – UK No. 67
- "Falling Down" (1991) promo
- "Mesmerise" (1991) – UK No. 60
- "Mesmerise (remix)" (1991)
- "Don't Look Now" (1992)
- "She's a Vision" (1993) UK No. 82
- "We Are the Beautiful" (1993)

Year	Title	Peak		Album
Year	Title	UK	US Alt	Album
1991	"Pearl"	67	7	Whirlpool
1992	"Mesmerise"	60	21	Non-album single
1994	"We Are the Beautiful"	—	29	Blood Music
