= Blaggers ITA =

British punk rock band

- Origin: London
- Genres: Streetpunk, punk rock, rapcore, Oi!
- Years active: 1988–1996
- Labels: Words Of Warning, Parlophone

Blaggers ITA (formerly The Blaggers) were a British punk rock band founded in 1988 and disbanded in 1996. They were known for mixing punk with other styles and their left wing politics.

== History ==
=== Before forming ===
Main vocalist Matty 'Blagg' Roberts (b. 1964) had been affiliated with the far right British Movement when still at school, but then became a socialist and anti-fascist after reading books on the Black Panthers and George Orwell's 1984 whilst in prison.

Roberts subsequently fronted anti-fascist Oi! band Complete Control, who released an LP on Oi! Records in 1985

Original joint vocalist Bilko (a.k.a. Tim Wells) had sung with the Anti Social Workers who had released a dub-punk album Positive Style (Punky Reggae Party) with reggae producer Mad Professor on Ariwa in 1983.

=== The Blaggers ===
The original line up of the group formed in 1988 and was simply called "The Blaggers". Vocalists Roberts and Bilko were joined by Serious Steve (guitar), Matt Vinyl (bass) and Jezz the Jester (drums).

They released their debut album On Yer Toez on Oi! Records in 1989. The album included "House Of The Fascist Scum" an anti-fascist cover version of House of the Rising Sun.

Although the band initially played in a generic Oi! style, they later added a trumpet player and incorporated influences from hip hop and electronic dance music, including sampling, and added the letters ITA to their name ("In The Area"), inspired by Adrian Sherwood's On-U Sound Records.

=== Blaggers ITA ===
The first release under the new name was the "It's Up To You" 7" single in 1990. The band had several releases on the independent Words of Warning label, including the album United Colors Of Blaggers ITA in 1993.

The same year, they signed a record deal with EMI subsidiary Parlophone and enjoyed some commercial success with three minor hit singles. Stresss and Oxygen benefitted from promotional videos, while Abandon Ship saw a live TV appearance on Channel 4's The Word.

The record deal resulted in some criticism due to EMI's status as a major label and large corporation, and its former links with the arms trade. An anonymous leaflet entitled "DIY not EMI" circulated in London, highlighting the contradictions of an anti-racist band signing to a label with investments in the apartheid regime in South Africa.

In a debate strongly echoed four years later in the case of Chumbawamba, the band justified the move with the argument that the financial and promotional support of EMI would enable their political message to reach a wider public; they also argued that the deal gave the band more money to spend on political causes. For example, money earmarked for promotional events was used on full page adverts in the national music press promoting direct physical anti-fascist action, while creative use of tour support funds went to aid political groups throughout the country.

In January 1993, the band bootlegged their early recordings for EMI and released a 7" single under the name of Ramraiders ITA.

In July 1993, the group embarked on a high-profile ten date UK tour supporting Manic Street Preachers, sharing the front page of the New Musical Express with the group and other support act Credit to the Nation.

At the afterparty following the first date of the tour in Leeds, frontman Roberts allegedly punched Melody Maker writer Dave Simpson, as a consequence of Simpson stating that Roberts could never reform his fascist past, resulting in a court appearance and the case being dismissed. No trial took place. The incident led to the cancellation of festival appearances (including main stage slots at Reading and Glastonbury), and an effective boycott by the music press.

These events overshadowed the release of the group's final album, Bad Karma, in September 1994 and the ensuing tour supporting Pop Will Eat Itself. Blaggers ITA were dropped from EMI later that year.

The group released four singles on independent labels in 1995. A press release for the Damaged Goods label remarked on the band's return to an indie:

“While clearly there were some individuals within EMI who were very supportive of the band, particularly the MD, by August they were a small minority” explains manager Al Rhodes. “We could understand not being top priority at a label like EMI – we just weren’t prepared to not be on the list of priorities at all”. The band, on signing to Parlophone, suggested that “we’ve nicked this van called EMI and we’re gonna smash it through the plate glass window of the music business” but Rhodes ruefully remarked, “It was onlty after we’d got in the driving seat that we realised we couldn’t get it up to 40.”

Roberts left Blaggers ITA in June 1995, stating he was depressed and felt he was "holding the band back". The group continued without him, but by 1996 Blaggers ITA had called it a day.

=== Post breakup ===
Matty Roberts died on 22 February 2000. An obituary in Red Action described him as "a highly valued and trusted activist, playing a notable role in many a successful stewarding operation." Anti-Fascist Action (AFA) stated "Matty had been an active and enthusiastic member of London AFA during the late 80s and early 90s, a demanding time for anti-fascists. Matty was more than equal to those demands and became a valued activist, particularly noted for his courage on the streets".

A new version of the band named Blaggers AKA formed in 2002. This line up has played gigs and festivals across Europe, including benefits for the Independent Working Class Association and Antifa groups, but has not released any records.

== Politics ==
Blaggers ITA were noted for their strong anti-fascist and left wing lyrics and activism.

The band had close links with both Red Action and Anti Fascist Action (AFA), donating money to the organisations and promoting their ideology. The band's support for revolutionary politics and AFA meant that in the early 1990s they were part of direct action against Neo-Nazi groups such as Blood & Honour and Combat 18. For example all nine members of the group attended "The Battle of Waterloo" in 1992, in which AFA mobilised hundreds of anti-fascists to confront people assembling to attend a gig organised by Blood & Honour.

== Legacy ==
The group are namechecked in the 1997 novel Headhunters by John King.

== Lineup ==
=== Early-1990s lineup ===
- Matty Blagg - lead vocals
- Christy Robson - rapper/DJ
- Steve Serious - guitar
- Paul The Pig - guitar
- Matt Vinyl - bass
- Jason 'Wrist Action Jackson' Cook - drums
- Brendan 'Rimmer' Hodges - trumpet, samples and design (credited SIT Inc)
- Carlos Coutinho - keyboards

=== Other musicians ===
- Bilko - second vocalist (1988–1989)
- Jez the Jester - drums (1988–1989)
- Cab - drums (1989)
- Gary the Squatter - guitar (1989–1990)
- Olaf - sax (1992) + sax and vocalist (since 2001)
- Marcel - guitar (since 2001)
- Brian Hayes - guitar (1993-1996)

== Discography ==
=== Albums ===
- On Yer Toez (released as The Blaggers) (1989, Oi! Records, LP, OIR 14)
- Blaggamuffin (1991, Words Of Warning, Mini LP, WOWLP19)
- Fuck Fascism, Fuck Capitalism, Society's Fucked (1991, Knock Out Records & Nightmare Records, LP)
- God Save the Cockroach (1992, Words Of Warning, Mini LP, WOWLTD23) [aka New Kids On The Blag]
- United Colors Of Blaggers ITA (1993, Words Of Warning & DS4A, LP & CD, WOWLP27)
- Bad Karma (1994, Parlophone, LP & CD, PCSD 156)

=== Singles and EPs ===
- "It's Up To You" (1990, Network 90 Records, 7", WWFC 1)
- Beirut EP (1990, Knock Out Records & Nightmare Records, 7", KON 002)
- "Victory to ANC" (7" flexi disc given away free with U.K. Resist fanzine. Split with Trench Fever. 1991)
- "Wildside" (1991, Bunny Bites Back, 7", RAM 1) (bootleg credited to Ramraiders ITA)
- "Here's Johnny" (1992, Words Of Warning, 7", WOW 22)
- "The Way We Operate" (1992, Fluffy Bunny Records, 7", LAPD 187)
- "Stresss" (1993) (#56, UK Official Singles Chart)
- "Oxygen" (1993, Parlophone) (#51, UK Official Singles Chart)
- "Abandon Ship" (1993, Parlophone) (#48, UK Official Singles Chart)
- "Mantrap" (1994, Parlophone)
- "Thrill Her With a Gun/Dairy Thief" (1995, Damaged Goods, 7", DAMGOOD 58)
- "Rumblefish/Death by Cool" (1995, Disinformation, 7" & CD, BITA 01)
- "Guns Of Brixton" (1995, Disinformation, 7" & CD BITA 2)
- "Session" (1995, Disinformation, CD, BITA3CD)
