= Moose (band) =

British indie rock band

- Origin: London, England
- Genres: Indie rock; shoegaze; alternative rock
- Years active: 1990–2000
- Labels: Hut Records, Play It Again Sam
- Members: Russell Yates; K.J. "Moose" McKillop; Lincoln Fong; Russell Fong
- Past members: Jeremy Tishler; Damian Warburton; Richard Thomas

Moose were a British indie rock band who formed in London in 1990. The original line-up included Russell Yates (guitar, vocals), K.J. "Moose" McKillop (guitar, vocals), Damien Warburton (drums), and Jeremy Tishler (bass). After Warburton and Tishler left the band they were replaced with Lincoln Fong (bass), his brother Russell (guitar), and Richard Thomas (drums). Other members have included Mig Moorland (drums) and Mick Conroy (keyboards).

Moose released three EPs on Hut Records. Within the next few years the band released two albums on Play It Again Sam. Despite a strong critical response, Moose's albums continued to sell few copies. Following the release of their third album, Live a Little Love a Lot, Moose took an extended break from music only to return five years later with the release of High Ball Me!. The bulk of High Ball Me! had been recorded in 1996 and 1997, (with one song, "There's a Place," dating from 1993), but sat unreleased as the band members decided whether or not to continue with Moose. "This River Will Never Run Dry" featured on the Britpop collection, The Brit Box.

McKillop went on to become a founding member of the supergroup Piroshka, along with his partner Miki Berenyi (formerly of Lush), Justin Welch (Elastica) and Michael Conroy (Modern English).

== Musical style and influences ==
Unlike its contempories within the shoegaze movement, Moose largely omitted the heavily distorted wall of sound approach that was common among bands in the genre, instead opting for an acoustic guitar-driven sound with clean and jangly tones. The band's influences include American musicians Burt Bacharach and Tim Buckley, as well as rock bands such as the Byrds and R.E.M.

== Discography ==
=== Singles and EPs ===
- Jack (Hut, 1991) UK no. 108
- Cool Breeze (Hut, 1991) UK no. 82
- Reprise (Hut, 1991) UK no. 81
- "Little Bird (Are You Happy in Your Cage)?" (Hut, 1992) UK no. 92
- Liquid Make-up (Cool Badge, 1993) UK no. 131
- Uptown Invisible (Play It Again Sam, 1993) UK no. 144
- Bang Bang (Play It Again Sam, 1994)
- Baby It's Over (Saltwater Records, 1999)

=== Albums ===
- ...XYZ (Hut, 1992)
- Honey Bee (Play It Again Sam, 1993)
- Live a Little Love a Lot (Play It Again Sam, 1995)
- High Ball Me! (Nickel & Dimes/Saltwater Records/Le Grand Magistery, 2000)

=== Compilations ===
- Sonny & Sam (Hut/Virgin Records, 1991) – seven tracks taken from the first three EPs
