= Shoegaze =

Genre of alternative rock music

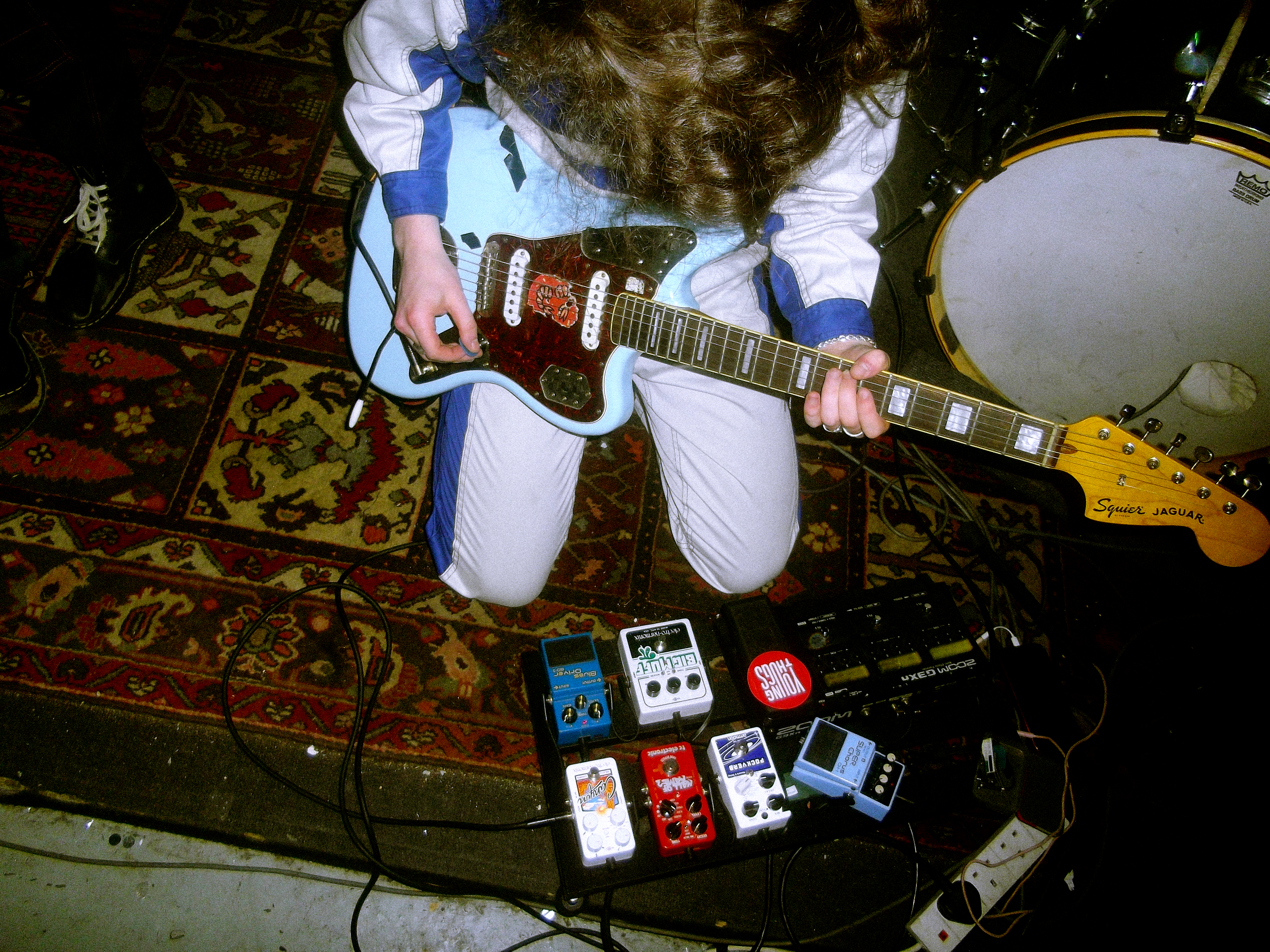
- Guitarist performing with an array of effects units
- Etymology: 1991, referencing guitarists in the genre who stared downwards at their guitar pedals
- Other names: Shoegazing
- Stylistic origins: Indie rock; alternative rock; neo-psychedelia; psychedelia; noise pop; dream pop; post-punk; ethereal wave; punk rock; garage rock; space rock
- Cultural origins: Late 1980s–early 1990s, United Kingdom
- Derivative forms: Witch house; grungegaze; zoomergaze

Subgenres
- Christian shoegaze

Fusion genres
- Blackgaze; doomgaze

Other topics
- Ambient; glide guitar; post-rock; post-metal; grunge; Britpop; shitgaze; Wall of Sound; soft grunge

Shoegaze (originally shoegazing) is a subgenre of indie and alternative rock characterised by ethereal soundscapes, obscured vocals, and extensive use of guitar effects and distortion. Rooted in Phil Spector's Wall of Sound, the Velvet Underground, and psychedelic pop of the 1960s, the genre originated in the late 1980s and early 1990s mainly among acts who based their sound on Scottish bands Cocteau Twins and the Jesus and Mary Chain and Irish band My Bloody Valentine. "Shoegazing" was coined in 1991 by music executive Andy Ross when describing Moose and first used by the British music press as a pejorative for bands with a motionless stage presence and guitarists who directed their look down towards their effects pedals. It was sometimes used interchangeably with "dream pop".

The original scene developed after the introduction of Kevin Shields' glide guitar technique on My Bloody Valentine's 1988 records You Made Me Realise and Isn't Anything. Concentrated in London and the greater Thames Valley region, its core acts included Ride, Swervedriver, Slowdive, Chapterhouse, Lush, and Moose; they often attended each other's concerts, shared producers and labels (Creation and 4AD), and adopted similarly abstract approaches to album artwork. Another journalists' term of derision, "The Scene That Celebrates Itself", was applied to these musicians and adjacent non-shoegaze acts such as Stereolab.

Shoegaze reached its peak in 1991 with the release of My Bloody Valentine's second album, Loveless, but was overshadowed by the rise of the American grunge scene and the following Britpop movement. In subsequent years, a gradual critical reassessment was driven by new listeners discovering the genre through the Internet. Numerous revivals have since emerged in the form of nu gaze (sometimes "second-wave shoegaze") and blackgaze in the 2000s, grungegaze in the 2010s, and zoomergaze in the 2020s. Other music styles, such as witch house, have reconfigured aspects of the genre.

== Etymology ==
=== Origins ===
The term shoegaze—originally shoegazing—was coined by Andy Ross, who was a part-time Sounds contributor and head of Food Records, the label that promoted Blur. On March 15, 1991, Ross attended Lush's concert at the Venue in New Cross with his then assistant Polly Birkbeck, where Blur and Moose also performed as support. According to Birkbeck, Ross jokingly referred to Moose as "shoegazers" after noticing vocalist Russell Yates continuously looking down at his shoes during the set; guitarist Kevin McKillop later explained that Yates was actually reading lyric sheets placed on the floor as he couldn't remember them. According to writer Ryan Pinkard, an erroneous story claimed that Ross introduced the word "shoegazing" in a live review of the concert published in Sounds. Polly Birkbeck and Nathaniel Cramp (founder of Sonic Cathedral), whom Pinkard interviewed for his book on shoegaze, confirmed that no such review existed in issues of Sounds from that period.

The earliest confirmed print use of the term appeared in the May 25, 1991, edition of NME, where Steve Lamacq, announcing Slowdive's third EP, Holding Our Breath, referred to the band as "shoe-gazers". This use predated Ross's recollection in his 2016 HuffPost article, in which he stated that he pitched "shoegazing" to Lamacq and fellow NME writer Simon Williams over lunch on October 9, 1991, after Sounds was shut down and he no longer had a publication in which he could promote his "groundbreaking genre". According to Pinkard, the appearance of the term in print several months earlier than Ross's conversation with Lamacq and Williams suggested a problem with Ross's timeline, with the most likely explanation being that he "got the dates wrong".

=== Criticism ===
The term shoegaze was initially used as a pejorative, which led to several musicians and journalists promptly criticizing it. Ride's Mark Gardener stated that the term was an "English label", that wasn't known in Japan and America, he criticized the term for inaccurately representing "passionate" groups as apathetic and compared the style to the Velvet Underground who "could stand still and make a load of noise". Among first-wave shoegaze bands, "shoegazing" was also divisive, even more so than the term "The Scene That Celebrates Itself", coined a few weeks later by Steve Sutherland in Melody Maker on June 8, 1991, in a live review of Moose's concert at the Camden Underworld. In the 2000s, the term "shoegaze" lost its negative connotations after the genre was reassessed amid a revival driven by new listeners discovering the music on the internet.

British music journalist Paul Lester stated, "All bands hate labels, but with shoegaze, the sense of derision was factored into the name from the word go". Music journalist Chris Roberts stated that the term was "a throwaway comment in the pub", adding "It's such a lame name, and it doesn't even work as an umbrella term. I mean, loads of bands from other genres look at their feet. Pink Floyd stared at their shoes. Does that make them shoegaze?". Musician Greg Ackell cited bands such as the Cure and the Jesus and Mary Chain as being "pretty fucking still on stage", noting that the Velvet Underground showcased "that kind of stoic, backlit presence". Jim Reid of the Jesus and Mary Chain opined that shoegaze "doesn't actually exist" and that "it was some clown at the NME [who] made that up".

== Characteristics ==
=== Sound ===
"1998-"
"1998-" by dotstokyo, a freely-licensed shoegaze track

Shoegaze combines ethereal, swirling vocals with layers of distorted, bent, or flanged guitars to create a wash of sound where no instrument is distinguishable from the others. To achieve this, shoegaze musicians often employ a wide range of effects pedals, including reverb, delay, chorus, tremolo, and distortion.

According to Pitchfork, shoegaze is "above all else" a space for exploring the outer edges of guitar texture, and emotionally it turns inward—it's "music for dreaming". Although shoegaze has at times been used interchangeably with dream pop, the two are distinct. Galaxie 500 founder Dean Wareham explained the difference, noting that "shoegaze bands are more of an assault, a wall of sound", while dream pop allows "more room for melody and counter-melody, whether on vocals, keyboards, or guitars."

=== Visual style ===
According to Victor Provis the visual style of shoegaze album covers and music videos reflected its music. He wrote that the genre developed "an artistic code based on close-ups of objects, to the point of losing their definition and becoming nothing more than coloured, amorphous blotches"; it also often incorporated "fusions of images, projections, colour filters, and swirling cameras". Meanwhile, Rolling Stone Australia, when placing Loveless in its "100 Best Album Covers of All Times" list, noted that abstraction was a common visual aesthetic for turn-of-the-1990s shoegaze bands, including My Bloody Valentine, Ride, Slowdive, and Swervedriver. Slowdive's member Simon Scott considered that "Robert Smith, when he was in Siouxsie and the Banshees playing guitar [on the 1983's Nocturne live video], was the coolest as he just stood there and let the music flood out", which was like anti showmanship.

== History ==
=== 1960–early 1980s: Roots and early influences ===
The influences were very '60s, with the Beach Boys, the Beatles, and the Phil Spector "Wall of Sound." I think we were trying to turn that into something from our era that was more violent, more of a sonic assault.

— Alan Moulder, producer.

Shoegaze traces its roots to Phil Spector's Wall of Sound technique, along with the psychedelic pop pioneered in the 1960s by bands such as the Byrds, the Beach Boys, and the Beatles. Songs such as "Tomorrow Never Knows" (1966) and "It's All Too Much" (1969) by the Beatles, as well as "All I Wanna Do" (1970) by the Beach Boys have been retrospectively viewed as early predecessors of the genre. Other influences include the Velvet Underground, the Stooges, MC5, and the garage rock compilation albums Nuggets and Pebbles.

Additionally, writer Vernon Joynson cites David Bowie's song "'Heroes'" (1977) written by Bowie and Brian Eno, as showcasing "the type of noisy production with distorted and reverberated guitars and a dreamy hazy atmosphere all of which became key ingredients of shoegaze". Siouxsie and the Banshees and the Cure are equally formative influences.

=== 1982–1988: Origins ===
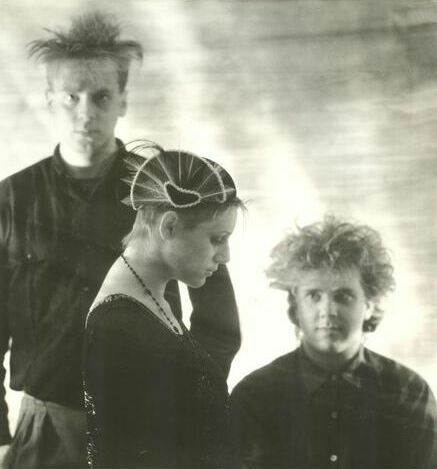
Often classified as dream pop, Scottish band Cocteau Twins paved the way for the shoegaze genre.

As a music genre, shoegaze developed in the 1980s, when a group of Scottish and Irish bands such as Cocteau Twins, the Jesus and Mary Chain, and—most notably—My Bloody Valentine reimagined the sound of the electric guitar, combining contrasting sonic textures with dreamy vocals that challenged the idea of the singer as the central figure of the band.

Emerging from the UK alternative scene with their 1982 debut album, Garlands, on 4AD, the Scottish trio Cocteau Twins had a substantial influence on the development of shoegaze. Their music featured ethereal, atmospheric guitar textures crafted by guitarist and producer Robin Guthrie, alongside Elizabeth Fraser's distinctive, often unintelligible vocals, which were mixed low in the recordings. Another Scottish group, the Jesus and Mary Chain, is credited as the immediate forerunner of shoegaze. Blending conventional pop with noise and guitar feedback, their 1985 debut album, Psychocandy, exerted a major influence on the subsequent shoegaze bands, including My Bloody Valentine, with Creation Records founder Alan McGee noting that the latter "changed their style because of The Jesus and Mary Chain."

Parallel to this, groups such as Spacemen 3 and Loop revived elements of 1960s space rock in their first albums (Sound of Confusion, 1986; Heaven's End, 1987), exploring minimalist, droning psychedelia over conventional pop structures. According to Peter Kember, Spacemen 3 "could be called a shoegaze band" due to their lack of "stage moves" and focus on their own sound rather than how they were "trying to look".

Across the Atlantic, American indie bands such as Sonic Youth, Dinosaur Jr., and Hüsker Dü also helped shape shoegaze's guitar language, particularly influencing My Bloody Valentine. In 1988, after several stylistic and lineup changes, the group released their breakthrough third EP, You Made Me Realise, on Creation Records, which showcased frontman Kevin Shields' newfound approach to guitar playing, known as "glide guitar". Later that year, their debut album, Isn't Anything, was critically acclaimed and credited with establishing the shoegaze genre.

Other late-1980s British bands such as A.R. Kane, The House of Love, Kitchens of Distinction, Bark Psychosis, and The Telescopes were also credited with contributing to the sound that would later develop into shoegaze.

=== 1989–1996: Prominence and decline ===
==== Rise of the scene ====
Shoegaze began to emerge as a distinct music scene in late 1989 and came into full view in 1990. Ivo Watts-Russell signed Lush and Pale Saints to his record label 4AD after seeing them both perform at the same concert at The Camden Falcon in April 1989. In September 1989, 4AD released Pale Saints' first EP, Barging Into the Presence of God, followed by Lush's debut mini-album Scar. Both records produced by John Fryer—who had previously worked with Cocteau Twins—were well received by the British music press and each reached number 3 on the UK Indie Chart. In December, Pale Saints and Lush played a co-headlining show in Leeds, which received a mixed live review from Melody Maker.

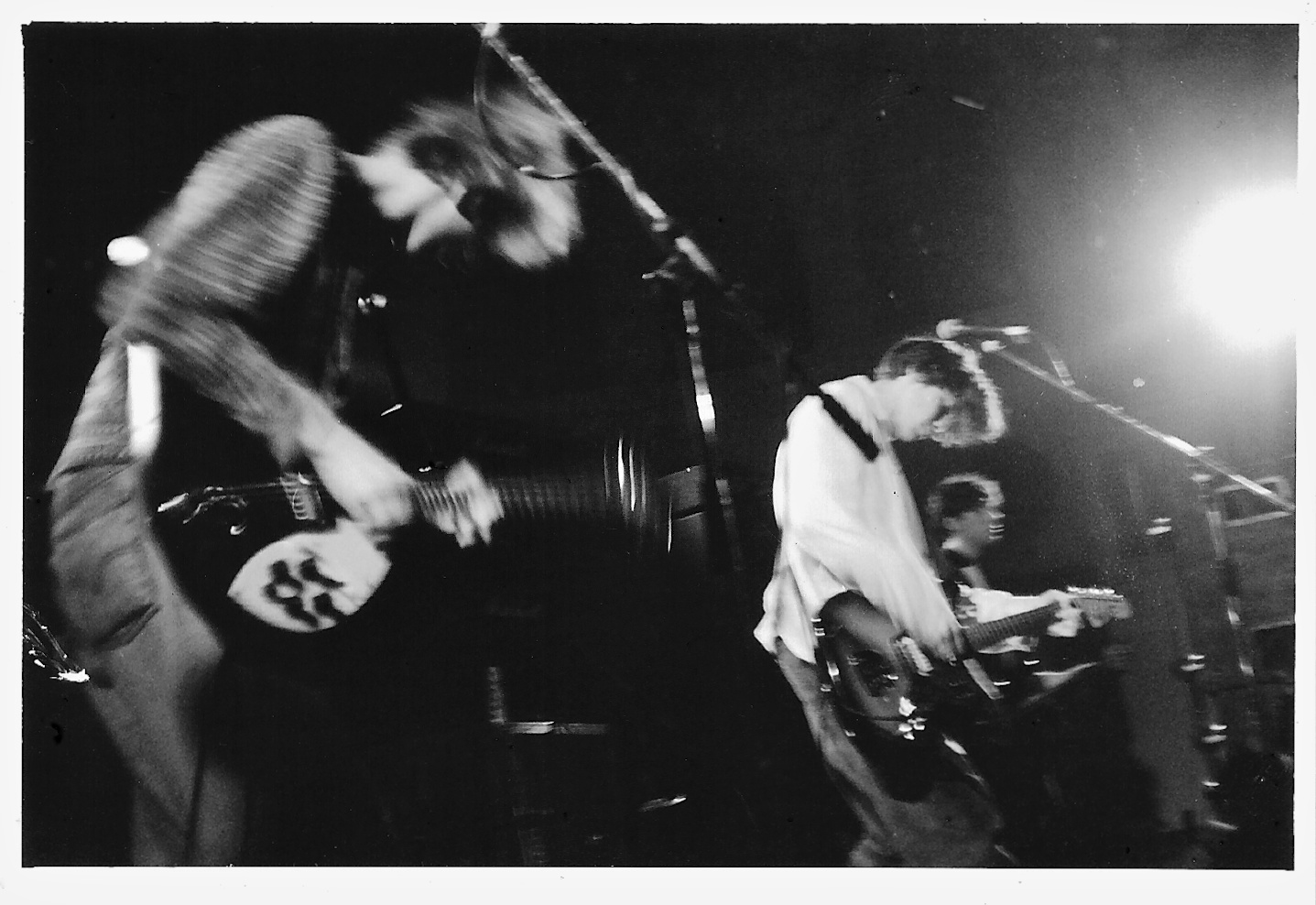
In 1990, Ride emerged as shoegaze's most prominent act.

In 1990, Ride emerged at the forefront of the shoegaze movement. After signing with Creation Records the previous year, the group released three consecutive EPs—Ride, Play, and Fall—followed by their debut album, Nowhere. Their televised performance of "Drive Blind" on Snub TV, which coincided with the release of their first EP, helped bring the band to wider attention. Melody Maker and NME critics praised Ride's blend of dense guitar textures and melodic songwriting, while Nowhere—mixed by producer Alan Moulder after a troubled recording process—became one of the genre's defining works.

In February, Pale Saints released their debut album The Comforts of Madness, which NME described as having "absolutely no stinkers." That same month, Lush issued the Mad Love EP, produced by Cocteau Twins' Robin Guthrie, whose mentorship refined the band's once-chaotic sound into a polished, "beautiful, primitive" record, according to a Melody Maker review. In April, Creation released My Bloody Valentine's Glider EP, including the track "Soon", which reached number 2 on the UK Indie Chart and was later described by Brian Eno as "the vaguest music ever to have been a hit." The label also released debut EPs by Swervedriver (Son of Mustang Ford) and Slowdive (Slowdive EP), the latter earning Melody Maker's "Single of the Week."

Meanwhile, The Boo Radleys released their debut album, Ichabod and I, on Action Records, which received little attention from the press. Chapterhouse followed with the Freefall and Sunburst EPs, while Lush's Sweetness and Light EP demonstrated shoegaze's pop potential despite Melody Maker's critique of its title track as "sorely over-produced". The year's end also saw Swervedriver's Rave Down EP, which bassist Adi Vines described as "ethereal metal" after it earned praise in a heavy metal magazine.

By the end of 1990, shoegaze had gained significant underground traction. John Peel included three Ride songs on his year-end Festive Fifty list. Ride's Nowhere appeared in Melody Maker's Top 30 albums of 1990 (#20), while My Bloody Valentine's Glider (#5), Ride's Fall (#7), and Lush's Mad Love (#19) featured in the magazine's year-end singles poll.

==== The Scene That Celebrates Itself ====
One common thread the British music press used to group shoegaze bands together was that many of them came from the Thames Valley, a region including Oxford (home to Ride and Swervedriver) and Reading (Slowdive and Chapterhouse). These groups, along with Lush and Moose (both formed in London) constituted the core acts of the original shoegaze scene. My Bloody Valentine, however, wasn't part of the scene despite being the progenitors of the genre.

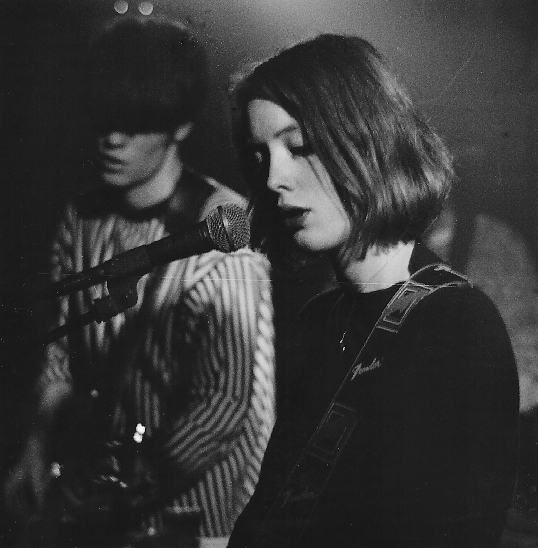
Slowdive performing live in 1992.

Members of the scene often attended each other's concerts, shared producers and labels (Creation, 4AD), and adopted similar approaches to album artwork. Notable meeting places included Syndrome, a weekly indie club on Oxford Street, as well as venues such as the Camden Falcon and the Borderline. Outside London, the bands often toured together, and when the music press eventually took notice, the scene was quickly named and sensationalised.

The phrase "The Scene That Celebrates Itself" was coined by Melody Maker journalist Steve Sutherland on June 8, 1991, in a review of a Moose concert at the Camden Underworld. He observed that the audience was filled with members of similar bands, including Damon Albarn from Blur, Miki Berenyi (Lush), Andrew Sherriff (Chapterhouse), and Mark Gardener (Ride). Although Sutherland later noted that the term was intended as a compliment—reflecting his impression that the bands regularly attended each other's performances, which was unusual at the time—it was soon used derisively by the music press.

Beyond the core groups, the scene also included artists such as avant-pop band Stereolab, which frequently exchanged members with Moose, Th' Faith Healers, and early Blur. In addition, the press also associated Catherine Wheel, Curve, Cranes, Silverfish, and Pale Saints with the movement, even if they had few or no ties to the London club scene.

==== The arrival of grunge ====
In 1991, after winning Melody Maker's end-of-year readers' poll for Best Band, Ride appeared on the magazine's January cover, which proclaimed them "Your Brightest Hope for a Grand New Year." The group's extensive touring and the success of their fourth EP, Today Forever, further elevated their profile and led to an appearance on Top of the Pops. While this moment marked shoegaze's brief entry into mainstream culture, Ride's declining sales soon underscored the genre's limited mass appeal.

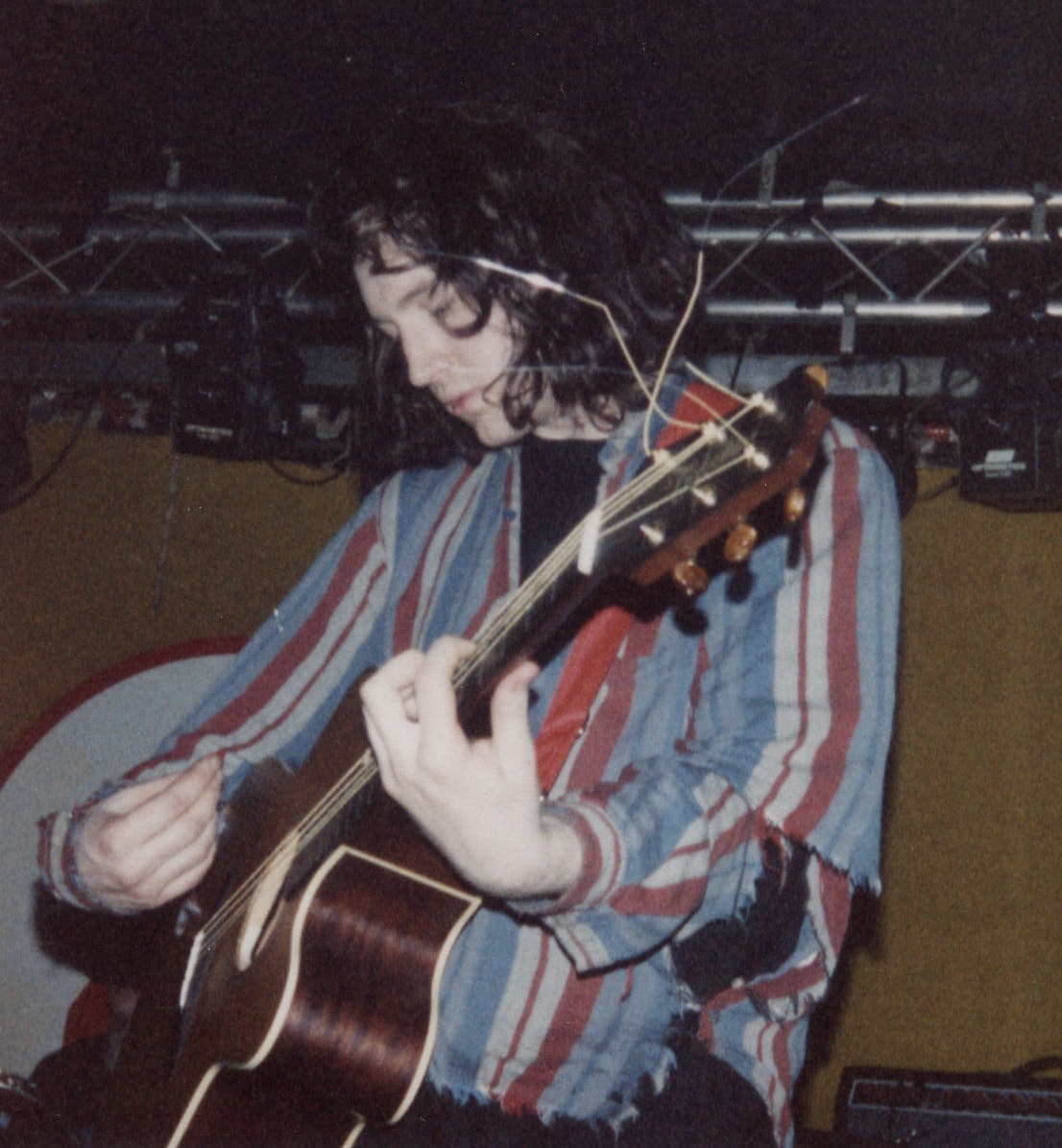
Following Loveless, Kevin Shields retreated from public life and new recordings.

Early 1991 saw a wave of several shoegaze releases. In February, Creation Records issued My Bloody Valentine's Tremolo EP, showcasing the band's experimentation with sampling. Two weeks later, the label released Slowdive's Morningrise EP, which Melody Maker praised for its "mutant orchestral beauty". Although Chapterhouse's third EP, Pearl, received a negative review in NME, their debut album, Whirpool, became a commercial success. In March, Moose and Curve debuted with the Jack and Blindfold EPs respectively, the latter noted for its unusual blend of dream pop and techno production. Meanwhile, Kitchens of Distinction released their second album, Strange Free World, which, despite Patrick Fitzgerald's unconventional vocal style for the genre, went on to become a shoegaze classic.

Significant albums released during the first half of 1991 include Mercury Rev's (Yerself Is Steam), Catherine Wheel's (Painful Thing EP), Pale Saints's (Flesh Balloon EP), Slowdive's (Holding Our Breath EP) and Swervedriver's (Sandblasted EP).

The release of Nirvana's Nevermind in September abruptly shifted global attention toward American grunge. Slowdive's debut album, Just for a Day, released the same month, received a lukewarm critical reception, marking the first sign of shoegaze's decline. In contrast, Swervedriver's debut Raise received stronger reviews, with Steve Sutherland describing it as "a great road movie for the ears". Lush's Black Spring EP also performed well but was overshadowed by lineup changes and exhaustion from relentless touring.

"Soon"
The closing track "Soon", from the 1991 album Loveless by My Bloody Valentine.

Shoegaze reached its peak in November 1991 with the release of My Bloody Valentine's Loveless. Noted for its innovative production and dense, immersive sound, the album—reportedly costing £270,000 and recorded over two and a half years across nineteen studios—often tops lists of the best shoegaze releases. In December 1991, journalist Simon Reynolds introduced shoegaze to American readers as "dream pop" in The New York Times.

==== Decline ====
In 1992, shoegaze started to decline in popularity. Part of the growing backlash was linked to the perception that many shoegaze bands came from privileged, middle-class backgrounds. NME reinforced this perception with a satirical column, "Memoirs of a Shoegazing Gentleman," written from the perspective of the fictional Lord Tarquin, who, in diary-like entries, described absurd situations at an elite boarding school supposedly attended by all shoegaze musicians.

I think there was a genuine belief at the beginning that there was something middle class about the [shoegaze] music. I can't really say why, but it wasn't party music, let's say that.

— David Quantick, journalist, NME.

In January 1992, Lush's debut album, Spooky, received a lukewarm review from NME, which described the band as "due for a good kicking" after "a good run of press encouragement." A week later, Creation Records released the Boo Radleys' Everything's Alright Forever. NME hailed the band's confident attitude as a refreshing contrast to 1991's "(complacen) sea of mumbles." Meanwhile, Ride moved beyond their early shoegaze sound, drawing influence from such bands as R.E.M. and Massive Attack on their second album, Going Blank Again. That year, Creation signed shoegaze band Adorable, who were ultimately dropped after a string of Top 5 singles and the release of their 1993 debut album, Against Perfection. Vocalist Pete Fijalkowski noted that after Sony partially acquired Creation in 1992, "there was enormous pressure on the label to make every band profitable".

The first half of 1992 also saw the release of Ferment by Catherine Wheel, Doppelgänger by Curve, and In Ribbons by Pale Saints. Following Ferment, Catherine Wheel adopted a heavier, more metal-leaning sound on their 1993 album Chrome, later moving toward straightforward hard rock. In April 1992, the British music press began turning its attention toward the emerging Britpop movement, with Melody Maker featuring the then-unknown Suede on its cover as "The Best New Band in Britain."

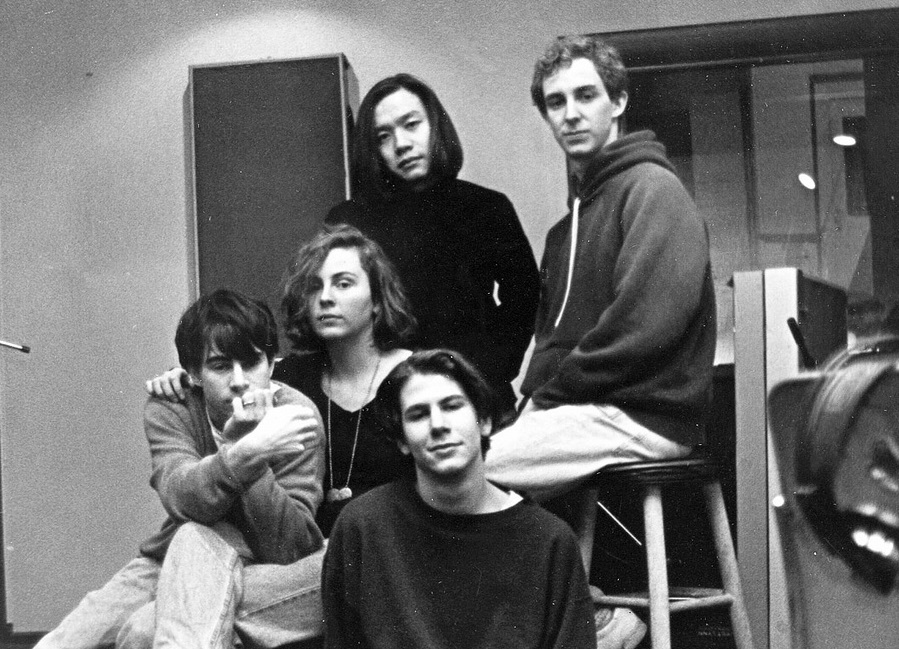
In 1992, Melody Maker dubbed Delaware, the debut album by the American band Drop Nineteens, "the first decent album" in the shoegaze style.

While facing growing hostility at home, shoegaze found renewed support in the US, where audiences were less influenced by the British music press. In June 1992, American shoegaze band Drop Nineteens released their debut album, Delaware, which Melody Maker's review ironically described as "the first decent album in a Scene style" to come from "America (Boston, to be precise), so late in the day." Other American bands soon followed with their own debuts, including Lilys' In the Presence of Nothing and Medicine's Shot Forth Self Living in late 1992, and Swirlies' Blonder Tongue Audio Baton in early 1993.

In September 1992, Moose released their debut album ...XYZ, produced by Mitch Easter, who had previously worked with R.E.M. The album largely departed from the band's earlier shoegaze sound, incorporating country influence. That same month, Melody Maker ran a three-page feature by Paul Lester titled "Whatever Happened to Shoegazing?", which both announced Moose's new album and portrayed the British shoegaze scene as a brief, outdated phenomenon.

A major turning point came in March 1993 with Suede's self-titled debut album, which became the fastest-selling debut in British history at the time and marked the rise of Britpop. The movement accelerated in 1994 with greater successes for Blur's Parklife and Oasis's Definitely Maybe, presenting a lively, extroverted alternative to both grunge and shoegaze. Oasis brought substantial commercial success to Creation Records, and after 1994 the label shifted its focus away from its earlier shoegaze roster.

June 1993 saw the release of Slowdive's second album, Souvlaki, which was dismissed by Melody Maker's reviewer notoriously writing, "I would rather drown choking in a bath full of porridge than ever listen to it again." That same month, Lush released Split to a lukewarm reaction both critically and commercially. Meanwhile, Swervedriver's second album, Mezcal Head, had a relative success, especially with the US audiences, where they toured with such bands as Soundgarden and the Smashing Pumpkins.

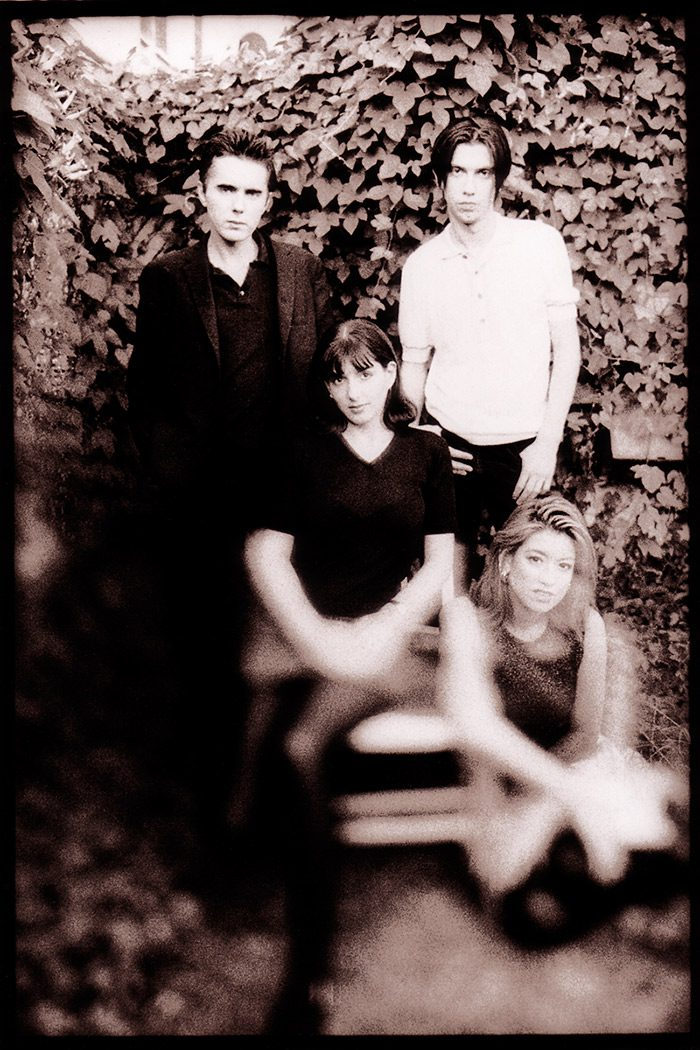
Lush were among several shoegaze groups to adopt Britpop in their most commercially successful album, Lovelife.

After 1994, several shoegaze bands shifted to a Britpop-oriented sound, including Ride (Carnival of Light), Lush (Lovelife), and Kitchens of Distinction (Cowboys and Aliens). However, none of these albums maintained the bands' earlier commercial or critical standing, let alone elevated it—with the partial exception of Lush—particularly in contrast to the Boo Radleys, whose 1995 single "Wake Up Boo!" propelled their album Wake Up! to number 1 on the UK Albums Chart. Meanwhile, Chapterhouse moved toward alternative dance on 1993's Blood Music, while Slowdive explored minimalist electronica and post-rock on 1995's Pygmalion.

In 1995, Creation Records owner Alan McGee dropped Slowdive a week after Pygmalion was released, and Neil Halstead, Rachel Goswell, and Ian McCutcheon soon formed Mojave 3, pursuing a light, melodic blend of indie folk and Americana. Swervedriver were dropped while nearing completion of their third album, Ejector Seat Reservation. Ride, facing internal conflict, broke up in 1996 while working on their fourth album, Tarantula. Lush, after achieving their highest chart success with Lovelife, ended abruptly the same year following drummer Chris Acland's suicide. Meanwhile, My Bloody Valentine went on a two-decade hiatus, despite having signed with Island Records in 1992 for a reported £250,000.

=== Christian shoegaze and Tooth & Nail Records ===
Starflyer 59 made shoegaze immediately accessible within evangelical Christian communities throughout the United States.

Christian shoegaze emerged in the early 1990s alongside the rise of Tooth & Nail Records, founded in 1993 by Brandon Ebel to support Christian artists working outside mainstream CCM conventions. One of the label's first signings was Starflyer 59, led by Jason Martin. Influenced by the idea of combining dreamy melodies with the heavy guitar riffs of bands such as Black Sabbath and Deep Purple, the band's first three albums—Silver (1994), Gold (1995), and Americana (1997)—displayed a strong shoegaze orientation. Despite its troubled recording process, Gold became a notable release, later ranking number 41st on Pitchfork's "50 Best Shoegaze Albums of All Time" list.

Throughout the 1990s, Tooth & Nail also supported a few other shoegaze-leaning Christian groups, including Morella's Forest and Velour 100. These bands expanded the boundaries of Christian alternative rock, but their experimentation often met with limited commercial success, along with frequent criticism from some conservative Christian audiences. By the late 1990s, many of these groups shifted away from their early shoegaze sounds. Starflyer 59 incorporated brighter, more indie rock arrangements on albums such as The Fashion Focus. Morella's Forest moved toward an electropop sound, while the Prayer Chain (signed to Rode Dog Records) disbanded after their 1995 album Mercury. The band's guitarist, Andy Prickett, later pursued non-Christian projects, producing young shoegaze acts such as the Autumns.

=== 2000s: Nu gaze ===
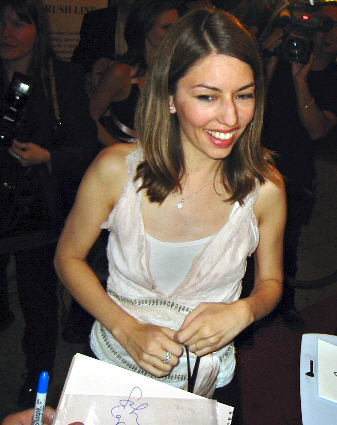
The soundtrack to Sofia Coppola's 2003 film Lost in Translation is credited with helping revive interest in shoegaze in the new millennium.

Following its decline in the mid-1990s, most former shoegaze musicians moved into other careers, and the term "shoegaze" was often regarded as derogatory. A gradual reassessment began in the early 2000s, driven by new listeners discovering the genre through the internet, including the early social-media platform MySpace. Cinema also helped keep the style in circulation, with American indie films such as 1994's Amateur and 1997's Joyride featuring shoegaze music in their soundtracks. Director Gregg Araki used the genre extensively in his filmography, titling The Living End (1992) and Nowhere (1997) after releases by the Jesus and Mary Chain and Ride, while 2004's Mysterious Skin featured original music by Robin Guthrie. Meanwhile, Sofia Coppola, inspired by Wong Kar-wai's Chungking Express—a film noted for its shoegaze-like visual style and its Cantonese-language covers of Cocteau Twins' and the Cranberries' songs—recruited Kevin Shields to contribute original music to her Oscar-winning Lost in Translation.

In the early 2000s, an international wave of bands taking influence from shoegaze began to take shape with England's My Vitriol, Sweden's the Radio Dept. and France's M83. Publications of the time called this "nu gaze". Following the release of their debut EP, Finelines (2001), My Vitriol experienced a sudden rise in notoriety, its single "Always: Your Way" entering the UK's top 40 charts, leading them to perform at Top Of The Pops, Glastonbury Festival and Reading Festival. The following year the band went on hiatus, leading to the rise in popularity of the Radio Dept. and M83. By 2007, the movement had led to an increased notoriety of contemporary albums by artists including Maps, Blonde Redhead, Mahogany, Deerhunter, Asobi Seksu, and Ulrich Schnauss.

In 2002, German record label Morr Music released Blue Skied an' Clear, a two-disc Slowdive tribute album featuring indie electronic artists, many inspired by Pygmalion. Among them was ambient techno producer Ulrich Schnauss, whose 2003 album A Strangely Isolated Place drew openly from the sound of Slowdive and Chapterhouse. That same year, French electronic duo M83 released their second album, Dead Cities, Red Seas & Lost Ghosts, which Pitchfork retrospectively described as "the most original take on shoegaze in years". In 2003, Pitchfork's placed Loveless at number 2 on its updated "Top 100 Albums of the 1990s" list, introducing the album to a new generation of listeners.

Throughout the 2000s, shoegaze grew increasingly referenced among listeners and new artists, with the term being loosely applied to releases such as Jesu's Jesu (2004), Autolux's Future Perfect (2004), Asobi Seksu's Citrus (2006), Blonde Redhead's 23 (2007), the self-titled debuts of A Place to Bury Strangers (2007) and The Pains of Being Pure at Heart (2009), and A Sunny Day in Glasgow's Ashes Grammar (2009).

In 2006, former NME sub-editor Nathaniel Cramp established the label Sonic Cathedral, which went on to release shoegaze-oriented work by bdrmm, Whitelands, deary, as well as solo projects from Emma Anderson, Slowdive's Neil Halstead, and Ride's Andy Bell.

==== Band reunions ====
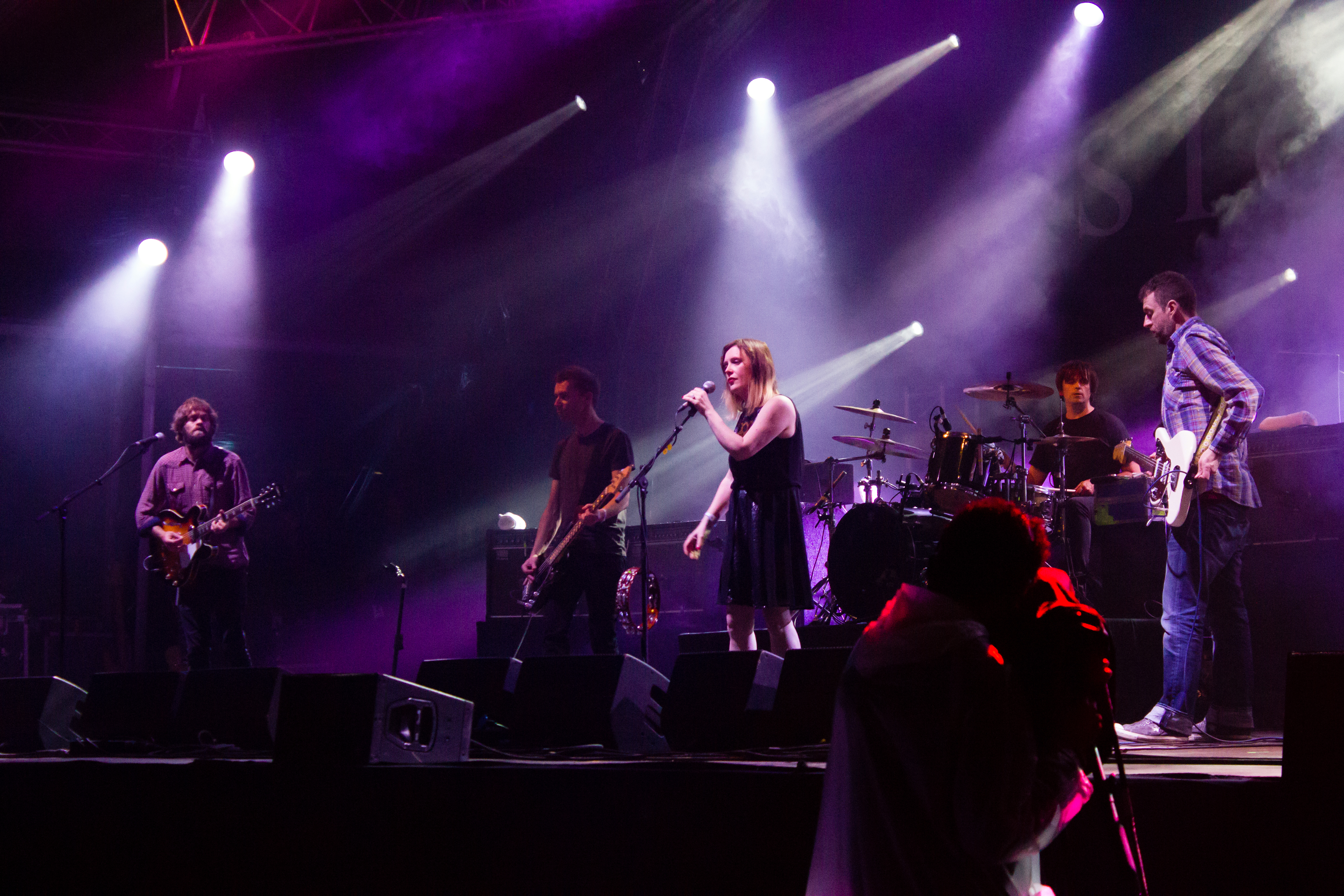
Slowdive performing at Primavera in 2014.

In 2007, My Bloody Valentine initiated a wave of reunions among former shoegaze bands by returning to the stage and later releasing their third album, m b v, to critical acclaim. Chapterhouse briefly reformed between 2008 and 2010, while Swervedriver resumed activity in 2008 and subsequently released new material: 2015's I Wasn't Born to Lose You and 2019's Future Ruins. Ride reunited in 2015, touring internationally and releasing three new albums: Weather Diaries, This Is Not a Safe Place, and Interplay. Lush returned in 2016 for a Europe and the US tour; although internal tensions during the tour led to another split, the reunion produced their final EP, Blind Spot. Drop Nineteens reformed in 2022, releasing their third album, Hard Light, in 2023. Slowdive's reunion in 2014 was described as the most "triumphant" among other first‑wave bands, and the group subsequently released two successful albums: 2017's Slowdive and 2023's Everything Is Alive.

==== Spreading influence ====
During the 2000s, some bands began to adopt the influence of shoegaze into doom metal, resulting in a distinct post-metal subgenre called "doomgaze". The founders of this style were the Angelic Process, Nadja and Jesu, who took doom metal's slow tempos and combined it with the wall-of-sound effects use of shoegaze, often in a lo-fi production style. It often particularly takes from the doom metal subgenre drone metal. During the late 2000s, the genre's second wave emerged, fronted by True Widow and Planning for Burial. Bandcamp Daily writer Zoe Camp called True Widow the genre's "most pivotal ambassadors", with their third album, Circumambulation (2013), being the most commercially successful release in the genre. On their 2011 album Tunnel Blanket, influential post-rock band This Will Destroy You departed from their usual sound, instead pursuing doomgaze. By 2024, there were 1400 albums tagged as doomgaze on Bandcamp.

Also during the 2000s, French musician Neige pioneered the fusion of shoegaze and black metal, called blackgaze, as a part to of the projects including Alcest, Amesoeurs and Lantlôs. According to Stereogum writer Michael Nelson, Alcest's 2005 EP Le Secret was "the birth of blackgaze".

2005 saw the emergence of shitgaze, a music microgenre and scene, whose name referenced shoegaze. The term was coined by Kevin DeBroux of Pink Reason to describe the music of the Midwestern rock band Psychedelic Horseshit, who he later became the bassist for. Front man Matt Whitehurst stated: I had a test of our first album that I was playing in the car [...] I was saying 'this is the shoegaze song' and he [DeBroux] said 'yeah, but it is a really shit version of shoegaze. It is totally shitgaze.' It was a joke and I put it on MySpace and then NME wrote an article and made it into a scene."

=== 2010s ===
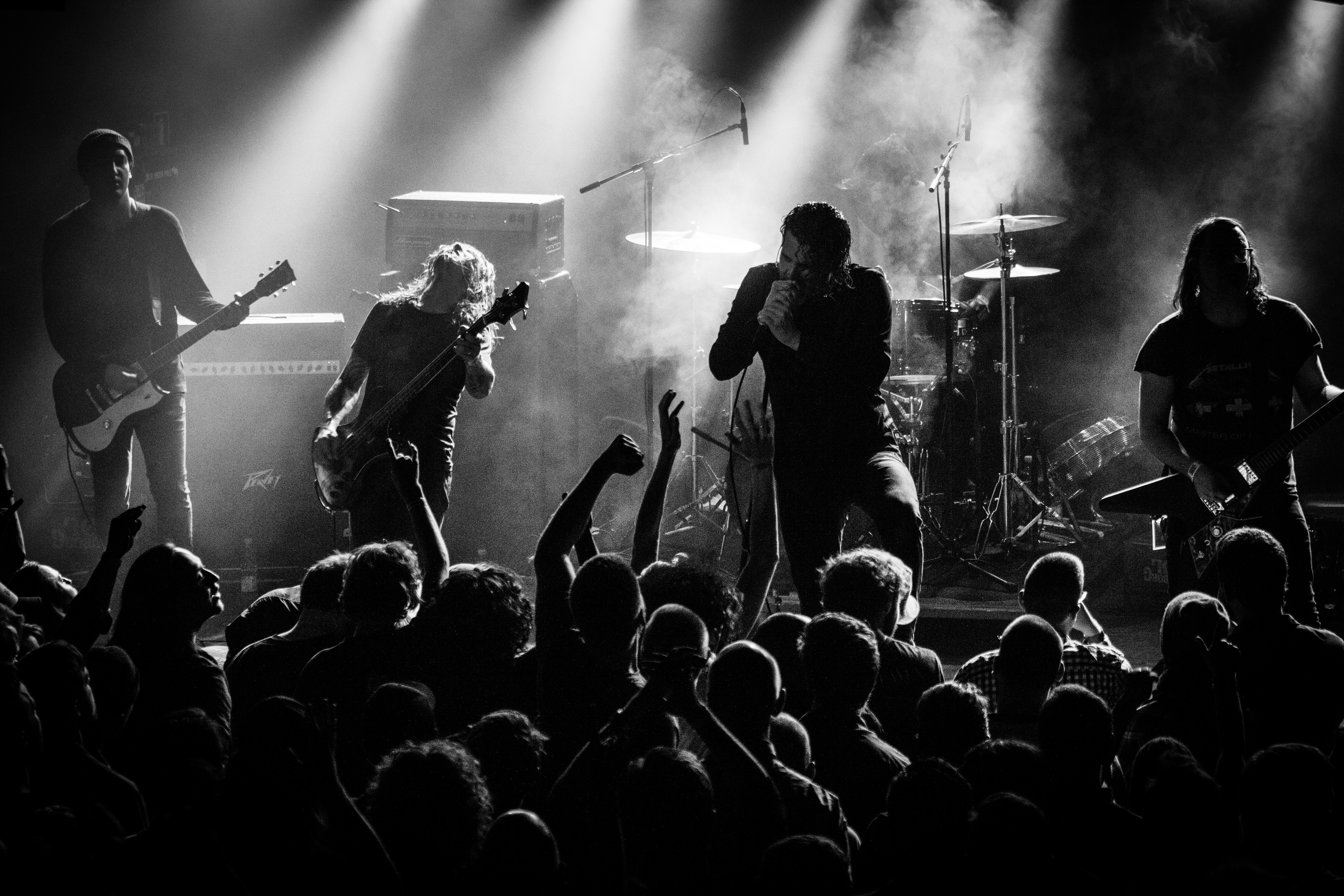
Deafheaven brought blackgaze—a fusion of black metal and shoegaze—to wider prominence with their 2013 album Sunbather.

By 2011, a separate shoegaze revival had succeeded nu gaze. Pitchfork called this the "shoegaze revival revival", crediting Whirr, Weekend, No Joy and Young Prisms as its forefront acts, while the Guardian credited DIIV, Cheatahs, Wild Nothing, Younghusband, Echo Lake, Teen and Melody's Echo Chamber. At this time, the term "shoegaze" was applied to an increasingly broad range of artists, from direct stylistic descendants such as Beach House, Ringo Deathstarr, and Spirit of the Beehive, to the blackgaze of Deafheaven. Shoegaze scenes also expanded globally, with notable groups including Resplandor (Peru), Gnoomes (Russia), Tokyo Shoegazer (Japan), Flyying Colours (Australia), Echo Ladies (Sweden), and Lucid Express (Hong Kong).

On their second album Visions of a Life (2017), Wolf Alice embraced the influence of shoegaze, with its single "Heavenward" being an entirely shoegaze song. The album won the 2018 Mercury Prize award, which Consequence named as an example of "how viable shoegaze had become in 2017".

==== Developments in the hardcore scene ====
During the 2010s, a wave of musicians from the hardcore punk scene began to play shoegaze, including Nothing, Whirr, Deafheaven, King Woman, Oathbreaker and Pity Sex. Deafheaven's 2013 album Sunbather popularised blackgaze, becoming the most critically acclaimed album of 2013 on Metacritic.

Pity Sex merged shoegaze with elements of emo, particularly its bouncy rhythms. Their debut album, Feast of Love (2013), was influential. In a 2023 article, Sacher stated that "Feast of Love imitators continue to pop up today", calling "emogaze" a "now-crowded realm". Enis called their style a "Midwestern response to" shoegaze during the emo revival. This style was also practiced by Ovlov Stove and Adventures. Around 2019, an international online wave of musical artists began to make music under the influence of Ovlov and Pity Sex, largely made up of solo artists, including Weatherday, Asian Glow, Computerwife and Hotline TNT.

===== Heavy shoegaze =====
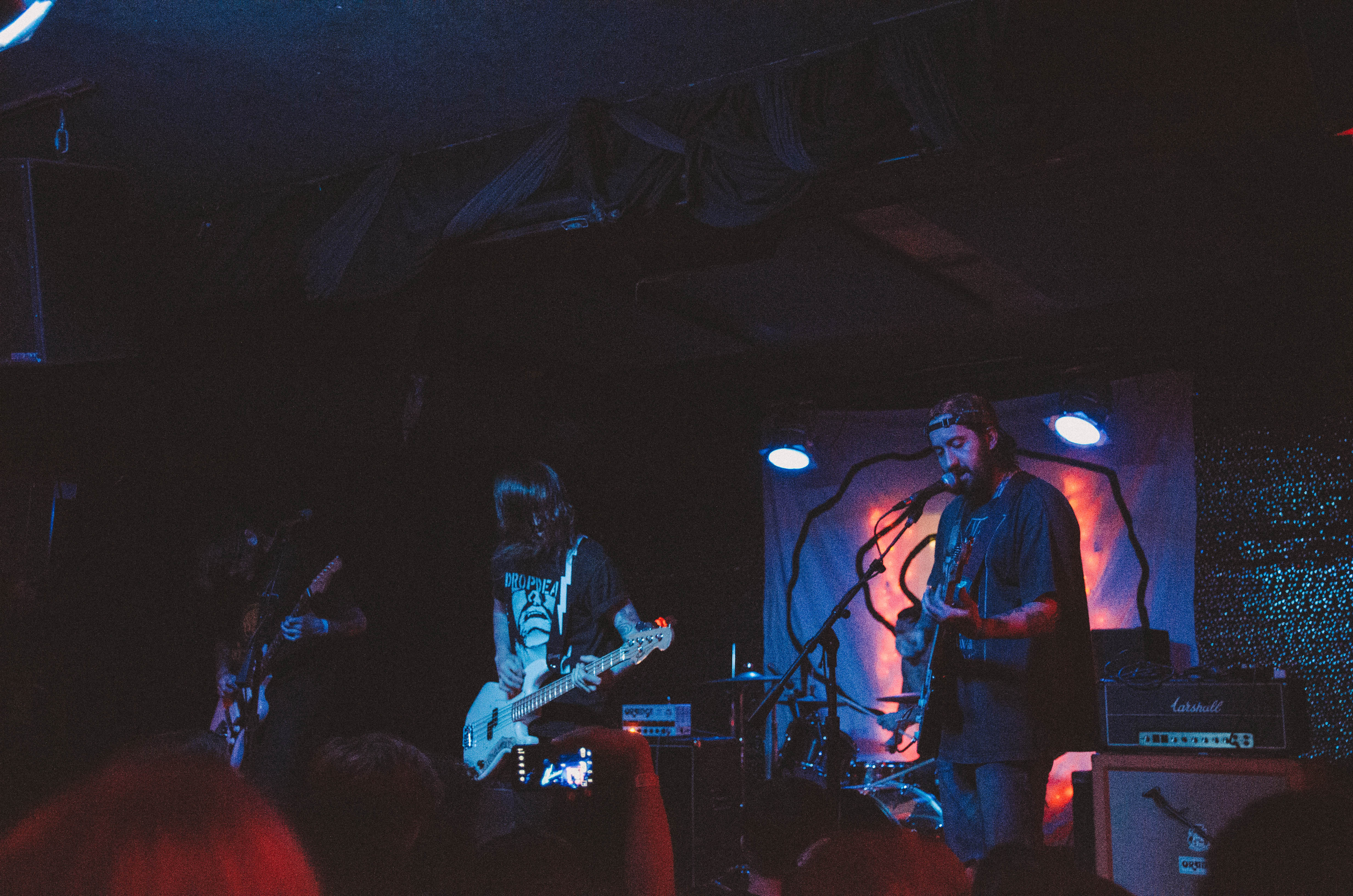
Nothing pioneered a more rhythmic, metal-inspired shoegaze sound in the 2010s

During the early 2010s, many shoegaze bands in the hardcore scene subtracted the more experimental elements of the original shoegaze sound, favouring a more mid-tempo metal-influenced rhythmic structure, simpler chords and favouring dynamics. These bands merged the shoegaze of Slowdive and Ride with the heavier but still atmospheric music of Failure, Smashing Pumpkins, Hum, Quicksand and Deftones. In an article for Stereogum, Eli Enis also noted Hum, Swervedriver, Catherine Wheel and Starflyer 59 as primary influences. Consequence called Hum's third album, You'd Prefer an Astronaut (1995), "the Forgotten Blueprint" for this sound. The most influential in this sound was Nothing, with Whirr also being a pioneer.

In a 2021 interview with Stereogum, Nothing vocalist Domenic "Nicky" Palermo stated of the style "I don't really know if any of this stuff is traditional shoegaze". Palermo expressed that with the release of Nothing's debut Guilty of Everything (2014), the band "felt awkward holding onto anything, like shoegaze or whatever", and that no separate tag was being applied to it. Patrick Lyons, the article's writer, discussed the style using the broad terms "heavy shoegaze" or "post-shoegaze". Brooklyn Vegan editor Andrew Sacher called the style "punkgaze", noting Nothing, Cloakroom, Greet Death and Holy Fawn as forefront acts. Revolver editor Eli Enis called Greet Death the "leaders of the current wave of heavy shoegaze that came in the wake of Nothing and Cloakroom", calling their second album New Hell (2019) "a modern landmark for the genre". Enis also noted Holy Fawn's Death Spells (2018) as embracing elements of blackgaze.

===== Grungegaze =====
In 2013, albums began to be released that merged the emo revival spinoff genre soft grunge with shoegaze. These included Narrow Head's Demonstration MMXIII (27 May 2013), Cloakroom's Infinity (16 June 2013) and Nevermind Me's Nevermind Me (9 September 2013). The following year, Leatherneck and Simmer established a grungegaze in Cheshire, England. Soft grunge pioneers, Title Fight's, third album, Hyperview (2015), pushed their sound more atmosopheric, in a way that bordered on shoegaze. In a 2025 retrospective article, former Revolver editor Eli Enis stated "Hyperview was dubbed a shoegaze record mostly by people who didn't know what shoegaze was beyond Nothing, Whirr, Pity Sex, and Deafheaven... but had such a marked influence on a genre it doesn't even belong to". The success of Deafheaven, Nothing and Title Fight legitimised shoegaze in the hardcore scene, causing it to become a trend. Nothing pivoted into the genre on their 2014 split album Whirr / Nothing, continued on their second album, Tired of Tomorrow (2016), with the tracks "Vertigo Flowers" and "Curse of the Sun". Narrow Head's debut album, Satisfaction (2016), was particularly influential, and around 2018, an international wave of grungegaze spread, including Modern Color, Teenage Wrist and Oversize.

===== Philly shit =====
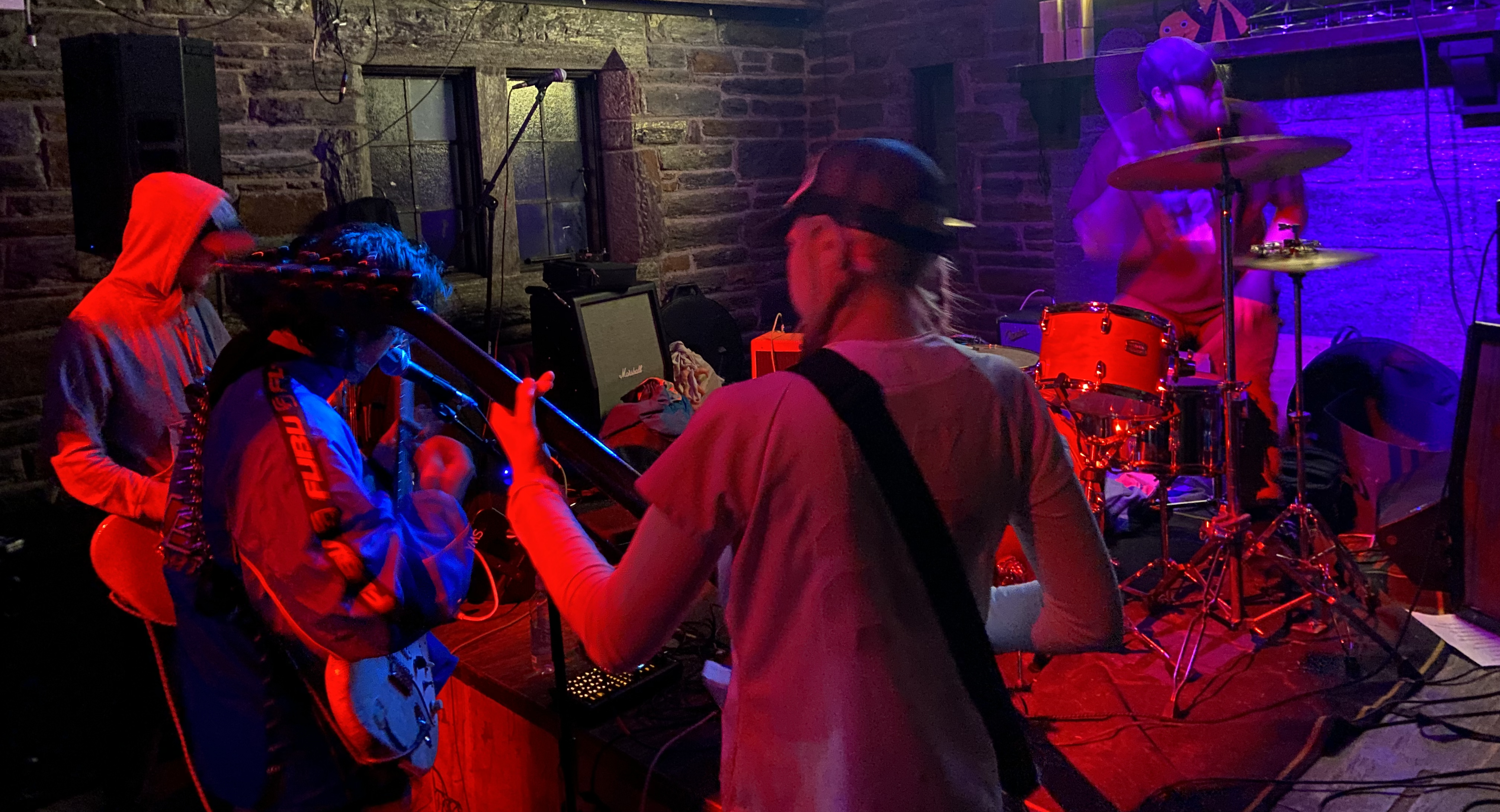
They Are Gutting a Body of Water, helped to define Philly shit, a fusion of heavy shoegaze with experimental elements such as pitch-shifted vocals, digitized synths and drum and bass

In Nothing's home of Philadelphia, many bands began to crosspollinate their influence with local indie rock groups the Spirit of the Beehive, Blue Smiley and especially the experimental style Alex G. Enis called the city "The world capital for this new wave [of shoegaze]", using the name the "Philly shit" scene, listing its forefront bands as They Are Gutting a Body of Water (TAGABOW), Full Body 2, A Country Western and Knifeplay. Bands in the scene pushed the heavy shoegaze sound into a more experimental direction, incorporating digitized synths and elements of electronic genres such as drum and bass and breakcore. In a 2023 interview, TAGABOW vocalist Douglas Dulgarian stated "You know, Alex G set the tone with pitch-shifting his voice and now he's on the auto-tune wave. There are things here that aren't happening elsewhere". Dulgarian also noted in a 2023 interview with Pittsburgh City Paper discussed how a core part of the Philly shit scene is irony, using the scene's love of Smash Mouth as an example. By 2025, The Fader writer Cady Siregar said of the Philadelphia scene "for a while [sic] that whole heavy shoegaze thing... got beat down everybody's throat".

=== 2020s ===
In early 2020, Spotify heavily pushed shoegaze and adjacent styles to the platform's listenership. This particularly effected grungegaze artists, when Fleshwater became the genre's breakout act. In 2025, Clash credited Narrow Head, Glare, Fleshwater, Leaving Time, Soul Blind and Trauma Ray as the "canon" of 2020s grungegaze, also calling Oversize, Split Chain and Bleed prominent acts Bleed's fusion of grungegaze and nu metal pioneered the nu-gaze fusion genre, which Narrow Head also pursued on their third album, Moments of Clarity. Nu-gaze became a forefront style in grungegaze in 2025, a year that saw Fleshwater, Split Chain and Bleed release nu metal-influenced albums. In December 2025, Pitchfork published its list of "the 100 Best Songs of 2025", stating that Turnstile's opening title track from their 2025 album Never Enough "erupts into a triumphant grungegaze anthem that you can easily imagine usurping the Foo Fighters' 'My Hero' as the soundtrack of choice for NFL playoffs bumper montages."

Also during the early 2020s, Ireland experienced a resurgence of shoegaze, including NewDad and Just Mustard. NewDad vocalist Julie Dawson credited Just Mustard with establishing the wave, stating in a 2023 article with Rolling Stone that "In terms of Irish bands, a lot stemmed from Just Mustard too. They were bringing back shoegaze in such a fucking cool way and were a very big inspiration to us at the start."

==== Zoomergaze: TikTok and Gen Z resurgence ====
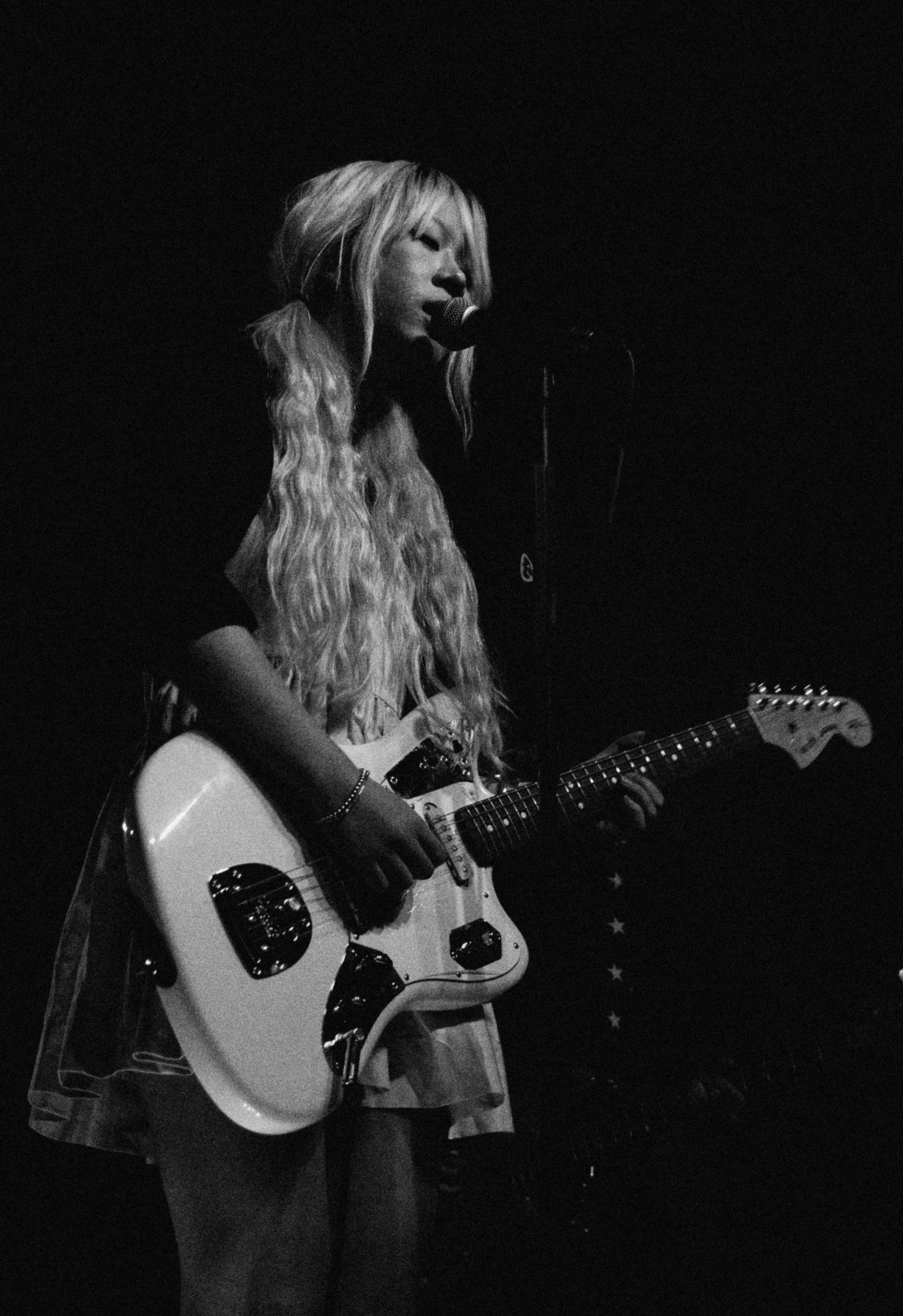
Wisp, the most commercially successful artist amongst zoomergaze, a wave of generation Z musicians merging shoegaze with digicore and hyperpop

By the early 2020s, writer Ryan Pinkard stated, "TikTok has done for Gen Z what MySpace did for millennials in the early 2000s". Stereogum credited the platform with making shoegaze "bigger than ever," while publications such as Vice noted that many teenagers were using shoegaze to soundtrack their "bleak, post-COVID world." By late 2023, Pitchfork described the year as when "The Shoegaze Revival Hit Its Stride," with the TikTok hashtag #slowdive reaching 235 million views.

In the early 2020s, a wave of practitioners of the electronic genres hyperpop and digicore began to experiment with rock elements. One major strain of this was artists who incorporated elements of shoegaze. As early as 2018, Strawberry Hospital's Grave Chimera (2018) was merging elements of shoegaze into hyperpop. In 2021, Alternative Press writer, Giedre Matulaityte credited the album, as "reimagining everything you know about shoegaze". Matulaityte also noted Fax Gang's Aethernet (2021) as merging elements of shoegaze with hyperpop and HexD. Jane Remover experimented with a similar fusion on Frailty (2021), with Quannnic following with Kenopsia (2022). Both leaned further into their shoegaze influence on their subsequent albums Census Designated (2023) and Stepdream (2023).

In an article for WhyNow, writer Harvey Solomon-Brady called this fusion zoomergaze. These musicians incorporated elements of digicore with shoegaze's atmospheric textures and grunge's energy. In particular, merging shoegaze instrumental elements alongside electronic elements including vocals that are effected by pitch shifting, autotune and formant editing, as well as glitches and entirely electronic segments. Some arts emphasize elements of electronic dance music such as drops, while others subverted physical guitars entirely, dealing only in MIDI and sampled instruments. Enis noted that "it's not a genre", instead calling it a "trend" and "generational spirit", in which artists are "drifting in and out of shoegaze... retaining the sonic elasticity of the genre they came from".

By the end of 2023, zoomergaze artists Flyingfish and Wisp had garnered viral followings on TikTok. In 2025, Dork noted that Wisp was labelled as "the face of 'zoomergaze'" and described her as a leading artist in Gen Z's shoegaze revival.

== See also ==
- Beautiful Noise (film)
- List of shoegaze bands

== Bibliography ==
- Pinkard, Ryan (3 October 2024). Shoegaze. Genre: A 33 1/3. Bloomsbury Publishing USA. ISBN 979-8-7651-0343-2.
- Provis, Victor (19 April 2018). Shoegaze: My Bloody Valentine, Slowdive, Ride Etc (in French) (EPUB ed.). Le mot et le reste. ISBN 9782360545285.
- Joynson, Vernon (2023). Discover UK Shoegaze and Dream Pop: A Music Guide to Shoegaze and Dream Pop with Artist Discographies and Biographical Information. Borderline Productions. ASIN B0CKTB3MF7. ISBN 978-1899855254.
