= Luster (album) =

Studio album by Maria Somerville
- Released: 25 April 2025
- Studio: Connemara, Ireland
- Genre: Shoegaze; folk; dream pop
- Length: 38:20
- Label: 4AD
- Producer: Jack Colleran; Henry Earnest; Diego Herrera; Brendan Jenkinson; Finn Carraher McDonald; Gabriel Schuman; Luka Seifert; Maria Somerville

Maria Somerville chronology
All My People (2019)	Luster (2025)

Singles from Luster
- 1. "Projections" Released: 30 September 2024; 2. "Garden" Released: 19 February 2025; 3. "Spring" Released: 23 April 2025

Luster is the second studio album by Irish musician Maria Somerville. It was released on 25 April 2025 by 4AD in vinyl, CD and digital formats.

== Background ==
Succeeding Somerville's 2019 debut project, All My People, Luster consists of twelve songs with a total runtime of thirty-eight minutes and twenty seconds. The album incorporates elements of shoegaze, post-punk, and ambient music, and centers on the theme of homecoming. Somerville wrote and recorded the album in Connemara.

"Projections" was released as the album's first single on 30 September 2024. It was followed by the release of the second single, "Garden", on 19 February 2025. The third single, "Spring", was released on 23 April 2025.

== Reception ==
Professional ratings
Review scores
Source	Rating
AllMusic	4/5 stars
The Guardian	4/5 stars
New Noise	4/5 stars
Hot Press	8/10 stars
The Skinny	4/5 stars
Paste	8/10

Paul Simpson of AllMusic described the album as "an accomplished, affecting work that finds strength and clarity through introspection and forgiveness." Shaad D'Souza of the Guardian wrote in his review of Luster, "these songs reveal themselves to be unusually swollen with texture and detail: harps twinkle like broken glass and baggy breakbeats reverberate widely, seemingly recorded through a bedroom wall."

Pitchfork rated the album 8.5 out of ten and stated, "The Irish musician's gossamer dream pop is both mythic and real, a wild and ancient landscape in which her own figure is just barely perceptible." New Noise remarked, "Luster's strength lies in its ability to explain the unexplainable; to emphasize a feeling only one's heart is able to comprehend—without words and without regret", and rated the album four out of five.

Hot Press assigned the album a rating of eight out of ten, calling it "a terrific album from an artist of genuine substance." The Skinny gave Luster a rating of four stars out of five, noting that "On her 4AD debut, Maria Somerville redefines dreampop, goth, shoegaze and more, stitching colour into a tapestry of blacks, whites and greys."

Caroline Nieto of Paste gave Luster a score of 8.0 out of 10, writing that "The soft, subliminal world of Maria Somerville’s Luster is one of my favorite places music has taken me this year."

== Track listing ==
All tracks are written by Maria Somerville.

Luster track listing
No.	Title	Producer(s)	Length
1.	"Réalt"	Maria Somerville	1:52
2.	"Projections"	Finn Carraher McDonald	3:40
3.	"Garden"	Henry Earnest; Diego Herrera	4:03
4.	"Corrib"	Jack Colleran; Somerville	2:01
5.	"Halo"	Somerville	3:49
6.	"Spring"	Earnest; McDonald; Gabriel Schuman; Luka Seifart	3:34
7.	"Stonefly"	Brendan Jenkinson; Somerville	3:37
8.	"Flutter"	Colleran; Schuman; Somerville	1:30
9.	"Trip"	Herrera; Somerville	2:46
10.	"Violet"	Colleran; Schuman	3:43
11.	"Up"	Colleran; Somerville	3:58
12.	"October Moon"	Earnest; Somerville	3:47
Total length:			38:20

== Personnel ==
Credits adapted from Tidal.

- Maria Somerville – vocals, guitars (all tracks); engineering (tracks 1, 4–6, 8, 9, 11, 12), programming (7, 10), synthesizer (8), bass guitar (9)
- Gabriel Schuman – mixing
- Anne Taegert – mastering
- Henry Earnest – guitars, engineering (1); acoustic guitar (2), electric guitar (3), bass guitar (6)
- Jack Colleran – engineering (1), synthesizer (8, 9), guitars (11)
- Róisín Berkeley – concert harp (1)
- Diego Herrera – drums (2), bass guitar (3, 9), guitars (11, 12)
- Finn Carraher McDonald – engineering (2, 6), vocals (4), guitars (6, 11)
- Luka Seifert – drums (6)
- Brendan Jenkinson – engineering (7, 10, 11), bass guitar (7, 10)
- Brendan Doherty – drums (7, 10, 11)
- Ian Lynch – uillean pipes (7, 10)
- Olan Monk – guitar (7)
- Diego Herrera – engineering (9, 12)

== Charts ==
Chart performance for Luster
Chart (2025)	Peak position
Scottish Albums (OCC)	35
UK Album Downloads (OCC)	36
UK Independent Albums (OCC)	31
