= Gentle Creatures =

Studio album by Tarnation
- Released: 18 September 1995
- Length: 53:57
- Language: English
- Label: 4AD
- Producers: Joshua Heller, Warren Defever, Wally Sound, Tarnation

Tarnation chronology
I’ll Give You Something to Cry About! (1993)	Gentle Creatures (1995)	Mirador (1997)

Gentle Creatures is a 1995 album by the band Tarnation (Paula Frazer, Lincoln Allen, Michelle Cernuto and Matt Wendell Sullivan). It was released on 4AD.

== Track listing ==
All tracks are written by Paula Frazer, except where noted.

No.	Title	Writer(s)	Length
1.	"Game of Broken Hearts"		3:01
2.	"Halfway to Madness"		4:39
3.	"The Well"		6:08
4.	"Big O Motel"		6:02
5.	"Tell Me It's Not So"		2:24
6.	"Two Wrongs Won't Make Things Right"		4:09
7.	"Lonely Lights"		2:03
8.	"Gentle Creatures"		1:25
9.	"Listen to the Wind"		3:46
10.	"The Hand"		2:42
11.	"Do You Fancy Me"		2:37
12.	"Yellow Birds"		3:49
13.	"Burn Again"	Michelle Cernuto	2:40
14.	"Stranger in the Mirror"	Lincoln Allen	3:58
15.	"It's Not Easy"		3:34

Bonus tracks on 1999 US CD reissue
No.	Title	Length
16.	"Sweat and Blood"	2:35
17.	"The Ring"	4:28
18.	"Spankin' Potion #5"	1:48
19.	"They Took You Away Once Again"	3:02
20.	"Rancho Carne Humana"	2:26

== Critical reception ==
Professional ratings
Review scores
Source	Rating
AllMusic	4.5/5 stars
The Encyclopedia of Popular Music	3/5 stars
Entertainment Weekly	A
Spin	7/10
The Village Voice	C
