= Jessica Bell =

Jessica Bell may refer to:

- Jessica Bell (author) (born 1981), Australian singer-songwriter, publisher, author, graphic designer
- Jessica Bell (politician), Canadian politician
