= Lisa O'Neill =

Lisa O'Neill may refer to:

- Lisa O'Neill (singer-songwriter), Irish singer-songwriter
- Lisa O'Neill (tennis), Australian tennis player
- Lisa O'Neill, singer with Sing-Sing
