= Nubus (musician) =

Paddy Mulcahy]
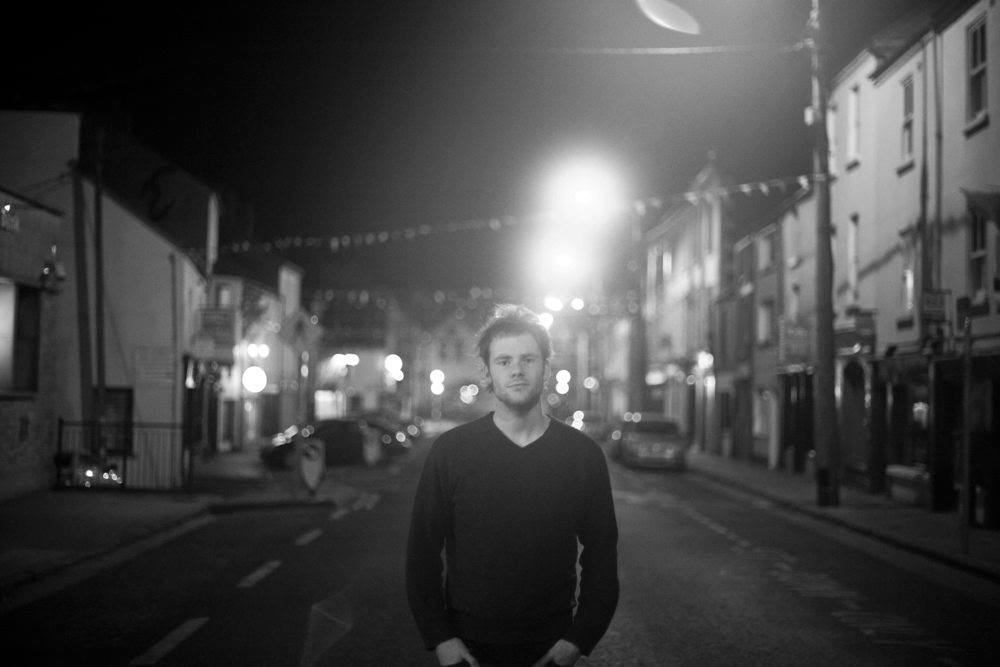
- Portrait ~James Skerritt

Background information
- Born: 3 October 1993 (age 31)
- Origin: Limerick City, Ireland
- Genres: Instrumental, Ambient, Electronic
- Labels: Phases Records, 1631 Recordings
- Website: Official website

Paddy Mulcahy (born 3 October 1993) is an Irish composer and producer based in Limerick City. Classically trained in piano from the age of 5, Paddy found his love for electronic music growing in his early teens. In 2011 he was signed to Canadian label Limbic Records.

In 2014, Paddy was invited to perform at the launch of Nils Frahm's sheet music book "EINS". Later that year the pianist/producer then performed at Body & Soul in Ireland. The following year saw Paddy play live performances at Electric Picnic and perform a support slot to Lubomyr Melnyk's first Irish performance.

Paddy was then approached by 1631 Recordings in 2016, who have since released the solo piano compositions "Tape Sketches" & TwentySix. In November 2017, the Irish composer signed to Phases Records in London who released the 5track EP "From Water".

Mulcahy released the critically acclaimed How To Disappear in November 2019.

As well as his solo work, he also composes music for video, such as documentaries, adverts and short films.

== Biography ==
Paddy Mulcahy is a composer/producer from Limerick City, Ireland.

Although classically trained in piano from the age of 5, Paddy soon sought out his own styles and his own way of learning having picked up the guitar 4 years later. By his early teens he fell in love with electronic music after discovering a number of different artists. He experimented with software and the newly digitised music world of MySpace and was signed to a record label in 2011.

During his tenure at Canadian label Limbic Records, Paddy found his support, both at home and abroad widening following a number of digital releases. In following years, the Limerick Underground Electronic music scene took off and 'nubus' became a familiar name around Limerick City, alongside his residencies at club nights such as Macronite and D.I.E.

Following his time at Limbic Records, the composer/producer began to self-release music on Bandcamp.

Following the release of his 2013 album 'Enter Morning', Paddy warmed up for Mmoths in Limerick City. In February 2014, he performed solo piano at the launch of Nils Frahm's "Sheets" in London. "The eight track album is a collection of lush dreamscape electronica that was nine months in the making."

July 2014 saw the release of "Memory Season", which took Paddy around Ireland for live shows, including Electric Picnic festival.

Now, Paddy is experimenting more with downtempo piano music, and 2015 will see the release of a new solo piano album entitled "Tape Sketches".

== Discography ==
=== Solo recordings ===
- Calling Canada (2011, Limbic Records)
- Rifo's Adventure EP (2012, Self-release)
- Enter Morning (2013, Self-release)
- Memory Season EP (2014, Self-release)
- Tape Sketches (2015, 1631 Recordings)
- The Words She Said (2016, Self-release)
- twenty six (2016, 1631 Recordings)
- From Water EP (2018, Phases Records)
- "How to Disappear" (2019)
- "Angel’s Share" (2022, XXIM Records)

=== Collaborations ===
- February 13th (2014, Pigtown Fling)

=== Remixes ===
- Fox Jaw - Siren's Call (2015)
- Cedric Vermue - Symbiosis (2018)
