= The New Division =

American synth-pop project

- Origin: Riverside, California, U.S.A.
- Genres: Synth-pop; New wave; Indie electronic; Electronic music
- Years active: 2005–present
- Labels: Division 87 Records, Progress Productions
- Members: John Kunkel
- Past members: Michael Janz; Mark Michalski; Brock Woolsey

The New Division is an American electronic music project led by musician, songwriter and producer John Kunkel. Founded in Riverside, California, in 2005, it began as a solo recording project before developing into a live band. Its music combines elements of synth-pop, new wave and electronic music.

The project released its debut full-length album, Shadows, in 2011. Subsequent albums include Together We Shine (2014), Gemini (2015), Faded Paradise (2018), Hidden Memories (2020) and Modern Life (2023).

== History ==
=== Formation and early releases ===
John Kunkel began writing new wave and synth-pop music in 2005 while attending California Baptist University in Riverside, California. Initially, The New Division was a solo recording project based in his college dormitory. Kunkel developed the project into a band over the following two years, recruiting Michael Janz, who played synthesizers, guitarist Brock Woolsey and keyboardist Mark Michalski

In a 2013 interview with the music publication blahblahblahscience, Kunkel told about the project's beginnings as a one-man undertaking that later expanded into a four-piece group. He explained that he met Janz at college, subsequently recruited Woolsey and later invited Michalski to join after meeting him at a concert.

In a 2019 interview with Rock In:flux, Kunkel described the project as having started during his freshman year of college and discussed his original intention to form an electronic band influenced by groups such as Kraftwerk.

The project's name was taken from the title of an economics book, The New Division of Labor, which Kunkel had been assigned to read in college. In a 2023 interview with Occhi Magazine, he explained that the name was not originally intended as a combination of the names Joy Division and New Order, although listeners frequently interpreted it that way. Kunkel also recalled contacting New Order musician Peter Hook through Myspace to ask his opinion of the name; Hook responded positively.

The New Division released its self-titled extended play in 2009. In November 2010, the music publication Pitchfork reviewed the single "Starfield", noting the influence of Depeche Mode on the project's earlier recordings and comparing Kunkel's vocal style to that of Ian Curtis and Bernard Sumner.

The extended play The Rookie was released in 2011. The project's debut full-length album, Shadows, followed on September 27, 2011. The Los Angeles Times described The New Division as a Los Angeles quartet and characterized the album's sound through its combination of synthesizers, drum machines and brooding vocals. The publication compared its musical approach to New Order.

=== Night Escape and Together We Shine ===
The extended play Night Escape was released in 2012. Its title track featured a collaboration with the Greek electronic music project Keep Shelly in Athens. The release continued the project's combination of electronic music and new wave influences.

The second studio album, Together We Shine, was released in March 2014. The album continued the group's electronic and new wave approach, combining synthesizer-based arrangements with guitar and dance-oriented elements.

=== Gemini and subsequent releases ===
The third studio album, Gemini, was released in 2015. It continued the project's combination of electronic production, new wave influences and indie rock elements.

In 2017, Kunkel released the EP Precision under The New Division name. The six-track release featured analog synthesizers and electronic production.

The album Faded Paradise was released on October 25, 2018, through the Swedish label Progress Productions. The album included nine tracks, among them "No Pride in Paradise", "Fader" and "One Night in Tokyo".

The album Hidden Memories was released on January 27, 2020. It was written, mixed and produced by Kunkel, with F. J. DeSanto serving as co-producer. The album combined electronic arrangements with elements of new wave, synth-pop and dance music.

The album Modern Life was released on March 22, 2023. It contains ten tracks and explores themes including isolation, technology and the experience of the COVID-19 pandemic. In an interview with METAL Magazine, Kunkel discussed the circumstances in which he began the project and the ideas behind the album.

=== 2024–2026 releases ===
In 2024, The New Division continued to release standalone tracks and electronic music. In 2025, several singles and other recordings appeared on the project's official page, including Lost Visions, Hostages, Hurricane, Argyle, and Spiral Descent. On June 26, 2026, the track "Idols", recorded in collaboration with the Podsongs project, was released. The music and production were by John Kunkel, with lyrics written by Jack Stafford.

== Musical style ==
The New Division's music has been described as synth-pop, new wave and indie electronic music. Its sound combines synthesizer-led arrangements, electronic rhythms, guitar parts and melodic vocals. The Los Angeles Times characterized the group's early music as a contemporary interpretation of 1980s-influenced new wave, while Pitchfork noted the influence of Depeche Mode and the vocal styles of Ian Curtis and Bernard Sumner.

Kunkel has cited New Order and Depeche Mode as important influences on his songwriting. He has also discussed the influence of Kraftwerk and other electronic music artists on the project's development.

== Discography ==
=== Studio albums ===
- Shadows (2011)
- Together We Shine (2014)
- Gemini (2015)
- Faded Paradise (2018)
- Hidden Memories (2020)
- Modern Life (2023)

=== EPs ===
- The New Division (2009)
- The Rookie (2011)
- Night Escape (2012)
- Precision (2017)
- Fader (2018)

== Members ==
The New Division began as a solo project led by John Kunkel and later developed into a four-piece live band. The early expanded lineup included:

- John Kunkel – vocals, songwriting, synthesizers, production
- Michael Janz – synthesizers
- Brock Woolsey – guitar
- Mark Michalski – synthesizers

Kunkel subsequently continued The New Division primarily as a solo electronic music project, working with additional musicians for live performances and recordings.
