= Sarah P. =

Greek singer

- Also known as: Sarah P., Sarah Psalti
- Born: Sarra Anna Psalti-Helbig; 14 December 1989 (age 36); Athens, Greece
- Genres: Pop, dream pop, electronica
- Occupations: Singer, songwriter, activist
- Years active: 2010–present
- Labels: EraseRestart, Amour Records / Minos EMI
- Website: sarahpofficial.com

Sarra Anna Psalti-Helbig, known as Sarah P., is a Greek singer from Athens. Her music career started in 2010, as the frontwoman of the dream pop duo Keep Shelly in Athens. Sarah P. has collaborated with artists like Sun Glitters, MMOTHS, the New Division, Sundayman, the Bilinda Butchers and many more. Her own music is minimalistic and inspired by 1990s sounds. Psalti identifies her genre as pop.

== History ==
From 2010 to early 2014, Sarah P. was the frontwoman of the Athenian dream pop duo Keep Shelly in Athens. After she left the band, she relocated to Berlin to start working on her solo debut. In December 2015, her solo debut EP Free was released via her own record label EraseRestart. In 2015, Sarah Psalti played the leading role in the award-winning short movie Finding Sigi, which was directed by Aviv Kosloff. She also appeared in Imaginary War's music video for "Made a Decision". In early 2016, Psalti released a music video for "I'd Go". Sarah P.'s solo debut full-length album Who Am I was released in May 2017 and is described as an "ode to our humanly deep need of security and love." The album's first single release, "Berlin During Winter", deals with conflict, both internal and external, tackling depression and how that can be affected by the outside world, from social media to war. The video of "Berlin During Winter" is made of archive footage of war, with Sarah P. noting "we can't undo our history, but we can learn from it and shape our future." In December 2018, Sarah P.'s second EP Maenads was released. Her second full-length album Plotting Revolutions was released in June 2020.

== Mental health advocacy ==
Since 2018, Sarah P. has been publishing the monthly mental health awareness zine EraseRestart, an Instagram zine that aims to break the stigma that surrounds mental illness. She is also a public speaker on the topic of mental health and spoke at Reeperbahn Festival 2018 about improving an artist's mental health.

== Discography ==
=== Solo ===
==== Albums ====
- Plotting Revolutions (EraseRestart, 2020)
1. "Laying Low"
2. "Athena"
3. "She"
4. "The Poem of a Clear Conscience"
5. "Bits & Bytes"
6. "Attya"
7. "An End or the End"
8. "The Truth"
9. "Beauty Queen"
10. "We Won"
- Who Am I (EraseRestart, 2017)
1. "A Letter From Urban Street"
2. "ForgetRegret"
3. "Away From Me"
4. "Instead of You"
5. "LoveStory"
6. "Summer Prince"
7. "Who Am I"
8. "Millennial Girl"
9. "To You"
10. "Berlin During Winter"

==== EPs ====
- Birdsong (EraseRestart, 2022)
1. "Birdsong"
2. "Faulty Humans"
3. "Hotel Happiness"
4. "My Father's Eyes"
- Maenads (EraseRestart, 2018)
1. "Sappho's Leap"
2. "Mneme"
3. "Lotus Eaters"
4. "Cybele's Dream"
5. "Maenads"
- Free 12" (EraseRestart, 2015)
1. "Dirty Sunday"
2. "Let It Go"
3. "Little Soul"
4. "I'd Go"
5. "Dishes"
6. "Moving On"
7. "Golden Deer" (featuring Hiras)
8. "You Wouldn't Understand"

==== Singles ====
- "I Misbehave" (Hellbig Music, 2014)
- "Teach Me How to Love" (EraseRestart, 2016)

=== As part of Keep Shelly in Athens ===
- In Love with Dusk 12" (Forest Family Records, 2010)
- Campus Martius 12" (Planet Mu, 2011)
- Our Own Dream 12" (Forest Family Records, 2011)
- Keep Shelly in Athens CS (Sixteen Tambourines Records, 2011)
- Late Night Later Night CS (split with Disclosure) (Loud and Quiet Cassettes, 2011)
- Hauntin' Me 7" (Transparent, 2011)
- In Love with Dusk / Our Own Dream (2012) (LP on Forest Family Records, CD on Plancha/Art Union)
- At Home (2013) (LP on Cascine, CD on Plancha/Art Union)

=== Special appearances ===
- MMOTHS – "Heart" (from EP) (Street Quality Entertainment, 2012)
- The New Division – "Night Escape" (from Night Escape EP) (Division 87, 2012)
- The Bilinda Butchers – Golden House (from "Heaven") (Inner Orchid Tapes/Fastcut Records, 2014)
- Sundayman – "On the Run" (Inner Ear Records/Crash Symbols, 2014)
- Plastic Flowers – "Ghosts" (from "Evergreen") (Inhouse Music Records, 2015)
- Sun Glitters – Galaxy EP (Hellbig Music, 2015)
- Hiras – So Real (The Sound of Everything, 2016)
- Tareq – Crossbones (from "Prints") (tareqdisco, 2020)

=== Remixes ===
- Sun Glitters – "Clouds in Your Eyes" (Sarah P. Rework) (2015)

=== Compilation appearances ===
- "Running Out of You" (DannielRadall Remix) appears on Beko_Amdiscs1 (BEKODSL & AMDISCS, 2010)
- "Song to Cheer You Up" appears on DYVNZMBR (DZ TAPES, 2011)
- "Running Out of You" (Memory Tapes Remix) appears on Memory Tapes – Player Piano (Something in Construction, 2011)
- "Hauntin' Me" appears on Weekly Magic Tape No. 9 (Magic, 2011)
- "Our Own Dream" appears on Weekly Magic Tape No. 37 (Magic, 2011)
- "In Love with Dusk" appears on Keep It Yours Records Compilation Vol.1 (Keep It Yours Records, 2011)
- "Just Like Honey" appears on Just Like Honey (Just Like Honey, 2011)
- "DIY" (Sasha Involv3r Remix) appears on Sasha Involv3r (Ministry of Sound, 2013)
- "Maenads" appears on Heard Well Collection Vol. 7 (Heard Well, 2019)
- "Love Profusion" appears on Grecospectiva Madonna (Amour Records, 2021)
