= Mirador (Tarnation album) =

Studio album by Tarnation
- Released: 7 April 1997
- Length: 50:03
- Language: English
- Label: 4AD, Reprise
- Producer: David Katznelson and Tarnation

Tarnation chronology
| Gentle Creatures (1995) | Mirador (1997) |

Singles from Mirador
- 1. "There's Someone" Released: 20 January 1997; 2. "Your Thoughts and Mine" Released: 24 February 1997

Professional ratings
Review scores
| Source | Rating |
|---|---|
| AllMusic | 4.5/5 stars |
| NME | 5/10 |

Mirador is a 1997 album by the band Tarnation, which was led by Paula Frazer. It was released on 4AD in the UK and Europe, and on Reprise/Warner Bros. Records in the US. The American edition features a different album cover from the European version.

== Track listing ==
All tracks are written by Paula Frazer, except where noted.

| No. | Title | Writer(s) | Length |
|---|---|---|---|
| 1. | "An Awful Shade of Blue" | | 2:54 |
| 2. | "Wait" | | 3:26 |
| 3. | "A Place Where I Know" | | 3:42 |
| 4. | "Is She Lonesome Now?" | | 1:58 |
| 5. | "Your Thoughts and Mine" | | 3:58 |
| 6. | "Christine" | | 5:44 |
| 7. | "Destiny" | | 3:50 |
| 8. | "There's Someone" | | 2:58 |
| 9. | "Like a Ghost" | | 5:06 |
| 10. | "Idly" | | 3:46 |
| 11. | "Little Black Egg" | Michael S. Stone | 3:03 |
| 12. | "You'll Understand" | | 2:49 |
| 13. | "The Well Sequel" (hidden track) | | 5:35 |
| 14. | "Sailor's Lament" (hidden track) | | 1:31 |
