= YHWH Nailgun =

American rock band

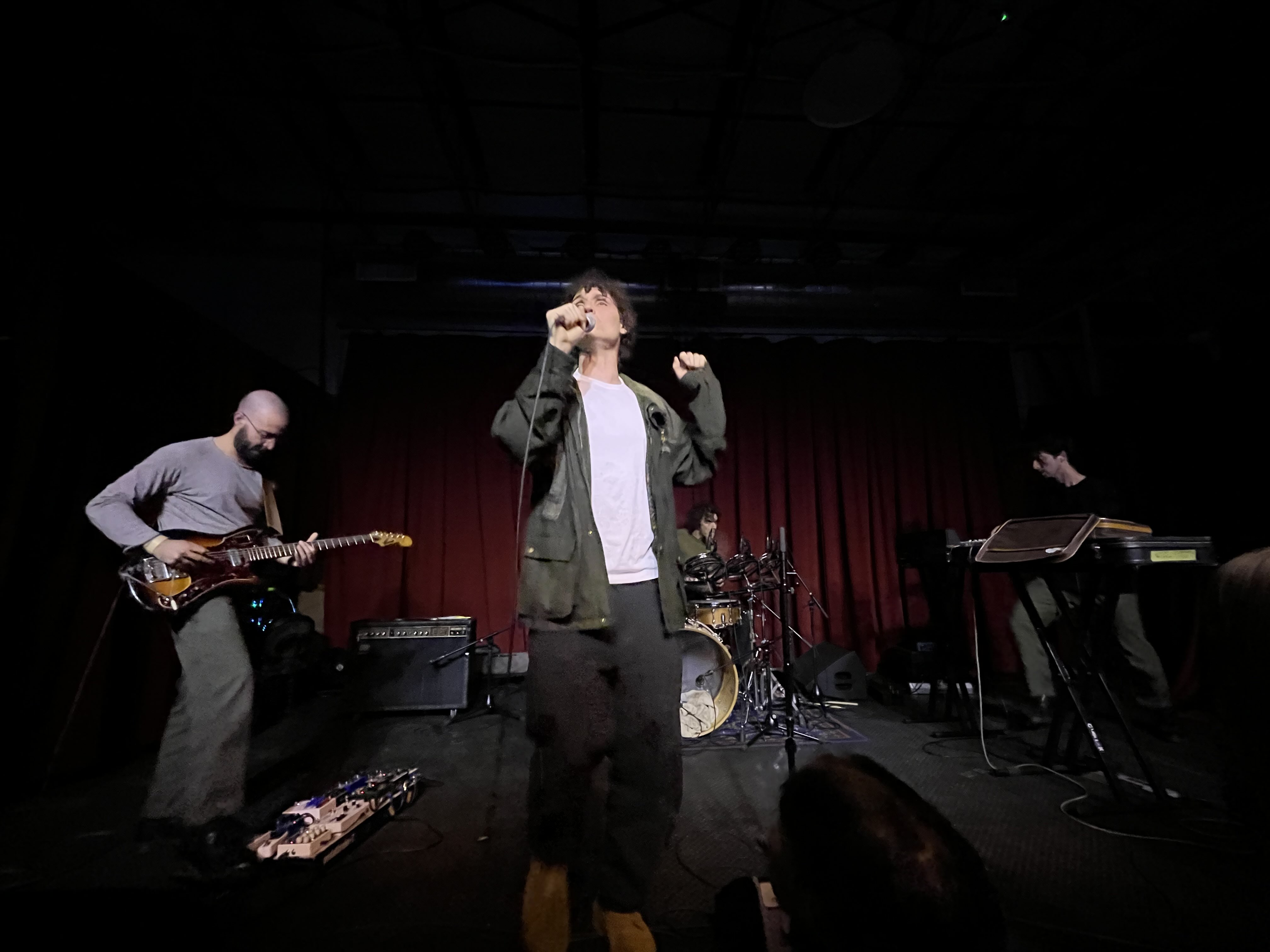
- YHWH Nailgun performing in 2025

Background information
- Origin: Philadelphia, United States
- Genres: Experimental rock; noise rock; post-punk; post-rock
- Years active: 2020–present
- Labels: AD 93; 4AD
- Members: Zack Borzone; Saguiv Rosenstock; Jack Tobias; Sam Pickard
- Website: https://yhwhnailgun.com/

YHWH Nailgun (pronounced Yahweh Nailgun (Note: YHWH is the name of God in the Hebrew Bible; see Tetragrammaton for further information.)) is an American experimental rock band formed in 2020, known for their abrasive sound that blends elements of punk, noise, and electronic music. VICE has called them "the last good band left in New York". The quartet consists of vocalist Zack Borzone, drummer Sam Pickard, guitarist Saguiv Rosenstock, and synthesist Jack Tobias. Their debut album, 45 Pounds, released in 2025 on the London label AD 93, received critical acclaim for its innovative approach to post-rock, post-punk and noise rock.

== History ==
YHWH Nailgun originated during the COVID-19 lockdowns in Philadelphia, where roommates Zack Borzone and Sam Pickard began collaborating musically. They later relocated to New York City, expanding the lineup by adding Jack Tobias on synthesizers and Saguiv Rosenstock on guitar. Rosenstock initially joined as a producer for their debut EP, YHWH Nailgun (2022), but eventually became a full-time member. The band quickly gained attention in the underground music scene, performing at DIY venues and festivals, including SXSW.

The band released their debut full-length in 2025, 45 Pounds, which was met with critical acclaim. The group signed to British record label 4AD in May 2026 and released their second album Magazine on June 11, 2026.

== Musical style ==
YHWH Nailgun's music is characterized by its fusion of dissonant motifs, polyrhythmic patterns, and explosive noise elements. Drummer Sam Pickard's use of rototoms and complex rhythms has been highlighted as a defining feature of their sound. Vocalist Zack Borzone delivers lyrics with intense, guttural expressions, drawing comparisons to the raw energy of no-wave pioneers. The band's influences span a wide range, including modern hip-hop, reggae, techno, and avant-garde rock.

== Members ==
=== Current members ===
- Zack Borzone – vocals (2020–present)
- Sam Pickard – drums (2020–present)
- Jack Tobias – synthesizer, electronics (2020–present)
- Saguiv Rosenstock – guitar (2022–present)

== Discography ==
=== Studio albums ===
Album	Year	Label
45 Pounds	2025	AD 93
Magazine	2026	4AD

=== Extended plays ===
EPs	Year	Label
YHWH Nailgun	2022	Self-released
No Midwife and I Wingflap	2022	Ramp Local

=== Singles ===
Single	Year	Label
"White Sleepy"	2020	Self-released
"Mallet"	2020	Self-released
"Look at Me, I'm a Rainer"	2022	Ramp Local
"Castrato Raw (Fullback)"	2023	AD 93
"Tear Pusher"	2023	AD 93
"Penetrator"	2024	AD 93
"Sickle Walk"	2025	AD 93
"Animal Death Already Breathing"	2025	AD 93

=== Remixes ===
Title	Artist	Year	Label
"Leaving (YHWH Nailgun Version)"	LEYA	2025	NNA Tapes
"Violet (NHWH Nailgun Remix)"	Maria Somerville	2026	4AD
