= Young & Sick =

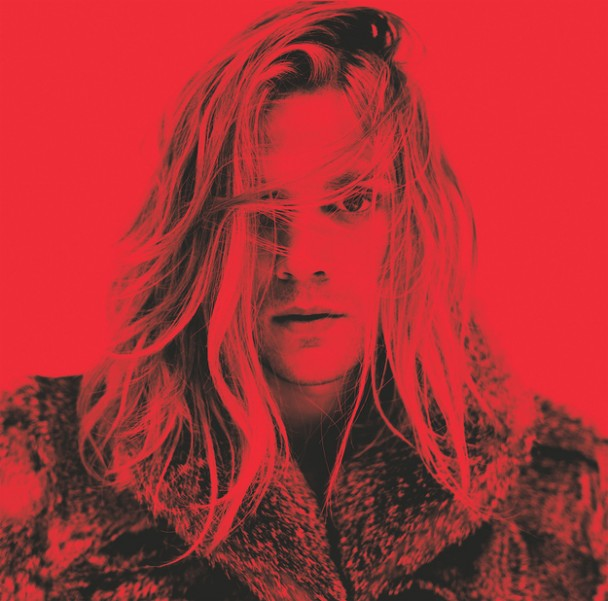
- Young & Sick in 2014

Background information
- Also known as: Japayork
- Born: Nick van Hofwegen
- Origin: Los Angeles, California, U.S. New York City, U.S.
- Genre: R&B
- Years active: 2011–present
- Labels: Harvest; Capitol; Neon Gold
- Website: youngandsick.com

Young & Sick is an American music and art project by Dutch artist Nick van Hofwegen. He is responsible for the project's musical composition, production, performance, and artwork. Young & Sick has released music with Neon Gold Records and B3Sci Records and was previously signed to Harvest Records. He has created artwork for Foster the People, The Velvet Teen, Maroon 5, Robin Thicke, Mikky Ekko, T. Mills, Andy Dick, Jerry Stiller, L.A. Salami and others. In 2014, Zane Lowe and BBC Radio 1 called Young & Sick the "Next Hype" and the project was named Stereogum's "Band to Watch."

In April 2014, Young & Sick released his first self-titled album. The record was first available as a vinyl LP with 50 unique pieces of art inserted into records at random. After a musical hiatus, he released two EPs in 2018 entitled Ojai and No Static. In 2019, Young & Sick released an EP entitled Size of Relief as a joint project from Neon Gold Record and B3Sci Records. In 2020, he released an LP entitled Demo Club.

== Artwork ==
=== Album artwork ===
==== Foster the People ====
In 2011, Young & Sick designed the album cover for Foster the People’s album Torches. The artwork was later expanded and used extensively as a backdrop in live shows, on merchandise, and on the band's website. The characters depicted in the artwork came to be an integral part of the band's identity.

Young & Sick went on to create the visual identity for Foster the People's 2014 second album Supermodel, which features an abstract surreal illustration of a model surrounded by a crowd of people and paparazzi armed with cameras, who take photographs as she poses on a pedestal. A mural of the artwork for the album was painted over the facade of a building located on 539 S Los Angeles Street in Los Angeles, California. It became the largest mural ever constructed on the West Coast of the United States.

In 2018, Young & Sick designed the cover art for the Foster the People singles "Worst Nites." He created the cover art for the single "Style," which was released on March 22, 2019. The "Style" artwork is also featured on merchandise for the band.

==== Maroon 5 and Robin Thicke ====
In 2012, Young & Sick drew the album cover for Maroon 5’s album Overexposed. Jimmy Fallon "loved" the artwork, even creating an improv song about the art entitled "kill the boogers" with Adam Levine after learning that the drawing first featured mucus coming from the nose. Young & Sick's artwork done for Maroon 5 was featured by Apple Inc. during the September 2012 launch of the iPhone 5. Young & Sick was also retained by recording artist Robin Thicke to design the cover of Thicke's 2013 album Blurred Lines. The album was the 4th consecutive album designed by Young & Sick to reach No. 1 on the Billboard Charts.

==== Additional artwork ====
American singer-songwriter Mikky Ekko, rapper T. Mills, and producer Skrillex also feature artwork completed by Young & Sick.

=== Branding ===
In 2013, Young & Sick designed the branding and artwork for the New Orleans–based music and art festival BUKU. Van Hofwegen went on to further develop his designs, expanding the festivals identity to create a Buku experience, continuing to design the branding for the festival in 2014, 2015, 2016, 2017, and 2018.

In June 2015, van Hofwegen was commissioned to reimagine the classic Pringles can for an artistic campaign the brand did alongside Fergie of the Black Eyed Peas.

Later in 2015, The Fader and Coors Light retained van Hofwegen to create artwork for a three event concert series in LA featuring Kali Uchis, HEALTH, and Shlohmo. van Hofwegen created three unique posters for the event which were used during a six-week wheat paste campaign around Los Angeles.

In 2017, Young & Sick created the poster for Phoenix-based 100% non-profit music festival M3F. In 2018, Van Hofwegen went on to design the poster and translate it into the physical branding for festival.

=== Fine art ===
In October 2013, Katz's Deli featured Young & Sick's artwork in the grand opening of their new art space, "The Space." Young & Sick's piece was purchased by actor and comedian Jerry Stiller, father of Ben Stiller.

In coordination with the release of Foster the People's 2014 album Supermodel, Young & Sick was commissioned to design a mural to be painted on the side of a building in downtown LA spanning 148 ft X 126 ft. The mural was the largest mural constructed on the West Coast of the United States. A time lapse of the mural's creation was used as the lead music video for the band's first single off Supermodel, "Coming of Age".

Young & Sick presented his first solo gallery show at LA's FF-1051 Gallery in August 2018.

== Fashion ==
In late 2012, Young & Sick's first fashion designs were featured by Urban Outfitters.

In February 2013, Young & Sick was commissioned by fashion retailer Rag & Bone to paint a mural on their store in SoHo, New York City.

In January 2015, MeUndies, an online retailer of specializing in fashion underwear, released a new pattern entitled "faces" designed by Young & Sick.

In 2018, in conjunction with the release of his Ojai EP, Van Hofwegen designed a set of sneakers with Threadless featuring his artwork from the album.

== Music ==
Young & Sick self-released the first single "House of Spirits" in October 2012.

In November 2012, a collaboration between Young & Sick and Irish electronic artist MMOTHS was featured in The Fader in their exclusive mixes.

In March 2013 Young & Sick turned down six-figure recording contracts from major music labels to release their second single "Continuum" via Tor "The Underweb". The song and method of release was featured by outlets such as Forbes, Business Insider, and Pitchfork.

The project has been featured in The Wall Street Journal, The New York Times, Rolling Stone, Pitchfork, Vice Magazine, The Fader, Amoeba Music, Blare Magazine and others.

In late 2013, Young & Sick signed with Harvest Records (Capitol Records).

In 2015, Young & Sick teamed up with JD Samson (Le Tigre) to create a side project called SHARER.

In January 2018, Young & Sick released the EP Ojai on B3Sci Records. The title track off of the EP, "Ojai," released in November 2018, and its album art, also created by Van Hofwegen, was featured by Apple in an Apple Watch ad. Van Hofwegen additionally directed, edited, and produced a video for "Ojai" of himself live-illustrating all of the lyrics to the song. A limited edition 7" three-color splatter vinyl of Ojai was released by B3Sci, featuring original artwork from Van Hofwegen on the cover, album sleeve, and folded poster. The follow-up single to "Ojai" was a cover of the Fleetwood Mac song "Dreams."^{[46]} In January 2018, Young & Sick premiered the single "The Road," as a lead-up to this January 26, 2018 release of the Ojai EP on Complex.

On August 17, 2018, Young & Sick released the No Static EP on B3Sci. The EP was premiered by Flaunt Magazine featuring an exclusive interview with Van Hofwegen. The follow-up to the EP's title single "No Static" was "Letting Go Of Giving Up" which premiered by Variety.^{[43]} The EP also featured a cover of T-Pain's "Up Down (Do This All Day)."

In 2018, Young & Sick was asked to appear on Neon Gold's 10th anniversary album NGX: Ten Years of Neon Gold, for which he covered Passion Pit's hit song "Sleepyhead." On the 2nd of April 2026, this cover was used to wake up the crew of Artemis II. It was the first wakeup song of the mission. "After a brief rest period, the crew was awakened to monitor the Orion spacecraft’s systems through the burn. The ground team woke them at 7:06 a.m. EDT with the song “Sleepyhead” by Young and Sick," says NASA.

In 2019, Young & Sick released an EP titled Size of Relief as a joint project from Neon Gold Record and B3Sci Record. The debut single off the forthcoming EP "Bitter End" went on to be No. 1 on KCRW's Morning Becomes Eclectic Top 10 list and Indie Shuffle's Best Songs Of January 2019 list. The follow-up single "Jet Black Heart" was featured on KCRW's Best New Music list, where Marion Hodges said it was "beautifully constructed as a driving piece of synth pop." The single "Ohh My Ghosts," an electronic track about sleepless nights, was premiered by The Fader, who called it "addictive." Young & Sick released the single "Queen of the Valley" on March 22, 2019. The song "Ohh My Ghosts" from the EP is featured on the Forza Horizon 5 soundtrack under Horizon Pulse "where players can find Forza Horizon 5's electronic and pop music."

In the Fall of 2025, Young & Sick released the Lost at Sea EP with B3Sci Records. The first single off of the EP, "Feed It Love," was featured as Today's Top Tune by KCRW on November 18, 2025. With the debut of the EP, Young & Sick released a Limited-Edition Lost at Sea Flexi Disc along with an art print featuring the artwork he created for the album. The flexi disc teased the Y&S remix of "Feed It Love," which Young & Sick released on December 12, 2025.

=== Songwriting ===
In 2014, van Hofwegen co-wrote the song "Caught In The Middle" for Charli XCX's album "Sucker" alongside Benny Blanco.

A long-time fan of the French group Telepopmusik, first releasing a cover of the group's track "Breathe" in 2014, he is featured and credited as a writer on the group's tracks "Dreams," "Circles," "Connection," and "Ghost of Love" on the 2020 album Everybody Breaks The Line.

=== Festivals ===
In early 2014, it was announced Young & Sick would perform at the 2014 Coachella Valley Music and Arts Festival. He later performed at festivals including ACL Music Festival in Austin, Texas and Corona Capital Festival in Mexico City, Mexico.

In March 2014, Young & Sick did a series of showcases at Austin's South by Southwest including a show exclusively for dogs at the Austin Pets Alive! shelter with Ryan Hemsworth and Mahaut Mondino.

Young & Sick also showcased at other well-known events during SXSW including Fader Fort, HypeHotel, Another Planet, Noise Pop, and opened for Foster the People at the main outdoor stage for SXSW at Butler Park.

== Discography ==
- Young & Sick (2014)
- Ojai EP (2018)
- No Static EP (2018)
- It's a Storm EP (2019)
- Size of Relief (2019)
- Demo Club (2020)
- Covers EP (2020)
- Brother (2021)
- Lost at Sea EP (2025)
