= Maria Somerville =

Irish musician

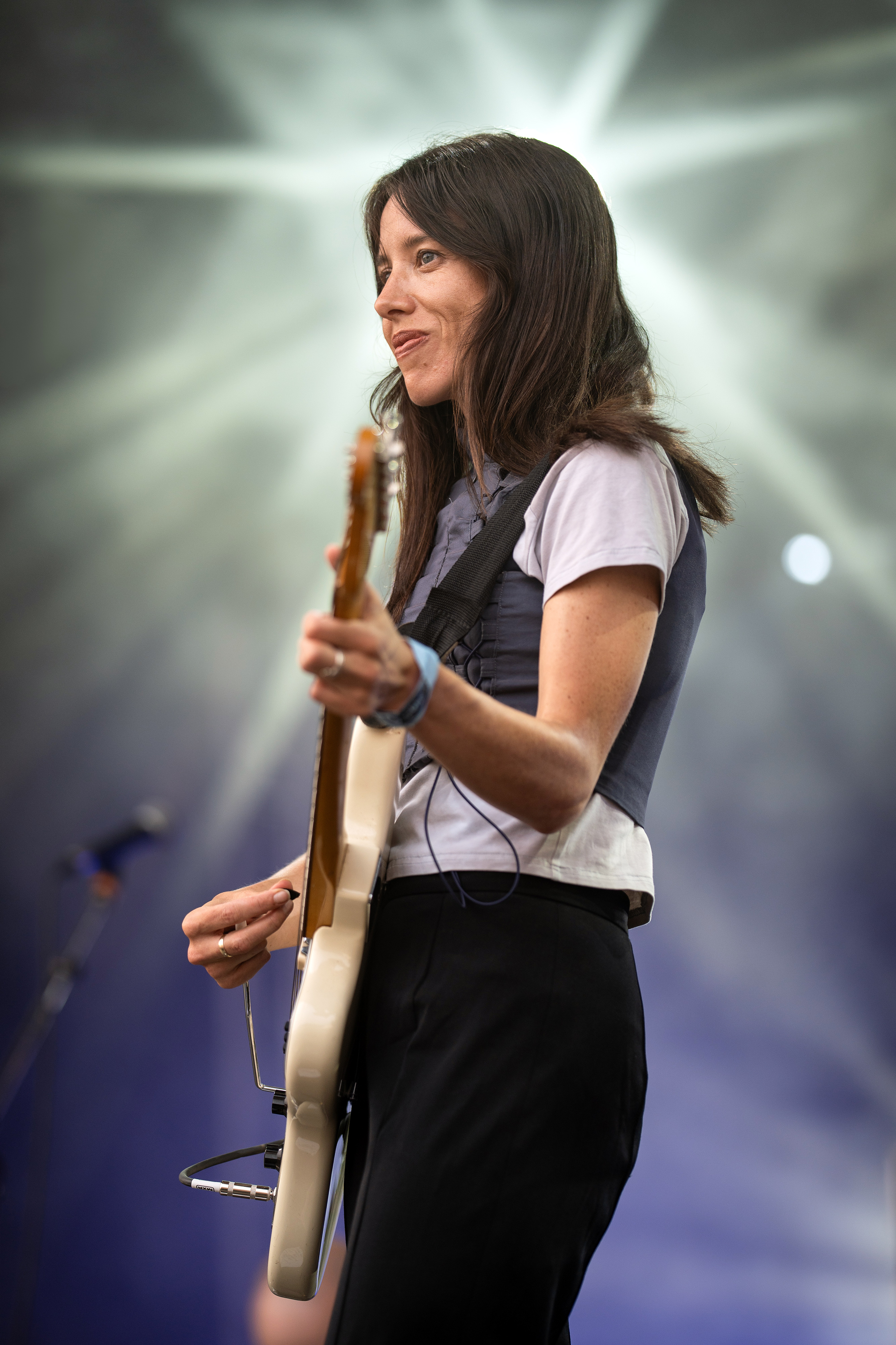
- Maria Somerville performing at La Route du Rock 2025.

Background information
- Origin: Connemara, Ireland
- Genres: Shoegaze, folk music, dream pop
- Years active: 2018–present
- Labels: 4AD

Maria Somerville is an Irish musician and producer.

== Biography ==
Somerville is from Connemara in County Galway, Ireland. She began playing music at a young age, taking up singing through her father and uncles, and learning how to play guitar from her older brother.

In 2013, Somerville was first noticed after she uploaded some songs to the website BreakingTunes. She was invited to play at Electric Picnic, which exposed her further and got her invited to play at other venues.

Somerville self-released her debut album The Man Called Stone In My Shoe in 2018, followed by her second album All My People in 2019.

In 2019, Somerville began hosting shows on NTS Radio. In 2021, she began hosting The Early Bird Show, drawing on Irish folk forms alongside ambient music, classic pop, dream pop, experimental music, spoken word, and field recordings.

In 2024, Somerville was featured on the RIP Swirl track "Bizarre" on his album Perfectly Blue.

On 25 April 2025, Somerville released her third album Luster through 4AD. The album incorporates elements of shoegaze, post-punk, and ambient music, centering on the theme of homecoming to her native Connemara after leaving to attend college in Dublin for sound engineering. Written in a house on the banks of Lough Corrib, the album was received with widespread critical acclaim, including an 8.5/10 and a "Best New Music" designation from Pitchfork.

As well as her native Connemara and the community she grew up in, musically Somerville has cited fellow Irishwomen Katie Kim, Róisín Berkley, and Sinéad O’Connor, Grouper, My Bloody Valentine, and Patrick Gallagher as influences on her work.

== Discography ==
=== Albums ===
- The Man Called Stone In My Shoe (self-released, 2018)
- All My People (self-released, 2019)
- Luster (4AD, 2025)

=== Singles ===
- Eyes Don't Say It (self-released, 2018)
- Kinky Love (Nancy Sinatra cover, 4AD, 2021)
- Seabird (4AD, 2018)
- Projections (4AD, 2024)
