= Ojai (EP) =

EP by Young & Sick
- Released: 2018
- Genre: PBR&B
- Length: 17:00
- Language: English
- Label: B3SCI Records

Young & Sick chronology
Young & Sick (2014)	Ojai (2018)	No Static (2018)

Ojai is a 2018 EP by Young & Sick. It was his second release, following his self-titled album in 2014.

== Songs ==
In an interview, Young & Sick described the EP as showcasing "a nice range of what the next phase of Young & Sick will be."

On the songwriting process for the EP's first track and titular single, "Ojai," Young & Sick described his experience staying in a hotel in Ojai, California:

I was staying at a hotel there called The Rancho. I just had a few drinks and I was in the sun, and I just let a very apparent feeling hit myself, hit me. I got to make a song about taking too much on your plate and how that affects you and how you can have, like, a micro-meltdown because you’ve put too much on yourself.

== Release ==
The EP was released in 2018, along with a limited-edition yellow vinyl record with red and black splatter designed by Young & Sick containing the first two songs on the EP. Young & Sick expressed his pride in the design, calling it "one of the wackiest, in-depth pieces of art I’ve made." Along with the record, Young & Sick also released a number of visual designs for the release of the EP, including three pairs of sneakers and a hoodie.

== Critical reception ==
The EP was well received by critics. Regarding the EP's cover of Fleetwood Mac's "Dreams," online music publication Earmilk noted that the cover proves that Young & Sick "can take on the classics," and sounds "[d]renched in California sunshine with a dash of twinkly lo-fi indie sensibility." Earmilk also reviewed the single "Ojai," calling it a "near-perfect pop song." On the single "The Road," Complex said that Young & Sick "uses the raw and track to further encapsulate his recent travels throughout small town America." The EP ends off with a "gorgeously pared-down solo piano version of EP single 'Ojai,'" as described by BroadwayWorld.

== Track listing ==
No.	Title	Writer(s)	Length
1.	"Ojai"	Nick van Hofwegen	4:13
2.	"The Road"	Nick van Hofwegen	3:52
3.	"Dreams" (Fleetwood Mac cover)	Stevie Nicks	4:47
4.	"Ojai (Solo Piano)"	Nick van Hofwegen	4:08
Total length:			17:00
