= Paula Frazer =

American singer-songwriter

- Born: April 24, 1963 (age 63)
- Origin: Georgia, Arkansas
- Genres: Alternative country; post-punk
- Instruments: Guitar, vocals
- Years active: 1981–present
- Labels: Reprise/Warner Bros. Records; 4AD Records; Birdman Records

Paula A. Frazer (born April 24, 1963) is an American singer-songwriter. She grew up in Georgia and Arkansas and moved to San Francisco in 1981. Her music is frequently described as melancholic alternative country, but with an eclectic mix of folk, blues and pop, among other genres. She first came to notice by fronting the band Tarnation in the 1990s and has appeared on recordings and in concert with many bands and solo artists including Cornershop, Sean Lennon, Frightwig, Tindersticks, the Czars, and Handsome Boy Modeling School.

Before forming Tarnation, Frazer played with numerous SF bands, such as Cloiter, Virginia Dare, Frightwig, Trial, and Pleasant Day. Tarnation MK1 featured Brandan Kearney, owner of the SF NufSed label. Kearney didn't stay in the band for long, but he gave Frazer the chance to release Tarnation's debut. That first Tarnation record was called I'll Give You Something To Cry About, and initially appeared in an edition of only 1,000 copies. In 1995, 4AD released Gentle Creatures, an album featuring several songs off the previous album. Warren Defever (His Name Is Alive) helped in the production. Mirador appeared in 1997. One year later, Frazer dropped the Tarnation name and continued as a solo artist. In 2006 Frazer revived the Tarnation name and released her seventh record, Now It's Time in March 2007 under the name of Paula Frazer and Tarnation.

Frazer is also a professional weaver. She was one of the temporary vocalists of Faith No More sometime in between 1983 and 1984. At the time the band only played shows, and often asked new people to step in. Frazer was asked due to her acquaintance with Roddy Bottum.

== Discography ==
As Tarnation

- I'll Give You Something To Cry About (1993; Nuf Sed Records)
- Gentle Creatures (1995; 4AD Records)
- Mirador (1997; Reprise/Warner Bros. Records)

As Paula Frazer

- Indoor Universe (2001; Birdman Records)
- A Place Where I Know (2003; Birdman Records)
- Leave the Sad Things Behind (2005; Birdman Records)

As Paula Frazer and Tarnation

- Now It's Time (2007; Birdman Records)
- In Some Time (EP) (2014; MRG Recordings)
- What Is And Was (2017; New High Recordings)
