= Young & Sick (album) =

Studio album by Young & Sick
- Released: April 8, 2014
- Recorded: 2014
- Genre: PBR&B
- Length: 49:59
- Label: Harvest
- Producer: Nick Van Hofwegen

Young & Sick chronology
Young & Sick (2014)	Ojai (2018)

Singles from Young & Sick
- 1. "Glass"; 2. "Heartache Fetish"

Young & Sick is the debut self-titled album by artist Young & Sick (Nick Van Hofwegen).

== Release ==
"Young & Sick" was first announced alongside the premiere of the album's first single "Glass" on February 18, 2014. On March 25, the album's second single "Heartache Fetish" was released. The accompanying music video was released May 21.

Young & Sick was officially released April 8, 2014 via Harvest Records. The album was first available as an exclusive stream on Hype Machine.

== Critical reception ==
Young & Sick received universal acclaim from music critics and blogs. AllMusic summarized, stating the album "delivered with so much style and graceful soul that it leaps ahead of the pack to become something of a minor classic of the form."

Pitchfork Media stated "Young & Sick is a remarkably polished debut, with each song boasting careful, painstaking arrangements and adept uses of space. It's charming, undeniable music that bops its way out onto the dance floor with relaxed charm, and it shimmers with the seductive murmur of a lounge staple." Earmilk added the album was "the stuff of music lovers' dreams."

== Track listing ==
- All tracks written/produced/recorded by Nick Van Hofwegen.

No.	Title	Writer(s)	Length
1.	"Mangrove"	Nick Van Hofwegen	4:28
2.	"Heartache Fetish"	Nick Van Hofwegen	3:09
3.	"Ghost of a Chance"	Nick Van Hofwegen	3:45
4.	"Counting Raindrops"	Nick Van Hofwegen	3:49
5.	"Feel Pain"	Nick Van Hofwegen	5:18
6.	"Gloom"	Nick Van Hofwegen	4:10
7.	"Glass"	Nick Van Hofwegen	3:18
8.	"Valium"	Nick Van Hofwegen	4:35
9.	"Nowhere"	Nick Van Hofwegen	3:29
10.	"Twentysomething"	Nick Van Hofwegen	3:40
Total length:			49:59

== Personnel ==
Credits for Young & Sick adapted from AllMusic and from the album liner notes.

- Nick Van Hofwegen — Music, Art, Publishing
- Idiosyncrasy Gallery - Recorded At
- Sam Vloemans - Trumpets on "Gloom"
- Aaron Saltzman — Management
- Max Braun — Booking
- Brent Underwood — Central Bank of Street Cred
- Clayton Blaha — Publicity
- Nicky Stein - Legal
- JB Mondino - Photograph
- Caleb Morairty - A&R
- Ryan Del Vecchio - A&R Administration
