= Tarnation (band) =

American band

- Tarnation (1997)

Background information
- Origin: San Francisco, California, U.S.
- Genres: Alternative country; gothic country
- Years active: 1992–1997
- Labels: 4AD; Reprise/Warner Bros. Records; Nuf Said Records
- Members: Paula Frazer, Jacob Aranda, Sam Berman, David Cuetter
- Past members: Brandan Kearney, Brent Johnson, Michelle Cernuto, Lincoln Allen, Matt Sullivan, Alex Oropeza, Bill Cuevas, Joe Byrnes, Jamie Meagan, John Wischmann

Tarnation is an American alternative country band formed by Paula Frazer in late 1992, primarily recording on the 4AD label.

== History ==
Tarnation originally consisted of Frazer on vocals and guitar. In 1993, she was soon joined by Brandan Kearney on lap steel guitar and Brent Johnson on guitar and vocals. Next, musicians Michelle Cernuto, Lincoln Allen and Matt Sullivan joined the band. This lineup then recorded the album I'll Give You Something to Cry About! in 1993 on Nuf Sed Records (Kearney's label).

Tarnation signed with 4AD Records and released Gentle Creatures in 1995. The album includes seven re-worked songs from I'll Give You Something to Cry About as well as new material. Cernuto, Allen and Sullivan left the band shortly after its release in September 1995.

Frazer reformed Tarnation with a new lineup including Alex Oropeza on guitar, Bill Cuevas on bass and lap steel guitar, and Joe Byrnes on drums. Jamie Meagan joined on bass in 1996, in time to take part in the recording sessions for the band's final album, Mirador.

The band split up after the release of Mirador in 1997. Frazer continues touring and recording under her own name and as Paula Frazer and Tarnation. Oropeza, Cuevas, and Byrnes continued with their own band, Broken Horse. Allen continues writing and recording music with the San Francisco – based band Scratchland.

== Discography ==
- I'll Give You Something to Cry About! (album, Nuf Sed Records, 1993)
- Gentle Creatures (album, 4AD, 1995)
- Mirador (album, Reprise/Warner Bros. Records (US & Canada), 1997)
- Now It's Time (album, Birdman Records, 2007)
- What Is and Was (album, New High Recordings, 2017)
