= 45 Pounds =

Studio album by YHWH Nailgun
- Released: March 21, 2025
- Genre: Post-punk; punk funk; experimental rock
- Length: 21:04
- Label: AD 93

YHWH Nailgun chronology
No Midwife and I Wingflap (2022)	45 Pounds (2025)	Magazine (2026)

Singles from 45 Pounds
- 1. "Castrato Raw (Fullback)" Released: October 10, 2023; 2. "Tear Pusher" Released: November 7, 2023; 3. "Penetrator" Released: November 14, 2024; 4. "Sickle Walk" Released: February 5, 2025; 5. "Animal Death Already Breathing" Released: March 5, 2025

45 Pounds is the debut studio album by American band YHWH Nailgun. It was released on March 21, 2025, on AD 93.

== Background ==
Following the release of two EPs in 2022, 45 Pounds marks YHWH Nailgun's first full-length release and their first release on London-based record label AD 93.

The band recorded the album in a studio at a goat farm in Upstate New York. Lead singer Zack Borzone cited poets Paul Celan and Walt Whitman as influences for the album's lyrics.

In the lead-up to the album's release, Pitchfork named the single "Sickle Walk" a Best New Track, describing it as "an 86-second blast of freak-rock". The band announced a North American tour following the album's release, starting in Philadelphia, where the band originated, and ending in Brooklyn, where the band is now based.

== Critical reception ==
Professional ratings
Aggregate scores
Source	Rating
Metacritic	85/100
Review scores
Source	Rating
Beats Per Minute	83%
Clash	9/10
Far Out	4/5 stars
The Guardian	4/5 stars
Paste	8.0/10
Pitchfork	8.5/10

45 Pounds was met with critical acclaim upon its release. At Metacritic, the album received an aggregate score of 85 based on 7 reviews, indicating "universal acclaim".

In a four-star review of the album for The Guardian, Ben Beaumont-Thomas pointed to the band's "genuinely fresh and singular sound" that evolves the styles of New York City post-punk and punk funk, writing that "their MVP is drummer Sam Pickard, whose playing is less backbeat than a series of fills repeated again and again: he sends you toppling into each new bar but also keeps you just about upright," and adding that "on top is astounding singer Zack Borzone, whose lyrics can’t really be made out, but they're not the point anyway".

In an 8.5/10 review for Pitchfork, Jeremy D. Larson highlighted the album's prominent use of rototoms, writing that what the band "does so exceptionally well in just 21 minutes is recontextualize not just the rototoms, but a world of experimental and avant-garde music into a sleek, four-person machine that operates with almost zero entropy." Reviewer Matt Mitchell summarized the album as a "grotesque, eccentric reverie of feels-bad-man doom" in an 8.0/10 review for Paste, writing that "the clanging, angular guitars and breathing, vivacious synths capture and hold your attention even in horror."

John Amen of Beats Per Minute gave the album a "recommended" score, writing, "Though 45 Pounds unabashedly evokes bleakness, Nailgun are too ambitious and talented to settle for generic nihilism. The band operate more like music majors who have absorbed punk, hardcore, and horrorcore, as well as classical and jazz elements, dropping out in their second or third year with diverse leanings and heightened aspirations re: revolutionizing the club scene".

== Track listing ==
No.	Title	Length
1.	"Penetrator"	2:09
2.	"Castrato Raw (Fullback)"	2:06
3.	"Pain Fountain"	1:31
4.	"Animal Death Already Breathing"	2:39
5.	"Ultra Shade (Beat My Blood Dog Down)"	1:44
6.	"Iron Feet"	1:45
7.	"Tear Pusher"	3:07
8.	"Sickle Walk"	1:26
9.	"Blackout"	2:58
10.	"Changer"	1:34
Total length:		21:04

== Personnel ==
- Zack Borzone – vocals
- Saguiv Rosenstock – guitar
- Jack Tobias – synthesizers, electronics
- Sam Pickard – drums
