= Trial (San Francisco Bay Area band) =

American post-punk band

Trial was an American post-punk band formed by Desmond Shea and John Borruso in Berkeley, California in 1982. In addition to Shea (bass) and Borruso (vocals), the initial lineup included Jason Ellish (drums) and Rob Noxious (guitar). Trial's raw sound and brooding, often political lyrics aligned them with a handful of local bands collectively described as "peace punk," including Crucifix, PLH (Peace, Love & Happiness), Treason, Atrocity, Sleeping Dogs, and A State of Mind, among others. Trial's performances, recordings, and printed materials frequently addressed themes of human rights, non-violence, and nuclear disarmament.

Trial released three recordings over five years of existence, beginning with 1983's cassette Live at the On Broadway. Later that year the group, now with Rip Reed on guitar, issued a self-titled 7" single on Crucifix's Freak Records. The DIY packaging, like Trial's prolific flyer output, had a recognizable xerox collage aesthetic.

In 1983 Paula Frazer replaced Reed on guitar as the band built a following with performances throughout the San Francisco Bay Area.

In 1984 Trial moved towards self-produced, immersive events at non-music venues such as warehouses and art spaces. One-off compositions, 16mm film loops, and slide projections marked this phase, with events like Trial of the Subconscious at San Francisco's Co-Lab and Non-Fiction Reality Effect at New Langton Arts. The band's stark, mid-tempo, garage sound grew gradually darker and more atmospheric, introducing elements of industrial and experimental music. The period saw personnel changes as well, with Shea moving to guitar, Cyrnai joining on bass, and Christopher Douglas replacing Ellish on drums. The resultant songs defined Trial's later years and were documented in their full-length album, Moments of Collapse.

Moments of Collapse was recorded by Naut Humon at the Rhythm & Noise Compound in San Francisco between 1985 and 1986. Called "dark, poetic, and proficient" by Maximum Rocknroll, the LP was released in 1986 on Trial's Communications Syndicate label, manufactured and distributed by Rough Trade. In addition to Shea, Borruso, Douglas, and Cyrnai, the group was joined on the recording by Alaric for the song "Unshackled in the Garden."

Trial, with Humon's band Rhythm & Noise, toured the US from 1986 to 1987, supporting both Moments of Collapse and Rhythm & Noise's recent Chasms Accord LP. Trial's tour lineup featured bassist Andrew Bosch of PLH. On their return Trial disbanded after recording a final demonstration cassette, The Fragmentary, in early 1987.

== Personnel ==
- Desmond Shea (guitar, bass)
- John Borruso (vocals)
- Jason Ellish (drums)
- Rob Noxious (guitar)
- Rip Reed (guitar)
- Paula Frazer (guitar, vocals)
- Cyrnai (bass)
- Aleph Kali (drums)
- Christopher Douglas (drums)
- Alaric (source tape arrangements)
- Andrew Bosch (bass)

== Discography ==
- Live at the On Broadway cassette, Wasteland Productions, 1983
- Self-titled 7", Freak Records, 1983
- Moments of Collapse LP, Communications Syndicate, 1986
- The Fragmentary demonstration cassette, Communications Syndicate, 1987
- Lest We Forget compilation cassette, BBT Tapes, 1991
