= Sing-Sing (band) =

English indie pop supergroup

- Origin: London, England
- Genres: Indie pop, dream pop
- Years active: 1997–2007
- Labels: Aerial, Sanctuary, Poptones, Manifesto
- Past members: Lisa O'Neill; Emma Anderson

Sing-Sing were an English indie pop/dream pop supergroup formed in 1997 in London, comprising vocalist Lisa O'Neill (who had previously worked with Locust, Mad Professor, and Kid Loco) and guitarist/vocalist Emma Anderson (formerly of Lush). They worked with a variety of musicians to create a sound which nodded to 1960s girl groups, electronica and folk. They disbanded in 2007.

== History ==
Lisa O'Neill and Emma Anderson met via a mutual friend in mid-1997, and in early 1998 record their first demo as Sing-Sing, with Justin Welch of Elastica on drums. A second demo prompted Simon Raymonde and Robin Guthrie to release "Feels Like Summer" as a single on their Bella Union label in October 1998.

After having a track on a split single in 1999, they started their own label, Aerial, through which they released their next two singles, "I'll Be" and a re-recorded "Feels Like Summer", in 2000. They signed with Alan McGee's Poptones label for the release of their debut album, The Joy of Sing-Sing, in October 2001. It was described as a "divine first album" by AllMusic and a "strong debut album" by PopMatters. Pitchfork Media gave it a 7.4 rating, with Nitsuh Abebe calling it a "tight, interesting, and great-sounding pop record". CMJ New Music Monthly called it "a perfect soundtrack to a lazy afternoon in the countryside". It was released in the US in 2002 by Manifesto Records.

They toured the United States twice in 2002 taking in both SXSW in Austin and CMJ in New York. To raise funds to record a second album they sold the Madame Sing-Sing EP via their website. Second album Sing-Sing and I followed in 2005, and was again well received by critics. Caroline Sullivan, reviewing it for The Guardian gave it 3 stars out of 5, while PopMatters gave it 6 out of 10.

Both the band's albums were produced by O'Neill's former colleague in Locust, Mark Van Hoen, but they also collaborated with the Mad Professor (remixed "I'll Be" in a lovers rock style), Robin Guthrie of Cocteau Twins, cellist and string-arranger Audrey Riley, Poppy Gonzalez, former pianist Mojave 3, Tim Keegan (Departure Lounge vocalist) and 4AD artist Vinny Miller.

Live musicians for touring included Michael Scrivens a.k.a. Shifty (bass), Poppy Gonzalez (piano, keys, percussion, backing vocals), Miguel Morland (drums 1998–2000), Jenny Jones (trumpet and keyboards), Darren Groucutt (drums 2000–2002), and Dominic del Torto (guitarist and backing vocalist 2005–2006).

At the end of December 2007, they announced via their mailing list and website that they had decided to disband.

=== Post disbanding ===
Wrake (née O'Neill) is a graphic designer, and sings with the band Lost Remnants.

Anderson took part in the Lush reformation 2015-16 and released her debut solo album Pearlies on 20 October 2023 on the Sonic Cathedral label, having made videos for the singles "Bend the Round", "Clusters" and "The Presence" prior.

== Discography ==
=== Albums ===
- The Joy of Sing-Sing (2001), Poptones
- Sing-Sing and I (2005), Aerial/Reincarnate – CD includes video for "Lover"

=== Singles and EPs ===
- "Feels Like Summer" (1998), Bella Union - UK Indie Singles #26
- "I Can See You" (1999), Fierce Panda – a double A-side with Linoleum - UK Indie Singles #26 - UK Singles #96
- "I'll Be"/"Western"/"I'll Be ('Dub You Can Love Mix')" (2000), Aerial/Sanctuary - UK Indie Singles #38
- "Feels Like Summer" (remix) (2000), Aerial/Sanctuary
- "Tegan" (2001), Poptones
- "Panda Eyes" (2001), Elefant
- Madame Sing-Sing EP (2004), Aerial
- "Lover" (2005), Aerial
- "Come, Sing Me a Song"/"Mister Darkness" (2006), Aerial

=== Other appearances ===
- "Feels Like Summer" appears on the 1999 Polish compilation Now To Jest Twoja Muzyka 06 (Now That's What I Call Music 06) (Universal Music Polska 1999)
- "Feels Like Summer" appears in the 2005 film Shelf Life directed by Tamar Halpern.
- "Lover" was used in Episode 4 ("Fog") of the 2006 US TV series Saved.
- "Come, Sing Me A Song" appears in Season 2, Episode 20 ("Band Aid Covers The Bullet Hole") of the TV Series, Grey's Anatomy. It then appeared on Volume 2 of the Grey's Anatomy soundtrack as an iTunes exclusive.
- "A Modern Girl" was used by The Body Shop in their 2006 'Make Me Fabulous' make-up campaign (online and in-store).
- "Sunbathing" appeared on Never Lose That Feeling Volume 2 on Club AC30 Records in 2005. This was a cover of the Lush song, written by Emma in 1990.
- "When I Was Made" appears in the 2007 movie, Numb.
- "Come, Sing Me A Song" appears in the 2012 film Jeremy Fink and the Meaning of Life, written and directed by Tamar Halpern.
