= Vinny Miller =

British singer-songwriter

- Also known as: Starry Smooth Hound
- Born: 1969 (age 56–57)
- Origin: Dorset, England
- Genres: Alternative rock, lo-fi, experimental
- Instruments: Vocals, guitar
- Years active: 1998–present
- Label: 4AD
- Website: Vinny Miller on 4AD.com

Vinny Miller (born 1969 in Dorset, England) is an English singer-songwriter and record producer, once signed to the 4AD label.

== Biography ==
He first came to musical prominence in 1998 as a 4AD signing under the moniker Starry Smooth Hound, releasing a track co-produced by Guy Fixsen (of Too Pure band Laika) on the label sampler Anakin.

Two singles, "Pigpen" and "Breaking Out of Your Arms," preceded Miller's debut studio album On The Block in April 2004. Two tracks included drumming contributions from Clive Deamer, whose previous credits included recordings with Portishead and Roni Size. Miller states "Pigpen" was first demoed using the opening drum riff from the Led Zeppelin classic recording of blues original When The Levee Breaks.

He has provided guest vocals on tracks by Mark Van Hoen and Sing Sing, toured the US briefly with John Darnielle and Peter Hughes from American act The Mountain Goats, and recorded radio sessions with Mary Anne Hobbs for the BBC Radio 1 show Breezeblock, Gideon Coe for BBC 6Music, John Kennedy for XFM, and for British Council's The Selector. He has also collaborated with Steve Cobby, one-half of electronica acts Fila Brazillia and The Cutler.

Of his prolonged silences Miller says: "I create when conditions are favourable. That could be soon, or it might be never."

== Discography ==
=== Studio albums ===
- On the Block (19 April 2004)
  - 4AD, CAD 2404 CD
  1. "The Yes/No Game" – 1:27
  2. "Breaking Out of Your Arms" – 3:38
  3. "Roll Complete" – 3:32
  4. "Pigpen" – 4:05
  5. "Cromagno" – 0:36
  6. "Bagged and Tagged" – 4:58
  7. "Afternoon Nod" – 3:33
  8. "Bogeyeater" – 3:59
  9. "Millalude" – 0:40
  10. "Hogbreath Busts a Move" – 2:54
  11. "Alioth" – 5:33
  12. "On the Block" – 5:32

=== Singles ===
- "Pigpen" (AD 2305, 8 September 2003)
  1. "Pigpen" – 4:03
  2. "The Yes/No Game" – 1:22
  3. "Bagged and Tagged" – 4:59
- "Breaking Out of Your Arms" (22 March 2004)
  - CD (BAD 2413 CD)
  1. "Breaking Out of Your Arms" – 3:38
  2. "Tanglebot" – 2:49
  3. "Hastener" (Demo) – 2:18
  - 7" vinyl (AD 2413)
  1. "Breaking Out of Your Arms" – 3:38
  2. "Hastener" (Demo) – 2:18

=== Appearances on compilations ===
- "Dreamt U in a Dream" (as Starry Smooth Hound)
  - On the 4AD sampler Anakin (TAD 8001 CD, 26 January 1998)
- "Coco Crush (edit)"(as Starry Smooth Hound)
  - On the 4AD sampler Dust Distorts (1998)
