= MMOTHS =

Irish musician

- Born: Jack Colleran; May 1993 (age 33); Newbridge, County Kildare, Ireland
- Genres: Electronic, ambient, chillout, indietronic
- Occupation: Musician
- Years active: 2010–present
- Label: SQE Music

Jack Colleran (born May 1993), known professionally as MMOTHS, is an Irish electronic musician.

== Biography ==
Colleran was born in Newbridge, County Kildare. He has played piano since he was five years old. He played in several bands while in school and, in 2011, began making music on his laptop using a demo version of Ableton Live. He released the demo on SoundCloud a week later under the stage name MMOTHS.

Having released a number of tracks on SoundCloud, MMOTHS was approached by and then signed to Los Angeles music label SQE Music. SQE released his self-titled debut EP in March 2012, which featured guest vocals from Superhumanoids and Keep Shelly in Athens. The EP was described by This Is Fake DIY as "an utterly beautiful blend of electronics that are somehow crafted to evolve with an aching sense of soulful intimacy".

MMOTHS performed at the South by Southwest festival in April 2012. In August, he supported At the Drive-In at the O2 Academy in Brixton, and he has also opened for Aphex Twin.

MMOTHS' EP entitled Diaries was released 5 March 2013 and features vocals by Holly Miranda and Young & Sick.

== Discography ==
MMOTHS discography
- Studio albums: 1
- Extended plays: 2

=== Studio albums ===
Year	Album details	Peak chart positions	
Year	Album details	IRL	UK
2016	Luneworks: Released: 11 March 2016; Label: Because; Formats: CD, download	88	—
"—" denotes a title that did not chart.

=== Extended plays ===
Year	Album details
2012	MMOTHS: Released: March 2012; Label: SQE
2013	Diaries: Released: March 2013; Label: SQE

== Compilation appearances ==
- Annie Mac Presents 2012 (2012), Island: "Over You"
