= RIP Swirl =

- Also known as: Luka Seifert
- Born: Hamburg, Germany
- Genres: Trip hop, dream pop, indie rock

Luka Seifert, known as RIP Swirl, is a German DJ, musician, and music producer. Born and raised in Hamburg, Germany. He is based in Berlin.

== Discography ==
=== Albums ===
- Perfectly Blue (2024)
- Blurry (Public Possession, 2022)

=== Singles ===
- 9Teen90 (2019)
