= 4AD =

British record label

- Parent company: Beggars Group
- Founded: 12 November 1979; 47 years ago
- Founder: Ivo Watts-Russell; Peter Kent
- Distributor: Beggars Group
- Genre: Alternative rock; post-punk; dream pop; gothic rock; darkwave; electronic
- Country of origin: United Kingdom
- Location: London
- Official website: 4ad.com

4AD is a British record label owned by Beggars Group. It was founded in London under the name Axis Records by Ivo Watts-Russell and Peter Kent in November 1979 as an imprint of Beggars Banquet Records. The name was changed to 4AD in early 1980, shortly after the release of the label's first four singles. Later that year, Watts-Russell and Kent purchased the label from Beggars Banquet to become an independent record label, and Kent sold his share to Watts-Russell a year later.

The label gained prominence in the 1980s for releasing albums from alternative rock, post-punk, gothic rock, and dream pop artists, such as Bauhaus, Cocteau Twins, Modern English, Dead Can Dance, Clan of Xymox, Pixies, Throwing Muses, and Watts-Russell's own musical project This Mortal Coil, a music collective, in collaboration with John Fryer. In 1987, the label scored an international hit with the dance music single "Pump Up the Volume" by the one-off project M|A|R|R|S. 4AD continued to have success in the 1990s and 2000s, with releases from the Breeders, Lush, Belly, Red House Painters, Camera Obscura, TV on the Radio, St. Vincent, Cass McCombs and Bon Iver. As of March 2026, the label's current roster includes acts such as Dry Cleaning, the National, Deerhunter, Big Thief, Aldous Harding, U.S. Girls, and Future Islands.

In 1999, Watts-Russell sold 4AD back to the Beggars Group. The label's history was detailed by Martin Aston in the book Facing The Other Way, released in 2013.

== History ==
Ivo Watts-Russell and Peter Kent, employees of the Beggars Banquet record store and label, founded Axis Records (named after the Jimi Hendrix album Axis: Bold as Love) on 12 November 1979 as a property of Beggars, run by the two of them. After the first four Axis singles in early 1980, it became apparent that the name Axis was already being used by another music company and the name was changed to 4AD, an abbreviation of the word "forward". Other names which they had considered included 1980AD, 4WD and 1984. An initial idea was that the label would be a "testing ground" for Beggars Banquet; successful acts would graduate up to Beggars Banquet after a year at 4AD. The only band to follow this path were Bauhaus who signed to Beggars Banquet in late 1980 before Watts-Russell and Kent purchased the label outright. Watts-Russel and Kent were the sole owners for about a year. Kent sold his share to Watts-Russell at the end of 1981, and started a new Beggars Banquet subsidiary, Situation Two Records. Watts-Russell would maintain ownership of the label, and act as its president, until the late 1990s.

Watts-Russell invited the graphic designer Vaughan Oliver and the photographer Nigel Grierson to create sleeve art for the label, and as a result, 4AD acquired a visually distinctive identity. Its artists, such as Cocteau Twins and Dead Can Dance, developed cult followings in the mid-1980s. Describing the label's mid-1980s image, the critic Dorian Lynskey wrote that "If Factory felt like an art gallery-cum-nightclub and Rough Trade a left-leaning college campus, then 4AD was a church."

4AD continued to evolve during the late 1980s and, after signing Throwing Muses and Pixies, the label increasingly concentrated on underground American rock music. In 1983, 4AD had a minor hit in America with the Modern English single "I Melt With You". In 1987, 4AD had a UK number-one hit with the collaged "Pump up the Volume" by M|A|R|R|S (licensed to 4th & B'Way/Island Records in the US).

In the 1990s, 4AD established an office in Los Angeles and had success with bands such as The Breeders, Belly, Red House Painters, Unrest and His Name Is Alive, as well as solo material by Frank Black and Kristin Hersh.

The label's deal with Warner Bros. Records in the United States in 1992 would start the beginning of a new phase in 4AD history. New signings that year included American underground acts Kendra Smith, Tarnation, Air Miami and The Amps. The following year Watts-Russell started a sub-label, Guernica, which would release records by Unrest, That Dog, and Bettie Serveert.

In 1999, Watts-Russell sold his share in 4AD back to the Beggars Group (as it had by then become), but the label continued to release music and add new artists to its roster. Simon Halliday took control of the label at the end of 2007. Immediate successes were Bon Iver's critically lauded debut For Emma, Forever Ago (CAD 2809) and Dear Science by Brooklyn's TV on the Radio (CAD 2821). In 2008, the Beggars Group re-aligned itself so that several labels, including Beggars Banquet itself, were folded up on to the 4AD label. Bands including The National were moved to 4AD as a part of this merger. In 2009, the label released, amongst others, St. Vincent's second record Actor (CAD 2919) and Camera Obscura's My Maudlin Career. The following year, 4AD saw the release of The National's High Violet and acclaimed albums from Ariel Pink's Haunted Graffiti, Blonde Redhead and Deerhunter.

In the next three years, 4AD oversaw new releases from Scott Walker, Bon Iver, Iron & Wine, and Tune-Yards, whilst also expanded its roster with a number of beats and electronic acts in the shape of acts including Purity Ring and Grimes, with the latter releasing one of the best received albums of 2012. Additional signings to the label include bEEdEEgEE, of Gang Gang Dance, Lo-Fang, and British producer SOHN. At the start of 2014, the label also announced the additions of Future Islands and Merchandise, followed by D.D Dumbo.

In 2015, the label released critically lauded albums by Deerhunter and Grimes, amongst others. The following year, the label and The National landed their first UK No. 1 record with Sleep Well Beast. Latest signings to the roster include Aldous Harding and British band Dry Cleaning.

In April 2021, the label released Bills & Aches & Blues, a compilation album featuring bands from 4AD covering songs the label had released over its 40 years.

== Distribution ==
While 4AD did not handle any distribution outside the United Kingdom for many years, it had many willing distributors in many countries; Virgin Records for France, Nippon Columbia distributed much of the label in Japan, while PolyGram subsidiary Vertigo Records released many of the label's records in Canada. The USA had always been a tough market for 4AD, even though its records sold well there as imports. Only a few of the label's acts had deals to license their recordings in the US, among various labels.

In 1992, Watts-Russell signed a five-year distribution deal with Warner Bros. Records so that nearly all 4AD releases would be released in the United States. When the deal ended, he offered to sell the label back to Beggars Banquet. Dead Can Dance's output, however, stayed with Warner Bros. until the sale back to Beggars Group.

The deal with Beggars Banquet was completed by early 1999, and since then it has owned 4AD and its distribution worldwide. This led to many negotiations for the label's back catalogue, like getting back American distribution rights for Pixies, Dead Can Dance and Cocteau Twins.

== Artists ==
=== Current ===
- Adrianne Lenker
- Aldous Harding
- Anjimile
- @ (band)
- Atlas Sound
- Bartees Strange
- Big Thief
- The Breeders
- Buck Meek
- Daughter
- Deerhunter
- Dry Cleaning
- Ex:Re
- Future Islands
- Jenny Hval
- Julia Jacklin
- Kim Deal
- Maria Somerville
- The National
- Tucker Zimmerman
- Tune-Yards
- U.S. Girls
- YHWH Nailgun

=== Former ===
- Air Miami (disbanded)
- The Amps (disbanded)
- Anni Rossi (active)
- A.R. Kane (disbanded)
- Ariel Pink (active)
- Tom Baril (photographer published by 4AD)
- Bauhaus (reformed)
- Bearz (still active as a David Gunstone project c. 2019)
- Becky and the Birds
- Beirut (active)
- Belly (active 2018)
- Heidi Berry (inactive; currently a teacher)
- Bettie Serveert (active)
- The Big Pink (active)
- Bing & Ruth (active)
- The Birthday Party (disbanded)
- Frank Black (active)
- Blonde Redhead (active)
- Bon Iver (active)
- Broken Records (active)
- Michael Brook (active)
- The Bulgarian State Television Female Vocal Choir (active)
- Camera Obscura (active)
- Erika de Casier (active)
- Celebration (active)
- Lucinda Chua (active)
- Clan of Xymox (active)
- Gene Clark (deceased)
- Cocteau Twins (disbanded)
- Colourbox (dissolved)
- Cuba (a.k.a. Air Cuba) (disbanded)
- cumgirl8 (active)
- Cupol (one-off collaboration)
- C.V.O. (disbanded)
- D.D Dumbo (active)
- Dance Chapter (disbanded)
- Dead Can Dance (active)
- Department of Eagles (active)
- Diana Gordon (active)
- Dif Juz (disbanded)
- Tanya Donelly (active)
- Efterklang
- EL VY
- Electricity in Our Homes (active)
- The Fast Set (disbanded)
- Frazier Chorus (dissolved)
- Future Islands (active)
- Future of the Left (active)
- Lisa Germano (active)
- Lisa Gerrard (active)
- Lisa Gerrard & Pieter Bourke
- B. C. Gilbert & G. Lewis
- The Glee Club (disbanded)
- Rachel Goswell
- Gang Gang Dance (active)
- The Golden Dregs (active)
- Gianna Kondor (active)
- Grimes (active)
- GusGus (active)
- Rene Halkett & David J
- Neil Halstead (active)
- The Happy Family (disbanded)
- HAWA (active)
- Tim Hecker (active)
- Holly Herndon
- Kristin Hersh (active)
- His Name Is Alive (active)
- The Hope Blister (disbanded)
- Rowland S. Howard (deceased) & Lydia Lunch
- In Camera (disbanded)
- Inc. (active)
- Indians (active)
- Insides (active)
- Iron & Wine (active)
- It Hugs Back (active)
- Jóhann Jóhannsson (deceased)
- Matt Johnson (The The founder; released a solo album in 1981 that was reissued in 1993 through 4AD as a The The album)
- Joker (active)
- Søren Juul (active)
- Lakuna (one-off project)
- Mark Lanegan Band
- Last Dance (disbanded)
- The Late Cord (one-off collaboration)
- The Lemon Twigs (active)
- Liima (active)
- Liquorice (one-off collaboration)
- Lo-Fang (active)
- LNZNDRF (one-off collaboration)
- Lydia Lunch (active)
- Lush (disbanded; reformed 2015–2016)
- MARRS (disbanded)
- Tkay Maidza (active)
- Magnetophone (active)
- Mass (disbanded)
- Cass McCombs (active)
- Merchandise (active)
- Methyl Ethel (active)
- Vinny Miller (active)
- Minotaur Shock (active)
- Modern English (active)
- Mojave 3 (disbanded)
- John Moreland (active)
- The Mountain Goats (active)
- My Captains (disbanded)
- Helado Negro
- Velvet Negroni (active)
- Colin Newman (active)
- Pieter Nooten & Michael Brook
- The Paladins (on hiatus)
- Pale Saints (disbanded)
- The Past 7 Days (disbanded)
- Brendan Perry (active)
- Piano Magic (disbanded)
- Pixies (active)
- Pixx (active)
- Emma Pollock (active)
- Psychotik Tanks (disbanded)
- Purity Ring (active)
- Ra Ra Riot (one-off split single with Stornoway)
- Red Atkins (deceased)
- Red House Painters (disbanded)
- Rema-Rema (disbanded)
- Richenel (deceased)
- Scheer (disbanded)
- Scott Walker (deceased)
- Serena-Maneesh (active)
- Shox (disbanded)
- Kendra Smith (active c.2017–2018)
- SOHN (active)
- Sort Sol (active)
- SpaceGhostPurrp (active)
- Spasmodic Caress (disbanded)
- Spencer.
- Spirea X (disbanded)
- Spoonfed Hybrid (disbanded)
- Starry Smooth Hound (the original alias of Vinny Miller)
- Stereolab (active)
- Stornoway (disbanded)
- St. Vincent (active)
- Swallow (disbanded)
- Sybarite (active)
- Tarnation (disbanded; currently Paula Frazer and Tarnation)
- that dog. (active)
- The The (active)
- Thievery Corporation (active)
- This Mortal Coil (concluded)
- Throwing Muses (active)
- Tindersticks (active)
- Torres (active)
- Tones on Tail (disbanded)
- TV on the Radio (active)
- Twin Shadow (active)
- 23 Envelope (4AD's design regulars in the 1980s and 1990s; became v23)
- Ultra Vivid Scene (disbanded)
- Underground Lovers (active)
- Unrest (disbanded)
- Vaughan Oliver & v23 (deceased)
- M Ward (active)
- Wolf & Cub (active)
- The Wolfgang Press (active)
- Xmal Deutschland (disbanded)
- Zomby (active)

== Catalogue numbering scheme ==
In 2013, the music historian Martin Aston wrote in Facing the Other Way: The Story of 4AD:

The attention to cataloguing aided the collectability of 4AD (the prefixes extended to DAD, GAD and HAD). It was all part of the bespoke detail that set independent labels apart from the majors. It created an identifiable culture that had grown big enough to support its own distribution system and trade magazine.

For the most part, 4AD's official UK releases follow a standard scheme for designating catalogue numbers. Although there have been some variations over the years, some general rules can be devised to easily determine the format (LP, CD, etc.) and year of release by looking at a 4AD catalog number.

=== Prefix ===
The first part of a catalogue number is a prefix that contains a variation of "AD," based on the 4AD name. Some standards are:

- AD = single
- BAD = EP
- CAD = full-length LP
- DAD = double LP
- MAD = mini-LP

Special editions of releases had an extra "D" added to the prefix:

- CAD D = special edition of a full-length LP
- DAD D = special edition of a double LP

Some other "AD" variations have been used less frequently over the years, including (but not limited to):

- EAD = electronic download
- GAD = reissue (usually mid-priced)
- HAD = remastered or significantly altered reissue (usually with some combination of bonus tracks, re-mastering, or new artwork)
- JAD and MAD = "mini album" that is longer than an EP but shorter than an LP
- SAD = Super Audio CD release (as in the Dead Can Dance 2008 remastered reissues)
- TAD = temporary/limited release

4AD only released one LP on DAT format, Cocteau Twins' Blue Bell Knoll, which was designated CADT 807.

=== Numerical designation ===
The second part of the catalogue number is a number that represents the year of release (via the number of years since 1980, following the '1980 Forward' theme), and the order of release in the particular year. For example, This Mortal Coil's LP It'll End in Tears is CAD 411. The "CAD" represents that the release is an LP, the "4" in 411 represents 1984, and 11 marks the 11th release of that year. This is the vinyl LP release; cassette versions have "C" added to the prefix (CADC 411 in this example); CD versions have "CD" added at the end (CAD 411CD).

A side effect of this scheme is that it made it seem like 4AD had hundreds of releases early on. In the 1990s, 4AD changed the first part of the number from "100s" to "1000s," temporarily making the number not correspond with the number of years since 1980. Releases in 1990 used "00" directly after the prefix (e.g., the Pixies' Bossanova, CAD0010, released in the fall of 1990); 1991 used "10" directly after the prefix (e.g., This Mortal Coil's Blood, DAD 1005, released early in 1991), 1992 used "20," and so on for the rest of the 1990s.

Wanting to return to numbering with the years since 1980, 4AD had to provide a workaround for releases in the year 2000. Since the "20" numerical designation had been used in 1992, all releases in 2000 used "2K" (e.g., Mojave 3's Excuses for Travellers, CAD 2K05, released in early 2000). Between 2001 and 2009, the catalogue numbering scheme returned to the original format, with the first two digits of the number representing the years since 1980 (e.g., Blonde Redhead's 23, CAD 2717, released in 2007; the 27th year since 1980). Things have not been too consistent since, and there have been several gaps. 2010 releases feature the numerical designation 3X, as "30" had already been used in 1993. This process appears to have come to an end with the few xAD37nn releases of the early months of 2017. The catalogue numbers of all releases since April 2017 (beginning with The Far Field by Future Islands, 4AD0001CD/4AD0001LP) have begun with 4AD0nnn and ended with letters indicating the release format. No indication of release year is given.

== 4AD Sessions ==
The 4AD Sessions are an ongoing series of video recordings with various acts from the label's roster. Following on from the Deerhunter session at the Studio Plateaux on Platts Eyott island in 2008, the recordings see 4AD artists performing back-catalogue covers and alternative versions of their own material. They are housed on the label's website.
