= Keep Shelly in Athens =

Greek band

- Origin: Kypseli, Athens, Greece
- Genres: Chillwave; downtempo; dream pop
- Years active: 2010–present
- Labels: Cascine; Forest Family; Sixteen Tambourines; Planet Mu; Transparent; Friends of Friends
- Members: RΠЯ; Guest singers
- Past members: Jessica Bell (author); Sarah P. Myrtha
- Website: keepshellyinathens.com

Keep Shelly in Athens are a Greek chillwave duo from Athens. They formed in 2010, and were quickly signed to the vinyl imprint label of independent music blog Gorilla vs. Bear, Forest Family Records. In November of that year, they released their debut 12" EP, In Love with Dusk, which quickly sold out due to much internet hype. They are currently signed to Cascine Records, who released their debut full-length album in 2013.

== History ==
The group was formed sometime in 2010 when a producer known only as RΠЯ started seeking out someone with whom to perform newly written songs. Through a mutual friend, Sarah P. was introduced to RΠЯ, and they soon began to perform together. The band name was conceived as a pun on Kypseli, a neighbourhood of Athens. The band have now toured North America and Europe as a four piece, and in 2012 played as a feature artist at the Coachella Valley Music and Arts Festival. On 17 January 2014, Sarah P. announced she was no longer in Keep Shelly in Athens. In March 2014 the band announced a new singer, Myrtha. In 2017, the band released a new LP, Philokalia, fronted by another new singer, Jessica Bell. In 2021 Keep Shelly in Athens announced a new collaborative singles series with guest vocalists from around the world.

== Style ==
The band's musical style is influenced by Saint Etienne and Air, whereas Sarah P.'s vocal style is influenced by Tracey Thorn and Nancy Sinatra.

== Discography ==
=== Mini-albums, EPs and singles ===
- In Love with Dusk 12" (Forest Family Records, 2010)
1. Running Out of You
2. Cremona Memories
3. Fokionos Negri Street
4. Rainy Night
5. Don't Be Afraid
6. In Love with Dusk
7. Body Language – You Can (Keep Shelly in Athens Remix)
- Campus Martius 12" (Planet Mu, 2011)
1. Solar Bears – Cub (Keep Shelly in Athens Remix)
2. The Chains
3. Campus Martius
4. Struggle With Yourself
- Our Own Dream 12" (Forest Family Records, 2011)
1. Lazy Noon
2. Our Own Dream
3. ABADABAD – California Birds (Keep Shelly in Athens Remix)
4. DIY
5. Fairytale
6. A) The Rogue Superhero B) Ready To Pay The Price
- Keep Shelly in Athens CS (Sixteen Tambourines Records, 2011)
1. Running Out Of You
2. Cremona Memories
3. A Tear In My I
4. Yellow Man
5. Hauntin' Me
6. Fokionos Negri Street
7. Don't Be Afraid
8. Running Out Of You (Memory Tapes Remix)
- Late Night Later Night CS (split with Disclosure) (Loud and Quiet Cassettes, 2011)
1. Running Out of You
2. Hauntin' Me
3. Yellow Man
4. Disclosure – Carnival
5. Disclosure – I Love That You Know
6. Disclosure – Blue You
- Hauntin' Me 7" (Transparent, 2011)
1. Hauntin' Me
2. Song To Cheer You Up
- Fractals (Friends of Friends, 2015)
1. Fractals
2. Fractals (Tomas Barfod Remix)
- Introvert EP (Keep Shelly in Athens, 2018)
1. Introvert 2:18
2. Livin' 4:23
3. Celebrity 3:40
4. Don't Need 'Em 5:22
5. No Looking Back 5:04
6. Epilogue 2:11
- Bendable / Glistening 7" (Cascine, 2018)
1. Bendable 3:28
2. Glistening 4:17
- (Don't Fear) The Reaper Single (Keep Shelly in Athens, 2019)
1. (Don't Fear) The Reaper 3'23
- Sunny Day EP (Keep Shelly in Athens, 2019)
1. Fight 3:06
2. Sunny Day 3:17
3. Giving 2:43
4. California Tears 3:53
5. I Don't Need You (feat. Ocean Hope) 4:12
- 9 Years EP (Keep Shelly in Athens, 2019)
1. Human Stars 3:58
2. Cyclades 4:44
3. Frantic 3:45
4. Late Summer 3:30
5. 9 Years 4:28
- Steady To Go EP (Keep Shelly in Athens, 2020)
1. You've Got a Kitty On a Timer 4'02
2. Horizon's Glow 4'12
3. Steady To Go 4'27
4. I Won't Cry 3'35
5. Highs And Lows 5'09
- Back to Reality – Single (Keep Shelly in Athens, 2020)
1. Back to Reality (feat. Vauxhall Underground) 4'28
2. Just Like In The Movies (feat. Vauxhall Underground) 2'34
3. Just Like In The Movies (Instrumental) 2'34
- Early – Single (Keep Shelly in Athens, 2021)
1. Early (Instrumental) 2'44
- You – Single (Keep Shelly in Athens, 2021)
1. You (feat. Georgia Hurd) 4'32
- Nea Kypseli / Antetokounmpo – Single (Keep Shelly in Athens, 2021)
1. Nea Kypseli 3'14
2. Antetokounmpo 2'42
- Nothing Like Them – Single (Keep Shelly in Athens, 2021)
1. Nothing Like Them 4'01
- Upside Down – Single (Keep Shelly in Athens, 2022)
1. Upside Down 3'15
- Sick – Single (Keep Shelly in Athens, 2022)
1. Sick 3'40
- Among Wolves – Single (Keep Shelly in Athens, 2022)
1. Among Wolves 2'58
2. Mostly International 3'30

=== Albums ===
- In Love With Dusk / Our Own Dream (2012) (LP on Forest Family Records, CD on Plancha/Art Union)
- At Home (2013) (LP on Cascine, CD on Plancha/Art Union)
- Now I'm Ready (2015) (Friends Of Friends)
- Philokalia (2017) (Athenian Aura Recordings)
- Among Wolves (2023) (Athenian Aura Recordings)

=== Remixes ===
- Porcelain Raft – Tip of Your Tongue (Keep Shelly in Athens Remix) (from Tip of Your Tongue Remixes) (Acéphale, 2010)
- Tropics – Mouves (Keep Shelly in Athens Remix) (from Mouves) (Planet Mu, 2010)
- Body Language – You Can (Keep Shelly in Athens Remix) (from Social Studies) (Body Language Self-Released, 2011)
- Crazy P – Wecanonlybewhoweare (Keep Shelley in Athens Mix) (from Wecanonlybewhoweare (Keep Shelley in Athens Mix)) (Crazy P Self-Released, 2011)
- Tycho – Dive (Keep Shelly in Athens Remix) (from Dive) (Ghostly International, 2012)

=== Special appearances ===
- MMOTHS – Heart (from EP) (Street Quality Entertainment, 2012)
- The New Division – Night Escape (from Night Escape EP) (Division 87, 2012)
- Plastic Flowers – Ghosts (from "Evergreen") (Inner Ear Records/Crash Symbols, 2014)

=== Compilation appearances ===
- Running Out Of You (DannielRadall Remix) appears on Beko_Amdiscs1 (BEKODSL & AMDISCS, 2010)
- Song To Cheer You Up appears on DYVNZMBR (DZ TAPES, 2011)
- Running Out Of You (Memory Tapes Remix) appears on Memory Tapes – Player Piano (Something In Construction, 2011)
- Hauntin' Me appears on Weekly Magic Tape No. 9 (Magic, 2011)
- Our Own Dream appears on Weekly Magic Tape No. 37 (Magic, 2011)
- In Love With Dusk appears on Keep It Yours Records Compilation Vol.1 (Keep It Yours Records, 2011)
- Just Like Honey appears on Just Like Honey (Just Like Honey, 2011)
- DIY (Sasha Involv3r Remix) appears on Sasha Involv3r (Ministry of Sound, 2013)
